= 2023 Virginia Cavaliers football team =

American college football season

2023 Virginia Cavaliers football
- Conference: Atlantic Coast Conference
- Record: 3–9 (2–6 ACC)
- Head coach: Tony Elliott (2nd season)
- Offensive coordinator: Desmond Kitchings (2nd season)
- Offensive scheme: Multiple pro-style
- Defensive coordinator: John Rudzinski (2nd season)
- Base defense: Multiple 4–2–5
- Home stadium: Scott Stadium

2023 Atlantic Coast Conference football standings
	Conf.			Overall
Team	W		L	W		L
No. 6 Florida State y$	8	–	0	13	–	1
No. 19 Louisville y	7	–	1	10	–	4
No. 21 NC State	6	–	2	9	–	4
Georgia Tech	5	–	3	7	–	6
Virginia Tech	5	–	3	7	–	6
No. 20 Clemson	4	–	4	9	–	4
Duke	4	–	4	8	–	5
North Carolina	4	–	4	8	–	5
Boston College	3	–	5	7	–	6
Miami (FL)	3	–	5	7	–	6
Syracuse	2	–	6	6	–	7
Pittsburgh	2	–	6	3	–	9
Virginia	2	–	6	3	–	9
Wake Forest	1	–	7	4	–	8
Championship: Florida State 16, Louisville 6
$ – Conference champion; y – Championship game participant; Rankings from AP Poll

The 2023 Virginia Cavaliers football team represented the University of Virginia as a member of the Atlantic Coast Conference (ACC) during the 2023 NCAA Division I FBS football season. The Cavaliers were led by second-year head coach Tony Elliott and played home games at Scott Stadium in Charlottesville, Virginia. The Virginia Cavaliers football team drew an average home attendance of 43,293 in 2023.

== Schedule ==
Virginia and the ACC announced the 2023 football schedule on January 30, 2023. The 2023 season was the conference's first season since 2004, other than 2020, with a scheduling format not split into two divisions. The new format sets Virginia with three set conference opponents, while playing the remaining ten teams twice (home and away) in a four-year cycle. The Cavaliers' three set conference opponents for the next four years are Louisville, North Carolina, and Virginia Tech.

Date	Time	Opponent	Site	TV	Result	Attendance
September 2	12:00 p.m.	vs. No. 12 Tennessee*	Nissan Stadium; Nashville, TN (SEC Nation)	ABC	L 13–49	69,507
September 9	12:00 p.m.	James Madison*	Scott Stadium; Charlottesville, VA	ESPNU	L 35–36	56,508
September 15	7:00 p.m.	at Maryland*	SECU Stadium; College Park, MD (rivalry)	FS1	L 14–42	37,041
September 22	7:30 p.m.	NC State	Scott Stadium; Charlottesville, VA	ESPN	L 21–24	42,979
September 30	2:00 p.m.	at Boston College	Alumni Stadium; Chestnut Hill, MA	The CW	L 24–27	41,868
October 7	12:00 p.m.	No. 10 (FCS) William & Mary*^{†}	Scott Stadium; Charlottesville, VA	ACCN	W 27–13	38,289
October 21	6:30 p.m.	at No. 10 North Carolina	Kenan Memorial Stadium; Chapel Hill, NC (South's Oldest Rivalry)	The CW	W 31–27	50,500
October 28	3:30 p.m.	at Miami (FL)	Hard Rock Stadium; Miami Gardens, FL	ACCN	L 26–29 ^{OT}	58,503
November 4	2:00 p.m.	Georgia Tech	Scott Stadium; Charlottesville, VA	The CW	L 17–45	42,606
November 9	7:30 p.m.	at No. 11 Louisville	L&N Stadium; Louisville, KY	ESPN	L 24–31	44,628
November 18	3:00 p.m.	Duke	Scott Stadium; Charlottesville, VA	The CW	W 30–27	36,400
November 25	3:30 p.m.	Virginia Tech	Scott Stadium; Charlottesville, VA (Commonwealth Cup)	ACCN	L 17–55	42,976
*Non-conference game; ^{†}Homecoming; Rankings from AP Poll (and CFP Rankings, after November 1) - Released prior to game; All times are in Eastern time

== Roster ==
2023 Virginia Cavaliers football team roster
Players
Coaches
Offense

Pos.	#	Name	Class
RB	0	Cody Brown	So
WR	1	Suderian Harrison	Fr
RB	2	Perris Jones	Sr
WR	3	Delaney Crawford	Fr
WR	4	Malik Washington	GS
RB	5	Kobe Pace	Sr
RB	7	Mike Hollins	GS
WR	8	Malachi Fields	So
RB	9	Amaad Foston	So
QB	10	Anthony Colandrea	Fr
QB	11	Tony Muskett	Sr
QB	13	Jared Rayman	Sr
WR	17	JR Wilson	So
WR	18	Jaden Gibson	Fr
QB	19	Grady Brosterhous	Fr
RB	20	Xavier Brown	So
WR	21	Landon Spell	Fr
QB	22	Devin Sherwood	Fr
RB	25	Donté Hawthorne	Fr
WR	26	Ethan Davies	So
WR	27	KJ Bratton	Fr
RB	28	Noah Vaughn	Fr
RB	34	Kevin Chadwick Jr.	Fr
RB	34	Jack Griese	Fr
TE	44	Sackett Wood Jr.	Sr
OT	50	Jimmy Christ	GS
C	51	Ty Furnish	So
OT	52	McKale Boley	So
C	53	Dawson Alters	Fr
OT	54	Blake Steen	Fr
C	55	Brian Stevens	GS
OT	57	Andy Lutes	Fr
G	58	Noah Hartsoe	Fr
OT	60	Charlie Patterson	So
G	61	Dane Steele	Fr
G	63	Joey Kagel	So
G	64	Cole Surber	Fr
OT	68	Jack Witmer	So
G	69	Luke Johnson	Jr
G	70	Grant Lanham	So
G	71	Ugonna Nnanna	Sr
G	72	Snoop Leota-Amaama	Fr
G	74	Noah DeMeritt	Fr
OT	75	Houston Curry	Fr
G	77	Noah Josey	So
G	78	Jestus Johnson III	Jr
OL	79	Jessie Knight	Sr
WR	80	TyLyric Coleman	Fr
TE	81	TeKai Kirby	Fr
WR	82	Eli Wood	Fr
WR	83	Dakota Twitty	Fr
WR	84	Dillon Tennyson	So
TE	85	Grant Misch	Sr
WR	86	Claiborne Richards	Fr
WR	87	Titus Ivy	Fr
TE	88	Karson Gay	Fr
TE	89	Joshua Rawlings	Jr
TE	93	Henry Duke	So
TE	94	Hayden Rollison	Fr

Defense

Pos.	#	Name	Class
S	0	Antonio Clary	Sr
DE	1	Paul Akere	GS
LB	2	Stevie Bracey	So
LB	3	Langston Long	Jr
CB	4	Dave Herard	Jr
LB	5	Kam Robinson	Fr
CB	6	Dre Walker	Fr
LB	7	James Jackson	Jr
CB	8	Malcolm Greene	GS
DB	9	Coen King	Sr
DE	10	Ben Smiley III	Sr
CB	11	William Simpkins III	So
CB	13	Sam Westfall	GS
DE	14	Miles Greene	Fr
DE	15	Chico Bennett Jr.	GS
LB	16	Trey McDonald	Fr
S	17	Aidan Ryan	So
DT	18	Michael Diatta	So
DT	19	Olasunkonmi Agunloye	Jr
S	20	Jonas Sanker	Jr
S	21	Donovan Johnson Sr.	Jr
CB	22	Elijah Gaines	Jr
CB	23	Tayvonn Kyle	Sr
DT	25	Terrell Jones	Fr
S	26	Caleb Hardy	Fr
CB	27	Trent Baker-Booker	Fr
LB	28	Sam Brady	Jr
S	29	Davis Lane Jr.	Fr
S	30	Addie Burrow	Sr
CB	31	Micah Gaffney	So
S	32	Landon Danley	Fr
LB	33	Josh Ahern	Sr
S	36	Carlo Thompson	Fr
S	37	John Hurley	Fr
DE	38	Mekhi Buchanan	Fr
S	39	Robbie Engelberg	Fr
LB	40	Rob Keys	Fr
LB	42	Kendall Cross	So
LB	43	Logan Kotter	Fr
DE	44	Brayden Sheffer	Jr
S	46	Devin Clark	Fr
DE	47	Gabe Sneed	Fr
LB	49	Josh McCarron	So
DE	52	Nate Morris	Jr
LB	53	Justin Stewart	Fr
DE	54	Joseph Holland III	So
DT	55	Anthony Britton	Fr
DE	56	Caleb Stoltz	Sr
DT	59	Jack Hardy	Jr
DE	82	Kam Butler	GS
DE	88	Lorenz Terry	So
DT	89	Sam Bond	So
DT	90	Jahmeer Carter	Sr
DT	91	Jason Hammond	Fr
DT	92	Andrew Williams	So
DE	93	Jonathan Horton	Jr
DT	94	Aaron Faumui	Sr
DT	95	Nana Appouh	Fr
DT	96	Bryce Carter	So
DT	98	Bryce Purnell	Fr
DE	99	DJ Jones	Fr

Special teams

Pos.	#	Name	Class
LS	32	Luke Byrne	So
P	38	Daniel Sparks	Sr
K	41	Will Bettridge	So
LS	45	Aidan Livingston	GS
K	47	Vadin Bruot	Fr
K	98	Matt Ganyard	Sr
P/PK	99	Elijah Slibeck	Fr

Head coach

- Tony Elliott

Coordinators/assistant coaches

- Des Kitchings – Offensive coordinator/ Tight ends
- John Rudzinski – Defensive coordinator/ Defensive backs
- Keith Gaither – Special teams coordinator/ Running backs
- Curome Cox – Defensive passing game coordinator/ Defensive backs
- Dave Patenaude – Senior offensive analyst
- Chris Slade – Defensive ends

Legend

- (C) Team captain
- (S) Suspended
- (I) Ineligible
- Injured
- Redshirt

Roster

== Game summaries ==
=== vs Tennessee ===
Game One – Virginia Cavaliers (0-0) vs No. 12 Tennessee Volunteers (0-0) – Game summary

Quarter	1	2	3	4	Total
Virginia	0	3	7	3	13
No. 12 Tennessee	7	14	14	14	49

at Nissan Stadium • Nashville, Tennessee

- Date: Saturday, September 2, 2023
- Game time: 12:00 p.m. EST
- Game weather: Sunny, 80 °F (27 °C)
- Game attendance: 69,507
- Referee: Matt Loeffler
- TV announcers (ABC): Joe Tessitore (play-by-play), Jesse Palmer (analyst), Katie George (sideline)

Game information

First quarter

- (12:05) TENN – Dylan Sampson 9-yard pass from Joe Milton III (Charles Campbell kick) (Drive: 8 plays, 62 yards, 2:55; Tennessee 7-0)

Second quarter

- (4:41) TENN – Dylan Sampson 3-yard run (Charles Campbell kick) (Drive: 13 plays, 90 yards, 4:52; Tennessee 14-0)
- (1:42) UVA – Will Bettridge 30-yard field goal (Drive: 6 plays, 52 yards, 2:59; Tennessee 14-3)
- (0:06) TENN – Joe Milton III 1-yard run (Charles Campbell kick) (Drive: 9 plays, 75 yards, 1:36; Tennessee 21-3)

Third quarter

- (10:52) TENN – Joe Milton III 1-yard run (Charles Campbell kick) (Drive: 10 plays, 77 yards, 3:10; Tennessee 28-3)
- (7:23) TENN – Dylan Sampson 2-yard run (Charles Campbell kick) (Drive: 6 plays, 30 yards, 2:28; Tennessee 35-3)
- (3:05) UVA – Perris Jones 17-yard run (Will Bettridge kick) (Drive: 8 plays, 75 yards, 4:18; Tennessee 35-10)

Fourth quarter

- (13:36) TENN – Jacob Warren 11-yard pass from Joe Milton III (Charles Campbell kick) (Drive: 6 plays, 27 yards, 2:03; Tennessee 42-10)
- (11:06) TENN – Dylan Sampson 3-yard run (Charles Campbell kick) (Drive: 7 plays, 40 yards, 1:40; Tennessee 49-10)
- (0:39) UVA – Will Bettridge 40-yard field goal (Drive: 10 plays, 47 yards, 3:57; Tennessee 49-13)

Statistics	UVA	TENN
First downs	12	29
Total yards	64–201	85–499
Rushing yards	40–95	52–287
Passing yards	106	212
Passing: Comp–Att–Int	11–24–0	23–33–0
Time of possession	32:54	27:06

Team	Category	Player	Statistics
Virginia	Passing	Tony Muskett	9/17, 94 yards
Virginia	Rushing	Perris Jones	7 carries, 39 yards, TD
Virginia	Receiving	Malachi Fields	4 receptions, 63 yards
Tennessee	Passing	Joe Milton III	21/30, 201 yards, 2 TD
Tennessee	Rushing	Jaylen Wright	12 carries, 115 yards
Tennessee	Receiving	Ramel Keyton	3 receptions, 66 yards

=== at Maryland ===
Game Three – Virginia Cavaliers (0–2) at Maryland Terrapins (2–0) – Game summary

Quarter	1	2	3	4	Total
Cavaliers	14	0	0	0	14
Terrapins	7	7	7	21	42

at SECU Stadium • College Park, Maryland

- Date: September 15th
- Game time: 3:30 p.m. EDT/12:30 p.m. PDT
- Game attendance: 37,041
- Referee: Mike Roche
- TV announcers (FS1): Eric Collins (play-by-play) and Devin Gardner (analyst)

Game information

First quarter

- 12:25 UVA - Perris Jones 13-yard run (Will Bettridge kick) - 7-0 Virginia, Drive: 3 plays, 65 yards, 1:20
- 4:16 UVA - Kobe Pace 19-yard pass from Anthony Colandrea (Will Bettridge kick) - 14-0 Virginia, Drive: 7 plays, 63 yards, 3:59
- 4:03 MD - Braeden Wisloski 98-yard kickoff return (Jack Howes kick) - 14-7 Virginia, Drive: 0 plays, 0 yards, 0:00

Second quarter

- 1:23 MD - Roman Hemby 3-yard run (Jack Howes kick) - 14-14, Drive: 14 plays, 97 yards, 6:23

Third quarter

- 9:47 MD - Jeshaun Jones 64-yard pass from Taulia Tagovailoa (Jack Howes kick) - 21-14 Maryland, Drive: 6 plays, 85 yards, 2:39

Fourth quarter

- 11:10 MD - Roman Hemby 3-yard run (Jack Howes kick) - 28-14 Maryland, Drive: 9 plays, 80 yards, 3:34
- 10:25 MD - Antwain Littleton II 2-yard run (Jack Howes kick) - 35-14 Maryland, Drive: 3 plays, 30 yards, 0:37
- 5:58 MD - Colby McDonald 1-yard run (Jack Howes kick) - 42-14 Maryland, Drive: 6 plays, 56 yards, 3:18

Statistics	Virginia	Maryland
First downs	25	20
Plays–yards	69-354	61-461
Rushes–yards	30-91	31-119
Passing yards	263	342
Passing: comp–att–int	23-39-3	19-30-0
Turnovers		
Time of possession	31:27	28:33

Team	Category	Player	Statistics
Virginia	Passing	Anthony Colandrea	23/39, 263 yards, 1 TD, 3 INT
Virginia	Rushing	Perris Jones	9 carries, 37 yards, 1 TD
Virginia	Receiving	Malik Washington	9 receptions, 141 yards
Maryland	Passing	Taulia Tagovailoa	19/30, 342 yards, 1 TD
Maryland	Rushing	Colby McDonald	10 carries, 75 yards, 1 TD
Maryland	Receiving	Jeshaun Jones	5 receptions, 96 yards, 1 TD

=== NC State ===
Game Four – NC State Wolfpacks (1–1) at Virginia Cavaliers (0–3) – Game summary

Quarter	1	2	3	4	Total
Wolfpack	0	14	7	3	24
Cavaliers	0	7	6	8	21

at Scott Stadium, Charlottesville, VA

- Date: September 22, 2023
- Game time: 7:30 p.m. EDT/4:30 p.m. PDT
- Game weather: Sunny
- Game attendance: 42,979
- Referee: Riley Johnson
- TV announcers (ESPN): Anish Shroff (play-by-play), Andre Ware (analyst), Paul Carcaterra (sideline)

Game information

First quarter

No scoring plays

Second quarter

- 4:55 NCSU – KC Concepcion 12-yard pass from Brennan Armstrong (Brayden Narveson kick) – 7–0 NC State, Drive: 7 plays, 49 yards, 2:43
- 1:46 UVA – Malik Washington 8-yard pass from Anthony Colandrea (Will Bettridge kick) – 7–7 Tied, Drive: 8 plays, 75 yards, 3:09
- 0:28 NCSU – Delbert Mimms III 1-yard run (Brayden Narveson kick) – 14–7 NC State, Drive: 8 plays, 67 yards, 2:36

Third quarter

- 6:48 UVA – Will Bettridge 21-yard field goal – 14–10 NC State, Drive: 5 plays, 60 yards, 1:59
- 2:24 UVA – Will Betridge 36-yard field goal – 14–13 NC State, Drive: 5 plays, 38 yards, 2:58
- 0:11 NCSU – KC Concepcion 48-yard pass from Brennan Armstrong (Brayden Narveson kick) – 21–13 NC State, Drive: 5 plays, 74 yards, 2:13

Fourth quarter

- 0:36 UVA – Malik Washington 3-yard pass from Anthony Colandrea (Malachi Fields pass from Anthony Colandrea for 2-point conversion) – 21–21 Tied, Drive: 11 plays, 66 yards, 2:53
- 0:00 NCSU – Brayden Narveson 33-yard field goal – 24–21 NC State, Drive 5 plays, 33 yards, 0:36

Statistics	NCSU	UVA
First downs	21	20
Total yards	319	384
Rushing yards	139	113
Passing yards	180	271
Turnovers	1	2
Time of possession	27:26	32:34

Team	Category	Player	Statistics
NC State	Passing	Brennan Armstrong	15–30, 180 yards, 2 TD, 1 INT
NC State	Rushing	Brennan Armstrong	15 rushes, 64 yards
NC State	Receiving	KC Concepcion	6 receptions, 116 yards, 2 TD
Virginia	Passing	Anthony Colandrea	18–30, 271 yards, 2 TD, 2 INT
Virginia	Rushing	Anthony Colandrea	13 rushes, 43 yards
Virginia	Receiving	Malik Washington	10 receptions, 170 yards, 2 TD

=== at Miami (FL) ===
Game Eight – Virginia Cavaliers (2–5) at Miami Hurricanes (5–2)

Quarter	1	2	3	4	OT	Total
Cavaliers	7	3	10	3	3	26
Hurricanes	0	3	14	6	6	29

at Hard Rock Stadium • Miami Gardens, Florida

- Date: Saturday, October 28, 2023
- Game time: 12:30 p.m. EST
- Game weather: Clear • Temperature: 83 °F (28 °C)
- TV announcers (ACCN): Jorge Sedano (play-by-play), Orlando Franklin (analyst)

Game information

First quarter

- (8:32) UVA – Mike Hollins 1-yard run, Will Bettridge kick (Drive: 12 plays, 75 yards, 4:27; Virginia 7–0)

Second quarter

- (10:08) UVA – Will Bettridge 22-yard field goal (Drive: 5 plays, 70 yards, 1:22; Virginia 10–0)
- (4:03) MIA – Andres Borregales 47-yard field goal (Drive: 8 plays, 43 yards, 4:34; Virginia 10–3)

Third quarter

- (10:44) MIA – Ajay Allen 26-yard run, Andres Borregales kick (Drive: 7 plays, 84 yards, 3:20; Tied 10–10)
- (10:37) MIA – Kamren Kinchens 29-yard interception return, Andres Borregales kick (Miami 17–10)
- (3:58) UVA – Will Bettridge 23-yard field goal (Drive: 15 plays, 69 yards, 6:39; Miami 17–13)
- (0:10) UVA – Mack Hollins 10-yard run, Will Bettridge kick (Drive: 6 plays, 49 yards, 2:40; Virginia 20–17)

Fourth quarter

- (9:26) MIA – Andres Borregales 50-yard field goal (Drive: 5 plays, 27 yards, 1:57; Tied 20–20)
- (4:20) UVA – Will Bettridge 32-yard field goal (Drive: 12 plays, 60 yards, 5:06; Virginia 23–20)
- (1:23) MIA – Andres Borregales 48-yard field goal (Drive: 9 plays, 42 yards, 2:50; Tied 23–23)

Overtime

- (0:00) UVA – Will Bettridge 35-yard field goal (Drive: 4 plays, 7 yards, 0:00; Virginia 26–23)
- (0:00) MIA – Mark Fletcher Jr. 11-yard run (Drive: 3 plays, 25 yards, 0:00; Miami 29–26)

Statistics	UVA	MIA
First downs	24	16
Plays–yards	83–377	56–276
Rushes–yards	45–138	26–113
Passing yards	239	163
Passing: comp–att–int	24–38–1	20–30–2
Turnovers		
Time of possession	34:36	25:24

Team	Category	Player	Statistics
Virginia	Passing	Tony Muskett	24/38, 239 yards, INT
Virginia	Rushing	Perris Jones	9 carries, 58 yards
Virginia	Receiving	Malik Washington	12 receptions, 152 yards
Miami	Passing	Tyler Van Dyke	20/30, 163 yards, 2 INT
Miami	Rushing	Ajay Allen	11 carries, 67 yards, TD
Miami	Receiving	Xavier Restrepo	3 receptions, 48 yards

=== Virginia Tech ===
Game Twelve – Virginia Tech Hokies (5–6) at Virginia Cavaliers (3–8) – Game summary

Quarter	1	2	3	4	Total
Virginia Tech	10	14	24	7	55
Virginia	0	0	10	7	17

at Scott Stadium • Charlottesville, VA

- Date: November 25, 2023
- Game time: 3:30 p.m. EDT
- Game weather: sunny • Temperature: 43 °F (6 °C)
- Game attendance: 42,976
- Referee: Gary Patterson

Game information

First Quarter

- (9:58) VT – John Love 41 yd Field Goal (Drive: 11 plays, 52 yards, 5:02; VT 3–0)
- (3:21) VT - Stephen Gosnell 44 yd Pass From Kyron Drones (John Love Kick) (Drive: 6 plays, 64 yards, 2:24; VT 10-0)

Second Quarter

- (13:53) VT – Tucker Holloway 33 yd Rush (John Love Kick) (Drive: 5 plays, 79 yards, 2:32; VT 17–0)
- (5:30) VT - Bhayshul Tuten 32 yd Rush (John Love Kick) (Drive: 5 plays, 55 yards, 2:16; VT 24-0)

Third Quarter

- (11:12) VT - Da'Quan Felton 84 yd Pass From Kyron Drones (John Love Kick) (Drive: 1 play, 84 yards, 0:15; VT 31-0)
- (7:44) UVA - Will Bettridge 25 yd Field Goal (Drive: 9 plays, 68 yards, 3:28; VT 31-3)
- (7:28) VT - Bhayshul Tuten 94 yd Kickoff Return (John Love Kick) (VT 38-3)
- (6:07) UVA - Malachi Fields 38 yd Pass From Anthony Colandrea (Will Bettridge Kick) (Drive: 3 plays, 47 yards, 1:21; VT 38-10)
- (4:34) VT - John Love 47 yd Field Goal (Drive: 5 plays, 46 yards, 1:33; VT 41-10)
- (0:18) VT - Da'Quan Felton 34 yd Pass From Kyron Drones (John Love Kick) (Drive: 3 plays, 33 yards, 1:03; VT 48-10)

Fourth Quarter

- (9:18) UVA - Malachi Fields 3 yd Pass From Anthony Colandrea (Will Bettridge Kick) (Drive: 11 plays, 78 yards, 3:28; VT 48-17)
- (3:53) VT - Malachi Thomas 7 yd Rush (John Love Kick) (Drive: 8 plays, 43 yards, 5:25; VT 55-17)

Statistics	VT	UVA
First downs	16	18
Total yards	500	286
Rush yards	252	43
Passing yards	248	243
Turnovers	1	2
Time of possession	28:46	31:14

Team	Category	Player	Statistics
Virginia Tech	Passing	Kyron Drones	10/22, 244 yards, 3 TD
Virginia Tech	Rushing	Bhayshul Tuten	16 carries, 117 yards, TD
Virginia Tech	Receiving	Da'Quan Felton	3 receptions, 133 yards, 2 TD
Virginia	Passing	Anthony Colandrea	29/46, 243 yards, 2 TD
Virginia	Rushing	Donte Hawthorne	4 carries, 16 yards
Virginia	Receiving	Malik Washington	14 receptions, 115 yards

== Players drafted into the NFL ==
Round	Pick	Player	Position	NFL Club
6	184	Malik Washington	WR	Miami Dolphins
