= 2024 Virginia Cavaliers football team =

American college football season

2024 Virginia Cavaliers football
- Conference: Atlantic Coast Conference
- Record: 5–7 (3–5 ACC)
- Head coach: Tony Elliott (3rd season)
- Offensive coordinator: Desmond Kitchings (3rd season)
- Offensive scheme: Multiple pro-style
- Defensive coordinator: John Rudzinski (3rd season)
- Base defense: Multiple 4–2–5
- Home stadium: Scott Stadium

2024 Atlantic Coast Conference football standings
	Conf.			Overall
Team	W		L	W		L
No. 12 SMU y^	8	–	0	11	–	3
No. 14 Clemson y$^	7	–	1	10	–	4
No. 18 Miami (FL)	6	–	2	10	–	3
No. 20 Syracuse	5	–	3	10	–	3
Duke	5	–	3	9	–	4
Louisville	5	–	3	9	–	4
Georgia Tech	5	–	3	7	–	6
Boston College	4	–	4	7	–	6
Virginia Tech	4	–	4	6	–	7
Pittsburgh	3	–	5	7	–	6
NC State	3	–	5	6	–	7
North Carolina	3	–	5	6	–	7
Virginia	3	–	5	5	–	7
California	2	–	6	6	–	7
Wake Forest	2	–	6	4	–	8
Stanford	2	–	6	3	–	9
Florida State	1	–	7	2	–	10
Championship: Clemson 34, SMU 31
^ – College Football Playoff participant; $ – Conference champion; y – Championship game participant; Rankings from AP Poll

The 2024 Virginia Cavaliers football team represented the University of Virginia in the Atlantic Coast Conference (ACC) during the 2024 NCAA Division I FBS football season. The Cavaliers were led by Tony Elliott in his third year as head coach and played home games at Scott Stadium in Charlottesville, Virginia.

== Schedule ==
Date	Time	Opponent	Site	TV	Result	Attendance
August 31	6:00 p.m.	No. 13 (FCS) Richmond*	Scott Stadium; Charlottesville, VA	ACCNX/ESPN+	W 34–13	40,811
September 7	7:00 p.m.	at Wake Forest	Allegacy Federal Credit Union Stadium; Winston-Salem, NC	ESPN2	W 31–30	30,012
September 14	8:00 p.m.	Maryland*	Scott Stadium; Charlottesville, VA (rivalry)	ACCN	L 13–27	41,352
September 21	2:00 p.m.	at Coastal Carolina*	Brooks Stadium; Conway, SC	ESPN+	W 43–24	22,104
October 5	12:00 p.m.	Boston College^{†}	Scott Stadium; Charlottesville, VA	ACCN	W 24–14	38,285
October 12	3:30 p.m.	Louisville	Scott Stadium; Charlottesville, VA	ACCN	L 20–24	32,688
October 19	12:00 p.m.	at No. 10 Clemson	Memorial Stadium; Clemson, SC	ACCN	L 31–48	80,100
October 26	12:00 p.m.	North Carolina	Scott Stadium; Charlottesville, VA (South's Oldest Rivalry)	The CW	L 14–41	44,550
November 9	8:00 p.m.	at No. 18 Pittsburgh	Acrisure Stadium; Pittsburgh, PA	ACCN	W 24–19	56,693
November 16	3:30 p.m.	at No. 8 Notre Dame*	Notre Dame Stadium; Notre Dame, IN	NBC	L 14–35	77,622
November 23	12:00 p.m.	No. 13 SMU	Scott Stadium; Charlottesville, VA	ESPN2	L 7–33	36,305
November 30	8:00 p.m.	at Virginia Tech	Lane Stadium; Blacksburg, VA (Commonwealth Cup)	ACCN	L 17–37	65,632
*Non-conference game; ^{†}Homecoming; Rankings from AP Poll - Released prior to game; All times are in Eastern time

== Roster ==
2024 Virginia Cavaliers football team roster
Players
Coaches
Offense

Pos.	#	Name	Class
RB	0	Xavier Brown	Jr
TE	0	Sage Ennis	GS
WR	1	Suderian Harrison	So
WR	2	Andre Greene Jr.	Jr
RB	3	Donté Hawthorne	So
WR	4	Chris Tyree	GS
RB	5	Kobe Pace	GS
WR	6	JR Wilson	Jr
QB	7	Tony Muskett	GS
WR	8	Malachi Fields	Jr
WR	9	Jaden Gibson	So
QB	10	Anthony Colandrea	So
WR	11	Trell Harris	Jr
QB	13	Gavin Frakes	Jr
QB	14	Boone Lourd	Fr
WR	15	Titus Ivy	So
TE	16	Tyler Neville	GS
WR	17	TyLyric Coleman	So
QB	18	Alexander Brady	Fr
QB	19	Grady Brosterhous	So
RB	21	Landon Spell	So
WR	23	Triston Ward	Fr
RB	25	Davis Lane Jr.	So
WR	26	Ethan Davies	Jr
RB	27	Owen Gardner	GS
RB	28	Noah Vaughn	So
TE	30	Henry Omohundro	Fr
RB	34	Jack Griese	So
TE	44	Sackett Wood Jr.	GS
OL	50	Jimmy Christ	GS
OL	51	Ty Furnish	Jr
OL	52	McKale Boley	Jr
OL	53	Dawson Alters	So
OL	54	Blake Steen	So
OL	55	Brian Stevens	GS
OL	57	Andy Lutes	So
OL	58	Noah Hartsoe	So
OL	60	Charlie Patterson	Jr
OL	61	Dane Steele	So
OL	62	Drake Metcalf	GS
OL	63	Joey Kagel	Jr
OL	64	Cole Surber	So
OL	65	Grant Ellinger	Fr
OL	66	Alex Reisig	Fr
OL	68	Jack Witmer	Jr
OL	70	Dane Wleklinski	Fr
OL	71	Ugonna Nnanna	GS
OL	72	Ben York	Fr
OL	74	Ethan Sipe	GS
OL	75	Houston Curry	So
OL	76	Will Rosen	Fr
OL	77	Noah Josey	Jr
WR	80	Trevor Ladd	Fr
TE	81	TeKai Kirby	So
WR	82	Eli Wood	So
TE	83	Dakota Twitty	So
WR	84	Dillon Tennyson	Jr
WR	85	Kameron Courtney	Fr
WR	86	Claiborne Richards	So
TE	88	Karson Gay	So
TE	89	John Rogers	Fr
TE	93	Henry Duke	So
TE	94	Hayden Rollison	So

Defense

Pos.	#	Name	Class
S	0	Antonio Clary	GS
LB	2	Stevie Bracey	Jr
S	2	Caleb Hardy	So
S	3	Corey Thomas Jr.	GS
DB	4	Kendren Smith	GS
LB	5	Kam Robinson	So
CB	6	Dre Walker	So
LB	7	James Jackson	Sr
LB	8	Trey McDonald	So
CB	9	Jam Jackson	Jr
DE	10	Ben Smiley III	GS
DE	11	Mekhi Buchanan	So
LB	11	Dorian Jones	GS
LB	13	Myles Brown	Fr
DE	14	Miles Greene	So
DE	15	Chico Bennett Jr.	GS
DB	17	Aidan Ryan	Jr
DT	18	Michael Diatta	Jr
S	20	Jonas Sanker	Sr
S	21	Keke Adams	Fr
DB	22	Elijah Gaines	GS
CB	23	Kevon Gray	Fr
DT	25	Terrell Jones	So
CB	27	Trent Baker-Booker	So
S	28	Armstrong Jones	Fr
CB	29	Kempton Shine	GS
S	30	Ethan Minter	Fr
DB	31	Micah Gaffney	Jr
LB	32	Landon Danley	So
LB	33	Cayden Cook-Cash	Fr
DB	34	Kevin Chadwick Jr.	So
CB	37	John Hurley	So
S	39	Robbie Engelberg	So
LB	40	Rob Keys	So
LB	42	Kendall Cross	Jr
LB	43	Logan Kotter	So
DE	46	Chase Morrison	Fr
DE	47	Gabe Sneed	So
LB	49	Josh McCarron	Jr
DE	53	Justin Stewart	So
DE	54	Joseph Holland III	Jr
DT	55	Anthony Britton	So
DT	56	Tyler Simmons	Fr
DE	82	Kam Butler	GS
DE	85	Jewett Hayes	Fr
DE	88	Lorenz Terry	Jr
DT	90	Jahmeer Carter	GS
DT	91	Jason Hammond	So
DT	92	Andrew Williams	Jr
DE	93	Billy Koudelka	Fr
DT	95	Nana Appouh	So
DE	96	Bryce Carter	Jr
DT	98	Bryce Purnell	So
DT	99	DJ Jones	So

Special teams

Pos.	#	Name	Class
LS	32	Luke Byrne	Jr
K	36	Max Prozny	Fr
P	38	Daniel Sparks	GS
K	41	Will Bettridge	Jr
K	47	Vadin Bruot	So
LS	81	Payton Bunch	GS
P	99	Elijah Slibeck	So

Head coach

- Tony Elliott

Coordinators/assistant coaches

- Des Kitchings – Offensive coordinator/ Tight ends
- John Rudzinski – Defensive coordinator/ Defensive backs
- Keith Gaither – Special teams coordinator/ Running backs
- Kevin Downing – Associate head coach/ Defensive tackles
- Mike Adams – Linebackers
- Curome Cox – Defensive passing game coordinator/ Defensive backs
- Terry Heffernan – Offensive line & offensive run game coordinator
- Taylor Lamb – Quarterbacks
- Adam Mims – Wide receivers
- Chris Slade – Defensive ends
- Jonathan Celestin – Graduate assistant
- Mike Hollins – Graduate assistant
- Mike Moore – Graduate assistant
- Jared Rayman – Graduate assistant
- Coy DeWeese – Senior defensive analyst
- Antonio Fenelus – Defensive analyst

Legend

- (C) Team captain
- (S) Suspended
- (I) Ineligible
- Injured
- Redshirt

Roster
Last update: November 15, 2024

== Game summaries ==
=== No. 13 (FCS) Richmond ===
Game One – No. 13 (FCS) Richmond Spiders (0–0) vs Virginia Cavaliers (0–0) – Game summary

Quarter	1	2	3	4	Total
No. 13 (FCS) Spiders	0	7	3	3	13
Cavaliers	17	10	7	0	34

at Scott Stadium • Charlottesville, Virginia

- Date: Saturday August 31, 2024
- Game time: 6:00 PM
- Game weather: Cloudy • Temperature: 84 °F (29 °C) • Wind: N 7 mph
- Game attendance: 40,811
- TV announcers (ACCNX/ESPN+): Chris Carlin, Forrest Conoly

Game information

First quarter

- (11:35) UVA – Trell Harris 35-yard pass from Anthony Colandrea, Will Bettridge kick (Drive: 3 plays, 77 yards, 1:33; Virginia 7–0)
- (6:23) UVA – Will Bettridge 21-yard field goal (Drive: 8 plays, 50 yards, 3:22; Virginia 10–0)
- (2:41) UVA – Jack Griese 57-yard pass from Anthony Colandrea, Will Bettridge kick (Drive: 5 plays, 77 yards, 2:00; Virginia 17–0)

Second quarter

- (11:44) UVA – Will Bettridge 33-yard field goal (Drive: 9 plays, 59 yards, 4:52; Virginia 20–0)
- (4:48) RICH – Kyle Wickersham 5-yard run, Brandon Peskin kick (Drive: 13 plays, 75 yards, 6:56; Virginia 20–7)
- (3:16) UVA – Kobe Pace 3-yard run, Will Bettridge kick (Drive: 4 plays, 54 yards, 1:32; Virginia 27–7)

Third quarter

- (8:31) UVA – Anthony Colandrea 7-yard run, Will Bettridge kick (Drive: 12 plays, 75 yards, 6:29; Virginia 34–7)
- (0:00) RICH – Brandon Peskin 35-yard field goal (Drive: 5 plays, 11 yards, 2:33; Virginia 34–10)

Fourth quarter

- (4:46) RICH – Brandon Peskin 33-yard field goal (Drive: 10 plays, 53 yards, 5:26; Virginia 34–13)

Statistics	RICH	UVA
First downs	13	20
Total yards	257	497
Rushing yards	147	200
Passing yards	110	297
Passing: Comp–Att–Int	13–22–0	17–26–1
Time of possession	30:07	29:53

Team	Category	Player	Statistics
Richmond	Passing	Kyle Wickersham	13–22, 110 yards
Richmond	Rushing	Zach Palmer-Smith	7 carries, 76 yards
Richmond	Receiving	Nick DeGennaro	7 receptions, 74 yards
Virginia	Passing	Anthony Colandrea	17–23, 297 yards, 2 TD
Virginia	Rushing	Kobe Pace	11 carries, 93 yards, 1 TD
Virginia	Receiving	Malachi Fields	5 receptions, 100 yards

=== at Wake Forest ===
Game Two – Virginia Cavaliers (1–0) vs Wake Forest Demon Deacons (1–0) – Game summary

Quarter	1	2	3	4	Total
Cavaliers	3	14	0	14	31
Demon Deacons	10	10	10	0	30

at Allegacy Federal Credit Union Stadium • Winston-Salem, North Carolina

- Date: Saturday September 7, 2024
- Game time: 7:00 PM
- TV announcers (ESPN2): Mike Monaco, Kirk Morrison, and Dawn Davenport

Game information

First quarter

- (11:37) WF – Demond Claiborne 17-yard run, Matthew Dennis kick (Drive: 5 plays, 71 yards, 1:51; Wake Forest 7–0)
- (5:39) UVA – Will Bettridge 19-yard field goal (Drive: 6 plays, 68 yards, 3:06; Wake Forest 7–3)
- (2:27) WF – Matthew Dennis 21-yard field goal (Drive: 9 plays, 62 yards, 3:12; Wake Forest 10–3)

Second quarter

- (13:01) WF – Demond Claiborne 2-yard run, Matthew Dennis kick (Drive: 2 plays, 9 yards, 0:38; Wake Forest 17–3)
- (10:05) UVA – Tyler Neville 18-yard pass from Anthony Colandrea, Will Bettridge kick (Drive: 8 plays, 68 yards, 2:51; Wake Forest 17–10)
- (7:17) WF – Matthew Dennis 38-yard field goal (Drive: 8 plays, 55 yards, 2:48; Wake Forest 20–10)
- (4:26) UVA – Tyler Neville 24-yard pass from Anthony Colandrea, Will Bettridge kick (Drive: 8 plays, 75 yards, 2:44; Wake Forest 20–17)

Third quarter

- (7:40) WF – Donavon Greene 3-yard pass from Hank Bachmeier, Matthew Dennis kick (Drive: 14 plays, 75 yards, 7:20; Wake Forest 27–17)
- (2:10) WF – Matthew Dennis 26-yard field goal (Drive: 10 plays, 69 yards, 3:43; Wake Forest 30–17)

Fourth quarter

- (10:37) UVA – Trell Harris 24-yard pass from Anthony Colandrea, Will Bettridge kick (Drive: 7 plays, 66 yards, 2:49; Wake Forest 30–24)
- (2:07) UVA – Grady Brosterhous 1-yard run, Will Bettridge kick (Drive: 12 plays, 56 yards, 5:13; Virginia 31–30)

Statistics	UVA	WAKE
First downs	23	25
Total yards	430	544
Rushing yards	73	141
Passing yards	357	403
Passing: Comp–Att–Int	33–43–2	27–43–0
Time of possession	27:50	32:10

Team	Category	Player	Statistics
Virginia	Passing	Anthony Colandrea	33–43, 357 yards, 3 TD, 2 INT
Virginia	Rushing	Xavier Brown	9 carries, 35 yards
Virginia	Receiving	Malachi Fields	11 receptions, 148 yards
Wake Forest	Passing	Hank Bachmeier	27–42, 403 yards, 1 TD
Wake Forest	Rushing	Demond Claiborne	21 carries, 86 yards, 2 TD
Wake Forest	Receiving	Donavon Greene	11 receptions, 166 yards, 1 TD

=== Maryland (rivalry) ===
Game Three – Maryland Terrapins (1–1) vs Virginia Cavaliers (2–0) – Game summary

Quarter	1	2	3	4	Total
Terrapins	0	7	10	10	27
Cavaliers	3	10	0	0	13

at Scott Stadium • Charlottesville, Virginia

- Date: Saturday September 14, 2024
- Game time: 8:00 PM
- Game weather: Sunny • Temperature: 74 °F (23 °C) • Wind: NE 5 mph
- Game attendance: 41,352
- Referee: Larry Smith
- TV announcers (ACCN): Wes Durham, Tom Luginbill, and Dana Boyle

Game information

First quarter

- (0:50) UVA – Will Bettridge 19-yard field goal (Drive: 5 plays, 64 yards, 1:09; Virginia 3–0)

Second quarter

- (8:27) UVA – Will Bettridge 29-yard field goal (Drive: 13 plays, 77 yards, 5:07; Virginia 6–0)
- (0:54) MAR – Tai Felton 19-yard pass from Billy Edwards Jr., Jack Howes kick (Drive: 7 plays, 47 yards, 1:23; Maryland 7–6)
- (0:01) UVA – Anthony Colandrea 10-yard run, Will Bettridge kick (Drive: 5 plays, 71 yards, 0:49; Virginia 13–7)

Third quarter

- (10:55) MAR – Kaden Prather 26-yard pass from Billy Edwards Jr., Jack Howes kick (Drive: 8 plays, 68 yards, 3:34; Maryland 14–13)
- (2:49) MAR – Jack Howes 37-yard field goal (Drive: 8 plays, 45 yards, 3:14; Maryland 17–13)

Fourth quarter

- (12:31) MAR – Jack Howes 33-yard field goal (Drive: 11 plays, 43 yards, 3:47; Maryland 20–13)
- (7:10) MAR – Billy Edwards Jr. 1-yard run, Jack Howes kick (Drive: 8 plays, 52 yards, 4:09; Maryland 27–13)

Statistics	MD	UVA
First downs	21	18
Total yards	391	370
Rushing yards	128	123
Passing yards	263	247
Passing: Comp–Att–Int	28–43–0	21–37–2
Time of possession	35:36	24:24

Team	Category	Player	Statistics
Maryland	Passing	Billy Edwards Jr.	28–43, 263 yards, 2 TD
Maryland	Rushing	Nolan Ray	10 carries, 53 yards
Maryland	Receiving	Tai Felton	9 receptions, 117 yards, 1 TD
Virginia	Passing	Anthony Colandrea	21–37, 247 yards, 2 INT
Virginia	Rushing	Kobe Pace	11 carries, 46 yards
Virginia	Receiving	Trell Harris	4 receptions, 72 yards

=== at Coastal Carolina ===
Game Four – Virginia Cavaliers (2–1) vs Coastal Carolina Chanticleers (3-0) – Game summary

Quarter	1	2	3	4	Total
Cavaliers	14	13	10	6	43
Chanticleers	3	7	7	7	24

at Brooks Stadium • Conway, SC

- Date: Saturday September 21, 2024
- Game time: 2:00 PM
- Game weather: Sunny
- Game attendance: 22,104
- Referee: Nate Black
- TV announcers (ESPN+): Jeff McCarragher, Nate Ross, and Joanne Bethea

Game information

First quarter

- (13:36) UVA – Malachi Fields 7-yard pass from Anthony Colandrea, Will Bettridge kick (Drive: 3 plays, 13 yards, 1:20; Virginia 7–0)
- (10:11) CCU – Kade Hensley 30-yard field goal (Drive: 9 plays, 52 yards, 3:25; Virginia 7–3)
- (4:47) UVA – Grady Brosterhous 5-yard run, Will Bettridge kick (Drive: 3 plays, 35 yards, 1:22; Virginia 14–3)

Second quarter

- (11:14) UVA – Will Bettridge 22-yard field goal (Drive: 14 plays, 64 yards, 7:45; Virginia 17–3)
- (7:26) CCU – Jameson Tucker 29-yard pass from Ethan Vasko, Kade Hensley kick (Drive: 8 plays, 90 yards, 3:34; Virginia 17–10)
- (2:59) UVA – Grady Brosterhous 1-yard run, Will Bettridge kick (Drive: 10 plays, 75 yards, 4:27; Virginia 24–10)
- (0:00) UVA – Will Bettridge 47-yard field goal (Drive: 10 plays, 28 yards, 1:46; Virginia 27–10)

Third quarter

- (12:27) UVA – Will Bettridge 45-yard field goal (Drive: 6 plays, 47 yards, 2:33; Virginia 30–10)
- (6:26) UVA – Kobe Pace 1-yard run, Will Bettridge kick (Drive: 5 plays, 92 yards, 2:50; Virginia 37–10)
- (4:21) CCU – Ethan Vasko 3-yard run, Kade Hensley kick (Drive: 4 plays, 75 yards, 2:05; Virginia 37–17)

Fourth quarter

- (12:12) UVA – Malachi Fields 37-yard pass from Anthony Colandrea, Will Bettridge kick (Drive: 6 plays, 65 yards, 2:36; Virginia 43–17)
- (9:06) CCU – Bryson Graves 15-yard pass from Noah Kim, Kade Hensley kick (Drive: 8 plays, 75 yards, 3:06; Virginia 43–24)

Statistics	UVA	CCU
First downs	25	13
Total yards	525	384
Rushing yards	384	82
Passing yards	141	302
Passing: Comp–Att–Int	15–23–0	16–33–1
Time of possession	37:09	22:51

Team	Category	Player	Statistics
Virginia	Passing	Anthony Colandrea	13–20, 131 yards, 2 TD
Virginia	Rushing	Xavier Brown	9 carries, 171 yards
Virginia	Receiving	Malachi Fields	4 receptions, 65 yards, 2 TD
Coastal Carolina	Passing	Ethan Vasko	10–21, 222 yards, 1 TD, 1 INT
Coastal Carolina	Rushing	Ethan Vasko	8 carries, 24 yards, 1 TD
Coastal Carolina	Receiving	Tray Taylor	3 receptions, 70 yards

=== Boston College ===
Game Five – Boston College Eagles (4–1) vs Virginia Cavaliers (3–1) – Game summary

Quarter	1	2	3	4	Total
Eagles	7	7	0	0	14
Cavaliers	0	6	0	18	24

at Scott Stadium • Charlottesville, Virginia

- Date: Saturday October 5, 2024
- Game time: 12:00 PM
- Game attendance: 38,285
- TV announcers (ACCN): Jorge Sedano (play-by-play), Orlando Franklin (analyst), and Morgan Uber (sideline)

Game information

First quarter

- (7:38) BC – Jaedn Skeete 9-yard pass from Thomas Castellanos, Liam Connor kick (Drive: 9 plays, 78 yards, 5:28; Boston College 7–0)

Second quarter

- (13:08) BC – Kamari Morales 29-yard pass from Thomas Castellanos, Liam Connor kick (Drive: 9 plays, 80 yards, 4:31; Boston College 14–0)
- (4:46) UVA – Will Bettridge 35-yard field goal (Drive: 14 plays, 39 yards, 8:15; Boston College 14–3)
- (0:00) UVA – Will Bettridge 33-yard field goal (Drive: 11 plays, 81 yards, 1:44; Boston College 14–6)

Third quarter

- No scoring plays

Fourth quarter

- (13:29) UVA – Will Bettridge 27-yard field goal (Drive: 8 plays, 51 yards, 2:21; Boston College 14–9)
- (10:39) UVA – Malachi Fields 30-yard pass from Anthony Colandrea, Andre Greene Jr. pass to Anthony Colandrea for 2-point conversion (Drive: 2 plays, 50 yards, 0:32; Virginia 17–14)
- (6:02) UVA – Jonas Sanker 40-yard fumble return, Will Bettridge kick (Drive: 8 plays, 15 yards, 4:37; Virginia 24–14)

Statistics	BC	UVA
First downs	17	21
Total yards	319	339
Rushing yards	65	121
Passing yards	254	218
Passing: Comp–Att–Int	22–30–2	17–28–0
Time of possession	30:28	29:32

Team	Category	Player	Statistics
Boston College	Passing	Thomas Castellanos	22–30, 254 yards, 2 TD, 2 INT
Boston College	Rushing	Turbo Richard	9 carries, 51 yards
Boston College	Receiving	Lewis Bond	7 receptions, 79 yards
Virginia	Passing	Anthony Colandrea	15–26, 179 yards, 1 TD
Virginia	Rushing	Kobe Pace	19 carries, 83 yards
Virginia	Receiving	Malachi Fields	4 receptions, 63 yards, 1 TD

=== Louisville ===
Game Six – Louisville Cardinals (3–2) vs Virginia Cavaliers (4–1) – Game summary

Quarter	1	2	3	4	Total
Cardinals	0	7	10	7	24
Cavaliers	7	0	6	7	20

at Scott Stadium • Charlottesville, Virginia

- Date: Saturday October 12, 2024
- Game time: 3:30 PM
- Game weather: Sunny • Temperature: 83 °F (28 °C) • Wind: SW 5 mph
- Game attendance: 32,688
- TV announcers (ACCN): Chris Cotter (play-by-play), Mark Herzlich (analyst), and Coley Harvey (sideline)

Game information

First quarter

- (9:39) UVA – Grady Brosterhous 1-yard run (Will Bettridge kick) (Drive: 11 plays, 75 yards, 5:21; Virginia 7–0)

Second quarter

- (10:59) LOU – Isaac Brown 7-yard run (Brock Travelstead kick) (Drive: 6 plays, 72 yards, 2:16; Tied 7–7)

Third quarter

- (12:38) LOU – Brock Travelstead 31-yard field goal (Drive: 8 plays, 67 yards, 2:17; Louisville 10–7)
- (10:40) LOU – Isaac Brown 14-yard run (Brock Travelstead kick) (Drive: 1 play, 14 yards, 0:06; Louisville 17–7)
- (5:26) UVA – Will Bettridge 31-yard field goal (Drive: 12 plays, 62 yards, 5:14; Louisville 17–10)
- (1:00) UVA – Will Bettridge 23-yard field goal (Drive: 10 plays, 54 yards, 3:26; Louisville 17–13)

Fourth quarter

- (10:03) UVA – Xavier Brown 46-yard pass from Anthony Colandrea (Will Bettridge kick) (Drive: 4 plays, 77 yards, 1:44; Virginia 20–17)
- (1:55) LOU – Jamari Johnson 5-yard pass from Tyler Shough (Brock Travelstead kick) (Drive: 11 plays, 67 yards, 4:38; Louisville 24–20)

Statistics	LOU	UVA
First downs	18	22
Total yards	408	449
Rushing yards	177	148
Passing yards	231	301
Passing: Comp–Att–Int	18–31–1	27–46
Time of possession	25:16	34:44

Team	Category	Player	Statistics
Louisville	Passing	Tyler Shough	18–31, 231 yards, 1 TD, 1 INT
Louisville	Rushing	Isaac Brown	20 carries, 146 yards, 2 TD
Louisville	Receiving	Ja'Corey Brooks	5 receptions, 83 yards
Virginia	Passing	Anthony Colandrea	26–45, 279 yards, 1 TD
Virginia	Rushing	Anthony Colandrea	15 carries, 84 yards
Virginia	Receiving	Malachi Fields	9 receptions, 129 yards

=== at No. 10 Clemson ===
Game Seven – Virginia Cavaliers (4–2) vs No. 10 Clemson Tigers (5–1) − Game summary

Quarter	1	2	3	4	Total
Cavaliers	3	7	0	21	31
No. 10 Tigers	3	14	21	10	48

at Memorial Stadium • Clemson, South Carolina

- Date: Saturday October 19, 2024
- Game time: 12:00 p.m.
- Game weather: Temperature: 64 °F (18 °C) • Wind: NE 6 mph • Weather: Sunny
- Game attendance: 80,100
- Referee: Nate Black
- TV announcers (ACCN): Chris Cotter (play-by-play), Mark Herzlich (analyst), and Coley Harvey (sideline reporter)

Game information

First quarter

- (07:56) Clemson – Nolan Hauser 29-yard field goal (Drive: 11 plays, 74 yards, 5:24; Clemson 3–0)
- (00:53) Virginia – Will Bettridge 20-yard field goal (Drive: 14 plays, 80 yards, 6:58; Tied 3–3)

Second quarter

- (12:26) Virginia – Dakota Twitty 8-yard pass from Anthony Colandrea, Bettridge kick (Drive: 6 plays, 34 yards, 2:34; Virginia 10–3)
- (07:38) Clemson – Phil Mafah 1-yard run, Hauser kick (Drive: 11 plays, 80 yards, 4:42; Tied 10–10)
- (03:42) Clemson – Mafah 3-yard run, Hauser kick (Drive: 3 plays, 61 yards, 1:19; Clemson 17–10)

Third quarter

- (09:23) Clemson – Olsen Patt-Henry 11-yard pass from Cade Klubnik, Hauser kick (Drive: 11 plays, 90 yards, 5:31; Clemson 24–10)
- (04:31) Clemson – Antonio Williams 36-yard run, Hauser kick (Drive: 8 plays, 68 yards, 2:57; Clemson 31–10)
- (01:30) Clemson – Patt-Henry 40-yard pass from Klubnik, Hauser kick (Drive: 4 plays, 49 yards, 1:22; Clemson 38–10)

Fourth quarter

- (14:53) Virginia – Malachi Fields 44-yard pass from Colandrea, Bettridge kick (Drive: 5 plays, 75 yards, 1:37; Clemson 38–17)
- (08:22) Clemson – Hauser 22-yard field goal (Drive: 14 plays, 70 yards, 6:31; Clemson 41–17)
- (02:11) Virginia – Sackett Wood Jr. 8-yard pass from Tony Muskett, Kobe Pace pass from Muskett (Drive: 9 plays, 65 yards, 2:36; Clemson 41–25)
- (01:54) Clemson – T.J. Moore 34-yard pass from Klubnik, Hauser kick (Drive: 2 plays, 39 yards, 0:14; Clemson 48–25)
- (01:39) Virginia – Ethan Davies 65-yard pass from Muskett, 2 point conversion failed (Drive: 1 plays, 75 yards, 0:15; Clemson 48–31)

Statistics	UVA	CLEM
First downs	20	28
Total yards	346	539
Rushing yards	69	194
Passing yards	278	345
Passing: Comp–Att–Int	21–33–0	25–37–1
Time of possession	26:04	34:03

Team	Category	Player	Statistics
Virginia	Passing	Anthony Colandrea	15–26, 159 yards, 2 TD
Virginia	Rushing	Kobe Pace	10 carries, 35 yards
Virginia	Receiving	Malachi Fields; Ethan Davies	3 receptions, 65 yards, 1 TD; 1 reception, 65 yards, 1 TD
Clemson	Passing	Cade Klubnik	23–35, 308 yards, 3 TD, 1 INT
Clemson	Rushing	Phil Mafah	18 carries, 78 yards, 2 TD
Clemson	Receiving	T. J. Moore	4 receptions, 78 yards, 1 TD

=== North Carolina (South's Oldest Rivalry) ===
Game Eight – North Carolina Tar Heels (3–4) vs Virginia Cavaliers (4–3) – Game summary

Quarter	1	2	3	4	Total
Tar Heels	7	17	14	3	41
Cavaliers	3	3	0	8	14

at Scott Stadium • Charlottesville, Virginia

- Date: Saturday October 26, 2024
- Game time: 12:00 p.m.
- TV announcers (The CW): Thom Brennaman (play-by-play), Max Browne (analyst), and Carla Gebhart (sideline reporter)

Game information

First quarter

- (8:36) UVA – Will Bettridge 30-yard field goal (Drive: 12 plays, 31 yards, 4:40; Virginia 3–0)
- (5:23) UNC – J.J. Jones 37-yard pass from Jacolby Criswell, Noah Burnette kick (Drive: 9 plays, 75 yards, 3:13; North Carolina 7–3)

Second quarter

- (7:51) UNC – Noah Burnette 30-yard field goal (Drive: 12 plays, 68 yards, 4:50; North Carolina 10–3)
- (4:02) UVA – Will Bettridge 27-yard field goal (Drive: 11 plays, 65 yards, 3:49; North Carolina 10–6)
- (1:32) UNC – Omarion Hampton 3-yard run, Noah Burnette kick (Drive: 7 plays, 75 yards, 2:30; North Carolina 17–6)
- (0:05) UNC – J.J. Jones 31-yard pass from Jacolby Criswell, Noah Burnette kick (Drive: 7 plays, 55 yards, 1:05; North Carolina 24–6)

Third quarter

- (12:07) UNC – Omarion Hampton 8-yard run, Noah Burnette kick (Drive: 4 plays, 33 yards, 1:35; North Carolina 31–6)
- (0:17) UNC – Jahvaree Ritzie 84-yard interception return, Noah Burnette kick (Drive: 9 plays, 51 yards, 4:17; North Carolina 38–6)

Fourth quarter

- (10:07) UVA – JR Wilson 68-yard pass from Tony Muskett, Tony Muskett pass to Dakota Twitty for 2-point conversion (Drive: 3 plays, 76 yards, 0:35; North Carolina 38–14)
- (5:05) UNC – Noah Burnette 25-yard field goal (Drive: 8 plays, 39 yards, 5:02; North Carolina 41–14)

Statistics	UNC	UVA
First downs	23	17
Total yards	431	299
Rushing yards	138	18
Passing yards	293	281
Passing: Comp–Att–Int	19–30–0	24–41–2
Time of possession	31:37	38:23

Team	Category	Player	Statistics
North Carolina	Passing	Jacolby Criswell	19–30, 293 yards, 2 TD
North Carolina	Rushing	Omarion Hampton	26 carries, 105 yards, 2 TD
North Carolina	Receiving	J.J. Jones	5 receptions, 129 yards, 2 TD
Virginia	Passing	Anthony Colandrea	16–28, 156 yards, 2 INT
Virginia	Rushing	Kobe Pace	7 carries, 24 yards
Virginia	Receiving	JR Wilson	1 reception, 68 yards, 1 TD

=== at No. 18 Pittsburgh ===
Game Nine – Virginia Cavaliers (4–4) vs No. 18 Pittsburgh Panthers (7–1) – Game summary

Quarter	1	2	3	4	Total
Cavaliers	0	7	14	3	24
No. 18 Panthers	0	13	0	6	19

at Acrisure Stadium • Pittsburgh, Pennsylvania

- Date: Saturday November 9, 2024
- Game time: 8:00 p.m.
- Game attendance: 56,693
- Referee: Nate Black
- TV announcers (ACCN): Wes Durham (play-by-play), Tom Luginbill (analyst), and Dana Boyle (sideline)

Game information

First quarter

- No scoring plays

Second quarter

- (14:17) UVA – Xavier Brown 1-yard run, Will Bettridge kick (Drive: 6 plays, 78 yards, 2:31; Virginia 7–0)
- (4:48) PITT – Daniel Carter 1-yard run, Ben Sauls kick (Drive: 12 plays, 80 yards, 4:41; Tied 7–7)
- (1:59) PITT – Ben Sauls 44-yard field goal (Drive: 4 plays, -2 yards, 1:31; Pittsburgh 10–7)
- (0:08) PITT – Ben Sauls 48-yard field goal (Drive: 7 plays, 24 yards, 1:11; Pittsburgh 13–7)

Third quarter

- (5:39) UVA – Xavier Brown 24-yard pass from Anthony Colandrea, Will Bettridge kick (Drive: 5 plays, 73 yards, 1:59; Virginia 14–13)
- (3:34) UVA – Kobe Pace 3-yard run, Will Bettridge kick (Drive: 4 plays, 20 yards, 1:48; Virginia 21–13)

Fourth quarter

- (10:32) PITT – Gavin Bartholomew 4-yard pass from Nate Yarnell, 2-point pass conversion failed (Drive: 12 plays, 86 yards, 4:21; Virginia 21–19)
- (2:06) UVA – Will Bettridge 32-yard field goal (Drive: 16 plays, 60 yards, 8:26; Virginia 24–19)

Statistics	UVA	PITT
First downs	19	17
Total yards	340	292
Rushing yards	170	127
Passing yards	170	165
Passing: Comp–Att–Int	17–25–2	14–35–2
Time of possession	35:17	24:43

Team	Category	Player	Statistics
Virginia	Passing	Anthony Colandrea	16–24, 143 yards, 1 TD, 2 INT
Virginia	Rushing	Xavier Brown	15 carries, 68 yards, 1 TD
Virginia	Receiving	Chris Tyree	4 receptions, 42 yards
Pittsburgh	Passing	Eli Holstein	10–23, 121 yards
Pittsburgh	Rushing	Desmond Reid	16 carries, 80 yards
Pittsburgh	Receiving	Desmond Reid	2 receptions, 43 yards

=== at No. 8 Notre Dame ===
Game Ten – Virginia Cavaliers (5–4) vs No. 8 Notre Dame Fighting Irish (8–1) – Game summary

Quarter	1	2	3	4	Total
Cavaliers	0	0	7	7	14
No. 8 Fighting Irish	7	21	7	0	35

at Notre Dame Stadium • Notre Dame, Indiana

- Date: Saturday November 16, 2024
- Game time: 3:30 p.m.
- Game weather: Temperature: 54 °F (12 °C) • Wind: SE 9 MPH • Weather: Cloudy
- Game attendance: 77,622
- Referee: Justin Elliott
- TV announcers (NBC): Dan Hicks (play-by-play), Jason Garrett (analyst), and Zora Stephenson (sideline reporter)

Game information

First quarter

- (13:04) ND – Jeremiyah Love 4-yard run, Mitch Jeter kick (Drive: 4 plays, 25 yards, 1:52; Notre Dame 7–0)

Second quarter

- (6:34) ND – Jayden Harrison 8-yard pass from Reily Leonard, Mitch Jeter kick (Drive: 9 plays, 88 yards, 3:42; Notre Dame 14–0)
- (2:20) ND – Cooper Flanagan 64-yard run, Zac Yoakam kick (Drive: 3 plays, 75 yards, 1:08; Notre Dame 21–7)
- (5:05) ND – Jeremiyah Love 2-yard pass from Reily Leonard, Mitch Jeter kick (Drive: 1 play, 2 yards, 0:03; Notre Dame 21–0)
- (0:49) ND – Mitchell Evans 16-yard pass from Reily Leonard,

Mitch Jeter kick (Drive: 3 plays, 32 yards, 0:34; Notre Dame 28–0)

Third quarter

- (8:44) NAVY – Eli Heidenreich 1-yard run, Nathan Kirkwood kick (Drive: 12 plays, 75 yards, 6:16; Notre Dame 31–14)
- (9:38) ND – Jeremiyah Love 76-yard run, Mitch Jeter kick (Drive: 5 plays, 75 yards, 1:46; Notre Dame 35–0)
- (7:52) VA – Tony Muskett 18-yard run, Will Bettridge kick (Drive: 5 plays, 75 yards, 1:46; Notre Dame 35–7)

Fourth quarter

- (0:18) VA – Tony Muskett 2-yard run, Will Bettridge kick (Drive: 16 plays, 80 yards, 5:42; Notre Dame 35–14)

Statistics	UVA	ND
First downs	15	21
Total yards	300	448
Rushing yards	128	234
Passing yards	172	214
Passing: Comp–Att–Int	17–36–3	22–33–1
Time of possession	25:20	34:40

Team	Category	Player	Statistics
Virginia	Passing	Tony Muskett	9–14, 103 yards
Virginia	Rushing	Xavier Brown	11 carries, 52 yards
Virginia	Receiving	Malachi Fields	4 receptions, 81 yards
Notre Dame	Passing	Riley Leonard	22–33, 214 yards, 3 TD, 1 INT
Notre Dame	Rushing	Jeremiyah Love	16 carries, 137 yards, 2 TD
Notre Dame	Receiving	Jayden Harrison	3 receptions, 41 yards, 1 TD

=== No. 13 SMU ===
Game Eleven – No. 13 SMU Mustangs (9–1) vs Virginia Cavaliers (5–5) – Game summary

Quarter	1	2	3	4	Total
No. 13 Mustangs	7	10	3	13	33
Cavaliers	0	0	0	7	7

at Scott Stadium • Charlottesville, Virginia

- Date: Saturday November 23, 2024
- Game time: 12:00 p.m.
- Game weather: Sunny • Temperature: 56 °F (13 °C) • Wind: NW 9 miles per hour (14 km/h)
- Game attendance: 36,305
- Referee: Jerry Magallanes
- TV announcers (ESPN2): Roy Philpott (play-by-play), Sam Acho (analyst), and Taylor Davis (sideline reporter)

Game information

First quarter

- SMU – Brashard Smith 4-yard run (Collin Rogers kick), 7:58. Mustangs 7–0. Drive: 7 plays, 78 yards, 1:52.

Second quarter

- SMU – Jordan Hudson 17-yard pass from Kevin Jennings (Collin Rogers kick), 5:52. Mustangs 14–0. Drive: 9 plays, 76 yards, 3:27.
- SMU – Collin Rogers 35-yard field goal, 1:25. Mustangs 17–0. Drive: 10 plays, 58 yards, 2:39.

Third quarter

- SMU – Collin Rogers 39-yard field goal, 10:12. Mustangs 20–0. Drive: 6 plays, 6 yards, 2:35.

Fourth quarter

- SMU – Kevin Jennings 1-yard run (run failed), 12:21. Mustangs 26–0. Drive: 14 plays, 74 yards, 7:17.
- UVA – Malachi Fields 4-yard pass from Anthony Colandrea (Will Bettridge kick), 4:16. Mustangs 26–7. Drive: 9 plays, 27 yards, 4:25.
- SMU – Matthew Hibner 16-yard pass from Kevin Jennings (Collin Rogers kick), 1:42. Mustangs 33–7. Drive: 5 plays, 42 yards, 2:33.

Statistics	SMU	UVA
First downs	20	14
Total yards	434	173
Rushing yards	111	65
Passing yards	323	108
Passing: Comp–Att–Int	25–33–1	18–27–0
Time of possession	28:25	31:35

Team	Category	Player	Statistics
SMU	Passing	Kevin Jennings	25–33, 323 yards, 2 TD, 1 INT
SMU	Rushing	Brashard Smith	19 carries, 63 yards, 1 TD
SMU	Receiving	Moochie Dixon	4 receptions, 89 yards
Virginia	Passing	Anthony Colandrea	18–27, 108 yards, 1 TD
Virginia	Rushing	Noah Vaughn	10 carries, 44 yards
Virginia	Receiving	Malachi Fields	4 receptions, 42 yards, 1 TD

=== at Virginia Tech (rivalry) ===
Game Twelve – Virginia Cavaliers (5–6) vs Virginia Tech Hokies (5–6) – Game summary

Quarter	1	2	3	4	Total
Cavaliers	0	3	8	6	17
Hokies	10	10	10	7	37

at Lane Stadium • Blacksburg, Virginia

- Date: Saturday November 30, 2024
- Game time: 8:00 p.m.
- Game weather: Temperature: 31 °F (−1 °C) • Wind: SW 4 mph • Weather: Sunny
- Game attendance: 65,632
- TV announcers (ACCN): Wes Durham (play-by-play), Tom Luginbill (analyst), and Dana Boyle (sideline)

Game information

First quarter

- (9:06) VT – Bhayshul Tuten 6-yard run, John Love kick (Drive: 11 plays, 90 yards, 5:49; Virginia Tech 7–0)
- (1:16) VT – John Love 44-yard field goal (Drive: 12 plays, 44 yards, 6:51; Virginia Tech 10–0)

Second quarter

- (2:46) UVA – Will Bettridge 37-yard field goal (Drive: 6 plays, 34 yards, 2:49; Virginia Tech 10–3)
- (1:50) VT – Jaylin Lane 66-yard pass from William Watson III, John Love kick (Drive: 2 plays, 75 yards, 0:56; Virginia Tech 17–3)
- (0:00) VT – John Love 31-yard field goal (Drive: 5 plays, 32 yards, 0:54; Virginia Tech 20–3)

Third quarter

- (10:05) VT – William Watson III 5-yard run, John Love kick (Drive: 5 plays, 45 yards, 2:13; Virginia 27–3)
- (5:23) UVA – Tony Muskett 2-yard run, Tony Muskett pass to Tyler Neville for 2-point conversion (Drive: 10 plays, 75 yards, 4:42; Virginia Tech 27–11)
- (3:08) VT – John Love 28-yard field goal (Drive: 7 plays, 64 yards, 2:15; Virginia Tech 30–11)

Fourth quarter

- (13:12) UVA – Tony Muskett 5-yard run, 2-point pass conversion failed (Drive: 11 plays, 75 yards, 4:56; Virginia Tech 30–17)
- (6:12) VT – Bhayshul Tuten 58-yard run, John Love kick (Drive: 4 plays, 77 yards, 2:28; Virginia Tech 37–17)

Statistics	UVA	VT
First downs	19	21
Total yards	274	458
Rushing yards	96	204
Passing yards	178	254
Passing: Comp–Att–Int	19–36–2	14–21
Time of possession	28:42	31:18

Team	Category	Player	Statistics
Virginia	Passing	Tony Muskett	19–36, 178 yards, 2 INT
Virginia	Rushing	Tony Muskett	18 carries, 62 yards, 2 TD
Virginia	Receiving	Suderian Harrison	5 receptions, 54 yards
Virginia Tech	Passing	William "Pop" Watson III	14–21, 254 yards, 1 TD
Virginia Tech	Rushing	Bhayshul Tuten	18 carries, 124 yards, 2 TD
Virginia Tech	Receiving	Jaylin Lane	4 receptions, 91 yards, 1 TD
