= 2024 Boston College Eagles football team =

American college football season

2024 Boston College Eagles football

Pinstripe Bowl, L 15–20 vs. Nebraska
- Conference: Atlantic Coast Conference
- Record: 7–6 (4–4 ACC)
- Head coach: Bill O'Brien (1st season)
- Offensive coordinator: Will Lawing (1st season)
- Offensive scheme: Spread
- Defensive coordinator: Tim Lewis (1st season)
- Base defense: 4–3
- Home stadium: Alumni Stadium

2024 Atlantic Coast Conference football standings
	Conf.			Overall
Team	W		L	W		L
No. 12 SMU y^	8	–	0	11	–	3
No. 14 Clemson y$^	7	–	1	10	–	4
No. 18 Miami (FL)	6	–	2	10	–	3
No. 20 Syracuse	5	–	3	10	–	3
Duke	5	–	3	9	–	4
Louisville	5	–	3	9	–	4
Georgia Tech	5	–	3	7	–	6
Boston College	4	–	4	7	–	6
Virginia Tech	4	–	4	6	–	7
Pittsburgh	3	–	5	7	–	6
NC State	3	–	5	6	–	7
North Carolina	3	–	5	6	–	7
Virginia	3	–	5	5	–	7
California	2	–	6	6	–	7
Wake Forest	2	–	6	4	–	8
Stanford	2	–	6	3	–	9
Florida State	1	–	7	2	–	10
Championship: Clemson 34, SMU 31
^ – College Football Playoff participant; $ – Conference champion; y – Championship game participant; Rankings from AP Poll

The 2024 Boston College Eagles football team represented Boston College as a member of the Atlantic Coast Conference (ACC) during the 2024 NCAA Division I FBS football season. The Eagles were led by Bill O'Brien in his first season as their head coach. They played their home games at Alumni Stadium located in Chestnut Hill, Massachusetts.

== Schedule ==
Date	Time	Opponent	Rank	Site	TV	Result	Attendance
September 2	7:30 p.m.	at No. 10 Florida State		Doak Campbell Stadium; Tallahassee, FL	ESPN	W 28–13	51,719
September 7	3:30 p.m.	Duquesne*		Alumni Stadium; Chestnut Hill, MA	ACCNX/ESPN+	W 56–0	38,441
September 14	12:45 p.m.	at No. 6 Missouri*	No. 24	Faurot Field; Columbia, MO	SECN	L 21–27	62,621
September 21	8:00 p.m.	Michigan State*		Alumni Stadium; Chestnut Hill, MA	ACCN	W 23–19	44,500
September 28	12:00 p.m.	Western Kentucky*		Alumni Stadium; Chestnut Hill, MA	ACCN	W 21–20	41,403
October 5	12:00 p.m.	at Virginia		Scott Stadium; Charlottesville, VA	ACCN	L 14–24	38,285
October 17	7:30 p.m.	at Virginia Tech		Lane Stadium; Blacksburg, VA (rivalry)	ESPN	L 21–42	65,632
October 25	7:30 p.m.	Louisville		Alumni Stadium; Chestnut Hill, MA	ESPN2	L 27–31	42,887
November 9	12:00 p.m.	Syracuse		Alumni Stadium; Chestnut Hill, MA	The CW	W 37–31	44,500
November 16	3:30 p.m.	at No. 14 SMU		Gerald J. Ford Stadium; University Park, TX	ESPN	L 28–38	34,438
November 23	12:00 p.m.	North Carolina		Alumni Stadium; Chestnut Hill, MA	The CW	W 41–21	37,801
November 30	3:00 p.m.	Pittsburgh		Alumni Stadium; Chestnut Hill, MA	The CW	W 34–23	29,704
December 28	12:00 p.m.	vs. Nebraska*		Yankee Stadium; Bronx, NY (Pinstripe Bowl)	ABC	L 15–20	30,062
*Non-conference game; Rankings from AP Poll - Released prior to game; All times are in Eastern time

== Personnel ==
=== Recruits ===
==== 2024 recruiting class ====
Boston College signed 13 players in the class of 2024.

College recruiting
Name	Hometown	School	Height	Weight	Commit date
Pape Abdoulaye Sy; OT	London, England	NFL Academy	6 ft 6 in (1.98 m)	295 lb (134 kg)	Dec 11, 2023
Pape Abdoulaye Sy; OT	Recruit ratings: Rivals: 247Sports: On3: ESPN: (71)				
Ryan Boultwood; TE	Walnut, California	Mt. San Antonio College	6 ft 4 in (1.93 m)	225 lb (102 kg)	Dec 15, 2023
Ryan Boultwood; TE	Recruit ratings: Rivals: 247Sports: On3: ESPN: (75)				
Charlie Comella; ATH	Westwood, Massachusetts	Xaverian Brothers	6 ft 1 in (1.85 m)	175 lb (79 kg)	Jun 14, 2023
Charlie Comella; ATH	Recruit ratings: Rivals: 247Sports: On3: ESPN: (76)				
Kemori Dixon; S	Danville, Virginia	George Washington	6 ft 1 in (1.85 m)	200 lb (91 kg)	Jun 8, 2023
Kemori Dixon; S	Recruit ratings: Rivals: 247Sports: On3: ESPN: (76)				
Jayzen Flint; EDGE	Philadelphia, Pennsylvania	West Catholic Prep	6 ft 3 in (1.91 m)	225 lb (102 kg)	Jun 25, 2023
Jayzen Flint; EDGE	Recruit ratings: Rivals: 247Sports: On3: ESPN: (73)				
Jadon Lafontant; IOL	Greenwich, Connecticut	Brunswick School	6 ft 3 in (1.91 m)	285 lb (129 kg)	Dec 11, 2023
Jadon Lafontant; IOL	Recruit ratings: Rivals: 247Sports: On3: ESPN: (76)				
Cedric Lott Jr. WR	Mesquite, Texas	John Horn	6 ft 5 in (1.96 m)	200 lb (91 kg)	Oct 3, 2023
Cedric Lott Jr. WR	Recruit ratings: Rivals: 247Sports: On3: ESPN: (75)				
Ashton McShane; CB	McKinney, Texas	McKinney	5 ft 11 in (1.80 m)	165 lb (75 kg)	Jun 20, 2023
Ashton McShane; CB	Recruit ratings: Rivals: 247Sports: On3: ESPN: (75)				
Johnathan Montague Jr. QB	Clayton, North Carolina	Clayton	6 ft 2 in (1.88 m)	205 lb (93 kg)	Dec 18, 2023
Johnathan Montague Jr. QB	Recruit ratings: Rivals: 247Sports: On3: ESPN: (76)				
Judah Pruitt; IOL	Newark, New Jersey	Malcolm X Shabazz	6 ft 5 in (1.96 m)	315 lb (143 kg)	Jun 18, 2023
Judah Pruitt; IOL	Recruit ratings: Rivals: 247Sports: On3: ESPN: (77)				
Turbo Richard; RB	Rock Hill, South Carolina	Northwestern	5 ft 10 in (1.78 m)	207 lb (94 kg)	Jun 13, 2023
Turbo Richard; RB	Recruit ratings: Rivals: 247Sports: On3: ESPN: (78)				
Omar Thornton; LB	Fort Lauderdale, Florida	American Heritage School	6 ft 0 in (1.83 m)	195 lb (88 kg)	Jan 24, 2024
Omar Thornton; LB	Recruit ratings: Rivals: 247Sports: On3: ESPN: (77)				
Syair Torrence; WR	Syracuse, New York	Christian Brothers Academy	5 ft 11 in (1.80 m)	195 lb (88 kg)	Dec 20, 2023
Syair Torrence; WR	Recruit ratings: Rivals: 247Sports: On3: ESPN: (77)				

=== Transfer portal ===
Outgoing transfers
Player	Position	Destination
Alex Washington	S	None
Andre Hines	RB	Wagner
Shitta Sillah	DE	Purdue
Jason Scott	CB	Delaware
Patrick Garwo	RB	Nevada
Joshua Hardy	DE	North Carolina A&T
Xavier Coleman	RB	Lamar
Cam Barfield	RB	Hawaii
Jaden Williams	WR	Texas State
Emmett Morehead	QB	Old Dominion
CJ Clinkscales	CB	Charlotte
Taji Johnson	WR	Buffalo
Hans Lillis	TE	Eastern Michigan
Charlie Gordinier	TE	None
Joseph Griffin Jr.	WR	Wisconsin
Connor Lytton	K	None
Matthew Rueve	QB	Findlay

Incoming transfers
Player	Position	Previous School
Kamari Morales	TE	North Carolina
Treshaun Ward	RB	Kansas State
Ryan Turner	CB	Ohio State
Cameron Martinez	S	Ohio State
Jayden McGowan	WR	Vanderbilt
Jerand Bradley	WR	Texas Tech
Jordan McDonald	RB	UCF
Bryquice Brown	CB	Georgia State
Sedarius McConnell	DL	Illinois
Grayson James	QB	FIU

== Game summaries ==
=== at No. 10 Florida State ===
Game One – Boston College Eagles (0–0) vs No. 10 Florida State Seminoles (0–1) – Game summary

Quarter	1	2	3	4	Total
Eagles	0	14	14	0	28
No. 10 Seminoles	0	6	7	0	13

at Doak Campbell Stadium • Tallahassee, FL

- Date: Monday, September 2, 2024
- Game time: 7:30 p.m. EDT/4:30 p.m. PDT
- Game weather: Partly cloudy, 93 °F (34 °C)
- Game attendance: 51,719
- Referee: Gary Patterson
- TV announcers (ESPN): Bob Wischusen (play-by-play), Louis Riddick (analyst), and Kris Budden (sideline reporter)

Game information

First quarter

- No scoring

Second quarter

- 14:56, BC – Thomas Castellanos 4-yard run (Luca Lombardo kick), (Drive: 14 plays, 71 yards, 9:18; Boston College 7–0)
- 9:58, BC – Treshaun Ward 13-yard pass from Thomas Castellanos (Luca Lombardo kick), (Drive: 7 plays, 68 yards, 3:19; Boston College 14–0)
- 5:05, FSU – Ryan Fitzgerald 31-yard field goal, (Drive: 7 plays, 22 yards, 2:03; Boston College 14–3)
- 0:25, FSU – Ryan Fitzgerald 24-yard field goal, (Drive: 13 plays, 70 yards, 2:35; Boston College 14–6)

Third quarter

- 11:58, BC – Kye Robichaux 4-yard pass from Thomas Castellanos (Luca Lombardo kick), (Drive: 2 plays, 7 yards, 0:43; Boston College 21–6)
- 5:19, FSU – Kentron Poitier 29-yard pass from DJ Uiagalelei (Ryan Fitzgerald kick), (Drive: 5 plays, 72 yards, 1:58; Boston College 21–13)
- 1:03, BC – Kye Robichaux 2-yard run (Luca Lombardo kick), (Drive: 8 plays, 60 yards, 4:16; Boston College 28–13)

Fourth quarter

- No scoring

Statistics	BC	FSU
First downs	19	13
Total yards	369	293
Rushing yards	263	21
Passing yards	106	272
Passing: Comp–Att–Int	10-16-0	21–42–1
Time of possession	39:09	20:51

Team	Category	Player	Statistics
Boston College	Passing	Thomas Castellanos	10/16, 106 yards, 2 TDs
Boston College	Rushing	Kye Robichaux	19 carries, 85 yards, TD
Boston College	Receiving	Treshaun Ward	3 receptions, 61 yards, TD
Florida State	Passing	DJ Uiagalelei	21/42, 272 yards, TD, INT
Florida State	Rushing	Kam Davis	3 carries, 11 yards
Florida State	Receiving	Kentron Poitier	3 receptions, 79 yards, TD

=== vs Duquesne ===
Duquesne Dukes (0–1) at Boston College Eagles (1–0) – Game summary

Quarter	1	2	3	4	Total
Dukes	0	0	0	0	0
Eagles	14	28	7	7	56

at Alumni Stadium • Chestnut Hill, Massachusetts

- Date: September 7th
- Game time: 3:30 p.m. EST/12:30 p.m. PST
- TV announcers (ACCNX/ESPN+): Bill Spaulding (play-by-play) and Craig Haubert (analyst)

Game information

First quarter

Second quarter

Third quarter

Fourth quarter

Statistics	DUQ	BC
First downs	9	22
Total yards	135	563
Rushing yards	60	306
Passing yards	75	257
Passing: Comp–Att–Int	10–23–2	11–13–0
Time of possession	29:57	30:03

Team	Category	Player	Statistics
Duquesne	Passing	Darius Perrantes	8/18, 62 yards, 2 INT
Duquesne	Rushing	JaMario Clements	10 carries, 45 yards
Duquesne	Receiving	Tedy Afful	4 receptions, 48 yards
Boston College	Passing	Thomas Castellanos	9/10, 234 yards, 4 TD
Boston College	Rushing	Turbo Richard	15 carries, 74 yards
Boston College	Receiving	Lewis Bond	5 receptions, 98 yards, TD

=== at No. 6 Missouri ===
No. 24 Boston College Eagles (2-0) at No. 6 Missouri Tigers (2-0) – Game summary

Quarter	1	2	3	4	Total
No. 24 Eagles	7	7	0	7	21
No. 6 Tigers	3	14	7	3	27

at Faurot Field • Columbia, Missouri

- Date: September 14th
- Game time: 12:45 p.m. EST/9:45 a.m. PST
- Game weather: Temperature: 80 °F (27 °C) • Wind: SE at 7 miles per hour (11 km/h) • Weather: Mostly Cloudy
- Game attendance: 62,621
- TV announcers (SECN): Taylor Zarzour (play-by-play), Matt Stinchcomb (analyst), and Alyssa Lang (sideline reporter)

Game information

First quarter

- (7:31) BC: Jerand Bradley 12 yard pass from Thomas Castellanos (Luca Lombardo Kick). (Drive: 14 plays, 75 yards, 7:29; Boston College 7-0)
- (2:49) MIZZ: Blake Craig 38 yard field goal (Drive: 11 plays, 60 yards, 4:37; Boston College 7-3)

Second quarter

- (9:44) BC: Reed Harris 67 yard pass from Thomas Castellanos (Luca Lombardo Kick). (Drive: 4 plays, 86 yards, 1:32; Boston College 14-3)
- (4:54) MIZZ: Blake Craig 38 yard field goal (Drive: 10 plays, 67 yards, 4:50; Boston College 14-6)
- (3:04) MIZZ: Luther Burden III 19 yard pass from Brady Cook (Nate Noel Run for Two Point Conversion) (Drive: 3 plays, 25 yards, 1:16; Tied 14-14)
- (0:00) MIZZ: Blake Craig 56 yard field goal (Drive: 6 plays, 53 yards, 0:46; Missouri 17-14)

Third quarter

- (10:31) MIZZ: Brady Cook 6 yard run (Blake Craig Kick) (Drive: 9 plays, 75 yards, 4:29; Missouri 24-14)

Fourth quarter

- (5:58) MIZZ: Blake Craig 31 yard field goal (Drive: 14 plays, 48 yards, 7:24; Missouri 27-14)
- (3:45) BC: Kamari Morales 38 yard pass from Thomas Castellanos (Luca Lombardo Kick). (Drive: 8 plays, 75 yards, 2:13; Missouri 27-21)

Statistics	BC	MIZZ
First downs	16	22
Total yards	54–298	73–440
Rushing yards	26–49	43–176
Passing yards	249	264
Passing: Comp–Att–Int	16–28–2	21–30–0
Time of possession	24:14	35:46

Team	Category	Player	Statistics
Boston College	Passing	Thomas Castellanos	16/28, 249 yards, 3 TD, 2 INT
Boston College	Rushing	Treshaun Ward	6 carries, 21 yards
Boston College	Receiving	Reed Harris	1 reception, 67 yards, TD
Missouri	Passing	Brady Cook	21/30, 264 yards, TD
Missouri	Rushing	Nate Noel	22 carries, 121 yards
Missouri	Receiving	Luther Burden III	6 receptions, 117 yards, TD

=== vs Michigan State ===
Michigan State Spartans (3-0) at Boston College Eagles (2-1) – Game summary

Quarter	1	2	3	4	Total
Spartans	3	10	3	3	19
Eagles	0	6	10	7	23

at Alumni Stadium • Chestnut Hill, Massachusetts

- Date: September 21st
- Game time: 8:00 p.m. EST/5:00 p.m. PST
- Game weather: 58 °F (14 °C), Rainy
- Game attendance: 44,500
- Referee: Mark Kluczynski
- TV announcers (ACCN): Wes Durham (play-by-play), Tom Luginbill (analyst), and Dana Boyle (sideline)
- BCEagle.com box score

Game information

First quarter

- (09:11) MSU FG: Jonathan Kim 41-yard field goal MSU 3–0; 9 plays, 26 yards, 3:48

Second quarter

- (12:22) BC TD: Turbo Richard 11-yard run (Luca Lombardo miss) BC 6–3; 11 plays, 64 yards, 6:08
- (08:10) MSU TD: Aidan Chiles 1-yard run (Jonathan Kim kick) MSU 10–6; 9 plays, 75 yards, 4:12
- (00:20) MSU FG: Jonathan Kim 26-yard field goal MSU 13–6; 8 plays, 51 yards, 1:23

Third quarter

- (12:35) BC FG: Luca Lombardo 39-yard field goal MSU 13–9; 4 plays, 16 yards, 2:04
- (12:22) BC TD: Treshaun Ward 36-yard run (Luca Lombardo kick) BC 16–13; 1 plays, 36 yards, 00:08
- (09:06) MSU FG: Jonathan Kim 51-yard field goal Tied 16–16; 8 plays, 42 yards, 3:14

Fourth quarter

- (04:12) MSU FG: Jonathan Kim 27-yard field goal MSU 19–16; 18 plays, 89 yards, 9:24
- (01:28) BC TD: Lewis Bond 42-yard pass from Thomas Castellanos (Luca Lombardo kick) BC 23–19; 6 plays, 75 yards, 2:44

Statistics	MSU	BC
First downs	21	16
Total yards	68–368	60–292
Rushing yards	33–127	44–152
Passing yards	241	140
Passing: Comp–Att–Int	17–35–3	10–16–0
Time of possession	32:30	27:30

Team	Category	Player	Statistics
Michigan State	Passing	Aidan Chiles	17/35, 241 yards, 3 INT
Michigan State	Rushing	Kay'Ron Lynch-Adams	15 carries, 61 yards
Michigan State	Receiving	Montorie Foster	4 receptions, 87 yards
Boston College	Passing	Thomas Castellanos	10/16, 140 yards, 1 TD
Boston College	Rushing	Treshaun Ward	14 carries, 102 yards, 1 TD
Boston College	Receiving	Lewis Bond	6 receptions, 102 yards, 1 TD

=== vs Western Kentucky ===
Western Kentucky Hilltoppers (3-1) at Boston College Eagles (3-1) – Game summary

Quarter	1	2	3	4	Total
Hilltoppers	7	10	3	0	20
Eagles	0	7	0	14	21

at Alumni Stadium • Chestnut Hill, Massachusetts

- Date: September 28th
- Game time: 12:00 p.m. EST/9:00 a.m. PST
- Game weather: Cloudy
- Game attendance: 41,403
- Referee: Ron Hudson
- TV announcers (ACCN): Jorge Sedano (play-by-play), Orlando Franklin (analyst) and Morgan Uber (sideline)

Game information

First quarter

- WKU – Kisean Johnson 3-yard pass from Caden Veltkamp (Lucas Carneiro kick), 3:05. Western Kentucky 7–0. Drive: 8 plays, 63 yards, 3:46.

Second quarter

- WKU – Easton Messer 7-yard pass from Caden Veltkamp (Lucas Carneiro kick), 12:01. Western Kentucky 14–0. Drive: 6 plays, 47 yards, 2:51.
- BC – Kye Robichaux 3-yard run (Liam Connor kick), 2:08. Western Kentucky 14–7. Drive: 13 plays, 74 yards, 5:59.
- WKU – Lucas Carneiro 22-yard field goal, 0:00. Western Kentucky 17–7. Drive: 12 plays, 71 yards, 2:08.

Third quarter

- WKU – Lucas Carneiro 35-yard field goal, 8:44. Western Kentucky 20–7. Drive: 12 plays, 36 yards, 5:05.

Fourth quarter

- BC – Grayson James 1-yard run (Liam Connor kick), 11:36. Western Kentucky 20–14. Drive: 9 plays, 57 yards, 3:43.
- BC – Jerand Bradley 8-yard pass from Grayson James (Liam Connor kick), 3:33. Boston College 21–20. Drive: 6 plays, 20 yards, 2:50.

Statistics	WKU	BC
First downs	20	19
Total yards	78–355	67–279
Rushing yards	39–123	35–111
Passing yards	232	168
Passing: Comp–Att–Int	25–39–2	19–32–1
Time of possession	30:40	29:20

Team	Category	Player	Statistics
Western Kentucky	Passing	Caden Veltkamp	25/39, 232 yards, 2 TD, 2 INT
Western Kentucky	Rushing	Elijah Young	21 carries, 85 yards
Western Kentucky	Receiving	River Helms	4 receptions, 72 yards
Boston College	Passing	Grayson James	19/32, 168 yards, TD, INT
Boston College	Rushing	Kye Robichaux	18 carries, 81 yards, TD
Boston College	Receiving	Jaedn Skeete	4 receptions, 55 yards

=== at Virginia ===
Boston College Eagles (4-1) at Virginia Cavaliers (3-1) – Game summary

Quarter	1	2	3	4	Total
Eagles	7	7	0	0	14
Cavaliers	0	6	0	18	24

at Scott Stadium • Charlottesville, Virginia

- Date: October 5th
- Game time: 12:00 p.m. EST/9:00 a.m. PST
- Game attendance: 38,285
- TV announcers (ACCN): Jorge Sedano (play-by-play), Orlando Franklin (analyst) and Morgan Uber (sideline)

Game information

First quarter

- (7:38) BC – Jaedn Skeete 9-yard pass from Thomas Castellanos, Liam Connor kick (Drive: 9 plays, 78 yards, 5:28; Boston College 7–0)

Second quarter

- (13:08) BC – Kamari Morales 29-yard pass from Thomas Castellanos, Liam Connor kick (Drive: 9 plays, 80 yards, 4:31; Boston College 14–0)
- (4:46) UVA – Will Bettridge 35-yard field goal (Drive: 14 plays, 39 yards, 8:15; Boston College 14–3)
- (0:00) UVA – Will Bettridge 33-yard field goal (Drive: 11 plays, 81 yards, 1:44; Boston College 14–6)

Third quarter

- No scoring plays

Fourth quarter

- (13:29) UVA – Will Bettridge 27-yard field goal (Drive: 8 plays, 51 yards, 2:21; Boston College 14–9)
- (10:39) UVA – Malachi Fields 30-yard pass from Anthony Colandrea, Andre Greene Jr. pass to Anthony Colandrea for 2-point conversion (Drive: 2 plays, 50 yards, 0:32; Virginia 17–14)
- (6:02) UVA – Jonas Sanker 40-yard fumble return, Will Bettridge kick (Drive: 8 plays, 15 yards, 4:37; Virginia 24–14)

Statistics	BC	UVA
First downs	17	21
Total yards	319	339
Rushing yards	65	121
Passing yards	254	218
Passing: Comp–Att–Int	22-30-2	17-28-0
Time of possession	30:28	29:32

Team	Category	Player	Statistics
Boston College	Passing	Thomas Castellanos	22–30, 254 yards, 2 TD, 2 INT
Boston College	Rushing	Turbo Richard	9 carries, 51 yards
Boston College	Receiving	Lewis Bond	7 receptions, 79 yards
Virginia	Passing	Anthony Colandrea	15–26, 179 yards, 1 TD
Virginia	Rushing	Kobe Pace	19 carries, 83 yards
Virginia	Receiving	Malachi Fields	4 receptions, 63 yards, 1 TD

=== at Virginia Tech (rivalry) ===
Boston College Eagles (4–2) at Virginia Tech Hokies (3–3) – Game summary

Quarter	1	2	3	4	Total
Eagles	0	0	21	0	21
Hokies	14	14	0	14	42

at Lane Stadium • Blacksburg, Virginia

- Date: October 17th
- Game time: 7:30 p.m. EST/4:30 p.m. PST
- Game weather: Sunny • Temperature: 48 °F (9 °C) • Wind: NW 1 mile per hour (1.6 km/h)
- Game attendance: 65,632
- Referee: Justin Elliott
- TV announcers (ESPN): Matt Barrie (play-by-play), Dan Mullen (analyst) and Harry Lyles Jr. (sideline)

Game information

First quarter

- (6:15) VT – Kyron Drones 11-yard run, John Love kick (Drive: 11 plays, 88 yards, 5:44; Virginia Tech 7–0)
- (3:06) VT – Kyron Drones 1-yard run, John Love kick (Drive: 4 plays, 19 yards, 1:42; Virginia Tech 14–0)

Second quarter

- (12:40) VT – Bhayshul Tuten 83-yard run, John Love kick (Drive: 2 plays, 94 yards, 0:46; Virginia Tech 21–0)
- (0:11) VT – Bhayshul Tuten 20-yard pass from Kyron Drones, John Love kick (Drive: 6 plays, 85 yards, 1:04; Virginia Tech 28–0)

Third quarter

- (8:48) BC – Treshaun Ward 25-yard pass from Thomas Castellanos, Liam Connor kick (Drive: 6 plays, 80 yards, 3:11; Virginia Tech 28–7)
- (6:07) BC – Jeremiah Franklin 11-yard pass from Thomas Castellanos, Liam Connor kick (Drive: 4 plays, 29 yards, 2:04; Virginia Tech 28–14)
- (2:55) BC – Kye Robichaux 5-yard run, Liam Connor kick (Drive: 6 plays, 18 yards, 2:59; Virginia Tech 28–21)

Fourth quarter

- (11:02) VT – Bhayshul Tuten 6-yard run, John Love kick (Drive: 3 plays, 49 yards, 1:26; Virginia Tech 35–21)
- (8:28) VT – Bhayshul Tuten 61-yard run, John Love kick (Drive: 1 play, 51 yards, 0:10; Virginia Tech 42–21)

Statistics	BC	VT
First downs	22	22
Total yards	372	532
Rushing yards	167	368
Passing yards	205	164
Passing: Comp–Att–Int	17–26–0	14–18–1
Time of possession	33:34	26:26

Team	Category	Player	Statistics
Boston College	Passing	Thomas Castellanos	17/26, 205 yards, 2 TD
Boston College	Rushing	Turbo Richard	9 carries, 64 yards
Boston College	Receiving	Jeremiah Franklin	3 receptions, 49 yards, TD
Virginia Tech	Passing	Kyron Drones	14/18, 164 yards, TD, INT
Virginia Tech	Rushing	Bhayshul Tuten	18 carries, 266 yards, 3 TD
Virginia Tech	Receiving	Benji Gosnell	4 receptions, 49 yards

=== vs Louisville ===
Louisville Cardinals (4-3) at Boston College Eagles (4-3) – Game summary

Quarter	1	2	3	4	Total
Cardinals	0	7	10	14	31
Eagles	7	13	7	0	27

at Alumni Stadium • Chestnut Hill, Massachusetts

- Date: October 25th
- Game time: 7:30 p.m. EST/4:30 p.m. PST
- Game weather: Clear, 52 °F (11 °C)
- Game attendance: 42,887
- Referee: Nate Black
- TV announcers (ESPN2): Anish Shroff (play-by-play), Andre Ware (analyst) and Morgan Uber (sideline)

Game information

First quarter

- (7:26) BC – Kamari Morales 54-yard pass from Thomas Castellanos (Liam Connor kick) (Drive: 4 plays, 56 yards, 1:42; Boston College 7–0)

Second quarter

- (10:24) BC – Treshaun Ward 4-yard pass from Thomas Castellanos (Liam Connor kick) (Drive: 10 plays, 61 yards, 4:31; Boston College 14–0)
- (6:30) BC – Kye Robichaux 4-yard run (Liam Connor PAT failed) (Drive: 7 plays, 46 yards, 3:21; Boston College 20–0)
- (1:17) LOU – Isaac Brown 4-yard run (Brock Travelstead kick) (Drive: 10 plays, 76 yards, 5:07; Boston College 20–7)

Third quarter

- (10:42) LOU – Brock Travelstead 23-yard field goal (Drive: 11 plays, 69 yards, 4:10; Boston College 20–10)
- (7:58) BC – Jeremiah Franklin 6-yard pass from Thomas Castellanos (Liam Connor kick) (Drive: 5 plays, 74 yards, 2:37; Boston College 27–10)
- (3:50) LOU – Nate Kurisky 4-yard pass from Tyler Shough (Brock Travelstead kick) (Drive: 9 plays, 83 yards, 4:03; Boston College 27–17)

Fourth quarter

- (10:57) LOU – Isaac Brown 18-yard run (Brock Travelstead kick) (Drive: 4 plays, 42 yards, 1:41; Boston College 27–24)
- (7:12) LOU – Nate Kurisky 6-yard pass from Tyler Shough (Brock Travelstead kick) (Drive: 4 plays, 63 yards, 1:51; Louisville 31–27)

Statistics	LOU	BC
First downs	24	14
Total yards	70–461	69–318
Rushing yards	32–129	41–154
Passing yards	332	164
Passing: Comp–Att–Int	28–38–2	13–28–0
Time of possession	30:09	29:51

Team	Category	Player	Statistics
Louisville	Passing	Tyler Shough	28/38, 332 yards, 2 TD, 2 INT
Louisville	Rushing	Isaac Brown	18 carries, 85 yards, 2 TD
Louisville	Receiving	Ja'Corey Brooks	8 receptions, 120 yards
Boston College	Passing	Thomas Castellanos	13/28, 164 yards, 3 TD
Boston College	Rushing	Treshaun Ward	13 carries, 64 yards
Boston College	Receiving	Treshaun Ward	3 receptions, 81 yards, TD

=== vs Syracuse ===
Syracuse Orange (6-2) at Boston College Eagles (4-4) – Game summary

Quarter	1	2	3	4	Total
Orange	0	14	7	10	31
Eagles	7	7	16	7	37

at Alumni Stadium • Chestnut Hill, Massachusetts

- Date: November 9th
- Game time: 12:00 p.m. EST/9:00 a.m. PST
- Game weather: Sunny, Temperature: 49 °F (9 °C)
- Game attendance: 44,500
- Referee: Stuart Mullins
- TV announcers (The CW): Thom Brennaman (play-by-play) and Max Browne (analyst)
- Box score, Recap

Game information

First quarter

- (2:43) BC – Kye Robichaux 34-yard run, Liam Connor kick (Drive: 3 plays, 42 yards, 1:24; Boston College 7–0)

Second quarter

- (8:44) BC – Lewis Bond 9-yard pass from Thomas Castellanos, Liam Connor kick (Drive: 6 plays, 53 yards, 3:02; Boston College 14–0)
- (6:32) SYR – Oronde Gadsden II 17-yard pass from Kyle McCord, Jackson Kennedy kick (Drive: 6 plays, 88 yards, 2:23; Boston College 14–7)
- (2:10) SYR – LeQuint Allen 3-yard run, Jackson Kennedy kick (Drive: 6 plays, 67 yards, 2:45; Tied 14–14)

Third quarter

- (8:36) SYR – LeQuint Allen 4-yard run, Jackson Kennedy kick (Drive: 8 plays, 59 yards, 4:17; Syracuse 21–14)
- (7:47) BC – Kye Robichaux 14-yard run, Liam Connor kick (Drive: 3 plays, 75 yards, 0:49; Tied 21–21)
- (7:33) BC – 0-yard safety (Boston College 23–21)
- (0:38) BC – Jordan McDonald 13-yard run, Liam Connor kick (Drive: 12 plays, 67 yards, 6:55; Boston College 30–21)

Fourth quarter

- (11:16) SYR – Darrell Gill Jr. 12-yard pass from Kyle McCord, Jackson Kennedy kick (Drive: 10 plays, 75 yards, 4:22; Boston College 30–28)
- (6:51) BC – Jeremiah Franklin 18-yard pass from Grayson James, Liam Connor kick (Drive: 10 plays, 78 yards, 4:25; Boston College 37–28)
- (1:16) SYR – Jackson Kennedy 25-yard field goal (Drive: 9 plays, 73 yards, 2:26; Boston College 37–31)

Statistics	SYR	BC
First downs	26	22
Total yards	431	378
Rushing yards	39	313
Passing yards	392	65
Passing: Comp–Att–Int	31-48-0	7-13-1
Time of possession	29:17	30:43

Team	Category	Player	Statistics
Syracuse	Passing	Kyle McCord	31/48, 392 yards, 2 TD
Syracuse	Rushing	LeQuint Allen	16 rushes, 51 yards, 2 TD
Syracuse	Receiving	Oronde Gadsden II	9 receptions, 114 yards, TD
Boston College	Passing	Grayson James	5/6, 51 yards, TD
Boston College	Rushing	Kye Robichaux	28 rushes, 198 yards, 2 TD
Boston College	Receiving	Lewis Bond	5 receptions, 42 yards, TD

=== at No. 14 SMU ===
Game Ten – Boston College Eagles (5–4) at No. 14 SMU Mustangs (8–1) – Game summary

Quarter	1	2	3	4	Total
Eagles	0	14	7	7	28
No. 14 Mustangs	10	10	11	7	38

at Gerald J. Ford Stadium, University Park, Texas

- Date: Saturday November 16, 2024
- Game time: 3:30 p.m. EST/12:30 p.m. PST
- Game weather: Sunny, 76 °F (24 °C)
- Game attendance: 34,438
- Referee: Nate Black
- TV announcers (ESPN): Bob Wischusen (play-by-play), Louis Riddick (analyst) and Kris Budden (sideline)

Game information

First quarter

- SMU – Roderick Daniels Jr. 15-yard pass from Kevin Jennings (Collin Rogers kick), 7:35. Mustangs 7–0. Drive: 6 plays, 57 yards, 2:16.
- SMU – Collin Rogers 35-yard field goal, 0:42. Mustangs 10–0. Drive: 8 plays, 33 yards, 3:09.

Second quarter

- BC – Kye Robichaux 2-yard run (Liam Conner kick), 9:49. Mustangs 10–7. Drive: 13 plays, 75 yards, 5:53.
- SMU – Brashard Smith 4-yard run (Collin Rogers kick), 5:53. Mustangs 17–7. Drive: 9 plays, 92 yards, 3:50.
- BC – Kamari Morales 13-yard pass from Grayson James (Liam Conner kick), 1:03. Mustangs 17–14. Drive: 12 plays, 75 yards, 4:50.
- SMU – Collin Rogers 41-yard field goal, 0:00. Mustangs 20–14. Drive: 4 plays, 56 yards, 0:24.

Third quarter

- BC – Grayson James 20-yard run (Liam Conner kick), 10:45. Eagles 21–20. Drive: 8 plays, 83 yards, 4:10.
- SMU – Jordan Hudson 38-yard pass from Kevin Jennings (Brashard Smith run), 8:52. Mustangs 28–21. Drive: 6 plays, 75 yards, 1:53.
- SMU – Collin Rogers 37-yard field goal, 4:02. Mustangs 31–21. Drive: 10 plays, 42 yards, 3:49.

Fourth quarter

- BC – Kye Robichaux 3-yard run (Liam Conner kick), 5:52. Mustangs 31–28. Drive: 10 plays, 74 yards, 5:59.
- SMU – Key'Shawn Smith 5-yard pass from Kevin Jennings (Collin Rogers kick), 0:08. Mustangs 38–28. Drive: 4 plays, 13 yards, 1:03.

Statistics	BC	SMU
First downs	23	25
Total yards	417	438
Rushing yards	180	140
Passing yards	237	298
Turnovers	1	1
Time of possession	35:09	24:51

Team	Category	Player	Statistics
Boston College	Passing	Grayson James	18/32, 237 yards, TD, INT
Boston College	Rushing	Kye Robichaux	21 carries, 90 yards, 2 TD
Boston College	Receiving	Reed Harris	4 receptions, 78 yards
SMU	Passing	Kevin Jennings	24/35, 298 yards, 3 TD, INT
SMU	Rushing	Brashard Smith	18 carries, 120 yards, TD
SMU	Receiving	Jordan Hudson	7 receptions, 99 yards, TD

=== vs North Carolina ===
North Carolina Tar Heels (6–4) at Boston College Eagles (5–5) – Game summary

Quarter	1	2	3	4	Total
Tar Heels	0	7	0	14	21
Eagles	3	21	3	14	41

at Alumni Stadium • Chestnut Hill, Massachusetts

- Date: November 23rd
- Game time: 12:00 p.m. EST/9:00 a.m. PST
- TV announcers (The CW): Evan Lepler (play-by-play), Steve Smith Sr. (analyst) and Carla Gebhart (sideline)

Game information

First quarter

Second quarter

Third quarter

Fourth quarter

Statistics	UNC	BC
First downs	13	24
Total yards	212	420
Rushing yards	36	228
Passing yards	176	192
Passing: Comp–Att–Int	16–30–3	18–27–0
Time of possession	22:12	37:48

Team	Category	Player	Statistics
North Carolina	Passing	Jacolby Criswell	16/30, 176 yards, 3 INT
North Carolina	Rushing	Omarion Hampton	11 carries, 53 yards
North Carolina	Receiving	John Copenhaver	4 receptions, 64 yards
Boston College	Passing	Grayson James	18/27, 192 yards, TD
Boston College	Rushing	Kye Robichaux	23 carries, 93 yards, TD
Boston College	Receiving	Lewis Bond	9 receptions, 81 yards

=== vs Pittsburgh ===
Pittsburgh Panthers (7–4) at Boston College Eagles (6–5) – Game summary

Quarter	1	2	3	4	Total
Panthers	0	10	7	6	23
Eagles	6	14	7	7	34

at Alumni Stadium • Chestnut Hill, Massachusetts

- Date: November 30th
- Game time: 3:00 p.m. EST
- Game attendance: 29,704
- TV announcers (The CW): Thom Brennaman (play-by-play), Max Browne (analyst) and Treavor Scales (sideline)

Game information

First quarter

- (1:53) BC – Jordan McDonald 36-yard run (2-point pass conversion failed) (Drive: 3 plays, 67 yards, 1:19; Boston College 6–0)

Second quarter

- (6:35) BC – Kye Robichaux 2-yard run (Liam Connor kick) (Drive: 3 plays, 56 yards, 1:32; Boston College 13–0)
- (3:56) PITT – Gavin Bartholomew 11-yard pass from Nate Yarnell (Ben Sauls kick) (Drive: 8 plays, 75 yards, 2:39; Boston College 13–7)
- (0:33) BC – Ty Clemons 55-yard interception return (Liam Connor kick) (Drive: 7 plays, 54 yards, 1:05; Boston College 20–7)
- (0:00) PITT – Ben Sauls 57-yard field goal (Drive: 3 plays, 6 yards, 0:33; Boston College 20–10)

Third quarter

- (7:50) PITT – Gavin Bartholomew 5-yard pass from Nate Yarnell (Ben Sauls kick) (Drive: 8 plays, 65 yards, 3:20; Boston College 20–17)
- (2:33) BC – Reed Harris 28-yard pass from Grayson James (Liam Connor kick) (Drive: 8 plays, 83 yards, 5:17; Boston College 27–17)

Fourth quarter

- (6:12) BC – Kamari Morales 15-yard pass from Grayson James (Liam Connor kick) (Drive: 8 plays, 39 yards, 4:57; Boston College 34–17)
- (12:32) PITT – Konata Mumpfield 15-yard pass from Nate Yarnell (2-point pass conversion failed) (Drive: 9 plays, 75 yards, 2:13; Boston College 34–23)

Statistics	PITT	BC
First downs	22	18
Total yards	322	381
Rushing yards	23	128
Passing yards	299	253
Passing: Comp–Att–Int	24–44–1	20–28–0
Time of possession	24:08	35:52

Team	Category	Player	Statistics
Pittsburgh	Passing	Nate Yarnell	23/42, 296 yards, 3 TD, INT
Pittsburgh	Rushing	Derrick Davis Jr.	5 carries, 21 yards
Pittsburgh	Receiving	Konata Mumpfield	8 receptions, 144 yards, TD
Boston College	Passing	Grayson James	20/28, 253 yards, 2 TD
Boston College	Rushing	Kye Robichaux	21 carries, 71 yards, TD
Boston College	Receiving	Reed Harris	3 receptions, 85 yards, TD

=== vs Nebraska (Pinstripe Bowl) ===
2024 Bad Boy Mowers Pinstripe Bowl
Boston College Eagles (7-5) vs. Nebraska Cornhuskers (6-6) – Game summary

Quarter	1	2	3	4	Total
Eagles	0	2	0	13	15
Cornhuskers	0	13	7	0	20

at Yankee Stadium • Bronx, New York

- Date: Saturday, December 28, 2024
- Game time: 12:00 p.m. EST
- Game weather: Cloudy • Temperature: 41 °F (5 °C) • Wind: 2 mph (3.2 km/h) west
- Game attendance: 30,062
- Referee: Daniel Gautreaux
- TV announcers (ABC): Mike Monaco (play-by-play), Kirk Morrison (analyst), and Dawn Davenport (sideline)

Game information

First quarter

- (14:56) NEB – Rahmir Johnson 4-yard run, John Hohl kick (Drive: 15 plays, 75 yards, 6:32; Nebraska 7–0)
- (3:39) NEB – Kwinten Ives 2-yard run, John Hohl kick (Drive: 7 plays, 67 yards, 2:46; Nebraska 13–0)
- (3:39) BC – Ashton McShane defensive PAT conversion (Drive: 7 plays, 67 yards, 2:46; Nebraska 13–2)

Second quarter

- No scoring.

Third quarter

- (3:02) NEB – Emmett Johnson 13-yard pass from Dylan Raiola, John Hohl kick (Drive: 7 plays, 50 yards, 3:12; Nebraska 20–2)

Fourth quarter

- (6:11) BC – Turbo Richard 1-yard run, 2-point pass conversion failed (Drive: 8 plays, 64 yards, 2:52; Nebraska 20–8)
- (4:18) BC – Jordan McDonald 2-yard run, Liam Connor kick (Drive: 1 plays, 2 yards, 0:04; Nebraska 20–15)

Statistics	BC	NEB
First downs	20	20
Total yards	348	363
Rushes/yards	26/47	29/127
Passing yards	301	236
Passing: Comp–Att–Int	26-41-0	24-32-1
Time of possession	28:44	31:16

Team	Category	Player	Statistics
Boston College	Passing	Grayson James	26-41, 301 yds
Boston College	Rushing	Grayson James	9 car, 22 yds
Boston College	Receiving	Lewis Bond	7 rec, 99 yds
Nebraska	Passing	Dylan Raiola	23-31, 228 yds, 1 TD, 1 INT
Nebraska	Rushing	Emmett Johnson	14 car, 68 yds
Nebraska	Receiving	Jahmal Banks	4 rec, 79 yds

== Rankings ==
Ranking movements Legend: ██ Increase in ranking ██ Decrease in ranking — = Not ranked RV = Received votes
	Week																
Poll	Pre	1	2	3	4	5	6	7	8	9	10	11	12	13	14	15	Final
AP	—	RV	24	RV	RV	RV	—	—	—	—	—	—	—	—	—	—	—
Coaches	—	RV	RV	RV	RV	RV	—	—	—	—	—	—	—	—	—	—	—
CFP	Not released										—	—	—	—	—	—	Not released
