= Anthony Colandrea =

American football player (born 2004)

No. 10 – Nebraska Cornhuskers
- Position: Quarterback
- Class: Senior

Personal information
- Born: October 16, 2004 (age 22)
- Listed height: 6 ft 0 in (1.83 m)
- Listed weight: 200 lb (91 kg)

Career information
- High school: Lakewood (Saint Petersburg, Florida)
- College: Virginia (2023–2024); UNLV (2025); Nebraska (2026–present)

Awards and highlights
- MW Offensive Player of the Year (2025); First-team All-Mountain West (2025)
- Stats at ESPN

Anthony Colandrea (born October 16, 2004) is an American college football quarterback for the Nebraska Cornhuskers. He previously played for the Virginia Cavaliers and UNLV Rebels.

== Early life ==
Colandrea attended Lakewood High School in Saint Petersburg, Florida, where he completed 508 of 812 pass attempts for 7,311 yards and 60 touchdowns to 24 interceptions. He also rushed for 1,021 yards and 11 touchdowns and hauled in four receptions for 68 yards. He committed to play college football at the University of Virginia.

== College career ==
=== Virginia ===
As a true freshman, Colandrea competed with quarterback Tony Muskett for the starting position during fall camp. Head coach Tony Elliott named Muskett the starter for the season opener against No. 12 Tennessee. Colandrea made his collegiate debut in the fourth quarter after Muskett suffered an injury in the 49–13 loss. The following week against James Madison, Colandrea made his first career start, completing 20 of 26 passes for 377 yards, two touchdowns, and one interception in a 36–35 loss. He threw a 63-yard touchdown pass to Malik Washington for his first collegiate touchdown and a 75-yard touchdown pass to Kobe Pace. He became the first true freshman quarterback to start a home opener for Virginia since 1977. For his performance, Colandrea was named the Atlantic Coast Conference (ACC) Rookie of the Week. Colandrea struggled in his next two starts against Maryland and NC State, throwing three touchdowns and five interceptions in the two losses before Muskett returned from injury. Colandrea did not appear in another game until Week 9 against Georgia Tech, when Muskett was injured on the first drive and Grady Brosterhous entered at quarterback. Colandrea later replaced Brosterhous on the same drive and finished the game, completing 21 of 37 passes for 200 yards, two touchdowns, and an interception in the 45–17 loss, effectively ending his chances of preserving his redshirt. He started the final three games of the season, beginning with No. 11 Louisville, where he completed 20 of 31 passes for 314 yards, one touchdown, and one interception while rushing for a season-high 89 yards in a 31–24 loss. In Week 11 against Duke, he earned his first career win as a starter, completing 21 of 30 passes for 278 yards and three touchdowns in a 30–27 victory and was named ACC Rookie of the Week for the second time. He started the season finale against Virginia Tech, completing 29 of 46 passes for 243 yards, two touchdowns, and an interception in the 55–17 loss. Colandrea appeared in eight games and made six starts, posting a 1–5 record as a starter. He completed 154 of 246 passes for 1,958 yards, 13 touchdowns, and nine interceptions while rushing for 225 yards and a touchdown.

Colandrea won the starting quarterback competition over Muskett during fall camp ahead of the 2024 season. In the season opener against Richmond, he completed 17 of 23 passes for 297 yards and two touchdowns while adding a rushing touchdown in a 34–13 victory. The following week against Wake Forest, he completed 33 of 43 passes for a then-career-high 357 yards, three touchdowns, and two interceptions in a 31–30 victory, overcoming a 30–17 fourth-quarter deficit. Despite opening the season 4–1, Virginia and Colandrea struggled down the stretch. In Week 10 against No. 8 Notre Dame, Colandrea threw three interceptions in the first half before being replaced by Muskett in the second half of the 35–14 loss. Following a Week 11 loss to No. 13 SMU, Colandrea was benched for the season finale against rival Virginia Tech. Virginia lost the game, finishing 5–7 and failing to become bowl eligible. On the season, Colandrea appeared in and started 11 games, completing 198 of 320 passes for 2,125 yards, 13 touchdowns, and 11 interceptions while rushing for 277 yards and two touchdowns. On December 1, 2024, Colandrea announced his intention to enter the NCAA transfer portal.

=== UNLV ===
On December 22, 2024, Colandrea transferred to UNLV. Colandrea competed with fellow Michigan transfer Alex Orji for the starting quarterback position. Head coach Dan Mullen said both quarterbacks would play in the 2025 season opener against Idaho State. Orji took the opening snap and played the first offensive series, while Colandrea started the game at wide receiver. Following an Orji fumble and a 10–0 deficit, Colandrea took over at quarterback and led the Rebels to a 38–31 victory, completing 15 of 21 passes for 195 yards and a touchdown while rushing for a season-high 93 yards. He was subsequently named the starting quarterback against Sam Houston. In his first start at quarterback, he completed 19 of 23 passes for 249 yards, two touchdowns, and an interception while rushing for a touchdown in a 38–21 victory. The following week, he led the Rebels to a 30–23 upset victory over UCLA, passing for 203 yards and three touchdowns. The victory was UNLV's first over a Big Ten opponent since 2003. In Week 4, he led a game-winning field goal drive against Miami (OH), overcoming a 38–24 fourth-quarter deficit. After opening the season 6–0, its first such start since 1974, UNLV lost consecutive games to Boise State and New Mexico. In the loss to New Mexico, Colandrea threw for a career-high 382 yards and three touchdowns. In Week 11 against Hawaii, he threw for 253 yards and three touchdowns in a 38–10 victory, marking the seventh time he threw at least two touchdown passes in a game during the season. Following a season-finale victory over Nevada, UNLV finished the regular season in a four-way tie for first place. The conference used tiebreaking metrics to determine its championship-game participants, with UNLV and Boise State advancing to the 2025 Mountain West Conference Football Championship Game. Against Boise State, Colandrea completed 18 of 38 passes for 225 yards and a touchdown while rushing for a touchdown in a 38–21 loss. In the 2025 Frisco Bowl against Ohio, he completed 19 of 30 passes for 184 yards and an interception while rushing for a touchdown in a 17–10 loss. Colandrea appeared in and started all 14 games, including one start at wide receiver. He completed 275 of 417 passes for 3,459 yards, 23 touchdowns, and nine interceptions while rushing for 649 yards and 10 touchdowns. His 4,108 total offensive yards set a UNLV program record. For his performance, Colandrea was named Mountain West Offensive Player of the Year and a first-team All-Mountain West selection. He was also named Mountain West Offensive Player of the Week four times during the season. On December 26, 2025, Colandrea announced that he would enter the transfer portal for the second time.

=== Nebraska ===
On January 6, 2026, a day after Kenny Minchey flipped his commitment from Nebraska to Kentucky, Colandrea transferred to Nebraska. Colandrea competed with TJ Lateef for the starting quarterback position, with head coach Matt Rhule naming Colandrea the starter ahead of the season. He made his Nebraska debut in the 2026 season opener against Ohio, completing 18 of 32 passes for 275 yards and three touchdowns while rushing for a touchdown in a 49–21 victory. The following week against Bowling Green, Colandrea completed 20 of 24 passes for 222 yards and four touchdowns with one interception in a 56–7 victory. He was subsequently named Big Ten Offensive Player of the Week.

=== Statistics ===
Year	Team	Games			Passing								Rushing			
Year	Team	GP	GS	Record (Note: Accounts for only GS as a QB. On 8/23/25 Colandrea started at WR.)	Cmp	Att	Pct	Yds	Y/A	TD	Int	Rtg	Att	Yds	Avg	TD
2023	Virginia	8	6	1−5	154	246	62.6	1,958	8.0	13	9	139.6	73	225	3.1	0
2024	Virginia	11	11	5−6	198	320	61.9	2,125	6.6	13	11	124.2	128	277	2.2	2
2025	UNLV	14	14	9−4	275	417	65.9	3,459	8.3	23	9	149.5	127	649	5.1	10
2026	Nebraska	9	9	5−4	193	306	63.1	2,109	6.9	16	7	133.6	84	381	4.5	4
Career		42	40	20−19	820	1,289	63.6	9,651	7.5	65	36	137.6	412	1,532	3.7	16
