= Tony Elliott (American football coach) =

American football player and coach (born 1979)

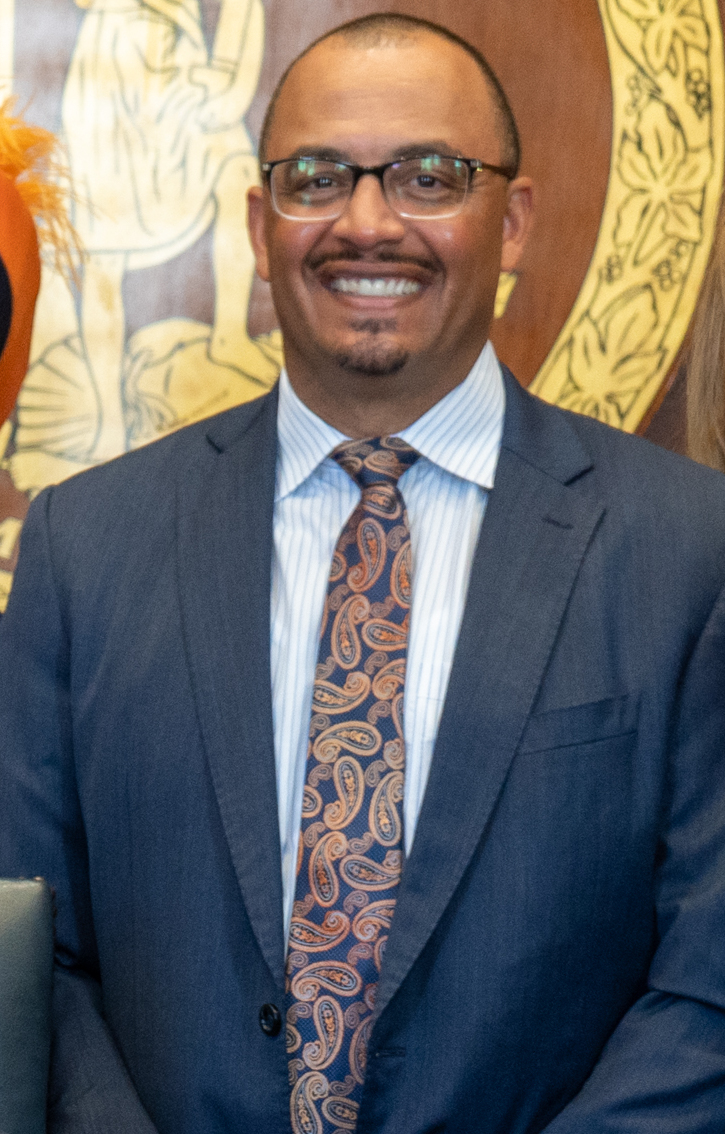
- Elliott in 2024

Current position
- Title: Head coach
- Team: Virginia
- Conference: ACC
- Record: 28–31

Biographical details
- Born: November 26, 1979 (age 46); Watsonville, California, U.S.

Playing career
- 2000–2003: Clemson
- Position: Wide receiver

Coaching career (HC unless noted)
- 2006–2007: South Carolina State (WR)
- 2008–2010: Furman (WR)
- 2011–2014: Clemson (RB)
- 2015–2019: Clemson (co-OC/RB)
- 2020: Clemson (OC/RB)
- 2021: Clemson (AHC/OC/TE)
- 2022–present: Virginia

Head coaching record
- Overall: 28–31 (.475)
- Bowls: 1–0 (1.000)

Accomplishments and honors

Championships
- As an offensive coordinator: 2× CFP national champion (2016, 2018)

Awards
- Broyles Award (2017); ACC Coach of the Year (2025)

Antonio Elliott (born November 26, 1979) is an American college football coach who is currently the head coach at the University of Virginia. He previously served as an assistant coach at Clemson University from 2011 to 2021, most recently as associate head coach, offensive coordinator, and tight ends coach, after serving most of those years as running backs coach and/or co-offensive coordinator.

Elliott played college football at Clemson as a wide receiver from 2000 to 2003. Prior to his tenure at Virginia, he held various assistant coaching positions at South Carolina State, Furman and Clemson. While at Clemson, he won the 2017 Broyles Award, which goes to the college game's top assistant. He was one of the highest paid coordinators in the sport during his time at Clemson, and there he recruited, coached, and called plays for the ACC's all-time leader in yards and touchdowns, Travis Etienne, and coordinated the offenses of Deshaun Watson and Trevor Lawrence. Elliott-coached offenses (in part) won two NCAA titles for Clemson, including an upset 44–16 victory over No. 1 Alabama for the national championship in January 2019.

Elliott was named the ACC Coach of the Year and a finalist for the Paul "Bear" Bryant Coach of the Year award by the American Heart Association after leading Virginia to its winningest season in history in 2025.

== Early life ==
Elliott spent portions of his early childhood homeless on the streets of Los Angeles, California with his mother and sister. When he was 9 years old, his mother was killed in a car accident and he was sent to live with an aunt and uncle in South Carolina, where he began playing football and basketball.

== Playing career ==
Elliott graduated from James Island High School in Charleston in 1997, where he was a football and basketball star for the Trojans. After attending the United States Air Force Academy Preparatory School as a football recruit in 1997, Elliott played college football at Clemson University under head coach Tommy Bowden. He came to Clemson in the fall of 1999 as a walk-on wide receiver. He was selected team captain in 2003, a rare accomplishment for a walk-on. He finished his career at Clemson with 4 letters and 44 games with 4 starts. Elliott won All-ACC academic honors as a student athlete.

== Coaching career ==
=== Early career ===
Elliott started his coaching career as the wide receivers' coach for the South Carolina State Bulldogs in 2006. He then served in the same position for the Furman Paladins from 2008 to 2010.

=== Clemson ===
Elliott made his return to the Clemson Tigers in early 2011 to fill the running back coach position. In December 2014, he was named co-offensive coordinator to replace outgoing offensive coordinator Chad Morris, who left to take over as head coach of the SMU football program. He shared coordinator duties with Clemson's wide receivers coach, Jeff Scott. Head coach Dabo Swinney announced that Elliott would be the play-caller for the 2014 Russell Athletic Bowl versus the Oklahoma Sooners, in which the Tigers defeated the Sooners by a score of 40-6.

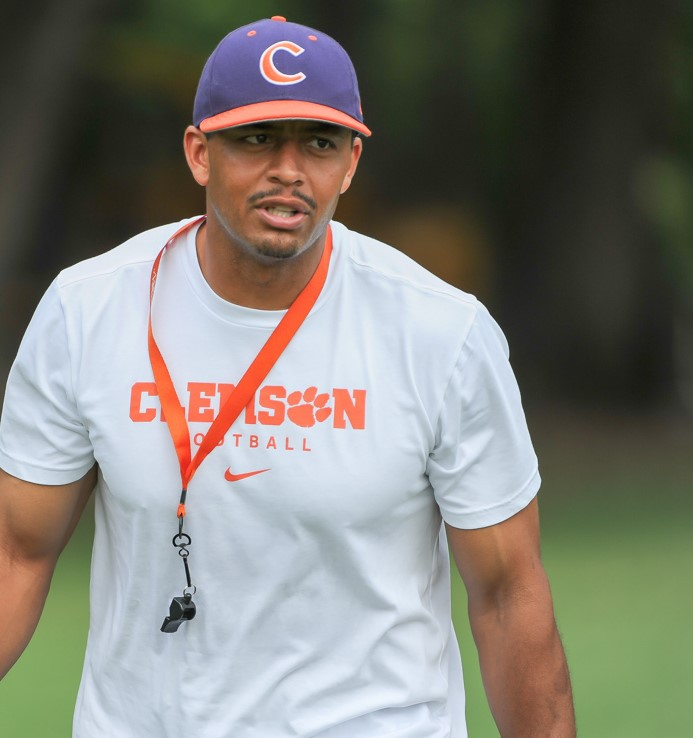
Elliott with Clemson in 2015

Clemson's football team won the national championship in January 2017, beating Alabama, with Scott calling the offensive plays and serving as co-offensive coordinator for the game. In December 2017, Elliott was the recipient of the Broyles Award, presented to the top assistant coach in college football. In 2019, Elliott again called plays as co-offensive coordinator for Clemson's 44–16 win, again over Nick Saban's Alabama, to secure a second national championship.

Elliott was Clemson's primary offensive playcaller for seven seasons (2015–2021), including through both of Clemson's NCAA Championships and successful runs through the College Football Playoff. Elliott also coached the running backs and tight ends at Clemson. Elliott was the primary Clemson recruiter for these positions, including a "diamond in the rough" in four-star Travis Etienne, who under Elliott's position coaching and offensive playcalling, became the ACC's all-time leader in rushing yards, rushing touchdowns, total touchdowns, total points scored, and total yards gained. Under Elliott, Etienne scored at least one touchdown in 46 of his 55 career games, setting the NCAA and FBS records. As a coordinator, Elliott was also the primary playcaller for Trevor Lawrence.

Elliott gained the additional title of associate head coach for Clemson in 2021. During his seven years as sole or co-offensive coordinator for Clemson, the Tigers had a record of 88–10. After reportedly turning down Tennessee's head coaching job the previous year, Elliott decided he was ready for such a role after the 2021 season, being named as the leading candidate at Duke before interviewing twice in Charlottesville after Bronco Mendenhall had stepped down for personal reasons at Virginia... a program that was briefly rumored to favor one of its own (Penn State co-defensive coordinator Anthony Poindexter) for the spot. Elliott had been the primary offensive playcaller and co-coordinator on the opposite side of the field from his new team in the 2019 ACC Championship Game, a game his Tigers had won, 62–17, over the Cavaliers.

=== Virginia ===
In December 2021, Elliott was named the 41st head coach at the University of Virginia, replacing Bronco Mendenhall.

Elliott set to work by hiring John Rudzinski from the United States Air Force Academy as his defensive coordinator, and Desmond Kitchings from the Atlanta Falcons as his offensive coordinator. Rudzinski's 2020 defense had ranked in the top 5 nationally for scoring defense and his 2021 defense had ranked in the national top 5 for total defense. Kitchings had previously been co-offensive coordinator at both NC State and Vanderbilt before most recently being a running backs coach in the NFL.

Elliott led the Virginia program to its first 11-win season in school history after defeating Missouri of the SEC in the 2025 Gator Bowl, 13–7, with the Rudzinski defense shutting the Tigers out for the final 56 minutes of the game. Elliott has improved UVA's conference record in each of his first four years at the school, winning 1, 2, 3, and seven ACC games respectively in those years. His 2025 UVA team finished first in conference play at 7–1 in a rejuvenated ACC that went 9–4 in its bowl games. Elliott was named ACC Coach of the Year and a finalist for Paul "Bear" Bryant Coach of the Year by the American Heart Association.

== Personal life ==
Elliott graduated with a bachelor's degree in industrial engineering from Clemson University in 2002 with a team-high 3.55 GPA. Upon graduation, he worked as an engineer for Michelin North America for two years. He is married to the former Tamika Whitner of Spartanburg, South Carolina.

== Head coaching record ==
Year	Team	Overall	Conference	Standing	Bowl/playoffs	Coaches^{#}	AP^{°}
Virginia Cavaliers (Atlantic Coast Conference) (2022–present)
2022	Virginia	3–7	1–6	T–6th (Coastal)			
2023	Virginia	3–9	2–6	T–11th			
2024	Virginia	5–7	3–5	T–10th			
2025	Virginia	11–3	7–1	1st	W Gator	16	16
2026	Virginia	6–5	4–4				
Virginia:		28–31	17–22				
Total:		28–31					
