= Malachi Fields =

American football player (born 2003)

No. 88 – New York Giants
- Position: Wide receiver
- Roster status: Active

Personal information
- Born: August 26, 2003 (age 23); Charlottesville, Virginia, U.S.
- Listed height: 6 ft 4 in (1.93 m)
- Listed weight: 218 lb (99 kg)

Career information
- High school: Monticello (Charlottesville)
- College: Virginia (2021–2024); Notre Dame (2025)
- NFL draft: 2026: 3rd round, 74th overall pick

Career history
- New York Giants (2026–present)

Awards and highlights
- Third-team All-ACC (2024)

Career NFL statistics as of Week 10, 2026
- Receptions: 22
- Receiving yards: 350
- Receiving touchdowns: 1
- Stats at Pro Football Reference

Steven Malachi Fields (born August 26, 2003) is an American professional football wide receiver for the New York Giants of the National Football League (NFL). He played college football for the Virginia Cavaliers and Notre Dame Fighting Irish and was selected by the Giants in the third round of the 2026 NFL draft.

== Early life and high school career ==
Fields was born August 26, 2003 in Charlottesville, Virginia. He attended Monticello High School in Charlottesville where he played quarterback and was a state champion in track and field; however, he was offered by colleges as a wide receiver. He committed to play college football at the University of Virginia over offers from Liberty, VMI, and William & Mary.

== College career ==
=== Virginia ===
As a freshman, Fields made an immediate impact, earning praise from then-Virginia head coach Bronco Mendenhall following a 35-yard performance against Wake Forest. He finished his freshman season by recording 11 receptions for 172 yards before undergoing surgery to repair a broken metatarsal in his left foot, missing significant time during his sophomore season. In his only appearance during his sophomore year against Pittsburgh, Fields caught his first career touchdown in addition to five receptions for 58 yards. As a junior, Fields emerged as one of the top wide receivers statistically in the conference. Fields, along with teammate Malik Washington, combined to become the only two receivers to both record 800 yards in the conference. At the conclusion of his junior season, he was named a semifinalist for the Comeback Player of the Year Award after tallying 811 yards on 58 receptions for five touchdowns. As a senior, Fields recorded 55 receptions for 808 yards and five touchdowns, before entering the transfer portal.

=== Notre Dame ===
On December 23, 2024, Fields announced his decision to transfer to the University of Notre Dame to play for the Notre Dame Fighting Irish.

=== Statistics ===
Year	Team	GP	Receiving			
Year	Team	GP	Rec	Yards	Avg	TD
2021	Virginia	11	11	172	15.6	0
2022	Virginia	1	5	58	11.6	1
2023	Virginia	12	58	811	14.0	5
2024	Virginia	12	55	808	14.7	5
2025	Notre Dame	12	36	630	17.5	5
Career		48	165	2,479	15.0	16

== Professional career ==
Pre-draft measurables
Height	Weight	Arm length	Hand span	Wingspan	40-yard dash	10-yard split	20-yard split	20-yard shuttle	Three-cone drill	Vertical jump	Broad jump	Bench press
6 ft 4 1/2 in (1.94 m)	218 lb (99 kg)	32 1/8 in (0.82 m)	9 in (0.23 m)	6 ft 7 in (2.01 m)	4.61 s	1.63 s	2.71 s	4.35 s	6.98 s	38.0 in (0.97 m)	10 ft 4 in (3.15 m)	15 reps
All values from NFL Combine/Pro Day

=== New York Giants (2026-Present) ===
Fields was selected in the third round, 74th overall, of the 2026 NFL draft by the New York Giants. The Giants received the selection from the Cleveland Browns in exchange for the 105th and 145th picks, as well as a 2027 fourth round pick.
