= Tony Muskett =

American football player

No. 11
- Position: Quarterback

Personal information
- Born: 2002 (age 23–24)
- Listed height: 6 ft 1 in (1.85 m)
- Listed weight: 213 lb (97 kg)

Career information
- High school: West Springfield(Fairfax County, Virginia)
- College: Monmouth (2020–2022); Virginia (2023–2024)

Awards and highlights
- First-team All-Big South (2020, 2021); Big South Offensive Freshman of the Year (2020)
- Stats at ESPN

Tony Muskett (born c. 2002) is an American former college football quarterback who played for the Monmouth Hawks and Virginia Cavaliers.

== Early life ==
Muskett grew up in Springfield, Virginia, and attended and played high school football for West Springfield High School in Fairfax County, Virginia. In four years, he threw for over 7,000 yards and a total of 69 touchdowns. He also earned First Team All-Conference and All-Region selections. He committed to play college football for Monmouth on July 4, 2019.

== College career ==
=== Monmouth ===
Muskett began his college football career with Monmouth, joining the team during the 2020–21 COVID-19 season. As a true freshman he started all four of the team's games. He made his debut against Charleston Southern as he went eighteen of 26 for 297 yards and two touchdowns. Against Big South opponents Gardner–Webb and No. 7 Kennesaw State he threw two touchdowns against the Bulldogs and a career-high four touchdowns against the Owls. He earned two Big South Freshman of the Week after the games against Charleston Southern and Kennesaw State. After the team's final regular season game against Robert Morris was canceled they earned a bid ranked No. 10 to play against No. 4 Sam Houston in the playoffs. After not throwing a single interception all season he threw two in a failed comeback effort to the Bearkats. He finished the game with a tied career-high 297 passing yards alongside a single touchdown pass. Following the season he earned First Team All-Big South, 2020–21 Big South Offensive Freshman of the Year, and HERO Sports Freshman All-America honoree honors. He also finished fifth in voting for the Jerry Rice Award.

In 2021, Muskett's sophomore season, he started all eleven games for the Hawks. He led the team to a 7–4 while going 6–1 in conference play. After losing the season-opener against FBS opponent Middle Tennessee he led the team past Fordham while going 30 of 44 for 268 yards, one touchdown, and one interception. After beating Charleston Southern 41–14 they'd lose to Holy Cross 15–45. On homecoming night against Gardner–Webb he went 18 of 31 for 289 yards and four touchdowns in the team's 54–17 win. After losing a close 28–31 game against No. 24 Princeton he led the team to four-straight wins. In that span he threw for thirteen touchdowns including four against North Alabama and Robert Morris. In the four game stretch the team outscored opponents 158 to 73. Muskett and the Hawks could not beat Big South champion and No. 5 Kennesaw State in the season-finale as they lost 17–49. Following the season he earned his second-straight First Team All-Big South selection and also made HERO sports All-American Sophomore team.

In 2022, he started the first eight games for the team before missing the final three games with a knee injury. The team transitioned into the Colonial Athletic Association (CAA) for the 2022 season and he was named as a CAA Preseason All-Conference selection. In the team's CAA debut in conference play the Hawks fell to New Hampshire 21–31. Against Fordham he threw for a season-high 323 yards and two touchdowns despite the 49–52 loss. Following a 45–6 win over Georgetown he led the Hawks past No. 10 Villanova 49–42. In the upset win he threw for 161 yards on 11 of 17 passing and an additional three touchdown passes. Against Lehigh he threw for three touchdown passes while winning 35–7. On the ground he also ran for 56 yards and another touchdown. In a game that went to 7 overtimes against No. 19 Rhode Island he threw for 249 yards and three touchdowns. He would not play the final three games against Towson, No. 16 Delaware and Stony Brook. Following the season he announced his intent to transfer from the team.

=== Virginia ===
On December 11, 2022, Muskett transferred to Virginia.

=== Statistics ===
| Season | Games | | | Passing | | | | | | | | Rushing | | | | |
| Season | GP | GS | Record | Comp | Att | Pct | Yards | Avg | TD | Int | Rate | Att | Yards | Avg | TD | |
|---|---|---|---|---|---|---|---|---|---|---|---|---|---|---|---|---|
| 2020 | Monmouth | 4 | 4 | 3–1 | 80 | 128 | 62.5 | 1,039 | 8.1 | 9 | 2 | 150.8 | 27 | -13 | -0.5 | 0 |
| 2021 | Monmouth | 11 | 11 | 7–4 | 239 | 367 | 65.1 | 2,651 | 7.2 | 25 | 6 | 145.0 | 70 | -41 | -0.7 | 4 |
| 2022 | Monmouth | 8 | 8 | 4–4 | 143 | 223 | 64.1 | 1,997 | 9.0 | 17 | 8 | 157.3 | 65 | 210 | 3.2 | 1 |
| 2023 | Virginia | 6 | 6 | 2–4 | 93 | 147 | 63.3 | 1,031 | 7.0 | 6 | 5 | 128.8 | 61 | 66 | 1.1 | 1 |
| 2024 | Virginia | 8 | 1 | 0−1 | 45 | 76 | 59.2 | 545 | 7.2 | 3 | 3 | 124.6 | 27 | 98 | 3.6 | 4 |
| Career | | 37 | 30 | 16−14 | 600 | 941 | 63.8 | 7,263 | 7.7 | 60 | 24 | 144.5 | 253 | 313 | 1.2 | 10 |

== Professional career ==
Pre-draft measurables
| Height | Weight |
|---|---|
| 6 ft 1 1/4 in (1.86 m) | 213 lb (97 kg) |
Values from Pro Day
