= Jahmeer Carter =

American football player (born 2002)

Profile
- Position: Defensive tackle

Personal information
- Born: November 13, 2001 (age 24)
- Listed height: 6 ft 2 in (1.88 m)
- Listed weight: 311 lb (141 kg)

Career information
- High school: Archbishop Spalding (Severn, Maryland)
- College: Virginia (2020–2025)
- NFL draft: 2026: undrafted

Career history
- Los Angeles Chargers (2026)*
- * Offseason or practice squad member only

Jahmeer Carter (born October 10, 2002) is an American professional football defensive tackle. He played college football for the Virginia Cavaliers.

== Early life ==
Carter attended Archbishop Spalding High School in Severn, Maryland. He committed to play college football for the Virginia Cavaliers.

== College career ==
As a freshman in 2020, Carter racked up 14 tackles. In 2021, he recorded 23 tackles with two going for a loss, and a pass deflection. In 2022, Carter totaled 29 tackles with one going for a loss, and a fumble recovery. In the 2023 season, he notched 35 tackles with two being for a loss, and a sack. During the 2024 season, Carter started in all 12 games, totaling 33 tackles. In the 2025 season, he played in all 14 games, notching 30 tackles with one going for a loss. After the season, Carter declared for the NFL draft.

== Professional career ==
After going unselected in the 2026 NFL draft, Carter signed with the Los Angeles Chargers as an undrafted free agent. Carter was waived by the Chargers as a part of final roster cuts on August 30, 2026; he was re-signed to the team's practice squad the following day. Carter was released by Los Angeles on September 2.
