= McKale Boley =

American football player (born 2003)

No. 52 – Virginia Cavaliers
- Position: Offensive tackle
- Class: Senior

Personal information
- Born: October 18, 2003 (age 23); Hattiesburg, Mississippi, U.S.
- Listed height: 6 ft 5 in (1.96 m)
- Listed weight: 316 lb (143 kg)

Career information
- High school: Oak Grove (Hattiesburg)
- College: Virginia (2022–present)

Awards and highlights
- Third-team All-ACC (2025)
- Stats at ESPN

McKale Boley (born October 18, 2003) is an American college football offensive tackle for the Virginia Cavaliers.

== Early life ==
Boley attended Oak Grove High School in Hattiesburg, Mississippi. He originally committed to play college football for the Colorado Buffaloes. However, a few months later, Boley re-opened his recruitment. He later committed and signed to play for the Virginia Cavaliers.

== College career ==
As a freshman, Boley was named the team's starting left tackle for their season opener against Richmond. He played in six total games that season, with two starts. In 2023, Boley started all 12 games for the Cavaliers at left tackle. In 2024, he missed the first four games of the season due to a knee injury he suffered during training camp. After returning from injury, Boley started the team's final eight games.

== Personal life ==
Boley is the son of former NFL linebacker, Michael Boley.
