= John Rudzinski =

American college football coach

Current position
- Title: Defensive coordinator
- Team: Virginia
- Conference: ACC

Biographical details
- Born: Green Bay, Wisconsin, US
- Education: Air Force

Playing career
- 2002–2005: Air Force
- Position: Linebacker

Coaching career (HC unless noted)
- 2005–2006: Air Force (GA)
- 2007–2009: First Baptist School (South Carolina) (DA)
- 2010–2011: Air Force (DA)
- 2012–2013: Air Force (OLB/RC)
- 2014: Air Force (DB/RC)
- 2015–2017: Air Force (DB)
- 2018–2021: Air Force (DC/DB)
- 2022–present: Virginia (DC/DB)

John Rudzinski is an American football coach and former player. He currently serves as the defensive coordinator at Virginia. He had spent his previous coaching career with Air Force, dating back to 2005. Upon graduation from the United States Air Force Academy, he became a 2nd lieutenant in the United States Air Force.

In the 2020 season at his alma mater, Rudzinski's Falcon defense ranked 3rd nationwide in scoring defense at 15.0 points allowed. In the 2021 season, Rudzinski's Falcon defense ranked 4th nationally in total defense, with an average of just 296 yards allowed. Rudzinski's defenses are foundationally built to stop the run, and are superb at preventing rushing yards. His defenses have on at least two occasions ranked in the national top 10 for run defense.

== Playing career ==
After graduating from Notre Dame Academy in Green Bay, Wisconsin, Rudzinski played linebacker for the Air Force Falcons from 2002 to 2005. He was a three-year letterman, and was the team leader in tackles during that three-year span. He was a captain during his final two years on the team, and was an all-Mountain West honorable mention as a senior. He participated in the 2006 East–West Shrine Game following his senior season.

== Coaching career ==
Rudzinski joined the coaching staff at Air Force immediately following his graduation in 2005, holding a graduate assistant position for two years. He then transitioned to Charleston Air Force Base in North Charleston, South Carolina, where he served as a maintenance operations officer from 2007 to 2010. During that time, he served as a defensive assistant at First Baptist School in Charleston. Since returning to Air Force in 2010, Rudzinski has served as a defensive assistant, recruiting coordinator, outside linebackers coach, and defensive backs coach. He was promoted to defensive coordinator halfway through the 2018 season following Steve Russ's departure for the Carolina Panthers.

== Personal life ==
Rudzinski is originally from Green Bay, Wisconsin and graduated from Notre Dame Academy in 2001. He has a wife, Lauren, and they have five children.
