= Desmond Kitchings =

American football player and coach (born 1978)

Virginia Cavaliers
- Title: Offensive coordinator

Personal information
- Born: July 19, 1978 (age 48); Columbia, South Carolina, U.S.

Career information
- Position: Wide receiver
- High school: Wagener-Salley (SC)
- College: Furman (1996–1999)
- NFL draft: 2000: 7th round, 207th overall pick

Career history

Playing
- Kansas City Chiefs (2000)*; New York Jets (2000); Indianapolis Colts (2001); St. Louis Rams (2003)
- * Offseason or practice squad member only

Coaching
- Furman (2004–2007) Tight ends coach & special teams coordinator; Vanderbilt (2008–2010); Running backs coach & special teams coordinator (2008–2009); Co-offensive coordinator & running backs coach (2010); Air Force (2011) Running backs coach; NC State (2012–2019); Running backs coach & tight ends coach (2012); Running backs coach (2013–2015); Assistant head coach & running backs coach (2016–2018); Co-offensive coordinator & running backs coach (2019); South Carolina (2020) Running backs coach; Atlanta Falcons (2021) Running backs coach; Virginia (2022–present) Offensive coordinator & tight ends coach

Desmond "Des" Kitchings (born July 19, 1978) is an American football coach and former wide receiver who is currently the offensive coordinator for the Virginia Cavaliers.

== Playing career ==
Kitchings played as a receiver/return specialist at Furman University. He averaged 29.3 yards per kick return and set a school record of four kick returns for touchdowns. Kitchings was selected by the Kansas City Chiefs in the 2000 NFL draft, but never played in the pro leagues.

== Coaching career ==
Kitchings began his coaching career at Furman, working as the tight ends coach and special teams coordinator from 2004 to 2007. He then spent 3 seasons coaching at Vanderbilt serving one of them as the offensive coordinator. After spending 2011 at Air Force, he went on to coach 8 seasons at NC State. In 2020 he served as the running backs coach for South Carolina. In 2021 he was named the running backs coach for the Atlanta Falcons. After week 17 of Kitching's first year with the Falcons, it was announced that he would become the offensive coordinator for the Virginia Cavaliers.
