= Malik Washington =

American football player (born 2001)

No. 6 – Miami Dolphins
- Positions: Wide receiver, return specialist
- Roster status: Active

Personal information
- Born: October 20, 2000 (age 26); Lawrenceville, Georgia, U.S.
- Listed height: 5 ft 8 in (1.73 m)
- Listed weight: 192 lb (87 kg)

Career information
- High school: Parkview (Lilburn, Georgia)
- College: Northwestern (2019–2022); Virginia (2023)
- NFL draft: 2024: 6th round, 184th overall pick

Career history
- Miami Dolphins (2024–present)

Awards and highlights
- NCAA receptions leader (2023); First-team All-ACC (2023)

Career NFL statistics as of 2025
- Receptions: 72
- Receiving yards: 540
- Receiving touchdowns: 3
- Rushing yards: 135
- Rushing average: 6.1
- Rushing touchdowns: 2
- Return yards: 1,789
- Return touchdowns: 1
- Stats at Pro Football Reference

Malik Washington (born October 20, 2000) is an American professional football wide receiver and return specialist for the Miami Dolphins of the National Football League (NFL). He played college football for the Northwestern Wildcats and Virginia Cavaliers.

== Early life ==
Washington was born in Lawrenceville, Georgia and attended Parkview High School, where he hauled in 130 receptions for 1,958 yards and 12 touchdowns, while also rushing for 687 yards and 16 touchdowns. He also played quarterback, completing 17 of 27 pass attempts for 149 yards and four touchdowns with one interception. On defense, Washington tallied 117 tackles with 2.5 tackles for loss, nine pass deflections, eight interceptions, two fumble recoveries, and a forced fumble. He committed to play college football at Northwestern University over other programs such as Michigan State and Tennessee.

== College career ==
=== Northwestern ===
As a freshman in 2019, Washington had six receptions for 25 yards. In the COVID shortened 2020 season, he brought in five passes for 51 yards, while also rushing for eight yards. In week seven of the 2021 season, Washington hauled in five receptions for 84 yards and a touchdown in a win over Rutgers. In week three of the 2022 season, he notched four receptions for 76 yards and a touchdown in a 31-24 loss to Southern Illinois. Washington totaled 65 receptions for 694 yards and a touchdown, while also adding 16 yards on the ground, earning third-team all-Big Ten Conference from Pro Football Focus. After the season, he entered the NCAA transfer portal.

=== Virginia ===
Washington transferred to the University of Virginia to continue his collegiate career. In week two of the 2023 season, versus James Madison, he brought in five passes for 119 yards and a touchdown, and in week three against Maryland he notched nine receptions for 141 yards. In week four, Washington had a career performance, totaling ten catches for 170 yards and two touchdowns, but the Cavaliers would fall to NC State. He was named the Atlantic Coast Conference (ACC) wide receiver of the week. Washington finished the season with 110 receptions for 1,426 yards, both single season records for the Cavaliers, and nine touchdowns. His 110 receptions led the nation.

== Professional career ==
Pre-draft measurables
Height	Weight	Arm length	Hand span	Wingspan	40-yard dash	10-yard split	20-yard split	20-yard shuttle	Three-cone drill	Vertical jump	Broad jump	Bench press
5 ft 8 1/2 in (1.74 m)	191 lb (87 kg)	30 3/8 in (0.77 m)	9 1/4 in (0.23 m)	6 ft 0 7/8 in (1.85 m)	4.47 s	1.53 s	2.61 s	4.26 s	6.87 s	42.5 in (1.08 m)	10 ft 6 in (3.20 m)	19 reps
All values from NFL Combine/Pro Day

Washington was selected by the Miami Dolphins in the sixth round (184th overall) of the 2024 NFL draft. He made 14 appearances (three starts) for the Dolphins during his rookie campaign, recording 26 receptions for 223 yards.

Washington began the 2025 season as one of Miami's auxiliary receivers, as well as the team's primary punt returner. In Week 2 against the New England Patriots, Washington returned a Bryce Baringer punt 74 yards for a touchdown, the first of his career.

2026-

Malik Washington Has found himself as Malik Willis’s (QB) Favorite Target. Washington Punched in his first score of the year on a 2 Yard Touchdown Vs The Patriots (L 24-19). Washington Has emerged as the second option to Caleb Douglas (R)

== NFL career statistics ==
Legend
**Bold**	Career high

=== Regular season ===
Year	Team	Games		Receiving					Rushing					Punt returns					Kick returns					Fumbles	
Year	Team	GP	GS	Rec	Yds	Avg	Lng	TD	Att	Yds	Avg	Lng	TD	Ret	Yds	Avg	Lng	TD	Ret	Yds	Avg	Lng	TD	Fum	Lost
2024	MIA	14	3	26	223	**8.6**	20	0	5	25	5.0	**18**	**1**	18	134	7.4	19	0	14	430	**30.7**	**67**	0	**1**	**1**
2025	MIA	17	6	**46**	**317**	6.9	**28**	**3**	**17**	**110**	**6.5**	**18**	**1**	**20**	**260**	**13.0**	**74**	**1**	**36**	**965**	26.8	47	0	**1**	**1**
Career		31	9	72	540	7.5	28	3	22	135	6.1	18	2	38	394	10.4	74	1	50	1395	27.9	67	0	2	2
