= 2025 Atlantic Coast Conference football season =

Sports season

2025 ACC Football season
- League: NCAA Division I Football Bowl Subdivision
- Sport: Football
- Duration: August 23 to November 29, 2025
- Teams: 17

2026 NFL draft
- Top draft pick: Francis Mauigoa, OT, Miami
- Picked by: New York Giants, 10th overall

Regular season
- Season champions: Virginia
- Runners-up: Duke

ACC Championship Game
- Date: December 6, 2025
- Venue: Bank of America Stadium, Charlotte, North Carolina
- Champions: Duke
- Runners-up: Virginia

Seasons
- ← 2024 2026 →

2025 Atlantic Coast Conference football standings
	Conf.			Overall
Team	W		L	W		L
No. 16 Virginia y	7	–	1	11	–	3
Duke y$	6	–	2	9	–	5
No. 2 Miami (FL) ^	6	–	2	13	–	3
Georgia Tech	6	–	2	9	–	4
SMU	6	–	2	9	–	4
Pittsburgh	6	–	2	8	–	5
Louisville	4	–	4	9	–	4
Wake Forest	4	–	4	9	–	4
NC State	4	–	4	8	–	5
California	4	–	4	7	–	6
Clemson	4	–	4	7	–	6
Stanford	3	–	5	4	–	8
Florida State	2	–	6	5	–	7
Virginia Tech	2	–	6	3	–	9
North Carolina	2	–	6	4	–	8
Boston College	1	–	7	2	–	10
Syracuse	1	–	7	3	–	9
Championship: Duke 27, Virginia 20^{OT}
^ – College Football Playoff participant; $ – Conference champion; y – Championship game participant; As of October 24, 2026; Rankings from AP Poll

The 2025 Atlantic Coast Conference football season, part of the 2025 NCAA Division I FBS football season, was the 73rd season of college football play for the Atlantic Coast Conference (ACC). The entire schedule was released on January 27, 2025.

The SMU Mustangs were the defending regular season champions and the Clemson Tigers were the defending champions.

== Preseason ==
=== Recruiting classes ===
National rankings
Team	ESPN	Rivals	24/7	On3 Recruits	Total signees
Boston College	55	54	59	59	27
California	56	65	70	56	18
Clemson	37	32	26	23	15
Duke	34	31	30	34	27
Florida State	39	17	19	20	23
Georgia Tech	31	23	21	24	25
Louisville	24	66	68	68	16
Miami (FL)	11	13	14	14	21
North Carolina	45	41	26	43	27
NC State	42	39	34	36	23
Pittsburgh	46	48	51	54	22
Stanford	68	59	56	57	17
SMU	14	28	31	31	23
Syracuse	36	38	42	50	35
Virginia	52	58	58	60	19
Virginia Tech	46	36	40	38	20
Wake Forest	56	59	63	62	22

Note: ESPN only ranks the top 75 teams.

=== ACC Kickoff ===
The 2025 ACC Kickoff was held from July 22 through 24 at the Hilton Charlotte Uptown in Charlotte, North Carolina. Coverage of the three day event was televised by the ACC Network. The event was reduced from four days to three days in 2025.

The schedule for the teams is as follows:

Date	Team
July 22	California
July 22	Miami (FL)
July 22	SMU
July 22	Stanford
July 22	Virginia

Date	Team
July 23	Florida State
July 23	Georgia Tech
July 23	Louisville
July 23	Pittsburgh
July 23	Syracuse
July 23	Wake Forest

Date	Team
July 24	Boston College
July 24	Clemson
July 24	Duke
July 24	North Carolina
July 24	NC State
July 24	Virginia Tech

==== Preseason media polls ====
On July 30, 2025, the league released the preseason poll as voted on by 183 media members during ACC Kickoff.

Predicted finish	Team	Votes (1st place)
1	Clemson	3,083 (167)
2	Miami (FL)	2,679 (7)
3	SMU	2,612 (2)
4	Georgia Tech	2,397 (2)
5	Louisville	2,370
6	Duke	1,973
7	Florida State	1,920 (4)
8	North Carolina	1,611
9	Pittsburgh	1,571
10	NC State	1,505
11	Virginia Tech	1,412 (1)
12	Syracuse	1,381
13	Boston College	953
14	Virginia	871
15	California	659
16	Wake Forest	576
17	Stanford	426

=== Preseason ACC Player of the year ===
Ranking	Player	Position	Team	Votes
1	Cade Klubnik	QB	Clemson	146
2	Haynes King	QB	Georgia Tech	9
3	Kevin Jennings	QB	SMU	5
4	Carson Beck	QB	Miami (FL)	4
4	Kyron Drones	QB	Virginia Tech	4
6	Isaac Brown	RB	Louisville	3
7	Quintayvious Hutchins	DE	Boston College	2
7	CJ Bailey	QB	NC State	2
7	Eli Holstein	QB	Pittsburgh	2
7	Kyle Louis	LB	Pittsburgh	2
7	Desmond Reid	RB	Pittsburgh	2
12	Lewis Bond	WR	Boston College	1
12	Jamal Haynes	RB	Georgia Tech	1

=== Preseason all-conference teams ===
==== Offense ====
Position	Player	School	Votes
Quarterback	Cade Klubnik	Clemson	148
Running back	Isaac Brown	Louisville	99
Running back	Jamal Haynes	Georgia Tech	85
Wide receiver	Antonio Williams	Clemson	143
Wide receiver	Bryant Wesco	Clemson	66
Wide receiver	Chris Bell	Louisville	51
Tight end	Justin Joly	NC State	92
All-Purpose	Desmond Reid	Pittsburgh	73
Tackle	Francis Mauigoa	Miami (FL)	99
Tackle	Blake Miller	Clemson	99
Guard	Keylan Rutledge	Georgia Tech	93
Guard	Walker Parks	Clemson	51
Center	Ryan Linthicum	Clemson	44

==== Defense ====
Position	Player	School	Votes
Defensive end	T.J. Parker	Clemson	152
Defensive end	Rueben Bain Jr.	Miami (FL)	92
Defensive tackle	Peter Woods	Clemson	142
Defensive tackle	Darrell Jackson Jr.	Florida State	56
Linebacker	Kyle Louis	Pittsburgh	98
Linebacker	Wade Woodaz	Clemson	77
Linebacker	Sammy Brown	Clemson	76
Cornerback	Avieon Terrell	Clemson	129
Cornerback	Chandler Rivers	Duke	106
Safety	Isaiah Nwokobia	SMU	86
Safety	Terry Moore	Duke	81

==== Specialist ====
Position	Player	School	Votes
Placekicker	Collin Rogers	SMU	67
Punter	Jack Stonehouse	Syracuse	70
Specialist	Desmond Reid	Pittsburgh	68

=== Preseason awards ===
==== All–American Teams ====
	AP 1st Team	AP 2nd Team	AS 1st Team	AS 2nd Team	AS 3rd Team	AS 4th Team	WCFF 1st Team	WCFF 2nd Team	ESPN 1st Team	ESPN 2nd Team	CBS 1st Team	CBS 2nd Team	SN 1st Team	SN 2nd Team	USAT 1st Team	USAT 2nd Team
Rueben Bain Jr., DE, Miami (FL)				✓										✓		
Rasheem Biles, LB, Pittsburgh						✓										
Isaac Brown, RB, Louisville		✓		✓				✓		✓		✓	✓			✓
Justin Joly, TE, NC State					✓			✓								
Cade Klubnik, QB, Clemson	✓			✓			✓		✓		✓			✓	✓	
Kyle Louis, LB, Pittsburgh	✓		✓				✓		✓		✓		✓		✓	
Francis Mauigoa, OL, Miami (FL)		✓	✓				✓			✓	✓		✓			✓
Keelan Marion, KR, Miami (FL)			✓				✓					✓	✓		✓	
Blake Miller, OL, Clemson		✓			✓											
Terry Moore, S, Duke						✓										
Isaiah Nwokobia, S, SMU					✓			✓						✓		
Brian Parker, OL, Duke						✓										
T.J. Parker, DE, Clemson		✓	✓					✓	✓			✓	✓		✓	
Desmond Reid, AP, Pittsburgh	✓		✓						✓		✓		✓		✓	
Chandler Rivers, CB, Duke		✓		✓						✓		✓		✓		
Eric Rivers, WR, Georgia Tech														✓		
Collin Rogers, K, SMU						✓										
Keylan Rutledge, OG, Georgia Tech		✓														✓
Avieon Terrell, CB, Clemson					✓					✓		✓				✓
Wade Woodaz, LB, Clemson						✓										
Peter Woods, DT, Clemson	✓		✓				✓		✓		✓		✓		✓	
Bryant Wesco, WR, Clemson					✓											
Antonio Williams, WR, Clemson		✓		✓						✓				✓		✓

==== Preseason award watchlists ====
Award	Head Coach/Player	School	Position	Year	Ref
Lott Trophy	Rueben Bain Jr.	Miami (FL)	DE	Jr.	
Lott Trophy	Kyle Louis	Pittsburgh	LB	(redshirt) Jr.	
Lott Trophy	T. J. Parker	Clemson	DE	Jr.	
Lott Trophy	Chandler Rivers	Duke	CB	Sr.	
Lott Trophy	Peter Woods	Clemson	DT	Jr.	
Dodd Trophy	Dabo Swinney	Clemson	HC		
Dodd Trophy	Brent Key	Georgia Tech	HC		
Dodd Trophy	Jeff Brohm	Louisville	HC		
Dodd Trophy	Mario Cristobal	Miami (FL)	HC		
Maxwell Award	Cade Klubnik	Clemson	QB	Sr.	
Maxwell Award	Antonio Williams	Clemson	WR	(redshirt) Jr.	
Maxwell Award	Darian Mensah	Duke	QB	So.	
Maxwell Award	Thomas Castellanos	Florida State	QB	Sr.	
Maxwell Award	Haynes King	Georgia Tech	QB	Sr.	
Maxwell Award	Jamal Haynes	Georgia Tech	RB	(redshirt) Sr.	
Maxwell Award	Miller Moss	Louisville	QB	Sr.	
Maxwell Award	Isaac Brown	Louisville	RB	So.	
Maxwell Award	Carson Beck	Miami (FL)	QB	(redshirt) Sr.	
Maxwell Award	CJ Bailey	NC State	QB	So.	
Maxwell Award	Eli Holstein	Pittsburgh	QB	(redshirt) So.	
Maxwell Award	Desmond Reid	Pittsburgh	RB	Sr.	
Maxwell Award	Kevin Jennings	SMU	QB	(redshirt) Jr.	
Maxwell Award	Chandler Morris	Virginia	QB	(redshirt) Sr.	
Maxwell Award	Kyron Drones	Virginia Tech	QB	(redshirt) Sr.	
Maxwell Award	Terion Stewart	Virginia Tech	RB	Sr.	
Maxwell Award	Demond Claiborne	Wake Forest	RB	Sr.	
Davey O'Brien Award	Cade Klubnik	Clemson	QB	Sr.	
Davey O'Brien Award	Darian Mensah	Duke	QB	So.	
Davey O'Brien Award	Haynes King	Georgia Tech	QB	Sr.	
Davey O'Brien Award	Miller Moss	Louisville	QB	Sr.	
Davey O'Brien Award	Carson Beck	Miami (FL)	QB	(redshirt) Sr.	
Davey O'Brien Award	Kevin Jennings	SMU	QB	(redshirt) Jr.	
Davey O'Brien Award	Chandler Morris	Virginia	QB	(redshirt) Sr.	
Doak Walker Award	Alex Broome	Boston College	RB	So.	
Doak Walker Award	Jordan McDonald	Boston College	RB	Sr.	
Doak Walker Award	Jaquez Moore	Duke	RB	Sr.	
Doak Walker Award	Gavin Sawchuk	Florida State	RB	Jr.	
Doak Walker Award	Jamal Haynes	Georgia Tech	RB	(redshirt) Sr.	
Doak Walker Award	Isaac Brown	Louisville	RB	So.	
Doak Walker Award	Duke Watson	Louisville	RB	So.	
Doak Walker Award	Davion Gause	North Carolina	RB	So.	
Doak Walker Award	Hollywood Smothers	NC State	RB	So.	
Doak Walker Award	Desmond Reid	Pittsburgh	RB	Sr.	
Doak Walker Award	Derrick McFall	SMU	RB	Fr.	
Doak Walker Award	Sedrick Irvin	Stanford	RB	Jr.	
Doak Walker Award	Will Nixon	Syracuse	RB	Sr.	
Doak Walker Award	Yasin Willis	Syracuse	RB	So.	
Doak Walker Award	Xavier Brown	Virginia	RB	Jr.	
Doak Walker Award	Terion Stewart	Virginia Tech	RB	GS	
Doak Walker Award	Demond Claiborne	Wake Forest	RB	Sr.	
Biletnikoff Award	Bryant Wesco	Clemson	WR	So.	
Biletnikoff Award	Antonio Williams	Clemson	WR	(redshirt) Jr.	
Biletnikoff Award	Eric Rivers	Georgia Tech	WR	(redshirt) Sr.	
Biletnikoff Award	Chris Bell	Louisville	WR	Sr.	
Biletnikoff Award	Justin Joly	NC State	TE	Sr.	
John Mackey Award	Jeremiah Franklin	Boston College	TE	Sr.	
John Mackey Award	Randy Pittman Jr.	Florida State	TE	Jr.	
John Mackey Award	Landen Thomas	Florida State	TE	So.	
John Mackey Award	Elija Lofton	Miami (FL)	TE	So.	
John Mackey Award	Justin Joly	NC State	TE	Sr.	
John Mackey Award	Matthew Hibner	SMU	TE	GS	
John Mackey Award	RJ Maryland	SMU	TE	Sr.	
John Mackey Award	Sam Roush	Stanford	TE	Sr.	
John Mackey Award	Benji Gosnell	Virginia Tech	TE	(redshirt) Jr.	
Rimington Trophy	Ryan Linthicum	Clemson	C	GS	
Rimington Trophy	Matt Craycraft	Duke	C	(redshirt) So.	
Rimington Trophy	Luke Petitbon	Florida State	C	(redshirt) Sr.	
Rimington Trophy	Pete Nygra	Louisville	C	(redshirt) Jr.	
Rimington Trophy	James Brockermeyer	Miami (FL)	C	(redshirt) Sr.	
Rimington Trophy	Austin Blaske	North Carolina	C	(redshirt) Sr.	
Rimington Trophy	Lyndon Cooper	Pittsburgh	C	(redshirt) Sr.	
Rimington Trophy	Addison Nichols	SMU	C	(redshirt) Jr.	
Rimington Trophy	Brady Wilson	Virginia Tech	C	GS	

Award	Head Coach/Player	School	Position	Year	Ref
Butkus Award	Sammy Brown	Clemson	LB	So.	
Butkus Award	Wade Woodaz	Clemson	LB	Sr.	
Butkus Award	Stanquan Clark	Louisville	LB	Jr.	
Butkus Award	Wesley Bissainthe	Miami (FL)	LB	Sr.	
Butkus Award	Andrew Simpson	North Carolina	LB	(redshirt) Sr.	
Butkus Award	Rasheem Biles	Pittsburgh	LB	Jr.	
Butkus Award	Kyle Louis	Pittsburgh	LB	(redshirt) Jr.	
Butkus Award	Caleb Woodson	Virginia Tech	LB	Jr.	
Jim Thorpe Award	Avieon Terrell	Clemson	CB	Jr.	
Jim Thorpe Award	Terry Moore	Duke	S	Sr.	
Jim Thorpe Award	Chandler Rivers	Duke	CB	Sr.	
Jim Thorpe Award	Isaiah Nwokobia	SMU	S	Sr.	
Bronko Nagurski Trophy	T. J. Parker	Clemson	DE	Jr.	
Bronko Nagurski Trophy	Avieon Terrell	Clemson	CB	Jr.	
Bronko Nagurski Trophy	Peter Woods	Clemson	DT	Jr.	
Bronko Nagurski Trophy	Chandler Rivers	Duke	CB	Sr.	
Bronko Nagurski Trophy	Rueben Bain Jr.	Miami (FL)	DE	Jr.	
Bronko Nagurski Trophy	Kyle Louis	Pittsburgh	LB	(redshirt) Jr.	
Bronko Nagurski Trophy	Isaiah Nwokobia	SMU	S	(redshirt) Sr.	
Outland Trophy	Blake Miller	Clemson	OT	Jr.	
Outland Trophy	Peter Woods	Clemson	DT	Jr.	
Outland Trophy	Brian Parker II	Duke	OT	(redshirt) Jr.	
Outland Trophy	Keylan Rutledge	Georgia Tech	G	Sr.	
Outland Trophy	Anez Cooper	Miami (FL)	G	Sr.	
Outland Trophy	Francis Mauigoa	Miami (FL)	OT	Jr.	
Outland Trophy	P. J. Williams	SMU	OT	(redshirt) So.	
Lou Groza Award	Nolan Hauser	Clemson	K	So.	
Lou Groza Award	Collin Rogers	SMU	K	Sr.	
Lou Groza Award	John Love	Virginia Tech	K	Jr.	
Ray Guy Award	Jack Stonehouse	Syracuse	P	(redshirt) Jr.	
Paul Hornung Award	Jacob De Jesus	California	WR	Sr.	
Paul Hornung Award	Antonio Williams	Clemson	WR	(redshirt) Jr.	
Paul Hornung Award	Peyton Jones	Duke	RB	Jr.	
Paul Hornung Award	Isaac Brown	Louisville	RB	So.	
Paul Hornung Award	Keelan Marion	Miami (FL)	WR	(redshirt) Sr.	
Paul Hornung Award	Hollywood Smothers	NC State	RB	(redshirt) So.	
Paul Hornung Award	Kenny Johnson	Pittsburgh	WR	Jr.	
Paul Hornung Award	Demond Claiborne	Wake Forest	RB	Sr.	
Wuerffel Trophy	Alex Broome	Boston College	RB	(redshirt) Jr.	
Wuerffel Trophy	Jeffery Johnson	California	TE	(redshirt) Sr.	
Wuerffel Trophy	Adam Randall	Clemson	RB	GS	
Wuerffel Trophy	Chandler Rivers	Duke	CB	Sr.	
Wuerffel Trophy	Richie Leonard IV	Florida State	OL	(redshirt) Sr.	
Wuerffel Trophy	Haynes King	Georgia Tech	QB	(redshirt) Sr.	
Wuerffel Trophy	Clev Lubin	Louisville	DL	(redshirt) Sr.	
Wuerffel Trophy	Francis Mauigoa	Miami (FL)	OT	Jr.	
Wuerffel Trophy	Will Hardy	North Carolina	DB	GS	
Wuerffel Trophy	Brandon Cleveland	NC State	DT	Sr.	
Wuerffel Trophy	Eli Holstein	Pittsburgh	QB	(redshirt) So.	
Wuerffel Trophy	Alexander Kilgore	SMU	LB	Jr.	
Wuerffel Trophy	Sam Roush	Stanford	TE	Sr.	
Wuerffel Trophy	Derek McDonald	Syracuse	LB	(redshirt) Sr.	
Wuerffel Trophy	Stevie Bracey	Virginia	LB	Sr.	
Wuerffel Trophy	Tyson Flowers	Virginia Tech	DB	(redshirt) Jr.	
Wuerffel Trophy	Zamari Stevenson	Wake Forest	DB	(redshirt) Jr.	
Walter Camp Award	Cade Klubnik	Clemson	QB	Sr.	
Walter Camp Award	Peter Woods	Clemson	DT	Jr.	
Walter Camp Award	Jamal Haynes	Georgia Tech	RB	(redshirt) Sr.	
Walter Camp Award	Isaac Brown	Louisville	RB	So.	
Walter Camp Award	Carson Beck	Miami (FL)	QB	(redshirt) Sr.	
Walter Camp Award	Kyle Louis	Pittsburgh	LB	(redshirt) Jr.	
Walter Camp Award	Demond Claiborne	Wake Forest	RB	Sr.	
Jet Award	Keelan Marion	Miami (FL)	WR	(redshirt) Sr.	
Jet Award	Chris Culliver	North Carolina	WR	So.	
Jet Award	Kenny Johnson	Pittsburgh	WR	Jr.	
Patrick Mannelly Award	Ben Mann	Boston College	LS	(redshirt) Sr.	
Patrick Mannelly Award	Curtis Cooper	Duke	LS	GS	
Patrick Mannelly Award	Mason Arnold	Florida State	LS	(redshirt) Sr.	
Patrick Mannelly Award	Shai Kochav	Louisville	LS	(redshirt) Sr.	
Patrick Mannelly Award	Adam Booker	Miami (FL)	LS	Jr.	
Patrick Mannelly Award	Spencer Triplett	North Carolina	LS	(redshirt) Sr.	
Patrick Mannelly Award	Bryce Robinson	Virginia	LS	GS	
Patrick Mannelly Award	Christian Epling	Virginia Tech	LS	(redshirt) Jr.	

Award	Head Coach/Player	School	Position	Year	Ref
Bednarik Award	Cade Uluave	California	LB	Jr.	
Bednarik Award	T. J. Parker	Clemson	DE	Jr.	
Bednarik Award	Avieon Terrell	Clemson	CB	Jr.	
Bednarik Award	Peter Woods	Clemson	DT	Jr.	
Bednarik Award	Terry Moore	Duke	S	Sr.	
Bednarik Award	Chandler Rivers	Duke	CB	Sr.	
Bednarik Award	Darrell Jackson Jr.	Florida State	DT	Sr.	
Bednarik Award	Kyle Efford	Georgia Tech	LB	Jr.	
Bednarik Award	Rueben Bain Jr.	Miami (FL)	DE	Jr.	
Bednarik Award	OJ Frederique Jr.	Miami (FL)	CB	So.	
Bednarik Award	Sean Brown	NC State	LB	Sr.	
Bednarik Award	Caden Fordham	NC State	LB	Sr.	
Bednarik Award	Rasheem Biles	Pittsburgh	LB	Jr.	
Bednarik Award	Kyle Louis	Pittsburgh	LB	Jr.	
Bednarik Award	Isaiah Nwokobia	SMU	S	Sr.	
Rotary Lombardi Award	Sammy Brown	Clemson	LB	So.	
Rotary Lombardi Award	Blake Miller	Clemson	OT	Sr.	
Rotary Lombardi Award	T. J. Parker	Clemson	DE	Jr.	
Rotary Lombardi Award	Peter Woods	Clemson	DT	Jr.	
Rotary Lombardi Award	Brian Parker II	Duke	OT	(redshirt) Jr.	
Rotary Lombardi Award	Keylan Rutledge	Georgia Tech	OG	Sr.	
Rotary Lombardi Award	Rueben Bain Jr.	Miami (FL)	DE	Jr.	
Rotary Lombardi Award	Francis Mauigoa	Miami (FL)	OT	Jr.	
Rotary Lombardi Award	Kyle Louis	Pittsburgh	LB	(redshirt) Jr.	
Polynesian Football Player of the Year Award	Aidan Keanaaina	California	DT	(redshirt) Sr.	
Polynesian Football Player of the Year Award	Jordan Spasojevic-Moko	California	OG	(redshirt) Sr.	
Polynesian Football Player of the Year Award	Cade Uluave	California	LB	Jr.	
Polynesian Football Player of the Year Award	Sioape Vatikani	California	OG	(redshirt) Jr.	
Polynesian Football Player of the Year Award	Francis Mauigoa	Miami (FL)	OT	Jr.	
Polynesian Football Player of the Year Award	Keith Gouveia	Pittsburgh	OG	(redshirt) Sr.	
Polynesian Football Player of the Year Award	Simione Pale	Stanford	OG	Jr.	
Polynesian Football Player of the Year Award	Tevarua Tafiti	Stanford	LB	Sr.	
Polynesian Football Player of the Year Award	Dallas Afalava	Wake Forest	DT	Jr.	
Polynesian Football Player of the Year Award	Fa'alili Fa'amoe	Wake Forest	OT	(redshirt) Sr.	
Manning Award	Cade Klubnik	Clemson	QB	Sr.	
Manning Award	Haynes King	Georgia Tech	QB	Sr.	
Manning Award	CJ Bailey	NC State	QB	So.	
Manning Award	Kevin Jennings	SMU	QB	(redshirt) Jr.	
Johnny Unitas Golden Arm Award	Grayson James	Boston College	QB	(redshirt) Sr.	
Johnny Unitas Golden Arm Award	Cade Klubnik	Clemson	QB	Sr.	
Johnny Unitas Golden Arm Award	Darian Mensah	Duke	QB	So.	
Johnny Unitas Golden Arm Award	Thomas Castellanos	Florida State	QB	Sr.	
Johnny Unitas Golden Arm Award	Haynes King	Georgia Tech	QB	Sr.	
Johnny Unitas Golden Arm Award	Miller Moss	Louisville	QB	Sr.	
Johnny Unitas Golden Arm Award	Carson Beck	Miami (FL)	QB	(redshirt) Sr.	
Johnny Unitas Golden Arm Award	Eli Holstein	Pittsburgh	QB	(redshirt) So.	
Johnny Unitas Golden Arm Award	Kevin Jennings	SMU	QB	(redshirt) Jr.	
Johnny Unitas Golden Arm Award	Chandler Morris	Virginia	QB	(redshirt) Sr.	
Johnny Unitas Golden Arm Award	Kyron Drones	Virginia Tech	QB	(redshirt) Sr.	
Johnny Unitas Golden Arm Award	Robby Ashford	Wake Forest	QB	(redshirt) Sr.	
Earl Campbell Tyler Rose Award	Grayson James	Boston College	QB	(redshirt) Sr.	
Earl Campbell Tyler Rose Award	Brandon High Jr.	California	RB	So.	
Earl Campbell Tyler Rose Award	LJ Johnson	California	RB	Sr.	
Earl Campbell Tyler Rose Award	Jamaal Wiley	California	RB	Jr.	
Earl Campbell Tyler Rose Award	Cade Klubnik	Clemson	QB	Sr.	
Earl Campbell Tyler Rose Award	Matt Craycraft	Duke	C	Sr.	
Earl Campbell Tyler Rose Award	Haynes King	Georgia Tech	QB	Sr.	
Earl Campbell Tyler Rose Award	Chad Lindberg	North Carolina	OL	Sr.	
Earl Campbell Tyler Rose Award	Kevin Jennings	SMU	QB	(redshirt) Jr.	
Earl Campbell Tyler Rose Award	Johntay Cook II	Syracuse	WR	Jr.	
Earl Campbell Tyler Rose Award	Chandler Morris	Virginia	QB	(redshirt) Sr.	
Earl Campbell Tyler Rose Award	Kyron Drones	Virginia Tech	QB	(redshirt) Sr.	

== Head coaches ==
=== Pre-season changes ===
- In November 2024, prior to the season ending, the North Carolina Tar Heels fired head coach Mack Brown. On December 11, 2024, Bill Belichick was announced as Brown's replacement.
- On December 16, 2024, Dave Clawson resigned as head coach of the Wake Forest Demon Deacons. Jake Dickert was hired as his replacement on December 18, 2024.
- On March 25, 2025, the Stanford Cardinal fired head coach Troy Taylor amid an investigation into bullying behavior. On March 31, 2025, Frank Reich was hired as interim head coach.

=== Head coaching records ===
Team	Head coach	Years at school	Overall record	Record at school	ACC record
Boston College	Bill O'Brien	2	22–15	7–6	4–4
California	Justin Wilcox	9	42–50	42–50	2–6
Clemson	Dabo Swinney	17	180–47	180–47	109–24
Duke	Manny Diaz	2	30–19	9–4	21–12
Florida State	Mike Norvell	6	71–42	33–27	20–20
Georgia Tech	Brent Key	3	18–16	18–16	14–9
Louisville	Jeff Brohm	3	85–52	19–8	12–4
Miami (FL)	Mario Cristobal	4	84–76	22–16	12–12
North Carolina	Bill Belichick	1	0–0	0–0	0–0
NC State	Dave Doeren	13	110–69	87–65	47–51
Pittsburgh	Pat Narduzzi	11	72–56	72–56	46–36
SMU	Rhett Lashlee	4	29–12	29–12	8–0
Stanford	Frank Reich	1	0–0	0–0	0–0
Syracuse	Fran Brown	2	10–3	10–3	5–3
Virginia	Tony Elliott	4	11–23	11–23	6–17
Virginia Tech	Brent Pry	4	16–21	16–21	10–13
Wake Forest	Jake Dickert	1	23–20	0–0	0–0

Notes:

- Years at school includes 2025 season.
- Coaches shown are the coaches who began the 2025 season as head coach of each team.

== Rankings ==
Legend
	Improvement in ranking
	Drop in ranking
	Not ranked previous week
RV	Received votes but were not ranked in Top 25 of poll
т	Tied with team above or below also with this symbol

		Pre	Wk 1	Wk 2	Wk 3	Wk 4	Wk 5	Wk 6	Wk 7	Wk 8	Wk 9	Wk 10	Wk 11	Wk 12	Wk 13	Wk 14	Wk 15	Final
Boston College	AP	—	—	—	—	—	—	—	—	—	—	—	—	—	—	—	—	—
Boston College	C	—	—	—	—	—	—	—	—	—	—	—	—	—	—	—	—	—
Boston College	CFP	Not released										—	—	—	—	—	—	
California	AP	—	—	—	—	—	—	—	—	—	—	—	—	—	—	—	—	—
California	C	—	—	—	RV	—	—	—	—	—	—	—	—	—	—	—	—	—
California	CFP	Not released										—	—	—	—	—	—	
Clemson	AP	4 (4)	8	12	RV	—	—	—	—	—	—	—	—	—	—	—	—	—
Clemson	C	6 (2)	8	11	RV	—	—	—	RV	—	—	—	—	—	—	—	—	—
Clemson	CFP	Not released										—	—	—	—	—	—	
Duke	AP	RV	RV	—	—	—	—	—	—	—	—	—	—	—	—	—	RV	RV
Duke	C	RV	RV	—	—	—	RV	RV	RV	—	—	—	—	—	—	—	RV	RV
Duke	CFP	Not released										—	—	—	—	—	—	
Florida State	AP	RV	14	10	7	8	18	25	—	—	—	—	—	—	—	—	—	—
Florida State	C	RV	19	12	9	8	19	RV	—	—	—	—	—	—	—	—	—	—
Florida State	CFP	Not released										—	—	—	—	—	—	
Georgia Tech	AP	RV	RV	RV	18	16	17	13	12	7	8	16	14	15	23	24	24	RV
Georgia Tech	C	RV	RV	RV	19	17	16	13	12	7	7	14	12	12	19	23	22	24
Georgia Tech	CFP	Not released										17	16	16	23	22	22	
Louisville	AP	RV	RV	RV	RV	RV	RV	RV	—	19	16	14	19	RV	—	RV	RV	RV
Louisville	C	RV	RV	RV	RV	RV	RV	RV	RV	22	17	15	21	RV	—	RV	RV	RV
Louisville	CFP	Not released										15	20	—	—	—	—	
Miami (FL)	AP	10	5	5	4 (3)	2 (7)	3 (4)	2 (21)	2 (13)	9	10	18	16	14	13	12	10	2
Miami (FL)	C	10	7	6	6	6 (1)	3 (1)	3 (3)	2 (2)	9	9	18	16	15	13	13	10	2
Miami (FL)	CFP	Not released										18	15	13	12	12	10	
North Carolina	AP	—	—	—	—	—	—	—	—	—	—	—	—	—	—	—	—	—
North Carolina	C	—	—	—	—	—	—	—	—	—	—	—	—	—	—	—	—	—
North Carolina	CFP	Not released										—	—	—	—	—	—	
NC State	AP	—	—	—	RV	—	—	—	—	—	—	—	—	—	—	—	—	—
NC State	C	—	—	RV	RV	—	—	—	—	—	—	—	—	—	—	—	—	—
NC State	CFP	Not released										—	—	—	—	—	—	
Pittsburgh	AP	RV	RV	RV	—	—	—	—	—	—	RV	RV	23	RV	24	RV	RV	—
Pittsburgh	C	—	—	RV	—	—	—	—	RV	RV	RV	RV	23	RV	24	RV	RV	RV
Pittsburgh	CFP	Not released										24	22	—	22	—	—	
SMU	AP	16	17	RV	RV	—	—	—	—	—	—	RV	RV	RV	25	RV	RV	RV
SMU	C	16	16	RV	RV	—	—	RV	—	RV	—	RV	RV	RV	25	RV	RV	RV
SMU	CFP	Not released										—	—	—	21	—	—	
Stanford	AP	—	—	—	—	—	—	—	—	—	—	—	—	—	—	—	—	—
Stanford	C	—	—	—	—	—	—	—	—	—	—	—	—	—	—	—	—	—
Stanford	CFP	Not released										—	—	—	—	—	—	
Syracuse	AP	—	—	—	—	—	—	—	—	—	—	—	—	—	—	—	—	—
Syracuse	C	RV	—	—	—	RV	—	—	—	—	—	—	—	—	—	—	—	—
Syracuse	CFP	Not released										—	—	—	—	—	—	
Virginia	AP	—	RV	—	—	—	24	19	18	16	15	12	20	19	17	16	20	16
Virginia	C	—	—	—	—	—	RV	24	19	16	15	11	19	19	17	16	21	16
Virginia	CFP	Not released										14	19	19	18	17	19	
Virginia Tech	AP	—	—	—	—	—	—	—	—	—	—	—	—	—	—	—	—	—
Virginia Tech	C	—	—	—	—	—	—	—	—	—	—	—	—	—	—	—	—	—
Virginia Tech	CFP	Not released										—	—	—	—	—	—	
Wake Forest	AP	—	—	—	—	—	—	—	—	—	—	—	—	—	RV	—	—	—
Wake Forest	C	—	—	—	—	—	—	—	—	—	RV	—	—	—	—	—	—	RV
Wake Forest	CFP	Not released										—	—	—	—	—	—	

== Schedule ==
The schedule was released on January 27, 2025. The season began on August 29, 2025, but Stanford opened one week early in Week 0. The regular season ended with the ACC Championship Game on December 6, 2025.

=== Regular season ===
==== Week Zero ====
Date	Time	Visiting team	Home team	Site	TV	Result	Attendance	Ref.
August 23	7:30 p.m.	Stanford	Hawaii	Clarence T. C. Ching Athletics Complex • Honolulu, HI	CBS	L 20–23	15,194	
^{#}Rankings from AP Poll. All times are in Eastern Time.

==== Week One ====
Date	Time	Visiting team	Home team	Site	TV	Result	Attendance	Ref.
August 28	7:00 p.m.	East Carolina	NC State	Carter–Finley Stadium • Raleigh, NC (rivalry)	ACCN	W 24–17	56,919	
August 28	7:30 p.m.	Elon	Duke	Wallace Wade Stadium • Durham, NC	ACCNX/ESPN+	W 45–17	15,677	
August 29	7:00 p.m.	Kennesaw State	Wake Forest	Allegacy Federal Credit Union Stadium • Winston-Salem, NC	ACCN	W 10–9	30,789	
August 29	8:00 p.m.	Georgia Tech	Colorado	Folsom Field • Boulder, CO	ESPN	W 27–20	52,868	
August 30	Noon	Syracuse	No. 24 Tennessee	Mercedes-Benz Stadium • Atlanta, GA (Aflac Kickoff Game)	ABC	L 26–45	45,918	
August 30	Noon	Duquesne	Pittsburgh	Acrisure Stadium • Pittsburgh, PA (City Game)	ACCN	W 61–9	53,006	
August 30	2:00 p.m.	Fordham	Boston College	Alumni Stadium • Chestnut Hill, MA	ACCNX/ESPN+	W 66–10	41,221	
August 30	3:00 p.m.	Eastern Kentucky	Louisville	L&N Federal Credit Union Stadium • Louisville, KY	ACCN	W 51–17	50,536	
August 30	3:30 p.m.	No. 8 Alabama	Florida State	Doak Campbell Stadium • Tallahassee, FL	ABC	W 31–17	67,277	
August 30	6:00 p.m.	Coastal Carolina	Virginia	Scott Stadium • Charlottesville, VA	ACCN	W 48–7	46,143	
August 30	7:30 p.m.	No. 9 LSU	No. 4 Clemson	Memorial Stadium • Clemson, SC	ABC	L 10–17	81,500	
August 30	9:00 p.m.	East Texas A&M	No. 16 SMU	Gerald J. Ford Stadium • University Park, TX	ACCN	W 42–13	33,044	
August 30	10:30 p.m.	California	Oregon State	Reser Stadium • Corvallis, OR	ESPN	W 34–15	31,630	
August 31	3:00 p.m.	Virginia Tech	No. 13 South Carolina	Mercedes-Benz Stadium • Atlanta, GA (Aflac Kickoff Game)	ESPN	L 11–24	55,531	
August 31	7:30 p.m.	No. 6 Notre Dame	No. 10 Miami (FL)	Hard Rock Stadium • Miami Gardens, FL (rivalry)	ABC	W 27–24	66,793	
September 1	8:00 p.m.	TCU	North Carolina	Kenan Stadium • Chapel Hill, NC	ESPN	L 14–48	50,500	
^{#}Rankings from AP Poll. All times are in Eastern Time.

Date	Bye Week
August 30	Stanford

==== Week Two ====
Date	Time	Visiting team	Home team	Site	TV	Result	Attendance	Ref.
September 5	7:00 p.m.	James Madison	Louisville	L&N Federal Credit Union Stadium • Louisville, KY	ESPN2	W 28–14	48,717	
September 6	Noon	No. 11 Illinois	Duke	Wallace Wade Stadium • Durham, NC	ESPN	L 19–45	23,893	
September 6	Noon	Virginia	NC State	Carter–Finley Stadium • Raleigh, NC	ESPN2	NCSU 35–31 (Note: Although both NC State and Virginia are ACC members, this game will not count in the conference standings. The schools scheduled it as a non-conference game because they otherwise meet every two or three years due to it not being a protected matchup.)	56,919	
September 6	Noon	Baylor	No. 17 SMU	Gerald J. Ford Stadium • University Park, TX	The CW	L 35–38 ^{2OT}	34,852	
September 6	Noon	Central Michigan	Pittsburgh	Acrisure Stadium • Pittsburgh, PA	ESPNU	W 45–17	48,424	
September 6	Noon	UConn	Syracuse	JMA Wireless Dome • Syracuse, NY (rivalry)	ACCNX/ESPN+	W 27–20 ^{OT}	39,391	
September 6	Noon	East Texas A&M	No. 14 Florida State	Doak Campbell Stadium • Tallahassee, FL	ACCN	W 77–3	65,430	
September 6	2:00 p.m.	Western Carolina	Wake Forest	Allegacy Federal Credit Union Stadium • Winston-Salem, NC	ACCNX/ESPN+	W 42–10	28,239	
September 6	3:30 p.m.	Gardner–Webb	Georgia Tech	Bobby Dodd Stadium • Atlanta, GA	ACCNX/ESPN+	W 59–12	37,775	
September 6	3:30 p.m.	Troy	No. 8 Clemson	Memorial Stadium • Clemson, SC	ACCN	W 27–16	77,890	
September 6	6:00 p.m.	Texas Southern	California	California Memorial Stadium • Berkeley, CA	ACCNX/ESPN+	W 35–3	35,898	
September 6	7:00 p.m.	North Carolina	Charlotte	Jerry Richardson Stadium • Charlotte, NC	ESPN+	W 20–3	19,233	
September 6	7:00 p.m.	Bethune–Cookman	No. 5 Miami (FL)	Hard Rock Stadium • Miami Gardens, FL	ACCNX/ESPN+	W 45–3	60,617	
September 6	7:30 p.m.	Vanderbilt	Virginia Tech	Lane Stadium • Blacksburg, VA	ACCN	L 20–44	65,632	
September 6	7:30 p.m.	Boston College	Michigan State	Spartan Stadium • East Lansing, MI	NBC	L 40–42 ^{2OT}	70,510	
September 6	10:15 p.m.	Stanford	BYU	LaVell Edwards Stadium • Provo, UT	ESPN	L 3–27	64,692	
^{#}Rankings from AP Poll. All times are in Eastern Time.

==== Week Three ====
Date	Time	Visiting team	Home team	Site	TV	Result	Attendance	Ref.
September 11	7:30 p.m.	NC State	Wake Forest	Allegacy Federal Credit Union Stadium • Winston-Salem, NC (rivalry)	ESPN	NCSU 34–24	29,043	
September 12	7:00 p.m.	Colgate	Syracuse	JMA Wireless Dome • Syracuse, NY (rivalry)	ACCN	W 66–24	37,372	
September 13	Noon	William & Mary	Virginia	Scott Stadium • Charlottesville, VA	ACCN	W 55–16	38,512	
September 13	Noon	No. 12 Clemson	Georgia Tech	Bobby Dodd Stadium • Atlanta, GA (rivalry)	ESPN	GT 24–21	48,059	
September 13	3:30 p.m.	SMU	Missouri State	Robert W. Plaster Stadium • Springfield, MO	CBSSN	W 28–10	15,027	
September 13	3:30 p.m.	Pittsburgh	West Virginia	Milan Puskar Stadium • Morgantown, WV (Backyard Brawl)	ESPN	L 24–31 ^{OT}	62,108	
September 13	3:30 p.m.	Richmond	North Carolina	Kenan Stadium • Chapel Hill, NC	ACCN	W 41–6	50,500	
September 13	4:30 p.m.	No. 18 South Florida	No. 5 Miami (FL)	Hard Rock Stadium • Miami Gardens, FL	The CW	W 49–12	66,591	
September 13	7:00 p.m.	Old Dominion	Virginia Tech	Lane Stadium • Blacksburg, VA	ACCN	L 26–45	57,627	
September 13	8:00 p.m.	Duke	Tulane	Yulman Stadium • New Orleans, LA	ESPN2	L 27–34	30,000	
September 13	10:30 p.m.	Minnesota	California	California Memorial Stadium • Berkeley, CA	ESPN	W 27–14	38,556	
September 13	10:30 p.m.	Boston College	Stanford	Stanford Stadium • Stanford, CA	ACCN	STAN 30–20	22,162	
^{#}Rankings from AP Poll. All times are in Eastern Time.

Date	Bye Week	
September 13	No. 10 Florida State	Louisville

==== Week Four ====
Date	Time	Visiting team	Home team	Site	TV	Result	Attendance	Ref.
September 20	Noon	Syracuse	Clemson	Memorial Stadium • Clemson, SC	ESPN	SYR 34–21	80,225	
September 20	Noon	SMU	TCU	Amon G. Carter Stadium • Fort Worth, TX (rivalry)	ESPN2	L 24–35	43,333	
September 20	Noon	Bowling Green	Louisville	L&N Federal Credit Union Stadium • Louisville, KY	ACCN	W 40–17	49,482	
September 20	Noon	Wofford	Virginia Tech	Lane Stadium • Blacksburg, VA	ACCNX/ESPN+	W 38–6	57,229	
September 20	3:30 p.m.	Kent State	No. 7 Florida State	Doak Campbell Stadium • Tallahassee, FL	ACCN	W 66–10	67,277	
September 20	3:30 p.m.	North Carolina	UCF	FBC Mortgage Stadium • Orlando, FL	FOX	L 9–34	44,206	
September 20	4:00 p.m.	NC State	Duke	Wallace Wade Stadium • Durham, NC	ESPN2	DUKE 45–33	30,022	
September 20	4:30 p.m.	Temple	No. 18 Georgia Tech	Bobby Dodd Stadium • Atlanta, GA	The CW	W 45–24	45,123	
September 20	7:30 p.m.	Florida	No. 4 Miami (FL)	Hard Rock Stadium • Miami Gardens, FL (rivalry)	ABC	W 26–7	66,713	
September 20	7:30 p.m.	Stanford	Virginia	Scott Stadium • Charlottesville, VA	ACCN	UVA 48–20	36,223	
September 20	10:30 p.m.	California	San Diego State	Snapdragon Stadium • San Diego, CA	CBSSN	L 0–34	31,369	
^{#}Rankings from AP Poll. All times are in Eastern Time.

Date	Bye Week		
September 20	Boston College	Pittsburgh	Wake Forest

==== Week Five ====
Date	Time	Visiting team	Home team	Site	TV	Result	Attendance	Ref.
September 26	7:00 p.m.	No. 8 Florida State	Virginia	Scott Stadium • Charlottesville, VA (Jefferson–Eppes Trophy)	ESPN	UVA 46–38 ^{2OT}	50,107	
September 27	Noon	No. 16 Georgia Tech	Wake Forest	Allegacy Federal Credit Union Stadium • Winston-Salem, NC	ESPN	GT 30–29 ^{OT}	30,264	
September 27	Noon	Louisville	Pittsburgh	Acrisure Stadium • Pittsburgh, PA	ESPN2	LOU 34–27	45,301	
September 27	Noon	Duke	Syracuse	JMA Wireless Dome • Syracuse, NY	ACCN	DUKE 38–3	44,451	
September 27	3:30 p.m.	California	Boston College	Alumni Stadium • Chestnut Hill, MA	ACCN	CAL 28–24	44,500	
September 27	7:00 p.m.	Virginia Tech	NC State	Carter–Finley Stadium • Raleigh, NC	The CW	VT 23–21	56,919	
September 27	7:30 p.m.	San Jose State	Stanford	Stanford Stadium • Stanford, CA (Bill Walsh Legacy Game)	ACCN	W 30–29	26,357	
^{#}Rankings from AP Poll. All times are in Eastern Time.

Date	Bye Week			
September 27	Clemson	No. 2 Miami (FL)	North Carolina	SMU

==== Week Six ====
Date	Time	Visiting team	Home team	Site	TV	Result	Attendance	Ref.
October 4	Noon	Clemson	North Carolina	Kenan Stadium • Chapel Hill, NC	ESPN	CLEM 38–10	50,500	
October 4	Noon	Boston College	Pittsburgh	Acrisure Stadium • Pittsburgh, PA	ACCN	PITT 48–7	51,101	
October 4	1:00 p.m.	Wake Forest	Virginia Tech	Lane Stadium • Blacksburg, VA	The CW	WF 30–23	65,632	
October 4	2:00 p.m.	Campbell	NC State	Carter–Finley Stadium • Raleigh, NC	ACCNX/ESPN+	W 56–10	56,919	
October 4	3:30 p.m.	No. 24 Virginia	Louisville	L&N Federal Credit Union Stadium • Louisville, KY	ESPN2	UVA 30–27 ^{OT}	50,032	
October 4	3:30 p.m.	Syracuse	SMU	Gerald J. Ford Stadium • University Park, TX	ACCN	SMU 31–18	34,845	
October 4	7:30 p.m.	No. 3 Miami (FL)	No. 18 Florida State	Doak Campbell Stadium • Tallahassee, FL (rivalry)	ABC	MIA 28–22	67,277	
October 4	10:30 p.m.	Duke	California	California Memorial Stadium • Berkeley, CA	ESPN	DUKE 45–21	42,240	
^{#}Rankings from AP Poll. All times are in Eastern Time.

Date	Bye Week	
October 4	No. 17 Georgia Tech	Stanford

==== Week Seven ====
Date	Time	Visiting team	Home team	Site	TV	Result	Attendance	Ref.
October 11	Noon	Pittsburgh	No. 25 Florida State	Doak Campbell Stadium • Tallahassee, FL	ESPN	PITT 34–31	65,256	
October 11	1Noon	Stanford	SMU	Gerald J. Ford Stadium • University Park, TX	The CW	SMU 34–10	30,654	
October 11	3:30 p.m.	Virginia Tech	No. 13 Georgia Tech	Bobby Dodd Stadium • Atlanta, GA (Techmo Bowl)	ACCN	GT 35–20	50,878	
October 11	3:30 p.m.	NC State	No. 16 Notre Dame	Notre Dame Stadium • Notre Dame, IN	Peacock	L 7–36	77,622	
October 11	3:30 p.m.	Wake Forest	Oregon State	Reser Stadium • Corvallis, OR	The CW	W 39–14	29,710	
October 11	7:30 p.m.	Clemson	Boston College	Alumni Stadium • Chestnut Hill, MA (O'Rourke–McFadden Trophy)	ACCN	CLEM 41–10	42,265	
^{#}Rankings from AP Poll. All times are in Eastern Time.

Date	Bye Week						
October 11	California	Duke	Louisville	No. 2 Miami (FL)	North Carolina	Syracuse	No. 19 Virginia

==== Week Eight ====
Date	Time	Visiting team	Home team	Site	TV	Result	Attendance	Ref.
October 17	7:00 p.m.	Louisville	No. 2 Miami (FL)	Hard Rock Stadium • Miami Gardens, FL (rivalry)	ESPN	LOU 24–21	66,573	
October 17	10:30 p.m.	North Carolina	California	California Memorial Stadium • Berkeley, CA	ESPN	CAL 21–18	33,401	
October 18	Noon	No. 12 Georgia Tech	Duke	Wallace Wade Stadium • Durham, NC	ESPN	GT 27–18	27,846	
October 18	Noon	UConn	Boston College	Alumni Stadium • Chestnut Hill, MA	ACCN	L 23–38	38,917	
October 18	3:30 p.m.	SMU	Clemson	Memorial Stadium • Clemson, SC	ACCN	SMU 35–24	78,669	
October 18	6:30 p.m.	Washington State	No. 18 Virginia	Scott Stadium • Charlottesville, VA	The CW	W 22–20	56,048	
October 18	7:30 p.m.	Pittsburgh	Syracuse	JMA Wireless Dome • Syracuse, NY (rivalry)	ACCN	PITT 30–13	40,772	
October 18	10:30 p.m.	Florida State	Stanford	Stanford Stadium • Stanford, CA	ESPN	STAN 20–13	26,470	
^{#}Rankings from AP Poll. All times are in Eastern Time.

Date	Bye Week		
October 18	NC State	Virginia Tech	Wake Forest

==== Week Nine ====
Date	Time	Visiting team	Home team	Site	TV	Result	Attendance	Ref.
October 24	7:30 p.m.	California	Virginia Tech	Lane Stadium • Blacksburg, VA	ESPN	VT 42–34 ^{2OT}	53,837	
October 25	Noon	Syracuse	No. 7 Georgia Tech	Bobby Dodd Stadium • Atlanta, GA	ESPN	GT 41–16	51,913	
October 25	Noon	No. 16 Virginia	North Carolina	Kenan Stadium • Chapel Hill, NC (rivalry)	ACCN	UVA 17–16 ^{OT}	50,500	
October 25	Noon	SMU	Wake Forest	Allegacy Federal Credit Union Stadium • Winston-Salem, NC	The CW	WF 13–12	28,358	
October 25	3:30 p.m.	NC State	Pittsburgh	Acrisure Stadium • Pittsburgh, PA	ACCN	PITT 53–34	46,840	
October 25	7:00 p.m.	Stanford	No. 9 Miami (FL)	Hard Rock Stadium • Miami Gardens, FL	ESPN	MIA 42–7	63,892	
October 25	7:30 p.m.	Boston College	No. 19 Louisville	L&N Federal Credit Union Stadium • Louisville, KY	ACCN	LOU 38–24	50,320	
^{#}Rankings from AP Poll. All times are in Eastern Time.

Date	Bye Week		
October 25	Clemson	Duke	Florida State

==== Week Ten ====
Date	Time	Visiting team	Home team	Site	TV	Result	Attendance	Ref.
October 31	7:30 p.m.	North Carolina	Syracuse	JMA Wireless Dome • Syracuse, NY	ESPN	UNC 27–10	37,184	
November 1	Noon	No. 10 Miami (FL)	SMU	Gerald J. Ford Stadium • University Park, TX	ESPN	SMU 26–20 ^{OT}	35,074	
November 1	Noon	Duke	Clemson	Memorial Stadium • Clemson, SC	ACCN	DUKE 46–45	75,809	
November 1	3:00 p.m.	No. 16 Louisville	Virginia Tech	Lane Stadium • Blacksburg, VA	The CW	LOU 28–16	54,030	
November 1	3:30 p.m.	No. 12 Notre Dame	Boston College	Alumni Stadium • Chestnut Hill, MA (rivalry)	ESPN	L 10–25	44,500	
November 1	3:30 p.m.	Pittsburgh	Stanford	Stanford Stadium • Stanford, CA	ACCN	PITT 35–20	16,540	
November 1	3:45 p.m.	No. 15 Virginia	California	California Memorial Stadium • Berkeley, CA	ESPN2	UVA 31–21	30,893	
November 1	7:30 p.m.	No. 8 Georgia Tech	NC State	Carter-Finley Stadium • Raleigh, NC	ESPN2	NCSU 48–36	56,919	
November 1	7:30 p.m.	Wake Forest	Florida State	Doak Campbell Stadium • Tallahassee, FL	ACCN	FSU 42–7	63,677	
^{#}Rankings from AP Poll. All times are in Eastern Time.

==== Week Eleven ====
Date	Time	Visiting team	Home team	Site	TV	Result	Attendance	Ref.
November 8	Noon	SMU	Boston College	Alumni Stadium • Chestnut Hill, MA	ACCN	SMU 45–13	38,345	
November 8	3:30 p.m.	Syracuse	No. 18 Miami (FL)	Hard Rock Stadium • Miami Gardens, FL	ESPN	MIA 38–10	60,337	
November 8	3:30 p.m.	Duke	UConn	Rentschler Field • East Hartford, CT	CBSSN	L 34–37	38,106	
November 8	4:30 p.m.	Stanford	North Carolina	Kenan Stadium • Chapel Hill, NC	The CW	UNC 20–15	50,500	
November 8	7:00 p.m.	California	No. 15 Louisville	L&N Federal Credit Union Stadium • Louisville, KY	ESPN2	CAL 29–26 ^{OT}	51,381	
November 8	7:00 p.m.	Florida State	Clemson	Memorial Stadium • Clemson, SC (rivalry)	ACCN	CLEM 24–10	81,500	
November 8	7:00 p.m.	Wake Forest	No. 14 Virginia	Scott Stadium • Charlottesville, VA	ESPN	WF 16–9	55,568	
^{#}Rankings from College Football Playoff. All times are in Eastern Time.

Date	Bye Week			
November 8	No. 17 Georgia Tech	NC State	No. 24 Pittsburgh	Virginia Tech

==== Week Twelve ====
Date	Time	Visiting team	Home team	Site	TV	Result	Attendance	Ref.
November 14	7:30 p.m.	Clemson	No. 20 Louisville	L&N Federal Credit Union Stadium • Louisville, KY	ESPN	CLEM 20–19	51,234	
November 15	Noon	No. 9 Notre Dame	No. 22 Pittsburgh	Acrisure Stadium • Pittsburgh, PA (rivalry)	ABC	L 15–37	68,400	
November 15	3:30 p.m.	NC State	No. 15 Miami (FL)	Hard Rock Stadium • Miami Gardens, FL	ESPN	MIA 41–7	59,157	
November 15	3:30 p.m.	No. 19 Virginia	Duke	Wallace Wade Stadium • Durham, NC	ESPN2	UVA 34–17	27,215	
November 15	3:30 p.m.	No. 16 Georgia Tech	Boston College	Alumni Stadium • Chestnut Hill, MA	ACCN	GT 36–34	37,879	
November 15	4:30 p.m.	North Carolina	Wake Forest	Allegacy Federal Credit Union Stadium • Winston-Salem, NC (rivalry)	The CW	WF 28–12	32,390	
November 15	7:30 p.m.	Virginia Tech	Florida State	Doak Campbell Stadium • Tallahassee, FL	ACCN	FSU 34–14	64,937	
^{#}Rankings from College Football Playoff. All times are in Eastern Time.

Date	Bye Week			
November 15	California	SMU	Stanford	Syracuse

==== Week Thirteen ====
Date	Time	Visiting team	Home team	Site	TV	Result	Attendance	Ref.
November 21	8:00 p.m.	Florida State	NC State	Carter-Finley Stadium • Raleigh, NC	ESPN	NCSU 21–11	56,919	
November 22	Noon	Louisville	SMU	Gerald J. Ford Stadium • Dallas, TX	ESPN2	SMU 38–6	32,713	
November 22	Noon	No. 13 Miami (FL)	Virginia Tech	Lane Stadium • Blacksburg, VA (rivalry)	ESPN	MIA 34–17	65,632	
November 22	Noon	Delaware	Wake Forest	Allegacy Federal Credit Union Stadium • Winston-Salem, NC	ACCN	W 52–14	26,950	
November 22	3:30 p.m.	Duke	North Carolina	Kenan Stadium • Chapel Hill, NC (Victory Bell)	ACCN	DUKE 32–25	50,500	
November 22	3:30 p.m.	Syracuse	No. 9 Notre Dame	Notre Dame Stadium • Notre Dame, IN	NBC	L 7–70	77,622	
November 22	4:30 p.m.	Furman	Clemson	Memorial Stadium • Clemson, SC	The CW	W 45–10	78,403	
November 22	7:00 p.m.	Pittsburgh	No. 16 Georgia Tech	Bobby Dodd Stadium • Atlanta, GA	ESPN	PITT 42–28	52,413	
November 22	7:30 p.m.	California	Stanford	Stanford Stadium • Stanford, CA (Big Game)	ACCN	STAN 31–10	50,039	
^{#}Rankings from College Football Playoff. All times are in Eastern Time.

Date	Bye Week	
November 22	Boston College	No. 19 Virginia

==== Week Fourteen ====
Date	Time	Visiting team	Home team	Site	TV	Result	Attendance	Ref.
November 28	3:30 p.m.	No. 4 Georgia	No. 23 Georgia Tech	Mercedes-Benz Stadium • Atlanta, GA (Clean, Old-Fashioned Hate)	ABC	L 9–16	73,728	
November 29	Noon	No. 12 Miami (FL)	No. 22 Pittsburgh	Acrisure Stadium • Pittsburgh, PA	ABC	MIA 38–7	49,845	
November 29	Noon	Kentucky	Louisville	L&N Federal Credit Union Stadium • Louisville, KY (Governor's Cup)	ACCN	W 41–0	50,634	
November 29	Noon	Clemson	South Carolina	Williams–Brice Stadium • Columbia, SC (Palmetto Bowl)	SECN	W 28–14	79,827	
November 29	3:00 p.m.	Boston College	Syracuse	JMA Wireless Dome • Syracuse, NY	The CW	BC 34–12	32,457	
November 29	3:30 p.m.	Wake Forest	Duke	Wallace Wade Stadium • Durham, NC (rivalry)	ACCN	DUKE 49–32	21,045	
November 29	4:30 p.m.	Florida State	Florida	Ben Hill Griffin Stadium • Gainesville, FL (rivalry)	ESPN2	L 21–40	90,007	
November 29	7:00 p.m.	Virginia Tech	No. 18 Virginia	Scott Stadium • Charlottesville, VA (rivalry)	ESPN	UVA 27–7	58,832	
November 29	7:30 p.m.	North Carolina	NC State	Carter-Finley Stadium • Raleigh, NC (rivalry)	ACCN	NCSU 42–19	56,919	
November 29	8:00 p.m.	No. 21 SMU	California	California Memorial Stadium • Berkeley, CA	ESPN2	CAL 38–35	28,956	
November 29	10:30 p.m.	No. 9 Notre Dame	Stanford	Stanford Stadium • Stanford, CA (rivalry)	ESPN	L 20–49	27,456	
^{#}Rankings from College Football Playoff. All times are in Eastern Time.

==== Championship Game ====
Date	Time	Visiting team	Home team	Site	TV	Result	Attendance	Ref.
December 6	8:00 p.m.	Duke	No. 17 Virginia	Bank of America Stadium • Charlotte, NC	ABC	DUKE 27–20 ^{OT}	41,672	
^{#}Rankings from College Football Playoff. All times are in Eastern Time.

== Head-to-head matchups ==
2025 ACC head-to-head matchups
Team	Boston College	California	Clemson	Duke	Florida State	Georgia Tech	Louisville	Miami	NC State	North Carolina	Pittsburgh	SMU	Stanford	Syracuse	Virginia	Virginia Tech	Wake Forest
vs. Boston College	—	28–24	41–10	×	×	36–34	38–24	×	×	×	48–7	45–13	30–20	12–34	×	×	×
vs. California	24–28	—	×	45–21	×	×	26–29	×	×	18–21	×	35–38	31–10	×	31–21	42–34	×
vs. Clemson	10–41	×	—	46–45	10–24	24–21	19–20	×	×	10–38	×	35–24	×	34–21	×	×	×
vs. Duke	×	21–45	45–46	—	×	27–18	×	×	33–45	25–32	×	×	×	3–38	34–17	×	32–49
vs. Florida State	×	×	24–10	×	—	×	×	28–22	21–11	×	34–31	×	20–13	×	46–38	14–34	7–42
vs. Georgia Tech	34–36	×	21–24	18–27	×	—	×	×	48–36	×	42–28	×	×	16–41	×	20–35	29–30
vs. Louisville	24–38	29–26	20–19	×	×	×	—	21–24	×	×	27–34	38–6	×	×	30–27	16–28	×
vs. Miami	×	×	×	×	22–28	×	24–21	—	7–41	×	7–38	26–20	7–42	10–38	×	17–34	×
vs. NC State	×	×	×	45–33	11–21	36–48	×	41–7	—	19–42	53–34	×	×	×	×	23–21	24–34
vs. North Carolina	×	21–18	38–10	32–25	×	×	×	×	42–19	—	×	×	15–20	10–27	17–16	×	28–12
vs. Pittsburgh	7–48	×	×	×	31–34	28–42	34–27	38–7	34–53	×	—	×	20–35	13–30	×	×	×
vs. SMU	13–45	38–35	24–35	×	×	×	6–38	20–26	×	×	×	—	10–34	18–31	×	×	13–12
vs. Stanford	20–30	10–31	×	×	13–20	×	×	42–7	×	20–15	35–20	34–10	—	×	48–20	×	×
vs. Syracuse	34–12	×	21–34	38–3	×	41–16	×	38–10	×	27–10	30–13	31–18	×	—	×	×	×
vs. Virginia	×	21–31	×	17–34	38–46	×	27–30	×	×	16–17	×	×	20–48	×	—	7–27	16–9
vs. Virginia Tech	×	34–42	×	×	34–14	35–20	28–16	34–17	21–23	×	×	×	×	×	27–7	—	30–23
vs. Wake Forest	×	×	×	49–32	42–7	30–29	×	×	34–24	12–28	×	12–13	×	×	9–16	23–30	—
Total	1–7	4–4	4–4	6–2	2–6	6–2	4–4	6–2	4–4	2–6	6–2	6–2	3–5	1–7	7–1	2–6	4–4
	BC	CAL	CLEM	DUKE	FSU	GT	LOU	MIA	NCSU	UNC	PITT	SMU	STAN	SYR	UVA	VT	WF

× – Matchup not played in 2025
Updated after the season.

== ACC vs other conferences ==
=== ACC vs Power Four matchups ===
The following games include ACC teams competing against "Power Four" conference teams from the Big Ten, Big 12 and SEC, as well as Notre Dame. All rankings are from the AP Poll at the time of the game.

Date	Conference	Visitor	Home	Site	Score
August 29	Big 12	Georgia Tech	Colorado	Folsom Field • Boulder, CO	W 27–20
August 30	SEC	8 Alabama	Florida State	Doak Campbell Stadium • Tallahassee, FL	W 31–17
August 30	SEC	9 LSU	4 Clemson	Memorial Stadium • Clemson, SC	L 10–17
August 30	SEC	Syracuse	24 Tennessee†	Mercedes-Benz Stadium • Atlanta, GA	L 26–45
August 31	SEC	Virginia Tech	13 South Carolina†	Mercedes-Benz Stadium • Atlanta, GA	L 11–24
August 31	—	6 Notre Dame	10 Miami (FL)	Hard Rock Stadium • Miami Gardens, FL	W 27–24
September 1	Big 12	TCU	North Carolina	Kenan Stadium • Chapel Hill, NC	L 14–48
September 6	Big 12	Baylor	17 SMU	Gerald J. Ford Stadium • University Park, TX	L 35–38 ^{2OT}
September 6	Big Ten	Boston College	Michigan State	Spartan Stadium • East Lansing, MI	L 40–42 ^{2OT}
September 6	Big Ten	11 Illinois	Duke	Wallace Wade Stadium • Durham, NC	L 19–45
September 6	Big 12	Stanford	BYU	LaVell Edwards Stadium • Provo, UT	L 3–27
September 6	SEC	Vanderbilt	Virginia Tech	Lane Stadium • Blacksburg, VA	L 20–44
September 13	Big Ten	Minnesota	California	California Memorial Stadium • Berkeley, CA	W 27–14
September 13	Big 12	Pittsburgh	West Virginia	Milan Puskar Stadium • Morgantown, WV	L 24–31 ^{OT}
September 20	SEC	Florida	Miami (FL)	Hard Rock Stadium • Miami Gardens, FL	W 26–7
September 20	Big 12	North Carolina	UCF	FBC Mortgage Stadium • Orlando, FL	L 9–34
September 20	Big 12	SMU	TCU	Amon G. Carter Stadium • Fort Worth, TX	L 24–35
October 11	—	NC State	16 Notre Dame	Notre Dame Stadium • Notre Dame, IN	L 7–36
November 1	—	12 Notre Dame	Boston College	Alumni Stadium • Chestnut Hill, MA	L 10–25
November 15	—	9 Notre Dame	22 Pittsburgh	Acrisure Stadium • Pittsburgh, PA	L 15–37
November 22	—	Syracuse	9 Notre Dame	Notre Dame Stadium • Notre Dame, IN	L 7–70
November 28	SEC	4 Georgia	23 Georgia Tech†	Mercedes-Benz Stadium • Atlanta, GA	L 9–16
November 29	SEC	Florida State	Florida	Ben Hill Griffin Stadium • Gainesville, FL	L 21–40
November 29	SEC	Kentucky	Louisville	L&N Federal Credit Union Stadium • Louisville, KY	W 41–0
November 29	—	9 Notre Dame	Stanford	Stanford Stadium • Stanford, CA	L 20–49
November 29	SEC	Clemson	South Carolina	Williams–Brice Stadium • Columbia, SC	W 28–14

Note:† Denotes Neutral Site Game

=== ACC vs Group of Five matchups ===
The following games include ACC teams competing against teams from the American, C-USA, MAC, Mountain West, and Sun Belt, as well as the Pac-12.

Date	Conference	Visitor	Home	Site	Score
August 23	Mountain West	Stanford	Hawaii	Clarence T. C. Ching Athletics Complex • Honolulu, HI	L 20–23
August 28	American	East Carolina	NC State	Carter–Finley Stadium • Raleigh, NC	W 24–17
August 29	C-USA	Kennesaw State	Wake Forest	Allegacy Federal Credit Union Stadium • Winston-Salem, NC	W 10–9
August 30	Pac-12	California	Oregon State	Reser Stadium • Corvallis, OR	W 34–15
August 30	Sun Belt	Coastal Carolina	Virginia	Scott Stadium • Charlottesville, VA	W 48–7
September 5	Sun Belt	James Madison	Louisville	L&N Federal Credit Union Stadium • Louisville, KY	W 28–14
September 6	MAC	Central Michigan	Pittsburgh	Acrisure Stadium • Pittsburgh, PA	W 45–17
September 6	American	North Carolina	Charlotte	Jerry Richardson Stadium • Charlotte, NC	W 20–3
September 6	Sun Belt	Troy	8 Clemson	Memorial Stadium • Clemson, SC	W 27–16
September 13	American	Duke	Tulane	Yulman Stadium • New Orleans, LA	L 27–34
September 13	C-USA	SMU	Missouri State	Robert W. Plaster Stadium • Springfield, MO	W 28–10
September 13	Sun Belt	Old Dominion	Virginia Tech	Lane Stadium • Blacksburg, VA	L 26–45
September 13	American	18 South Florida	5 Miami (FL)	Hard Rock Stadium • Miami Gardens, FL	W 49–12
September 20	MAC	Bowling Green	Louisville	L&N Federal Credit Union Stadium • Louisville, KY	W 40–17
September 20	Mountain West	California	San Diego State	Snapdragon Stadium • San Diego, CA	L 0–34
September 20	MAC	Kent State	Florida State	Doak Campbell Stadium • Tallahassee, FL	W 66–10
September 20	American	Temple	Georgia Tech	Bobby Dodd Stadium • Atlanta, GA	W 45–24
September 27	Mountain West	San Jose State	Stanford	Stanford Stadium • Stanford, CA	W 30–29
October 11	Pac-12	Wake Forest	Oregon State	Reser Stadium • Corvallis, OR	W 39–14
October 18	Pac-12	Washington State	18 Virginia	Scott Stadium • Charlottesville, VA	W 22–20
November 22	C-USA	Delaware	Wake Forest	Allegacy Federal Credit Union Stadium • Winston-Salem, NC	W 52–14

=== ACC vs FBS independents matchups ===
The following games include ACC teams competing against FBS independent UConn (but excluding independent Notre Dame, which appears in the Power Four section above).

Date	Visitor	Home	Site	Score
September 6	UConn	Syracuse	JMA Wireless Dome • Syracuse, NY	W 27–20 ^{OT}
October 18	UConn	Boston College	Alumni Stadium • Chestnut Hill, MA	L 23–38
November 8	Duke	UConn	Rentschler Field • East Hartford, CT	L 34–37

=== ACC vs FCS matchups ===
The Football Championship Subdivision comprises 13 conferences and two independent programs.

Date	Visitor	Home	Site	Score
August 28	Elon	Duke	Wallace Wade Stadium • Durham, NC	W 45–17
August 30	Duquesne	Pittsburgh	Acrisure Stadium • Pittsburgh, PA	W 61–9
August 30	East Texas A&M	16 SMU	Gerald J. Ford Stadium • University Park, TX	W 42–13
August 30	Eastern Kentucky	Louisville	L&N Federal Credit Union Stadium • Louisville, KY	W 51–17
August 30	Fordham	Boston College	Alumni Stadium • Chestnut Hill, MA	W 66–10
September 6	Bethune–Cookman	5 Miami (FL)	Hard Rock Stadium • Miami Gardens, FL	W 45–3
September 6	East Texas A&M	14 Florida State	Doak Campbell Stadium • Tallahassee, FL	W 77–3
September 6	Gardner–Webb	Georgia Tech	Bobby Dodd Stadium • Atlanta, GA	W 59–12
September 6	Texas Southern	California	California Memorial Stadium • Berkeley, CA	W 35–3
September 6	Western Carolina	Wake Forest	Allegacy Federal Credit Union Stadium • Winston-Salem, NC	W 42–10
September 12	Colgate	Syracuse	JMA Wireless Dome • Syracuse, NY	W 66–24
September 13	Richmond	North Carolina	Kenan Stadium • Chapel Hill, NC	W 41–6
September 13	William & Mary	Virginia	Scott Stadium • Charlottesville, VA	W 55–16
September 20	Wofford	Virginia Tech	Lane Stadium • Blacksburg, VA	W 38–6
October 4	Campbell	NC State	Carter–Finley Stadium • Raleigh, NC	W 56–10
November 22	Furman	Clemson	Memorial Stadium • Clemson, SC	W 45–10

=== Records against other conferences ===
Regular season

Power 4 Conferences	Record
Big Ten	1–2
Big 12	1–6
Notre Dame	1–5
SEC	4–6
Power 4 Total	7–19
Other FBS Conferences	Record
American	4–1
C–USA	3–0
Independents (Excluding Notre Dame)	1–2
MAC	3–0
Mountain West	1–2
Pac-12	3–0
Sun Belt	3–1
Other FBS Total	18–6
FCS Opponents	Record
Football Championship Subdivision	16–0
Total Non-Conference Record	41–25

Post Season

Power 4 Conferences	Record
Big Ten	1–2
Big 12	2–1
SEC	4–0
Power 4 Total	7–3
Other FBS Conferences	Record
American	1–1
MAC	1–0
Mountain West	0–1
Other FBS Total	2–2
Total Bowl Record	9–5

== Postseason ==
=== Bowl games ===
Legend
ACC win
ACC loss
Cancellation

Bowl game	Date	Site	Time (EST)	Television	ACC team	Opponent	Score	Attendance
Gasparilla Bowl	December 19, 2025	Raymond James Stadium • Tampa, FL	2:30 p.m.	ESPN	NC State	Memphis	W 31–7	13,336
Boca Raton Bowl	December 23, 2025	Flagler Credit Union Stadium • Boca Raton, FL	2:00 p.m.	ESPN	Louisville	Toledo	W 27–22	15,329
Hawaii Bowl	December 24, 2025	Clarence T. C. Ching Athletics Complex • Honolulu, HI	3:00 p.m.	ESPN	California	Hawaii	L 31–35	15,194
Military Bowl	December 27, 2025	Navy–Marine Corps Memorial Stadium • Annapolis, MD	11:00 a.m.	ESPN	Pittsburgh	East Carolina	L 17–23	17,016
Pinstripe Bowl	December 27, 2025	Yankee Stadium • Bronx, NY	12:00 p.m.	ABC	Clemson	Penn State	L 10–22	41,101
Pop-Tarts Bowl	December 27, 2025	Camping World Stadium • Orlando, FL	3:30 p.m.	ABC	22 Georgia Tech	12 BYU	L 21–25	34,126
Gator Bowl	December 27, 2025	EverBank Stadium • Jacksonville, FL	7:30 p.m.	ABC	19 Virginia	Missouri	W 13–7	31,802
Sun Bowl	December 31, 2025	Sun Bowl • El Paso, TX	2:00 p.m.	CBS	Duke	Arizona State	W 42–39	44,975
Duke's Mayo Bowl	January 2, 2026	Bank of America Stadium • Charlotte, NC	8:00 p.m.	ESPN	Wake Forest	Mississippi State	W 43–29	29,328
Holiday Bowl	January 2, 2026	Snapdragon Stadium • San Diego, CA	8:00 p.m.	FOX	SMU	17 Arizona	W 24–19	30,602
College Football Playoff bowl games
College Football Playoff	December 20, 2025	Kyle Field • College Station, TX	12:00 p.m.	ABC	10 Miami	7 Texas A&M	W 10–3	104,122
Cotton Bowl	December 31, 2025	AT&T Stadium • Arlington, TX	7:30 p.m.	ESPN	10 Miami	2 Ohio State	W 24–14	71,323
Fiesta Bowl	January 8, 2026	State Farm Stadium • Glendale, AZ	7:30 p.m.	ESPN	10 Miami	6 Ole Miss	W 31–27	67,928
CFP National Championship	January 19, 2026	Hard Rock Stadium • Miami Gardens, FL	7:30 p.m.	ESPN	10 Miami	1 Indiana	L 21–27	67,227

== Awards and honors ==
=== Player of the week honors ===
Week	Quarterback		Receiver		Running Back		Offensive Line		Defensive Line		Linebacker		Defensive Back		Specialist			Rookie		
Week	Player	Team	Player	Team	Player	Team	Player	Team	Player	Team	Player	Team	Player	Team	Player	Team	Position	Player	Team	Position
Week 1	Haynes King	Georgia Tech	Cam Ross	Virginia	Isaac Brown	Louisville	Luke Petitbon	Florida State	Rueben Bain Jr.	Miami (FL)	Kyle Louis	Pittsburgh	Ahmaad Moses	SMU	Cam Ross	Virginia	WR	Jaron-Keawe Sagapolutele	California	QB
Week 2	Dylan Lonergan	Boston College	Duce Robinson	Florida State	Demond Claiborne	Wake Forest	Adrian Medley	Florida State	Vincent Anthony Jr.	Duke	TJ Quinn	Louisville	Omar Thornton	Boston College	Cam Ross (2)	Virginia	WR	Aaron Philo	Georgia Tech	QB
Week 3	Haynes King (2)	Georgia Tech	Darrell Gill Jr.	Syracuse	Micah Ford	Stanford	Keylan Rutledge	Georgia Tech	Isaiah Shirley	NC State	Mikai Gbayor	North Carolina	Omar Daniels	Georgia Tech	Aidan Birr	Georgia Tech	K	Jaron-Keawe Sagapolutele (2)	California	QB
Week 4	Chandler Morris	Virginia	Trell Harris	Virginia	Anderson Castle	Duke	McKale Boley	Virginia	Rueben Bain Jr. (2)	Miami (FL)	Antoine Deslauriers	Syracuse	DaShawn Stone	Duke	Marshall Nichols	Georgia Tech	P	Micahi Danzy	Florida State	WR
Week 5	Chandler Morris (2)	Virginia	Chris Bell	Louisville	Nate Sheppard	Duke	Brian Parker II	Duke	Mitchell Melton	Virginia	TJ Quinn (2)	Louisville	Ja'Son Prevard	Virginia	John Love	Virginia Tech	PK	Nate Sheppard	Duke	RB
Week 6	Carson Beck	Miami (FL)	Chris Bell (2)	Louisville	Hollywood Smothers	NC State	James Brockermeyer	Miami (FL)	Mitchell Melton (2)	Virginia	Kam Robinson	Virginia	Jakobe Thomas	Miami (FL)	Elijah Slibeck	Virginia	P	Mason Heintschel	Pittsburgh	QB
Week 7	Mason Heintschel	Pittsburgh	Desmond Reid	Pittsburgh	Demond Claiborne (2)	Wake Forest	Blake Miller	Clemson	Peter Woods	Clemson	Kyle Louis (2)	Pittsburgh	KP Price	Boston College	Nolan Hauser	Clemson	PK	Chris Barnes	Wake Forest	WR
Week 8	Haynes King (3)	Georgia Tech	Chris Bell (3)	Louisville	Cole Tabb	Stanford	Trevonte Sylvester	Louisville	Kevin Jobity Jr.	Syracuse	Kam Robinson (2)	Virginia	Jy Gilmore	Georgia Tech	Sam Keltner	SMU	PK	Cole Tabb	Stanford	RB
Week 9	Haynes King (4)	Georgia Tech	Kenny Johnson Jr.	Pittsburgh	Isaac Brown (2)	Louisville	Ethan Mackenny	Georgia Tech	Kemari Copeland	Virginia Tech	Cade Uluave	California	Davaughn Patterson	Wake Forest	Connor Calvert	Wake Forest	K	Mason Heintschel (2)	Pittsburgh	QB
Week 10	Darian Mensah	Duke	Duce Robinson (2)	Florida State	Jayden Scott	NC State	Teague Andersen	NC State	Melkart Abou Jaoude	North Carolina	Kam Robinson (3)	Virginia	Ahmaad Moses	SMU	Shamir Hagans	Duke	WR/KR	Jayden Scott	NC State	RB
Week 11	Jaron-Keawe Sagapolutele	California	Jacob De Jesus	California	TJ Harden	SMU	Francis Mauigoa	Miami	Isaiah Smith	SMU	Khmori House	North Carolina	Hezekiah Masses	California	Carlos Hernandez	Wake Forest	WR	Jaron-Keawe Sagapolutele (3)	California	QB
Week 12	Haynes King (5)	Georgia Tech	Trell Harris (2)	Virginia	J'Mari Taylor	Virginia	Keylan Rutledge (2)	Georgia Tech	Fisher Camac	Virginia	Sammy Brown	Clemson	Jakobe Thomas (2)	Miami (FL)	Aidan Birr (2)	Georgia Tech	PK	Malachi Toney	Miami (FL)	WR
Week 13	Carson Beck (2)	Miami (FL)	Carlos Hernandez	Wake Forest	Ja'Kyrian Turner	Pittsburgh	Logan Parr	SMU	Akheem Mesidor	Miami (FL)	Braylan Lovelace	Pittsburgh	Devon Marshall	NC State	Todd Pelino	Duke	PK	Ja'Kyrian Turner	Pittsburgh	RB
Week 14	Jaron-Keawe Sagapolutele (2)	California	Malachi Toney	Miami	Kendrick Raphael	California	Jacarrius Peak	NC State	T.J. Parker	Clemson	TJ Quinn (3)	Louisville	Ricardo Jones	Clemson	Sahmir Hagans	Duke	WR/KR	Jaron-Keawe Sagapolutele (4)	California	QB

=== All-conference teams ===
First-team

Position	Player	Team
First-team offense
QB	Haynes King	Georgia Tech
RB	Hollywood Smothers	NC State
RB	J'Mari Taylor	Virginia
WR	Duce Robinson	Florida State
WR	Chris Bell	Louisville
WR	Malachi Toney	Miami
TE	Justin Joly	NC State
All-purpose	Jacob De Jesus	California
OT	Francis Mauigoa	Miami
OT	Blake Miller	Clemson
G	Logan Parr	SMU
G	Keylan Rutledge	Georgia Tech
C	Luke Petitbon	Florida State
First-team defense
DE	Rueben Bain Jr.	Miami
DE	Akheem Mesidor	Miami
DT	Jordan van den Berg	Georgia Tech
DT	Peter Woods	Clemson
LB	Caden Fordham	NC State
LB	Cade Uluave	California
LB	Sammy Brown	Clemson
CB	Hezekiah Masses	California
CB	Avieon Terrell	Clemson
S	Nick Andersen	Wake Forest
S	Ahmaad Moses	SMU
First-team special teams
PK	Aidan Birr	Georgia Tech
P	Jack Stonehouse	Syracuse
RS	Jacob De Jesus	California

Second-team

Position	Player	Team
Second-team offense
QB	Darian Mensah	Duke
RB	Demond Claiborne	Wake Forest
RB	Nate Sheppard	Duke
WR	Cooper Barkate	Duke
WR	Jacob De Jesus	California
WR	Lewis Bond	Boston College
TE	Sam Roush	Stanford
All-purpose	Malachi Toney	Miami
OT	Brian Parker II	Duke
OT	P. J. Williams	SMU
G	Anez Cooper	Miami
G	Logan Taylor	Boston College
C	Brady Wilson	Virginia
Second-team defense
DE	Isaiah Smith	SMU
DE	Melkart Abou Jaoude	North Carolina
DT	Ahmad Moten Sr.	Miami
DT	Rene Konga	Louisville
LB	Kyle Louis	Pittsburgh
LB	Rasheem Biles	Pittsburgh
LB	Matt Rose	Stanford
CB	Chandler Rivers	Duke
CB	Keionte Scott	Miami
S	Jakobe Thomas	Miami
S	Earl Little Jr.	Florida State
Second-team special teams
PK	Trey Butkowski	Pittsburgh
P	Daniel Sparks	Virginia
RS	Sahmir Hagans	Duke

Third-team

Position	Player	Team
Third-team offense
QB	Carson Beck	Miami
RB	Mark Fletcher Jr.	Miami
RB	Isaac Brown	Louisville
WR	Jordan Hudson	SMU
WR	Trell Harris	Virginia
WR	Antonio Williams	Clemson
TE	Jeremiah Franklin	Boston College
All-purpose	Caullin Lacy	Louisville
OT	Markel Bell	Miami
OT	McKale Boley	Virginia
G	Noah Josey	Virginia
G	Justin Pickett	Duke
C	James Brockermeyer	Miami
Third-team defense
DE	Will Heldt	Clemson
DE	Clev Lubin	Louisville
DT	Kemari Copeland	Virginia Tech
DT	Aaron Hall	Duke
LB	Kam Robinson	Virginia
LB	TJ Quinn	Louisville
LB	Wesley Bissainthe	Miami
CB	Karon Prunty	Wake Forest
CB	Brent Austin	California
S	Ricardo Jones	Clemson
S	Devin Neal	Virginia
Third-team special teams
PK	Cooper Ranvier	Louisville
P	Marshall Nichols	Georgia Tech
RS	Chris Barnes	Wake Forest

=== ACC individual awards ===
ACC Player of the Year

Haynes King, Georgia Tech

ACC Rookie of the Year

Malachi Toney, WR, Miami

ACC Coach of the Year

Tony Elliott, Virginia

ACC Offensive Player of the Year

Haynes King, Georgia Tech

ACC Offensive Rookie of the Year

Malachi Toney, WR, Miami

Jacobs Blocking Trophy

Francis Mauigoa, OT, Miami

ACC Defensive Player of the Year

Rueben Bain Jr., Miami

ACC Defensive Rookie of the Year

Luke Ferrelli, LB, California

=== All-Americans ===
==== Consensus All-Americans ====
Currently, the NCAA compiles consensus all-America teams in the sports of Division I FBS football and Division I men's basketball using a point system computed from All-America teams named by coaches associations or media sources. Players are chosen against other players playing at their position only. To be selected a consensus All-American, players must be chosen to the first team on at least half of the five official selectors as recognized by the NCAA. Second- and third-team honors are used to break ties. Players named first-team by all five selectors are deemed unanimous All-Americans. Currently, the NCAA recognizes All-Americans selected by the AP, AFCA, FWAA, TSN, and the WCFF to determine consensus and unanimous All-Americans.

2025 Consensus All-Americans
Unanimous	Consensus
None	Francis Mauigoa – Miami; Rueben Bain Jr. – Miami

==== Associated Press ====
2025 AP All-Americans
First Team	Second Team	Third Team
Francis Mauigoa – Miami	Rueben Bain Jr. – Miami; Hezekiah Masses – California; Malachi Toney – Miami; Peter Woods – Clemson	Aidan Birr – Georgia Tech; Caden Fordham – NC State; Brian Parker II – Duke; Keylan Rutledge – Georgia Tech; Avieon Terrell – Clemson

==== AFCA ====
2025 AFCA All-Americans
First Team	Second Team
Rueben Bain Jr. – Miami	Hezekiah Masses – California; Keylan Rutledge – Georgia Tech

==== FWAA ====
2025 FWAA All-Americans
First Team	Second Team
None	Rueben Bain Jr. – Miami; Caullin Lacy – Louisville; Francis Mauigoa – Miami; Hezekiah Masses – California

==== The Sporting News ====
2025 Sporting News All-Americans
First Team	Second Team
Rueben Bain Jr. – Miami; Francis Mauigoa – Miami; Keylan Rutledge – Georgia Tech	Caden Fordham – NC State; Akheem Mesidor – Miami; Malachi Toney – Miami

==== WCFF ====
2025 Walter Camp All-Americans
First Team	Second Team
Rueben Bain Jr. – Miami; Francis Mauigoa – Miami	Hezekiah Masses – California; Brian Parker II – Duke; Keylan Rutledge – Georgia Tech

== Home game attendance ==
Team	Stadium	Capacity	Game 1	Game 2	Game 3	Game 4	Game 5	Game 6	Game 7	Game 8	Total	Average	% of Capacity
Boston College	Alumni Stadium	44,500	41,221	44,500	42,265	38,917	44,500	38,345	37,879	—N/a	287,627	41,090	92.34%
California	California Memorial Stadium	63,000	35,898	38,556	42,240	33,401	30,893	28,956	—N/a	—N/a	209,944	34,991	55.54%
Clemson	Memorial Stadium	81,500	81,500	77,890	80,225	78,669	75,809	81,500	78,403	—N/a	553,996	79,142	97.11%
Duke	Wallace Wade Stadium	35,018	15,677	23,893	30,022	27,846	27,215	21,045	—N/a	—N/a	145,698	24,283	69.34%
Florida State	Doak Campbell Stadium	67,277	67,277	65,430	67,277	67,277	65,256	63,677	64,937	—N/a	461,131	65,876	97.92%
Georgia Tech	Bobby Dodd Stadium	51,913	37,775	48,059	45,123	50,878	51,913	52,413	—N/a	—N/a	286,161	47,694	91.87%
Louisville	L&N Federal Credit Union Stadium	60,800	50,536	48,717	49,482	50,032	50,320	51,381	51,234	50,634	402,336	50,292	82.72%
Miami (FL)	Hard Rock Stadium	65,326	66,793	60,617	66,591	66,713	66,573	63,892	60,337	59,157	510,673	63,834	97.72%
NC State	Carter–Finley Stadium	56,919	56,919	56,919	56,919	56,919	56,919	56,919	56,919	—N/a	398,433	56,919	100%
North Carolina	Kenan Memorial Stadium	50,500	50,500	50,500	50,500	50,500	50,500	50,500	—N/a	—N/a	303,000	50,500	100%
Pittsburgh	Acrisure Stadium	68,400	53,006	48,424	45,301	51,101	46,840	68,400	49,845	—N/a	362,917	51,845	75.8%
SMU	Gerald J. Ford Stadium	32,000	33,044	34,852	34,845	30,654	35,074	32,713	—N/a	—N/a	201,182	33,530	104.78%
Stanford	Stanford Stadium	50,424	22,162	26,357	26,470	16,540	50,039	27,456	—N/a	—N/a	169,024	28,171	55.87%
Syracuse	JMA Wireless Dome	49,057	39,391	37,372	44,451	40,772	37,184	32,457	—N/a	—N/a	231,627	38,605	78.69%
Virginia	Scott Stadium	61,500	46,143	38,512	36,223	50,107	56,048	55,568	58,832	—N/a	341,433	48,776	79.31%
Virginia Tech	Lane Stadium	65,632	65,632	57,627	57,229	65,632	53,837	54,030	65,632	—N/a	419,619	59,946	91.34%
Wake Forest	Allegacy Federal Credit Union Stadium	31,500	30,789	28,239	29,043	30,264	28,358	32,390	26,950	—N/a	206,033	29,433	93.44%

== NFL draft ==
The 2026 NFL draft will be held in Pittsburgh, Pennsylvania. The following list includes all ACC players in the draft.

=== List of selections ===
Player	Position	School	Draft Round	Round Pick	Overall Pick	Team
Francis Mauigoa	OT	Miami	1	10	10	New York Giants
Rueben Bain Jr.	DE	Miami	1	15	15	Tampa Bay Buccaneers
Blake Miller	OT	Clemson	1	17	17	Detroit Lions
Akheem Mesidor	LB	Miami	1	22	22	Los Angeles Chargers
Keylan Rutledge	G	Georgia Tech	1	26	26	Houston Texans
Peter Woods	DT	Clemson	1	29	29	Kansas City Chiefs
T. J. Parker	DE	Clemson	2	3	35	Buffalo Bills
Avieon Terrell	CB	Clemson	2	16	48	Atlanta Falcons
Carson Beck	QB	Miami	3	1	65	Arizona Cardinals
Markel Bell	OT	Miami	3	4	68	Philadelphia Eagles
Sam Roush	TE	Stanford	3	5	69	Chicago Bears
Antonio Williams	WR	Clemson	3	7	71	Washington Commanders
Chris Bell	WR	Louisville	3	30	94	Miami Dolphins
Jakobe Thomas	S	Miami	3	34	98	Minnesota Vikings
Jude Bowry	OT	Boston College	4	2	102	Buffalo Bills
Darrell Jackson Jr.	DT	Florida State	4	3	103	New York Jets
Cade Klubnik	QB	Clemson	4	10	110	New York Jets
Keionte Scott	CB	Miami	4	16	116	Tampa Bay Buccaneers
Wesley Williams	DE	Duke	4	19	119	Jacksonville Jaguars
Wade Woodaz	LB	Clemson	4	23	123	Houston Texans
Matthew Hibner	TE	SMU	4	33	133	Baltimore Ravens
Kyle Louis	S	Pittsburgh	4	38	138	Miami Dolphins
Justin Joly	TE	NC State	5	12	152	Denver Broncos
DeMonte Capehart	DT	Clemson	5	15	155	Tampa Bay Buccaneers
Chandler Rivers	CB	Duke	5	22	162	Baltimore Ravens
Karon Prunty	CB	Wake Forest	5	31	171	New England Patriots
Adam Randall	RB	Clemson	5	34	174	Baltimore Ravens
Hezekiah Masses	CB	California	5	35	175	Las Vegas Raiders
Anez Cooper	G	Miami	6	7	188	New York Jets
Brian Parker II	C	Duke	6	8	189	Cincinnati Bengals
CJ Daniels	WR	Miami	6	16	197	Los Angeles Rams
Demond Claiborne	RB	Wake Forest	6	17	198	Minnesota Vikings
Logan Taylor	G	Boston College	6	21	202	Los Angeles Chargers
CJ Williams	WR	Stanford	6	22	203	Jacksonville Jaguars
Lewis Bond	WR	Boston College	6	23	204	Houston Texans
Jordan van den Berg	DT	Georgia Tech	6	32	213	Chicago Bears
Brandon Cleveland	DT	NC State	7	13	229	Las Vegas Raiders
Quintayvious Hutchins	DE	Boston College	7	31	247	New England Patriots

=== Total picks by school ===
Team	Round 1	Round 2	Round 3	Round 4	Round 5	Round 6	Round 7	Total
Boston College	—	—	—	1	—	2	1	4
California	—	—	—	—	1	—	—	1
Clemson	2	2	1	2	2	—	—	9
Duke	—	—	—	1	1	1	—	3
Florida State	—	—	—	1	—	—	—	1
Georgia Tech	1	—	—	—	—	1	—	2
Louisville	—	—	1	—	—	—	—	1
Miami (FL)	3	—	3	1	—	2	—	9
North Carolina	—	—	—	—	—	—	—	—
NC State	—	—	—	—	1	—	1	2
Pittsburgh	—	—	—	1	—	—	—	1
SMU	—	—	—	1	—	—	—	1
Stanford	—	—	1	—	—	1	—	2
Syracuse	—	—	—	—	—	—	—	—
Virginia	—	—	—	—	—	—	—	—
Virginia Tech	—	—	—	—	—	—	—	—
Wake Forest	—	—	—	—	1	1	—	2
Total	6	2	6	8	6	8	2	38
