= Melkart =

Melkart could refer to:

- Melqart, patron deity of the city-state of Tyre
- Melkart (crater), a crater on Ganymede
- Melkart Abou Jaoude, Lebanese-American college football player
