= Brian Parker II =

American football player (born 2004)

No. 62 – Cincinnati Bengals
- Position: Guard
- Roster status: Injured reserve

Personal information
- Born: January 6, 2004 (age 22); Mount Holly, New Jersey, U.S.
- Listed height: 6 ft 5 in (1.96 m)
- Listed weight: 310 lb (141 kg)

Career information
- High school: St. Xavier (Cincinnati, Ohio)
- College: Duke (2022–2025)
- NFL draft: 2026: 6th round, 189th overall pick

Career history
- Cincinnati Bengals (2026–present)

Awards and highlights
- 2x Second-team All-ACC (2024, 2025)
- Stats at Pro Football Reference

Brian Parker II (born January 6, 2004) is an American professional football guard for the Cincinnati Bengals of the National Football League (NFL). He played college football for the Duke Blue Devils and was selected by the Bengals in the sixth round of the 2026 NFL draft.

== Early life ==
Parker was born in Mount Holly, New Jersey. He comes from a family of athletes, as both his parents and grandfathers played college sports. His cousin, Dereck Lively II, plays in the National Basketball Association (NBA). Parker grew up in New Jersey before moving to Cincinnati, Ohio at 3 years old. In Cincinnati, he competed in football, baseball, wrestling, and lacrosse. He attended St. Xavier High School in Cincinnati where he competed in football and lacrosse, serving as starting center for the football team from 2020 to 2021. Parker was named the conference offensive lineman of the year twice and was a first-team all-state and all-district selection; he captained St. Xavier as a senior. A three-star recruit, he committed to play college football for the Duke Blue Devils.

== College career ==
Parker appeared in two games at Duke as a true freshman in 2022 and redshirted. The next year, he started seven games at right tackle. In his final two seasons, Parker started all 13 games each year. He was selected second-team All-Atlantic Coast Conference (ACC) in both 2024 and 2025 and was also a second-team All-American selection by the Walter Camp Foundation in 2025. Following the 2025 regular season, Parker opted to forgo remaining eligibility and declared for the 2026 NFL draft, also opting-out of Duke's bowl game. He concluded his collegiate career with 40 games played, 33 as a starter. He was invited to the 2026 East–West Shrine Bowl. Prior to the draft, Parker changed his position to center.

== Professional career ==
Pre-draft measurables
Height	Weight	Arm length	Hand span	Wingspan	40-yard dash	10-yard split	20-yard split	20-yard shuttle	Three-cone drill	Broad jump	Bench press
6 ft 5 1/4 in (1.96 m)	309 lb (140 kg)	32 7/8 in (0.84 m)	10 in (0.25 m)	6 ft 7 in (2.01 m)	5.14 s	1.78 s	2.96 s	4.80 s	7.66 s	9 ft 1 in (2.77 m)	29 reps
All values from NFL Combine

Parker was selected by the Cincinnati Bengals in the sixth round with the 189th overall pick of the 2026 NFL draft. He signed his rookie contract on May 8. Parker was placed on injured reserve due to a knee injury on August 30.
