= Peter Woods (American football) =

American football player (born 2005)

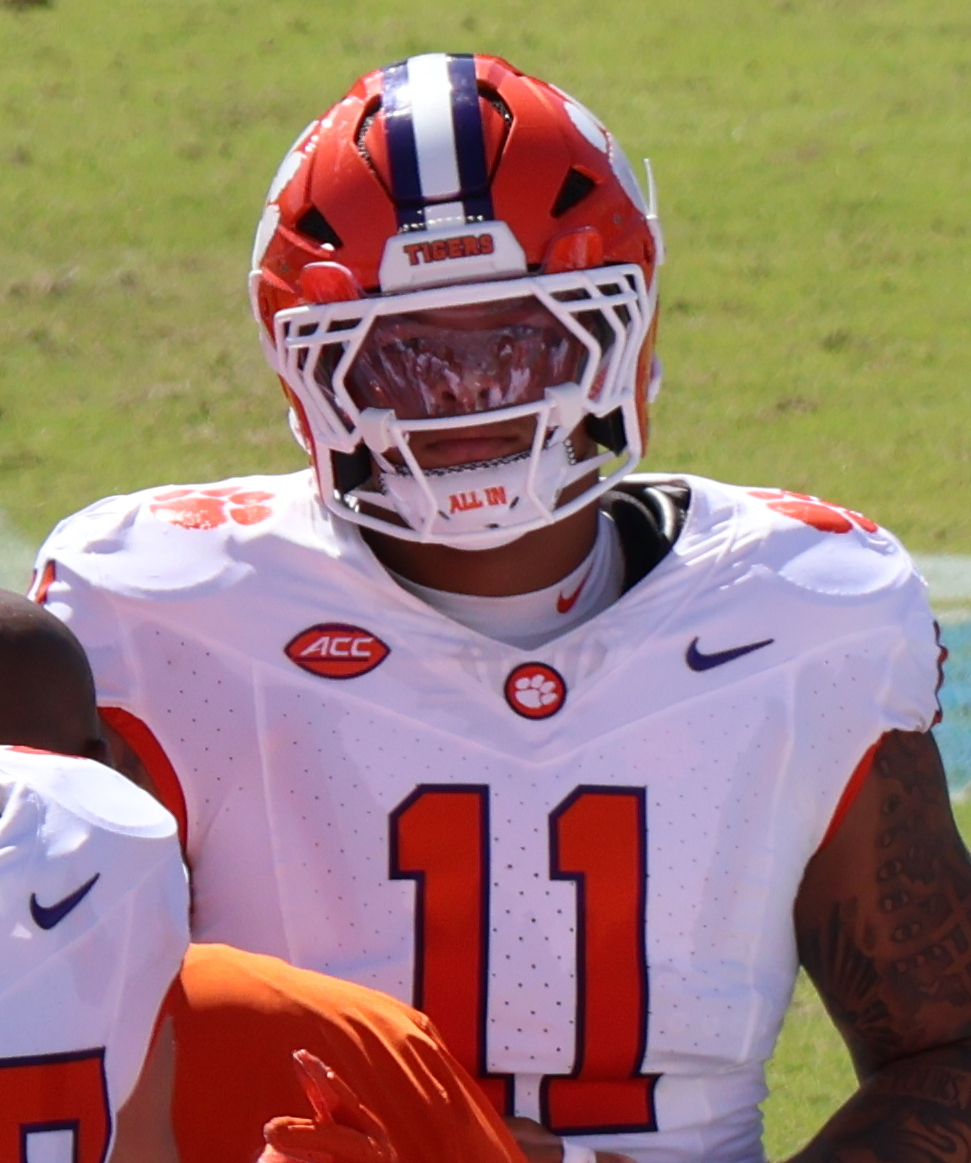
- Woods with the Clemson Tigers in 2025

No. 99 – Kansas City Chiefs
- Position: Defensive tackle
- Roster status: Active

Personal information
- Born: March 5, 2005 (age 21); Greensboro, Alabama, U.S.
- Listed height: 6 ft 2 in (1.88 m)
- Listed weight: 310 lb (141 kg)

Career information
- High school: Thompson (Alabaster, Alabama)
- College: Clemson (2023–2025)
- NFL draft: 2026: 1st round, 29th overall pick

Career history
- Kansas City Chiefs (2026−present)

Awards and highlights
- First-team All-ACC (2025)

Career NFL statistics as of Week 8, 2026
- Total tackles: 13
- Sacks: 0.5
- Pass deflections: 1
- Stats at Pro Football Reference

Peter Woods (born March 5, 2005) is an American professional football defensive tackle for the Kansas City Chiefs of the National Football League (NFL). He played college football for the Clemson Tigers and was selected by the Chiefs in the first round of the 2026 NFL draft.

== Early life ==
Woods was born on March 5, 2005, in Greensboro, Alabama. He attended Thompson High School in Alabaster, Alabama, winning four state championships. An Under Armour All-American, he was one of the top players in the 2023 college football recruiting class, ranked No. 9 nationally and as the top defensive tackle by ESPN.

== College career ==
Woods enrolled at Clemson University in early 2023. Prior to the start of the 2023 season, he was selected by 247Sports and ESPN as a true freshman preseason All-American. Woods declared for the 2026 NFL draft following the 2025 season.

=== Statistics ===
College statistics
Season	Games	Tackles				
Season	Games	Total	Solo	Ast	TFL	Sacks
2023	12	26	13	13	3	0.0
2024	11	28	18	10	8.5	3.0
2025	12	30	10	20	3.5	2.0
Career	35	84	41	43	14.5	5.0

== Professional career ==
Pre-draft measurables
Height	Weight	Arm length	Hand span	Wingspan	10-yard split	20-yard shuttle	Three-cone drill	Vertical jump	Broad jump
6 ft 2 1/2 in (1.89 m)	298 lb (135 kg)	31 1/4 in (0.79 m)	9 1/8 in (0.23 m)	6 ft 4 3/8 in (1.94 m)	1.67 s	4.54 s	7.70 s	29.0 in (0.74 m)	8 ft 8 in (2.64 m)
All values from NFL Combine/Pro Day

Woods was selected in the first round of the 2026 NFL draft with the 29th overall pick by the Kansas City Chiefs. The Chiefs previously acquired the selection as part of the trade that sent Trent McDuffie to the Los Angeles Rams.
