= Keylan Rutledge =

American football player (born 2003)

- Rutledge with the Houston Texans in 2026

No. 66 – Houston Texans
- Position: Guard
- Roster status: Active

Personal information
- Born: September 2, 2003 (age 23); Royston, Georgia, U.S.
- Listed height: 6 ft 4 in (1.93 m)
- Listed weight: 320 lb (145 kg)

Career information
- High school: Franklin County (Carnesville, Georgia)
- College: Middle Tennessee (2022–2023); Georgia Tech (2024–2025)
- NFL draft: 2026: 1st round, 26th overall pick

Career history
- Houston Texans (2026−present)

Awards and highlights
- First-team All-American (2025); Brian Piccolo Award (2025); 2× first-team All-ACC (2024, 2025); First-team All-CUSA (2023)

Career NFL statistics as of Week 4, 2026
- Games played: 4
- Games started: 4
- Stats at Pro Football Reference

Keylan Anthony Rutledge (born September 2, 2003) is an American professional football guard for the Houston Texans of the National Football League (NFL). He played college football for the Middle Tennessee Blue Raiders and Georgia Tech Yellow Jackets and was selected by the Texans in the first round of the 2026 NFL draft.

== Early life ==
Rutledge was born on September 2, 2003 in Royston, Georgia. He attended high school at Franklin County located in Franklin County, Georgia. Coming out of high school, he committed to play college football for the Middle Tennessee Blue Raiders.

== College career ==
=== Middle Tennessee ===
During his two-year career as a Blue Raider from 2022 through 2023 he played in 22 total games, while making 17 starts, where he was named first-team all-Conference USA in 2023. After the conclusion of the 2023 season, he decided to enter his name into the NCAA transfer portal.

=== Georgia Tech ===
Rutledge transferred to play for the Georgia Tech Yellow Jackets. During his first season as Yellow Jacket in 2024, he appeared in all 13 games, with 12 starts, where for his performance he was named first-team all-ACC. Heading into the 2025 season, Rutledge was named to the preseason all-ACC team, while also being named to the Outland Trophy watch list, as he projects to be one of the top players in the ACC and the nation. Following the 2025 season, Rutledge was named an All-American by multiple respected publication, and was named all-ACC. He took home the Piccolo Award, given to the ACC's most courageous player.

== Professional career ==
Pre-draft measurables
Height	Weight	Arm length	Hand span	Wingspan	40-yard dash	10-yard split	20-yard split	20-yard shuttle	Three-cone drill	Vertical jump	Broad jump	Bench press
6 ft 3 5/8 in (1.92 m)	316 lb (143 kg)	33 1/4 in (0.84 m)	10 in (0.25 m)	6 ft 9 3/8 in (2.07 m)	5.05 s	1.81 s	2.97 s	4.54 s	7.54 s	32.5 in (0.83 m)	8 ft 8 in (2.64 m)	27 reps
All values from NFL Combine/Pro Day

Rutledge was selected in the first round of the 2026 NFL draft with the 26th overall pick by the Houston Texans. On June 4, 2026, Rutledge signed his four-year rookie contract with the Texans.
