= Chandler Rivers =

American football player (born 2003)

No. 29 – Baltimore Ravens
- Position: Cornerback
- Roster status: Active

Personal information
- Born: October 17, 2003 (age 23); Beaumont, Texas, U.S.
- Listed height: 5 ft 9 in (1.75 m)
- Listed weight: 189 lb (86 kg)

Career information
- High school: Beaumont United
- College: Duke (2022–2025)
- NFL draft: 2026: 5th round, 162nd overall pick

Career history
- Baltimore Ravens (2026–present)

Awards and highlights
- First-team All-ACC (2024); Second-team All-ACC (2025)

Career NFL statistics as of Week 4, 2026
- Tackles: 9
- Stats at Pro Football Reference

Chandler Rivers (born October 17, 2003) is an American professional football cornerback for the Baltimore Ravens of the National Football League (NFL). He played college football for the Duke Blue Devils and was selected by the Ravens in the fifth round of the 2026 NFL draft.

== Early life ==
Rivers attended Beaumont United High School in Beaumont, Texas. He played cornerback and wide receiver in high school. During his career he had 25 interceptions on defense and 85 receptions for 1,715 yards with 31 total touchdowns on offense. Rated a 3 star prospect via 247. He committed to Duke University to play college football.

== College career ==
As a true freshman at Duke in 2022, Rivers started six of 13 games and had 52 tackles and one interception. He started all 13 games his sophomore year in 2023, recording 58 tackles and one interception which was returned for a touchdown. The pick-six came in the 2023 Birmingham Bowl and he was named the games MVP. Rivers returned to Duke as a starter his junior year in 2024, recording interceptions in three straight games, tying a Duke record. He was named first-team All-ACC, and also a second-team All-American by The Athletic and College Football Network.

== Professional career ==
Pre-draft measurables
Height	Weight	Arm length	Hand span	Wingspan	40-yard dash	10-yard split	20-yard split	20-yard shuttle	Three-cone drill	Vertical jump	Broad jump	Bench press
5 ft 9 1/2 in (1.77 m)	185 lb (84 kg)	29 3/8 in (0.75 m)	9 1/2 in (0.24 m)	6 ft 1 in (1.85 m)	4.40 s	1.55 s	2.56 s	4.18 s	6.96 s	39.0 in (0.99 m)	10 ft 10 in (3.30 m)	15 reps
All values from NFL Combine/Pro Day

Rivers was selected by the Baltimore Ravens in the fifth round with the 162nd overall pick of the 2026 NFL draft. Baltimore received the selection and Alohi Gilman from the Los Angeles Chargers in 2025.
