= Blake Miller (offensive tackle) =

American football player (born 2004)

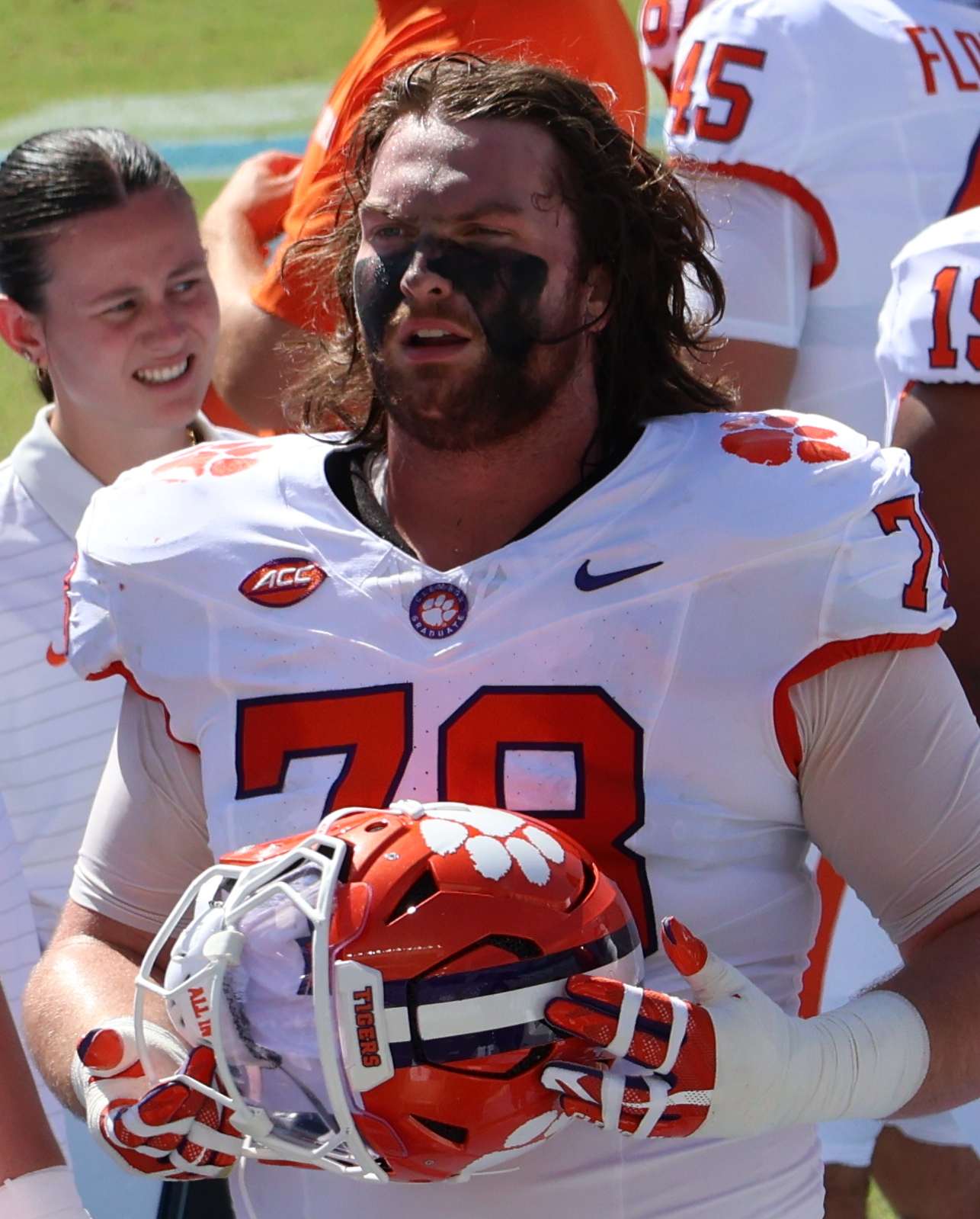
- Miller with the Clemson Tigers in 2025

No. 76 – Detroit Lions
- Position: Offensive tackle
- Roster status: Active

Personal information
- Born: February 25, 2004 (age 22)
- Listed height: 6 ft 6 in (1.98 m)
- Listed weight: 320 lb (145 kg)

Career information
- High school: Strongsville (Strongsville, Ohio)
- College: Clemson (2022–2025)
- NFL draft: 2026: 1st round, 17th overall pick

Career history
- Detroit Lions (2026–present)

Awards and highlights
- 2× First team All-ACC (2024, 2025); Third team All-ACC (2023); Freshman All-American (2022)

Career NFL statistics as of Week 4, 2026
- Games played: 3
- Games started: 3
- Stats at Pro Football Reference

Peter Blake Miller (born February 25, 2004) is an American professional football offensive tackle for the Detroit Lions of the National Football League (NFL). He played college football for the Clemson Tigers and was a three-time All-Atlantic Coast Conference (ACC) recipient. Miller was selected by the Lions in the first round of the 2026 NFL draft.

== Early life ==
Miller was born on February 25, 2004, and grew up in Strongsville, Ohio. He attended Strongsville High School and became a two-way starter as a lineman as a 14-year-old. He was named all-state, all-region and all-district in both his junior and senior seasons for his play on the offensive line, where he did not allow a single sack. He was ranked by 247Sports as the ninth-best player in the state and the 23rd-best offensive tackle nationally. He committed to play college football for the Clemson Tigers over a number of other offers that included the Ohio State Buckeyes.

== College career ==
Miller enrolled at Clemson in January 2022 and impressed early on. He won a starting job at right tackle to begin the season, becoming only the fourth true freshman on the offensive line to start for the team since 1972. He ultimately started all 14 games – being the third true freshman for the school to accomplish that feat since 1944 – and was named a Freshman All-American. The following year, he started 13 games and was named third-team All-ACC. In 2024 and 2025, he was again selected to the All-ACC team, earning consecutive first-team selections. He concluded his college career by setting a new Clemson record for offensive snaps from scrimmage with 3,778 snaps through 54 career starts from 2022 to 2025, not missing a game through four years.

== Professional career ==
Pre-draft measurables
Height	Weight	Arm length	Hand span	Wingspan	40-yard dash	10-yard split	20-yard split	20-yard shuttle	Three-cone drill	Vertical jump	Broad jump	Bench press
6 ft 6 3/4 in (2.00 m)	317 lb (144 kg)	34 1/4 in (0.87 m)	9 3/4 in (0.25 m)	6 ft 11 7/8 in (2.13 m)	5.04 s	1.75 s	2.92 s	4.65 s	7.75 s	32.0 in (0.81 m)	9 ft 5 in (2.87 m)	32 reps
All values from NFL Combine/Pro Day

Miller was selected by the Detroit Lions in the first round, 17th overall, of the 2026 NFL draft. He became the first offensive lineman from Clemson selected in the first round since the common draft era began in 1967. On May 12, 2026, he signed a four-year, $21.8 million contract with the Lions.
