= TJ Quinn =

American football player (born 2003)

No. 43 – Atlanta Falcons
- Position: Linebacker
- Roster status: Practice squad

Personal information
- Born: April 15, 2003 (age 23); Valdosta, Georgia, U.S.
- Listed height: 6 ft 0 in (1.83 m)
- Listed weight: 225 lb (102 kg)

Career information
- High school: Lowndes (Valdosta, Georgia)
- College: Louisville (2021–2025)
- NFL draft: 2026: undrafted

Career history
- Green Bay Packers (2026)*; Atlanta Falcons (2026–present)
- * Offseason or practice squad member only

Awards and highlights
- Third-team All-ACC (2025)
- Stats at Pro Football Reference

TJ Quinn (born April 15, 2003) is an American professional football linebacker for the Atlanta Falcons of the National Football League (NFL). He played college football for the Louisville Cardinals and he was signed as an undrafted free agent by the Packers in 2026.

== Early life ==
Quinn played high school football at Lowndes High School, in Valdosta, Georgia, where he was an all-region safety. On June 18, 2020, Quinn committed to play college football for the Louisville Cardinals.

== College career ==
Quinn joined the Cardinals as a safety and redshirted in 2021. The following season, he converted to playing middle linebacker and led the team in tackles during each of his final three seasons. Over the course of his career he amassed 289 tackles, five sacks, 15 tackles for loss, and nine passes defended.

== Professional career ==
Pre-draft measurables
Height	Weight	Arm length	Hand span	Wingspan	40-yard dash	10-yard split	20-yard split	20-yard shuttle	Three-cone drill	Vertical jump	Broad jump	Bench press
6 ft 0 1/4 in (1.84 m)	225 lb (102 kg)	32 1/2 in (0.83 m)	9 3/8 in (0.24 m)	6 ft 5 3/8 in (1.97 m)	4.53 s	1.50 s	2.61 s	4.41 s	7.32 s	33.0 in (0.84 m)	10 ft 2 in (3.10 m)	21 reps
All values from Pro Day

=== Green Bay Packers ===
Quinn was signed as an undrafted free agent by the Green Bay Packers after the conclusion of the 2026 NFL draft. On August 30, 2026, he was released by the Packers as a part of final roster cuts.

=== Atlanta Falcons ===
On October 20, 2026, Quinn signed with the Atlanta Falcons practice squad.

== Personal life ==
Quinn is the son of Terry Quinn, who played football at Louisville from 1991–94.
