= Karon Prunty =

American football player (born 2001)

No. 21 – New England Patriots
- Position: Cornerback
- Roster status: Active

Personal information
- Born: December 24, 2001 (age 24)
- Listed height: 6 ft 1 in (1.85 m)
- Listed weight: 192 lb (87 kg)

Career information
- High school: I. C. Norcom (Portsmouth, Virginia)
- College: Kansas (2020–2021); North Carolina A&T (2022–2024); Wake Forest (2025)
- NFL draft: 2026: 5th round, 171st overall pick

Career history
- New England Patriots (2026–present)

Awards and highlights
- Third-team All-ACC (2025)

Career NFL statistics as of Week 4, 2026
- Tackles: 1
- Stats at Pro Football Reference

Karon Prunty (born December 24, 2001) is an American professional football cornerback for the New England Patriots of the National Football League (NFL). He played college football for the Kansas Jayhawks, North Carolina A&T Aggies and Wake Forest Demon Deacons. Prunty was selected by the Patriots in the fifth round of the 2026 NFL draft.

== Early life ==
Prunty was born on December 24, 2001, and grew up in Portsmouth, Virginia. He attended Oscar F. Smith High School before transferring to I. C. Norcom High School, where he was a top football player. A three-star recruit and the 30th-ranked player in the state by ESPN, he committed to play college football for the Kansas Jayhawks. Prunty also ran track in high school.

== College career ==
Prunty was named a true freshman All-American at Kansas in 2020 after starting every game while posting 26 tackles and 10 pass breakups, the latter total placing him first nationally for true freshmen. He then redshirted during the 2021 season and transferred to the North Carolina A&T Aggies in 2022. With the Aggies in 2022, he posted 30 tackles and four interceptions, being named first-team All-Big South Conference and an honorable mention All-American. He then was named third-team All-Colonial Athletic Association (CAA) in 2023 while totaling 43 tackles and five pass breakups, followed by another third-team All-CAA selection in 2024 after he posted 27 tackles, four passes defended and an interception. Prunty transferred to the Wake Forest Demon Deacons for his final season in 2025 and recorded 23 tackles, eight pass breakups and an interception.

== Professional career ==
Pre-draft measurables
Height	Weight	Arm length	Hand span	Wingspan	40-yard dash	10-yard split	20-yard split	20-yard shuttle	Three-cone drill	Vertical jump	Broad jump	Bench press
6 ft 1 1/2 in (1.87 m)	190 lb (86 kg)	31 3/4 in (0.81 m)	9 1/4 in (0.23 m)	6 ft 4 in (1.93 m)	4.45 s	1.54 s	2.56 s	4.20 s	6.82 s	33.0 in (0.84 m)	10 ft 3 in (3.12 m)	11 reps
All values from Pro Day

Prunty was selected by the New England Patriots in the fifth round (171st overall) of the 2026 NFL draft.
