= Hezekiah Masses =

American football player (born 2004)

No. 35 – Las Vegas Raiders
- Position: Cornerback
- Roster status: Active

Personal information
- Born: June 30, 2004 (age 22)
- Listed height: 6 ft 1 in (1.85 m)
- Listed weight: 185 lb (84 kg)

Career information
- High school: Deerfield Beach (Deerfield Beach, Florida)
- College: FIU (2022–2024); California (2025)
- NFL draft: 2026: 5th round, 175th overall pick

Career history
- Las Vegas Raiders (2026–present)

Awards and highlights
- First-team All-ACC (2025)

Career NFL statistics as of Week 10, 2026
- Total tackles: 33
- Pass deflections: 7
- Interceptions: 3
- Stats at Pro Football Reference

Hezekiah "Zeke" Masses (born June 30, 2004) is an American professional football cornerback for the Las Vegas Raiders of the National Football League (NFL). He played college football for the California Golden Bears and the FIU Panthers and was selected by the Raiders in the fifth round of the 2026 NFL draft.

== Early life ==
Masses attended Deerfield Beach High School in Deerfield Beach, Florida. He was rated as a three-star recruit and committed to play college football for the FIU Panthers.

== College career ==
=== FIU ===
In three years at FIU from 2022 through 2024, Masses totaled 105 tackles with four and a half being for a loss, 12 pass deflections, two interceptions, two fumble recoveries, and a forced fumble. After the 2024 season, he entered his name into the NCAA transfer portal.

=== California ===
Masses transferred to play for the California Golden Bears. In the 2025 season opener, he recorded two pass deflections and an interception in a win over Oregon State. In week 3, Masses notched eight tackles and an interception in a victory versus Minnesota. In week 5, Masses brought in an interception in a win against Boston College. For his performance during the 2025 season, he was named first-team all-ACC. Masses accepted an invite to participate in the 2026 Senior Bowl.

== Professional career ==
Pre-draft measurables
Height	Weight	Arm length	Hand span	Wingspan	40-yard dash	10-yard split	20-yard split	20-yard shuttle	Three-cone drill	Vertical jump	Broad jump
6 ft 0 5/8 in (1.84 m)	179 lb (81 kg)	31 1/8 in (0.79 m)	8 1/4 in (0.21 m)	6 ft 4 3/4 in (1.95 m)	4.46 s	1.57 s	2.64 s	4.51 s	7.31 s	31.5 in (0.80 m)	10 ft 1 in (3.07 m)
All values from NFL Combine/Pro Day

Masses was selected by the Las Vegas Raiders in the fifth round with the 175th overall pick of the 2026 NFL draft.

In his first professional start, Masses intercepted Justin Herbert twice, leading the Raiders to a 26-14 win over the Chargers. For his breakout performance, Masses was named AFC Defensive Player of the Week.
