= Logan Taylor =

Canadian gridiron football player (born 2002)

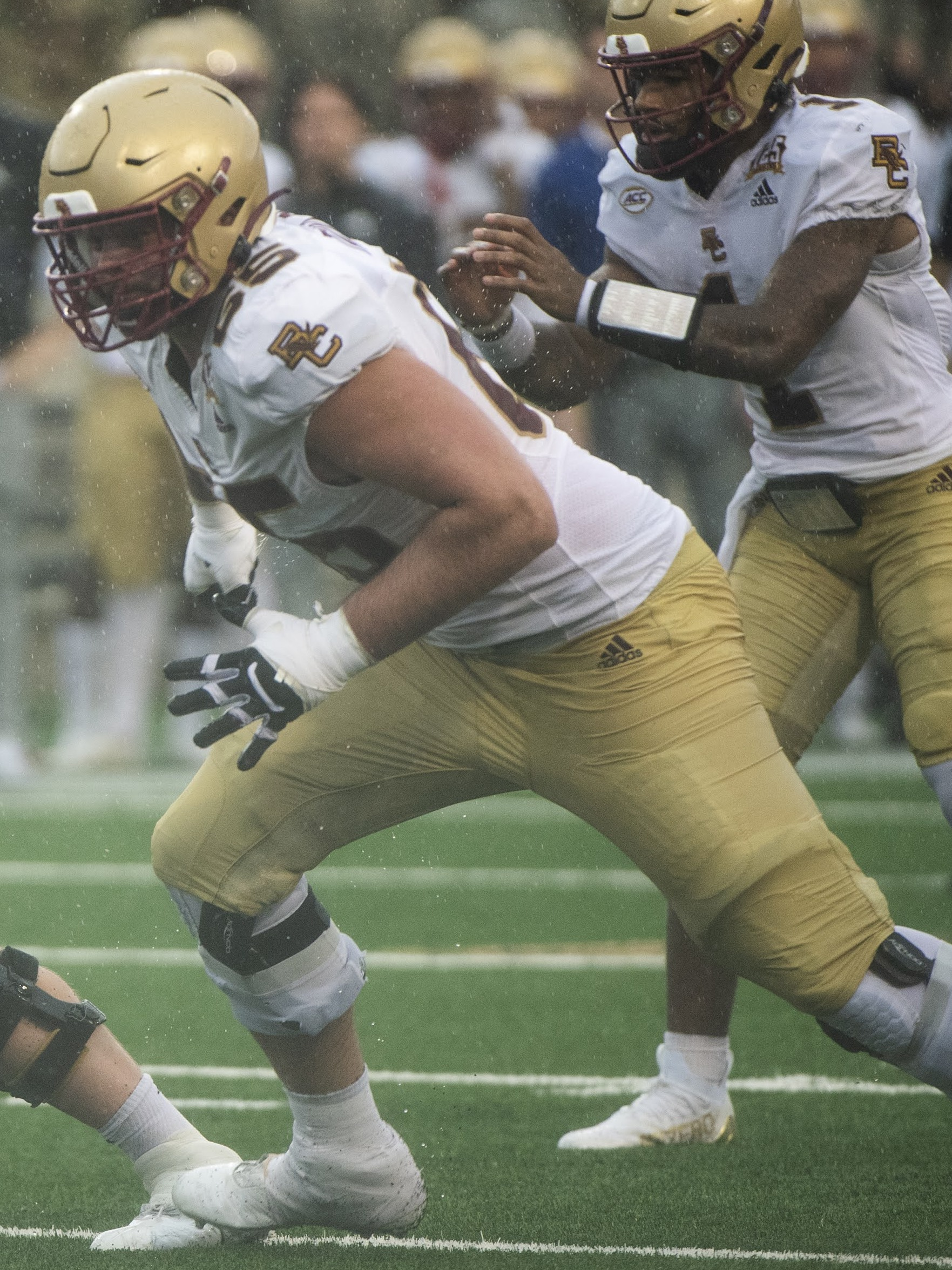
- Taylor with Boston College in 2023

No. 65 – Los Angeles Chargers
- Position: Guard
- Roster status: Active

Personal information
- Born: February 7, 2002 (age 24); Lunenburg, Nova Scotia, Canada
- Listed height: 6 ft 7 in (2.01 m)
- Listed weight: 312 lb (142 kg)

Career information
- High school: Sir John A. Macdonald High School (Upper Tantallon, Nova Scotia, Canada) Episcopal (Alexandria, Virginia, U.S.)
- College: Virginia (2021–2022); Boston College (2023–2025)
- NFL draft: 2026: 6th round, 202nd overall pick

Career history
- Los Angeles Chargers (2026–present)

Awards and highlights
- Second-team All-ACC (2025)

Career NFL statistics as of Week 4, 2026
- Games played: 2
- Stats at Pro Football Reference

Logan Taylor (born February 7, 2002) is a Canadian professional football guard for the Los Angeles Chargers of the National Football League (NFL). He played college football for the Virginia Cavaliers and Boston College Eagles and was selected by the Chargers in the sixth round of the 2026 NFL draft.

== Early life ==
Taylor was born in Lunenburg, Nova Scotia. He grew up playing soccer before being convinced to try out football by the friend of a coach. He played for the youth team Southshore Seahawks, based in Bridgewater, and scored the first touchdown in program history despite being a defensive lineman. He participated for Team Nova Scotia and won at the 2017 Under-16 Eastern Challenge and later competed at the 2018 International Bowl for the Under-16 Eastern Canadian team.

Taylor then Enrolled at Sir John A. Macdonald High School in Upper Tantallon Nova Scotia, played football and basketball, then, Taylor moved to the U.S. and enrolled at Episcopal High School in Alexandria, Virginia, for his junior year. There, he played as an offensive tackle and was named first-team all-state, honorable mention All-Met and to the Interstate Athletic Conference all-star team. Ranked a four-star prospect and one of the top-25 offensive tackles nationally, he committed to play college football for the Virginia Cavaliers.

== College career ==
Taylor appeared in two games for the Cavaliers as a true freshman in 2021 before winning a starting role in 2022, starting 10 games as an offensive tackle. In two seasons at Virginia, he allowed only four sacks. He transferred to the Boston College Eagles in 2023 and started 13 games at left tackle that year, then 11 games – 10 as a left guard and one as a left tackle – during the 2024 season. He was named honorable mention All-Atlantic Coast Conference (ACC) in both years. For his senior year in 2025, Taylor served as a team captain. In his last year, he was a starter in all 12 games and saw action at right guard, left tackle, and right tackle, earning second-team All-ACC honors from the Associated Press.

Taylor finished his stint with the Eagles having started 36 games, recording starts at four of the five positions along the offensive line in his career. He was invited to the 2026 East–West Shrine Bowl and to the 2026 Senior Bowl. Taylor was one of two Canadians invited to the Senior Bowl, along with Akheem Mesidor.

== Professional career ==
Pre-draft measurables
Height	Weight	Arm length	Hand span	Wingspan	40-yard dash	10-yard split	20-yard split	20-yard shuttle	Three-cone drill	Vertical jump	Broad jump
6 ft 6 3/4 in (2.00 m)	314 lb (142 kg)	33 7/8 in (0.86 m)	10 1/2 in (0.27 m)	6 ft 10 5/8 in (2.10 m)	5.19 s	1.82 s	3.03 s	4.84 s	7.75 s	31.0 in (0.79 m)	9 ft 0 in (2.74 m)
All values from NFL Combine

Taylor was selected by the Los Angeles Chargers in the sixth round (202nd overall) of the 2026 NFL draft. In addition to being an NFL draft prospect, he was ranked the second-best available prospect for the 2026 CFL draft by the CFL Scouting Bureau; he ultimately went undrafted in the CFL draft.
