= Kyle Louis =

American football player (born 2004)

No. 19 – Miami Dolphins
- Position: Safety
- Roster status: Active

Personal information
- Born: March 9, 2004 (age 22)
- Listed height: 6 ft 0 in (1.83 m)
- Listed weight: 225 lb (102 kg)

Career information
- High school: East Orange Campus (East Orange, New Jersey)
- College: Pittsburgh (2022–2025)
- NFL draft: 2026: 4th round, 138th overall pick

Career history
- Miami Dolphins (2026–present)

Awards and highlights
- First-team All-American (2024); First-team All-ACC (2024); Second-team All-ACC (2025)

Career NFL statistics
- Games played: 1
- Stats at Pro Football Reference

Kyle Louis (born March 9, 2004) is an American professional football linebacker/safety for the Miami Dolphins of the National Football League (NFL). He played college football for the Pittsburgh Panthers and was selected by the Dolphins in the fourth round of the 2026 NFL draft.

== Early life ==
Louis attended East Orange Campus High School in East Orange, New Jersey. As a senior he had 118 tackles, two forced fumbles and one interception. He originally committed to play college football at Temple University before switching to the University of Pittsburgh.

== College career ==
In his first year at Pittsburgh in 2022, Louis played in four games and redshirted. As a redshirt freshman in 2023, he started two of nine games and had 19 tackles. Louis took over as a full-time starter his redshirt sophomore year in 2024. Against the Syracuse Orange, he had his first career interception which he returned 59 yards for a touchdown.

== Professional career ==
Pre-draft measurables
Height	Weight	Arm length	Hand span	Wingspan	40-yard dash	10-yard split	20-yard split	20-yard shuttle	Three-cone drill	Vertical jump	Broad jump	Bench press
5 ft 11 7/8 in (1.83 m)	220 lb (100 kg)	31 1/4 in (0.79 m)	9 1/2 in (0.24 m)	6 ft 4 1/8 in (1.93 m)	4.53 s	1.58 s	2.65 s	4.26 s	6.97 s	39.5 in (1.00 m)	10 ft 9 in (3.28 m)	20 reps
All values from NFL Combine/Pro Day

Louis was selected by the Miami Dolphins in the fourth round with the 138th overall pick of the 2026 NFL draft. On September 16, Louis was placed on injured reserve after suffering an MCL sprain. He was activated on October 24.
