= Avieon Terrell =

American football player (born 2005)

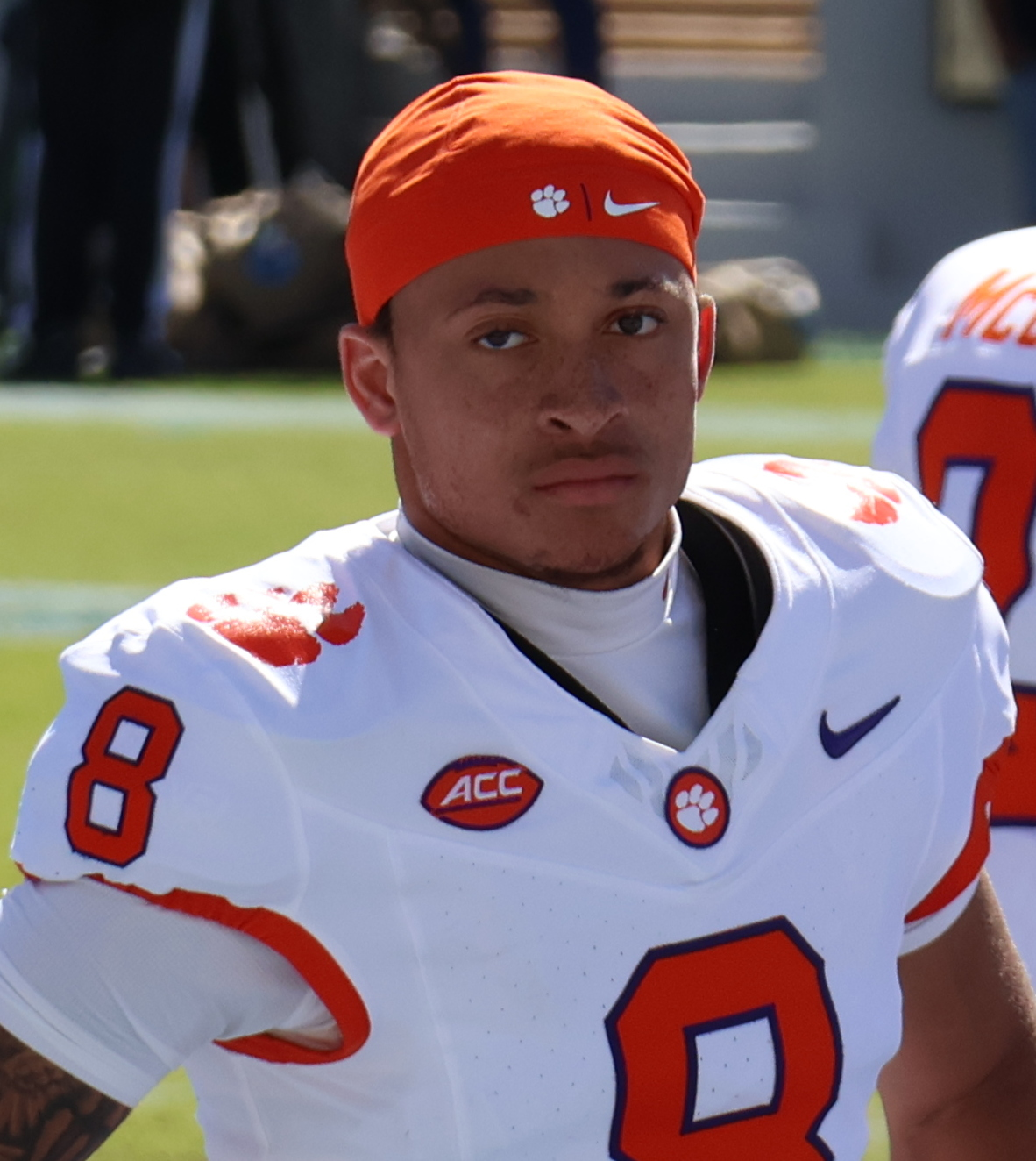
- Terrell with the Clemson Tigers in 2025

No. 12 – Atlanta Falcons
- Position: Cornerback
- Roster status: Active

Personal information
- Born: January 11, 2005 (age 21); Atlanta, Georgia, U.S.
- Listed height: 5 ft 11 in (1.80 m)
- Listed weight: 186 lb (84 kg)

Career information
- High school: Westlake (Atlanta)
- College: Clemson (2023–2025)
- NFL draft: 2026: 2nd round, 48th overall pick

Career history
- Atlanta Falcons (2026–present)

Awards and highlights
- First-team All-ACC (2025); Second-team All-ACC (2024)

Career NFL statistics as of Week 8, 2026
- Total tackles: 12
- Stats at Pro Football Reference

Avieon Terrell (born January 11, 2005) is an American professional football cornerback for the Atlanta Falcons of the National Football League (NFL). He played college football for the Clemson Tigers and was selected by the Falcons in the second round of the 2026 NFL draft.

== Early life ==
Terrell attended Westlake High School in Atlanta, Georgia. He played cornerback and wide receiver in high school. During his career he had 86 tackles and six interceptions. He committed to Clemson University to play college football.

== College career ==
As a true freshman at Clemson in 2023, Terrell played in 13 games with five starts and had 18 tackles and one interception. He returned to Clemson as a starter his sophomore year in 2024.

=== College statistics ===
Year	Team	Class	GP	Tackles					Interceptions					Fumbles	
Year	Team	Class	GP	Solo	Ast	Tot	Loss	Sk	Int	Yds	Avg	TD	PD	FF	FR
2023	Clemson	FR	13	15	4	19	0.0	0.0	1	0	0.0	0	4	0	0
2024	Clemson	SO	14	45	13	58	4.5	1.0	2	9	4.5	0	12	3	2
2025	Clemson	JR	12	30	18	48	4.5	3.0	0	0	—	0	9	5	1
Career			39	90	35	125	9.0	4.0	3	9	3.0	0	25	8	3

== Professional career ==
Pre-draft measurables
Height	Weight	Arm length	Hand span	Wingspan	40-yard dash	10-yard split	20-yard split	Vertical jump	Broad jump	Bench press
5 ft 10 3/4 in (1.80 m)	186 lb (84 kg)	31 in (0.79 m)	8 5/8 in (0.22 m)	6 ft 3 1/2 in (1.92 m)	4.67 s	1.59 s	2.70 s	34.0 in (0.86 m)	10 ft 3 in (3.12 m)	17 reps
All values from NFL Combine/Pro Day

Terrell was selected by the Atlanta Falcons in the second round with the 48th overall pick in the 2026 NFL draft.

== Personal life ==
Terrell's older brother is fellow Atlanta Falcons teammate A. J. Terrell, who also played college football at Clemson.
