= Melkart Abou Jaoude =

American football player

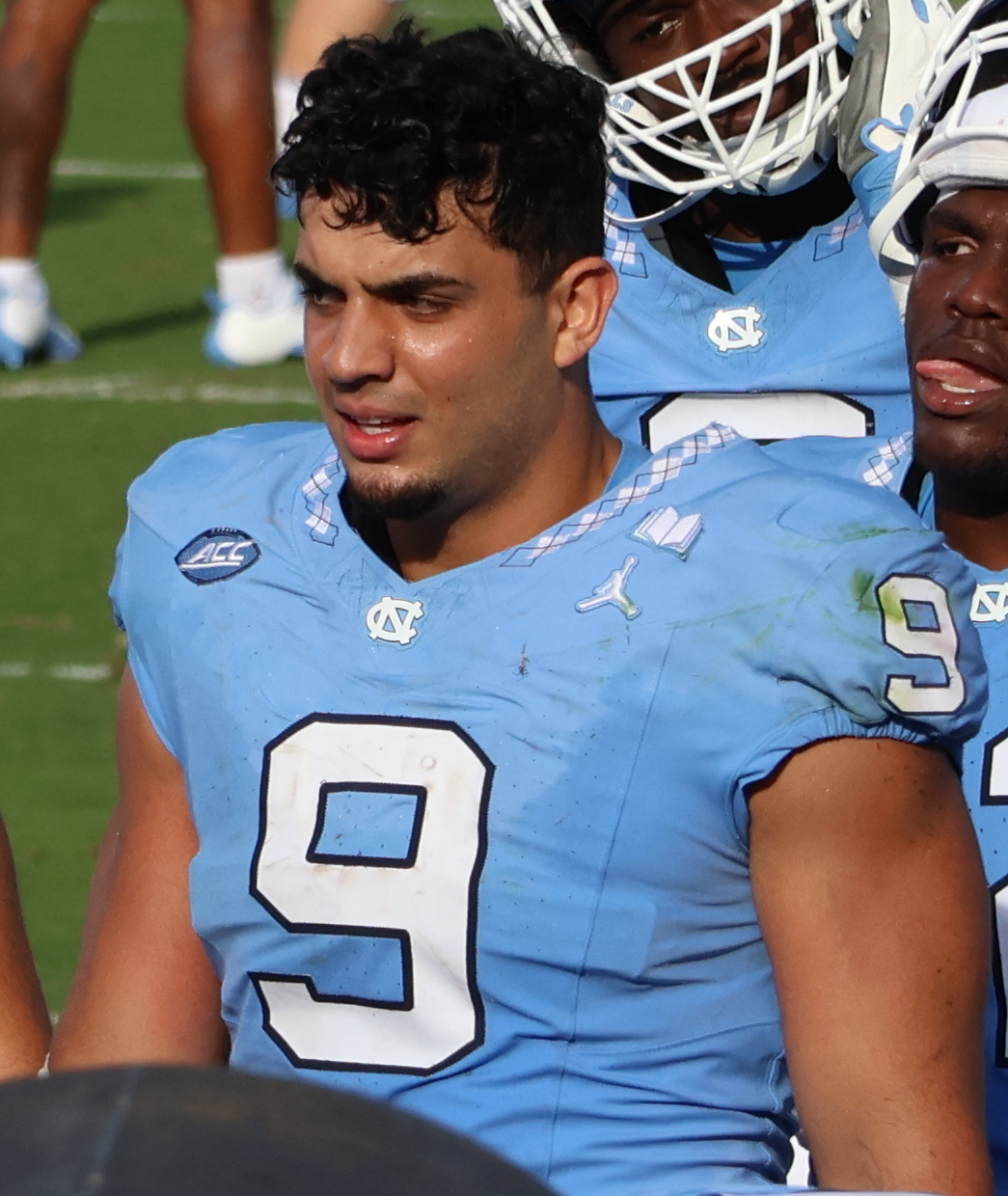
- Abou Jaoude in 2025

No. 9 – North Carolina Tar Heels
- Position: Defensive end
- Class: (redshirt) Junior

Personal information
- Born: Lebanon
- Listed height: 6 ft 5 in (1.96 m)
- Listed weight: 260 lb (118 kg)

Career information
- High school: Newton (Newton, New Jersey)
- College: Delaware (2022–2024); North Carolina (2025–present)

Awards and highlights
- Second-team All-ACC (2025)
- Stats at ESPN

Melkart Abou Jaoude (Aboo-JOW-day) is a Lebanese-born American college football defensive end for the North Carolina Tar Heels. He previously played for the Delaware Fightin' Blue Hens.

== Early life ==
Abou Jaoude was born in Lebanon and moved to the United States with his family when he was three. He attended Newton High School in Newton, New Jersey, where he played football and wrestling. During his senior year, Abou Jaoude had 18 receptions for 440 yards and 9 touchdowns at tight end while also having 9 tackles-for-loss as a defensive lineman. Abou Jaoude also performed well in wrestling, qualifying for a place in the state championship.

=== Recruitment ===
Despite his success in his senior year of high school, Abou Jaoude only received football offers from Division II and Division III schools, with him considering either playing at a junior college or seeking another career path altogether. Abou Jaoude's first Division I offer came from former Delaware wide receiver G. J. Crescione at the bagel store where he had worked since he was a freshman. Crescione had been sent Abou Jaoude's highlights by the store's owner and Crescione's friend, Kristian Vozza, with Crescione then sending those highlights to head coach Ryan Carty, culminating in Abou Jaoude being offered to walk-on to the Delaware football team.

== College career ==
=== Delaware ===
Abou Jaoude redshirted his freshman year, only appearing in one game. He was awarded a scholarship in 2023 and received more playing time, appearing in thirteen games and starting two of them, with him also recording 5 tackles for loss and 2 sacks on the season. In his final year at Delaware, Abou Jaoude started all eleven games he played in, recording 6.5 sacks along with 9.5 tackles for loss, earning All-CAA Football honorable mention.

=== North Carolina ===
On December 17, 2024, Abou Jaoude announced his intention to transfer to the University of North Carolina at Chapel Hill to continue playing football. In week 3 against Richmond, Abou Jaoude registered two sacks along with a fumble recovery. Against Virginia in week 9, Abou Jaoude had 3 sacks. The following week, he had 2 sacks and a forced fumble in a win against Syracuse, for which he was named ACC Defensive Lineman of the Week. Abou Jaoude followed that performance with another 3-sack game the following week, this time against Stanford. Following the season, Abou Jaoude was awarded a selection to the All-ACC second team.

Abou Jaoude re-signed with North Carolina shortly after the 2025 season to continue playing football for the team in 2026. Before the season, Abou Jaoude was named on the watchlist for the Bronko Nagurski Trophy and the Chuck Bednarik Award. Abou Jaoude did not appear in weeks 2 or 3 due to a hand injury he sustained in the first game of the year against TCU.
