= T. J. Parker (American football) =

American football player (born 2004)

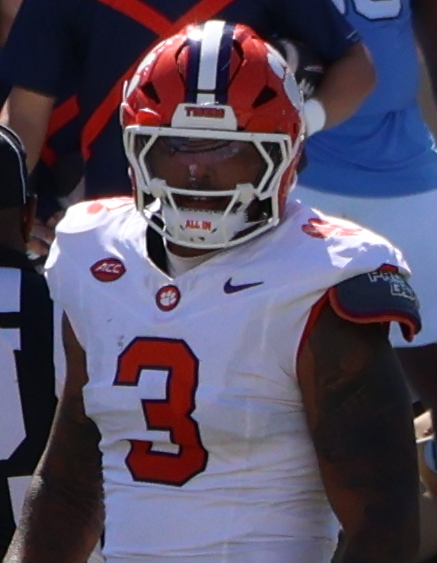
- Parker with the Clemson Tigers in 2025

No. 99 – Buffalo Bills
- Position: Outside linebacker
- Roster status: Active

Personal information
- Born: September 19, 2004 (age 22); Knoxville, Tennessee, U.S.
- Listed height: 6 ft 4 in (1.93 m)
- Listed weight: 263 lb (119 kg)

Career information
- High school: Central High School (Phenix City, Alabama)
- College: Clemson (2023–2025)
- NFL draft: 2026: 2nd round, 35th overall pick

Career history
- Buffalo Bills (2026–present)

Awards and highlights
- Second-team All-ACC (2024); Freshman All-American (2023)

Career NFL statistics as of Week 11, 2026
- Tackles: 28
- Sacks: 3.5
- Forced fumbles: 1
- Stats at Pro Football Reference

Tomarrion Jamar Parker (born September 19, 2004) is an American professional football outside linebacker for the Buffalo Bills of the National Football League (NFL). He played college football for the Clemson Tigers and was selected by the Bills in the second round of the 2026 NFL draft.

== Early life ==
Parker was born on September 19, 2004 in Knoxville, Tennessee. An army brat, Parker moved several times growing up before his family settled in Phenix City, Alabama. Parker attended Central High School in Phenix City where he played under Patrick Nix, the father of Denver Broncos quarterback Bo Nix. As a senior he had 63 tackles and 12 sacks. Parker was selected to play in the 2023 All-American Bowl. A four star prospect, he originally committed to Penn State University to play college football before changing to Clemson University.

== College career ==
Parker earned immediate playing time his true freshman year at Clemson in 2023. He recorded his first career sack in his second game against the Florida Atlantic Owls.

=== Statistics ===
College statistics
Year	Team	Games	Tackles				
Year	Team	Games	Total	Solo	Ast	TFL	Sacks
2023	Clemson	13	32	17	15	12.5	5.5
2024	Clemson	14	57	35	22	19.5	11.0
2025	Clemson	12	37	19	19	9.5	5.0
Career		39	126	71	55	41.5	21.5

== Professional career ==
Pre-draft measurables
Height	Weight	Arm length	Hand span	Wingspan	40-yard dash	10-yard split	20-yard split	Vertical jump	Broad jump
6 ft 3 5/8 in (1.92 m)	263 lb (119 kg)	33 1/8 in (0.84 m)	9 1/2 in (0.24 m)	6 ft 7 in (2.01 m)	4.68 s	1.61 s	2.72 s	34.0 in (0.86 m)	10 ft 0 in (3.05 m)
All values from NFL Combine

Parker was selected by the Buffalo Bills with the 35th overall pick in the second round of the 2026 NFL draft.
