= Jacarrius Peak =

American football player

No. 65 – South Carolina Gamecocks
- Position: Offensive tackle
- Class: Redshirt Senior

Personal information
- Listed height: 6 ft 4 in (1.93 m)
- Listed weight: 305 lb (138 kg)

Career information
- High school: Valdosta (Valdosta, Georgia)
- College: NC State (2022–2025); South Carolina (2026–present)
- Stats at ESPN

Jacarrius Peak is an American college football offensive tackle for the South Carolina Gamecocks. He previously played for the NC State Wolfpack.

== Early life ==
Peak is from Valdosta, Georgia, and attended Valdosta High School, where he competed in football, basketball, and track and field. In football, he was an offensive guard and tackle, helping his school to the Georgia 6A state semifinals as a junior before the team went 4–6 when he was a senior. Ranked a three-star recruit, he committed to play college football for the NC State Wolfpack.

== College career ==
Peak redshirted as a true freshman at NC State in 2022. During the 2023 season, he became a starting tackle for the Wolfpack. Peak appeared in 12 of 13 games in 2023, six as a starter, and then started all 13 games in 2024. He started every game again in 2025, allowing only three sacks while receiving honorable mention All-Atlantic Coast Conference (ACC) honors.

Peak entered the NCAA transfer portal after the season and was ranked by On3.com as the sixth-best player in the portal, as well as the best offensive tackle. He transferred to the South Carolina Gamecocks for his final season in 2026. He missed the start of the season due to an injury suffered in a basketball tournament.
