= Darrell Jackson Jr. =

American football player (born 2003)

No. 95 – New York Jets
- Position: Defensive tackle
- Roster status: Active

Personal information
- Born: April 28, 2003 (age 23); Tallahassee, Florida, U.S.
- Listed height: 6 ft 5 in (1.96 m)
- Listed weight: 315 lb (143 kg)

Career information
- High school: Gadsden County (Havana, Florida)
- College: Maryland (2021); Miami (FL) (2022); Florida State (2023–2025)
- NFL draft: 2026: 4th round, 103rd overall pick

Career history
- New York Jets (2026–present)

Career NFL statistics as of Week 4, 2026
- Tackles: 8
- Stats at Pro Football Reference

Darrell Jackson Jr. (born April 28, 2003) is an American professional football defensive tackle for the New York Jets of the National Football League (NFL). He played college football for the Florida State Seminoles, Maryland Terrapins and Miami Hurricanes. Jackson was selected by the Jets in the fourth round of the 2026 NFL draft.

== Early life ==
Jackson Jr. attended Gadsden County High School in Havana, Florida. He played defensive tackle, defensive end and tight end in high school. He committed to the University of Maryland, College Park to play college football.

== College career ==
As a true freshman at Maryland in 2021, Jackson Jr. played in all 13 games with one start and had 22 tackles. After one year at Maryland, he transferred to the University of Miami. In his lone year at Miami, he started all 12 games and had 27 tackles and three sacks. After the season, Jackson Jr. transferred to Florida State University. He was forced to sit out the season by the NCAA after he was denied a hardship waiver request, but was eligible to play in a bowl game. His only game of the season came in the 2023 Orange Bowl, where he recorded six tackles. Jackson Jr. returned to Florida State in 2024.

== Professional career ==
Pre-draft measurables
Height	Weight	Arm length	Hand span	Wingspan	Vertical jump
6 ft 5 1/2 in (1.97 m)	315 lb (143 kg)	34 3/4 in (0.88 m)	11 in (0.28 m)	7 ft 2 in (2.18 m)	26.5 in (0.67 m)
All values from NFL Combine/Pro Day

Jackson was selected by the New York Jets in the fourth round with the 103rd overall pick in the 2026 NFL draft.

== Personal life ==
Jackson's uncle, Dexter, played 10 seasons in the NFL, and won Super Bowl MVP in Super Bowl XXXVII with the Tampa Bay Buccaneers.
