= Terry Moore (American football) =

American football player (born 2004)

No. 11 – Ohio State Buckeyes
- Position: Safety
- Class: Redshirt Senior

Personal information
- Born: January 22, 2004 (age 22); Washington, North Carolina
- Listed height: 6 ft 0 in (1.83 m)
- Listed weight: 200 lb (91 kg)

Career information
- High school: Washington High School; (Washington, North Carolina)
- College: Duke (2022–2025); Ohio State (2026–present)

Awards and highlights
- Second-team All-ACC (2024)
- Stats at ESPN

Terry Moore (born January 22, 2004) is an American college football safety for the Ohio State. He previously played for the Duke Blue Devils.

== Early life ==
Moore grew up in Washington, North Carolina and attended Washington High School, where he had a stellar career as a rusher. In two seasons, he amassed 4,935 yards and helped his team to a 26-9 record and three state playoff appearances. He was a three-star prospect and the No. 26 player in North Carolina, according to 247Sports.com. He also earned back-to-back offensive player of the year and First Team All-State honors. He chose to play college football at Duke over offers from several other schools.

== College career ==
Moore enrolled early at Duke in January 2022. During the 2022 season as a true freshman, Moore played as a running back in eight games and finished the season with 29 totaled rushes for 128 yards and four receptions for 26 yards. During the 2022 Military Bowl he made one kick return for 22 yards.

During the 2023 season, he transitioned from being a running back to a safety during spring practice.
