= 2024 Clemson Tigers football team =

American college football season

2024 Clemson Tigers football

ACC champion

ACC Championship Game, W 34–31 vs. SMU

CFP First Round, L 24–38 at Texas
- Conference: Atlantic Coast Conference

Ranking
- Coaches: No. 11т
- AP: No. 14
- Record: 10–4 (7–1 ACC)
- Head coach: Dabo Swinney (16th full, 17th overall season)
- Offensive coordinator: Garrett Riley (2nd season)
- Offensive scheme: Dirt raid
- Defensive coordinator: Wes Goodwin (3rd season)
- Co-defensive coordinator: Mickey Conn (3rd season)
- Base defense: 4–3 / 4–2–5 hybrid
- Home stadium: Memorial Stadium

Uniform
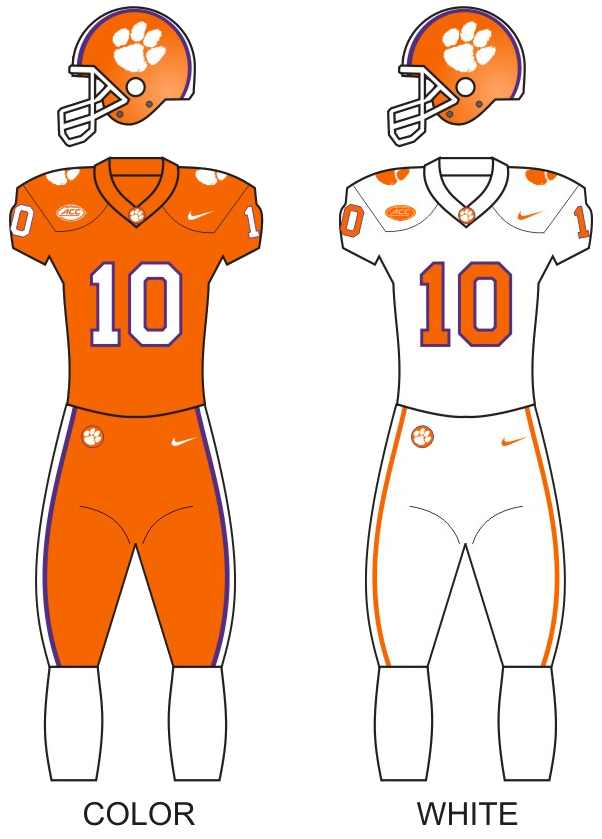

2024 Atlantic Coast Conference football standings
	Conf.			Overall
Team	W		L	W		L
No. 12 SMU y^	8	–	0	11	–	3
No. 14 Clemson y$^	7	–	1	10	–	4
No. 18 Miami (FL)	6	–	2	10	–	3
No. 20 Syracuse	5	–	3	10	–	3
Duke	5	–	3	9	–	4
Louisville	5	–	3	9	–	4
Georgia Tech	5	–	3	7	–	6
Boston College	4	–	4	7	–	6
Virginia Tech	4	–	4	6	–	7
Pittsburgh	3	–	5	7	–	6
NC State	3	–	5	6	–	7
North Carolina	3	–	5	6	–	7
Virginia	3	–	5	5	–	7
California	2	–	6	6	–	7
Wake Forest	2	–	6	4	–	8
Stanford	2	–	6	3	–	9
Florida State	1	–	7	2	–	10
Championship: Clemson 34, SMU 31
^ – College Football Playoff participant; $ – Conference champion; y – Championship game participant; Rankings from AP Poll

The 2024 Clemson Tigers football team represented Clemson University as a member of the Atlantic Coast Conference (ACC) during the 2024 NCAA Division I FBS football season. The Tigers were led by Dabo Swinney, in his 17th year and 16th full season as Clemson's head coach.

== Schedule ==
Date	Time	Opponent	Rank	Site	TV	Result	Attendance
August 31	12:00 p.m.	vs. No. 1 Georgia*	No. 14	Mercedes-Benz Stadium; Atlanta, GA (Aflac Kickoff Game, rivalry)	ABC	L 3–34	78,827
September 7	8:00 p.m.	Appalachian State*	No. 25	Memorial Stadium; Clemson, SC	ACCN	W 66–20	81,500
September 21	12:00 p.m.	NC State	No. 21	Memorial Stadium; Clemson, SC (Textile Bowl)	ABC	W 59–35	81,500
September 28	7:00 p.m.	Stanford^{†}	No. 17	Memorial Stadium; Clemson, SC	ESPN	W 40–14	80,295
October 5	7:00 p.m.	at Florida State	No. 15	Doak Campbell Stadium; Tallahassee, FL (rivalry)	ESPN	W 29–13	55,107
October 12	12:00 p.m.	at Wake Forest	No. 10	Allegacy Federal Credit Union Stadium; Winston-Salem, NC	ESPN	W 49–14	31,553
October 19	12:00 p.m.	Virginia	No. 10	Memorial Stadium; Clemson, SC	ACCN	W 48–31	80,100
November 2	7:30 p.m.	Louisville	No. 11т	Memorial Stadium; Clemson, SC	ESPN	L 21–33	80,446
November 9	3:30 p.m.	at Virginia Tech	No. 23	Lane Stadium; Blacksburg, VA	ESPN	W 24–14	65,632
November 16	12:00 p.m.	at Pittsburgh	No. 20	Acrisure Stadium; Pittsburgh, PA	ESPN	W 24–20	58,667
November 23	3:30 p.m.	The Citadel*	No. 17	Memorial Stadium; Clemson, SC	The CW	W 51–14	80,300
November 30	12:00 p.m.	No. 15 South Carolina*	No. 12	Memorial Stadium; Clemson, SC (rivalry)	ESPN	L 14–17	81,500
December 7	8:00 p.m.	vs. No. 8 SMU	No. 17	Bank of America Stadium; Charlotte, NC (ACC Championship Game)	ABC	W 34–31	53,808
December 21	4:00 p.m.	at (5) No. 3 Texas*	(12) No. 16	Darrell K Royal–Texas Memorial Stadium; Austin, TX (CFP First Round)	TNT	L 24–38	101,150
*Non-conference game; ^{†}Homecoming; Rankings from AP Poll (and CFP Rankings, after November 5) - Released prior to game; All times are in Eastern time

== Offseason ==
=== Recruiting ===
Clemson's 2024 class consisted of 22 signees. The class was ranked second in the ACC and tenth best overall by the 247Sports Composite.

College recruiting (2024)
Name	Hometown	School	Height	Weight	Commit date
Christian Bentancur; TE	Woodstock, Illinois	Marian Central Catholic	6 ft 5 in (1.96 m)	240 lb (110 kg)	Jan 13, 2023
Christian Bentancur; TE	Recruit ratings: Rivals: 247Sports: ESPN: (83)				
Sammy Brown; LB	Jefferson, Georgia	Jefferson	6 ft 2 in (1.88 m)	230 lb (100 kg)	Jun 5, 2023
Sammy Brown; LB	Recruit ratings: Rivals: 247Sports: ESPN: (5)				
Hevin Brown-Shuler; DT	Atlanta, Georgia	Pace	6 ft 4 in (1.93 m)	295 lb (134 kg)	Apr 23, 2023
Hevin Brown-Shuler; DT	Recruit ratings: Rivals: 247Sports: ESPN: (80)				
Noah Dixon; S	LaGrange, Georgia	Troup County	6 ft 1 in (1.85 m)	185 lb (84 kg)	Jan 30, 2023
Noah Dixon; S	Recruit ratings: Rivals: 247Sports: ESPN: (81)				
David Eziomume; RB	Kennesaw, Georgia	North Cobb	6 ft 0 in (1.83 m)	200 lb (91 kg)	Mar 1, 2023
David Eziomume; RB	Recruit ratings: Rivals: 247Sports: ESPN: (79)				
Tavoy Feagin; CB	Tampa, Florida	Carrollwood Day	6 ft 0 in (1.83 m)	175 lb (79 kg)	Nov 20, 2022
Tavoy Feagin; CB	Recruit ratings: Rivals: 247Sports: ESPN: (81)				
Corian Gipson; S	Lancaster, Texas	Lancaster	6 ft 0 in (1.83 m)	170 lb (77 kg)	Jul 22, 2023
Corian Gipson; S	Recruit ratings: Rivals: 247Sports: ESPN: (84)				
Ashton Hampton; S	Tallahassee, Florida	Florida State University School	6 ft 2 in (1.88 m)	180 lb (82 kg)	Jul 15, 2023
Ashton Hampton; S	Recruit ratings: Rivals: 247Sports: ESPN: (78)				
Nolan Hauser; K	Cornelius, North Carolina	Hough	6 ft 1 in (1.85 m)	185 lb (84 kg)	Nov 28, 2022
Nolan Hauser; K	Recruit ratings: Rivals: 247Sports: ESPN: (75)				
Ricardo Jones; S	Warner Robins, Georgia	Northside	6 ft 3 in (1.91 m)	200 lb (91 kg)	Jun 27, 2023
Ricardo Jones; S	Recruit ratings: Rivals: 247Sports: ESPN: (82)				
Adam Kissayi (Note: Kissayi enrolled early at Clemson and transferred to Minnesota prior to the 2024 season.); DE	Palm Bay, Florida	Heritage	6 ft 8 in (2.03 m)	230 lb (100 kg)	Jul 14, 2023
Adam Kissayi; DE	Recruit ratings: Rivals: 247Sports: ESPN: (77)				
C.J. Kubah-Taylor; LB	Olney, Maryland	Our Lady of Good Counsel	6 ft 3 in (1.91 m)	225 lb (102 kg)	Dec 19, 2023
C.J. Kubah-Taylor; LB	Recruit ratings: Rivals: 247Sports: ESPN: (76)				
Darien Mayo; DE	Olney, Maryland	Our Lady of Good Counsel	6 ft 8 in (2.03 m)	250 lb (110 kg)	Jun 22, 2023
Darien Mayo; DE	Recruit ratings: Rivals: 247Sports: ESPN: (80)				
T. J. Moore; WR	Tampa, Florida	Tampa Catholic	6 ft 3 in (1.91 m)	190 lb (86 kg)	Jun 6, 2023
T. J. Moore; WR	Recruit ratings: Rivals: 247Sports: ESPN: (86)				
Ronan O'Connell; OT	Franklin, Tennessee	Page	6 ft 5 in (1.96 m)	285 lb (129 kg)	Jul 4, 2023
Ronan O'Connell; OT	Recruit ratings: Rivals: 247Sports: ESPN: (79)				
Champ Thompson; DT	Norcross, Georgia	Meadowcreek	6 ft 3 in (1.91 m)	260 lb (120 kg)	Jan 28, 2023
Champ Thompson; DT	Recruit ratings: Rivals: 247Sports: ESPN: (80)				
Elyjah Thurmon; OG	Hinesville, Georgia	Bradwell Institute	6 ft 4 in (1.93 m)	265 lb (120 kg)	Dec 20, 2023
Elyjah Thurmon; OG	Recruit ratings: Rivals: 247Sports: ESPN: (81)				
Mason Wade; OT	Purcellville, Virginia	Loudoun Valley	6 ft 5 in (1.96 m)	290 lb (130 kg)	Dec 20, 2023
Mason Wade; OT	Recruit ratings: Rivals: 247Sports: ESPN: (76)				
Bryant Wesco; WR	Midlothian, Texas	Midlothian	6 ft 2 in (1.88 m)	175 lb (79 kg)	Jun 6, 2023
Bryant Wesco; WR	Recruit ratings: Rivals: 247Sports: ESPN: (88)				
Joe Wilkerson; LB	Rome, Georgia	Rome	6 ft 1 in (1.85 m)	185 lb (84 kg)	Dec 19, 2023
Joe Wilkerson; LB	Recruit ratings: Rivals: 247Sports: ESPN: (76)				
Drew Woodaz; LB	Tampa, Florida	Jesuit	6 ft 1 in (1.85 m)	185 lb (84 kg)	Apr 20, 2023
Drew Woodaz; LB	Recruit ratings: Rivals: 247Sports: ESPN: (76)				
Watson Young; OG	Central, South Carolina	D. W. Daniel	6 ft 3 in (1.91 m)	280 lb (130 kg)	Dec 3, 2023
Watson Young; OG	Recruit ratings: Rivals: 247Sports: ESPN: (77)				
Overall recruit ranking: Rivals: 11 247Sports: 11 ESPN: 15
Note: In many cases, Scout, Rivals, 247Sports, On3, and ESPN may conflict in their listings of height and weight.; In these cases, the average was taken. ESPN grades are on a 100-point scale.; Sources: "Rivals commits". Rivals.; "ESPN commits". ESPN.; "2024 Team Ranking". Rivals.com.; "247Sports commits". 247Sports.

=== Players leaving for NFL ===
==== NFL draftees ====
The Tigers had six players selected in the 2024 NFL draft.

Round	Pick	Player	Position	NFL club
1	30	Nate Wiggins	CB	Baltimore Ravens
2	35	Ruke Orhorhoro	DT	Atlanta Falcons
4	127	Will Shipley	RB	Philadelphia Eagles
5	138	Xavier Thomas	DE	Arizona Cardinals
5	155	Jeremiah Trotter Jr.	LB	Philadelphia Eagles
6	196	Tyler Davis	DT	Los Angeles Rams

==== Undrafted free agents ====
Player	Position	NFL club	Reference
Will Putnam	C	Las Vegas Raiders	
Sheridan Jones	CB	Buffalo Bills	
Jayln Phillips	S	Los Angeles Chargers	

=== Transfers ===
==== Players leaving ====
Players leaving
Name	Number	Pos.	Height	Weight	Year	Hometown	College transferred to	Source(s)
Andrew Mukuba	1	S	6'0"	195	Junior	Austin, TX	Texas	
Sage Ennis	11	TE	6'4"	240	(redshirt) Junior	Graceville, FL	Virginia (Note: Originally committed to Florida A&M.)	
Brannon Spector	13	WR	6'1"	205	(redshirt) Senior	Calhoun, GA	Jacksonville State	
Hunter Helms	18	QB	6'2"	210	(redshirt) Junior	West Columbia, SC	Rhode Island	
Domonique Thomas	20	RB	5'8"	210	(redshirt) Junior	Ohatchee, AL	Ole Miss (Note: Originally committed to Georgia State.)	
Toriano Pride	23	CB	5'11"	190	Sophomore	St. Louis, MO	Missouri	
Lannden Zanders	36	S	6'1"	189	(redshirt) Senior	Shelby, NC	TBD	
David Ojiegbe	42	DE	6'3"	240	Freshman	Largo, MD	Pittsburgh	
Jaden Kinard	46	S	5'10"	185	(redshirt) Freshman	Pawleys Island, SC	TBD	
Zack Owens	72	OL	6'6"	375	(redshirt) Freshman	Covington, Georgia	Colorado	
Mitchell Mayes	77	OL	6'3"	305	Senior	Raleigh, NC	Charlotte	
Beaux Collins	80	WR	6'3"	210	Junior	Los Angeles, CA	Notre Dame	

==== Post-season Transfers ====
The following players entered the transfer portal during the designated 45 day window after championship selections are made.

Postseason transfers
Name	Number	Pos.	Height	Weight	Year	Hometown	College transferred to	Source(s)
Noble Johnson	3	WR	6'2"	210	(redshirt) Freshman	Rockwall, Texas	Arizona State	
Sherrod Covil Jr.	5	S	5'11"	200	Junior	Chesapeake, Virginia	Virginia Tech	
Tré Williams	8	DT	6'2"	315	(redshirt) Senior	Windsor, Connecticut	Michigan	
Troy Stellato	10	WR	6'1"	190	(redshirt) Junior	Fort Lauderdale, Florida	Kentucky	
Jackson Crosby	82	WR	5'10"	190	(redshirt) Junior	Six Mile, South Carolina	East Tennessee State	
A.J. Hoffler	99	DE	6'4"	250	Sophomore	Stuart, Florida	Georgia Tech	

== Preseason ==
Listed in the order that they were released

Award	Player	Position	Year
Lott Trophy	Barrett Carter	LB	SR
Dodd Trophy	Dabo Swinney	Head coach	
Maxwell Award	Cade Klubnik	QB	JR
Maxwell Award	Phil Mafah	RB	SR
Patrick Mannelly Award	Philip Florenzo	LS	SR
Bronko Nagurski Trophy	Peter Woods	DE	SO
Outland Trophy	Blake Miller	OT	JR
Wuerffel Trophy	Barrett Carter	LB	SR
Doak Walker Award	Phil Mafah	RB	SR
Davey O'Brien Award	Cade Klubnik	QB	JR

Award	Player	Position	Year
John Mackey Award	Jake Briningstool	TE	SR
Bednarik Award	Barrett Carter	LB	SR
Bednarik Award	Peter Woods	DT	SO
Butkus Award	Barrett Carter	LB	SR
Lombardi Award	Barrett Carter	LB	SR
Lombardi Award	Blake Miller	OT	JR
Lombardi Award	Peter Woods	DT	SO
Manning Award	Cade Klubnik	QB	JR
Johnny Unitas Golden Arm Award	Cade Klubnik	QB	JR
Earl Campbell Tyler Rose Award	Cade Klubnik	QB	JR

== Personnel ==
=== Coaching staff ===
Clemson Tigers football current coaching staff
Name	Position	Alma mater	Years at Clemson
Dabo Swinney	Head coach	University of Alabama (1993)	17th
Nick Eason	Associate head coach/defensive run game coordinator/defensive tackles coach	Clemson University (2001)	3rd
Mike Reed	Assistant head coach/special teams coordinator/cornerbacks coach	Boston College (1994)	12th
Mickey Conn	Assistant coach/co-defensive coordinator/safeties coach	University of Alabama (1995)	9th
Wes Goodwin	Assistant coach/defensive coordinator/linebackers coach	Mississippi State University (2009)	13th
Tyler Grisham	Assistant coach/recruiting coordinator/wide receivers coach	Clemson University (2009)	5th
Kyle Richardson	Assistant coach/passing game coordinator/tight ends coach	Appalachian State University (2001)	9th
Garrett Riley	Assistant coach/offensive coordinator/quarterbacks coach	Texas Tech (2012)	2nd
Matt Luke	Assistant coach/offensive linemen coach	Ole Miss (1998)	1st
Chris Rumph	Assistant coach/defensive ends coach	University of South Carolina (1996)	1st
C. J. Spiller	Assistant coach/running backs coach	Clemson University (2009)	4th

=== Roster ===
As of July 16, 2024

2024 Clemson Tigers Football
Quarterbacks: 2 Cade Klubnik – junior (6'2, 205); 14 Trent Pearman – (redshirt) sophomore (6'0, 190); 16 Ethan Anderson – freshman (6'2, 180); 17 Christopher Vizzina – (redshirt) freshman (6'4, 210); Running backs: 7 Phil Mafah – senior (6'1, 230); 19 Keith Adams Jr. – (redshirt) sophomore (5'9, 215); 21 Jarvis Green – (redshirt) freshman (5'9, 200); 23 Peyton Streko – (redshirt) freshman (5'10, 180); 24 David Eziomume – freshman (6'1, 210); 26 Jay Haynes – (redshirt) freshman (5'11, 185); 31 Tristen Rigby – (redshirt) junior (5'10, 205); 32 Wise Segars Jr. – (redshirt) junior (6'1, 205); 34 Kevin McNeal – (redshirt) junior (5'9, 200); Wide receivers: 0 Antonio Williams – (redshirt) sophomore (5'11, 195); 1 T. J. Moore – freshman (6'3, 190); 3 Noble Johnson – (redshirt) freshman (6'2, 210); 6 Tyler Brown – sophomore (5'11, 180); 8 Adam Randall – junior (6'2, 225); 10 Troy Stellato – (redshirt) junior (6'1, 190); 12 Bryant Wesco – freshman (6'2, 170); 13 Parker Fulghum – freshman (6'1, 190); 18 Misun Kelley – WR/DB – (redshirt) freshman (5'10, 180); 20 Clark Sanderson – freshman (5'10, 165); 22 Cole Turner – (redshirt) sophomore (6'1, 185); 29 Chase Byrd – freshman (5'11, 180); 82 Jackson Crosby – (redshirt) junior (5'10, 190); 83 Hampton Earle – graduate student (5'10, 195); 85 Charlie Johnson – (redshirt) freshman (6'4, 200); 86 Tristan Martinez – (redshirt) freshman (5'9, 180); 88 Clay Swinney – (redshirt) sophomore (5'10, 175); 89 Zach Jackson – (redshirt) junior (6'3, 205); Tight ends: 5 Josh Sapp – (redshirt) sophomore (6'1, 235); 9 Jake Briningstool – senior (6'6, 230); 11 Olsen Patt-Henry – sophomore (6'3, 240); 35 Colby Shaw – (redshirt) freshman (6'4, 215); 44 Banks Pope – (redshirt) junior (6'4, 240); 84 Markus Dixon – (redshirt) freshman (6'4, 245); 87 Christian Bentancur – freshman (6'5, 235); Placekickers: 36 Quinn Castner – (redshirt) senior (5'5, 150); 38 Robert Gunn III – (redshirt) sophomore (6'0, 180); 47 Hogan Morton – (redshirt) junior (5'9, 165); 81 Nolan Hauser – freshman (6'1, 180)	Offensive linemen: 50 Collin Sadler – (redshirt) sophomore (6'6, 310); 52 Elyjah Thurmon – freshman (6'4, 290); 53 Ryan Linthicum – C – (redshirt) junior (6'3, 305); 54 Ian Reed – (redshirt) freshman (6'6, 325); 55 Harris Sewell – sophomore (6'4, 315); 56 Watson Young – freshman (6'3, 285); 57 Jackson Hall – (redshirt) sophomore (6'3, 300); 59 Dietrick Pennington – (redshirt) junior (6'5, 340); 62 Bryce Smith – (redshirt) freshman (6'3, 270); 63 Dominic Cardone – (redshirt) sophomore (6'9, 380); 64 Walker Parks – (redshirt) senior (6'5, 310); 65 Chapman Pendergrass – (redshirt) sophomore (6'3, 290); 67 Nathan Brooks – (redshirt) junior (6'4, 300); 68 Will Boggs – (redshirt) senior (6'3, 290); 69 Sam Judy – (redshirt) junior (6'5, 315); 70 Mason Johnstone – (redshirt) sophomore (6'5, 255); 71 Tristan Leigh – (redshirt) junior (6'6, 315); 74 Marcus Tate – senior (6'5, 325); 75 Trent Howard – (redshirt) senior (6'3, 295); 76 Mason Wade – freshman (6'5, 290); 77 Ronan O'Connell – freshman (6'5, 310); 78 Blake Miller – junior (6'6, 310); 79 Jake Norris – (redshirt) freshman (6'1, 290); Defensive ends: 3 T. J. Parker – sophomore (6'3, 255); 15 Jahiem Lawson – (redshirt) sophomore (6'2, 240); 34 Armon Mason – (redshirt) junior (6'2, 240); 42 Hevin Brown-Shuler – freshman (6'5, 290); 44 Cade Denhoff – (redshirt) junior (6'5, 255); 49 Darien Mayo – freshman (6'7, 250); 58 Aidan Hydrick – freshman (6'1, 220); 91 Zaire Patterson – (redshirt) junior (6'5, 260); 92 Levi Matthews – (redshirt) sophomore (6'5, 235); 99 A.J. Hoffler – sophomore (6'4, 250); Defensive tackles: 8 Tré Williams – (redshirt) senior (6'2, 305); 11 Peter Woods – sophomore (6'2, 315); 19 DeMonte Capehart – (redshirt) senior (6'5, 320); 45 Vic Burley – (redshirt) freshman (6'4, 315); 55 Payton Page – senior (6'4, 315); 56 Champ Thompson – freshman (6'3, 280); 90 Stephiylan Green – (redshirt) freshman (6'4, 280); 93 Caden Story – (redshirt) sophomore (6'3, 280); 95 Peyton Pitts – (redshirt) sophomore (6'6, 310); 96 Jaheim Scott – (redshirt) senior (6'1, 330); 97 Patrick Swygert – (redshirt) freshman (6'4, 245); Long snappers: 45 Philip Florenzo – (redshirt) senior (6'2, 240); 58 Holden Caspersen – (redshirt) junior (5'11, 215)	Linebackers: 0 Barrett Carter – senior (6'1, 230); 13 Drew Woodaz – freshman (6'3, 215); 17 Wade Woodaz – junior (6'3, 230); 21 Kobe McCloud – (redshirt) sophomore (5'10, 225); 22 Dee Crayton – (redshirt) freshman (6'2, 225); 26 C.J. Kubah-Taylor – freshman (6'3, 230); 32 Jamal Anderson – sophomore (6'2, 215); 33 Griffin Batt – (redshirt) sophomore (6'0, 225); 40 Reed Morrissey – (redshirt) junior (6'0, 220); 43 Billy Wilkes – freshman (6'2, 205); 47 Sammy Brown – freshman (6'2, 235); 50 Fletcher Cothran – (redshirt) sophomore (6'3, 215); 52 William Bouton – freshman (6'4, 290); 53 Joseph Roberto II – freshman (6'2, 235); 57 Chandler McMaster – (redshirt) sophomore (6'1, 240); Cornerbacks: 1 Branden Strozier (redshirt) freshman (6'1, 180); 2 Shelton Lewis – sophomore (5'11, 185); 6 Tavoy Feagin – freshman (6'0, 175); 10 Jeadyn Lukus – junior (6'2, 200); 12 Corian Gipson – freshman (6'1, 180); 16 Myles Oliver – (redshirt) sophomore (5'11, 180); 20 Avieon Terrell – sophomore (5'11, 180); 23 Ashton Hampton – freshman (6'2, 190); 29 Michael Mankaka – (redshirt) sophomore (6'0, 185); 35 Austin Randall – graduate student (6'1, 190); Safeties: 5 Sherrod Covil Jr. – junior (5'11, 200); 7 Khalil Barnes – sophomore (6'0, 195); 9 R.J. Mickens – graduate student (6'0, 210); 14 Rob Billings – (redshirt) freshman (6'2, 200); 16 Ronan Hanafin – sophomore (6'3, 215); 18 Kylon Griffin – (redshirt) sophomore (5'11, 200); 24 Tyler Venables – (redshirt) senior (5'11, 205); 25 Ricardo Jones – freshman (6'2, 190); 27 Noah Dixon – freshman (6'1, 190); 30 Kylen Webb – (redshirt) freshman (6'0, 195); 31 Joe Wilkinson – freshman (6'1, 180); 36 Boston Miller – (redshirt) sophomore (6'2, 200); 37 Jacob Hendricks – (redshirt) junior (5'7, 180); 38 Peter Nearn – (redshirt) junior (6'2, 205); 39 Bubba McAtee – (redshirt) senior (6'3, 210); 41 Caleb Nix – (redshirt) sophomore (6'0, 200); 48 Walt Smith – (redshirt) sophomore (5'8, 180); Punters: 37 Will McCune – (redshirt) sophomore (6'2, 225); 39 Aidan Swanson – P/K – graduate student (6'3, 170); 40 Brodey Conn – P/S – (redshirt) freshman (6'0, 205); 89 Jack Smith – (redshirt) sophomore (6'5, 235)

== Game summaries ==
=== Vs. No. 1 Georgia (rivalry) ===
No. 14 Clemson Tigers vs. No. 1 Georgia Bulldogs − Game summary

Quarter	1	2	3	4	Total
No. 14 Tigers	0	0	3	0	3
No. 1 Bulldogs	0	6	14	14	34

at Mercedes-Benz Stadium • Atlanta, GA

- Date: August 31, 2024
- Game time: 12:00 p.m.
- Game weather: None (retractable roof closed)
- Game attendance: 78,827
- Referee: Michael Roche
- TV announcers (ABC): Sean McDonough (play-by-play), Greg McElroy (analyst), and Molly McGrath (sideline reporter)

Game information

First quarter

- No scoring plays

Second quarter

- (8:49) Georgia – Peyton Woodring 30 yard field goal (Drive: 12 plays, 68 yards, 6:26; Georgia 3–0)
- (4:16) Georgia – Woodring 55 yard field goal (Drive: 5 plays, 31 yards, 2:05; Georgia 6–0)

Third quarter

- (12:01) Georgia – Colbie Young 7 yard pass from Carson Beck, Woodring Kick (Drive: 6 plays, 75 yards, 2:59; Georgia 13–0)
- (6:34) Clemson – Nolan Hauser 26 yard field goal (Drive: 12 plays, 66 yards, 5:27; Georgia 13–3)
- (3:15) Georgia – Nate Frazier 1 yard rush, Woodring Kick (Drive: 8 plays, 75 yards, 3:19; Georgia 20–3)

Fourth quarter

- (9:57) Georgia – London Humphreys 40 yard pass from Beck, Woodring Kick (Drive: 5 plays, 54 yards, 2:22; Georgia 27–3)
- (6:09) Georgia – Cash Jones 15 yard rush, Woodring Kick (Drive: 5 plays, 78 yards, 3:17; Georgia 34–3)

Statistics	CLEM	UGA
First downs	13	19
Total yards	188	447
Rushing yards	46	169
Passing yards	142	278
Passing: Comp–Att–Int	18–29–1	23–33–0
Time of possession	27:18	32:42

Team	Category	Player	Statistics
Clemson	Passing	Cade Klubnik	18/29, 142 yards, INT
Clemson	Rushing	Phil Mafah	16 rushes, 59 yards
Clemson	Receiving	Antonio Williams	6 receptions, 76 yards
Georgia	Passing	Carson Beck	23/33, 278 yards, 2 TD
Georgia	Rushing	Nate Frazier	11 rushes, 83 yards, TD
Georgia	Receiving	Arian Smith	5 receptions, 56 yards

=== Appalachian State ===
Appalachian State Mountaineers vs. No. 25 Clemson Tigers − Game summary

Quarter	1	2	3	4	Total
Mountaineers	0	13	7	0	20
No. 25 Tigers	35	21	10	0	66

at Memorial Stadium • Clemson, SC

- Date: September 7, 2024
- Game time: 8:00 p.m.
- Game weather: Temperature: 74 °F (23 °C) • Wind: NE 8 mph • Weather: Cloudy
- Game attendance: 81,500
- Referee: Stuart Mullins
- TV announcers (ACCN): Wes Durham (play-by-play), Tom Luginbill (analyst), and Dana Boyle (sideline reporter)

Game information
First quarter
- (13:46) Clemson – Bryant Wesco Jr. 76-yard pass from Cade Klubnik, Nolan Hauser kick (Drive: 3 plays, 75 yards, 1:14; Clemson 7–0)
- (9:40) Clemson – Klubnik 2-yard run, Hauser kick (Drive: 6 plays, 84 yards, 2:16; Clemson 14–0)
- (7:08) Clemson – Phil Mafah 83-yard run, Hauser kick (Drive: 3 plays, 92 yards, 1:10; Clemson 21–0)
- (2:34) Clemson – Jake Briningstool 41-yard pass from Klubnik, Hauser kick (Drive: 5 plays, 69 yards, 1:51; Clemson 28–0)
- (1:11) Clemson – Antonio Williams 29-yard pass from Klubnik, Hauser kick (Drive: 1 play, 44 yards, 0:12; Clemson 35–0)

Second quarter

- (12:58) Clemson – Klubnik 3-yard run, Hauser kick (Drive: 5 plays, 30 yards, 2:02; Clemson 42–0)
- (10:39) App State – Anderson Castle 4-yard run, Michael Hughes kick (Drive: 7 plays, 63 yards, 2:14; Clemson 42–7)
- (6:48) Clemson – T. J. Moore 33-yard pass from Klubnik, Hauser kick (Drive: 9 plays, 71 yards, 3:47; Clemson 49–7)
- (3:28) App State – Hughes 36-yard field goal (Drive: 6 plays, 12 yards, 1:49; Clemson 49–10)
- (0:54) Clemson – Jake Briningstool 17-yard pass from Klubnik, Hauser kick (Drive: 9 plays, 75 yards, 2:34; Clemson 56–10)
- (0:00) App State – Hughes 35-yard field goal (Drive: 7 plays, 58 yards, 0:54; Clemson 56–13)

Third quarter

- (12:31) App State – Makai Jackson 17-yard pass from Joey Aguilar, Hughes kick (Drive: 6 plays, 75 yards, 2:29; Clemson 56–20)
- (3:10) Clemson – Christopher Vizzina 5-yard run, Hauser kick (Drive: 7 plays, 61 yards, 3:15; Clemson 63–20)
- (1:51) Clemson – Hauser 36-yard field goal (Drive: 4 plays, 1 yard, 1:14; Clemson 66–20)

Fourth quarter

- None

Statistics	APP	CLEM
First downs	24	28
Total yards	363	712
Rushing yards	149	252
Passing yards	214	460
Passing: Comp–Att–Int	18–43–2	32–39–0
Time of possession	28:27	31:33

Team	Category	Player	Statistics
Appalachian State	Passing	Joey Aguilar	18/41, 214 yards, TD
Appalachian State	Rushing	Anderson Castle	7 carries, 80 yards, TD
Appalachian State	Receiving	Kaedin Robinson	3 receptions, 58 yards
Clemson	Passing	Cade Klubnik	24/26, 378 yards, 5 TD
Clemson	Rushing	Phil Mafah	10 carries, 118 yards, TD
Clemson	Receiving	Bryant Wesco Jr.	3 receptions, 130 yards, TD

=== North Carolina State (Textile Bowl) ===
NC State Wolfpack vs. No. 21 Clemson Tigers − Game summary

Quarter	1	2	3	4	Total
Wolfpack	0	7	7	21	35
No. 21 Tigers	28	17	14	0	59

at Memorial Stadium • Clemson, SC

- Date: September 21, 2024
- Game time: 12:00 p.m.
- Game weather: Sunny, 84 °F (29 °C)
- Game attendance: 81,500
- Referee: Adam Savoie
- TV announcers (ABC): Sean McDonough (play-by-play), Greg McElroy (analyst), and Molly McGrath (sideline reporter)

Game information
First quarter
- (13:29) Clemson – Cade Klubnik 55-yard run, Nolan Hauser kick (Drive: 4 plays, 75 yards, 1:31; Clemson 7–0)
- (7:56) Clemson – Antonio Williams 31-yard pass from Klubnik, Hauser kick (Drive: 6 plays, 91 yards, 1:34; Clemson 14–0)
- (5:07) Clemson – A. Williams 2-yard pass from Klubnik, Hauser kick (Drive: 5 plays, 18 yards, 2:05; Clemson 21–0)
- (2:08) Clemson – Phil Mafah 38-yard run, Hauser kick (Drive: 1 play, 38 yards, 0:07; Clemson 28–0)

Second quarter

- (7:25) NC State – Jordan Waters 5-yard pass from CJ Bailey, Kanoah Vinesett kick (Drive: 9 plays, 71 yards, 4:37; Clemson 28–7)
- (5:53) Clemson – Cole Turner 18-yard run, Hauser kick (Drive: 5 plays, 75 yards, 1:32; Clemson 35–7)
- (1:15) Clemson – Jay Haynes 19-yard run, Hauser kick (Drive: 9 plays, 89 yards, 3:12; Clemson 42–7)
- (0:00) Clemson – Hauser 20-yard field goal (Drive: 7 plays, 24 yards, 0:47; Clemson 45–7)

Third quarter

- (9:07) Clemson – Adam Randall 4-yard pass from Klubnik, Hauser kick (Drive: 7 plays, 54 yards, 3:05; Clemson 52–7)
- (6:38) NC State – Kendrick Raphael 10-yard run, Vinesett kick (Drive: 4 plays, 75 yards, 2:29; Clemson 52–14)
- (0:32) Clemson – Ashton Hampton 53-yard interception return, Hauser kick (Clemson 59–14)

Fourth quarter

- (12:07) NC State – Hollywood Smothers 2-yard run, Vinesett kick (Drive: 6 plays, 75 yards, 3:25; Clemson 59–21)
- (8:21) NC State – Demarcus Jones II 6-yard run, Vinesett kick (Drive: 4 plays, 52 yards, 1:39; Clemson 59–28)
- (0:05) NC State – Terrell Anderson 40-yard pass from Lex Thomas, Vinesett kick (Drive: 10 plays, 87 yards, 3:42; Clemson 59–35)

Statistics	NCST	CLEM
First downs	25	24
Total yards	440	523
Rushing yards	183	269
Passing yards	257	254
Passing: Comp–Att–Int	20–31–1	21–34–0
Time of possession	33:11	26:49

Team	Category	Player	Statistics
NC State	Passing	CJ Bailey	16/25, 204 yards, TD, INT
NC State	Rushing	Kendrick Raphael	10 carries, 94 yards, TD
NC State	Receiving	Kevin Concepcion	5 receptions, 40 yards
Clemson	Passing	Cade Klubnik	16/24, 209 yards, 3 TD
Clemson	Rushing	Phil Mafah	7 carries, 107 yards, TD
Clemson	Receiving	Adam Randall	5 receptions, 69 yards, TD

=== Stanford ===
Stanford Cardinal vs. No. 17 Clemson Tigers − Game summary

Quarter	1	2	3	4	Total
Cardinal	0	7	0	7	14
No. 17 Tigers	10	7	10	13	40

at Memorial Stadium • Clemson, SC

- Date: September 28, 2024
- Game time: 7:00 p.m.
- Game weather: Temperature: 72 °F (22 °C) • Wind: SW 4 mph • Weather: Sunny
- Game attendance: 80,295
- Referee: Marcus Woods
- TV announcers (ESPN): Mark Jones (play-by-play), Roddy Jones (analyst), and Quint Kessenich (sideline reporter)

Game information
First quarter
- (12:19) Clemson – Cade Klubnik 34-yard run, Nolan Hauser kick (Drive: 3 plays, 34 yards, 0:54; Clemson 7–0)
- (05:49) Clemson – Hauser 20-yard field goal (Drive: 5 plays, 77 yards, 2:09; Clemson 10–0)

Second quarter

- (01:49) Clemson – Jake Briningstool 3-yard pass from Klubnik, Hauser kick (Drive: 8 plays, 54 yards, 2:31; Clemson 17–0)
- (00:39) Stanford – Elic Ayomanor 19 yard pass from Ashton Daniels, Emmet Kenney kick (Drive: 7 plays, 75 yards, 1:10' Clemson 17–7)

Third quarter

- (10:06) Clemson – Hauser 33-yard field goal (Drive: 12 plays, 58 yards, 4:48; Clemson 20–7)
- (01:09) Clemson – Cole Turner 43 yard pass from Klubnik, Hauser kick (Drive: 2 plays, 43 yards, 0:47; Clemson 27–7)

Fourth quarter

- (14:10) Clemson – Bryant Wesco 34 yard pass from Klubnik, Hauser kick blocked (Drive: 1 play, 34 yards, 0:07; Clemson 33–7)
- (10:36) Clemson – Olsen Patt-Henry 2 yard pass from Klubnik, Hauser kick (Drive: 4 plays, 35 yards, 01:15; Clemson 40–7)
- (02:31) Stanford – Emmett Mosley V 22 yard pass from Justin Lamson, Kenney kick (Drive: 8 plays, 66 yards, 03:52; Clemson 40–14)

Statistics	STAN	CLEM
First downs	20	18
Total yards	361	405
Rushing yards	236	150
Passing yards	125	255
Passing: Comp–Att–Int	13–27–3	15–31–1
Time of possession	33:47	26:13

Team	Category	Player	Statistics
Stanford	Passing	Ashton Daniels	9/19, 71 yards, 1 TD, 3 INTs
Stanford	Rushing	Micah Ford	15 carries, 122 yards
Stanford	Receiving	Elic Ayomanor	4 receptions, 50 yards, 1 TD
Clemson	Passing	Cade Klubnik	15/31, 255 yards, 4 TDs, 1 INT
Clemson	Rushing	Phil Mafah	10 carries, 58 yards
Clemson	Receiving	Bryant Wesco	2 receptions, 104 yards, 1 TD

=== at Florida State (rivalry) ===
No. 15 Clemson Tigers vs Florida State Seminoles – Game summary

Quarter	1	2	3	4	Total
No. 15 Tigers	17	6	0	6	29
Seminoles	0	7	0	6	13

at Doak Campbell Stadium • Tallahassee, FL

- Date: Saturday October 5, 2024
- Game time: 7:00 p.m.
- Game weather: Temperature: 82 °F (28 °C) • Wind: SW 7 mph • Weather: Cloudy
- Game attendance: 55,107
- Referee: Mick Roche
- TV announcers (ESPN): Mark Jones (play-by-play), Roddy Jones (analyst), and Quint Kessenich (sideline reporter)

Game information
First quarter
- (06:33) Clemson – Nolan Hauser 26-yard field goal (Drive: 12 plays, 66 yards, 5:32; Clemson 3–0)
- (03:20) Clemson – Antonio Williams 57-yard pass from Cade Klubnik, Hauser kick (Drive: 2 plays, 58 yards, 0:44; Clemson 10–0)
- (00:02) Clemson – T. J. Moore 23-yard pass from Klubnik, Hauser kick (Drive: 4 plays, 50 yards, 1:06; Clemson 17–0)

Second quarter

- (09:36) Florida State – Amaree Williams 13 yard pass from Brock Glenn, Ryan Fitzgerald kick (Drive: 8 plays, 75 yards, 3:51; Clemson 17–7)
- (01:51) Clemson – Hauser 38-yard field goal (Drive: 9 plays, 51 yards, 3:07; Clemson 20–7)
- (00:00) Clemson – Hauser 25-yard field goal (Drive: 12 plays, 77 yards, 1:12; Clemson 23–7)

Third quarter

- None

Fourth quarter

- (11:11) Florida State – Ja'Khi Douglas 12 yard pass from Glenn, 2 point conversion failed (Drive: 15 plays, 74 yards, 5:48; Clemson 23–13)
- (06:38) Clemson – Hauser 31-yard field goal (Drive: 5 plays, 61 yards, 3:58; Clemson 26–13)
- (01:54) Clemson – Hauser 24-yard field goal (Drive: 8 plays, 48 yards, 3:45; Clemson 29–13)

Statistics	CLEM	FSU
First downs	28	14
Total yards	500	250
Rushing yards	265	22
Passing yards	235	228
Passing: Comp–Att–Int	19–34–0	23–41–1
Time of possession	31:13	28:47

Team	Category	Player	Statistics
Clemson	Passing	Cade Klubnik	19/33, 235 yards, 2 TDs
Clemson	Rushing	Phil Mafah	25 carries, 154 yards
Clemson	Receiving	Antonio Williams	3 receptions, 84 yards
Florida State	Passing	Brock Glenn	23/41, 228 yards, 2 TDs, 1 INT
Florida State	Rushing	Lawrance Toafili	10 carries, 16 yards
Florida State	Receiving	Landen Thomas	7 receptions, 80 yards

=== at Wake Forest ===
No. 10 Clemson Tigers vs. Wake Forest Demon Deacons − Game summary

Quarter	1	2	3	4	Total
No. 10 Tigers	0	28	14	7	49
Demon Deacons	7	7	0	0	14

at Allegacy Federal Credit Union Stadium • Winston-Salem, NC

- Date: October 12, 2024
- Game time: 12:00 p.m.
- Game weather: Temperature: 65 °F (18 °C) • Wind: W 5 mph • Weather: Sunny
- Game attendance: 31,553
- Referee: Jerry Magallanes
- TV announcers (ESPN): Dave Pasch (play-by-play), Dusty Dvoracek (analyst), and Taylor McGregor (sideline)

Game information
First quarter
- (01:32) Wake Forest – Horatio Fields 31-yard pass from Hank Bachmeier, Matthew Dennis kick (Drive: 8 plays, 73 yards, 2:09; Wake 7–0)

Second quarter

- (13:39) Clemson – Antonio Williams 22-yard pass from Cade Klubnik, Nolan Hauser kick (Drive: 8 plays, 75 yards, 2:53; Tied 7–7)
- (12:34) Clemson – Phil Mafah 1-yard run, Hauser kick (Drive: 2 plays, 23 yards, 0:27; Clemson 14–7)
- (06:46) Clemson – Mafah 2-yard run, Hauser kick (Drive: 9 plays, 57 yards, 3:27; Clemson 21–7)
- (03:18) Wake Forest – Michael Frogge 6-yard pass from Bachmeier, Dennis kick (Drive: 8 plays, 75 yards, 3:28; Clemson 21–14)
- (01:31) Clemson – Troy Stellato 8-yard pass from Klubnik, Hauser kick (Drive: 6 plays, 75 yards, 1:47; Clemson 28–14)

Third quarter

- (09:52) Clemson – Adam Randall 9-yard pass from Klubnik, Hauser kick (Drive: 10 plays, 75 yards, 5:08; Clemson 35–14)
- (07:03) Clemson – Jake Briningstool 22-yard pass from Williams, Hauser kick (Drive: 3 plays, 53 yards, 1:23; Clemson 42–14)

Fourth quarter

- (08:55) Clemson – Keith Adams Jr. 4-yard run, Hauser kick (Drive: 17 plays, 87 yards, 8:24; Clemson 49–7)

Statistics	CLEM	WAKE
First downs	37	16
Total yards	566	233
Rushing yards	223	87
Passing yards	343	146
Passing: Comp–Att–Int	33–44–0	14–29–2
Time of possession	36:29	22:31

Team	Category	Player	Statistics
Clemson	Passing	Cade Klubnik	31/41, 309 yards, 3 TDs
Clemson	Rushing	Phil Mafah	20 carries, 118 yards, 2 TDs
Clemson	Receiving	Jake Briningstool	7 receptions, 104 yards, 1 TD
Wake Forest	Passing	Hank Bachmeier	12/21, 126 yards, 2 TDs, 2 INTs
Wake Forest	Rushing	Demond Claiborne	18 carries, 53 yards
Wake Forest	Receiving	Deuce Alexander	3 receptions, 32 yards

=== Virginia ===
Virginia Cavaliers vs. No. 10 Clemson Tigers − Game summary

Quarter	1	2	3	4	Total
Cavaliers	3	7	0	21	31
No. 10 Tigers	3	14	21	10	48

at Memorial Stadium • Clemson, SC

- Date: October 19, 2024
- Game time: 12:00 p.m.
- Game weather: Temperature: 64 °F (18 °C) • Wind: NE 6 mph • Weather: Sunny
- Game attendance: 80,100
- Referee: Nate Black
- TV announcers (ACCN): Chris Cotter (play-by-play), Mark Herzlich (analyst), and Coley Harvey (sideline)

Game information
First quarter
- (07:56) Clemson – Nolan Hauser 29-yard field goal (Drive: 11 plays, 74 yards, 5:24; Clemson 3–0)
- (00:53) Virginia – Will Bettridge 20-yard field goal (Drive: 14 plays, 80 yards, 6:58; Tied 3–3)

Second quarter

- (12:26) Virginia – Dakota Twitty 8-yard pass from Anthony Colandrea, Bettridge kick (Drive: 6 plays, 34 yards, 2:34; Virginia 10–3)
- (07:38) Clemson – Phil Mafah 1-yard run, Hauser kick (Drive: 11 plays, 80 yards, 4:42; Tied 10–10)
- (03:42) Clemson – Mafah 3-yard run, Hauser kick (Drive: 3 plays, 61 yards, 1:19; Clemson 17–10)

Third quarter

- (09:23) Clemson – Olsen Patt-Henry 11-yard pass from Cade Klubnik, Hauser kick (Drive: 11 plays, 90 yards, 5:31; Clemson 24–10)
- (04:31) Clemson – Antonio Williams 36-yard run, Hauser kick (Drive: 8 plays, 68 yards, 2:57; Clemson 31–10)
- (01:30) Clemson – Patt-Henry 40-yard pass from Klubnik, Hauser kick (Drive: 4 plays, 49 yards, 1:22; Clemson 38–10)

Fourth quarter

- (14:53) Virginia – Malachi Fields 44-yard pass from Colandrea, Bettridge kick (Drive: 5 plays, 75 yards, 1:37; Clemson 38–17)
- (08:22) Clemson – Hauser 22-yard field goal (Drive: 14 plays, 70 yards, 6:31; Clemson 41–17)
- (02:11) Virginia – Sackett Wood Jr. 8-yard pass from Tony Muskett, Kobe Pace pass from Muskett (Drive: 9 plays, 65 yards, 2:36; Clemson 41–25)
- (01:54) Clemson – T. J. Moore 34-yard pass from Klubnik, Hauser kick (Drive: 2 plays, 39 yards, 0:14; Clemson 48–25)
- (01:39) Virginia – Ethan Davies 65-yard pass from Muskett, 2 point conversion failed (Drive: 1 plays, 75 yards, 0:15; Clemson 48–31)

Statistics	UVA	CLEM
First downs	20	28
Total yards	346	539
Rushing yards	69	194
Passing yards	278	345
Passing: Comp–Att–Int	21–33–0	25–37–1
Time of possession	26:04	34:03

Team	Category	Player	Statistics
Virginia	Passing	Anthony Colandrea	15/26, 159 yards, 2 TDs
Virginia	Rushing	Kobe Pace	10 carries, 35 yards
Virginia	Receiving	Malachi Fields; Ethan Davies	3 receptions, 65 yards, 1 TD; 1 reception, 65 yards, 1 TD
Clemson	Passing	Cade Klubnik	23/35, 308 yards, 3 TDs, 1 INT
Clemson	Rushing	Phil Mafah	18 carries, 78 yards, 2 TDs
Clemson	Receiving	T. J. Moore	4 receptions, 78 yards, 1 TD

=== Louisville ===
Louisville Cardinals vs. No. 11т Clemson Tigers − Game summary

Quarter	1	2	3	4	Total
Cardinals	3	14	9	7	33
No. 11т Tigers	7	0	0	14	21

at Memorial Stadium • Clemson, SC

- Date: November 2, 2024
- Game time: 7:30 p.m.
- Game weather: Temperature: 68 °F (20 °C) • Wind: NE 5 mph • Weather: Sunny
- Game attendance: 80,446
- Referee: Adam Savoie
- TV announcers (ESPN): Bob Wischusen (play-by-play), Louis Riddick (analyst), and Kris Budden (sideline reporter)

Game information
First quarter
- (04:39) Louisville – Brock Travelstead 21-yard field goal (Drive: 7 plays, 60 yards, 1:51; Louisville 3–0)
- (00:16) Clemson – Antonio Williams 12-yard pass from Cade Klubnik, Nolan Hauser kick (Drive: 11 plays, 75 yards, 4:23; Clemson 7–3)

Second quarter

- (05:42) Louisville – Tyler Shough 4 yard rush, Travelstead kick (Drive: 7 plays, 92 yards, 2:53; Louisville 10–7)
- (00:43) Louisville – Keyjuan Brown 1 yard rush, Travelstead kick (Drive: 6 plays, 47 yards, 1:00; Louisville 17–7)

Third quarter

- (11:45) Louisville – Travelstead 42-yard field goal (Drive: 10 plays, 50 yards, 3:15; Louisville 20–7)
- (06:47) Louisville – Travelstead 40-yard field goal (Drive: 8 plays, 37 yards, 3:25; Louisville 23–7)
- (03:53) Louisville – Travelstead 49-yard field goal (Drive: 4 plays, 1 yard, 1:00; Louisville 26–7)

Fourth quarter

- (06:00) Clemson – Phil Mafah 3 yard rush, Hauser kick (Drive: 16 plays, 61 yards, 5:01; Louisville 26–14)
- (05:50) Louisville – Isaac Brown 45 yard rush, Travelstead kick (Drive: 1 plays, 45 yards, 0:09; Louisville 33–14)
- (02:07) Clemson – Mafah 1 yard rush, Hauser kick (Drive: 12 plays, 75 yards, 3:43; Louisville 33–21)

Statistics	LOU	CLEM
First downs	19	31
Total yards	366	450
Rushing yards	210	222
Passing yards	156	228
Passing: Comp–Att–Int	17–32–0	33–56–0
Time of possession	22:08	37:52

Team	Category	Player	Statistics
Louisville	Passing	Tyler Shough	17–32, 156 yards
Louisville	Rushing	Isaac Brown	20 carries, 151 yards, TD
Louisville	Receiving	Ja'Corey Brooks	4 receptions, 42 yards
Clemson	Passing	Cade Klubnik	33–56, 228 yards, TD
Clemson	Rushing	Phil Mafah	30 carries, 171 yards, 2 TDs
Clemson	Receiving	T. J. Moore	5 receptions, 63 yards

=== at Virginia Tech ===
No. 23 Clemson Tigers vs. Virginia Tech Hokies − Game summary

Quarter	1	2	3	4	Total
No. 23 Tigers	0	0	14	10	24
Hokies	0	7	0	7	14

at Lane Stadium • Blacksburg, VA

- Date: November 9, 2024
- Game time: 3:30 p.m.
- Game weather: Temperature: 62 °F (17 °C) • Wind: E 7 mph • Weather: Sunny
- Game attendance: 65,632
- Referee: Jerry Magallanes
- TV announcers (ESPN): Mark Jones (play-by-play), Roddy Jones (analyst), and Quint Kessenich (sideline reporter)

Game information
First quarter
- No scoring plays

Second quarter

- (12:46) Virginia Tech – Quentin Reddish 77-yard blocked field goal return, John Love kick (Drive: 1 plays, 77 yards, 0:00; Virginia Tech 7–0)

Third quarter

- (11:25) Clemson – Cole Turner 29-yard pass from Cade Klubnik, Nolan Hauser kick (Drive: 8 plays, 75 yards, 3:35; Tied 7–7)
- (07:34) Clemson – T. J. Moore 41-yard pass from Klubnik, Hauser kick (Drive: 3 plays, 44 yards, 1:32; Clemson 14–7)

Fourth quarter

- (13:08) Clemson – Jake Briningstool 12-yard pass from Klubnik, Hauser kick (Drive: 10 plays, 93 yards, 5:45; Clemson 21–7)
- (05:10) Clemson – Hauser 34-yard field goal (Drive: 4 plays, 4 yards, 0:55; Clemson 24–7)
- (01:43) Virginia Tech – Ayden Green 14-yard pass from Kyron Drones, Love kick (Drive: 13 plays, 75 yards, 3:27; Clemson 24–14)

Statistics	CLEM	VT
First downs	20	15
Total yards	378	228
Rushing yards	167	40
Passing yards	211	188
Passing: Comp–Att–Int	16–34–1	16–37–2
Time of possession	36:49	23:11

Team	Category	Player	Statistics
Clemson	Passing	Cade Klubnik	16–34, 211 yards, 3 TDs, 1 INT
Clemson	Rushing	Phil Mafah	26 carries, 133 yards
Clemson	Receiving	T. J. Moore	2 receptions, 58 yards, 1 TD
Virginia Tech	Passing	Kyron Drones	9–20, 115 yards, 1 INT
Virginia Tech	Rushing	Collin Schlee	5 carries, 28 yards
Virginia Tech	Receiving	Da'Quan Felton	6 receptions, 68 yards

=== at Pittsburgh ===
No. 20 Clemson Tigers vs. Pittsburgh Panthers − Game summary

Quarter	1	2	3	4	Total
No. 20 Tigers	7	10	0	7	24
Panthers	7	0	0	13	20

at Acrisure Stadium • Pittsburgh, PA

- Date: November 16, 2024
- Game time: 12:00 p.m.
- Game weather: Temperature: 49 °F (9 °C) • Wind: NW 9 mph • Weather: Cloudy
- Game attendance: 58,667
- Referee: Stuart Mullins
- TV announcers (ESPN): Sean McDonough (play-by-play), Greg McElroy (analyst), and Molly McGrath (sideline reporter)

Game information
First quarter
- (07:20) Clemson – Antonio Williams 14-yard pass from Cade Klubnik, Nolan Hauser kick (Drive: 8 plays, 93 yards, 3:39; Clemson 7–0)
- (05:22) Pittsburgh – Daniel Carter 2 yard rush, Ben Sauls kick (Drive: 5 plays, 75 yards, 1:58; Tied 7–7)

Second quarter

- (11:18) Clemson – Williams 28-yard pass from Klubnik, Hauser kick (Drive: 3 plays, 75 yards, 1:07; Clemson 14–7)
- (00:03) Clemson – Hauser 51 yard field goal (Drive: 9 plays, 39 yards, 0:45; Clemson 17–7)

Third quarter

- No scoring plays

Fourth quarter

- (10:55) Pittsburgh – Sauls 35 yard field goal (Drive: 17 plays, 68 yards, 8:32; Clemson 17–10)
- (07:05) Pittsburgh – Gavin Bartholomew 8-yard pass from Nate Yarnell, Sauls kick (Drive: 7 plays, 58 yards, 3:22; Tied 17–17)
- (01:36) Pittsburgh – Sauls 47 yard field goal (Drive: 8 plays, 26 yards, 2:41; Pittsburgh 20–17)
- (01:16) Clemson – Klubnik 50 yard rush, Hauser kick (Drive: 3 plays, 75 yards, 0:20; Clemson 24–20)

Statistics	CLEM	PITT
First downs	21	27
Total yards	346	438
Rushing yards	58	88
Passing yards	288	350
Passing: Comp–Att–Int	27–43–0	34–54–1
Time of possession	25:54	34:06

Team	Category	Player	Statistics
Clemson	Passing	Cade Klubnik	27/41, 288 yards, 2 TDs
Clemson	Rushing	Cade Klubnik	10 carries, 41 yards, 1 TD
Clemson	Receiving	Antonio Williams	13 receptions, 149 yards, 2 TDs
Pittsburgh	Passing	Nate Yarnell	34/54, 350 yards, 1 TD, 1 INT
Pittsburgh	Rushing	Desmond Reid	14 carries, 68 yards
Pittsburgh	Receiving	Desmond Reid	10 receptions, 108 yards

=== The Citadel (FCS) ===
Citadel Bulldogs (FCS) vs. No. 17 Clemson Tigers − Game summary

Quarter	1	2	3	4	Total
Bulldogs (FCS)	0	0	7	7	14
No. 17 Tigers	14	21	10	6	51

at Memorial Stadium • Clemson, SC

- Date: November 23, 2024
- Game time: 3:30 p.m.
- Game weather: Temperature: 60 °F (16 °C) • Wind: NE 2 mph • Weather: Sunny
- Game attendance: 80,300
- Referee: Tim Hedgepeth
- TV announcers (The CW): Thom Brennaman (play-by-play), Max Browne (analyst) and Treavor Scales (sideline reporter)

Game information
First quarter
- (08:10) Clemson – Antonio Williams 30-yard pass from Cade Klubnik, Nolan Hauser kick (Drive: 5 plays, 78 yards, 1:47; Clemson 7–0)
- (03:17) Clemson – Payton Page 57 yard interception return, Hauser kick (Drive: N/A, Clemson 14–0)

Second quarter

- (10:49) Clemson – Bryant Wesco Jr. 55-yard pass from Klubnik, Hauser kick (Drive: 7 plays, 80 yards, 2:33; Clemson 21–0)
- (06:07) Clemson – Jay Haynes 70-yard rush, Hauser kick (Drive: 4 plays, 90 yards, 1:50; Clemson 28–0)
- (01:02) Clemson – Haynes 9-yard rush, Hauser kick (Drive: 9 plays, 80 yards, 3:33; Clemson 35–0)

Third quarter

- (13:13) Clemson – Williams 9-yard pass from Klubnik, Hogan Morton kick (Drive: 4 plays, 49 yards, 1:45; Clemson 42–0)
- (05:06) The Citadel – Garrison Johnson 9-yard rush, Ben Barnes kick (Drive: 14 plays, 75 yards, 8:07; Clemson 42–7)
- (00:57) Clemson – Hauser 32-yard field goal (Drive: 9 plays, 50 yards, 4:03; Clemson 45–7)

Fourth quarter

- (10:31) The Citadel – Javonte Graves-Billips 66-yard pass from Johnathan Bennett, Barnes kick (Drive: 2 plays, 72 yards, 0:48; Clemson 45–14)
- (06:25) Clemson – Barrett Carter 4-yard rush, Morton kick blocked (Drive: 9 plays, 70 yards, 4:00; Clemson 51–14)

Statistics	CIT	CLEM
First downs	15	27
Total yards	387	562
Rushing yards	288	302
Passing yards	99	260
Passing: Comp–Att–Int	3–11–1	18–31–1
Time of possession	35:42	24:18

Team	Category	Player	Statistics
The Citadel	Passing	Johnathan Bennett	2–10, 90 yards, 1 TD, 1 INT
The Citadel	Rushing	Johnny Crawford III	7 carries, 70 yards
The Citadel	Receiving	Javonte Graves-Billips	2 receptions, 90 yards, 1 TD
Clemson	Passing	Cade Klubnik	12–16, 198 yards, 3 TDs
Clemson	Rushing	Jay Haynes	5 carries, 118 yards, 2 TDs
Clemson	Receiving	Bryant Wesco Jr.	3 receptions, 75 yards, 1 TD

=== No. 15 South Carolina (rivalry) ===
No. 15 South Carolina Gamecocks vs. No. 12 Clemson Tigers − Game summary

Quarter	1	2	3	4	Total
No. 15 Gamecocks	0	7	0	10	17
No. 12 Tigers	0	7	7	0	14

at Memorial Stadium • Clemson, SC

- Date: November 30, 2024
- Game time: 12:00 p.m.
- Game weather: Temperature: 46 °F (8 °C) • Wind: W 4 mph • Weather: Sunny
- Game attendance: 81,500
- Referee: Kyle Olson
- TV announcers (ESPN): Roy Philpott (play-by-play), Sam Acho (analyst), and Taylor Davis (sideline reporter)

Game information
First quarter
- No scoring plays

Second quarter

- (12:07) Clemson – Cade Klubnik 13-yard rush, Nolan Hauser kick (Drive: 3 plays, 57 yards, 1:25; Clemson 7–0)
- (09:20) South Carolina – LaNorris Sellers 25-yard rush, Alex Herrera kick (Drive: 6 plays, 75 yards, 2:47; Tied 7–7)

Third quarter

- (09:57) Clemson – Klubnik 18-yard rush, Hauser kick (Drive: 11 plays, 75 yards, 5:03; Clemson 14–7)

Fourth quarter

- (06:48) South Carolina – Herrera 42-yard field goal (Drive: 6 plays, 32 yards, 2:30; Clemson 14–10)
- (01:08) South Carolina – Sellers 20-yard rush, Herrera kick (Drive: 9 plays, 75 yards, 4:01; South Carolina 17–14)

Statistics	SCAR	CLEM
First downs	20	22
Total yards	431	419
Rushing yards	139	267
Passing yards	164	280
Passing: Comp–Att–Int	13–21–1	24–37–1
Time of possession	30:37	29:23

Team	Category	Player	Statistics
South Carolina	Passing	LaNorris Sellers	13–21, 164 yards, 1 INT
South Carolina	Rushing	LaNorris Sellers	16 carries, 166 yards, 2 TDs
South Carolina	Receiving	Nyck Harbor	3 receptions, 51 yards
Clemson	Passing	Cade Klubnik	24–36, 280 yards, 1 INT
Clemson	Rushing	Phil Mafah	20 carries, 66 yards
Clemson	Receiving	Antonio Williams	8 receptions, 99 yards

=== Vs. No. 8 SMU (ACC Championship Game) ===
2024 ACC Championship Game
No. 8 SMU Mustangs vs. No. 17 Clemson Tigers – Game summary

Quarter	1	2	3	4	Total
No. 17 Tigers	21	3	7	3	34
No. 8 Mustangs	7	0	7	17	31

at Bank of America Stadium, Charlotte, North Carolina

- Date: December 7, 2024
- Game time: 8:00 p.m.
- Game weather: Temperature: 44 °F (7 °C) • Wind: SE 10 mph • Weather: Clear
- Game attendance: 53,808
- Referee: Adam Savoie
- TV announcers (ABC): ABC: Sean McDonough (play-by-play), Greg McElroy (analyst), and Molly McGrath (sideline reporter)/ESPN Radio: Marc Kestecher (play-by-play), Kelly Stouffer (analyst), and Ian Fitzsimmons (sideline reporter)

Game information
First quarter
- (13:35) Clemson – Bryant Wesco 35-yard pass from Cade Klubnik, Nolan Hauser kick (Drive: 2 plays, 33 yards, 0:39; Clemson 7–0)
- (10:47) Clemson – Jake Briningstool 5-yard pass from Klubnik, Hauser kick (Drive: 4 plays, 28 yards, 1:54; Clemson 14–0)
- (12:07) SMU – Kevin Jennings 24-yard rush, Collin Rogers kick (Drive: 10 plays, 75 yards, 3:42; Clemson 14–7)
- (03:28) Clemson – Wesco 43-yard pass from Klubnik, Hauser kick (Drive: 8 plays, 75 yards, 3:37; Clemson 21–7)

Second quarter

- (05:22) Clemson – Hauser 44-yard field goal (Drive: 7 plays, 19 yards, 2:15; Clemson 24–7)

Third quarter

- (11:04) SMU – Jamarion Carroll 43-yard pass from Jennings, Rogers kick (Drive: 7 plays, 74 yards, 2:30; Clemson 24–14)
- (00:23) Clemson – Briningstool 5-yard pass from Klubnik, Hauser kick (Drive: 10 plays, 58 yards, 4:55; Clemson 31–14)

Fourth quarter

- (13:22) SMU – Matthew Hibner 20-yard pass from Jennings, Rogers kick (Drive: 7 plays, 75 yards, 2:01; Clemson 31–21)
- (11:04) SMU – Rogers 46-yard field goal (Drive: 8 plays, 21 yards, 3:17; Clemson 31–24)
- (00:16) SMU – Roderick Daniels Jr. 4-yard pass from Jennings, Rogers kick (Drive: 16 plays, 79 yards, 3:49; Clemson 31–31)
- (00:00) Clemson – Hauser 56-yard field goal (Drive: 2 plays, 17 yards, 0:09; Clemson 34–31)

Statistics	CLEM	SMU
First downs	20	28
Total yards	326	458
Rushing yards	64	154
Passing yards	262	304
Passing: Comp–Att–Int	24–41–0	31–51–1
Time of possession	32:09	27:51

Team	Category	Player	Statistics
Clemson	Passing	Cade Klubnik	21–41, 262 yards, 4 TDs
Clemson	Rushing	Phil Mafah	13 rushes, 28 yards
Clemson	Receiving	Bryant Wesco	8 receptions, 143 yards. 2 TDs
SMU	Passing	Kevin Jennings	31–50, 304 yards, 3 TDs, 1 INT
SMU	Rushing	Brashard Smith	24 rushes, 113 yards
SMU	Receiving	Roderick Daniels Jr.	8 receptions, 97 yards, 1 TD

=== at No. 3 Texas (CFP First Round) ===
CFP First Round
No. 3 Texas Longhorns vs. No. 16 Clemson Tigers – Game summary

Quarter	1	2	3	4	Total
No. 16 Tigers	7	3	7	7	24
No. 3 Longhorns	7	21	3	7	38

at Darrell K Royal–Texas Memorial Stadium, Austin, Texas

- Date: December 21, 2024
- Game time: 4:00 p.m.
- Game weather: Temperature: 60 °F (16 °C) • Wind: East • Weather: Sunny
- Game attendance: 101,150
- Referee: Ron Snodgrass
- TV announcers (TNT): Dave Pasch (play-by-play), Dusty Dvoracek (analyst), Taylor McGregor, and Laura Rutledge (sideline)

Game information
First quarter
- (08:14) Clemson – Antonio Williams 22-yard pass from Cade Klubnik, Nolan Hauser kick (Drive: 12 plays, 75 yards, 6:46; Clemson 7–0)
- (2:04) Texas – Quintrevion Wisner 3-yard rush, Bert Auburn kick (Drive: 12 plays, 75 yards, 6:10; Tied 7–7)

Second quarter

- (12:49) Texas – Jaydon Blue 38-yard rush, Auburn kick (Drive: 5 plays, 65 yards, 2:04; Texas 14–7)
- (07:26) Texas – Wisner 16-yard rush, Auburn kick (Drive: 6 plays, 82 yards, 2:57; Texas 21–7)
- (01:33) Clemson – Hauser 32-yard field goal (Drive: 7 plays, 40 yards, 1:07; Texas 21–10)
- (00:28) Texas – Gunnar Helm 19-yard pass from Quinn Ewers, Auburn kick (Drive: 7 plays, 65 yards, 1:05; Texas 28–10)

Third quarter

- (08:10) Texas – Auburn 22-yard field goal (Drive: 14 plays, 71 yards, 6:50; Texas 31–10)
- (3:29) Clemson – Jarvis Green 25-yard pass from Klubnik, Hauser kick (Drive: 4 plays, 55 yards, 1:05; Texas 31–17)

Fourth quarter

- (11:43) Clemson – T. J. Moore 7-yard pass from Klubnik, Hauser kick (Drive: 10 plays, 64 yards, 4:12; Texas 31–24)
- (10:48) Texas – Blue 77-yard rush, Auburn kick (Drive: 2 plays, 83 yards, 0:51; Texas 38–24)

Statistics	CLEM	TEX
First downs	26	20
Total yards	412	494
Rushing yards	76	292
Passing yards	336	202
Passing: Comp–Att–Int	26–43–1	17–24–1
Time of possession	27:03	32:57

Team	Category	Player	Statistics
Clemson	Passing	Cade Klubnik	26–43, 336 yards, 3 TDs, 1 INT
Clemson	Rushing	Adam Randall	4 carries, 44 yards
Clemson	Receiving	T. J. Moore	9 receptions, 116 yards, 1 TD
Texas	Passing	Quinn Ewers	17–24, 202 yards, 1 TD, 1 INT
Texas	Rushing	Jaydon Blue	14 carries, 146 yards, 2 TDs
Texas	Receiving	Gunnar Helm	6 receptions, 77 yards, 1 TD

== Awards and honors ==
Individual Awards
Player	Position	Award	Ref.
Sammy Brown	LB	ACC Defensive Rookie of the Year	

All-ACC
Player	Position	Team
Barrett Carter	LB	First-Team
Blake Miller	OT	First-Team
Antonio Williams	WR	First-Team
T. J. Parker	DE	Second Team
Markus Tate	OG	Second Team
Avieon Terrell	CB	Second Team
Jake Briningstool	TE	Third Team
Phil Mafah	RB	Third Team
Walker Parks	OG	Third Team
Payton Page	DT	Third Team
Khalil Barnes	S	Honorable Mention
DeMonte Capehart	DT	Honorable Mention
Cade Klubnik	QB	Honorable Mention
Tristan Leigh	OT	Honorable Mention
Ryan Linthicum	C	Honorable Mention
R.J. Mickens	S	Honorable Mention
Antonio Williams	AP	Honorable Mention
Wade Woodaz	LB	Honorable Mention
Peter Woods	DT	Honorable Mention

== Rankings ==
Ranking movements Legend: ██ Increase in ranking ██ Decrease in ranking т = Tied with team above or below
	Week																
Poll	Pre	1	2	3	4	5	6	7	8	9	10	11	12	13	14	15	Final
AP	14	25	22	21	17	15	10	10	9	11т	19	17	17	12	18	13	14
Coaches	14	22	20	19	15	14	11	9	9	8	17	16	16	12	17	13	11т
CFP	Not released										23	20	17	12	17	16	Not released
