= ACC Championship Game =

Annual American football game

- Sport: College football
- Conference: Atlantic Coast Conference
- Current stadium: Bank of America Stadium
- Current location: Charlotte, North Carolina
- Played: 2005–2026
- Last contest: 2025
- Current champion: Duke Blue Devils
- Most championships: Clemson (9)
- TV partner: ABC/ESPN
- Official website: TheACC.com Football

Sponsors
- Dr Pepper (2005–2018); Subway (2021–2022)

Host stadiums
- EverBank Field (2005–2007); Raymond James Stadium (2008–2009); Bank of America Stadium (2010–2015, 2017–2026); Camping World Stadium (2016)

Host locations
- Jacksonville, Florida (2005–2007); Tampa, Florida (2008–2009); Charlotte, North Carolina (2010–2015, 2017–2026); Orlando, Florida (2016)

The ACC Championship Game is an annual American college football game held in early December by the Atlantic Coast Conference (ACC) each year to determine its football champion. From its inception in 2005 to 2019, and from 2021 to 2022, the game pit the champion of the Coastal Division against the champion of the Atlantic Division in a game that followed the conclusion of the regular season. Starting with the 2023 season, the ACC eliminated the divisions, and the top two teams with the best conference record meet in the championship game in Charlotte, North Carolina. Duke is the current conference champion after defeating Virginia in the 2025 championship game.

The Atlantic Division was represented by either Clemson or Florida State in twelve of fifteen years through 2019, including eleven straight from 2009 to 2019, and five straight by Clemson from 2015 to 2019. The Coastal Division was represented by either Georgia Tech or Virginia Tech for the first eight games from 2005 to 2012, but from 2013 to 2019 all seven Coastal teams each represented the division after Virginia won in 2019. North Carolina State, Syracuse, California and Stanford have yet to make an appearance. Clemson in 2018 became the first team to win four consecutive ACC Championship Games, on the heels of FSU winning three straight. The Tigers then extended the record to five straight titles in 2019 and six straight in 2020. Their streak ended in 2021 when the Pittsburgh Panthers won the game, beating Wake Forest.

When there were ACC football divisions, Atlantic Division winners went on to win the ACC Championship Game for nine consecutive years from 2011 to 2019, and were 11–5 in the game overall. The Coastal teams won four consecutive years from 2007 to 2010, but did not win again until 2021. There are no football divisions from the 2023 season onwards, the game instead pitting the two ACC teams with the highest conference winning percentage against each other. For the 2020 season, Notre Dame joined the ACC for conference play in football due to the COVID-19 pandemic and played in the first ever division-less format for the game.

The ACC Championship Game is held at Bank of America Stadium in Charlotte, North Carolina each year, after being held in Florida (Jacksonville and Tampa) for its first five years. It was to remain a permanent fixture in Charlotte through at least 2030, but was cut to last until 2026 after the College Football Playoff's expansion to 24 teams the following year forced it to be discontinued after that point.

== History ==
Before the 2004 college football season, the Atlantic Coast Conference determined its champion via round-robin play during the course of the regular season and there was no conference championship game. In 2004, the Atlantic Coast conference added two teams—Virginia Tech and Miami—expanding the league to 11 teams. At the time, college football teams were limited by the NCAA to 11 regular-season games, three or four of which typically featured teams outside the home team's conference. Following the 2004 season, the league added a 12th team—Boston College—and became eligible to hold a championship game at the conclusion of the 2005 season.

The conference was divided into two divisions of six teams each. The team with the best conference record in each division is selected to participate in the championship game. In the inaugural championship game, which took place at the end of the 2005 college football season, the Florida State Seminoles defeated Virginia Tech 27–22 at Alltel Stadium in Jacksonville, Florida. In the 2006 game, two other teams faced off as Georgia Tech played Wake Forest. Wake defeated Georgia Tech 9–6. For the 2007 game, Jacksonville was awarded a one-year extension as host, and the game remained in Jacksonville. Virginia Tech returned to the ACC Football Championship game and faced off against Boston College. Tech won the game, 30–16, and returned to the championship in 2008 to defeat Boston College again 30–12. In 2009, Georgia Tech defeated Clemson, 39–34, but was forced to vacate the ACC championship by the NCAA.

Following the 2007 game the Gator Bowl Committee—organizers of the ACC Football Championship game in Jacksonville—announced they would not seek another contract extension due to falling attendance. With Jacksonville's withdrawal from future site selection, the ACC selected Tampa, Florida and Charlotte, North Carolina as future sites of the game. The 2008 and 2009 games were held in Tampa and the 2010, 2011, 2012, and 2013 games were held in Charlotte before it was announced as the extended home of this game through at least 2019. After a political dispute led to a one-game 2016 foray to Orlando, the ACC Championship Game has been played in Charlotte ever since.

On June 28, 2022, the ACC announced that with the NCAA Division I Council ruling that conferences would no longer be required to maintain divisions in order to hold a conference championship, it would be eliminating its divisions for the 2023 season and onwards, opting instead for a 3-5-5 scheduling format instead. This means that the ACC Championship will no longer be determined by the two division winners, but will instead have the two teams with the highest conference winning percentage face each other.

As part of the College Football Playoff's expansion to 24 teams beginning in 2027, the ACC Championship will be discontinued following its 2026 edition, alongside the football championship games of the Big Ten, Big 12, and SEC. The regular season leader in the ACC will once again be crowned conference champion and awarded an automatic spot in the playoff beginning in 2027.

== Conference expansion ==
In 1990, the eight-team Atlantic Coast Conference added Florida State to the league, creating a new nine-team ACC. Though Florida State was the only school added to the conference, some league officials discussed offering one or more other schools—Navy, Pittsburgh, Syracuse, South Carolina, Miami, West Virginia, Boston College, Rutgers, or Virginia Tech—an offer to join the league. For various reasons, however, no other team was extended an offer. Throughout the 1990s, the Atlantic Coast Conference remained at nine members. Ironically, South Carolina was a charter member of the ACC that left in 1971.

The nearby Southeastern Conference (SEC), which also encompasses college football teams in the American South, also expanded in 1990. Instead of adding one team, as did the ACC, the then 10-team SEC added two—the University of Arkansas and the University of South Carolina. The expansion made the SEC the first 12-school football conference and thus the first eligible to hold a conference championship game under NCAA rules (the first game was held in 1992). The SEC enjoyed increased television ratings and revenue through the 1990s and by 2003 was earning over $100 million annually, with revenues shared out among member schools.

Officials of other leagues took note of the financial boon that followed SEC expansion to twelve teams. Atlantic Coast Conference representatives began discussing expansion to twelve schools in the first years of the new century, who began publicly pursuing the possibility of expansion anew in 2003. On May 13, 2003, representatives voted in favor of extending invitations to three schools. The only certain school was the University of Miami, while the other two spots were still being debated. Initially, the league favored admitting Miami, Syracuse University, and Boston College. After a month of debate, however, the ACC elected to extend formal invitations to Miami, Boston College, and Virginia Tech, which joined after initially being overlooked. This came years after these schools were considered for ACC membership in the early 1990s but nothing had ever came to fruition. Pittsburgh and Syracuse would also eventually join the ACC after rejections in 1990 and 2003, becoming members in 2013.

Miami and Virginia Tech began official ACC play with the 2004 college football season. After the league settled a lawsuit resulting from the departure of the three former Big East Conference teams, Boston College began ACC play in the 2005 season. With the league officially at 12 teams, it became eligible to hold a conference championship football game.

== Site selection ==
Even before the announcement proclaiming the ACC's expansion to 12 teams, several cities and sports organizations were preparing bids to host the ACC Football Championship Game. The prospect of tens of thousands of visitors could provide a multimillion-dollar economic boost for a host city and region while requiring few, if any, additional facilities. One early contender was the city of Charlotte, North Carolina. Even before Virginia Tech, Miami, and Boston College were chosen as the ACC's picks to expand, Carolinas Stadium Corporation, the owner and operator of Charlotte's Ericsson Stadium (as it was called then) lobbied heavily for Charlotte's selection. Other early options included Orlando, Tampa, Atlanta, and Jacksonville.

Shortly after negotiations for the location of the game began during the spring of 2004, the ACC announced that it had signed a new, seven-year television contract with ABC and ESPN. As part of the deal, the ACC would earn over $40 million in revenue a year in exchange for the networks' exclusive right to televise the ACC Football Championship Game along with several high-profile regular season games. Revenues would be divided among the 12 ACC member schools.

In July 2004 the ACC began deliberations about which bid to accept. On August 19, 2004, league officials announced that Jacksonville would host the game in 2005 and 2006. The league would then have the option to re-select Jacksonville for an additional one or two-year contract. Charlotte was the first runner-up in the competition.

For its first three years, the championship game was held at EverBank Field (known as Alltel Stadium in 2005 and 2006 and Jacksonville Municipal Stadium in 2007). That contract expired after the 2007 season. In December 2007, the ACC awarded the next four games to Tampa (first two) and Charlotte (next two). Raymond James Stadium was the venue for the Tampa games in 2008 and 2009, while the Bank of America Stadium provided the venue for the Charlotte games in 2010 and 2011. Charlotte hosted the game again in 2012 and 2013. In February 2014 it was announced that Charlotte would continue to host the game through at least 2019. However, in response to North Carolina's Public Facilities Privacy & Security Act (HB2), the ACC voted in September 2016 to move the 2016 championship out of North Carolina.

== Team selection ==
Following the absorption of Virginia Tech and Miami into the ACC, questions arose about how an 11-team league could fairly select participants in the conference championship game. A divisional structure involving two six-team divisions competing for two championship-game slots would not be possible. In addition, the ACC could not continue to select its champion via round-robin play since there were now 11 teams and only seven or eight conference games available per team. Even the NCAA's addition of a 12th game to the regular season did little to relieve the conference's problem. Prior to the 2004 college football season, the ACC requested a waiver to the NCAA's rule requiring conferences to have 12-plus teams before having a conference championship game. Before the season began, however, the NCAA rejected the ACC's application, and the league had to use a semi-round-robin format to select a champion during the 2004 football season. After that season, the inclusion of Boston College as the ACC's 12th team solved the problem of enabling the ACC to have a championship football game.

On October 18, 2004, the ACC announced its new football structure with two divisions. Each six-team division plays a round-robin schedule within the division and a rotation of three conference games against teams from the opposing division. The two teams with the best conference records in each division earn places to the championship game. In the event of a tie in records within one division, divisional records and the results of head-to-head games are considered.

Also, in the games between the two divisions, each team has a permanent rival team that is played every year. Hence, every year, there are these football games: Georgia Tech vs. Clemson; North Carolina vs. North Carolina State; Louisville vs. Virginia; Syracuse vs. Pittsburgh; Duke vs. Wake Forest; Florida State vs. Miami; and Boston College vs. Virginia Tech.

On July 28, 2022, the ACC announced a revised football structure, eliminating divisions entirely, coming off the heels of the NCAA Division I Council's announcement that conferences no longer need to maintain divisions to hold a championship. Instead of a divisional structure where teams play a round-robin schedule within their division, it will instead move to a 3-5-5 format. Each team will have three designated permanent matchups, who they will face every year (mostly reserved for rivalry games such as North Carolina vs. North Carolina State, Virginia vs. Virginia Tech, and Florida State vs. Miami), along with two different 5-team rotations that swap every year, such that every team will have at least one home game and one away game against every other team in a four-year cycle. Under this format, the two ACC teams with the highest conference winning percentage will be eligible to play in the championship.

Notre Dame joined the conference as a non-football member in 2014 and, while playing five ACC teams each season, is not eligible for the championship game. However, for the 2020 season, Notre Dame joined the ACC for conference play and the ACC used a division-less format for the game, with the game contested by the two teams with the best conference records.

=== Teams ===
- Boston College Eagles
- Clemson Tigers
- Cal Golden Bears
- Duke Blue Devils
- Florida State Seminoles
- Georgia Tech Yellow Jackets
- Louisville Cardinals
- Miami Hurricanes
- North Carolina Tar Heels
- North Carolina State Wolfpack
- Pittsburgh Panthers
- SMU Mustangs
- Stanford Cardinal
- Syracuse Orange
- Virginia Cavaliers
- Virginia Tech Hokies
- Wake Forest Demon Deacons

== Results ==
Below are the results from all ACC Championship Games played. The winning team appears in bold font, on a background of their primary team color. Rankings are from the AP Poll released prior to the game.

Year	Atlantic Division		Coastal Division		MVP	Attendance	Site
2005	22 **Florida State**	**27**	5 Virginia Tech	22	Willie Reid, Florida State	72,749	EverBank Field • Jacksonville, FL
2006	16 **Wake Forest**	**9**	23 Georgia Tech	6	Sam Swank, Wake Forest	62,850	EverBank Field • Jacksonville, FL
2007	12 Boston College	16	6 **Virginia Tech**	**30**	Sean Glennon, Virginia Tech	53,212	EverBank Field • Jacksonville, FL
2008	18 Boston College	12	25 **Virginia Tech**	**30**	Tyrod Taylor, Virginia Tech	53,927	Raymond James Stadium • Tampa, FL
2009	25 Clemson	34	12 **Georgia Tech**†	**39**	C. J. Spiller, Clemson	44,897	Raymond James Stadium • Tampa, FL
2010	20 Florida State	33	12 **Virginia Tech**	**44**	Tyrod Taylor, Virginia Tech	72,379	Bank of America Stadium • Charlotte, NC
2011	21 **Clemson**	**38**	5 Virginia Tech	10	Tajh Boyd, Clemson	73,675	Bank of America Stadium • Charlotte, NC
2012	13 **Florida State**	**21**	Georgia Tech	15	James Wilder Jr., Florida State	64,778	Bank of America Stadium • Charlotte, NC
2013	1 **Florida State**	**45**	20 Duke	7	Jameis Winston, Florida State	67,694	Bank of America Stadium • Charlotte, NC
2014	2 **Florida State**	**37**	12 Georgia Tech	35	Dalvin Cook, Florida State	64,808	Bank of America Stadium • Charlotte, NC
2015	1 **Clemson**	**45**	8 North Carolina	37	Deshaun Watson, Clemson	74,514	Bank of America Stadium • Charlotte, NC
2016	3 **Clemson**	**42**	19 Virginia Tech	35	Deshaun Watson, Clemson	50,628	Camping World Stadium • Orlando, FL
2017	1 **Clemson**	**38**	7 Miami (FL)	3	Kelly Bryant, Clemson	74,372	Bank of America Stadium • Charlotte, NC
2018	2 **Clemson**	**42**	Pittsburgh	10	Travis Etienne, Clemson	67,784	Bank of America Stadium • Charlotte, NC
2019	3 **Clemson**	**62**	22 Virginia	17	Tee Higgins, Clemson	66,810	Bank of America Stadium • Charlotte, NC
Year	#1 seed		#2 seed		MVP	Attendance	Bank of America Stadium • Charlotte, NC
2020	2 Notre Dame	10	3 **Clemson**	**34**	Trevor Lawrence, Clemson	5,240‡	Bank of America Stadium • Charlotte, NC
Year	Atlantic Division		Coastal Division		MVP	Attendance	Bank of America Stadium • Charlotte, NC
2021	16 Wake Forest	21	15 **Pittsburgh**	**45**	Erick Hallett, Pittsburgh	57,856	Bank of America Stadium • Charlotte, NC
2022	9 **Clemson**	**39**	23 North Carolina	10	Cade Klubnik, Clemson	64,115	Bank of America Stadium • Charlotte, NC
Year	#1 seed		#2 seed		MVP	Attendance	Bank of America Stadium • Charlotte, NC
2023	4 **Florida State**	**16**	14 Louisville	6	Lawrance Toafili, Florida State	62,314	Bank of America Stadium • Charlotte, NC
2024	8 SMU	31	17 **Clemson**	**34**	Cade Klubnik, Clemson	53,808	Bank of America Stadium • Charlotte, NC
2025	16 Virginia	20	**Duke**	**27**^{OT}	Darian Mensah, Duke	41,672	Bank of America Stadium • Charlotte, NC
2026	Miami (FL)		Wake Forest				Bank of America Stadium • Charlotte, NC

† Georgia Tech was forced to vacate their 2009 win due to NCAA violations.
‡ 2020 game attendance capped due to the COVID-19 pandemic in North Carolina.

=== Results by team ===
Appearances	School	Wins	Losses	Pct.	Year(s) Won	Year(s) Lost
10	Clemson	9	1	.900	2011, 2015, 2016, 2017, 2018, 2019, 2020, 2022, 2024	2009
6	Florida State	5	1	.833	2005, 2012, 2013, 2014, 2023	2010
6	Virginia Tech	3	3	.500	2007, 2008, 2010	2005, 2011, 2016
4	Georgia Tech	1	3	.250	2009†	2006, 2012, 2014
3	Wake Forest	1	1	.500	2006	2021
2	Pittsburgh	1	1	.500	2021	2018
2	Duke	1	1	.500	2025	2013
2	Boston College	0	2	.000		2007, 2008
2	North Carolina	0	2	.000		2015, 2022
2	Virginia	0	2	.000		2019, 2025
2	Miami (FL)	0	1	.000		2017
1	Notre Dame	0	1	.000		2020
1	Louisville	0	1	.000		2023
1	SMU	0	1	.000		2024

=== No results by team ===
School
California
Maryland
NC State
Stanford
Syracuse

- California, North Carolina State, Stanford, and Syracuse never made an appearance in an ACC Football Championship Game.
- Maryland never made an appearance in an ACC Football Championship Game prior to moving to the Big Ten Conference in 2014.

=== Rematches ===
The ACC Championship game has featured a rematch of a regular-season game a total of six times (2007, 2008, 2009, 2011, 2020, 2025). The team which won the regular-season game is 2–4 in the rematches, winning in 2009 and 2011 but losing in 2007, 2008, 2020, and 2025.

=== Common matchups ===
Matchups that have occurred more than once:

# of Times	Atlantic Division	Coastal Division	Record	Years Played
2	Boston College	Virginia Tech	Virginia Tech, 2–0	2007, 2008
2	Clemson	North Carolina	Clemson, 2–0	2015, 2022
2	Clemson	Virginia Tech	Clemson, 2–0	2011, 2016
2	Florida State	Georgia Tech	Florida State, 2–0	2012, 2014
2	Florida State	Virginia Tech	Tied, 1–1	2005, 2010

== Game records ==
Team	Record, Team vs. Opponent	Year
Most points scored (one team)	62, Clemson vs. Virginia	2019
Most points scored (losing team)	37, North Carolina vs. Clemson	2015
Fewest points scored (winning team)	9, Wake Forest vs. Georgia Tech	2006
Fewest points scored	3, Miami vs. Clemson	2017
Most points scored (both teams)	82, Clemson (45) vs. North Carolina (37)	2015
Fewest points scored (both teams)	15, Wake Forest (9) vs. Georgia Tech (6)	2006
Most points scored in a half	31, Clemson (both halves) vs. Virginia	2019
Most points scored in a half (both teams)	49, Florida State vs. Georgia Tech (1st half)	2014
Largest margin of victory	45, Clemson (62) vs. Virginia (17)	2019
Smallest margin of victory	2, Florida State (37) vs. Georgia Tech (35)	2014
Total yards	619, Clemson (408 passing, 211 rushing) vs. Virginia	2019
Rushing yards	333, Georgia Tech vs. Clemson	2009
Passing yards	408, Clemson vs. Virginia	2019
First downs	33, Clemson vs. North Carolina	2015
Fewest yards allowed	188, Florida State vs. Louisville (111 passing, 77 rushing)	2023
Fewest rushing yards allowed	41, Florida State vs. Virginia Tech	2005
Fewest passing yards allowed	8, Clemson vs. Pittsburgh	2018
Individual	Record, Player, Team vs. Opponent	Year
All-purpose yards	420, Deshaun Watson, Clemson vs. North Carolina	2015
Touchdowns (all-purpose)	5, shared by: Deshaun Watson, Clemson vs. North Carolina; Deshaun Watson, Clemson vs. Virginia Tech	2015; 2016
Rushing yards	233, C. J. Spiller, Clemson vs. Georgia Tech	2009
Rushing touchdowns	4, C. J. Spiller, Clemson vs. Georgia Tech	2009
Passing yards	335, Marcus Vick, Virginia Tech vs. Florida State	2005
Passing touchdowns	4, Trevor Lawrence, Clemson vs. Virginia	2019
Receiving yards	182, Tee Higgins, Clemson vs. Virginia	2019
Receiving touchdowns	3, Tee Higgins, Clemson vs. Virginia	2019
Tackles	15, shared by: Jon Abbate, Wake Forest vs. Georgia Tech; Kobe Wilson, SMU vs. Clemson	2006; 2024
Sacks	3, shared by: Jeremiah Trotter Jr., Clemson vs. North Carolina; Braden Fiske, Florida State vs. Louisville	2022; 2023
Interceptions	2, shared by: Cordrea Tankersley, Clemson vs. Virginia Tech; Erick Hallett, Pittsburgh vs. Wake Forest	2016; 2021
Long Plays	Record, Player, Team vs. Opponent	Year
Touchdown run	75, Travis Etienne, Clemson vs. Pittsburgh	2018
Touchdown pass	70, Demaryius Thomas from Joshua Nesbitt, Georgia Tech vs. Clemson	2009
Kickoff return	44, Kermit Whitfield, Florida State vs. Duke	2013
Punt return	83, Willie Reid, Florida State vs. Virginia Tech	2005
Interception return	98, Nate Wiggins, Clemson vs. North Carolina	2022
Fumble return	52, Jamie Silva, Boston College vs. Virginia Tech	2007
Punt	63, Will Spiers, Clemson vs. Pittsburgh	2018
Field goal	56, Nolan Hauser, Clemson vs. SMU	2024
Miscellaneous	Record, Team vs. Team	Year
Game attendance	74,514, Clemson vs. North Carolina	2015

== See also ==
- List of NCAA Division I FBS conference championship games
