= 2022 Orange Bowl =

Postseason college football bowl game

2022 Capital One Orange Bowl
- CFP New Year's Six; 89th Orange Bowl
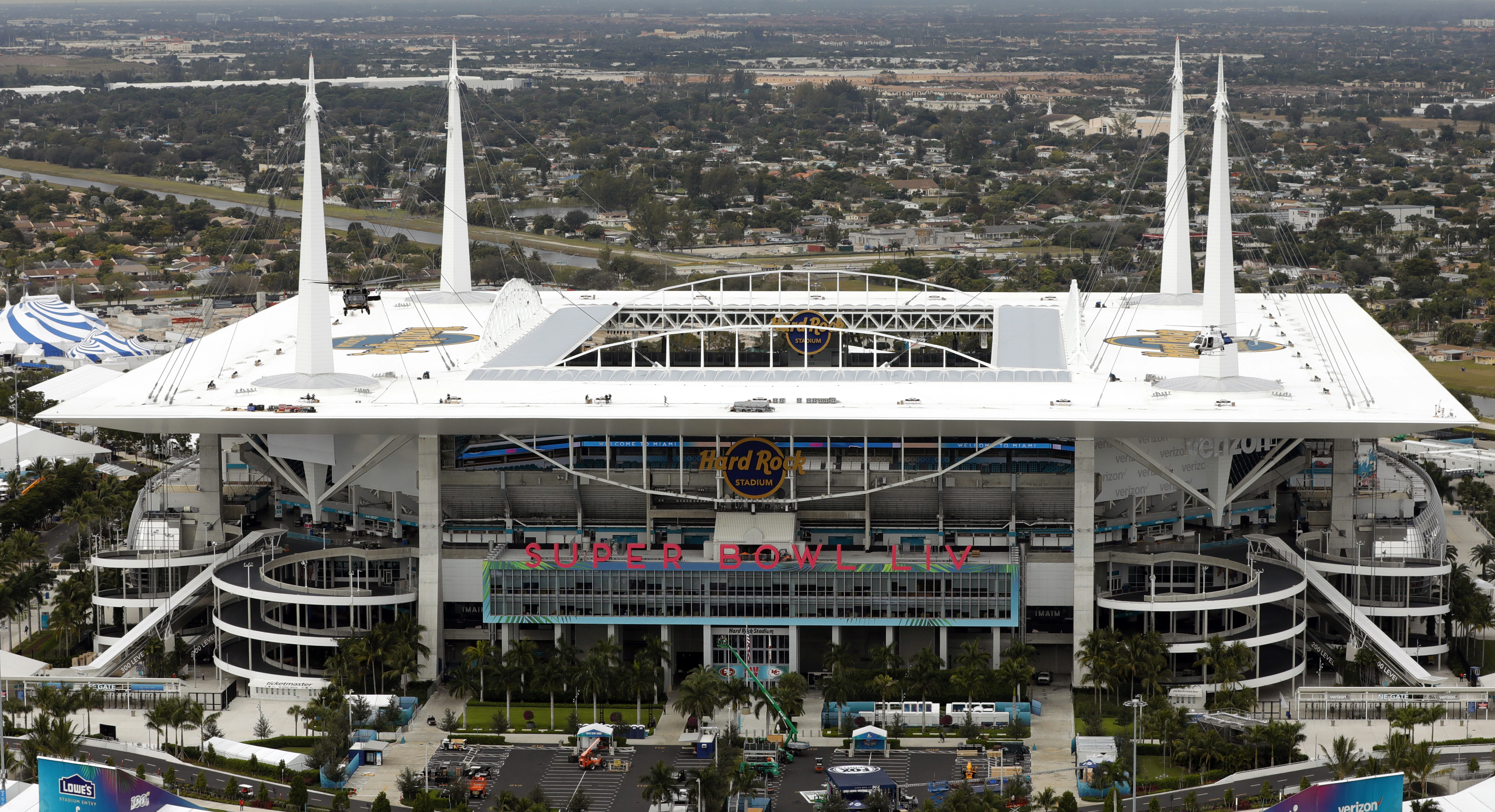
- Hard Rock Stadium in Miami Gardens, Florida, hosted the Orange Bowl.
Tennessee Volunteers	Clemson Tigers
(10–2)	(11–2)
SEC	ACC
31	14
Head coach: Josh Heupel	Head coach: Dabo Swinney
AP / Coaches / CFP; 6 / 6 / 6	AP / Coaches / CFP; 10 / 11 / 7
	1	2	3	4	Total
Tennessee	7	7	7	10	31
Clemson	0	3	3	8	14
- Date: December 30, 2022
- Season: 2022
- Stadium: Hard Rock Stadium
- Location: Miami Gardens, Florida
- MVP: Joe Milton (QB, Tennessee)
- Favorite: Clemson by 4
- National anthem: Brooke Sterling
- Referee: Ron Snodgrass (Big Ten)
- Halftime show: Fitz and the Tantrums
- Attendance: 63,912

United States TV coverage
- Network: ESPN
- Announcers: Joe Tessitore (play-by-play), Greg McElroy (analyst), and Katie George (sideline)

International TV coverage
- Network: ESPN Deportes

The 2022 Orange Bowl was a college football bowl game played on December 30, 2022, at Hard Rock Stadium in Miami Gardens, Florida. The 89th annual Orange Bowl, the game featured Clemson from the Atlantic Coast Conference (ACC) and Tennessee from the Southeastern Conference (SEC). The game began at 8:11 p.m. EST and was aired on ESPN. It was one of the 2022–23 bowl games concluding the 2022 FBS football season. Sponsored by bank holding company Capital One, the game was officially known as the Capital One Orange Bowl.

== Teams ==
This game featured the No. 6 College Football Playoff (CFP) ranked team, Tennessee of the Southeastern Conference (SEC), and the No. 7 CFP ranked team, Clemson of the Atlantic Coast Conference (ACC).

=== Tennessee ===
Tennessee received a New Year's Six bid after finishing the regular season ranked higher than Power 5 champions Kansas State, Utah, and Clemson. The Volunteers started their regular season with eight consecutive wins, reaching No. 1 in the first College Football Playoff rankings. They then lost two of their final four games, suffering defeats by Georgia and South Carolina. Tennessee entered the bowl with an overall 10–2 record (6–2 in conference).

=== Clemson ===
Clemson received a New Year's Six bid after winning the ACC championship. The Tigers began their season with eight consecutive wins, reaching No. 5 in major poll rankings, then lost two of their final four regular-season games. Their defeats came against Notre Dame and South Carolina. Clemson qualified for the ACC Championship Game, where they defeated North Carolina, 39–10. Clemson entered the bowl with an overall 11–2 record (8–0 in conference).

== Game summary ==
2022 Capital One Orange Bowl

Quarter	1	2	3	4	Total
No. 6 Tennessee	7	7	7	10	31
No. 7 Clemson	0	3	3	8	14

at Hard Rock Stadium • Miami Gardens, Florida

- Date: December 30, 2022
- Game time: 8:00 p.m. EST
- Game weather: Clear • Temperature: 74 °F (23 °C) • Wind: 7 mph (11 km/h) southeast
- Game attendance: 63,912
- Referee: Ron Snodgrass
- TV announcers (ESPN): Joe Tessitore (play-by-play), Greg McElroy (analyst), and Katie George (sideline)
- Box score

Scoring summary

Quarter	Time	Drive			Team	Scoring information	Score	
Quarter	Time	Plays	Yards	TOP	Team	Scoring information	Tennessee	Clemson
1	5:17	12	75	4:01	Tennessee	Bru McCoy 16-yard touchdown reception from Joe Milton, Chase McGrath kick good	7	0
2	9:03	5	75	1:12	Tennessee	Jabari Small 2-yard touchdown run, Chase McGrath kick good	14	0
2	5:11	10	46	3:52	Clemson	31-yard field goal by B.T. Potter	14	3
3	10:57	10	45	4:03	Clemson	40-yard field goal by B.T. Potter	14	6
3	0:05	4	70	1:22	Tennessee	Squirrel White 14-yard touchdown reception from Joe Milton, Chase McGrath kick good	21	6
4	10:01	12	71	5:04	Clemson	Cade Klubnik 4-yard touchdown run, 2-point rush good	21	14
4	8:34	6	75	1:27	Tennessee	Ramel Keyton 46-yard touchdown reception from Joe Milton, Chase McGrath kick good	28	14
4	3:07	6	23	2:41	Tennessee	32-yard field goal by Chase McGrath	31	14
"TOP" = time of possession. For other American football terms, see Glossary of American football.							31	14

== Statistics ==
Team statistical comparison
Statistic	Tennessee	Clemson
First downs	21	34
First downs rushing	6	10
First downs passing	12	20
First downs penalty	3	4
Third down efficiency	3–13	7–19
Fourth down efficiency	0–0	0–3
Total plays–net yards	66–375	101–484
Rushing attempts–net yards	38–124	45–164
Yards per rush	3.3	3.6
Yards passing	251	320
Pass completions–attempts	19–28	30–56
Interceptions thrown	0	2
Punt returns–total yards	1–9	0–0
Kickoff returns–total yards	2–41	4–89
Punts–average yardage	8–39.6	3–40.7
Fumbles–lost	0–0	0–0
Penalties–yards	9–94	4–30
Time of possession	23:37	36:23

Tennessee statistics
Volunteers passing
	C–A	Yds	TD–INT
Joe Milton	19–28	251	3–0
Volunteers rushing
	Car	Yds	TD
Jaylen Wright	11	89	0
Jabari Small	13	38	1
Joe Milton	11	5	0
TEAM	3	−8	0
Volunteers receiving
	Rec	Yds	TD
Squirrel White	9	108	1
Ramel Keyton	4	76	
Bru McCoy	4	48	1
Princeton Fant	2	19	0

Clemson statistics
Tigers passing
	C–A	Yds	TD–INT
Cade Klubnik	30–54	320	0–2
TEAM	0–1	0	0–0
Davis Allen	0–1	0	0–0
Tigers rushing
	Car	Yds	TD
Will Shipley	17	72	0
Cade Klubnik	20	51	1
Phil Mafah	7	39	0
Drew Swinney	1	2	0
Tigers receiving
	Rec	Yds	TD
Joseph Ngata	8	84	0
Cole Turner	4	51	0
Davis Allen	4	49	0
Adam Randall	3	44	0
Antonio Williams	3	41	0
Jake Briningstool	3	29	0
Will Shipley	4	21	0
Phil Mafah	1	1	0
