= Joe Milton =

American football player (born 2000)

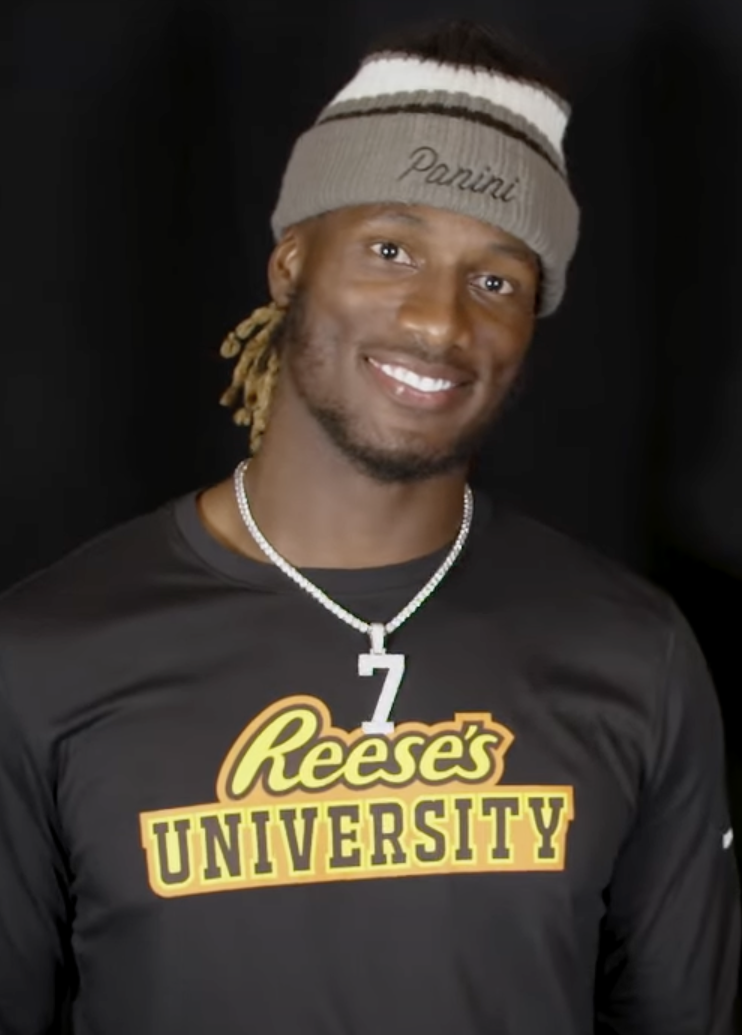
- Milton in 2024

No. 14 – Philadelphia Eagles
- Position: Quarterback
- Roster status: Active

Personal information
- Born: March 6, 2000 (age 26); Pahokee, Florida, U.S.
- Listed height: 6 ft 5 in (1.96 m)
- Listed weight: 236 lb (107 kg)

Career information
- High school: Olympia (Orlando, Florida)
- College: Michigan (2018–2020); Tennessee (2021–2023)
- NFL draft: 2024: 6th round, 193rd overall pick

Career history
- New England Patriots (2024); Dallas Cowboys (2025–2026); Philadelphia Eagles (2026–present)

Career NFL statistics as of Week 9, 2026
- Passing attempts: 87
- Passing completions: 55
- Completion percentage: 63.2%
- TD–INT: 3–2
- Passing yards: 593
- Passer rating: 81.2
- Rushing yards: 130
- Rushing touchdowns: 1
- Stats at Pro Football Reference

Joseph Jay Milton III (born March 6, 2000) is an American professional football quarterback for the Philadelphia Eagles of the National Football League (NFL). He played college football for the Michigan Wolverines and Tennessee Volunteers before being selected by the New England Patriots in the sixth round of the 2024 NFL draft. He has also played for the Dallas Cowboys.

== Early life ==
Milton attended Olympia High School in Orlando, Florida. He committed to the University of Michigan to play college football.

== College career ==
=== Michigan ===
Milton spent his first two years at Michigan (2018, 2019) as a backup to starter Shea Patterson. During those two years, he played in eight games, completing 6 of 11 passes for 117 yards, one touchdown, two interceptions and also had two rushing touchdowns.

Milton competed with Dylan McCaffrey to be Michigan's starter in 2020. Milton was considered the favorite after McCaffrey decided to transfer. Due to the COVID-19 pandemic, Michigan's season was shortened to only six games. Milton started the first three games but steadily lost more playing time to Cade McNamara as the season progressed. Milton passed for 1,077 yards, four passing touchdowns, and four interceptions to go along with 38 carries for 109 rushing yards and one rushing touchdown in Michigan's 2–4 season.

=== Tennessee ===
Milton transferred to Tennessee, where he was named the team's starter going into the 2021 season. During the Volunteers' second game of the season against Pittsburgh, Milton suffered an injury, and Hendon Hooker, a fellow transfer quarterback from Virginia Tech, replaced him in the lineup. He recorded a passing touchdown against #1 Georgia in relief in the 41–17 loss on November 13. Milton played in a relief role in six games for the rest of the 2021 season.

In the 2022 season, Hooker was the primary starter for the 11–2 Volunteers. Milton played the backup role for most of the season. He had productive outings in relief of Hooker with multiple games going over 100 yards passing and scoring at least one passing touchdown. On November 19, against South Carolina, Hooker sustained a season-ending ACL injury, making Milton the starter for the rest of the season. Milton made his first start of the season against Vanderbilt. He passed for 147 yards and a touchdown in the 56–0 victory. Tennessee qualified for the Orange Bowl against #7 Clemson. In the game, Milton passed for 251 yards and three touchdowns in the 31–14 victory to earn MVP honors.

Milton began the 2023 season as the Volunteers' starting quarterback. He threw for two passing touchdowns and ran for two rushing touchdowns in a 49–13 victory over Virginia. Following three total touchdowns in a 30–13 win over Austin Peay, Milton and the Vols had their first setback against Florida on September 16, when they lost 29–16. To start Tennessee's 45–14 victory over UTSA in the following game, Milton had an 81-yard rushing touchdown on the Vols' first offensive drive. The play marked the longest rushing play by a quarterback in program history. Following conference victories over South Carolina and Texas A&M, Milton had 271 yards and two passing touchdowns in a loss to Alabama. In a critical Nov. 11 game in Columbia, Mo., between No. 13 Tennessee and No. 14 Missouri, Milton and the Tennessee offense were only able to score one second-quarter touchdown as they lost 36–7.

A week later, against No. 1 Georgia, Milton and Tennessee were again defeated handily, 38–10. Joe Milton did not throw a touchdown.

Milton passed for 383 yards and four touchdowns to go along with two rushing touchdowns in a 48–24 victory over Vanderbilt to end the regular season. The performance marked the most touchdowns accounted for by a Volunteer in a single game since 2009. Milton finished his final season with the Volunteers with an 8–4 record after deciding to opt out of the Volunteers' bowl game.

=== College statistics ===
Season	Team	Games			Passing								Rushing			
Season	Team	GP	GS	Record	Cmp	Att	Pct	Yds	Avg	TD	Int	Rtg	Att	Yds	Avg	TD
2018	Michigan	4	0	—	3	4	75.0	58	14.5	0	1	146.8	7	31	4.4	1
2019	Michigan	4	0	—	3	7	42.9	59	8.4	1	1	132.2	5	16	3.2	1
2020	Michigan	6	5	2–3	80	141	56.7	1,077	7.6	4	4	124.6	38	109	2.9	1
2021	Tennessee	8	2	1–1	27	55	49.1	375	6.0	2	0	113.5	28	129	4.6	2
2022	Tennessee	9	2	2–0	53	82	64.6	971	11.8	10	0	204.3	18	77	4.3	0
2023	Tennessee	12	12	8–4	226	348	64.5	2,769	7.2	20	5	141.4	75	292	3.9	6
Career		43	21	13–8	329	540	60.9	4,303	8.0	37	11	142.5	153	620	4.1	11

== Professional career ==
Pre-draft measurables
Height	Weight	Arm length	Hand span	Wingspan	40-yard dash	Vertical jump	Broad jump
6 ft 5 1/8 in (1.96 m)	235 lb (107 kg)	33 3/8 in (0.85 m)	10 1/4 in (0.26 m)	6 ft 8 in (2.03 m)	4.62 s	35.0 in (0.89 m)	10 ft 1 in (3.07 m)
All values from NFL Combine/Pro Day

=== New England Patriots ===
Milton was selected by the New England Patriots in the sixth round (193rd overall) of the 2024 NFL draft. The Patriots obtained the pick by trading quarterback Mac Jones to the Jacksonville Jaguars. Milton signed his rookie contract with the Patriots on May 10, 2024. Milton was named the third-string quarterback behind Jacoby Brissett and fellow rookie Drake Maye to start the 2024 season.

On January 5, 2025, Milton made his professional debut in the season finale against the Buffalo Bills after relieving Maye, who departed after the opening drive. Milton finished 22-of-29 for 241 yards and accounted for two touchdowns as the Patriots won 23–16, knocking them out of contention for the first overall pick in the 2025 NFL draft.

=== Dallas Cowboys ===
On April 3, 2025, the Patriots traded Milton to the Dallas Cowboys along with a 2025 seventh-round pick in exchange for a 2025 fifth-round pick. In a backup role to Dak Prescott, he appeared in four games. He passed for 183 yards, one touchdown, and two interceptions.

On August 31, 2026, Dallas waived Milton after he lost the backup quarterback job to Sam Howell. On September 2, Dallas re–signed Milton to their practice squad.

=== Philadelphia Eagles ===
On October 16, 2026, the Philadelphia Eagles signed Milton off of the Cowboys' practice squad following an injury to Eagles starting quarterback Jalen Hurts. After the Eagles Week 8 loss to the Commanders on Monday he was named the starter for Week 9 versus the Giants with starter Tanner McKee being benched after 3 straight losses. Milton threw for 169 yards in the 19-11 loss.

=== NFL statistics ===
Year	Team	Games			Passing									Rushing					Sacks		Fumbles	
Year	Team	GP	GS	Record	Cmp	Att	Pct	Yds	Y/A	Lng	TD	Int	Rtg	Att	Yds	Avg	Lng	TD	Sck	SckY	Fum	Lost
2024	NE	1	0	–	22	29	75.9	241	8.3	48	1	0	111.4	10	16	1.6	9	1	0	0	1	1
2025	DAL	4	0	–	15	24	62.5	183	8.0	35	1	2	65.1	5	50	10.0	23	0	0	0	1	1
2026	PHI	1	1	0–1	18	34	52.9	169	5.0	20	0	0	66.9	9	64	7.1	24	0	0	0	1	0
Career		6	1	0–1	55	87	63.2	593	6.8	20	2	2	81.2	24	130	5.4	24	1	0	0	2	2

== Personal life ==
Milton's cousin is former NFL player Anquan Boldin.
