= DeMonte Capehart =

American football player (born 2002)

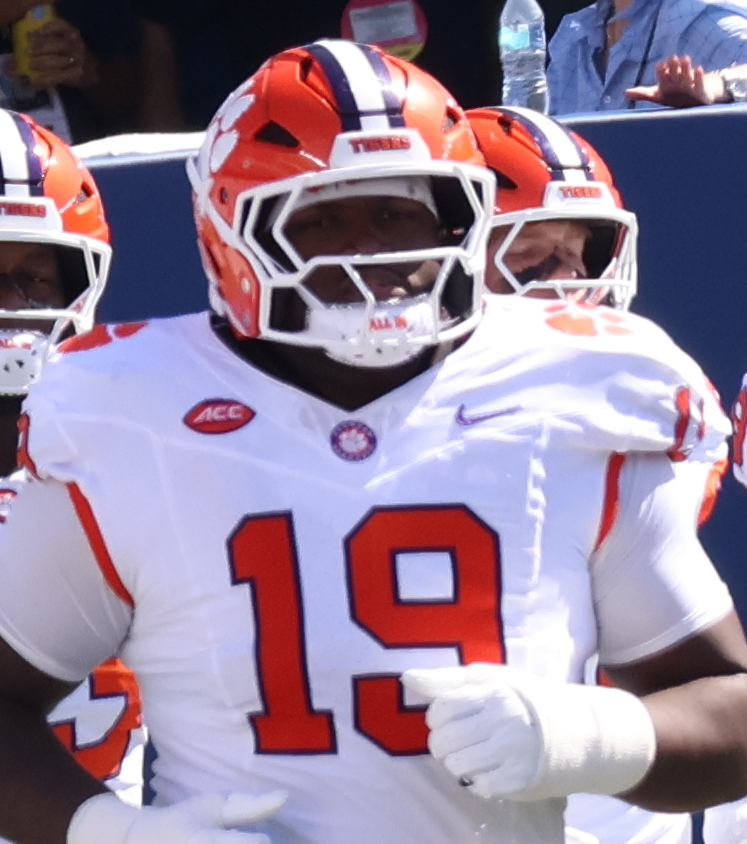

No. 90 – Tampa Bay Buccaneers
- Position: Defensive tackle
- Roster status: Active

Personal information
- Born: July 19, 2002 (age 24); Hartsville, South Carolina, U.S.
- Listed height: 6 ft 5 in (1.96 m)
- Listed weight: 313 lb (142 kg)

Career information
- High school: IMG Academy (Bradenton, Florida)
- College: Clemson (2020–2025)
- NFL draft: 2026: 5th round, 155th overall pick

Career history
- Tampa Bay Buccaneers (2026–present)
- Stats at Pro Football Reference

DeMonte Capehart (born July 19, 2002) is an American professional football defensive tackle for the Tampa Bay Buccaneers of the National Football League (NFL). He played college football for the Clemson Tigers.

== Early life ==
Capehart was born on July 19, 2002 in Hartsville, South Carolina. Capehart originally attended Hartsville High School before transferring to IMG Academy in Bradenton, Florida for his senior year. As a senior, he was named a high school All-American by Sports Illustrated after recording 44 tackles and 5.5 sacks. Capehart was selected to play in the 2020 Under Armour All-America Game. He committed to Clemson University to play college football.

== College career ==
Over his first four years at Clemson from 2020 to 2023, Capehart played in 34 games as a backup and had 30 tackles and two sacks. He returned to Clemson in 2024 as a starter for the first time.

=== College statistics ===
Year	Team	Games	Tackles				
Year	Team	Games	Total	Solo	Ast	TFL	Sacks
2020	Clemson	4	3	2	1	2	1.0
2021	Clemson	5	0	0	0	0	0.0
2022	Clemson	13	12	6	6	2	0.0
2023	Clemson	12	15	12	3	5	1.0
2024	Clemson	11	21	11	10	1.5	0.0
2025	Clemson	12	21	12	9	3.0	1.0
Career		57	72	43	29	13.5	3.0

== Professional career ==
Pre-draft measurables
Height	Weight	Arm length	Hand span	Wingspan	40-yard dash	10-yard split	20-yard split	Vertical jump	Broad jump
6 ft 4 7/8 in (1.95 m)	313 lb (142 kg)	33 7/8 in (0.86 m)	10 1/4 in (0.26 m)	6 ft 10 3/4 in (2.10 m)	4.85 s	1.71 s	2.81 s	33.5 in (0.85 m)	8 ft 11 in (2.72 m)
All values from NFL Combine

Capehart was selected by the Tampa Bay Buccaneers in the fifth round with the 155th overall pick of the 2026 NFL Draft.
