= Cade Klubnik =

American football player (born 2003)

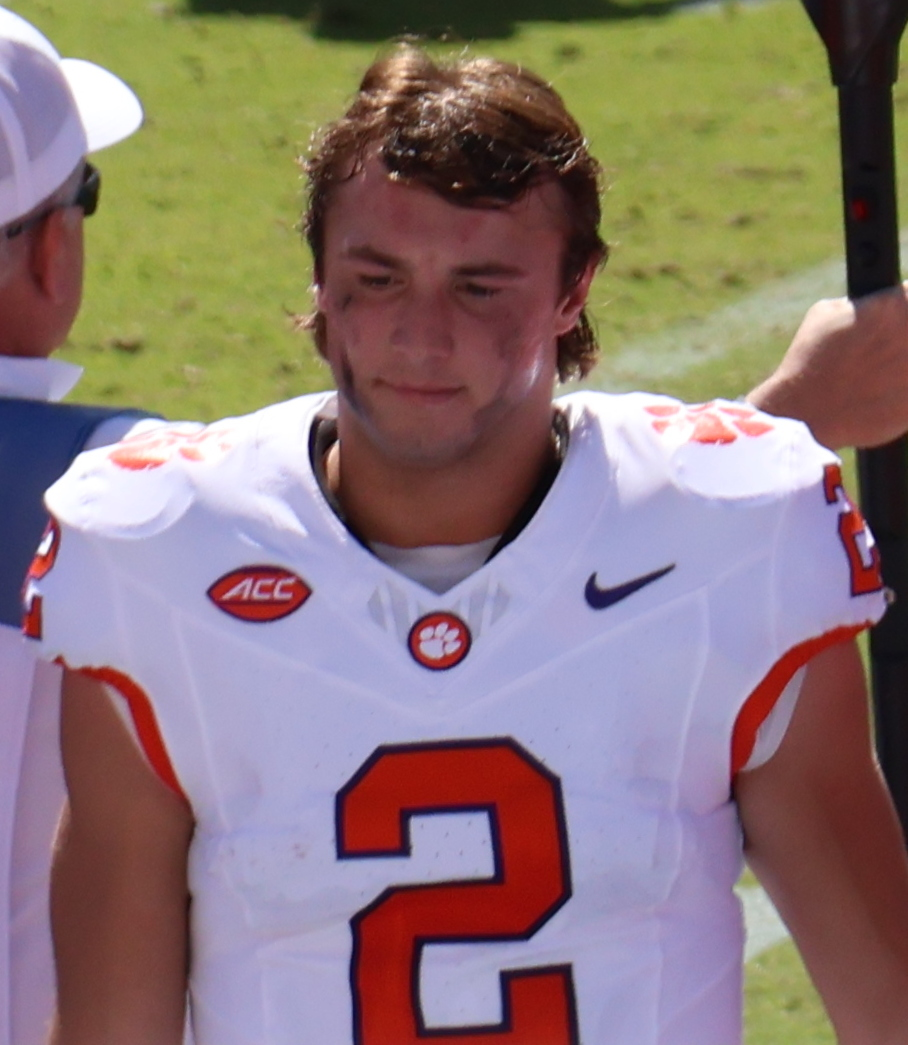
- Klubnik with the Clemson Tigers in 2025

No. 10 – New York Jets
- Position: Quarterback
- Roster status: Active

Personal information
- Born: October 10, 2003 (age 23)
- Listed height: 6 ft 2 in (1.88 m)
- Listed weight: 207 lb (94 kg)

Career information
- High school: Westlake (Austin, Texas)
- College: Clemson (2022–2025)
- NFL draft: 2026: 4th round, 110th overall pick

Career history
- New York Jets (2026–present)

Awards and highlights
- 2× ACC Championship Game MVP (2022, 2024)

Career NFL statistics as of Week 10, 2026
- Passing attempts: 20
- Passing completions: 11
- Completion percentage: 55.0%
- TD–INT: 0–1
- Passing yards: 137
- Passer rating: 55.6
- Stats at Pro Football Reference

Cade Klubnik (born October 10, 2003) is an American professional football quarterback for the New York Jets of the National Football League (NFL). He played college football for the Clemson Tigers and was selected by the Jets in the fourth round of the 2026 NFL draft.

== Early life ==
Klubnik attended Westlake High School in Austin, Texas. During his high school career he passed for 7,426 yards with 86 touchdowns and seven interceptions and won three state championships. Klubnik set the school's record for career passing yards and touchdowns, surpassing the totals of NFL quarterbacks Drew Brees, Nick Foles and Sam Ehlinger. In summer 2021 before his senior year, he was named the MVP of the Elite 11. As a senior he was named the All-American Bowl Player of the Year, MaxPreps Player of the Year and was the Gatorade Football Player of the Year for Texas.

A five-star recruit, Klubnik was rated as the top quarterback in his class and committed to Clemson University to play college football.

== College career ==
Klubnik enrolled early at Clemson in January 2022.

Throughout Klubnik's freshman season, he was used primarily as a backup to DJ Uiagalelei. During Clemson's opening game against Georgia Tech in 2022, Klubnik passed for 49 yards and a touchdown. He saw significant action in relief of a benched Uiagalelei against Syracuse, a game which Clemson won narrowly in a 27–21 comeback.

In the ACC Championship Game, he entered the game after Uiagalelei was benched following the second series. He passed for 279 yards and a touchdown in the 39–10 win over North Carolina. He was their starter in the 2022 Orange Bowl against Tennessee due to Uiagalelei entering the transfer portal. Klubnik had to deal with constant pressure from Tennessee's defense. Despite the pressure, he helped lead Clemson to numerous scoring opportunities that did not result in points. He got sacked four times and threw two interceptions to go along with 320 passing yards. Tennessee won the 2022 Orange Bowl 31–14.

=== Statistics ===
Season	Team	Games			Passing								Rushing			
Season	Team	GP	GS	Record	Cmp	Att	Pct	Yds	Avg	TD	Int	Rate	Att	Yds	Avg	TD
2022	Clemson	10	1	0–1	61	100	61.0	697	7.0	2	3	120.1	42	139	3.3	2
2023	Clemson	13	13	9–4	290	454	63.9	2,844	6.3	19	9	126.3	125	182	1.5	4
2024	Clemson	14	14	10–4	308	486	63.4	3,639	7.5	36	6	148.2	119	463	3.9	7
2025	Clemson	12	12	7–5	257	392	65.6	2,943	7.5	16	6	139.0	83	94	1.1	4
Career		49	40	26–14	916	1,432	64.0	10,132	7.1	73	24	136.8	369	878	2.4	17

== Professional career ==
Pre-draft measurables
Height	Weight	Arm length	Hand span	Wingspan	40-yard dash	10-yard split	20-yard split	Vertical jump
6 ft 2 1/4 in (1.89 m)	207 lb (94 kg)	31 1/8 in (0.79 m)	9 1/4 in (0.23 m)	6 ft 5 1/4 in (1.96 m)	4.70 s	1.58 s	2.77 s	33.5 in (0.85 m)
All values from NFL Combine/Pro Day

Klubnik was selected by the New York Jets in the fourth round (110th overall) of the 2026 NFL draft.

As a rookie, Klubnik was the backup quarterback to Geno Smith. His first regular season appearance came during Week 10 against the Buffalo Bills, where he completed 11 out of 20 passes for 137 yards and an interception as the Jets lost 12–31.

== Personal life ==
Klubnik is a Christian. He is engaged to longtime girlfriend Macey Matthews.
