= T. J. Moore =

American football player (born 2006)

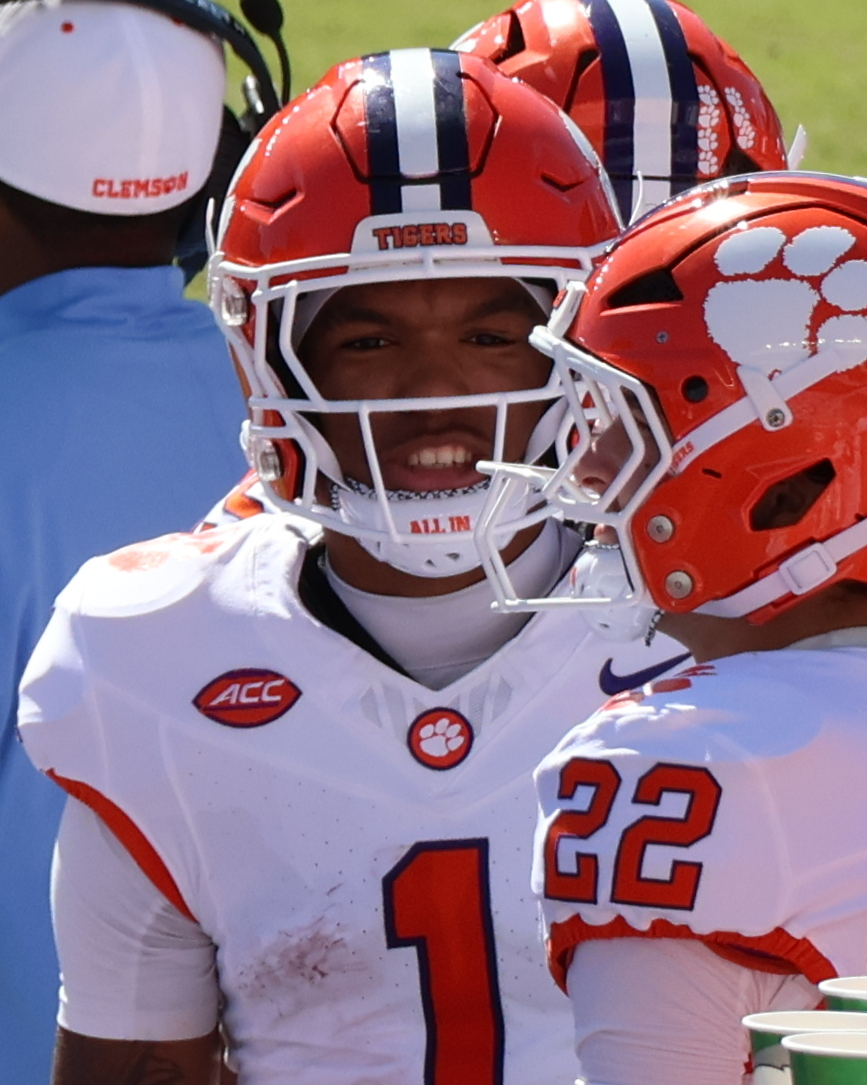
- Moore with the Clemson Tigers in 2025

No. 1 – Clemson Tigers
- Position: Wide receiver
- Class: Junior

Personal information
- Born: April 14, 2006 (age 20)
- Listed height: 6 ft 3 in (1.91 m)
- Listed weight: 205 lb (93 kg)

Career information
- High school: Tampa Catholic (Tampa, Florida)
- College: Clemson (2024–present)
- Stats at ESPN

Terrance Moore (born April 14, 2006) is an American college football wide receiver for the Clemson Tigers.

== Early life ==
Moore attended Tampa Catholic High School in Tampa, Florida. He had 42 receptions for 1,021 yards with 12 touchdowns as a junior and 50 receptions for 1,272 yards and 17 touchdowns his senior year. Moore was selected to play in the 2024 All-American Bowl, where he had two touchdown receptions. A five-star recruit, he committed to Clemson University to play college football.

== College career ==
Moore entered his true freshman year with the Tigers as a backup before earning more playing time as the season went on. He had his first career touchdown reception in the second game of the season against the Appalachian State Mountaineers.

=== College statistics ===
Year	Team	GP	Receiving			
Year	Team	GP	Rec	Yds	Avg	TD
2024	Clemson	14	45	651	14.5	5
2025	Clemson	13	52	837	16.1	4
Career		27	97	1,488	15.3	9
