= Nolan Hauser =

American football player (born 2005)

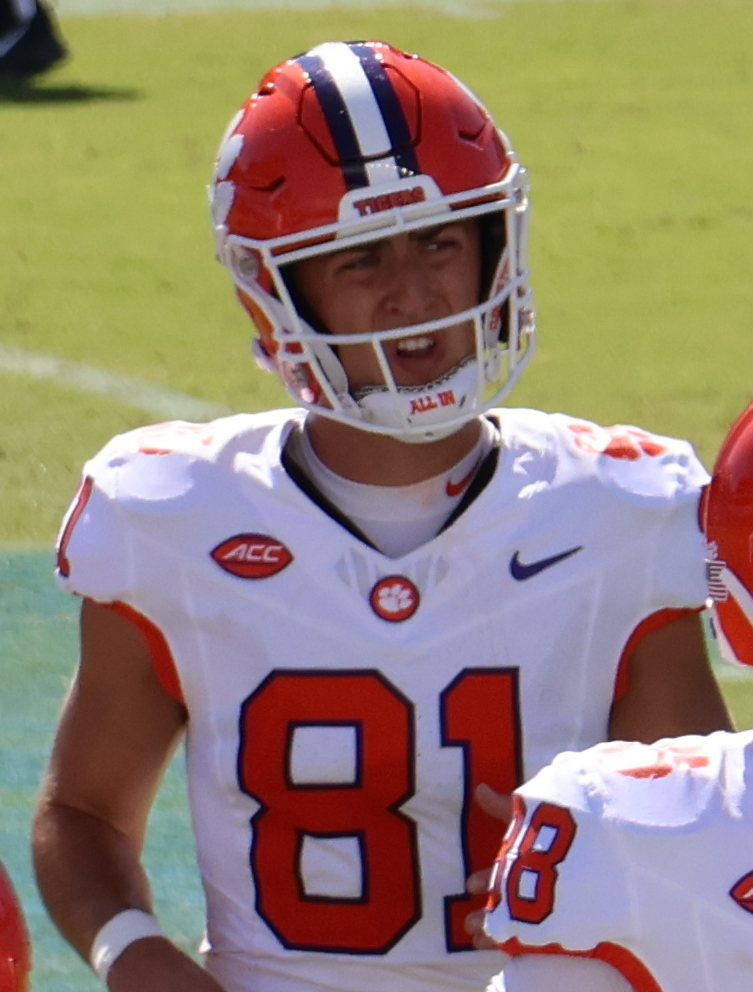
- Hauser with the Clemson Tigers in 2025

No. 81 – Clemson Tigers
- Position: Placekicker
- Class: Junior

Personal information
- Born: May 21, 2005 (age 21)
- Listed height: 6 ft 1 in (1.85 m)
- Listed weight: 195 lb (88 kg)

Career information
- High school: William A. Hough (Cornelius, North Carolina)
- College: Clemson (2024–present)
- Stats at ESPN

Nolan Hauser (/huːzər/ HOO-zər; born May 21, 2005) is an American college football kicker for the Clemson Tigers.

== Early life ==
Hauser attended William A. Hough High School in Cornelius, North Carolina. He set the national high school record for career field goals made with 66. Coming out of high school, he was rated the fourth best kicking recruit by 247Sports and committed to play college football for the Clemson Tigers.

== College career ==
Heading into the 2024 season, Hauser competed for the starting kicker job with Robert Gunn III. Ultimately, he beat out Gunn III for the starting kicker job for the team's week one matchup versus Georgia. In the 2024 ACC Championship Game, Hauser hit a walk-off game-winning 56-yard field goal in a 34-31 victory over SMU to clinch a playoff bid for the Tigers. He finished the 2024 season, hitting on 18 of his 24 field goal attempts, while making 59 of his 60 extra points, and was named the FWAA freshman special teams player of the year. Heading into the 2025 season, Hauser was named to the Lou Groza Award watch list.

=== Statistics ===
Year	Team	GP	Kicking							Punting		
Year	Team	GP	XPM	XPA	XP%	FGM	FGA	FG%	Pts	Pnt	Yds	Y/P
2024	Clemson	14	59	60	98.3%	18	24	75%	113	0	0	0.0
2025	Clemson	13	38	38	100%	17	21	81%	89	2	55	27.5
Career		27	97	98	99%	35	45	77.8%	202	2	55	27.5

== Personal life ==
Hauser is the son of Clemson pitcher Scott Hauser and Clemson All-American soccer player Sheri Bueter Hauser, while his sister Ella currently players for the Clemson soccer team.
