= Antonio Williams (wide receiver) =

American football player (born 2004)

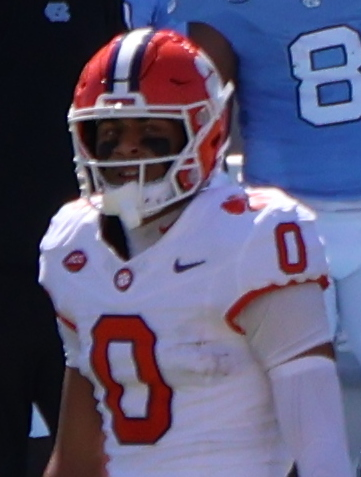
- Williams with the Clemson Tigers in 2025

No. 14 – Washington Commanders
- Position: Wide receiver
- Roster status: Active

Personal information
- Born: July 14, 2004 (age 22)
- Listed height: 5 ft 11 in (1.80 m)
- Listed weight: 195 lb (88 kg)

Career information
- High school: Dutch Fork (Irmo, South Carolina)
- College: Clemson (2022–2025)
- NFL draft: 2026: 3rd round, 71st overall pick

Career history
- Washington Commanders (2026–present)

Awards and highlights
- First-team All-ACC (2024); Third-team All-ACC (2025)

Career NFL statistics as of Week 10, 2026
- Receptions: 28
- Receiving yards: 326
- Receiving touchdowns: 2
- Stats at Pro Football Reference

Antonio Williams (born July 14, 2004) is an American professional football wide receiver for the Washington Commanders of the National Football League (NFL). Williams played college football for the Clemson Tigers and was selected by the Commanders in the third round of the 2026 NFL draft.

== Early life ==
Williams was born on July 14, 2004, and grew up in Greenville, South Carolina. He attended Dutch Fork High School in Irmo, South Carolina. During his career, he had 137 receptions for 2,458 yards and 23 touchdowns. Williams was selected to play in the 2022 Under Armour All-America Game. He committed to Clemson University to play college football.

== College career ==
Williams earned immediate playing time his true freshman year at Clemson in 2022. In his first career game he had four receptions for 37 yards.

College statistics
Season	Team	GP	Receiving				Rushing				Kick returns			
Season	Team	GP	Rec	Yds	Avg	TD	Att	Yds	Avg	TD	Ret	Yds	Avg	TD
2022	Clemson	14	56	604	10.8	4	1	9	9.0	0	15	129	8.6	0
2023	Clemson	5	22	224	10.2	2	0	0	0.0	0	3	14	4.7	0
2024	Clemson	14	75	904	12.1	11	7	101	14.4	1	17	164	9.6	0
2025	Clemson	10	55	604	11.0	4	13	78	6.0	1	4	44	11.0	0
Career		42	208	2,336	11.2	21	25	187	7.5	2	39	351	9.0	0

== Professional career ==
Pre-draft measurables
Height	Weight	Arm length	Hand span	Wingspan	40-yard dash	10-yard split	20-yard split	20-yard shuttle	Three-cone drill	Vertical jump	Broad jump	Bench press
5 ft 11 1/2 in (1.82 m)	187 lb (85 kg)	30 3/4 in (0.78 m)	9 1/4 in (0.23 m)	6 ft 4 in (1.93 m)	4.41 s	1.55 s	2.58 s	4.10 s	6.76 s	39.5 in (1.00 m)	10 ft 4 in (3.15 m)	10 reps
All values from NFL Combine/Pro Day

Williams was selected by the Washington Commanders in the third round with the 71st overall pick of the 2026 NFL draft, signing his four-year rookie contract on May 8, 2026. In his NFL debut during Washington's season–opening loss to the Philadelphia Eagles, Williams recorded his first career touchdown on a one–yard reception from Jayden Daniels.
