= Ashton Hampton =

American football player (born 2006)

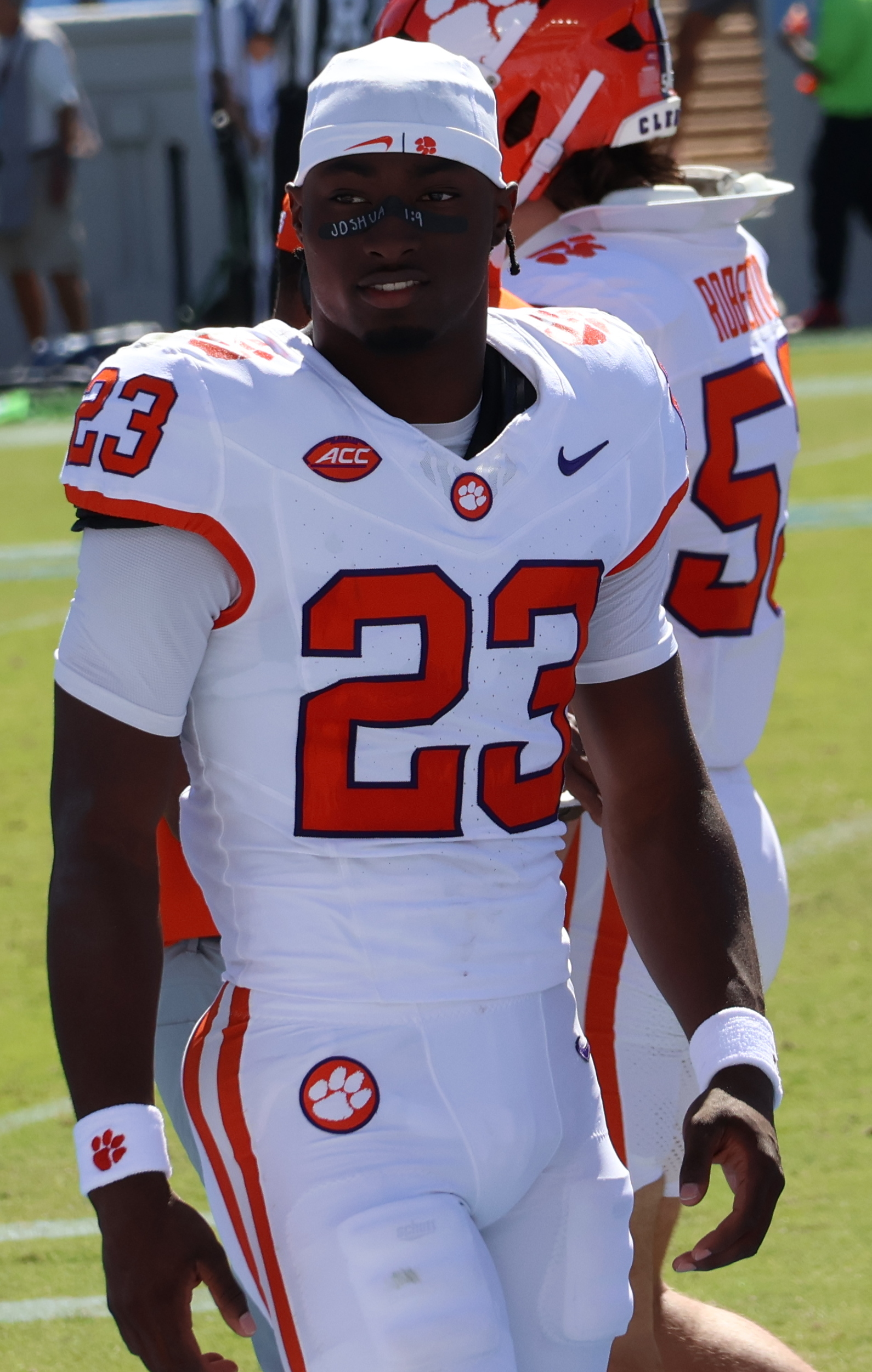

No. 2 – Clemson Tigers
- Position: Cornerback
- Class: Junior

Personal information
- Born: January 9, 2006 (age 20)
- Listed height: 6 ft 2 in (1.88 m)
- Listed weight: 200 lb (91 kg)

Career information
- High school: Florida State University (Tallahassee, Florida)
- College: Clemson (2024–present)
- Stats at ESPN

Ashton Hampton (born January 9, 2006) is an American college football cornerback for the Clemson Tigers.

== Early life ==
Hampton attended Florida State University High School in Tallahassee, Florida, where he played cornerback and wide receiver. He was the All-Big Bend Defensive Player of the Year his senior year after recording 64 tackles and three interceptions. During his career he had 92 tackles and six interceptions on defense and 115 receptions for 1,797 yards and 21 touchdowns as a receiver. Hampton committed to Clemson University to play college football.

== College career ==
Hampton earned immediate playing time his freshman year at Clemson in 2024. He started four of 14 games and had 30 tackles and two interception, one that was returned for a touchdown. He started all 13 games his sophomore year in 2025, recording 45 tackles and one interception.

== Personal life ==
His father, Alonzo Hampton, is the head coach of the Arkansas–Pine Bluff Golden Lions.
