= Payton Page =

American football player (born 2002)

No. 98 – New York Jets
- Position: Defensive tackle
- Roster status: Active

Personal information
- Born: September 27, 2002 (age 24); Greensboro, North Carolina, U.S.
- Listed height: 6 ft 4 in (1.93 m)
- Listed weight: 300 lb (136 kg)

Career information
- High school: James B. Dudley (Greensboro)
- College: Clemson (2021–2024)
- NFL draft: 2025: undrafted

Career history
- New York Jets (2025–present)

Awards and highlights
- Third-team All-ACC (2024)

Career NFL statistics as of 2025
- Total tackles: 6
- Stats at Pro Football Reference

Payton Page (born September 27, 2002) is an American professional football defensive tackle for the New York Jets of the National Football League (NFL). He played college football for the Clemson Tigers.

== Early life ==
Page attended high school at James B. Dudley located in Greensboro, North Carolina. Coming out of high school, he was rated as a four-star recruit, and the 31st overall prospect in the class of 2021, where he committed to play college football for the Clemson Tigers over offers from North Carolina and Tennessee.

== College career ==
During his four-year career at Clemson, he appeared in 53 games, becoming a full time starter in 2024, where he recorded 69 tackles with six and a half being for a loss, half a sack, two pass deflections, and a 57-yard pick six versus The Citadel, where for his performance he was named third-team all-ACC in 2024.

== Professional career ==
Pre-draft measurables
Height	Weight	Arm length	Hand span	Wingspan	40-yard dash	10-yard split	20-yard split	Vertical jump	Broad jump	Bench press
6 ft 3 1/4 in (1.91 m)	290 lb (132 kg)	31 3/8 in (0.80 m)	10 in (0.25 m)	6 ft 7 1/8 in (2.01 m)	5.13 s	1.75 s	2.97 s	33.0 in (0.84 m)	9 ft 8 in (2.95 m)	27 reps
All values from NFL Combine/Pro Day

After not being selected in the 2025 NFL draft, Page signed with the New York Jets as an undrafted free agent. He was waived on August 26 as part of final roster cuts and re-signed to the practice squad the next day. Page was promoted to the active roster on December 18.

On August 30, 2026, Page was waived by the Jets as a part of final roster cuts; he was re-signed to the team's practice squad the following day. He was promoted to the active roster on October 31.

== NFL career statistics ==
=== Regular season ===
Year	Team	Games		Tackles					Interceptions						Fumbles				
Year	Team	GP	GS	Cmb	Solo	Ast	Sck	TFL	Int	Yds	Avg	Lng	TD	PD	FF	Fum	FR	Yds	TD
2025	NYJ	4	0	6	5	1	0.0	1	0	0	0.0	0	0	0	0	0	0	0	0
Career		4	0	6	5	1	0.0	1	0	0	0.0	0	0	0	0	0	0	0	0
