= 2024 ACC Championship Game =

Postseason college football bowl game

- Conference Championship
Clemson Tigers	SMU Mustangs
(9–3)	(11–1)
34	31
Head coach: Dabo Swinney	Head coach: Rhett Lashlee
AP / Coaches / CFP; 18 / 17 / 17	AP / Coaches / CFP; 8 / 7 / 8
	1	2	3	4	Total
Clemson	21	3	7	3	34
SMU	7	0	7	17	31
- Date: December 7, 2024
- Season: 2024
- Stadium: Bank of America Stadium
- Location: Charlotte, North Carolina
- MVP: Cade Klubnik, QB, Clemson
- Favorite: SMU by 2.5
- Referee: Adam Savoie
- Attendance: 53,808

United States TV coverage
- Network: ABC; ESPN Radio
- Announcers: ABC: Sean McDonough (play-by-play), Greg McElroy (analyst), and Molly McGrath (sideline reporter); ESPN Radio: Marc Kestecher (play-by-play), Kelly Stouffer (analyst), and Ian Fitzsimmons (sideline reporter)

2024 Atlantic Coast Conference football standings
	Conf.			Overall
Team	W		L	W		L
No. 12 SMU y^	8	–	0	11	–	3
No. 14 Clemson y$^	7	–	1	10	–	4
No. 18 Miami (FL)	6	–	2	10	–	3
No. 20 Syracuse	5	–	3	10	–	3
Duke	5	–	3	9	–	4
Louisville	5	–	3	9	–	4
Georgia Tech	5	–	3	7	–	6
Boston College	4	–	4	7	–	6
Virginia Tech	4	–	4	6	–	7
Pittsburgh	3	–	5	7	–	6
NC State	3	–	5	6	–	7
North Carolina	3	–	5	6	–	7
Virginia	3	–	5	5	–	7
California	2	–	6	6	–	7
Wake Forest	2	–	6	4	–	8
Stanford	2	–	6	3	–	9
Florida State	1	–	7	2	–	10
Championship: Clemson 34, SMU 31
^ – College Football Playoff participant; $ – Conference champion; y – Championship game participant; Rankings from AP Poll

The 2024 ACC Championship Game was a college football conference championship game played on December 7, 2024, at Bank of America Stadium in Charlotte, North Carolina to determine the champion of the Atlantic Coast Conference (ACC) for the 2024 season. The game featured the SMU Mustangs and the Clemson Tigers. The 20th annual ACC Championship Game began at 8:00 p.m. EST on ABC.

== Teams ==
The 2024 ACC Championship Game featured the SMU Mustangs, with an 8–0 conference record, representing the #1 seed, and the Clemson Tigers, with a 7–1 conference record, representing the #2 seed.

This was the first ACC title game appearance for SMU in its first season in the ACC. The matchup also was the first ever meeting between the two schools.

=== Clemson Tigers ===
The Tigers clinched a spot in the game following Miami's loss to Syracuse on November 30. They finished the regular season 9–3 (7–1 ACC), and the designated away team for this game.

=== SMU Mustangs ===
The Mustangs clinched a spot in the game following their defeat of Virginia on November 23. They finished the regular season 11–1 (8–0 ACC), with a loss to BYU. They are the designated home team for the championship game. The 2024 season was SMU's first in the ACC, having previously played in the American Athletic Conference. The Mustangs are the first team transitioning to a power conference to reach a conference championship game in the National Championship Game era (since 1998).

== Scoring summary ==
2024 ACC Championship Game
No. 17 Clemson Tigers (9–3, 7–1) vs. No. 8 SMU Mustangs (11–1, 8–0)

Quarter	1	2	3	4	Total
No. 17 Clemson	21	3	7	3	34
No. 8 SMU	7	0	7	17	31

at Bank of America Stadium • Charlotte, NC

- Date: Saturday, December 7, 2024
- Game time: 8:00 p.m. EST
- Game weather: Temperature: 44 °F (7 °C) • Wind: SE 10 mph • Weather: Clear
- Game attendance: 53,808
- Referee: Adam Savoie
- TV announcers (ABC/ESPN Radio): (ABC): Sean McDonough (play-by-play), Greg McElroy (color analyst), and Molly McGrath (sideline reporter)
  (ESPN Radio): Marc Kestecher (play-by-play), Kelly Stouffer (color analyst), and Ian Fitzsimmons (sideline reporter)

Game information
First quarter
- CLEM – Bryant Wesco 35-yard pass from Cade Klubnik (Nolan Hauser kick), 13:35. Tigers 7–0. Drive: 2 plays, 33 yards, 0:39.
- CLEM – Jake Brinningstool 5-yard pass from Cade Klubnik (Nolan Hauser kick), 10:47. Tigers 14–0. Drive: 4 plays, 28 yards, 1:54.
- SMU – Kevin Jennings 24-yard run (Collin Rogers kick), 7:05. Tigers 14–7. Drive: 10 plays, 75 yards, 3:42.
- CLEM – Bryant Wesco 43-yard pass from Cade Klubnik (Nolan Hauser kick), 3:28. Tigers 21–7. Drive: 8 plays, 75 yards, 3:37.

Second quarter

- CLEM – Nolan Hauser 44-yard field goal, 5:22. Tigers 24–7. Drive: 7 plays, 19 yards, 2:15.

Third quarter

- SMU – Brashard Smith 10-yard pass from Kevin Jennings (Collin Rogers kick), 11:04. Tigers 24–14. Drive: 7 plays, 74 yards, 2:30.
- CLEM – Jake Brinningstool 5-yard pass from Cade Klubnik (Nolan Hauser kick), 0:23. Tigers 31–14. Drive: 10 plays, 58 yards, 4:55.

Fourth quarter

- SMU – Matthew Hibner 20-yard pass from Kevin Jennings (Collin Rogers kick), 13:22. Tigers 31–21. Drive: 7 plays, 61 yards, 2:01.
- SMU – Collin Rogers 46-yard field goal, 6:56. Tigers 31–24. Drive: 8 plays, 21 yards, 3:17.
- SMU – Roderick Daniels Jr. 4-yard pass from Kevin Jennings (Collin Rogers kick), 0:16. Tied 31–31. Drive: 16 plays, 79 yards, 3:49.
- CLEM – Nolan Hauser 56-yard field goal, 0:00. Tigers 34–31. Drive: 2 plays, 17 yards, 0:16.

Statistics	CLEM	SMU
First downs	20	28
Plays–yards	73–326	86–458
Rushes–yards	32–64	35–145
Passing yards	262	304
Passing: comp–att–int	24–41–0	31–51–1
Time of possession	32:09	27:51

Team	Category	Player	Statistics
Clemson	Passing	Cade Klubnik	24/41, 262 yards, 4 TD
Clemson	Rushing	Phil Mafah	13 carries, 28 yards
Clemson	Receiving	Bryant Wesco Jr.	8 receptions, 143 yards, 2 TD
SMU	Passing	Kevin Jennings	31/50, 304 yards, 3 TD, 1 INT
SMU	Rushing	Brashard Smith	24 carries, 113 yards
SMU	Receiving	Roderick Daniels Jr.	8 receptions, 97 yards, 1 TD
