= 2023 Gator Bowl =

Postseason college football bowl game

2023 TaxSlayer Gator Bowl
- 79th Gator Bowl
Clemson Tigers	Kentucky Wildcats
(8–4)	(7–5)
ACC	SEC
38	35
Head coach: Dabo Swinney	Head coach: Mark Stoops
AP / Coaches / CFP; NR / NR / 22
	1	2	3	4	Total
Clemson	3	7	0	28	38
Kentucky	7	7	7	14	35
- Date: December 29, 2023
- Season: 2023
- Stadium: EverBank Stadium
- Location: Jacksonville, Florida
- MVP: Phil Mafah (RB, Clemson); Barion Brown (WR, Kentucky)
- Favorite: Clemson by 6.5
- Referee: John Love (Pac-12)
- Attendance: 40,132

United States TV coverage
- Network: ESPN
- Announcers: Wes Durham, Tim Hasselbeck, Taylor Tannebaum

The 2023 Gator Bowl was a college football bowl game played on December 29, 2023, at EverBank Stadium in Jacksonville, Florida. The 79th annual Gator Bowl featured Clemson from the Atlantic Coast Conference (ACC) and Kentucky from the Southeastern Conference (SEC). The game began at approximately 12:00 p.m. EST and was aired on ESPN. The Gator Bowl was one of the 2023–24 bowl games concluding the 2023 FBS football season. The game was sponsored by financial technology company TaxSlayer and was officially known as the TaxSlayer Gator Bowl.

== Teams ==
Consistent with conference tie-ins, the bowl featured the Clemson Tigers of the Atlantic Coast Conference (ACC) and the Kentucky Wildcats of the Southeastern Conference (SEC).

This was the 14th meeting between Clemson and Kentucky; entering the game, the Wildcats led the Tigers in the all-time series, 8–5. This was also the fourth time the teams met in a bowl game; Clemson won two of their three prior bowl meetings, including their most recent postseason meeting, the 2009 Music City Bowl.

On two occasions, Clemson and Kentucky competed in the same conference, playing together as members of the Southern Intercollegiate Athletic Association (1896–1904 and 1912–1920) and the Southern Conference (1922–1932).

=== Clemson Tigers ===
The Tigers entered the game with an 8–4 record (4–4 in the ACC), tied for sixth place in their conference and ranked 22nd in the College Football Playoff rankings.

This was Clemson's 10th Gator Bowl, setting a new mark for most appearances in the game. The Tigers were 4–5 in prior Gator Bowl appearances; they had most recently appeared in (and lost) the January 2009 edition.

=== Kentucky Wildcats ===
The Wildcats entered the game with a 7–5 record (3–5 in the SEC), tied for fourth place in their conference's East Division.

This was Kentucky's third Gator Bowl; the Wildcats previously lost the December 2016 edition and won the January 2021 edition.

== Game summary ==
2023 TaxSlayer Gator Bowl

Quarter	1	2	3	4	Total
No. 22 Clemson	3	7	0	28	38
Kentucky	7	7	7	14	35

at EverBank Stadium • Jacksonville, Florida

- Date: Friday, December 29, 2023
- Game time: 12:00 p.m. EST
- Game weather: Sunny • Temperature: 51 °F (11 °C) • Wind: 10 mph (16 km/h) W
- Game attendance: 40,132
- Referee: John Love
- TV announcers (ESPN): Wes Durham (play-by-play), Tim Hasselbeck (color), Taylor Tannebaum (sideline)
- Box score

Game information
First quarter
- (11:16) Clemson – Johnathan Weitz 39 yard field goal, (Drive: 7 plays, 39 yards, 3:37; Clemson 3–0)
- (5:00) Kentucky – Barion Brown 22 yard rush, Alex Raynor kick, (Drive: 4 plays, 73 yards, 2:14; Kentucky 7–3)

Second quarter

- (10:17) Clemson – Phil Mafah 1 yard rush, Weitz kick, (Drive: 5 plays, 59 yards, 3:02; Clemson 10–7)
- (7:44) Kentucky – Dane Key 5 yard pass from Devin Leary, Raynor kick, (Drive: 4 plays, 75 yards, 2:33; Kentucky 14–10)

Third quarter

- (14:47) Kentucky – Brown 100 yard kick off return, Raynor kick, (Drive: 0 plays, 100 yards, 0:13; Kentucky 21–10)

Fourth quarter

- (14:56) Clemson – Mafah 1 yard rush, Troy Stellato pass from Cade Klubnik failed, (Drive: 14 plays, 70 yards, 6:35; Kentucky 21–16)
- (7:00) Clemson – Weitz 28 yard field goal, (Drive: 7 plays, 26 yards, 3:08; Kentucky 21–19)
- (6:45) Clemson – Mafah 1 yard rush, Tyler Brown pass from Klubnik, (Drive: 1 plays, 29 yards, 0:07; Clemson 27–21)
- (6:12) Kentucky – Brown 60 yard pass from Leary, Raynor kick, (Drive: 3 plays, 75 yards, 0:33; Kentucky 28–27)
- (4:20) Clemson – Weitz 52 yard field goal, (Drive: 4 plays, 2 yards, 1:42; Clemson 30–28)
- (2:39) Kentucky – Ray Davis 1 yard rush, Raynor kick, (Drive: 3 plays, 75 yards, 1:41; Kentucky 35–30)
- (0:17) Clemson – Mafah 3 yard rush, Josh Sapp pass from Klubnik, (Drive: 12 plays, 68 yards, 2:17; Clemson 38–35)

=== Statistics ===
Statistics	CLE	KEN
First downs	24	12
Plays–yards	80–367	51–398
Rushes–yards	39–103	23–92
Passing yards	264	306
Passing: comp–att–int	30–41–1	16–28–2
Time of possession	34:58	25:02

Team	Category	Player	Statistics
Clemson	Passing	Cade Klubnik	30/41, 264 yards, 1 INT
Clemson	Rushing	Phil Mafah	11 carries, 71 yards, 4 TDs
Clemson	Receiving	Jake Briningstool	9 receptions, 91 yards
Kentucky	Passing	Devin Leary	16/28, 306 yds, 2TDs, 2 INTs
Kentucky	Rushing	Ray Davis	13 carries, 63 yards, 1 TD
Kentucky	Receiving	Barion Brown	3 receptions, 100 yards, 1 TD
