= 2023 Kentucky Wildcats football team =

American college football season

2023 Kentucky Wildcats football

Gator Bowl, L 35–38 vs. Clemson
- Conference: Southeastern Conference
- Eastern Division
- Record: 7–6 (3–5 SEC)
- Head coach: Mark Stoops (11th season)
- Offensive coordinator: Liam Coen (2nd overall season)
- Offensive scheme: Multiple pro-style
- Defensive coordinator: Brad White (5th season)
- Base defense: 3–4 or 4–3
- Home stadium: Kroger Field

2023 Southeastern Conference football standings
	Conf.			Overall
Team	W		L	W		L
Eastern Division
No. 4 Georgia xy	8	–	0	13	–	1
No. 8 Missouri	6	–	2	11	–	2
No. 17 Tennessee	4	–	4	9	–	4
Kentucky	3	–	5	7	–	6
Florida	3	–	5	5	–	7
South Carolina	3	–	5	5	–	7
Vanderbilt	0	–	8	2	–	10
Western Division
No. 5 Alabama xy$^	8	–	0	12	–	2
No. 9 Ole Miss	6	–	2	11	–	2
No. 12 LSU	6	–	2	10	–	3
Texas A&M	4	–	4	7	–	6
Auburn	3	–	5	6	–	7
Mississippi State	1	–	7	5	–	7
Arkansas	1	–	7	4	–	8
Championship: Alabama 27, Georgia 24
^ – College Football Playoff participant; $ – Conference champion; x – Division champion/co-champions; y – Championship game participant; Rankings from AP Poll

The 2023 Kentucky Wildcats football team represented the University of Kentucky in the Eastern Division of the Southeastern Conference (SEC) during the 2023 NCAA Division I FBS football season. The Wildcats were led by Mark Stoops in his 11th year as their head coach. The Kentucky football team played their home games at Kroger Field in Lexington, Kentucky.

This was the final year for the SEC's East–West divisional setup, as Texas and Oklahoma joined the conference in 2024.

== Schedule ==
Date	Time	Opponent	Rank	Site	TV	Result	Attendance
September 2	12:00 p.m.	Ball State*		Kroger Field; Lexington, KY	SECN	W 44–14	58,286
September 9	3:00 p.m.	Eastern Kentucky*		Kroger Field; Lexington, KY	SECN+, ESPN+	W 28–17	61,876
September 16	7:30 p.m.	Akron*		Kroger Field; Lexington, KY	ESPNU	W 35–3	59,456
September 23	12:00 p.m.	at Vanderbilt		FirstBank Stadium; Nashville, TN (rivalry)	SECN	W 45–28	26,279
September 30	12:00 p.m.	No. 22 Florida		Kroger Field; Lexington, KY (rivalry, SEC Nation)	ESPN	W 33–14	61,699
October 7	7:00 p.m.	at No. 1 Georgia	No. 20	Sanford Stadium; Athens, GA (SEC Nation)	ESPN	L 13–51	92,746
October 14	7:30 p.m.	Missouri	No. 24	Kroger Field; Lexington, KY	SECN	L 21–38	61,654
October 28	7:00 p.m.	No. 21 Tennessee		Kroger Field; Lexington, KY (rivalry)	ESPN	L 27–33	61,665
November 4	7:30 p.m.	at Mississippi State		Davis Wade Stadium; Mississippi State, MS	SECN	W 24–3	52,329
November 11	12:00 p.m.	No. 8 Alabama		Kroger Field; Lexington, KY (SEC Nation)	ESPN	L 21–49	61,936
November 18	7:30 p.m.	at South Carolina		Williams–Brice Stadium; Columbia, SC	SECN	L 14–17	77,788
November 25	12:00 p.m.	at No. 10 Louisville*		L&N Federal Credit Union Stadium; Louisville, KY (Governor's Cup)	ABC	W 38–31	59,225
December 29	12:00 p.m.	vs. No. 22 Clemson*		Everbank Field; Jacksonville, FL (Gator Bowl)	ESPN	L 35–38	40,132
*Non-conference game; Rankings from AP Poll (and CFP Rankings, after TBA) - Released prior to game; All times are in Eastern time

== Coaching staff ==
Name	Position	Years at Kentucky
Mark Stoops	Head coach	11th
Vince Marrow	Associate head coach/tight ends coach	11th
Liam Coen	Offensive coordinator/quarterbacks coach	2nd
Brad White	Defensive coordinator/outside linebackers coach	5th
Jay Boulware	Running backs coach	1st
Mike Stoops	Inside linebackers coach	2nd
Frank Buffano	Safeties coach	4th
Chris Collins	Defensive backs coach	3rd
Zach Yenser	Offensive line coach	2nd
Scott Woodward	Wide receivers coach	3rd
Anwar Stewart	Defensive line coach	4th
Mark Hill	Strength and conditioning	8th

== Game summaries ==
=== Ball State ===
Game One – Ball State Cardinals (0–0) at Kentucky Wildcats (0–0) – Game summary

Quarter	1	2	3	4	Total
Ball State	7	0	7	0	14
Kentucky	3	20	14	7	44

at Kroger Field • Lexington, KY

- Date: Saturday, September 2, 2023
- Game time: 12:00 p.m. EST
- Game weather: -
- Game attendance: 58,286
- TV: SEC Network

Game information

First quarter

- (13:17) UK – Alex Raynor 41-yard field goal (Drive: 5 plays, 51 yards, 1:43; Kentucky 3–0)
- (1:35) BALL – Layne Hatcher 2-yard run (Jackson Courville kick) (Drive: 13 plays, 73 yards, 7:05; Ball State 7–3)

Second quarter

- (11:31) UK – Ray Davis 2-yard run (Alex Raynor kick) (Drive: 11 plays, 70 yards, 4:58; Kentucky 10–7)
- (6:58) UK – Jalen Geiger 0-yard fumble return (Alex Raynor kick) (Kentucky 17–7)
- (1:08) UK – Alex Raynor 46-yard field goal (Drive: 4 plays, 2 yards, 0:10; Kentucky 20–7)
- (0:00) UK – Alex Raynor 46-yard field goal (Drive: 4 plays, 26 yards, 0:31; Kentucky 23–7)

Third quarter

- (6:43) UK – Dane Key 5-yard pass from Devin Leary (Alex Raynor kick) (Drive: 7 plays, 89 yards, 2:37; Kentucky 30–7)
- (0:42) BALL – Ty Robinson 5-yard pass from Kadin Semonza (Jackson Courville kick) (Drive: 10 plays, 75 yards, 6:01; Kentucky 30–14)
- (0:28) UK – Barion Brown 99-yard kickoff return (Alex Raynor kick) (Kentucky 37–14)

Fourth quarter

- (0:06) UK – Ray Davis 30 yard run (Alex Raynor kick) (Drive: 6 plays, 66 yards, 3:16; Kentucky 44–14)

Statistics	BALL	UK
First downs	18	17
Total yards	71–295	51–354
Rushing yards	41–72	20–113
Passing yards	223	241
Passing: Comp–Att–Int	22–30–0	18–31–1
Time of possession	38:16	21:44

Team	Category	Player	Statistics
Ball State	Passing	Kadin Semonza	15/21, 165 yards, TD
Ball State	Rushing	Marquez Cooper	15 carries, 33 yards
Ball State	Receiving	Ty Robinson	5 receptions, 90 yards, TD
Kentucky	Passing	Devin Leary	18/31, 241 yards, TD, INT
Kentucky	Rushing	Ray Davis	14 carries, 112 yards, 2 TD
Kentucky	Receiving	Dane Key	5 receptions, 96 yards, TD

=== Eastern Kentucky ===
Game Two – Eastern Kentucky Colonels (0–1) at Kentucky Wildcats (1–0) – Game summary

Quarter	1	2	3	4	Total
Eastern Kentucky	7	0	3	7	17
Kentucky	0	7	14	7	28

at Kroger Field • Lexington, KY

- Date: Saturday, September 9, 2023
- Game time: 3:00 p.m. EST
- Game weather: Cloudy • Temperature: 72 °F (22 °C) • Wind: NE 12 miles per hour (19 km/h)
- Game attendance: 61,876
- Referee: Ken Williamson
- TV announcers (SECN+): Peter Sousa (play-by-play), Takeo Spikes (analyst)

Game information

First quarter

- (10:46) EKU – Parker McKinney 14-yard run (Patrick Nations kick) (Drive: 6 plays, 30 yards, 2:32; Eastern Kentucky 7-0)

Second quarter

- (0:42) UK – Tayvion Robinson 24-yard pass from Devin Leary (Alex Raynor kick) (Drive: 1 play, 24 yards, 0:06; Tied 7-7)

Third quarter

- (9:41) EKU – Patrick Nations 21-yard field goal (Drive: 10 plays, 71 yards, 5:19; Eastern Kentucky 10-7)
- (5:47) UK – Tayvion Robinson 6-yard pass from Devin Leary (Alex Raynor kick) (Drive: 9 plays, 72 yards, 3:54; Kentucky 14-10)
- (1:47) UK – Barion Brown 13-yard pass from Devin Leary (Alex Raynor kick) (Drive: 4 plays, 85 yards, 2:00; Kentucky 21-10)

Fourth quarter

- (12:04) EKU – Braedon Sloan 9-yard pass from Parker McKinney (Patrick Nations kick) (Drive: 9 plays, 75 yards, 4:43; Kentucky 21-17)
- (8:08) UK – Ray Davis 24-yard pass from Devin Leary (Alex Raynor kick) (Drive: 6 plays, 65 yards, 3:49; Kentucky 28-17)

Statistics	EKU	UK
First downs	15	20
Total yards	56–311	61–414
Rushing yards	27–92	23–115
Passing yards	219	299
Passing: Comp–Att–Int	19–29–1	24–38–1
Time of possession	27:53	32:07

Team	Category	Player	Statistics
Eastern Kentucky	Passing	Parker McKinney	19/29, 219 yards, TD, INT
Eastern Kentucky	Rushing	Braedon Sloan	7 carries, 48 yards
Eastern Kentucky	Receiving	Bryant Johnson	2 receptions, 53 yards
Kentucky	Passing	Devin Leary	24/38, 299 yards, 4 TD, INT
Kentucky	Rushing	Ray Davis	12 carries, 52 yards
Kentucky	Receiving	Tayvion Robinson	6 receptions, 136 yards, 2 TD

=== Akron ===
Game Three – Akron Zips (1–1) at Kentucky Wildcats (2–0) – Game summary

Quarter	1	2	3	4	Total
Akron	0	0	3	0	3
Kentucky	7	7	7	14	35

at Kroger Field • Lexington, KY

- Date: Saturday, September 16, 2023
- Game time: 7:30 p.m. EST
- Game weather: -
- Game attendance: 59,456
- Referee: Lee Hedrick
- TV announcers (ESPNU): Courtney Lyle (play-by-play), Hutson Mason (analyst)

Game information

First quarter

- (10:34) UK – Josh Kattus 6-yard pass from Devin Leary (Alex Raynor kick) (Drive: 7 plays, 75 yards, 4:26; Kentucky 7-0)

Second quarter

- (0:08) UK – Tayvion Robinson 22-yard pass from Devin Leary (Alex Raynor kick) (Drive: 10 plays, 70 yards, 5:31; Kentucky 14-0)

Third quarter

- (3:27) AKR – Noah Perez 36-yard field goal (Drive: 9 plays, 27 yards, 5:33; Kentucky 14-3)
- (1:38) UK – Ray Davis 58-yard pass from Devin Leary (Alex Raynor kick) (Drive: 4 plays, 81 yards, 1:14; Kentucky 21-3)

Fourth quarter

- (13:47) UK – Ray Davis 55-yard run (Alex Raynor kick) (Drive: 3 plays, 73 yards, 1:08; Kentucky 28-3)
- (3:04) UK – Demie Sumo-Karngbaye 4-yard run (Alex Raynor kick) (Drive: 4 plays, 62 yards, 2:03; Kentucky 35-3)

Statistics	AKR	UK
First downs	16	18
Total yards	66–239	48–450
Rushing yards	25–49	22–135
Passing yards	190	315
Passing: Comp–Att–Int	29–41–0	16–26–1
Time of possession	34:47	25:13

Team	Category	Player	Statistics
Akron	Passing	DJ Irons	23/34, 130 yards
Akron	Rushing	Lorenzo Lingard	7 carries, 30 yards
Akron	Receiving	Jasaiah Gathings	5 receptions, 43 yards
Kentucky	Passing	Devin Leary	16/25, 315 yards, 3 TD, INT
Kentucky	Rushing	Ray Davis	7 carries, 72 yards, TD
Kentucky	Receiving	Ray Davis	3 receptions, 97 yards, TD

=== at Vanderbilt (rivalry) ===
Game Four – Kentucky Wildcats (3–0) at Vanderbilt Commodores (2–2) – Game summary

Quarter	1	2	3	4	Total
Kentucky	21	3	7	14	45
Vanderbilt	0	10	3	15	28

at FirstBank Stadium • Nashville, Tennessee

- Date: Saturday, September 23, 2023
- Game time: 12:00 p.m. EST
- Game weather: Sunny • Temperature: 75 °F (24 °C) • Wind: NE 4 miles per hour (6.4 km/h)
- Game attendance: 26,279
- Referee: Daniel Gautreaux
- TV announcers (ESPN): Taylor Zarzour (play-by-play), Matt Stinchcomb (color) and Alyssa Lang (sideline)

Game information

First quarter

- (9:51) UK – JuTahn McClain 36-yard run (Alex Raynor kick) (Drive: 7 plays, 82 yards, 3:42; Kentucky 7-0)
- (8:14) UK – Maxwell Hairston 29-yard interception return (Alex Raynor kick) (Kentucky 14-0)
- (1:56) UK – Ray Davis 2-yard run (Alex Raynor kick) (Drive: 5 plays, 69 yards, 2:04; Kentucky 21-0)

Second quarter

- (4:53) UK – Alex Raynor 27-yard field goal (Drive: 13 plays, 74 yards, 6:25; Kentucky 24-0)
- (2:51) VAN – Jacob Borcila 41-yard field goal (Drive: 6 plays, 52 yards, 2:02; Kentucky 24-3)
- (0:20) VAN – Sedrick Alexander 7-yard run (Jacob Borcila kick) (Drive: 6 plays, 57 yards, 1:38; Kentucky 24-10)

Third quarter

- (11:25) VAN – Jacob Borcila 32-yard field goal (Drive: 4 plays, 3 yards, 0:51; Kentucky 24-13)
- (6:44) UK – Ray Davis 1-yard run (Alex Raynor kick) (Drive: 4 plays, 11 yards, 2:03; Kentucky 31-13)

Fourth quarter

- (10:35) UK – Dane Key 22-yard pass from Devin Leary (Alex Raynor kick) (Drive: 9 plays, 73 yards, 6:40; Kentucky 38-13)
- (8:00) VAN – Patrick Smith 2-yard run (AJ Swann pass to Quincy Skinner Jr) (Drive: 7 plays, 66 yards, 2:28; Kentucky 38-21)
- (4:15) UK – Maxwell Hairston 54-yard interception return (Alex Raynor kick) (Kentucky 45-21)
- (0:23) VAN – Kamrean Johnson 10-yard pass from Ken Seals (Jacob Borcila kick) (Drive: 14 plays, 75 yards, 3:52; Kentucky 45-28)

Statistics	UK	VAN
First downs	18	20
Total yards	60–365	74–328
Rushing yards	31–160	27–97
Passing yards	205	231
Passing: Comp–Att–Int	15–29–2	20–47–4
Time of possession	31:11	28:49

Team	Category	Player	Statistics
Kentucky	Passing	Devin Leary	15/29, 205 yards, TD, 2 INT
Kentucky	Rushing	Ray Davis	17 carries, 78 yards, 2 TD
Kentucky	Receiving	Barion Brown	4 receptions, 105 yards
Vanderbilt	Passing	AJ Swann	16/40, 189 yards, 3 INT
Vanderbilt	Rushing	Sedrick Alexander	8 carries, 37 yards, TD
Vanderbilt	Receiving	Gamarion Carter	2 receptions, 48 yards

=== No. 22 Florida (rivalry) ===
Game Five – No. 22 Florida Gators (3–1) at Kentucky Wildcats (4–0) – Game summary

Quarter	1	2	3	4	Total
No. 22 Florida	0	7	7	0	14
Kentucky	16	7	7	3	33

at Kroger Field • Lexington, Kentucky

- Date: Saturday, September 30, 2023
- Game time: 12:07 p.m. EDT
- Game weather: Temperature: 78 °F (26 °C) • Wind: E at 6 miles per hour (9.7 km/h) • Weather: sunny
- Game attendance: 61,699
- Referee: Matt Loeffler
- TV announcers (ESPN): Joe Tessitore (play-by-play), Jesse Palmer (analyst), and Katie George (sideline reporter)

Game information

First quarter

- (7:13) UK – Alex Raynor 24-yard field goal (Drive: 12 plays, 81 yards, 5:02; Kentucky 3-0)
- (5:37) UK – Ray Davis 9-yard pass from Devin Leary (Alex Raynor kick) (Drive: 2 plays, 15 yards, 0:40; Kentucky 10-0)
- (0:23) UK – Ray Davis 75-yard run (Alex Raynor PAT blocked) (Drive: 4 plays, 90 yards, 0:35; Kentucky 16-0)

Second quarter

- (8:54) UK – Ray Davis 3-yard run (Alex Raynor kick) (Drive: 7 plays, 80 yards, 3:56; Kentucky 23-0)
- (0:34) FLA – Hayden Hansen 4-yard pass from Graham Mertz (Trey Smack kick) (Drive: 6 plays, 75 yards, 2:15; Kentucky 23-7)

Third quarter

- (10:54) UK – Ray Davis 2-yard run (Alex Raynor kick) (Drive: 8 plays, 68 yards, 3:56; Kentucky 30-7)
- (7:17) FLA – Ricky Pearsall 33-yard pass from Graham Mertz (Trey Smack kick) (Drive: 7 plays, 75 yards, 3:17; Kentucky 30-14)

Fourth quarter

- (7:44) UK – Alex Raynor 50-yard field goal (Drive: 6 plays, 15 yards, 3:40; Kentucky 33-14)

Statistics	FLA	UK
First downs	15	23
Total yards	59–313	56–398
Rushing yards	29–69	36–329
Passing yards	244	69
Passing: Comp–Att–Int	25–30–1	9–20–0
Time of possession	31:14	28:46

Team	Category	Player	Statistics
Florida	Passing	Graham Mertz	25/30, 244 yards, 2 TD, INT
Florida	Rushing	Montrell Johnson Jr.	10 carries, 42 yards
Florida	Receiving	Ricky Pearsall	3 receptions, 62 yards, TD
Kentucky	Passing	Devin Leary	9/20, 69 yards, TD
Kentucky	Rushing	Ray Davis	26 carries, 280 yards, 3 TD
Kentucky	Receiving	Barion Brown	4 receptions, 37 yards

=== at No. 1 Georgia ===
Game Six – No. 20 Kentucky Wildcats (5–0) at No. 1 Georgia Bulldogs (5–0) – Game summary

Quarter	1	2	3	4	Total
No. 20 Kentucky	0	7	6	0	13
No. 1 Georgia	14	20	10	7	51

at Sanford Stadium • Athens, Georgia

- Date: Saturday, October 7, 2023
- Game time: 7:00 p.m. EST
- Game weather: -
- Game attendance: 92,746
- Referee: Kyle Olson
- TV announcers (ESPN): Sean McDonough (play-by-play), Greg McElroy (color) and Molly McGrath (sideline)

Game information

First quarter

- (11:26) UGA – Marcus Rosemy-Jacksaint 40-yard pass from Carson Beck (Peyton Woodring kick) (Drive: 7 plays, 75 yards, 3:34; Georgia 7-0)
- (4:25) UGA – RaRa Thomas 15-yard pass from Carson Beck (Peyton Woodring kick) (Drive: 7 plays, 82 yards, 3:41; Georgia 14-0)

Second quarter

- (11:03) UGA – Oscar Delp 5-yard pass from Carson Beck (Peyton Woodring kick) (Drive: 13 plays, 95 yards, 5:58; Georgia 21-0)
- (6:44) UK – Josh Kattus 4-yard pass from Devin Leary (Alex Raynor kick) (Drive: 10 plays, 75 yards, 4:19; Georgia 21-7)
- (5:15) UGA – Peyton Woodring 36-yard field goal (Drive: 5 plays, 53 yards, 1:29; Georgia 24-7)
- (1:01) UGA – Kendall Milton 5-yard run (Peyton Woodring kick) (Drive: 5 plays, 55 yards, 2:39; Georgia 31-7)
- (0:00) UGA – Peyton Woodring 42-yard field goal (Drive: 3 plays, 38 yards, 0:22; Georgia 34-7)

Third quarter

- (10:34) UK – Ray Davis 26-yard pass from Devin Leary (run failed) (Drive: 2 plays, 28 yards, 0:52; Georgia 34-13)
- (3:27) UGA – Peyton Woodring 32-yard field goal (Drive: 12 plays, 56 yards, 7:07; Georgia 37-13)
- (0:39) UGA – Brock Bowers 21-yard pass from Carson Beck (Peyton Woodring kick) (Drive: 4 plays, 42 yards, 1:19; Georgia 44-13)

Fourth quarter

- (2:38) UGA – Andrew Paul 7-yard pass from Brock Vandagriff (Peyton Woodring kick) (Drive: 12 plays, 92 yards, 6:38; Georgia 51-13)

Statistics	UK	UGA
First downs	12	33
Total yards	50–183	73–608
Rushing yards	24–55	31–173
Passing yards	128	435
Passing: Comp–Att–Int	10–26–0	33–42–1
Time of possession	22:32	37:28

Team	Category	Player	Statistics
Kentucky	Passing	Devin Leary	10/26, 128 yards, 2 TD
Kentucky	Rushing	Ray Davis	15 carries, 59 yards
Kentucky	Receiving	Dane Key	3 receptions, 65 yards
Georgia	Passing	Carson Beck	28/35, 389 yards, 4 TD, INT
Georgia	Rushing	Daijun Edwards	9 carries, 54 yards
Georgia	Receiving	Brock Bowers	7 receptions, 132 yards, TD

=== Missouri ===
Game Seven – Missouri Tigers (5–1) at No. 24 Kentucky Wildcats (5–1) – Game summary

Quarter	1	2	3	4	Total
Missouri	0	17	3	18	38
No. 24 Kentucky	14	0	7	0	21

at Kroger Field • Lexington, Kentucky

- Date: Saturday, October 14, 2023
- Game time: 6:30 p.m. CST
- Game weather: –
- Game attendance: 61,654
- Referee: Daniel Gautreaux
- TV announcers (SECN): Tom Hart (play-by-play), Jordan Rodgers (analyst), Cole Cubelic (sideline)

Game information

First quarter

- (8:32) UK – Ray Davis 7-yard pass from Devin Leary (Alex Raynor kick) (Drive: 9 plays, 65 yards, 4:46; Kentucky 7-0)
- (2:09) UK – Devin Leary 13-yard run (Alex Raynor kick) (Drive: 9 plays, 63 yards, 4:58; Kentucky 14-0)

Second quarter

- (11:38) MIZ – Marquis Johnson 39-yard pass from Luke Bauer (Harrison Mevis kick) (Drive: 6 plays, 64 yards, 3:12; Kentucky 14-7)
- (4:44) MIZ – Harrison Mevis 25-yard field goal (Drive: 13 plays, 56 yards, 4:55; Kentucky 14-10)
- (0:15) MIZ – Theo Wease Jr. 18-yard pass from Brady Cook (Harrison Mevis kick) (Drive: 8 plays, 61 yards, 1:25; Missouri 17-14)

Third quarter

- (11:54) MIZ – Harrison Mevis 31-yard field goal (Drive: 6 plays, 17 yards, 2:53; Missouri 20-14)
- (3:39) UK – Anthony Brown-Stephens 4-yard pass from Devin Leary (Alex Raynor kick) (Drive: 7 plays, 71 yards, 3:31; Kentucky 21-20)

Fourth quarter

- (14:14) MIZ – Brady Cook 1-yard run (Cody Schrader run) (Drive: 9 plays, 70 yards, 4:16; Missouri 28-21)
- (11:07) MIZ – Cody Schrader 19-yard run (Harrison Mevis kick) (Drive: 3 plays, 34 yards, 0:57; Missouri 35-21)
- (3:17) MIZ – Harrison Mevis 29-yard field goal (Drive: 4 plays, 4 yards, 0:58; Missouri 38-21)

Statistics	MIZZ	UK
First downs	19	19
Total yards	68–324	58–299
Rushing yards	38–118	31–179
Passing yards	206	120
Passing: Comp–Att–Int	20–30–1	14–27–2
Time of possession	31:07	28:53

Team	Category	Player	Statistics
Missouri	Passing	Brady Cook	19–29, 175 yards, 1 TD, 1 INT
Missouri	Rushing	Cody Schrader	20 carries, 71 yards, 1 TD
Missouri	Receiving	Theo Wease Jr.	6 receptions, 66 yards, 1 TD
Kentucky	Passing	Devin Leary	14–27, 120 yards, 2 TD, 2 INT
Kentucky	Rushing	Ray Davis	20 carries, 128 yards
Kentucky	Receiving	Justice Dingle	2 receptions, 32 yards

=== No. 21 Tennessee (rivalry) ===
Game Eight – No. 21 Tennessee Volunteers (5–2) at Kentucky Wildcats (5–2) – Game summary

Quarter	1	2	3	4	Total
No. 21 Tennessee	10	13	3	7	33
Kentucky	0	17	7	3	27

at Kroger Field, Lexington, Kentucky

- Date: Saturday, October 28, 2023
- Game time: 7:00 p.m. EST
- Game attendance: 61,665
- Referee: Steve Marlowe
- TV announcers (ESPN): Mike Monaco (play-by-play), Jesse Palmer (analyst), Katie George (sideline)

Game information

First quarter

- (10:47) TENN – Jaylen Wright 52-yard run (Charles Campbell kick) (Drive: 5 plays, 70 yards, 1:48; Tennessee 7-0)
- (5:34) TENN – Charles Campbell 44-yard field goal (Drive: 6 plays, 8 yards, 3:03; Tennessee 10-0)

Second quarter

- (14:51) UK – Alex Raynor 28-yard field goal (Drive: 10 plays, 66 yards, 5:43; Tennessee 10-3)
- (11:13) TENN – Charles Campbell 49-yard field goal (Drive: 10 plays, 44 yards, 3:38; Tennessee 13-3)
- (7:38) UK – Barion Brown 11-yard pass from Devin Leary (Alex Raynor kick) (Drive: 7 plays, 75 yards, 3:35; Tennessee 13-10)
- (6:16) TENN – Chas Nimrod 39-yard pass from Joe Milton III (Charles Campbell kick) (Drive: 5 plays, 75 yards, 1:22; Tennessee 20-10)
- (1:46) UK – Ray Davis 7-yard run (Alex Raynor kick) (Drive: 10 plays, 75 yards, 4:30; Tennessee 20-17)
- (0:05) TENN – Charles Campbell 34-yard field goal (Drive: 7 plays, 59 yards, 1:41; Tennessee 23-17)

Third quarter

- (6:49) TENN – Charles Campbell 35-yard field goal (Drive: 8 plays, 49 yards, 3:38; Tennessee 26-17)
- (2:39) UK – Dane Key 7-yard pass from Devin Leary (Alex Raynor kick) (Drive: 6 plays, 75 yards, 4:10; Tennessee 26-24)

Fourth quarter

- (7:30) TENN – Dylan Sampson 12-yard run (Charles Campbell kick) (Drive: 12 plays, 65 yards, 3:27; Tennessee 33-24)
- (4:24) UK – Alex Raynor 28-yard field goal (Drive: 9 plays, 65 yards, 3:06; Tennessee 33-27)

Statistics	TENN	UK
First downs	24	24
Total yards	67–481	63–444
Rushing yards	47–254	24–72
Passing yards	227	372
Passing: Comp–Att–Int	17–20–0	28–39–0
Time of possession	26:56	33:04

Team	Category	Player	Statistics
Tennessee	Passing	Joe Milton III	17/20, 227 yards, 1 TD
Tennessee	Rushing	Jaylen Wright	11 carries, 120 yards, 1 TD
Tennessee	Receiving	Dont'e Thornton Jr.	3 receptions, 63 yards
Kentucky	Passing	Devin Leary	28/39, 372 yards, 2 TD
Kentucky	Rushing	Ray Davis	16 carries, 42 yards, 1 TD
Kentucky	Receiving	Dane Key	7 receptions, 113 yards, 1 TD

=== at Mississippi State ===
Game Nine – Kentucky Wildcats (5–3) at Mississippi State Bulldogs (4–4) – Game summary

Quarter	1	2	3	4	Total
Kentucky	7	14	3	0	24
Mississippi State	0	3	0	0	3

at Davis Wade Stadium • Starkville, MS

- Date: Saturday, November 4, 2023
- Game time: 7:30 PM EST
- Game weather: –
- Game attendance: 52,329
- Referee: Scott Walker
- TV announcers (SECN): Tom Hart (play-by-play), Cole Cubelic (color), Alyssa Lang (sideline)

Game information

First quarter

- (10:11) UK – Demie Sumo–Karngbaye 4-yard pass from Devin Leary (Alex Raynor kick) (Drive: 8 plays, 62 yards, 4:00; Kentucky 7-0)

Second quarter

- (8:51) MSST – Kyle Ferrie 25-yard field goal (Drive: 20 plays, 88 yards, 12:29; Kentucky 7-3)
- (6:35) UK – D'Eryk Jackson 28-yard interception return (Alex Raynor kick) (Kentucky 14-3)
- (0:52) UK – Dane Key 4-yard pass from Devin Leary (Alex Raynor kick) (Drive: 9 plays, 63 yards, 3:54; Kentucky 21-3)

Third quarter

- (5:51) UK – Alex Raynor 32-yard field goal (Drive: 12 plays, 72 yards, 5:49; Kentucky 24-3)

Fourth quarter

- – no scoring

Statistics	UK	MSST
First downs	13	15
Total yards	54–271	66–218
Rushing yards	29–110	31–73
Passing yards	161	145
Passing: Comp–Att–Int	15–25–0	17–35–1
Time of possession	30:38	29:22

Team	Category	Player	Statistics
Kentucky	Passing	Devin Leary	13/22, 156 yards, 2 TD
Kentucky	Rushing	Ray Davis	21 carries, 80 yards
Kentucky	Receiving	Tayvion Robinson	5 receptions, 91 yards
Mississippi State	Passing	Mike Wright	11/21, 78 yards, INT
Mississippi State	Rushing	Seth Davis	4 carries, 24 yards
Mississippi State	Receiving	Zavion Thomas	6 receptions, 44 yards

=== No. 8 Alabama ===
Game Ten – No. 8 Alabama Crimson Tide (8-1) at Kentucky Wildcats (6–3) – Game summary

Quarter	1	2	3	4	Total
No. 8 Alabama	21	7	7	14	49
Kentucky	7	0	7	7	21

at Kroger Field, Lexington, Kentucky

- Date: Saturday, November 11, 2023
- Game time: 12:00 p.m. EST
- Game weather: 49, Sunny, Wind NE @ 7 mph
- Game attendance: 61,936
- Referee: Ken Williamson
- TV announcers (ESPN): Joe Tessitore (play-by-play), Jordan Rodgers (color), and Katie George (sideline)

Game information

First quarter

- (9:38) ALA – Amari Niblack 26-yard pass from Jalen Milroe (Will Reichard kick) (Drive: 10 plays, 80 yards, 5:13; Alabama 7-0)
- (5:32) ALA – Kobe Prentice 40-yard pass from Jalen Milroe (Will Reichard kick) (Drive: 4 plays, 55 yards, 1:51; Alabama 14-0)
- (5:12) ALA – Jalen Milroe 1-yard run (Will Reichard kick) (Drive: 1 play, 1 yard, 0:14; Alabama 21-0)
- (1:30) UK – Tayvion Robinson 6-yard pass from Devin Leary (Alex Raynor kick) (Drive: 6 plays, 32 yards, 2:43; Alabama 21-7)

Second quarter

- (10:14) ALA – Roydell Williams 26-yard pass from Jalen Milroe (Will Reichard kick) (Drive: 5 plays, 62 yards, 2:34; Alabama 28-7)

Third quarter

- (10:53) UK – Ray Davis 2-yard run (Alex Raynor kick) (Drive: 10 plays, 75 yards, 4:07; Alabama 28-14)
- (9:36) ALA – Jalen Milroe 3-yard run (Will Reichard kick) (Drive: 9 plays, 65 yards, 1:10; Alabama 35-14)

Fourth quarter

- (14:48) ALA – Jalen Milroe 1-yard run (Will Reichard kick) (Drive: 8 plays, 38 yards, 2:54; Alabama 42-14)
- (9:46) ALA – Jam Miller 3-yard run (Will Reichard kick) (Drive: 7 plays, 66 yards, 3:21; Alabama 49-14)
- (7:46) UK – Ray Davis 1-yard run (Alex Raynor kick) (Drive: 4 plays, 75 yards, 2:00; Alabama 49-21)

Statistics	ALA	UK
First downs	23	11
Total yards	64–444	55–253
Rushing yards	39–159	24–95
Passing yards	285	158
Passing: Comp–Att–Int	16–25–1	17–31–1
Time of possession	32:06	27:54

Team	Category	Player	Statistics
Alabama	Passing	Jalen Milroe	15/22, 234 yards, 3 TD, INT
Alabama	Rushing	Jase McClellan	9 carries, 43 yards
Alabama	Receiving	Kobe Prentice	4 receptions, 74 yards, TD
Kentucky	Passing	Devin Leary	17/31, 158 yards, TD, INT
Kentucky	Rushing	Ramon Jefferson	2 carries, 73 yards
Kentucky	Receiving	Dane Key	4 receptions, 46 yards

=== at South Carolina ===
Game Eleven – Kentucky Wildcats (6-4) at South Carolina Gamecocks (4-6) – Game summary

Quarter	1	2	3	4	Total
Kentucky	0	7	7	0	14
South Carolina	10	0	0	7	17

at Williams-Brice Stadium • Columbia, South Carolina

- Date: Saturday, November 18, 2023
- Game time: 7:30 p.m. EST
- Game weather: –
- Game attendance: 77,788
- Referee: –
- TV announcers (SECN): Tom Hart (play-by-play), Jordan Rodgers (color), Cole Cubelic (sideline)

Game information

First quarter

- (7:27) SC – Xavier Legette 13-yard pass from Spencer Rattler, Mitch Jeter kick (Drive: 11 plays, 69 yards, 5:11; South Carolina 7–0)
- (0:13) SC – Mitch Jeter 23-yard field goal (Drive: 12 plays, 51 yards, 6:32; South Carolina 10–0)

Second quarter

- (10:52) UK – Barion Brown 7-yard pass from Devin Leary, Alex Raynor kick (Drive: 7 plays, 55 yards, 3:51; South Carolina 10–7)

Third quarter

- (8:42) UK – Ray Davis 31-yard run, Alex Raynor kick (Drive: 9 plays, 92 yards, 5:20; Kentucky 14–10)

Fourth quarter

- (7:44) SC – Xavier Legette 17-yard pass from Spencer Rattler, Mitch Jeter kick (Drive: 9 plays, 74 yards, 5:32; South Carolina 17–14)

Statistics	UK	SC
First downs	17	17
Total yards	293	257
Rushing yards	122	50
Passing yards	171	207
Passing: Comp–Att–Int	17–34–1	19–27–0
Time of possession	28:21	31:39

Team	Category	Player	Statistics
Kentucky	Passing	Devin Leary	17/34, 171 yards, TD, INT
Kentucky	Rushing	Ray Davis	12 carries, 61 yards, TD
Kentucky	Receiving	Dane Key	4 receptions, 51 yards
South Carolina	Passing	Spencer Rattler	19/27, 207 yards, 2 TD
South Carolina	Rushing	Mario Anderson	13 carries, 27 yards
South Carolina	Receiving	Xavier Legette	6 receptions, 94 yards, 2 TD

=== at No. 10 Louisville (rivalry) ===
Game Twelve – Kentucky Wildcats (6–5) at No. 10 Louisville Cardinals (10–1) – Game summary

Quarter	1	2	3	4	Total
Kentucky	0	7	14	17	38
No. 10 Louisville	7	3	14	7	31

at L&N Stadium • Louisville, Kentucky

- Date: Saturday, November 25, 2023
- Game time: 12:00 p.m. EST
- Game attendance: 59,225
- Referee: Lee Hendrick
- TV announcers (ABC): Joe Tessitore (play-by-play), Jesse Palmer (color), Katie George (sideline)

Game information

First quarter

- (3:40) LOU – Jawhar Jordan 1-yard run (Nick Lopez kick) (Drive: 14 plays, 70 yards, 8:19; Louisville 7-0)

Second quarter

- (8:07) UK – Dane Key 9-yard pass from Devin Leary (Alex Raynor kick) (Drive: 9 plays, 52 yards, 5:19; Tied 7-7)
- (4:25) LOU – Brock Travelstead 46-yard field goal (Drive: 7 plays, 31 yards, 3:33; Louisville 10-7)

Third quarter

- (5:50) LOU – Jawhar Jordan 1-yard run (Nick Lopez kick) (Drive: 15 plays, 75 yards, 9:10; Louisville 17-7)
- (5:38) UK – Barion Brown 100-yard kickoff return (Alex Raynor kick) (Drive: 0 plays, 100 yards, 0:12; Louisville 17-14)
- (2:48) LOU – Joey Gatewood 11-yard pass from Jack Plummer (Nick Lopez kick) (Drive: 5 plays, 51 yards, 2:41; Louisville 24-14)
- (1:49) UK – Ray Davis 20-yard pass from Devin Leary (Alex Raynor kick) (Drive: 2 plays, 75 yards, 0:59; Louisville 24-21)

Fourth quarter

- (10:21) UK – Alex Raynor 46-yard field goal (Drive: 10 plays, 20 yards, 4:45; Tied 24-24)
- (8:37) UK – Ray Davis 20-yard pass from Devin Leary (Alex Raynor kick) (Drive: 2 plays, 22 yards, 0:46; Kentucky 31-24)
- (2:33) LOU – Ahmari Huggins-Bruce 21-yard pass from Jack Plummer (Nick Lopez kick) (Drive: 4 plays, 25 yards, 2:01; Tied 31-31)
- (1:02) UK – Ray Davis 37-yard run (Alex Raynor kick) (Drive: 4 plays, 75 yards, 1:31; Kentucky 38-31)

Statistics	UK	LOU
First downs	16	23
Total yards	47–289	76–403
Rushing yards	25–83	43–161
Passing yards	206	242
Passing: Comp–Att–Int	12–22–1	24–33–1
Time of possession	23:26	36:34

Team	Category	Player	Statistics
Kentucky	Passing	Devin Leary	12/22, 206 yards, 3 TD, INT
Kentucky	Rushing	Ray Davis	14 carries, 76 yards, TD
Kentucky	Receiving	Izayah Cummings	1 reception, 55 yards
Louisville	Passing	Jack Plummer	24/33, 242 yards, 2 TD, INT
Louisville	Rushing	Jawhar Jordan	17 carries, 67 yards, 2 TD
Louisville	Receiving	Jamari Thrash	6 receptions, 60 yards

=== vs. No. 22 Clemson (Gator Bowl) ===
No. 22 Clemson Tigers (8-4) vs. Kentucky Wildcats (7-5) (2023 TaxSlayer Gator Bowl)

Quarter	1	2	3	4	Total
No. 22 Clemson	3	7	0	28	38
Kentucky	7	7	7	14	35

at EverBank Stadium • Jacksonville, Florida

- Date: Friday, December 29, 2023
- Game time: 12:00 p.m. EST
- Game weather: Sunny • Temperature: 51 °F (11 °C) • Wind: 10 mph (16 km/h) W
- Game attendance: 40,132
- Referee: John Love
- TV announcers (ESPN): Wes Durham (play-by-play), Tim Hasselbeck (color), Taylor Tannebaum (sideline)
- Box score

Game information
First quarter
- (11:16) CLEM – Johnathan Weitz 39-yard field goal (Drive: 7 plays, 39 yards, 3:37; Clemson 3–0)
- (5:00) UK – Barion Brown 22-yard run (Alex Raynor kick) (Drive: 4 plays, 73 yards, 2:14; Kentucky 7–3)

Second quarter

- (10:17) CLEM – Phil Mafah 1-yard run (Jonathan Weitz kick) (Drive: 5 plays, 59 yards, 3:02; Clemson 10–7)
- (7:44) UK – Dane Key 5-yard pass from Devin Leary (Alex Raynor kick) (Drive: 4 plays, 75 yards, 2:33; Kentucky 14–10)

Third quarter

- (14:47) UK – Barion Brown 100-yard kickoff return (Alex Raynor kick) (Drive: 0 plays, 100 yards, 0:13; Kentucky 21–10)

Fourth quarter

- (14:56) CLEM – Phil Mafah 1-yard run (pass failed) (Drive: 14 plays, 70 yards, 6:35; Kentucky 21–16)
- (7:00) CLEM – Jonathan Weitz 28-yard field goal (Drive: 7 plays, 26 yards, 3:08; Kentucky 21–19)
- (6:45) CLEM – Phil Mafah 1-yard run (Cade Klubnik pass to Tyler Brown) (Drive: 1 plays, 29 yards, 0:07; Clemson 27–21)
- (6:12) UK – Barion Brown 60-yard pass from Devin Leary (Alex Raynor kick) (Drive: 3 plays, 75 yards, 0:33; Kentucky 28–27)
- (4:20) CLEM – Jonathan Weitz 52-yard field goal (Drive: 4 plays, 2 yards, 1:42; Clemson 30–28)
- (2:39) UK – Ray Davis 1-yard run (Alex Raynor kick) (Drive: 3 plays, 75 yards, 1:41; Kentucky 35–30)
- (0:17) CLEM – Phil Mafah 3-yard run (Cade Klubnik pass to Josh Sapp) (Drive: 12 plays, 68 yards, 2:17; Clemson 38–35)

Statistics	CLEM	UK
First downs	24	12
Total yards	80–367	51–398
Rushing yards	39–103	23–92
Passing yards	264	306
Passing: Comp–Att–Int	30–41–1	16–28–2
Time of possession	34:58	25:02

Team	Category	Player	Statistics
Clemson	Passing	Cade Klubnik	30/41, 264 yards, INT
Clemson	Rushing	Phil Mafah	11 carries, 71 yards, 4 TD
Clemson	Receiving	Jake Briningstool	9 receptions, 91 yards
Kentucky	Passing	Devin Leary	16/28, 306 yards, 2 TD, 2 INT
Kentucky	Rushing	Ray Davis	13 carries, 63 yards, TD
Kentucky	Receiving	Barion Brown	3 receptions, 100 yards, TD

== Rankings ==
Ranking movements Legend: ██ Increase in ranking ██ Decrease in ranking — = Not ranked RV = Received votes
	Week															
Poll	Pre	1	2	3	4	5	6	7	8	9	10	11	12	13	14	Final
AP	RV	RV	RV	RV	RV	20	24	RV	RV	—	—	—	—	RV	RV	RV
Coaches	RV	RV	RV	RV	RV	20	23	RV	RV	RV	RV	—	—	—	—	—
CFP	Not released									—	—	—	—	—	—	Not released
