= 2023 Clemson Tigers football team =

American college football season

2023 Clemson Tigers football

Gator Bowl champion

Gator Bowl, W 38–35 vs. Kentucky
- Conference: Atlantic Coast Conference

Ranking
- Coaches: No. 20
- AP: No. 20
- Record: 9–4 (4–4 ACC)
- Head coach: Dabo Swinney (15th full, 16th overall season)
- Offensive coordinator: Garrett Riley (1st season)
- Offensive scheme: Dirt raid
- Defensive coordinator: Wes Goodwin (2nd season)
- Co-defensive coordinator: Mickey Conn (2nd season)
- Base defense: 4–3 / 4–2–5 hybrid
- Home stadium: Memorial Stadium

Uniform
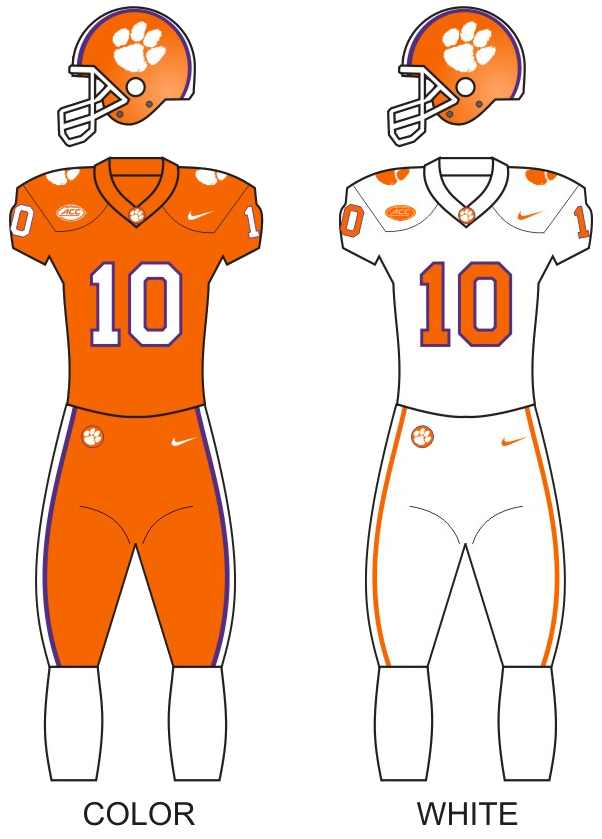

2023 Atlantic Coast Conference football standings
	Conf.			Overall
Team	W		L	W		L
No. 6 Florida State y$	8	–	0	13	–	1
No. 19 Louisville y	7	–	1	10	–	4
No. 21 NC State	6	–	2	9	–	4
Georgia Tech	5	–	3	7	–	6
Virginia Tech	5	–	3	7	–	6
No. 20 Clemson	4	–	4	9	–	4
Duke	4	–	4	8	–	5
North Carolina	4	–	4	8	–	5
Boston College	3	–	5	7	–	6
Miami (FL)	3	–	5	7	–	6
Syracuse	2	–	6	6	–	7
Pittsburgh	2	–	6	3	–	9
Virginia	2	–	6	3	–	9
Wake Forest	1	–	7	4	–	8
Championship: Florida State 16, Louisville 6
$ – Conference champion; y – Championship game participant; Rankings from AP Poll

The 2023 Clemson Tigers football team represented Clemson University as a member of the Atlantic Coast Conference (ACC) during the 2023 NCAA Division I FBS football season. The Tigers were led by Dabo Swinney, in his 16th year as Clemson's head coach. On the field, the team was led by sophomore quarterback Cade Klubnik who was rated by Rivals.com as the No. 3 player in the 2022 college football recruiting class.

Clemson was ranked ninth by Rivals.com in the 2023 college football recruiting class. Notable players committing to Clemson in the 2023 class include defensive tackle Peter Woods and defensive lineman Vic Burley. The Clemson football team played its home games at Memorial Stadium in Clemson, South Carolina.

Head coach Dabo Swinney became the winningest coach in program history after upsetting Notre Dame, 31–23, on November 4. With the win versus Notre Dame, Swinney surpassed Frank Howard in program wins with 166.

The Clemson Tigers football team drew an average home attendance of 81,334 in 2023, the 14th highest in college football.

== Offseason ==
=== Recruiting ===
Clemson's 2023 class consisted of 26 signees. The class was ranked second in the ACC and eleventh best overall by the 247Sports Composite.

College recruiting (2023)
Name	Hometown	School	Height	Weight	Commit date
Jamal Anderson; LB	Hoschton, Georgia	Mill Creek	6 ft 4 in (1.93 m)	205 lb (93 kg)	Jun 13, 2022
Jamal Anderson; LB	Recruit ratings: Rivals: 247Sports: ESPN: (84)				
Khalil Barnes; ATH	Bogart, Georgia	North Oconee	6 ft 1 in (1.85 m)	185 lb (84 kg)	Dec 16, 2022
Khalil Barnes; ATH	Recruit ratings: Rivals: 247Sports: ESPN: (78)				
Robert Billings; S	Alpharetta, Georgia	Milton	6 ft 2 in (1.88 m)	190 lb (86 kg)	Jul 31, 2022
Robert Billings; S	Recruit ratings: Rivals: 247Sports: ESPN: (78)				
Tyler Brown; WR	Greenville, South Carolina	Greenville Senior	5 ft 11 in (1.80 m)	170 lb (77 kg)	Nov 24, 2022
Tyler Brown; WR	Recruit ratings: Rivals: 247Sports: ESPN: (75)				
Victor Burley; DE	Warner Robins, Georgia	Warner Robins	6 ft 4 in (1.93 m)	275 lb (125 kg)	Jun 15, 2022
Victor Burley; DE	Recruit ratings: Rivals: 247Sports: ESPN: (86)				
Dee Crayton; ILB	Alpharetta, Georgia	Denmark	6 ft 1 in (1.85 m)	216 lb (98 kg)	Jun 18, 2022
Dee Crayton; ILB	Recruit ratings: Rivals: 247Sports: ESPN: (77)				
Marcus Dixon; TE	Warminster, Pennsylvania	Archbishop Wood	6 ft 5 in (1.96 m)	225 lb (102 kg)	Jun 14, 2022
Marcus Dixon; TE	Recruit ratings: Rivals: 247Sports: ESPN: (79)				
Jarvis Green; RB	Irmo, South Carolina	Dutch Fork	5 ft 11 in (1.80 m)	183 lb (83 kg)	Dec 13, 2022
Jarvis Green; RB	Recruit ratings: Rivals: 247Sports: ESPN: (75)				
Stephiylan Green; DT	Rome, Georgia	Rome	6 ft 4 in (1.93 m)	267 lb (121 kg)	Jun 22, 2022
Stephiylan Green; DT	Recruit ratings: Rivals: 247Sports: ESPN: (82)				
Ronan Hanafin; ATH	Cambridge, Massachusetts	Buckingham Browne & Nichols	6 ft 3 in (1.91 m)	206 lb (93 kg)	Aug 14, 2022
Ronan Hanafin; ATH	Recruit ratings: Rivals: 247Sports: ESPN: (80)				
Jamarius Haynes; RB	Roanoke, Alabama	Handley	6 ft 0 in (1.83 m)	185 lb (84 kg)	Dec 21, 2022
Jamarius Haynes; RB	Recruit ratings: Rivals: 247Sports: ESPN: (74)				
Olsen Henry; TE	Naples, Florida	First Baptist Academy	6 ft 4 in (1.93 m)	210 lb (95 kg)	Jun 7, 2022
Olsen Henry; TE	Recruit ratings: Rivals: 247Sports: ESPN: (80)				
AJ Hoffler; DE	College Park, Georgia	Woodward Academy	6 ft 4 in (1.93 m)	240 lb (110 kg)	Jun 21, 2022
AJ Hoffler; DE	Recruit ratings: Rivals: 247Sports: ESPN: (80)				
Misun Kelly; DB	Central, South Carolina	D. W. Daniel	5 ft 10 in (1.78 m)	168 lb (76 kg)	Oct 29, 2022
Misun Kelly; DB	Recruit ratings: Rivals: 247Sports: ESPN: (77)				
Noble Johnson; WR	Rockwall, Texas	Rockwall	6 ft 3 in (1.91 m)	205 lb (93 kg)	Jun 11, 2022
Noble Johnson; WR	Recruit ratings: Rivals: 247Sports: ESPN: (80)				
Shelton Lewis; CB	Stockbridge, Georgia	Stockbridge	5 ft 11 in (1.80 m)	180 lb (82 kg)	Aug 8, 2022
Shelton Lewis; CB	Recruit ratings: Rivals: 247Sports: ESPN: (77)				
David Ojiegbe; DE	Washington, D.C.	St. John's	6 ft 3 in (1.91 m)	235 lb (107 kg)	Apr 27, 2022
David Ojiegbe; DE	Recruit ratings: Rivals: 247Sports: ESPN: (81)				
Zechariah Owens; OL	McDonough, Georgia	Eagle's Landing Christian	6 ft 7 in (2.01 m)	350 lb (160 kg)	Oct 18, 2022
Zechariah Owens; OL	Recruit ratings: Rivals: 247Sports: ESPN: (83)				
Tomarrion Parker; DE	Phenix City, Alabama	Central	6 ft 4 in (1.93 m)	256 lb (116 kg)	Nov 21, 2022
Tomarrion Parker; DE	Recruit ratings: Rivals: 247Sports: ESPN: (85)				
Ian Reed; OL	Leander, Texas	Vandegrift	6 ft 6 in (1.98 m)	308 lb (140 kg)	Jun 7, 2022
Ian Reed; OL	Recruit ratings: Rivals: 247Sports: ESPN: (80)				
Harris Sewell; OT	Odessa, Texas	Permian	6 ft 3 in (1.91 m)	299 lb (136 kg)	Jun 29, 2022
Harris Sewell; OT	Recruit ratings: Rivals: 247Sports: ESPN: (85)				
Branden Strozier; CB	Alpharetta, Georgia	St. Francis	6 ft 2 in (1.88 m)	175 lb (79 kg)	May 20, 2022
Branden Strozier; CB	Recruit ratings: Rivals: 247Sports: ESPN: (79)				
Avieon Terrell; CB	Atlanta, GA	Westlake	6 ft 0 in (1.83 m)	170 lb (77 kg)	Jun 6, 2022
Avieon Terrell; CB	Recruit ratings: Rivals: 247Sports: ESPN: (80)				
Christopher Vizzina; QB	Birmingham, Alabama	Briarwood Christian School	6 ft 3 in (1.91 m)	211 lb (96 kg)	Apr 12, 2022
Christopher Vizzina; QB	Recruit ratings: Rivals: 247Sports: ESPN: (86)				
Kylen Webb; ATH	Riverview, Florida	Sumner	6 ft 1 in (1.85 m)	185 lb (84 kg)	Jun 8, 2022
Kylen Webb; ATH	Recruit ratings: Rivals: 247Sports: ESPN: (78)				
Peter Woods; DT	Alabaster, Alabama	Thompson	6 ft 2 in (1.88 m)	263 lb (119 kg)	Jul 8, 2022
Peter Woods; DT	Recruit ratings: Rivals: 247Sports: ESPN: (93)				
Overall recruit ranking: Rivals: 10 247Sports: 11
Note: In many cases, Scout, Rivals, 247Sports, On3, and ESPN may conflict in their listings of height and weight.; In these cases, the average was taken. ESPN grades are on a 100-point scale.; Sources: "Rivals commits". Rivals.; "ESPN commits". ESPN.; "2023 Team Ranking". Rivals.com.; "247Sports commits". 247Sports.

=== Players leaving for NFL ===
==== NFL draftees ====
Round	Pick	Player	Position	NFL club
1	28	Myles Murphy	DE	Cincinnati Bengals
1	29	Bryan Bresee	DT	New Orleans Saints
3	86	Trenton Simpson	LB	Baltimore Ravens
5	137	KJ Henry	DE	Washington Commanders
5	156	Jordan McFadden	OG	Los Angeles Chargers
5	175	Davis Allen	TE	Los Angeles Rams

==== Undrafted free agents ====
Player	Position	NFL club	Reference
B. T. Potter	PK	Pittsburgh Steelers	
Joseph Ngata	WR	Philadelphia Eagles	

=== Transfers ===
==== Players leaving ====
Players Leaving
Name	Number	Pos.	Height	Weight	Year	Hometown	College transferred to	Source(s)
Fred Davis II	2	CB	6'1"	200	Senior	Jacksonville, Florida	UCF	
Dacari Collins	3	WR	6'4"	212	(redshirt) Sophomore	Atlanta, Georgia	NC State	
DJ Uiagalelei	5	QB	6'4"	251	Junior	Inland Empire, California	Oregon State	
E.J. Williams	6	WR	6'3"	195	Senior	Phenix City, Alabama	Indiana	
Kobe Pace	7	RB	5'10"	205	Senior	Cedartown, Georgia	Virginia	
Kevin Swint	14	DE	6'3"	242	Senior	Carrollton, Georgia	Georgia State	
Billy Wiles	17	QB	6'3"	200	(redshirt) Sophomore	Ashburn, Virginia	Southern Miss	
Malcolm Greene	21	CB	5'10"	190	Junior	Richmond, Virginia	Virginia	
TJ Dudley	26	LB	6'3"	220	(redshirt) Freshman	Montgomery, Alabama	Ole Miss	
Etinosa Reuben	32	DL	6'3"	295	Junior	Kansas City, Missouri	Georgia Tech	
Liam Boyd	37	PK	6'1"	195	(redshirt) Freshman	Asheville, North Carolina	North Carolina	
LaVonta Bentley	42	LB	6'0"	230	Graduate	Birmingham, Alabama	Colorado	
Sergio Allen	45	LB	6'1"	230	(redshirt) Sophomore	Fort Valley, Georgia	California	
Greg Williams	99	DE	6'4"	260	(redshirt) Junior	Swansea, South Carolina	Left Program	

==== Incoming transfers ====
Incoming transfers
Name	Number	Pos.	Height	Weight	Year	Hometown	Previous School	Source(s)
Paul Tyson	12	QB	6'5"	230	(redshirt) Senior	Trussville, AL	Alabama	

==== Post-season Transfers ====
The following players entered the transfer portal during the designated 45 day window after championship selections are made.

Postseason transfers
Name	Number	Pos.	Height	Weight	Year	Hometown	College transferred to	Source(s)
Andrew Mukuba	1	S	6'0"	195	Junior	Austin, TX	Texas	
Sage Ennis	11	TE	6'4"	240	(redshirt) Junior	Graceville, FL	Virginia (Note: Originally committed to Florida A&M.)	
Brannon Spector	13	WR	6'1"	205	(redshirt) Senior	Calhoun, GA	Jacksonville State	
Hunter Helms	18	QB	6'2"	210	(redshirt) Junior	West Columbia, SC	Rhode Island	
Domonique Thomas	20	RB	5'8"	210	(redshirt) Junior	Ohatchee, AL	Georgia State	
Toriano Pride	23	CB	5'11"	190	Sophomore	St. Louis, MO	Missouri	
Lannden Zanders	36	S	6'1"	189	(redshirt) Senior	Shelby, NC	TBD	
David Ojiegbe	42	DE	6'3"	240	Freshman	Largo, MD	Pittsburgh	
Jaden Kinard	46	S	5'10"	185	(redshirt) Freshman	Pawleys Island, SC	TBD	
Mitchell Mayes	77	OL	6'3"	305	Senior	Raleigh, NC	Charlotte	
Beaux Collins	80	WR	6'3"	210	Junior	Los Angeles, CA	Notre Dame	

== Preseason ==
=== Award watchlists ===
Listed in the order that they were released

Award	Player	Position	Year
Lott Trophy	Barrett Carter	LB	SO
Dodd Trophy	Dabo Swinney	HC	–
Maxwell Award	Will Shipley	RB	JR
Davey O'Brien Award	Cade Klubnik	QB	SO
Doak Walker Award	Will Shipley	RB	JR
John Mackey Award	Jake Briningstool	TE	SO
Rimington Trophy	Will Putnam	C	GS
Butkus Award	Barrett Carter	LB	SO
Butkus Award	Jeremiah Trotter Jr.	LB	JR
Jim Thorpe Award	Andrew Mukuba	S	JR
Bronko Nagurski Trophy	Barrett Carter	LB	SO

Award	Player	Position	Year
Outland Trophy	Tyler Davis	DT	SR
Paul Hornung Award	Will Shipley	RB	JR
Wuerffel Trophy	Will Shipley	RB	JR
Walter Camp Award	Jeremiah Trotter Jr.	LB	JR
Bednarik Award	Barrett Carter	LB	SO
Bednarik Award	Tyler Davis	DT	SR
Bednarik Award	Jeremiah Trotter Jr.	LB	JR
Lombardi Award	Barrett Carter	LB	SO
Lombardi Award	Tyler Davis	DT	SR
Lombardi Award	Jeremiah Trotter Jr.	LB	JR
Earl Campbell Tyler Rose Award	Cade Klubnik	QB	SO

== Schedule ==
Clemson and the ACC announced the 2023 football schedule on January 30, 2023. The 2023 season will be the conference's first season since 2004 that its scheduling format just includes one division. The new format sets Clemson with three set conference opponents, while playing the remaining ten teams twice (home and away) in a four–year cycle. The Tigers three set conference opponents for the next four years is; Florida State, Georgia Tech, and NC State.

Date	Time	Opponent	Rank	Site	TV	Result	Attendance
September 4	8:00 p.m.	at Duke	No. 9	Wallace Wade Stadium; Durham, NC	ESPN	L 7–28	31,638
September 9	2:15 p.m.	Charleston Southern*	No. 25	Clemson Memorial Stadium; Clemson, SC	ACCN	W 66–17	81,500
September 16	8:00 p.m.	Florida Atlantic*		Clemson Memorial Stadium; Clemson, SC	ACCN	W 48–14	81,295
September 23	12:00 p.m.	No. 4 Florida State		Clemson Memorial Stadium; Clemson, SC (rivalry)	ABC	L 24–31 ^{OT}	81,500
September 30	12:00 p.m.	at Syracuse		JMA Wireless Dome; Syracuse, NY	ABC	W 31–14	40,973
October 7	3:30 p.m.	Wake Forest^{†}		Clemson Memorial Stadium; Clemson, SC	ACCN	W 17–12	80,810
October 21	8:00 p.m.	at Miami (FL)		Hard Rock Stadium; Miami Gardens, FL	ACCN	L 20–28 ^{2OT}	48,562
October 28	2:00 p.m.	at NC State		Carter-Finley Stadium; Raleigh, NC (Textile Bowl)	The CW	L 17–24	56,919
November 4	12:00 p.m.	No. 15 Notre Dame*		Clemson Memorial Stadium; Clemson, SC	ABC	W 31–23	81,500
November 11	12:00 p.m.	Georgia Tech		Clemson Memorial Stadium; Clemson, SC (rivalry)	ABC	W 42–21	81,426
November 18	3:30 p.m.	No. 20 North Carolina		Clemson Memorial Stadium; Clemson, SC	ESPN	W 31–20	81,305
November 25	7:30 p.m.	at South Carolina*	No. 24	Williams–Brice Stadium; Columbia, SC (Palmetto Bowl)	SECN	W 16–7	80,012
December 29	12:00 p.m.	vs. Kentucky*	No. 22	EverBank Field; Jacksonville, FL (TaxSlayer Gator Bowl)	ESPN	W 38–35	40,132
*Non-conference game; ^{†}Homecoming; Rankings from AP Poll (and CFP Rankings, after October 31) - Released prior to game; All times are in Eastern time

== Rankings ==
Ranking movements Legend: ██ Increase in ranking ██ Decrease in ranking — = Not ranked RV = Received votes
	Week															
Poll	Pre	1	2	3	4	5	6	7	8	9	10	11	12	13	14	Final
AP	9	25	RV	RV	RV	RV	RV	RV	—	—	RV	—	RV	RV	RV	20
Coaches	9	21	22	23	RV	RV	RV	RV	RV	—	—	—	RV	RV	RV	20
CFP	Not released									—	—	—	24	23	22	Not released

== Personnel ==
=== Coaching staff ===
Clemson Tigers football current coaching staff
Name	Position	Alma mater	Years at Clemson
Dabo Swinney	Head coach	University of Alabama (1993)	16th
Wes Goodwin	Assistant coach/defensive coordinator/linebackers coach	Mississippi State University (2009)	12th
Mike Reed	Assistant head coach/Special teams coordinator/cornerbacks coach	Boston College (1994)	11th
Mickey Conn	Assistant coach/co-defensive coordinator/safeties coach	University of Alabama (1995)	8th
Kyle Richardson	Assistant coach/passing game coordinator/tight ends coach	Appalachian State University (2001)	8th
Thomas Austin	Assistant coach/offensive linemen coach	Clemson University (2010)	6th
Lemanski Hall	Assistant coach/defensive ends coach	University of Alabama (1993)	6th
Tyler Grisham	Assistant coach/Recruiting coordinator/wide receivers coach	Clemson University (2009)	4th
C. J. Spiller	Assistant coach/running backs coach	Clemson University (2009)	3rd
Nick Eason	Assistant coach/Defensive run game coordinator/defensive tackles coach	Clemson University (2001)	2nd
Garrett Riley	Assistant coach/Offensive coordinator/Quarterbacks coach	Texas Tech (2012)	1st

=== Roster ===
As of September 4, 2023

2023 Clemson Tigers Football
Quarterbacks: 2 Cade Klubnik – sophomore (6'2 205); 12 Paul Tyson – (redshirt) senior (6'4, 215); 14 Trent Pearman – (redshirt) freshman (6'0, 190); 16 Colby Shaw – freshman (6'4, 215); 17 Christopher Vizzina – freshman (6'4, 210); 18 Hunter Helms – (redshirt) junior (6'2, 210); Running backs: 1 Will Shipley – junior (5'11, 210); 7 Phil Mafah – junior (6'1, 230); 19 Keith Adams Jr. – (redshirt) freshman (5'9, 215); 20 Domonique Thomas – (redshirt) junior (5'8, 210); 21 Jarvis Green – freshman (5'9, 200); 23 Peyton Streko – freshman (5'10, 180); 26 Jay Haynes – freshman (5'11, 185); 31 Tristen Rigby – (redshirt) sophomore (5'10, 205); 32 Wise Segars Jr. – (redshirt) sophomore (6'1, 205); 34 Kevin McNeal – (redshirt) sophomore (5'9, 200); Wide receivers: 0 Antonio Williams – sophomore (5'11, 195); 3 Noble Johnson – freshman (6'2, 210); 6 Tyler Brown – freshman (5'11, 180); 8 Adam Randall – sophomore (6'2, 225); 10 Troy Stellato – (redshirt) sophomore (6'1, 190); 13 Brannon Specter – (redshirt) senior (6'1, 205); 15 Ronan Hanafin – freshman (6'3, 210); 22 Cole Turner – (redshirt) freshman (6'1, 185); 24 Hamp Greene – (redshirt) senior (5'9, 180); 25 Blackmon Huckabee Jr. – (redshirt) junior (5'11, 190); 27 Misun Kelley – WR/DB – freshman (5'10, 180); 29 Davian Sullivan – (redshirt) senior (6'3, 205); 35 Joseph Flesch – (redshirt) sophomore (6'3, 205); 80 Beaux Collins – junior (6'3, 210); 82 Jackson Crosby – (redshirt) sophomore (5'10, 190); 83 Hampton Earle – (redshirt) senior (5'10, 195); 85 Charlie Johnson – freshman (6'4, 200); 86 Tristan Martinez – freshman (5'9, 180); 87 Michael Mankaka – (redshirt) freshman (6'0, 185); 88 Clay Swinney – (redshirt) freshman (5'10, 175); 89 Zach Jackson – (redshirt) sophomore (6'3, 205); Tight ends: 5 Josh Sapp – (redshirt) freshman (6'1, 235); 9 Jake Briningstool – junior (6'6, 230); 11 Sage Ennis – (redshirt) junior (6'4, 240); 43 Will Blackston – (redshirt) junior (6'1, 260); 44 Banks Pope – (redshirt) sophomore (6'4, 240); 81 Olsen Patt-Henry – freshman (6'3, 240); 84 Markus Dixon – freshman (6'4, 245)	Offensive linemen: 50 Collin Sadler – (redshirt) freshman (6'6, 310); 51 Peyton Pitts – (redshirt) freshman (6'6, 310); 53 Ryan Linthicum – C – (redshirt) sophomore (6'3, 305); 54 Ian Reed – freshman (6'6, 325); 55 Harris Sewell – freshman (6'4, 315); 56 Will Putnam – (redshirt) senior (6'4, 310); 57 Jackson Hall – (redshirt) freshman (6'3, 300); 59 Dietrick Pennington – (redshirt) sophomore (6'5, 340); 62 Bryce Smith – freshman (6'3, 270); 64 Walker Parks – senior (6'5, 310); 65 Chapman Pendergrass – (redshirt) freshman (6'3, 290); 67 Nathan Brooks – (redshirt) sophomore (6'4, 300); 68 Will Boggs – (redshirt) junior (6'3, 290); 69 Sam Judy – (redshirt) sophomore (6'5, 315); 70 Mason Johnstone – (redshirt) freshman (6'5, 255); 71 Tristan Leigh – (redshirt) sophomore (6'6, 315); 72 Zack Owens – freshman (6'6, 375); 73 Bryn Tucker – (redshirt) junior (6'3, 330); 74 Marcus Tate – junior (6'5, 325); 75 Trent Howard – (redshirt) junior (6'3, 295); 76 John Williams – (redshirt) junior (6'4, 305); 77 Mitchell Mayes – senior (6'3, 305); 78 Blake Miller – sophomore (6'6, 310); 79 Jake Norris – freshman (6'1, 290); Defensive ends: 3 Xavier Thomas – (redshirt) senior (6'2, 245); 7 Justin Mascoll – (redshirt) senior (6'4, 260); 12 T. J. Parker – freshman (6'3, 255); 15 Jahiem Lawson – (redshirt) freshman (6'2, 240); 34 Armon Mason – (redshirt) sophomore (6'2, 240); 42 David Ojiegbe – freshman (6'3, 240); 44 Cade Denhoff – (redshirt) sophomore (6'5, 255); 58 Evan McCutchen – (redshirt) junior (6'2, 260); 91 Zaire Patterson – (redshirt) sophomore (6'5, 260); 92 Levi Matthews – (redshirt) freshman (6'5, 235); 99 A.J. Hoffler – freshman (6'4, 250); Defensive tackles: 8 Tré Williams – (redshirt) junior (6'2, 305); 11 Peter Woods – freshman (6'2, 315); 13 Tyler Davis – (redshirt) senior (6'2, 300); 19 DeMonte Capehart – (redshirt) junior (6'5, 320); 33 Ruke Orhorhoro – (redshirt) senior (6'4, 290); 45 Vic Burley – freshman (6'4, 315); 55 Payton Page – junior (6'4, 315); 90 Stephiylan Green – freshman (6'4, 280); 93 Caden Story – (redshirt) freshman (6'3, 280); 96 Jaheim Scott – (redshirt) junior (6'1, 330); 97 Patrick Swygert – freshman (6'4, 245)	Linebackers: 0 Barrett Carter – junior (6'1, 230); 17 Wade Woodaz – sophomore (6'3, 230); 21 Kobe McCloud – (redshirt) freshman (5'10, 225); 22 Dee Crayton – freshman (6'2, 225); 32 Jamal Anderson – freshman (6'2, 215); 33 Griffin Batt – (redshirt) freshman (6'0, 225); 43 Riggs Faulkenberry – (redshirt) sophomore (6'1, 205); 50 Fletcher Cothran – (redshirt) freshman (6'3, 215); 51 Jaden Murray – (redshirt) senior (6'2, 225); 54 Jeremiah Trotter Jr. – junior (6'0, 230); 56 Reed Morrissey – (redshirt) sophomore (6'0, 220); 57 Chandler McMaster – (redshirt) freshman (6'1, 240); Cornerbacks: 2 Nate Wiggins – junior (6'2, 185); 6 Sheridan Jones – (redshirt) senior (6'0, 190); 10 Jeadyn Lukus – sophomore (6'2, 200); 14 Shelton Lewis – freshman (5'11, 185); 16 Myles Oliver – (redshirt) freshman (5'11, 180); 20 Avieon Terrell – freshman (5'11, 180); 23 Toriano Pride Jr. – sophomore (5'11, 190); 29 Branden Strozier – freshman (6'1, 180); 35 Austin Randall – (redshirt) senior (6'1, 190); Safeties: 1 Andrew Mukuba – junior (6'0, 195); 5 Sherrod Covil Jr. – sophomore (5'11, 200); 9 R.J. Mickens – senior (6'0, 210); 18 Kylon Griffin – (redshirt) freshman (5'11, 200); 24 Tyler Venables – senior (5'11, 205); 25 Jalyn Phillips – (redshirt) senior (6'1, 205); 30 Kylen Webb – freshman (6'0, 195); 31 Rob Billings – freshman (6'2, 200); 36 Khalil Barnes – freshman (6'0, 195); 37 Jacob Hendricks – (redshirt) sophomore (5'7, 180); 38 Peter Nearn – (redshirt) sophomore (6'2, 205); 39 Bubba McAtee – (redshirt) junior (6'3, 210); 41 Caleb Nix – (redshirt) freshman (6'0, 200); 46 Jaden Kinard – (redshirt) freshman (5'10, 185); 47 Boston Miller – (redshirt) freshman (6'2, 200); 48 Walt Smith – (redshirt) freshman (5'8, 180); Placekickers: 36 Quinn Castner – (redshirt) junior (5'5, 150); 38 Robert Gunn III – (redshirt) freshman (6'0, 180); 47 Hogan Morton – (redshirt) sophomore (5'9, 165); Punters: 39 Aidan Swanson – P/K – (redshirt) senior (6'3, 170); 40 Brodey Conn – P/S – (redshirt) freshman (6'0, 205); 89 Jack Smith – (redshirt) freshman (6'5, 235); Long snappers: 45 Philip Florenzo – (redshirt) junior (6'2, 240); 58 Holden Caspersen – (redshirt) sophomore (5'11, 215)

== Game summaries ==
=== At Duke ===
No. 9 Clemson Tigers at Duke Blue Devils − Game summary

Quarter	1	2	3	4	Total
No. 9 Clemson	0	7	0	0	7
Duke	3	3	7	15	28

at Wallace Wade Stadium • Durham, NC

- Date: September 4, 2023
- Game time: 8:00 p.m.
- Game weather: Temperature: 83 °F (28 °C) • Wind: SE @ 5 mph (8.0 km/h) • Weather: Clear
- Game attendance: 31,638
- Referee: Marcus Woods
- TV announcers (ESPN): Dave Pasch (play-by-play), Dusty Dvoracek (color), Tom Luginbill (sideline)

Game information

First quarter

- (9:19) Duke – Todd Pelino 22-yard field goal (Drive: 10 plays, 57 yards, 3:26; Duke 3–0)

Second quarter

- (14:19) Duke – Todd Pelino 42-yard field goal (Drive: 7 plays, 40 yards, 3:34; Duke 6–0)
- (10:09) Clemson – Will Shipley 2-yard pass from Cade Klubnik, Robert Gunn III kick (Drive: 5 plays, 18 yards, 2:12; Clemson 7–6)

Third quarter

- (12:40) Duke – Riley Leonard 44-yard rush, Todd Pelino kick (Drive: 5 plays, 75 yards, 2:20; Duke 13–7)

Fourth quarter

- (10:33) Duke – Jaquez Moore 9-yard rush, 2-point pass good (Drive: 6 plays, 33 yards, 3:53; Duke 21–7)
- (3:15) Duke – Jordan Waters 36-yard rush, Todd Pelino kick (Drive: 4 plays, 49 yards, 1:46; Duke 28–7)

Top passers

- CLEM – Cade Klubnik: 27–43, 209 yds, 1 TD, 1 INT
- DUKE – Riley Leonard: 17–33, 175 yards

Top rushers

- CLEM – Will Shipley: 17 rushes, 114 yards
- DUKE – Riley Leonard: 8 rushes, 98 yards, 1 TD

Top Receiving

- CLEM – Antonio Williams: 7 receptions, 56 yards
- DUKE – Jordan Waters: 3 receptions, 46 yards

=== Charleston Southern ===
Charleston Southern Buccaneers at No. 25 Clemson Tigers − Game summary

Quarter	1	2	3	4	Total
Charleston Southern	14	3	0	0	17
No. 25 Clemson	14	10	28	14	66

at Memorial Stadium • Clemson, SC

- Date: September 9, 2023
- Game time: 2:15 p.m.
- Game weather: Temperature: 84 °F (29 °C) • Wind: E @ 4 mph (6.4 km/h) • Weather: Cloudy
- Game attendance: 81,500
- Referee: Jeff Flanagan
- TV announcers (ACCN): Drew Carter (play-by-play), Dustin Fox (color), Alex Chappell (sideline)

Game information

First quarter

- (11:05) Clemson – Antonio Williams 10 yard pass from Cade Klubnik, Robert Gunn III kick (Drive: 10 plays, 68 yards, 3:52; Clemson 7–0)
- (8:00) Charleston Southern – JD Moore 1 yard rush, Sam Babbush kick (Drive: 1 plays, 1 yards, 0:04; Tied 7–7)
- (2:25) Charleston Southern – Leon Thomas 67 yard interception return, Babbush kick (No Drive; Charleston Southern 14–7)
- (0:14) Clemson – Phil Mafah 1 yard rush, Gunn III kick (Drive: 7 plays, 57 yards, 2:16; Tied 14–14)

Second quarter

- (12:27) Clemson – Williams 5 yard pass from Klubnik, Gunn III kick (Drive: 3 plays, 39 yards, 00:47; Clemson 21–14)
- (7:01) Charleston Southern – Babbush 45 yard field goal (Drive: 10 plays, 47 yards, 5:26; Clemson 21–17)
- (0:04) Clemson – Gunn III 23 yard field goal (Drive: 13 plays, 59 yards, 3:50; Clemson 24–17)

Third quarter

- (10:51) Clemson – Mafah 5 yard rush, Gunn III kick (Drive: 5 plays, 54 yards, 1:55; Clemson 31–17)
- (10:39) Clemson – Wade Woodaz 35 yard interception return, Gunn III kick (No Drive; Clemson 38–17)
- (7:19) Clemson – Beaux Collins 69 yard pass from Klubnik, Gunn III kick (Drive: 3 plays, 70 yards, 1:12; Clemson 45–17)
- (0:18) Clemson – Josh Sapp 25 yard pass from Klubnik, Gunn III kick (Drive: 10 plays, 91 yards, 4:15; Clemson 52–17)

Fourth quarter

- (8:20) Clemson – Jay Haynes 8 yard rush, Hogan Morton kick (Drive: 11 plays, 90 yards, 5:39; Clemson 59–17)
- (4:18) Clemson – Haynes 6 yard pass from Paul Tyson, Quinn Castner kick (Drive: 5 plays, 63 yards, 2:18; Clemson 66–17)

Top passers

- CLEM – Cade Klubnik: 28–37, 315 yards, 4 TD, 1 INT
- CSU – Tony Bartalo: 6–14, 61 yards, 1 INT

Top rushers

- CLEM – Will Shipley: 9 rushes, 73 yards
- CSU – Timothy Ruff: 9 rushes, 23 yards

Top Receiving

- CLEM – Beaux Collins: 7 receptions, 137 yards, 1 TD
- CSU – Tyree Taylor: 1 reception, 23 yards

=== Florida Atlantic ===
Florida Atlantic Owls at Clemson Tigers − Game summary

Quarter	1	2	3	4	Total
Florida Atlantic	0	0	0	14	14
Clemson	20	14	7	7	48

at Memorial Stadium • Clemson, SC

- Date: September 16, 2023
- Game time: 8:00 p.m.
- Game weather: Temperature: 72 °F (22 °C) • Wind: W @ 4 mph (6.4 km/h) • Weather: Cloudy
- Game attendance: 81,295
- Referee: Tim Hedgepeth
- TV announcers (ACCN): Wes Durham (play-by-play), Tim Hasselbeck (color), Taylor Tannebaum (sideline)

Game information

First quarter

- (13:35) Clemson – Nate Wiggins 46 yard interception return, Robert Gunn III kick (No Drive; Clemson 7–0)
- (7:27) Clemson – Tyler Brown 30 yard pass from Cade Klubnik, PAT missed (Drive: 9 plays, 79 yards, 3:52; Clemson 13–0)
- (1:20) Clemson – Jake Briningstool 7 yard pass from Klubnick, Gunn III PAT (Drive: 4 plays, 26 yards, 1:42; Clemson 20–0)

Second quarter

- (12:19) Clemson – Phil Mafah 19 yard rush, Gunn III PAT (Drive: 5 plays, 63 yards, 1:51; Clemson 27–0)
- (3:25) Clemson – Klubnik 1 yard rush, Gunn III PAT (Drive: 9 plays, 71 yards, 3:59; Clemson 34–0)

Third quarter

- (2:56) Clemson – Brown 2 yard pass from Klubnik, Gunn III PAT (Drive: 5 plays, 26 yards, 1:22; Clemson 41–0)

Fourth quarter

- (12:07) FAU – Michael Johnson Jr. 2 yard rush, Logan Lupo PAT (Drive: 15 plays, 75 yards, 5:49; Clemson 41–7)
- (8:00) Clemson – Domonique Thomas 2 yard rush, Gunn III PAT (Drive: 10 plays, 80 yards, 4:00; Clemson 48–7)
- (1:03) FAU – Devin Price 30 yard pass from Javion Posey, Lupo PAT (Drive: 4 plays, 45 yards, 1:10; Clemson 48–14)

Top passers

- CLEM – Cade Klubnik: 16–27, 169 yards, 3 TDs
- FAU – Daniel Richardson: 18–32, 120 yards, 1 INT

Top rushers

- CLEM – Phil Mafah: 5 rushes, 42 yards, 1 TD
- FAU – Kobe Lewis: 14 rushes, 49 yards

Top Receiving

- CLEM – Adam Randall: 2 receptions, 51 yards
- FAU – LaJohntay Wester: 12 receptions, 108 yards

=== No. 4 Florida State ===
No. 4 Florida State Seminoles at Clemson Tigers − Game summary

Quarter	1	2	3	4	OT	Total
No. 4 Florida State	0	14	10	0	7	31
Clemson	3	14	7	0	0	24

at Memorial Stadium • Clemson, SC

- Date: September 23, 2023
- Game time: 12:00 p.m.
- Game weather: Temperature: 77 °F (25 °C) • Wind: NW @ 3 mph (4.8 km/h) • Weather: Sunny
- Game attendance: 81,500
- Referee: Jeff Heaser
- TV announcers (ABC): Sean McDonough (play-by-play), Greg McElroy (analyst), Molly McGrath (sideline)

Game information

First quarter

- (1:47) Clemson – Jonathan Weitz 30 yard field goal, (Drive: 15 plays, 79 yards, 6:01; Clemson 3–0)

Second quarter

- (11:33) Clemson – Cade Klubnik 1 yard rush, Weitz kick, (Drive: 7 plays, 51 yards, 3:20; Clemson 10–0)
- (5:10) Florida State – Keon Coleman 7 yard pass from Jordan Travis, Ryan Fitzgerald kick, (Drive: 13 plays, 75 yards, 6:23; Clemson 10–7)
- (2:12) Clemson – Will Shipley 10 yard pass from Klubnik, Wetiz kick, (Drive: 7 plays, 71 yards, 2:51; Clemson 17–7)
- (0:22) Florida State – Travis 2 yard rush, Fitzgerald kick, (Drive: 5 plays, 75 yards, 1:50; Clemson 17–14)

Third quarter

- (12:00) Florida State – Fitzgerald 48 yard field goal, (Drive: 5 plays, 45 yards, 3:00; Tied 17–17)
- (3:32) Clemson – Shipley 1 yard rush, Weitz kick, (Drive: 11 plays, 77 yards, 4:54; Clemson 24–17)
- (0:31) Florida State – Kalen DeLoach 56 yard fumble return, Fitzgerald kick, (No Drive; Tied 24–24)

Fourth quarter

- None

Overtime 1

- Florida State – Coleman 24 yard pass from Travis, (Drive: 2 plays, 25 yards; Florida State 31–24)

Top passers

- CLEM – Cade Klubnik: 25–38, 283 yards, 1 TD
- FSU – Jordan Travis: 21–37, 289 yards, 2 TDs

Top rushers

- CLEM – Phil Mafah: 10 rushes, 69 yards
- FSU – Trey Benson: 7 rushes, 25 yards

Top Receiving

- CLEM – Tyler Brown: 5 receptions, 84 yards
- FSU – Johnny Wilson: 5 receptions, 94 yards

=== At Syracuse ===
Clemson Tigers at Syracuse Orange − Game summary

Quarter	1	2	3	4	Total
Clemson	14	7	3	7	31
Syracuse	7	0	0	7	14

at JMA Wireless Dome • Syracuse, NY

- Date: September 30, 2023
- Game time: 12:00 p.m.
- Game weather: Temperature: N/A Indoors • Wind: N/A Indoors • Weather: N/A Indoors
- Game attendance: 40,974
- Referee: Stuart Mullins
- TV announcers (ABC): Dave Pasch (play-by-play), Dusty Dvoracek (color), Tom Luginbill (sideline)

Game information

First quarter

- (10:03) Clemson – Tony Stellato 14 yard pass from Cade Klubnik, Jonathan Weitz kick, (Drive: 7 plays, 55 yards, 3:14; Clemson 7–0)
- (5:53) Clemson – Will Shipley 2 yard rush, Weitz kick, (Drive: 2 plays, 3 yards, 0:42; Clemson 14–0)
- (2:26) Syracuse – Dan Villari 28 yard pass from Garrett Shrader, Brady Denaburg kick, (Drive: 8 plays, 75 yards, 3:27; Clemson 14–7)

Second quarter

- (2:23) Clemson – Beaux Collins 47 yard pass from Klubnik, Weitz kick, (Drive: 4 plays, 61 yards, 1:02; Clemson 21–7)

Third quarter

- (11:03) Clemson – Weitz 38 yard field goal, (Drive: 7 plays, 51 yards, 3:57; Clemson 24–7)

Fourth quarter

- (12:23) Syracuse – LeQuint Allen 6 yard pass from Shrader, Denaburg kick, (Drive: 5 plays, 42 yards, 1:42; Clemson 24–14)
- (6:38) Clemson – Phil Mafah 32 yard rush, Weitz kick, (Drive: 1 plays, 32 yards, 0:07; Clemson 31–14)

Top passers

- CLEM – Cade Klubnik: 23–37, 263 yards, 2 TDs
- CUSE – Garrett Shrader: 15–29, 181 yards, 2 TDs, 1 INT

Top rushers

- CLEM – Will Shipley: 18 rushes, 61 yards, 1 TD
- CUSE – LeQuint Allen: 14 rushes, 52 yards

Top Receiving

- CLEM – Tyler Brown: 9 receptions, 153 yards
- CUSE – Dan Villari: 2 receptions, 65 yards, 1 TD

=== Wake Forest ===
Wake Forest Demon Deacons at Clemson Tigers − Game summary

Quarter	1	2	3	4	Total
Wake Forest	3	0	3	6	12
Clemson	0	7	3	7	17

at Memorial Stadium • Clemson, SC

- Date: October 7, 2023
- Game time: 3:30 p.m.
- Game weather: Temperature: 74 °F (23 °C) • Wind: NW @ 10 mph (16 km/h) • Weather: Sunny
- Game attendance: 80,810
- Referee: Jerry Magallanes
- TV announcers (ACCN): Chris Cotter (play-by-play), Mark Herzlich (color), Sherree Burruss (sideline)

Game information

First quarter

- (2:25) Wake Forest – Matthew Dennis 35 yard field goal, (Drive: 7 plays, 28 yards, 3:15; Wake Forest 3–0)

Second quarter

- (10:18) Clemson – Cade Klubnik 7 yard rush, Jonathan Weitz kick, (Drive: 16 plays, 75 yards, 7:07; Clemson 7–3)

Third quarter

- (7:15) Clemson – Weitz 25 yard field goal, (Drive: 15 plays, 67 yards, 7:45; Clemson 10–3)
- (2:20) Wake Forest – Dennis 22 yard field goal, (Drive: 12 plays, 71 yards, 4:55; Clemson 10–6)

Fourth quarter

- (5:49) Clemson – Will Shipley 1 yard rush, Weitz kick, (Drive: 8 plays, 61 yards, 3:45; Clemson 17–6)
- (1:34) Wake Forest – Demond Claiborne 3 yard rush, 2 point attempt failed (Drive: 11 plays, 75 yards, 4:15; Clemson 17–12)

Top passers

- CLEM – Cade Klubnik: 18–28, 131 yards
- WAKE – Mitch Griffis: 15–25, 137 yards

Top rushers

- CLEM – Will Shipley: 19 rushes, 97 yards, 1 TD
- WAKE – Demond Claiborne: 19 rushes, 60 yards, 1 TD

Top Receiving

- CLEM – Beaux Collins: 5 receptions, 50 yards
- WAKE – Jahmal Banks: 8 receptions, 55 yards

=== At Miami (FL) ===
Clemson Tigers at Miami Hurricanes − Game summary

Quarter	1	2	3	4	OT	2OT	Total
Clemson	0	7	10	0	3	0	20
Miami (FL)	7	0	0	10	3	8	28

at Hard Rock Stadium • Miami Gardens, FL

- Date: October 21, 2023
- Game time: 8:00 p.m.
- Game weather: Temperature: 79 °F (26 °C) • Wind: N @ 8 mph (13 km/h) • Weather: Clear
- Game attendance: 48,562
- Referee: Marcus Woods
- TV announcers (ACCN): Wes Durham (play-by-play), Tim Hasselbeck (color), Taylor Tannebaum (sideline)

Game information

First quarter

- (3:53) Miami – Jacolby George 0 yard run, Andres Borregales kick, (Drive: 1 play, 80 yards, 0:14; Miami 7–0)

Second quarter

- (8:09) Clemson – Jake Briningstool 32 yard pass from Cade Klubnik, Jonathan Weitz kick, (Drive: 7 plays, 90 yards, 3:06; Tied 7–7)

Third quarter

- (8:38) Clemson – Weitz 41 yard field goal, (Drive: 8 plays, 58 yards, 4:01; Clemson 10–7)
- (2:01) Clemson – Briningstool 19 yard pass from Klubnik, Weitz kick, (Drive: 2 plays, 64 yards, 1:01; Clemson 17–7)

Fourth quarter

- (8:00) Miami – Colbie Young 11 yard pass from Emory Williams, Borregales kick, (Drive: 15 plays, 75 yards, 9:01; Clemson 17–14)
- (1:51) Miami – Borregales 38 yard field goal, (Drive: 10 plays, 43 yards, 5:14; Tied 17–17)

Overtime 1

- (0:00) Clemson – Weitz 31 yard field goal, (Drive: 7 plays, 11 yards; Clemson 20–17)
- (0:00) Miami – Borregales 35 yard field goal, (Drive: 4 plays, 8 yards; Tied 20–20)

Overtime 2

- (0:00) Miami – Ajay Allen 3 yard rush, Allen rush, (Drive: 5 plays, 25 yards; Miami 28–20)

Top passers

- CLEM – Cade Klubnik: 18–34, 314 yards, 2 TDs, 1 INT
- MIA – Emory Williams: 24–33, 151 yards, 1 TD, 1 INT

Top rushers

- CLEM – Will Shipley: 15 rushes, 44 yards
- MIA – Brashard Smith: 4 rushes, 87 yards

Top Receiving

- CLEM – Jake Briningstool: 5 receptions, 126 yards, 2 TDs
- MIA – Colbie Young: 6 receptions, 76 yards, 1 TD

=== At NC State ===
Clemson Tigers at NC State Wolfpack − Game summary

Quarter	1	2	3	4	Total
Clemson	0	7	0	10	17
NC State	7	3	14	0	24

at Carter-Finley Stadium • Raleigh, NC

- Date: October 28, 2023
- Game time: 2:00 p.m.
- Game weather: Temperature: 81 °F (27 °C) • Wind: NW @ 4 mph (6.4 km/h) • Weather: Sunny
- Game attendance: 56,919
- Referee: Jeff Heaser
- TV announcers (The CW): Tom Werme (play-by-play), Jason Bates (analyst), Treavor Scales (sideline)

Game information

First quarter

- (7:18) NC State – Kevin Concepcion 9 yard pass from MJ Morris, Brayden Narveson kick, (Drive: 4 plays, 60 yards, 2:23; NC State 7–0)

Second quarter

- (12:11) NC State – Narveson 41 yard field goal, (Drive: 8 plays, 55 yards, 4:52; NC State 10–0)
- (8:24) Clemson – Phil Mafah 1 yard rush, Jonathan Weitz kick, (Drive: 9 plays, 75 yards, 3:47; NC State 10–7)

Third quarter

- (10:01) NC State – Payton Wilson 15 yard interception return, Narveson kick, (Drive: 1 play, 15 yards, 0:08; NC State 17–7)
- (4:35) NC State – Concepcion 72 yard pass from Morris, Narveson kick, (Drive: 3 plays, 80 yards, 1:40; NC State 24–7)

Fourth quarter

- (14:57) Clemson – Mafah 1 yard rush, Weitz kick, (Drive: 10 plays, 75 yards, 4:38; NC State 24–14)
- (6:57) Clemson – Weitz 19 yard field goal, (Drive: 5 plays, 49 yards, 1:47; NC State 24–17)

Top passers

- CLEM – Cade Klubnik: 33–50, 263 yards, 2 INTs
- NCST – MJ Morris: 11–20, 138 yards, 2TDs

Top rushers

- CLEM – Phil Mafah: 16 rushes, 84 yards
- NCST – Kevin Concepcion: 2 rushes, 51 yards

Top Receiving

- CLEM – Jake Briningstool: 8 receptions, 93 yards
- NCST – Kevin Concepcion: 5 receptions, 83 yards, 2 TDs

=== Notre Dame ===
Notre Dame Fighting Irish at Clemson Tigers − Game summary

Quarter	1	2	3	4	Total
Notre Dame	3	6	14	0	23
Clemson	10	14	7	0	31

at Memorial Stadium • Clemson, SC

- Date: November 4, 2023
- Game time: 12:00 p.m.
- Game weather: Temperature: 58 °F (14 °C) • Wind: NE @ 1 mph (1.6 km/h) • Weather: Clear
- Game attendance: 81,500
- Referee: Adam Savoie
- TV announcers (ABC): Sean McDonough (play-by-play), Greg McElroy (analyst), Molly McGrath (sideline)

Game information

First quarter

- (10:36) Notre Dame – Spencer Shrader 43 yard field goal, (Drive: 7 plays, 50 yards, 4:24; Notre Dame 3–0)
- (6:57) Clemson – Phil Mafah 41 yard rush, Johnathan Weitz kick, (Drive: 1 play, 41 yards, 0:07; Clemson 7–3)
- (2:08) Clemson – Weitz 21 yard field goal, (Drive: 7 plays, 18 yards, 2:26; Clemson 10–3)

Second quarter

- (13:34) Notre Dame – Shrader 30 yard field goal, (Drive: 8 plays, 63 yards, 3:34; Clemson 10–6)
- (9:11) Clemson – Tyler Brown 9 yard pass from Cade Klubnik, Weitz kick, (Drive: 9 plays, 75 yards, 4:23; Clemson 17–6)
- (8:33) Clemson – Jeremiah Trotter Jr. 28 yard interception return, Weitz kick, (Drive: 1 play, 28 yards, 0:38; Clemson 24–6)
- (1:32) Notre Dame – Shrader 23 yard field goal, (Drive: 12 plays, 60 yards, 7:01; Clemson 24–9)

Third quarter

- (13:57) Notre Dame – Audric Estimé 2 yard rush, Shrader kick, (Drive: 1 play, 2 yards, 0:04; Clemson 24–16)
- (8:08) Clemson – Mafah 1 yard rush, Weitz kick, (Drive: 11 plays, 75 yards, 5:49; Clemson 31–16)
- (6:05) Notre Dame – Sam Hartman 26 yard rush, Shrader kick, (Drive: 4 plays, 74 yards, 1:56; Clemson 31–23)

Fourth quarter None

Top passers

- CLEM – Cade Klubnik: 13–26, 109 yards, 1 TD, 1 INT
- UND – Sam Hartman: 13–30, 146 yards, 1 INT

Top rushers

- CLEM – Phil Mafah: 36 carries, 186 yards, 2 TDs
- UND – Audric Estimé: 17 carries, 87 yards, 1 TD

Top Receiving

- CLEM – Beaux Collins: 3 receptions, 37 yards
- UND – Audric Estimé: 4 receptions, 33 yards

=== Georgia Tech ===
Georgia Tech Yellow Jackets at Clemson Tigers − Game summary

Quarter	1	2	3	4	Total
Georgia Tech	7	0	0	14	21
Clemson	0	21	7	14	42

at Memorial Stadium • Clemson, SC

- Date: November 11, 2023
- Game time: 12:00 p.m.
- Game weather: Temperature: 51 °F (11 °C) • Wind: NE @ 9 mph (14 km/h) • Weather: Cloudy
- Game attendance: 81,426
- Referee: Stuart Mullins
- TV announcers (ABC): Mark Jones (play-by-play), Louis Riddick (analyst), Quint Kessenich (sideline)

Game information

First quarter

- (6:36) Georgia Tech – Haynes King 4 yard rush, Aidan Birr kick (Drive: 4 plays, 25 yards, 2:12; Georgia Tech 7–0)

Second quarter

- (11:45) Clemson – Beaux Collins 5 yard pass from Cade Klubnik, Johnathan Weitz kick, (Drive: 18 plays, 75 yards, 9:51; Tied 7–7)
- (7:17) Clemson – Tyler Brown 3 yard pass from Klubnik, Weitz kick, (Drive: 8 plays, 42 yards, 3:12; Clemson 14–7)
- (1:09) Clemson – Will Shipley 32 yard rush, Weitz kick, (Drive: 9 plays, 92 yards, 4:10; Clemson 21–7)

Third quarter

- (7:05) Clemson – Jake Briningstool 5 yard pass from Klubnik, Weitz kick, (Drive: 7 plays, 52 yards, 3:33; Clemson 28–7)

Fourth quarter

- (14:22) Clemson – Josh Sapp 13 yard pass from Klubnik, Weitz kick, (Drive: 5 plays, 31 yards, 0:33; Clemson 35–7)
- (12:46) Clemson – Shelton Lewis 46 yard interception return, Weitz kick, (Drive: 1 play, 46 yards, 1:36; Clemson 42–7)
- (10:11) Georgia Tech – Dontae Smith 32 yard pass from King, Birr kick, (Drive: 7 plays, 75 yards, 2:35; Clemson 42–12)
- (1:49) Georgia Tech – Dylan Leonard 4 yard pass from King, Birr kick, (Drive: 14 plays, 67 yards, 4:12; Clemson 42–21)

Top passers

- CLEM – Cade Klubnik: 23–34, 205 yards, 4 TDs, 1 INT
- GT – Haynes King: 13–31, 129 yards, 2 TDs, 4 INTs

Top rushers

- CLEM – Phil Mafah: 17 rushes, 96 yards
- GT – Jamal Haynes: 15 rushes, 104 yards

Top Receiving

- CLEM – Beaux Collins: 5 receptions, 65 yards, 1 TD
- GT – Dontae Smith: 2 receptions 30 yards, 1 TD

=== North Carolina ===
North Carolina Tar Heels at Clemson Tigers − Game summary

Quarter	1	2	3	4	Total
No. 20 North Carolina	7	0	7	6	20
Clemson	0	14	14	3	31

at Memorial Stadium • Clemson, SC

- Date: November 18, 2023
- Game time: 3:30 p.m.
- Game weather: Temperature: 75 °F (24 °C) • Wind: S @ 2 mph (3.2 km/h) • Weather: Sunny
- Game attendance: 81,305
- Referee: Marcus Woods
- TV announcers (ESPN): Bob Wischusen (play-by-play), Robert Griffin III (analyst), Kris Budden (sideline)

Game information

First quarter

- (4:31) North Carolina – J.J. Jones 33 yard pass from Drake Maye, Noah Burnette kick, (Drive: 4 plays, 46 yards, 1:22; North Carolina 7–0)

Second quarter

- (10:10) Clemson – Jake Briningstool 3 yard pass from Cade Klubnik, Johnathan Weitz kick, (Drive: 14 plays, 80 yards, 6:29; Tied 7–7)
- (0:03) Clemson – Klubnik 3 yard rush, Weitz kick, (Drive: 11 plays, 57 yards, 1:11; Clemson 14–7)

Third quarter

- (7:15) Clemson – Phil Mafah 3 yard rush, Weitz kick, (Drive: 7 plays, 56 yards, 3:33; Clemson 21–7)
- (4:31) North Carolina – Omarion Hampton 55 yard rush, Burnette kick, (Drive: 3 plays, 75 yards, 0:55; Clemson 21–14)
- (3:19) Clemson – Will Shipley 33 yard rush, Weitz kick, (Drive: 6 plays, 75 yards, 3:01; Clemson 28–14)

Fourth quarter

- (3:19) Clemson – Weitz 21 yard field goal, (Drive: 11 plays, 88 yards, 5:14; Clemson 31–14)
- (4:31) North Carolina – Hampton 3 yard rush, Nate McCollum pass from Maye failed, (Drive: 9 plays, 75 yards, 3:30; Clemson 31–20)

Top passers

- CLEM – Cade Klubnik: 21–32, 219 yards, 1 TD
- UNC – Drake Maye: 16–36, 209 yards, 1 TD, 1 INT

Top rushers

- CLEM – Will Shipley: 18 rushes, 126 yards, 1 TD
- UNC – Omarion Hampton: 19 rushes, 178 yards, 2 TDs

Top Receiving

- CLEM – Troy Stellato: 6 receptions, 50 yards
- UNC – Devontez Walker: 4 receptions, 70 yards

=== at South Carolina (rivalry) ===
Game Twelve– No. 24 Clemson Tigers (7-4) at South Carolina Gamecocks (5-6) – Game summary

Quarter	1	2	3	4	Total
No. 24 Clemson	10	3	3	0	16
South Carolina	7	0	0	0	7

at Williams-Brice Stadium • Columbia, South Carolina

- Date: Saturday, November 25, 2023
- Game time: 7:30 p.m. EST
- Game weather: Temperature: 48 °F (9 °C) • Wind: NE @ 3 mph (4.8 km/h) • Weather: Clear
- Game attendance: 80,172
- Referee: Jeff Flanagan
- TV announcers (SECN): Taylor Zarzour (play-by-play), Matt Stinchcomb (analyst), Alyssa Lang (sideline)

Game information

First quarter

- (14:25) CLEM – Khalil Barnes 42-yard fumble recovery (Johnathan Weitz kick) (Clemson 7–0)
- (6:39) SC – Luke Doty 1-yard run (Mitch Jeter kick) (Drive: 12 plays, 81 yards, 5:37; Tied 7–7)
- (0:43) CLEM – Jonathan Weitz 50-yard field goal (Drive: 11 plays, 42 yards, 5:56; Clemson 10–7)

Second quarter

- (5:07) CLEM – Jonathan Weitz 49-yard field goal (Drive: 7 plays, 13 yards, 2:37; Clemson 13–7)

Third quarter

- (13:16) CLEM – Jonathan Weitz 42 yard field goal (Drive: 6 plays, 50 yards, 1:44; Clemson 16–7)

Fourth quarter

- No scoring

Statistics	CLEM	SC
First downs	19	12
Total yards	73–319	56–169
Rushing yards	46–219	24–57
Passing yards	100	112
Passing: Comp–Att–Int	15–27–1	16–32–1
Time of possession	38:00	22:00

Team	Category	Player	Statistics
Clemson	Passing	Cade Klubnik	15/27, 100 yards, INT
Clemson	Rushing	Phil Mafah	19 rushes, 89 yards
Clemson	Receiving	Tyler Brown	5 receptions, 40 yards
South Carolina	Passing	Spencer Rattler	16/32, 112 yards, INT
South Carolina	Rushing	Mario Anderson	13 rushes, 35 yards
South Carolina	Receiving	Xavier Legette	6 receptions, 68 yards

=== Vs. Kentucky ===
No. 22 Clemson Tigers (8-4) vs. Kentucky Wildcats (7-5) (2023 TaxSlayer Gator Bowl)

Quarter	1	2	3	4	Total
No. 22 Clemson	3	7	0	28	38
Kentucky	7	7	7	14	35

at EverBank Stadium • Jacksonville, Florida

- Date: Friday, December 29, 2023
- Game time: 12:00 p.m. EST
- Game weather: Sunny • Temperature: 51 °F (11 °C) • Wind: 10 mph (16 km/h) W
- Game attendance: 40,132
- Referee: John Love
- TV announcers (ESPN): Wes Durham (play-by-play), Tim Hasselbeck (color), Taylor Tannebaum (sideline)
- Box score

Game information
First quarter
- (11:16) CLEM – Johnathan Weitz 39-yard field goal (Drive: 7 plays, 39 yards, 3:37; Clemson 3–0)
- (5:00) UK – Barion Brown 22-yard run (Alex Raynor kick) (Drive: 4 plays, 73 yards, 2:14; Kentucky 7–3)

Second quarter

- (10:17) CLEM – Phil Mafah 1-yard run (Jonathan Weitz kick) (Drive: 5 plays, 59 yards, 3:02; Clemson 10–7)
- (7:44) UK – Dane Key 5-yard pass from Devin Leary (Alex Raynor kick) (Drive: 4 plays, 75 yards, 2:33; Kentucky 14–10)

Third quarter

- (14:47) UK – Barion Brown 100-yard kickoff return (Alex Raynor kick) (Drive: 0 plays, 100 yards, 0:13; Kentucky 21–10)

Fourth quarter

- (14:56) CLEM – Phil Mafah 1-yard run (pass failed) (Drive: 14 plays, 70 yards, 6:35; Kentucky 21–16)
- (7:00) CLEM – Jonathan Weitz 28-yard field goal (Drive: 7 plays, 26 yards, 3:08; Kentucky 21–19)
- (6:45) CLEM – Phil Mafah 1-yard run (Cade Klubnik pass to Tyler Brown) (Drive: 1 plays, 29 yards, 0:07; Clemson 27–21)
- (6:12) UK – Barion Brown 60-yard pass from Devin Leary (Alex Raynor kick) (Drive: 3 plays, 75 yards, 0:33; Kentucky 28–27)
- (4:20) CLEM – Jonathan Weitz 52-yard field goal (Drive: 4 plays, 2 yards, 1:42; Clemson 30–28)
- (2:39) UK – Ray Davis 1-yard run (Alex Raynor kick) (Drive: 3 plays, 75 yards, 1:41; Kentucky 35–30)
- (0:17) CLEM – Phil Mafah 3-yard run (Cade Klubnik pass to Josh Sapp) (Drive: 12 plays, 68 yards, 2:17; Clemson 38–35)

Statistics	CLEM	UK
First downs	24	12
Total yards	80–367	51–398
Rushing yards	39–103	23–92
Passing yards	264	306
Passing: Comp–Att–Int	30–41–1	16–28–2
Time of possession	34:58	25:02

Team	Category	Player	Statistics
Clemson	Passing	Cade Klubnik	30/41, 264 yards, INT
Clemson	Rushing	Phil Mafah	11 carries, 71 yards, 4 TD
Clemson	Receiving	Jake Briningstool	9 receptions, 91 yards
Kentucky	Passing	Devin Leary	16/28, 306 yards, 2 TD, 2 INT
Kentucky	Rushing	Ray Davis	13 carries, 63 yards, TD
Kentucky	Receiving	Barion Brown	3 receptions, 100 yards, TD

== Awards and honors ==
All-American
Player	AP	AFCA	FWAA	TSN	WCFF	Designation
Jeremiah Trotter Jr.	2	2	–	2	–	None
The NCAA recognizes a selection to all five of the AP, AFCA, FWAA, TSN and WCFF first teams for unanimous selections and three of five for consensus selections. HM = Honorable mention. Source:

All-ACC
Player	Position	Team
Tyler Davis	DT	First-Team
Jeremiah Trotter Jr.	LB	First-Team
Nate Wiggins	CB	First-Team
Barrett Carter	LB	Second Team
Jake Briningstool	TE	Third Team
Blake Miller	OT	Third Team
Will Putnam	C	Third Team
Ruke Orhorhoro	DT	Third Team
Will Shipley	RB	Honorable Mention
Will Shipley	AP	Honorable Mention
Phil Mafah	RB	Honorable Mention
Xavier Thomas	DE	Honorable Mention
T. J. Parker	DE	Honorable Mention
Khalil Barnes	S	Honorable Mention
Andrew Mukuba	S	Honorable Mention
R. J. Mickens	S	Honorable Mention

== Players drafted into the NFL ==
Round	Pick	Player	Position	NFL club
1	30	Nate Wiggins	CB	Baltimore Ravens
2	35	Ruke Orhorhoro	DT	Atlanta Falcons
4	127	Will Shipley	RB	Philadelphia Eagles
5	138	Xavier Thomas	DE	Arizona Cardinals
5	155	Jeremiah Trotter Jr.	LB	Philadelphia Eagles
6	196	Tyler Davis	DT	Los Angeles Rams
