= Hanafin =

Hanafin is a surname. Notable people with the surname include:

- Des Hanafin (1930–2017), Irish politician
- John Hanafin (born 1960), Irish politician
- Lorcan Hanafin (born 2002), British racing driver
- Mary Hanafin (born 1959), Irish politician
- Ronan Hanafin (born 2004), American football player
- Will Hanafin, Irish journalist, television producer and radio personality
