= Ruke Orhorhoro =

Nigerian-American football player (born 2001)

No. 99 – Jacksonville Jaguars
- Position: Defensive tackle
- Roster status: Active

Personal information
- Born: October 13, 2001 (age 25); Lagos, Nigeria
- Listed height: 6 ft 4 in (1.93 m)
- Listed weight: 295 lb (134 kg)

Career information
- High school: River Rouge (River Rouge, Michigan, U.S.)
- College: Clemson (2019–2023)
- NFL draft: 2024: 2nd round, 35th overall pick

Career history
- Atlanta Falcons (2024–2025); Jacksonville Jaguars (2026–present)

Awards and highlights
- Third-team All-ACC (2023)

Career NFL statistics as of Week 10, 2026
- Total tackles: 49
- Sacks: 4.5
- Pass deflections: 1
- Stats at Pro Football Reference

Oghenerukevwe "Ruke" Orhorhoro (/oʊˈroʊroʊroʊ/ born October 13, 2001) is a Nigerian-American professional football defensive tackle for the Jacksonville Jaguars of the National Football League (NFL). He played college football at Clemson, and selected by the Atlanta Falcons in the second round of the 2024 NFL draft.

== Early life ==
Orhorhoro was born in Lagos, Nigeria, and moved to Michigan in the United States when he was nine. He attended River Rouge High School in River Rouge, Michigan, where he played basketball and football starting his junior year in 2017. Orhorhoro committed to Clemson University to play college football.

== College career ==
As a true freshman at Clemson in 2019, Orhorhoro played in nine games and had five tackles and a half-sack. In 2020, he played in four games and took a medical redshirt. He started nine of 13 games in 2021, recording 36 tackles and 2.5 sacks. Orhorhoro returned to Clemson in 2022 and 2023.

== Professional career ==
Pre-draft measurables
Height	Weight	Arm length	Hand span	Wingspan	40-yard dash	10-yard split	20-yard split	20-yard shuttle	Three-cone drill	Vertical jump	Broad jump	Bench press
6 ft 4 in (1.93 m)	294 lb (133 kg)	34 in (0.86 m)	9 3/8 in (0.24 m)	6 ft 7 1/2 in (2.02 m)	4.89 s	1.67 s	2.80 s	4.67 s	7.40 s	32.0 in (0.81 m)	9 ft 8 in (2.95 m)	29 reps
All values from NFL Combine/Pro Day

=== Atlanta Falcons ===
Orhorhoro was selected in the second round with the 35th overall pick in the 2024 NFL draft by the Atlanta Falcons.

=== Jacksonville Jaguars ===
On April 17, 2026, the Falcons traded Orhorhoro to the Jacksonville Jaguars in exchange for defensive tackle, Maason Smith, who was selected thirteen picks behind Orhorhoro in the NFL draft.

== Career statistics ==
Legend
**Bold**	Career high

=== NFL ===
Year	Team	Games		Tackles						Fumbles	
Year	Team	GP	GS	Cmb	Solo	Ast	Sck	TfL	PD	FF	FR
2024	ATL	8	0	11	4	7	0.0	1	0	0	0
2025	ATL	17	8	**25**	**12**	**13**	**3.5**	**4**	**1**	0	0
2026	JAX	9	0	13	6	7	1.0	1	0	0	0
Career		33	8	49	22	27	4.5	6	1	0	0

=== College ===
Year	Team	Games	Tackles				
Year	Team	Games	Total	Solo	Ast	TFL	Sacks
2019	Clemson	3	4	2	2	1.5	0.5
2020	Clemson	1	0	0	0	0	0
2021	Clemson	13	**36**	11	**25**	**8**	2.5
2022	Clemson	14	23	**13**	10	**8**	4
2023	Clemson	12	25	**13**	12	**8**	**5**
Career		43	88	39	49	25.5	12
