= Barion Brown =

American football player (born 2003)

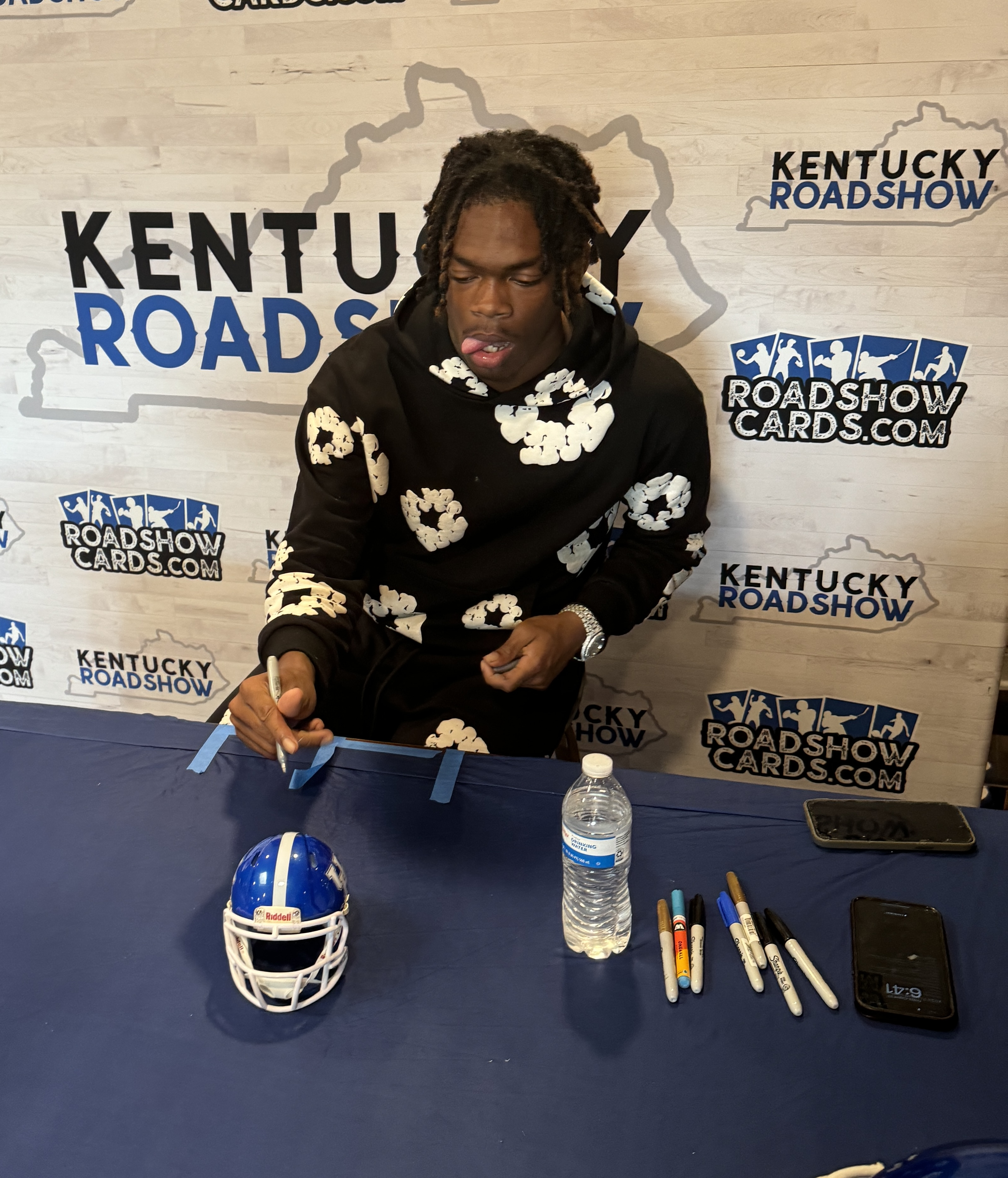
- Brown at an autograph signing in 2024

No. 19 – New Orleans Saints
- Positions: Wide receiver, return specialist
- Roster status: Active

Personal information
- Born: December 12, 2003 (age 22); Nashville, Tennessee, U.S.
- Listed height: 5 ft 11 in (1.80 m)
- Listed weight: 177 lb (80 kg)

Career information
- High school: Pearl-Cohn (Nashville)
- College: Kentucky (2022–2024); LSU (2025)
- NFL draft: 2026: 6th round, 190th overall pick

Career history
- New Orleans Saints (2026–present)

Awards and highlights
- First-team All-American (2023); First-team All-SEC (2024); Second-team All-SEC (2023)

Career NFL statistics as of Week 7, 2026
- Receptions: 4
- Receiving yards: 62
- Return yards: 593
- Stats at Pro Football Reference

Barion Brown (born December 12, 2003) is an American professional football wide receiver and return specialist for the New Orleans Saints of the National Football League (NFL). He played college football for the Kentucky Wildcats and the LSU Tigers and was selected by the Saints in the sixth round of the 2026 NFL draft.

== Early life ==
Brown grew up in Nashville, Tennessee and attended Pearl-Cohn Comprehensive High School. As a senior, he rushed for 897 yards and 10 touchdowns on 59 carries and also caught 22 passes for 303 yards and three touchdowns. At the end of the season, Brown was named the Tennessee Titans Class 4A Mr. Football. He also ran track at Pearl-Cohn and won state championships in the 100-meter and 200-meter dash as a junior and as a senior. Brown committed to play college football at Kentucky after considering offers from Alabama, TCU, and Ole Miss. He was the highest-rated receiver to sign with the school.

== College career ==
=== Kentucky ===
Brown entered his freshman season at Kentucky as the Wildcats' primary kick returner. He returned a kickoff 100 yards for a touchdown in his college debut against Miami of Ohio and was later named the Southeastern Conference (SEC) Special Teams Player of the Week. Brown was also named the SEC co-Freshman of the Week for weeks 4 and 5. He finished the season with 50 receptions for 628 yards and four touchdowns. On December 5, 2024, Brown entered the transfer portal.

=== LSU ===
Brown transferred to LSU on December 14, 2024.

On November 29, 2025, before playing against Oklahoma, Brown used his cleats to tear up the grass on the Gaylord Family Oklahoma Memorial Stadium during the team's pregame warmup, which became viral on social media.

=== Statistics ===
Legend
	Led NCAA Division I FBS
**Bold**	Career high

Year	Team	Games		Receiving				Rushing				Kick returns				Punt returns			
Year	Team	GP	GS	Rec	Yds	Avg	TD	Att	Yds	Avg	TD	Ret	Yds	Avg	TD	Ret	Yds	Avg	TD
2022	Kentucky	13	7	50	628	12.6	4	4	-2	-0.5	0	16	440	27.5	1	7	28	4.0	0
2023	Kentucky	13	11	43	539	12.5	4	12	147	12.3	1	16	576	36.0	3	3	51	17.0	0
2024	Kentucky	11	9	29	361	12.4	3	13	50	3.8	1	18	449	24.9	1	1	6	6.0	0
2025	LSU	13	9	53	532	10.0	1	3	33	11.0	0	15	445	29.7	1	0	0	0.0	0
Career		38	28	175	2,060	11.8	12	32	228	7.1	2	65	1910	29.4	6	11	85	7.7	0

== Professional career ==
Pre-draft measurables
Height	Weight	Arm length	Hand span	Wingspan	40-yard dash	10-yard split	20-yard split	Vertical jump	Broad jump
5 ft 11 in (1.80 m)	177 lb (80 kg)	31 1/2 in (0.80 m)	9 in (0.23 m)	6 ft 3 3/4 in (1.92 m)	4.40 s	1.62 s	2.60 s	32.0 in (0.81 m)	9 ft 10 in (3.00 m)
All values from NFL Combine/Pro Day

Brown was selected by the New Orleans Saints in the sixth round with the 190th overall pick of the 2026 NFL draft.
