= Will Shipley =

American football player (born 2002)

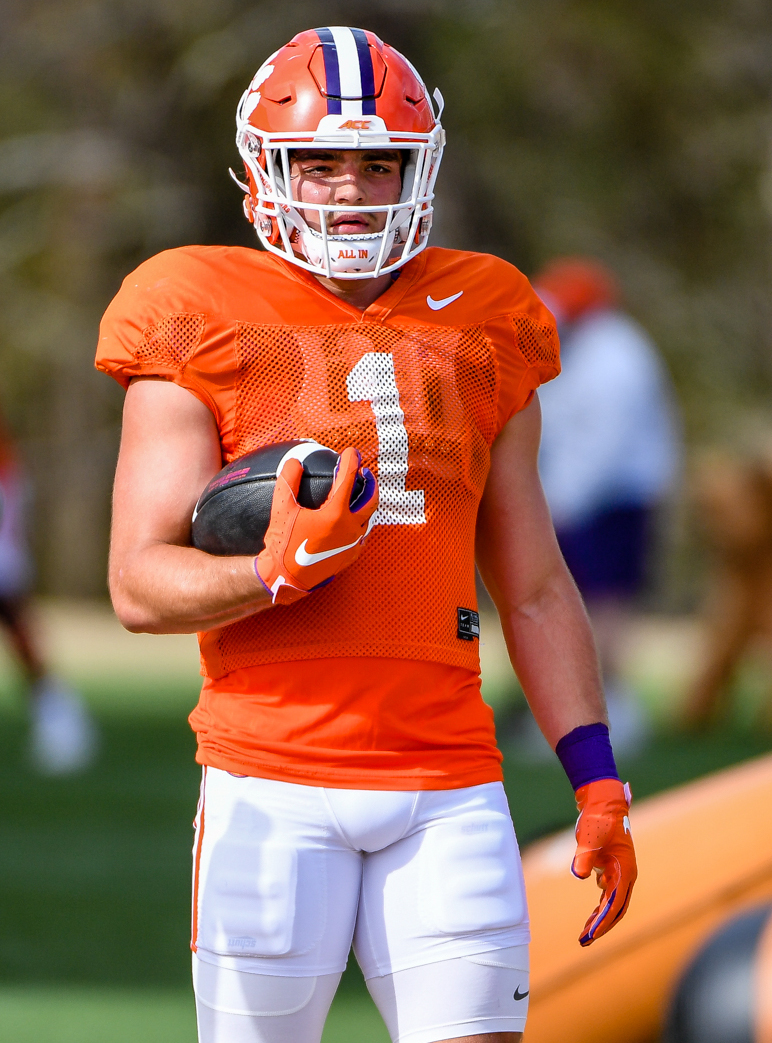
- Shipley with the Clemson Tigers in 2021

No. 28 – Philadelphia Eagles
- Positions: Running back, kickoff returner
- Roster status: Active

Personal information
- Born: August 29, 2002 (age 24); Weddington, North Carolina, U.S.
- Listed height: 5 ft 11 in (1.80 m)
- Listed weight: 209 lb (95 kg)

Career information
- High school: Weddington (Matthews, North Carolina)
- College: Clemson (2021–2023)
- NFL draft: 2024: 4th round, 127th overall pick

Career history
- Philadelphia Eagles (2024–present)

Awards and highlights
- Super Bowl champion (LIX); First-team All-American (2022); First-team All-ACC (2022)

Career NFL statistics as of Week 5, 2026
- Rushing attempts: 64
- Rushing yards: 188
- Rushing touchdowns: 2
- Receptions: 18
- Receiving yards: 122
- Return yards: 1,084
- Stats at Pro Football Reference

William L. Shipley (born August 29, 2002) is an American professional football running back and kickoff returner for the Philadelphia Eagles of the National Football League (NFL). He played college football for the Clemson Tigers.

== Early life ==
Shipley attended Weddington High School in Weddington, North Carolina. Shipley was rated the second-best running back in his class by ESPN and committed to play college football at Clemson during his junior year. Shipley did not play his senior season because it was moved to spring of 2021 due to the COVID-19 pandemic. He finished his high school career 4,173 rushing yards on 503 carries, 1,411 receiving yards on 84 catches, and scored 80 total touchdowns.

Shipley’s number one sport in high school was Taekwondo and his second was lacrosse. He was recognized as a five star recruit for lacrosse and captured a state lacrosse title with his brother who went on to play for the University of Pennsylvania.

== College career ==
Shipley joined the Clemson Tigers in January 2021 as an early enrollee. He was named Clemson's starting running back ahead of the team's game against North Carolina State. Shipley finished the season with 739 yards and 11 touchdowns on 149 carries, 16 receptions for 116 yards, and 14 kickoffs returned for 380 yards.

Shipley entered his sophomore season on the watchlist for the Wuerffel Trophy and the Paul Hornung Award. He was named first team All-ACC as an all-purpose player after rushing 210 times for 1,182 yards and 15 touchdowns, catching 38 passes for 242 yards, and returning 13 kickoffs for 324 yards.

=== Statistics ===
Year	Team	Games		Rushing				Receiving				Kick returns			
Year	Team	GP	GS	Att	Yds	Avg	TD	Rec	Yds	Avg	TD	Ret	Yds	Avg	TD
2021	Clemson	10	5	149	739	5.0	11	16	116	7.3	0	14	380	27.1	0
2022	Clemson	14	14	210	1,182	5.6	15	38	242	6.4	0	13	324	24.9	0
2023	Clemson	12	12	167	827	5.0	5	31	244	7.9	2	7	200	28.6	0
Career		36	31	526	2,748	5.2	31	85	602	7.1	2	34	907	26.6	0

== Professional career ==
Pre-draft measurables
Height	Weight	Arm length	Hand span	Wingspan	40-yard dash	10-yard split	20-yard split	20-yard shuttle	Three-cone drill	Vertical jump	Broad jump	Bench press
5 ft 11 in (1.80 m)	206 lb (93 kg)	30 1/4 in (0.77 m)	9 5/8 in (0.24 m)	6 ft 2 1/8 in (1.88 m)	4.39 s	1.54 s	2.59 s	4.11 s	6.81 s	38.5 in (0.98 m)	10 ft 2 in (3.10 m)	16 reps
All values from NFL Combine/Pro Day

Shipley was selected in the fourth round with the 127th overall pick in the 2024 NFL draft by the Philadelphia Eagles.

Shipley scored the first touchdown of his career in the final minutes of the NFC Championship Game, carrying the ball on every play of an 80-yard drive, including a 16-yard run, a 57-yard run and a 2-yard touchdown run. Shipley was part of the Eagles team that won Super Bowl LIX 40–22 over the Kansas City Chiefs. He had one kick return for 25 yards in the game.

=== 2026 season ===
In Week 5, against the Jacksonville Jaguars in London, England, Shipley rushed for 5 attempts, and a total of 6 yards. He capped this off with a 2-yard touchdown run, the second of his career, before leaving the game with a foot injury in the second quarter of the 19-17 loss. On October 16, Shipley was placed on injured reserve, and later activated on November 21.
