= Phil Mafah =

American football player (born 2002)

No. 36 – New York Giants
- Position: Running back
- Roster status: Practice squad

Personal information
- Born: October 24, 2002 (age 24); Loganville, Georgia, U.S.
- Listed height: 6 ft 1 in (1.85 m)
- Listed weight: 232 lb (105 kg)

Career information
- High school: Grayson (Loganville)
- College: Clemson (2021–2024)
- NFL draft: 2025: 7th round, 239th overall pick

Career history
- Dallas Cowboys (2025); New York Giants (2026–present)

Awards and highlights
- Third-team All-ACC (2024)

Career NFL statistics as of 2025
- Games played: 1
- Rushing yards: 18
- Rushing average: 3.6
- Rushing touchdowns: 1
- Receptions: 2
- Receiving yards: 11
- Stats at Pro Football Reference

Phil Mafah (born October 24, 2002) is an American professional football running back for the New York Giants of the National Football League (NFL). He played college football for the Clemson Tigers and was selected by the Cowboys in the seventh round of the 2025 NFL draft.

== Early life ==
Mafah attended Grayson High School in Loganville, Georgia. During his career, he had 2,526 rushing yards and 37 touchdowns. He committed to Clemson University to play college football on August 29, 2019.

College recruiting
Name	Hometown	School	Height	Weight	Commit date
Phil Mafah; RB	Loganville, Georgia	Grayson High School	6 ft 1 in (1.85 m)	223 lb (101 kg)	Aug 29, 2019
Phil Mafah; RB	Recruit ratings: Rivals: 247Sports: ESPN:				
Overall recruit ranking:
Note: In many cases, Scout, Rivals, 247Sports, On3, and ESPN may conflict in their listings of height and weight.; In these cases, the average was taken. ESPN grades are on a 100-point scale.; Sources: "2021 Clemson Football Commitment List". Rivals.; "Clemson Tigers 2021 Player Commits". ESPN.; "2021 Team Ranking". Rivals.com.; "Clemson 2021 Football Commits". 247Sports.

== College career ==
As a true freshman at Clemson in 2021, Mafah played in nine games with one start and had 68 carries for 292 yards and three touchdowns. As the backup to Will Shipley in 2022, he started one of 14 games, rushing for 515 yards on 98 carries and four touchdowns. Mafah split carries with Shipley in 2023. Against Notre Dame, he had 186 yards on a school record tying 36 carries.

=== Statistics ===
Year	Team	Games	Rushing				Receiving			
Year	Team	GP	Att	Yds	Avg	TD	Rec	Yds	Avg	TD
2021	Clemson	9	68	292	4.3	3	7	50	7.1	0
2022	Clemson	14	98	515	5.3	4	9	48	5.3	0
2023	Clemson	13	179	965	5.4	13	21	108	5.1	0
2024	Clemson	14	216	1,115	5.2	8	21	103	4.9	0
Career		50	561	2,887	5.1	28	58	309	5.3	0

== Professional career ==
Pre-draft measurables
Height	Weight	Arm length	Hand span	Wingspan
6 ft 0 5/8 in (1.84 m)	234 lb (106 kg)	31 3/8 in (0.80 m)	9 1/2 in (0.24 m)	6 ft 5 5/8 in (1.97 m)
All values from NFL Combine

=== Dallas Cowboys ===
Mafah was selected by the Dallas Cowboys with the 239th overall pick in the seventh round of the 2025 NFL draft. He was placed on injured reserve to begin the regular season due to a shoulder injury. Mafah was activated on January 3, 2026.

On August 30, 2026, Mafah was waived by the Cowboys as a part of final roster cuts.

=== New York Giants ===
On September 14, 2026, Mafah signed with the New York Giants' practice squad.

== NFL career statistics ==
Year	Team	Games		Rushing					Receiving					Fumbles	
Year	Team	GP	GS	Att	Yds	Avg	Lng	TD	Rec	Yds	Avg	Lng	TD	Fum	Lost
2025	DAL	1	0	5	18	3.6	8	1	2	11	5.5	10	0	0	0
Career		1	0	5	18	3.6	8	1	2	11	5.5	10	0	0	0
