= Ronan Hanafin =

American football player (born 2004)

No. 5 – Clemson Tigers
- Position: Safety
- Class: Junior

Personal information
- Born: February 4, 2004 (age 22)
- Listed height: 6 ft 3 in (1.91 m)
- Listed weight: 215 lb (98 kg)

Career information
- High school: Buckingham Browne & Nichols School (Cambridge, Massachusetts)
- College: Clemson (2023–present)
- Stats at ESPN

Ronan Hanafin (born February 4, 2004) is an American college football safety for the Clemson Tigers.

== Early life ==
Hanafin attended Buckingham Browne & Nichols School in Cambridge, Massachusetts. He was rated as a four-star recruit and received offers from schools such as Notre Dame, Alabama, Clemson, Georgia, Ohio State, Oklahoma, USC, LSU, Miami, Michigan, Tennessee, Penn State, Wisconsin, Nebraska, Boston College, Pittsburgh, Virginia Tech, Virginia, Maryland, West Virginia, Syracuse, Vanderbilt, and Duke. Hanafin committed to play college football for the Clemson Tigers.

== College career ==
In week 12 of the 2023 season, Hanafin recovered an onside kick versus Georgia Tech. During his freshman season in 2023, he played in 11 games, mainly on special teams. Heading into the 2024 season, Hanafin switched his position from wide receiver to safety. During the 2024 season, Hanafin tallied 13 tackles and a pass deflection. Heading into the 2025 season, he was named one of the Tigers starting safeties. In his first start in the season opener, Hanafin notched 12 tackles, a pass deflection, and a forced fumble.

=== College statistics ===
Year	Team	Class	GP	Tackles					Interceptions					Fumbles	
Year	Team	Class	GP	Solo	Ast	Tot	Loss	Sk	Int	Yds	Avg	TD	PD	FF	FR
2023	Clemson	FR	11	2	1	3	0.0	0.0	0	0	0.0	0	0	0	0
2024	Clemson	SO	14	7	2	9	0.0	0.0	0	0	0.0	0	0	0	0
2025	Clemson	JR	13	47	17	64	1.0	0.0	1	13	13.0	0	4	2	0
Career			38	56	20	76	1.0	0.0	1	13	13.0	0	4	2	0
