= Jake Briningstool =

American football player (born 2002)

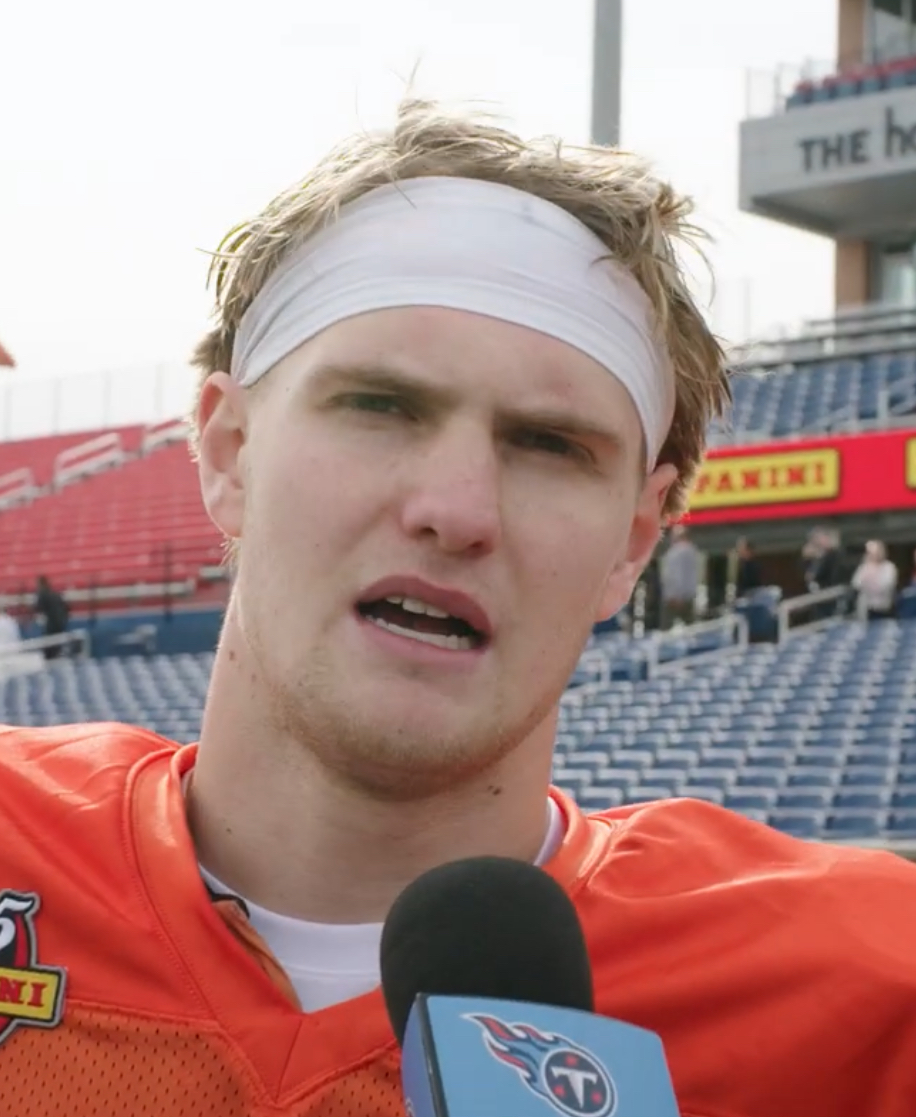
- Briningstool in 2025

No. 88 – Kansas City Chiefs
- Position: Tight end
- Roster status: Active

Personal information
- Born: December 9, 2002 (age 23); Brentwood, Tennessee, U.S.
- Listed height: 6 ft 6 in (1.98 m)
- Listed weight: 240 lb (109 kg)

Career information
- High school: Ravenwood (Brentwood)
- College: Clemson (2021–2024)
- NFL draft: 2025: undrafted

Career history
- Kansas City Chiefs (2025–present)

Awards and highlights
- 2× Third-team All-ACC (2023, 2024)

Career NFL statistics
- Receptions: 1
- Receiving yards: 9
- Receiving touchdowns: 0
- Stats at Pro Football Reference

Jake Briningstool (born December 9, 2002) is an American professional football tight end for the Kansas City Chiefs of the National Football League (NFL). He played college football for the Clemson Tigers.

== Early life ==
Briningstool grew up in Brentwood, Tennessee and attended Ravenwood High School. He caught 39 passes for 774 yards and 12 touchdowns as a senior. Considered a four-star recruit by the 247Sports Composite Rankings, Briningstool was listed as the No. 1 tight end in the nation in 2021, and the No. 1 prospect in Tennessee. He committed to play college football at Clemson over offers from Alabama, Georgia, Michigan State, and Tennessee.

== College career ==
Briningstool joined the Clemson Tigers as an early enrollee. He played in eight games as a freshman and caught three passes for 67 yards. Briningstool entered his sophomore season as the Tigers' second tight end.

College statistics
Year	Team	GP	Receiving			
Year	Team	GP	Rec	Yds	Avg	TD
2021	Clemson	8	3	67	22.3	1
2022	Clemson	14	25	285	11.4	4
2023	Clemson	13	50	498	10.0	5
2024	Clemson	13	49	530	10.8	7
Career		48	127	1,380	10.9	17

== Professional career ==
Pre-draft measurables
Height	Weight	Arm length	Hand span	Wingspan	40-yard dash	10-yard split	20-yard split	Vertical jump	Broad jump
6 ft 5 5/8 in (1.97 m)	241 lb (109 kg)	31 1/2 in (0.80 m)	8 5/8 in (0.22 m)	6 ft 5 5/8 in (1.97 m)	4.75 s	1.60 s	2.77 s	31.0 in (0.79 m)	9 ft 7 in (2.92 m)
All values from NFL Combine

Briningstool signed with the Kansas City Chiefs as an undrafted free agent on May 3, 2025.
