= Devin Leary =

American football player (born 1999)

Profile
- Position: Quarterback

Personal information
- Born: September 10, 1999 (age 27); Sicklerville, New Jersey, U.S.
- Listed height: 6 ft 1 in (1.85 m)
- Listed weight: 215 lb (98 kg)

Career information
- High school: Timber Creek; (Gloucester Township, New Jersey)
- College: NC State (2018–2022); Kentucky (2023)
- NFL draft: 2024: 6th round, 218th overall pick

Career history
- Baltimore Ravens (2024)*
- * Offseason or practice squad member only
- Stats at Pro Football Reference

Devin Leary (born September 10, 1999) is an American professional football quarterback. He played college football for the NC State Wolfpack and Kentucky Wildcats. Leary was selected by the Ravens in the sixth round of the 2024 NFL draft.

== Early life ==
Leary attended Timber Creek Regional High School in Gloucester Township, New Jersey. During his high school career he set the state record for career passing yards (9,672) and passing touchdowns (117). During his junior year, he set the state record for passing yards (3,688) and touchdowns in a season (48). He was the New Jersey Gatorade Football Player of the Year in 2016 and 2017. Leary committed to North Carolina State University to play college football.

== College career ==
Leary redshirted his first year at NC State in 2018. In 2019, he opened the season as a backup before starting the final five games of the season. He completed 101 of 210 passes for 1,219 yards, eight touchdowns and five interceptions. As a sophomore in 2020, he played in only four games before suffering a broken fibula. He completed 66 of 110 passes for 890 yards, eight touchdowns and two interceptions. Leary entered 2021 as the starting quarterback. On December 5, 2022, after a season cut short by a pectoral muscle injury, Leary entered the NCAA transfer portal. On December 20, it was reported that Leary had committed to Kentucky.

=== Statistics ===
Season	Team	Games			Passing								Rushing			
Season	Team	GP	GS	Record	Cmp	Att	Pct	Yds	Avg	TD	Int	Rtg	Att	Yds	Avg	TD
2018	NC State	Redshirt (redshirt)														
2019	NC State	8	5	0−5	101	210	48.1	1,219	5.8	8	5	104.7	40	46	1.2	0
2020	NC State	4	4	3−1	66	110	60.0	890	8.1	8	2	148.3	19	7	0.4	0
2021	NC State	12	12	9−3	283	431	65.7	3,433	8.0	35	5	157.0	54	-73	-1.4	2
2022	NC State	6	6	5−1	118	193	61.1	1,265	6.6	11	4	130.9	23	1	0.0	3
2023	Kentucky	12	12	7–5	193	343	56.3	2,440	7.1	23	10	132.3	39	-55	-1.4	1
Career		42	39	24−15	761	1,287	59.1	9,247	7.2	85	26	137.2	175	-76	-0.4	6

== Professional career ==
Pre-draft measurables
Height	Weight	Arm length	Hand span
6 ft 1 1/4 in (1.86 m)	215 lb (98 kg)	30 7/8 in (0.78 m)	9 1/2 in (0.24 m)
All values from NFL Combine

=== Baltimore Ravens ===
Leary was selected by the Baltimore Ravens in the sixth round (218th overall) of the 2024 NFL draft. He was cut on August 27, 2024 and re-signed to the practice squad the next day. Leary signed a reserve/future contract with the Ravens on January 21, 2025. He was waived on August 26, as part of final roster cuts.
