= Tyler Brown (American football) =

American football player (born 2005)

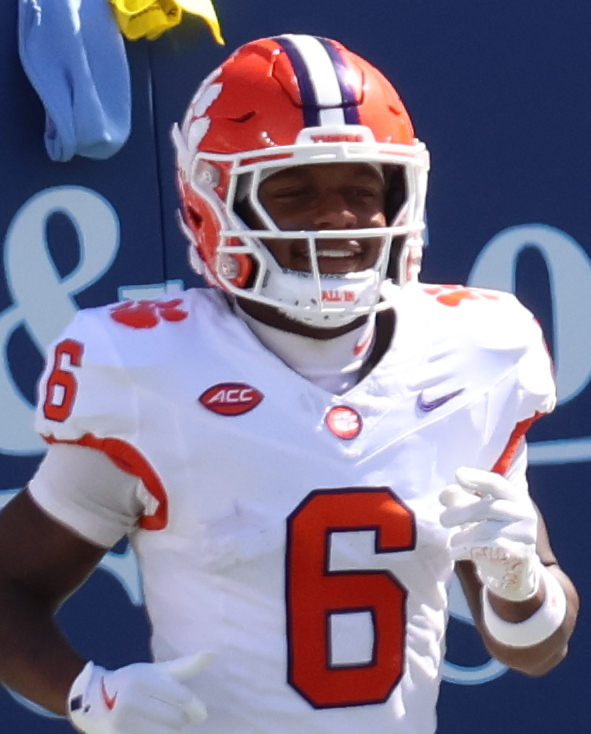
- Brown with the Clemson Tigers in 2025

No. 6 – Clemson Tigers
- Position: Wide receiver
- Class: Redshirt Sophomore

Personal information
- Born: June 14, 2005 (age 21)
- Listed height: 5 ft 11 in (1.80 m)
- Listed weight: 185 lb (84 kg)

Career information
- High school: Greenville Senior (Greenville, South Carolina)
- College: Clemson (2023–present)
- Stats at ESPN

Tyler Brown (born June 14, 2005) is an American college football wide receiver for the Clemson Tigers.

== Early life ==
Brown attended Greenville Senior High School in Greenville, South Carolina. During his career, he had 148 receptions for 2,501 yards and 32 touchdowns. He originally committed to the University of Minnesota to play college football before changing to Clemson University.

== College career ==
Brown earned immediate playing time his true freshman year with the Tigers in 2023. In his first career game, he had two receptions for 21 yards.

=== College statistics ===
Year	Team	GP	Receiving				Rushing				Kick returns			
Year	Team	GP	Rec	Yds	Avg	TD	Att	Yds	Avg	TD	Ret	Yds	Avg	TD
2023	Clemson	13	52	531	10.2	4	2	41	20.5	0	5	74	14.8	0
2024	Clemson	6	5	30	6.0	0	1	-2	-2.0	0	0	0	0	0
2025	Clemson	13	22	191	8.7	0	6	71	11.8	1	2	41	20.5	0
Career		32	79	752	9.5	4	9	110	12.2	1	7	115	16.4	0
