= 2023 UCF Knights football team =

American college football season

2023 UCF Knights football

Gasparilla Bowl, L 17–30 vs. Georgia Tech
- Conference: Big 12 Conference
- Record: 6–7 (3–6 Big 12)
- Head coach: Gus Malzahn (3rd season)
- Offensive coordinator: Darin Hinshaw (1st season)
- Offensive scheme: Spread option
- Defensive coordinator: Addison Williams (1st season)
- Co-defensive coordinator: David Gibbs (3rd season)
- Base defense: 4–2–5
- Home stadium: FBC Mortgage Stadium

2023 Big 12 Conference football standings
	Conf.			Overall
Team	W		L	W		L
No. 3 Texas y$^	8	–	1	12	–	2
No. 16 Oklahoma State y	7	–	2	10	–	4
No. 15 Oklahoma	7	–	2	10	–	3
Iowa State	6	–	3	7	–	6
No. 18 Kansas State	6	–	3	9	–	4
West Virginia	6	–	3	9	–	4
Texas Tech	5	–	4	7	–	6
No. 23 Kansas	5	–	4	9	–	4
UCF	3	–	6	6	–	7
TCU	3	–	6	5	–	7
Houston	2	–	7	4	–	8
BYU	2	–	7	5	–	7
Baylor	2	–	7	3	–	9
Cincinnati	1	–	8	3	–	9
Championship: Texas 49, Oklahoma State 21
^ – College Football Playoff participant; $ – Conference champion; y – Championship game participant; Rankings from AP Poll

The 2023 UCF Knights football team represented the University of Central Florida (UCF) as a member of the Big 12 Conference during the 2023 NCAA Division I FBS football season. The Knights were led by Gus Malzahn in his third year as the Knights head coach. The team played their home games at FBC Mortgage Stadium in Orlando, Florida.

UCF officially moved into the Big 12 Conference for the 2023 season. In doing so, the Knights became the first NCAA football program to play at every sanctioned level: Division III, Division II, Division I-AA, Division I-A (Independent), Group of Five, and Power Five.

In their first season as part of the Big 12, the Knights jumped out to a 3–0 start, including a last-second victory at Boise State. However, quarterback John Rhys Plumlee suffered an ankle injury in the final minute of the Boise State game, which would sideline him for a month. Redshirt sophomore Timmy McClain took over at quarterback as the Knights entered the conference portion of their schedule. In their first intra-conference home game, the Knights jumped out to a 35–7 lead over Baylor, but blew a 28-point lead, and lost 36–35. The Knights suffered a five-game skid, slipping to 3–5. With Plumlee back to full strength in November, the Knights won three of their last four games to finish the regular season 6–6 overall (3–6 in the Big 12), and became bowl eligible for the eighth consecutive season. Of the four newcomers that joined the Big 12 for 2023 (BYU, Cincinnati, and Houston being the others), UCF finished with the best record, and was the only one bowl-eligible.

== Offseason ==
=== Transfers ===
==== Incoming ====
Player	Position	Previous school
Timmy McClain	QB	South Florida
Trent Whittemore	WR	Florida
Chauncey Magwood	WR	Kentucky
Drake Metcalf	IOL	Stanford
Gage King	LS	Arizona State
Fred Davis II	DB	Clemson
Amari Kight	OT	Alabama
Marcellus Marshall	OT	Kent State
DeJordan Mask	S	Texas State
Jireh Wilson	S	East Carolina
Bula Schmidt	IOL	Fresno State
Decorian Patterson	DB	Middle Tennessee State
Rian Davis	LB	Georgia
Xavier Williams	QB	Charlotte
Isaiah Paul	LB	Washington State
Shaun Peterson	DE	FIU
Derrick LeBlanc	DL	Oklahoma
Corey Gammage	WR	Marshall
Gunnar Smith	QB	South Florida
Kriston Esnard	PK	Tulane

==== Outgoing ====
Player	Position	Destination
Mikey Keene	QB	Fresno State
Jeremiah Jean-Baptiste	LB	Ole Miss
Davonte Brown	CB	Miami (FL)
Philjae Bien Aime	CB	North Alabama
Ryan O'Keefe	WR	Boston College
Terrence Lewis	LB	Hutchinson CC
Trevion Shadrick-Harris	CB	Eastern Washington
Jordan Johnson	WR	Iowa Western
Ah'Mare Lee	DB	Florida A&M
Joey Gatewood	WR	Louisville
Karlis Bailey-Vice	DE	NA
Anthony Williams	RB	Stephen F. Austin
Andrew Osteen	P	Mississippi State
Matt Lee	C	Miami (FL)
Miguel Maldonado	OL	UFTL
Tommy Castellanos	QB	Boston College
Ethan Mort	OL	NA
Keahnist Thompson	DL	Weber State
Justin Hodges	DB	Arkansas State
Branden Jennings	LB	Hinds CC
Quan Lee	WR	Florida A&M
Jaden Francois	DB	Utah State
Will Bohn	QB	Southeastern

== Preseason ==
=== Spring game ===
The 2023 UCF spring exhibition game was played on Friday April 14 at FBC Mortgage Stadium. The team was split into two squads for gameplay, the Knights and the 'Nauts.

Date	Time	Spring Game	Site	Result
April 14	6:30 pm	Knights vs. 'Nauts	FBC Mortgage Stadium • Orlando, FL	43-42 'Nauts

=== Award watch lists ===
A total of eight players were named to the preseason All-Big 12 mentions, and eight players were named to the Senior Bowl watchlist.

Award	Player	Position	Year
William V. Campbell Trophy	Jason Johnson	LB	Sr.
Polynesian Football Player of the Year Award	Lokahi Pauole	OG	Sr.
Manning Award	John Rhys Plumlee	QB	(redshirt) Sr.
Chuck Bednarik Award	Jason Johnson	LB	Sr.
Butkus Award	Jason Johnson	LB	Sr.
Doak Walker Award	RJ Harvey	RB	(redshirt) Sr.
Ray Guy Award	Mitch McCarthy	P	So.
Davey O'Brien Award	John Rhys Plumlee	QB	(redshirt) Sr.
Fred Biletnikoff Award	Corey Gammage	WR	(redshirt) Sr.
Lou Groza Award	Colton Boomer	K	So.
Bronko Nagurski Trophy	Jason Johnson	LB	Sr.
Outland Trophy	Lokahi Pauole	OG	Sr.
Maxwell Award	John Rhys Plumlee	QB	(redshirt) Sr.
Listed in the order that they were released

=== Big 12 preseason poll ===
The Big 12 preseason poll was released on July 6. UCF was voted 8th in the conference. First place votes in parentheses.

Big 12 media poll
Predicted finish	Team	Points
1	Texas (41)	886
2	Kansas State (14)	858
3	Oklahoma (4)	758
4	Texas Tech (4)	729
5	TCU (3)	727
6	Baylor	572
7	Oklahoma State (1)	470
8	UCF	463
9	Kansas	461
10	Iowa State	334
11	BYU	318
12	Houston	215
13	Cincinnati	202
14	West Virginia	129

== Schedule ==
The 2023 season is UCF's first as a member of the Big 12 Conference. The conference utilizes a nine-game conference schedule, with three out-of-conference games annually. Furthermore, the conference requires at least one of the three out-of-conference games to be against a Power Five opponent. UCF successfully petitioned for a first-year, one-time waiver to count their game at Boise State as their Power Five non-conference opponent, taking into account Boise State's recent successes and status as a top Group of Five team.

Date	Time	Opponent	Site	TV	Result	Attendance
August 31	7:00 p.m.	Kent State*	FBC Mortgage Stadium; Orlando, FL	FS1	W 56–6	44,088
September 9	7:00 p.m.	at Boise State*	Albertsons Stadium; Boise, ID	FS1	W 18–16	36,447
September 16	6:30 p.m.	No. 24 (FCS) Villanova*	FBC Mortgage Stadium; Orlando, FL	ESPN+	W 48–14	44,206
September 23	8:00 p.m.	at Kansas State	Bill Snyder Family Football Stadium; Manhattan, KS	FS1	L 31–44	51,912
September 30	3:30 p.m.	Baylor	FBC Mortgage Stadium; Orlando, FL	FS1	L 35–36	44,005
October 7	4:00 p.m.	at Kansas	David Booth Kansas Memorial Stadium; Lawrence, KS	FOX	L 22–51	46,107
October 21	12:00 p.m.	at No. 6 Oklahoma	Gaylord Family Oklahoma Memorial Stadium; Norman, OK	ABC	L 29–31	83,476
October 28	12:00 p.m.	West Virginia^{†}	FBC Mortgage Stadium; Orlando, FL	FS1 (Note: Partially aired on FOX as a look-in due to lightning delayed Oklahoma-Kansas game)	L 28–41	44,136
November 4	3:30 p.m.	at Cincinnati	Nippert Stadium; Cincinnati, OH (rivalry)	FS1	W 28–26	38,193
November 11	3:30 p.m.	No. 15 Oklahoma State	FBC Mortgage Stadium; Orlando, FL (Space Game)	ESPN	W 45−3	44,046
November 18	5:30 p.m.	at Texas Tech	Jones AT&T Stadium; Lubbock, TX	FS2	L 23−24	53,851
November 25	12:00 p.m.	Houston	FBC Mortgage Stadium; Orlando, FL	FS1	W 27–13	43,610
December 22	6:30 p.m.	vs. Georgia Tech*	Raymond James Stadium; Tampa, FL (Gasparilla Bowl)	ESPN	L 17–30	30,281
*Non-conference game; ^{†}Homecoming; Rankings from AP Poll (and CFP Rankings, after November 2) - Released prior to game; All times are in Eastern time

== Game summaries ==
=== Kent State ===
Kent State Golden Flashes at UCF Knights

Quarter	1	2	3	4	Total
Golden Flashes	3	0	3	0	6
Knights	14	14	14	14	56

at FBC Mortgage Stadium, Orlando, FL

- Date: August 31, 2023
- Game time: 7:00 p.m. EDT
- Game attendance: 44,088
- TV announcers (FS1): Eric Collins and Devin Gardner
- Gamecast

Game information

First Quarter

- UCF: Xavier Townsend 9-yard touchdown pass from John Rhys Plumlee (Colton Boomer kick), 10:56
- UCF: John Rhys Plumlee 17-yard touchdown run (Colton Boomer kick), 6:07
- Kent State: Andrew Glass 45-yard field goal, 3:20

Second Quarter

- UCF: Jordan McDonald 2-yard touchdown run (Colton Boomer kick), 8:46
- UCF: Alec Holler 18-yard touchdown pass from John Rhys Plumlee (Colton Boomer kick), 0:42

Third Quarter

- UCF: R.J. Harvey 50-yard touchdown pass from John Rhys Plumlee (Colton Boomer kick), 10:37
- UCF: R.J. Harvey 48-yard touchdown run (Colton Boomer kick), 4:07
- Kent State: Andrew Glass 43-yard field goal, 0:49

Fourth Quarter

- UCF: Mark-Antony Richards 7-yard touchdown run (Colton Boomer kick), 7:26
- UCF: Demarkcus Bowman 5-yard touchdown (Colton Boomer kick), 0:54

Win Probability

- UCF 90.4%

Line

- UCF -35.0

Over/Under

- 54

Statistics	KENT	UCF
First downs	15	32
Total yards	240	723
Rushing yards	95	389
Passing yards	145	334
Turnovers	1	3
Time of possession	28:34	31:26

Team	Category	Player	Statistics
Kent State	Passing	Michael Alaimo	12–31, 145 yards, 0 TD, 1 INT
Kent State	Rushing	Gavin Garcia	18 carries, 45 yards
Kent State	Receiving	Chrishon McCray	3 receptions, 61 yards
UCF	Passing	John Rhys Plumlee	22–30, 281 yards, 3 TD, 1 INT
UCF	Rushing	Johnny Richardson	12 carries, 100 yards
UCF	Receiving	Xavier Townsend	5 receptions, 81 yards, 1 TD

Quarterback John Rhys Plumlee threw for 281 yards and rushed for 90 yards as the Knights routed Kent State 56–6 on Thursday night. The game marked UCF's first football game as a member of the Big 12. The Knights won their 8th consecutive season opener.

=== at Boise State ===
UCF Knights at Boise State Broncos

Quarter	1	2	3	4	Total
Knights	3	6	0	9	18
Broncos	7	3	0	6	16

at Albertsons Stadium, Boise, ID

- Date: September 9, 2023
- Game time: 5:00 p.m. MDT / 7:00 p.m. EDT
- Game attendance: 36,447
- TV announcers (FS1): Eric Collins and Devin Gardner
- Gamecast

Game information

First Quarter

- UCF: Colton Boomer 50-yard field goal, 7:27
- Boise State: Ashton Jeanty 38-yard touchdown pass from Taylen Green (Jonah Dalmas kick), 4:20

Second Quarter

- UCF: Colton Boomer 33-yard field goal, 8:32
- Boise State: Jonah Dalmas 56-yard field goal, 3:14
- UCF: Colton Boomer 55-yard field goal, 1:01

Third Quarter

- No scoring plays

Fourth Quarter

- UCF: R.J. Harvey 5-yard touchdown run (pass failed), 7:55
- Boise State: Stefan Cobbs 28-yard touchdown pass from Taylen Green (pass failed), 1:49
- UCF: Colton Boomer 40-yard field goal, 0:00

Win Probability

- UCF 78.9%

Line

- UCF -3.0

Over/Under

- 58.5

Statistics	UCF	BSU
First downs	23	22
Total yards	530	384
Rushing yards	258	173
Passing yards	272	211
Turnovers	2	1
Time of possession	28:03	31:57

Team	Category	Player	Statistics
UCF	Passing	John Rhys Plumlee	16–24, 272 yards, 0 TD, 2 INT
UCF	Rushing	John Rhys Plumlee	11 carries, 73 yards
UCF	Receiving	Kobe Hudson	5 receptions, 134 yards
Boise State	Passing	Taylen Green	9–19, 144 yards, 1 TD, 1 INT
Boise State	Rushing	Ashton Jeanty	24 carries, 115 yards
Boise State	Receiving	Ashton Jeanty	5 receptions, 97 yards, 1 TD

Colton Boomer kicked a 40-yard game-winning field goal as time expired to lift the Knights over the Boise State Broncos by the score of 18–16. Boomer went 4-for-4 on field goals, including a school record-tying 55 yarder in the second quarter. Late in the game, quarterback John Rhys Plumlee suffered a leg injury which will require him to miss multiple weeks.

=== No. 24 (FCS) Villanova ===
No. 24 (FCS) Villanova Wildcats at UCF Knights

Quarter	1	2	3	4	Total
No. 24 (FCS) Wildcats	0	0	0	14	14
Knights	17	17	7	7	48

at FBC Mortgage Stadium, Orlando, FL

- Date: September 16, 2023
- Game time: 6:30 pm EDT
- Game attendance: 44,206
- TV announcers (ESPN+): Drew Fellios and Forrest Conoly
- Gamecast

Game information

First Quarter

- UCF: Colton Boomer 26-yard field goal, 9:21
- UCF: Jordan McDonald 1-yard touchdown run (Colton Boomer kick), 4:51
- UCF: Jordan McDonald 1-yard touchdown run (Colton Boomer kick), 1:01

Second Quarter

- UCF: R.J. Harvey 5-yard touchdown run (Colton Boomer kick), 7:47
- UCF: Javon Baker 25 Yd pass from Timmy McClain (Colton Boomer kick), 5:04
- UCF: Colton Boomer 41-yard field goal, 0:25

Third Quarter

- UCF: R.J. Harvey 24-yard touchdown run (Colton Boomer kick), 5:12

Fourth Quarter

- Villanova: Connor Watkins 3-yard touchdown run (Matthew Mercurio kick), 13:42
- UCF: Jaylon Griffin 36-yard touchdown pass from Timmy McClain (Colton Boomer kick), 11:22
- Villanova: T.D. Ayo-Durojaiye 11-yard touchdown run (Matthew Mercurio kick), 4:44

Win Probability

- UCF 95.9%

Line

- N/A

Over/Under

- N/A

Statistics	NOVA	UCF
First downs	11	31
Total yards	228	600
Rushing yards	84	251
Passing yards	144	349
Turnovers	1	0
Time of possession	27:08	32:52

Team	Category	Player	Statistics
Villanova	Passing	Connor Watkins	9-23, 144 yards, 1 INT
Villanova	Rushing	Deewil Barlee	7 carries, 39 yards
Villanova	Receiving	Jaylan Sanchez	1 receptions, 45 yards
UCF	Passing	Timmy McClain	20–28, 321 yards, 2 TD, 0 INT
UCF	Rushing	R. J. Harvey	14 carries, 85 yards, 2 TD
UCF	Receiving	Kobe Hudson	6 receptions, 147 yards

Timmy McClain started at quarterback for the injured John Rhys Plumlee. McClain threw for 321 yards, and the UCF offense racked up 600 total yards as the Knights soundly defeated FCS #24 Villanova by the score of 48–14.

=== at Kansas State ===
UCF Knights at Kansas State Wildcats

Quarter	1	2	3	4	Total
Knights	10	7	7	7	31
Wildcats	7	14	10	13	44

at Bill Snyder Family Stadium, Manhattan, KS

- Date: September 23, 2023
- Game time: 8:00 p.m. EDT
- Game attendance: 51,912
- TV announcers (FS1): Eric Collins and Devin Gardner
- Gamecast

Game information

First Quarter

- Kansas State: D.J. Gidden 1-yard touchdown run (Chris Tennant kick), 11:34
- UCF: Colton Boomer 29-yard field goal, 9:08
- UCF: R.J. Harvey 27-yard touchdown pass from Timmy McClain (Colton Boomer kick), 1:47

Second Quarter

- Kansas State: D.J. Gidden 9-yard touchdown run (Chris Tennant kick), 12:19
- Kansas State: D.J. Gidden 18-yard touchdown run (Chris Tennant kick), 6:20
- UCF: Kobe Hudson 69-yard touchdown pass from Timmy McClain (Colton Boomer Kick), 3:19

Third Quarter

- UCF: Kobe Hudson 46-yard touchdown pass from Timmy McClain (Colton Boomer kick), 13:40
- Kansas State: Chris Tennant 30-yard field goal, 9:33
- Kansas State: Will Howard 2-yard touchdown run (Chris Tennant kick), 1:28

Fourth Quarter

- Kansas State: D.J. Gidden 3-yard touchdown run (PAT failed), 4:01
- Kansas State: Will Howard 31-yard touchdown run (Chris Tennant kick), 2:01
- UCF: R.J. Harvey 1-yard touchdown run (Colton Boomer kick), 0:03

Win Probability

- Kansas State 57.9%

Line

- Kansas State -4.0

Over/Under

- 52.5

Statistics	UCF	KSU
First downs	19	32
Total yards	407	536
Rushing yards	143	255
Passing yards	264	255
Turnovers	2	1
Time of possession	25:37	34:23

Team	Category	Player	Statistics
UCF	Passing	Timmy McClain	14-24, 264 yards, 3 TD, 1 INT
UCF	Rushing	Johnny Richardson	6 carries, 76 yards
UCF	Receiving	Kobe Hudson	6 receptions, 138 yards, 2 TD
Kansas State	Passing	Will Howard	27-42, 255 yards, 1 INT
Kansas State	Rushing	D. J. Giddens	30 carries, 207 yards, 4 TD
Kansas State	Receiving	D. J. Giddens	8 receptions, 96 yards

UCF traveled to Kansas State for their first-ever intra-conference game in the Big 12. Timmy McClain once again started at quarterback, throwing for 264 yards and three touchdowns. The Knights defense, however, could not contain the Wildcats offense, and lost by the score of 44–31. D.J. Giddens rushed for 207 yards and 4 touchdowns, and caught 8 balls for another 86 yards. The game was tied 24–24 midway through the third quarter, but Kansas State put the game away with 20 unanswered points. Ten penalties for 80 yards on UCF, two turnovers in Wildcats territory, plus a lopsided time of possession were factors in the loss.

=== Baylor ===
Baylor Bears at UCF Knights

Quarter	1	2	3	4	Total
Bears	7	0	3	26	36
Knights	21	7	7	0	35

at FBC Mortgage Stadium, Orlando, FL

- Date: September 30, 2023
- Game time: 3:30 p.m. EDT
- Game weather: Cloudy • Temperature: 83 °F (28 °C)
- Game attendance: 44,005
- Referee: Henry Johns
- TV announcers (FS1): Eric Collins and Devin Gardner
- Gamecast

Game information

First Quarter

- UCF: Johnny Richardson 79-yard touchdown run (Colton Boomer kick), 13:13
- UCF: Timmy McClain 2-yard touchdown run (Colton Boomer kick), 9:09
- UCF: Javon Baker 65-yard touchdown pass from Timmy McClain (Colton Boomer kick), 6:17
- Baylor: Blake Shapen 2-yard touchdown run (Isaiah Hankins Kick), 2:03

Second Quarter

- UCF: Demari Henderson 87-yard fumble return touchdown (Colton Boomer kick), 11:12

Third Quarter

- UCF: Xavier Townsend 6-yard touchdown pass from Timmy McClain (Colton Boomer kick), 8:08
- Baylor: Isaiah Hankins 30-yard field goal, 3:20

Fourth Quarter

- Baylor: Dawson Pendergrass 6-yard touchdown run (Shapen pass to Ketron Jackson Jr.), 12:38
- Baylor: Monaray Baldwin 5-yard touchdown pass from Blake Shapen (Shapen pass to Jordan Nabors), 9:38
- Baylor: Caden Jenkins 72-yard fumble return touchdown (Isaiah Hankins kick), 6:02
- Baylor: Isaiah Hankins 25-yard field goal, 1:21

Win Probability

- UCF 88.1%

Line

- UCF -8

Over/Under

- 56.5

Statistics	BU	UCF
First downs	22	18
Total yards	446	469
Rushing yards	153	235
Passing yards	293	234
Turnovers	1	2
Time of possession	35:31	24:29

Team	Category	Player	Statistics
Baylor	Passing	Blake Shapen	21-34, 293 yards, 1 INT
Baylor	Rushing	Richard Reese	16 carries, 100 yards
Baylor	Receiving	Monaray Baldwin	7 receptions, 150 yards, 1 TD
UCF	Passing	Timmy McClain	13-25, 234 yards, 2 TD, 1 INT
UCF	Rushing	Johnny Richardson	6 carries, 105 yards, 1 TD
UCF	Receiving	Javon Baker	3 receptions, 113 yards, 1 TD

UCF hosted Baylor for their first intra-conference home game in the Big 12. The game was a rematch of the 2014 Fiesta Bowl. The Knights blew a 35–7 lead. Baylor scored a go-ahead field goal with 1:21 remaining and won 36–35. On the first play from scrimmage, Johnny Richardson broke free for a 79-yard touchdown run, and after two more quick scores, UCF jumped out to an early 21–0 lead. The Knights eventually built a 35–7 lead, which they held late in the third quarter. Baylor scored 29 unanswered points, including two touchdown passes from Blake Shapen, and a 72-yard fumble return for a touchdown. UCF got the ball back one last time with 1:21 remaining. Colton Boomer's 59-yard field goal attempt fell no good as time expired, and Baylor escaped with the victory.

=== at Kansas ===
UCF Knights at Kansas Jayhawks

Quarter	1	2	3	4	Total
Knights	0	0	8	14	22
Jayhawks	3	21	13	14	51

at David Booth Kansas Memorial Stadium, Lawrence, KS

- Date: October 7, 2023
- Game time: 4:00 p.m.
- Game weather: Sunny • Temperature: 64 °F (18 °C)
- Game attendance: 46,107
- Referee: Tutashinda Salaam
- TV announcers (Fox): Jason Benetti, Brock Huard, and Allison Williams
- Gamecast

Game information

First Quarter

- Kansas: Seth Keller 25-yard field goal, 3:42

Second Quarter

- Kansas: Lawrence Arnold 5-yard touchdown pass from Jason Bean (Seth Keller Kick), 13:43
- Kansas: Daniel Hishaw Jr. 3-yard touchdown run (Seth Keller Kick), 6:31
- Kansas: Trevor Wilson 82-yard punt return touchdown (Seth Keller Kick), 3:26

Third Quarter

- Kansas: Devin Neal 75-yard touchdown run (Seth Keller Kick), 14:48
- UCF: Alec Holler 13-yard touchdown pass from Timmy McClain (pass failed), 13:01
- Kansas: Dylan McDuffie 1-yard touchdown run, 7:02
- UCF: Demari Henderson Defensive PAT Conversion, 7:02

Fourth Quarter

- UCF: R.J. Harvey 4-yard touchdown run (Colton Boomer Kick), 13:55
- Kansas: Daniel Hishaw Jr. 7-yard touchdown run (Seth Keller Kick), 11:47
- UCF: Randy Pittman 23-yard touchdown pass from Timmy McClain (Colton Boomer Kick), 10:09
- Kansas: Dylan McDuffie 1-yard touchdown run (Owen Piepergerdes Kick), 0:53

Win Probability

- UCF 60.6%

Line

- Kansas -2.0

Over/Under

- 65

Statistics	UCF	KU
First downs	21	25
Total yards	371	490
Rushing yards	202	399
Passing yards	169	91
Turnovers	1	0
Time of possession	25:35	34:25

Team	Category	Player	Statistics
UCF	Passing	Timmy McClain	12-15, 136 yards, 2 TD
UCF	Rushing	R. J. Harvey	16 carries, 133 yards, 1 TD
UCF	Receiving	Javon Baker	4 receptions, 85 yards
Kansas	Passing	Jason Bean	8-12, 91 yards, 1 TD
Kansas	Rushing	Devin Neal	12 carries, 154 yards, 1 TD
Kansas	Receiving	Luke Grimm	2 receptions, 41 yards

John Rhys Plumlee returned to start at quarterback, but played for only three drives in the first half. Timmy McClain took over and played the rest of the game. Kansas dominated UCF, jumping out to a 31–0 lead, and pulling away for a 51–22 victory. The Jayhawks put up 399 yards rushing, while UCF was held to a season-low 371 total yards.

=== at No. 6 Oklahoma ===
UCF Knights at No. 5 Oklahoma Sooners

Quarter	1	2	3	4	Total
Knights	0	17	6	6	29
No. 6 Sooners	7	10	0	14	31

at Gaylord Family Oklahoma Memorial Stadium, Norman, OK

- Date: October 21, 2023
- Game time: 12:00 p.m.
- Game weather: Sunny • Temperature: 72 °F (22 °C)
- Game attendance: 83,476
- Referee: Derek Anderson
- TV announcers (ABC): Dave Pasch (play-by-play), Dusty Dvoracek (analyst) & Tom Luginbill (sideline)
- Gamecast

Game information

First Quarter

- Oklahoma: Nic Anderson 29-yard touchdown pass from Dillon Gabriel (Zach Schmit Kick), 7:48

Second Quarter

- UCF: John Rhys Plumlee 1-yard touchdown run (Colton Boomer Kick), 11:49
- UCF: Colton Boomer 21-yard field goal, 4:01
- Oklahoma: Nic Anderson 42-yard touchdown pass from Dillon Gabriel (Zach Schmit Kick), 1:51
- UCF: Javon Baker 86-yard touchdown pass from John Rhys Plumlee (Colton Boomer Kick), 1:24
- Oklahoma: Zach Schmit 25-yard field goal, 0:00

Third Quarter

- UCF: Colton Boomer 48-yard field goal, 11:51
- UCF: Colton Boomer 46-yard field goal, 5:28

Fourth Quarter

- Oklahoma: Drake Stoops 11-yard touchdown pass from Dillon Gabriel (Zach Schmit Kick), 9:16
- Oklahoma: Gavin Sawchuk 30-yard touchdown run (Zach Schmit Kick), 3:13
- UCF: Javon Baker 12-yard touchdown pass John Rhys Plumlee (Two-point conversion failed), 1:16

Win Probability

- Oklahoma 93.9%

Line

- Oklahoma -17

Over/Under

- 67.5

Statistics	UCF	OKLA
First downs	20	30
Total yards	397	442
Rushing yards	149	189
Passing yards	248	253
Turnovers	0	1
Time of possession	30:16	29:44

Team	Category	Player	Statistics
UCF	Passing	John Rhys Plumlee	16–30, 248 yards, 2 TD
UCF	Rushing	R. J. Harvey	23 carries, 101 yards
UCF	Receiving	Javon Baker	5 receptions, 134 yards, 2 TD
Oklahoma	Passing	Dillon Gabriel	25–38, 253 yards, 3 TD, 1 INT
Oklahoma	Rushing	Marcus Major	18 carries, 82 yards
Oklahoma	Receiving	Nic Anderson	5 receptions, 105 yards, 2 TD

UCF traveled to Norman to take on Oklahoma. Facing former quarterback Dillon Gabriel, the Knights nearly upset the No. 6 ranked Sooners. UCF led 23–17 after three quarters, before Oklahoma scored two fourth quarter touchdowns to take a 31–23 lead. John Rhys Plumlee, back in the starting lineup, drove the Knights 75 yards in 9 plays. On 4th & 10 at the Oklahoma 12, Plumee found Javon Baker for a 12-yard touchdown pass, trimming the deficit to 31–29 with 1:16 left in regulation. UCF's two-point conversion attempt was snuffed out, and the Sooners held on for the victory.

=== West Virginia ===
West Virginia Mountaineers at UCF Knights

Quarter	1	2	3	4	Total
Mountaineers	10	7	7	17	41
Knights	7	7	7	7	28

at FBC Mortgage Stadium, Orlando, FL

- Date: October 28, 2023
- Game time: 12:00 p.m.
- Game attendance: 44,136
- TV announcers (FS1/FOX): Eric Collins, Devin Gardner
- Gamecast

Game information

First Quarter

- WVU: Garrett Greene 6-yard touchdown run (Michael Hayes kick), 10:57
- UCF: Kobe Hudson 34-yard touchdown pass from John Rhys Plumlee (Colton Boomer kick), 7:06
- WVU: Michael Hayes 24-yard field goal, 2:01

Second Quarter

- WVU: Jahiem White 4-yard touchdown run (Michael Hayes kick), 10:02
- UCF: John Rhys Plumlee 8-yard touchdown run (Colton Boomer kick), 5:50

Third Quarter

- WVU: Garrett Greene 7-yard touchdown run (Michael Hayes kick), 9:01
- UCF: Javon Baker 7-yard touchdown from John Rhys Plumlee (Colton Boomer kick), 5:25

Fourth Quarter

- WVU: Garrett Greene 1-yard touchdown run (Michael Hayes kick), 14:12
- WVU: C.J. Donaldson 1-yard touchdown run (Michael Hayes kick), 9:25
- WVU: Michael Hayes 41-yard field goal, 5:15
- UCF: Kobe Hudson 16-yard touchdown pass from John Rhys Plumlee (Colton Boomer kick), 1:46

Win Probability

- UCF 70.7%

Line

- UCF -7

Over/Under

- 57.5

Statistics	WVU	UCF
First downs	25	27
Total yards	450	463
Rushing yards	286	189
Passing yards	164	274
Turnovers	1	4
Time of possession	36:06	23:54

Team	Category	Player	Statistics
West Virginia	Passing	Garrett Greene	14-23, 156 yards
West Virginia	Rushing	C.J. Donaldson	17 carries, 121 yards, 1 TD
West Virginia	Receiving	Devin Carter	3 receptions, 47 yards
UCF	Passing	John Rhys Plumlee	25–36, 274 yards, 3 TD, 3 INT
UCF	Rushing	RJ Harvey	14 carries, 100 yards
UCF	Receiving	Kobe Hudson	3 receptions, 66 yards, 2 TD

UCF hosted West Virginia on Homecoming. Quarterback John Rhys Plumlee threw three interceptions and lost a fumble, as the Mountaineers won 41–28. West Virginia put up 286 yards rushing, and quarterback Garrett Greene ran for three touchdowns.

=== at Cincinnati ===
UCF Knights at Cincinnati Bearcats

Quarter	1	2	3	4	Total
Knights	7	7	7	7	28
Bearcats	3	7	7	9	26

at Nippert Stadium, Cincinnati, OH

- Date: November 4, 2023
- Game time: 3:30 p.m.
- Game attendance: 38,193
- TV announcers (FS1): Adam Alexander, Devin Gardner
- Gamecast

Game information

First Quarter

- Cincinnati: Carter Brown 39-yard field goal, 9:58
- UCF: John Rhys Plumlee 8-yard touchdown run (Colton Boomer Kick), 0:20

Second Quarter

- UCF: R. J. Harvey 13-yard touchdown run (Colton Boomer Kick), 4:12
- Cincinnati: Braden Smith 11-yard touchdown pass from Emory Jones (Carter Brown Kick), 1:56

Third Quarter

- Cincinnati: Ryan Montgomery 2-yard touchdown run (Carter Brown Kick), 5:19
- UCF: R. J. Harvey 25-yard touchdown run (Colton Boomer Kick), 0:31

Fourth Quarter

- Cincinnati: Carter Brown 28-yard field goal, 6:21
- UCF: R. J. Harvey 1-yard touchdown run (Colton Boomer Kick), 2:41
- Cincinnati: Corey Kiner 6-yard touchdown run (pass failed), 1:27

Win Probability

- UCF 56.2%

Line

- UCF -3.5

Over/Under

- 60.5

Statistics	UCF	CIN
First downs	23	23
Total yards	393	515
Rushing yards	228	248
Passing yards	165	267
Turnovers	0	2
Time of possession	27:03	32:57

Team	Category	Player	Statistics
UCF	Passing	John Rhys Plumlee	13–23, 165 yards
UCF	Rushing	R. J. Harvey	20 carries, 164 yards, 3 TD
UCF	Receiving	Javon Baker	4 receptions, 93 yards
Cincinnati	Passing	Emory Jones	16–22, 217 yards, 1 TD, 1 INT
Cincinnati	Rushing	Corey Kiner	19 carries, 114 yards, 1 TD
Cincinnati	Receiving	Braden Smith	6 receptions, 114 yards, 1 TD

UCF traveled to rival Cincinnati, and won their first conference game in Big 12 conference play. Running back R. J. Harvey had a career-best 164 yards rushing and three touchdowns. Harvey scored a 1-yard touchdown run to put the Knights up 28–20 with 2:41 left in regulation. Emory Jones then drove the Bearcats 75 yards in five plays for a touchdown, making the score 28–26 with 1:27 left. Jones' two-point conversion pass was tipped and fell incomplete, and the Knights held on to win 28–26.

=== No. 15 Oklahoma State ===
Oklahoma State Cowboys at UCF Knights

Quarter	1	2	3	4	Total
No. 15 Cowboys	0	0	3	0	3
Knights	14	10	14	7	45

at FBC Mortgage Stadium, Orlando, FL

- Date: November 11, 2023
- Game time: 3:30 p.m.
- Game attendance: 44,046
- TV announcers (ESPN): Mike Monaco, Robert Griffin III
- Gamecast

Game information

First Quarter

- UCF: R. J. Harvey 1-yard touchdown run (Colton Boomer kick), 11:50
- UCF: Kobe Hudson 7-yard touchdown pass from John Rhys Plumlee (Colton Boomer kick), 9:08

Second Quarter

- UCF: Colton Boomer 30-yard field goal, 14:04
- UCF: Kobe Hudson 75-yard touchdown pass from John Rhys Plumlee (Colton Boomer kick), 10:35

Third Quarter

- OSU: Alex Hale 25-yard field goal, 10:00
- UCF: R. J. Harvey 92-yard touchdown run (Colton Boomer kick), 8:56
- UCF: Kobe Hudson 14-yard touchdown pass from John Rhys Plumlee (Colton Boomer kick), 4:09

Fourth Quarter

- UCF: R. J. Harvey 2-yard touchdown run (Colton Boomer kick), 9:00

Win Probability

- UCF 64.0

Line

- OSU -2.5

Over/Under

- 63.5

Statistics	OSU	UCF
First downs	15	21
Total yards	277	592
Rushing yards	52	293
Passing yards	225	299
Turnovers	4	1
Time of possession	25:15	34:45

Team	Category	Player	Statistics
Oklahoma State	Passing	Alan Bowman	19–36, 225 yards, 3 INT
Oklahoma State	Rushing	Ollie Gordon II	12 carries, 25 yards
Oklahoma State	Receiving	Rashod Owens	6 receptions, 85 yards
UCF	Passing	John Rhys Plumlee	11–18, 299 yards, 3 TD
UCF	Rushing	R. J. Harvey	24 carries, 206 yards, 3 TD
UCF	Receiving	Javon Baker	4 receptions, 112 yards

UCF hosted then-No. 15 Oklahoma State in their seventh annual "Space Game". The Knights dominated the game from start to finish, and routed the Cowboys 45–3. John Rhys Plumlee threw for 299 yards and three touchdown passes, while R.J. Harvey rushed for a career-best 206 yards and three touchdowns on the ground. The UCF defense held Cowboys running back Ollie Gordon II (the nation's leading rusher) to only 25 yards, and forced four turnovers. The Knights won their first Big 12 intra-conference home game, and first Big 12 intra-conference game against an existing/original team from the conference. After the game, fans stormed the field to celebrate.

UCF jumped out to a quick 14–0 lead in the first quarter. R.J. Harvey got the Knights on the board with a 1-yard touchdown run on their first drive. Ollie Gordon then fumbled in Knights territory, which led to a 7-yard touchdown pass from John Rhys Plumlee to Kobe Hudson. Braeden Marshall picked off Alan Bowman's deflected pass, which led to a Knights field goal early in the second quarter. A huge downpour then pelted the stadium, but it did not slow down the Knights offense. Plumlee found Kobe Hudson for a 75-yard touchdown, and the Knights led 24–0 at halftime.

Oklahoma State got the ball to start the third quarter. The Cowboys drove to the Knights 7 yard line, but had to settle for a field goal. On the ensuing drive, Plumlee was sacked and fumbled, giving the Cowboys the ball at the UCF 24. Two plays later, however, Demari Henderson tipped and intercepted a pass by Bowman at the 8 yard line. It was Bowman's third interception of the game, and Henderson's second such of the game defensively. On the very next play from scrimmage, R.J. Harvey took a handoff and blasted through for a 92-yard touchdown run to put the Knights up 31–3. UCF would tack on two more scores, and defeated Oklahoma State by the final score of 45–3.

=== at Texas Tech ===
UCF Knights at Texas Tech Red Raiders

Quarter	1	2	3	4	Total
Knights	14	0	0	9	23
Red Raiders	0	14	7	3	24

at Jones AT&T Stadium, Lubbock, TX

- Date: November 18, 2023
- Game time: 5:30 p.m.
- Game weather: Sunny
- Game attendance: 53,851
- Referee: Tutashinda Salaam
- TV announcers (FS2): Guy Haberman, Charles Arbuckle
- Gamecast

Game information

First Quarter

- UCF: R.J. Harvey 4-yard touchdown run (Colton Boomer kick), 11:49
- UCF: R.J. Harvey 1-yard touchdown run (Colton Boomer kick), 0:11

Second Quarter

- TTU: Drae McCray 15-yard touchdown pass from Behren Morton (Gino Garcia kick), 13:10
- TTU: Mason Tharp 19-yard touchdown pass from Behren Morton (Gino Garcia kick), 3:13

Third Quarter

- TTU: Tahj Brooks 13-yard touchdown run (Gino Garcia kick), 0:11

Fourth Quarter

- UCF: Colton Boomer 24-yard field goal, 10:21
- TTU: Gino Garcia 51-yard field goal, 6:13
- UCF: Javon Baker 71-yard touchdown pass from John Rhys Plumlee (PAT blocked), 5:30

Win Probability

- TTU 54.6%

Line

- TTU -2.5

Over/Under

- 60.5

Statistics	UCF	TTU
First downs	23	25
Total yards	486	446
Rushing yards	238	190
Passing yards	248	256
Turnovers	1	1
Time of possession	31:57	28:03

Team	Category	Player	Statistics
UCF	Passing	John Rhys Plumlee	16–32, 248 yards, 1 TD, 1 INT
UCF	Rushing	John Rhys Plumlee	13 carries, 84 yards
UCF	Receiving	Javon Baker	4 receptions, 117 yards, 1 TD
Texas Tech	Passing	Behren Morton	21–35, 256 yards, 2 TD, 1 INT
Texas Tech	Rushing	Tahj Brooks	24 carries, 182 yards, 1 TD
Texas Tech	Receiving	Xavier White	3 receptions, 77 yards

UCF traveled to take on Texas Tech. The Knights jumped out to a 14–0 lead in the first quarter, with two touchdown runs by R. J. Harvey. With 5:30 left in the fourth quarter, UCF was trailing 24–17. John Rhys Plumlee found Javon Baker wide open for a 71-yard touchdown pass. But Colton Boomer's game-tying extra point attempt was blocked and sailed wide left. The Red Raiders were able to run out the clock and held on for a 24–23 victory.

=== Houston ===
Houston Cougars at UCF Knights

Quarter	1	2	3	4	Total
Cougars	10	0	0	3	13
Knights	6	7	14	0	27

at FBC Mortgage Stadium, Orlando, FL

- Date: November 25, 2023
- Game time: 12:00 p.m.
- Game attendance: 43,610
- TV announcers (FS1): Eric Collins, Devin Gardner
- Gamecast

Game information

First Quarter

- Houston: Stephon Johnson 16-yard touchdown pass from Donovan Smith (Jack Martin kick), 10:34
- UCF: John Rhys Plumlee 8-yard touchdown run (kick failed), 5:31
- Houston: Jack Martin 32-yard field goal, 1:56

Second Quarter

- UCF: Xavier Townsend 28-yard touchdown pass from John Rhys Plumlee (Colton Boomer kick), 12:58

Third Quarter

- UCF: R.J. Harvey 21-yard touchdown run (Colton Boomer kick), 14:07
- UCF: R.J. Harvey 2-yard touchdown run (Colton Boomer kick), 9:04

Fourth Quarter

- Houston: Jack Martin 34-yard field goal, 10:08

Win Probability

- UCF 77.9%

Line

- UCF -15.5

Over/Under

- 61.5

Statistics	HOU	UCF
First downs	17	23
Total yards	259	476
Rushing yards	94	223
Passing yards	165	253
Turnovers	1	0
Time of possession	27:04	32:56

Team	Category	Player	Statistics
Houston	Passing	Donovan Smith	12–20, 161 yards, 1 TD, I INT
Houston	Rushing	Stacy Sneed	3 carries, 33 yards
Houston	Receiving	Joseph Manjack IV	4 receptions, 74 yards
UCF	Passing	John Rhys Plumlee	23–27, 253 yards, 1 TD
UCF	Rushing	R. J. Harvey	21 carries, 136 yards, 2 TD
UCF	Receiving	Kobe Hudson	9 receptions, 98 yards

UCF hosted Houston in their regular season finale. Quarterback John Rhys Plumlee threw for 253 yards and running back R. J. Harvey rushed for 136 yards and two touchdowns, as the Knights defeated the Cougars 27–13. With the win, UCF finished the regular season 6–6 overall (3–6 in the Big 12), and became bowl eligible for the eighth consecutive season. The UCF offense put up 476 total yards, but the kicking game struggled for the second week in a row. Colton Boomer missed two field goals and an extra point.

=== Gasparilla Bowl ===
2023 Union Home Mortgage Gasparilla Bowl

Quarter	1	2	3	4	Total
Georgia Tech	0	17	3	10	30
UCF	14	3	0	0	17

at Raymond James Stadium, Tampa, Florida

- Date: Friday, December 22, 2023
- Game time: 6:30 p.m. EST
- Game weather: Clear • Temperature: 66 °F (19 °C) • Wind: 6 mph (9.7 km/h) NE
- Game attendance: 30,281
- Referee: Cravonne Barrett
- TV announcers (ESPN): Wes Durham (play-by-play), Tim Hasselbeck (analyst), and Taylor Tannebaum (sideline)
- Box score

Game information

First Quarter

- UCF: Javon Baker 23-yard touchdown pass from John Rhys Plumlee (Colton Boomer Kick), 13:37
- UCF: Kobe Hudson 17-yard touchdown pass from John Rhys Plumlee (Colton Boomer Kick), 6:26

Second Quarter

- GT: Aidan Birr 36-yard field goal, 14:17
- UCF: Colton Boomer 27-yard field goal, 8:23
- GT: Haynes King 5-yard touchdown run (Aidan Birr Kick), 4:23
- GT: Malik Rutherford 41-yard touchdown pass from Haynes King (Aidan Birr Kick), 0:56

Third Quarter

- GT: Aidan Birr 29-yard field goal, 12:07

Fourth Quarter

- GT: Dontae Smith 1-yard touchdown run (Aidan Birr Kick), 13:37
- GT: Aidan Birr 38-yard field goal, 4:52

Win Probability

- UCF 66.6%

Line

- UCF -4.5

Over/Under

- 64.5

Statistics	GT	UCF
First downs	21	19
Plays–yards	69–371	69–424
Rushes–yards	53–284	34–169
Passing yards	87	255
Passing: comp–att–int	7–13–1	17–33–1
Turnovers		
Time of possession	33:30	26:30

Team	Category	Player	Statistics
Georgia Tech	Passing	Haynes King	7/13, 87 yards, 1 TD, 1 INT
Georgia Tech	Rushing	Jamal Haynes	18 carries, 128 yards
Georgia Tech	Receiving	Malik Rutherford	2 receptions, 40 yards, 1 TD
UCF	Passing	John Rhys Plumlee	16/29, 198 yards, 2 TD
UCF	Rushing	R. J. Harvey	15 carries, 120 yards
UCF	Receiving	Javon Baker	9 receptions, 173 yards, 1 TD

UCF faced Georgia Tech in the 2023 Gasparilla Bowl. It was the sixth meeting between the two teams. UCF had won the most recent meeting 27–10 in 2022. This was UCF's sixth appearance in the Gasparilla Bowl (formerly known as the St. Petersburg Bowl). George O'Leary, formerly the head coach of both teams, took part in the pre-game coin toss.

The Knights jumped out to a 14–0 lead in the first quarter. John Rhys Plumlee threw touchdown passes to Javon Baker and Kobe Hudson. UCF was looking to go up 21–0 when their drive was snuffed out as R.J. Harvey fumbled away the ball at the Georgia Tech 42. The turnover led to a Yellow Jackets field goal, and was a turning point in the game. The Knights defense held Georgia Tech to only 87 yards passing, but the Yellow Jackets put up 284 yards on the ground. Trailing 17–3, Georgia Tech scored 27 unanswered points, and won by the score of 30–17.

== Personnel ==
2023 UCF Knights Football
Quarterbacks: 8 Xavier Williams – (redshirt) So.; 9 Timmy McClain – (redshirt) So.; 10 John Rhys Plumlee – Sr. (C); 12 Dylan Rizk – Fr.; 14 Gunnar Smith – (redshirt) Fr.; 21 Brock Hansel – (redshirt) Fr.; Running backs: 0 Johnny Richardson – Sr.; 5 Jordan McDonald – So.; 6 Mark-Antony Richards – (redshirt) Sr.; 7 R.J. Harvey – (redshirt) Sr.; 20 Kam Ingram – (redshirt) So.; 23 Demarkcus Bowman – (redshirt) Jr.; 37 Preston Foreman – (redshirt) Fr.; Wide receivers: 1 Javon Baker – Sr.; 2 Kobe Hudson – Sr.; 3 Xavier Townsend – So.; 4 Corey Gammage – (redshirt) Sr.; 11 Chauncey Magwood – Jr.; 15 Tyree Patterson – Fr.; 16 Stephen Martin – (redshirt) Jr.; 17 Amari Johnson – Sr.; 18 Jaylon Griffin – (redshirt) Sr.; 19 Jarrad Baker – (redshirt) Sr.; 24 Andrew Dickson – (redshirt) So.; 31 JaJuan Forte – (redshirt) 5th-Sr.; 38 Dionte Marks – (redshirt) Sr.; 80 Trent Whittemore – (redshirt) Jr.; 81 Tyler Griffin – (redshirt) Fr.; 87 Dwartney Wortham – (redshirt) Fr.; 89 Cullen Smith – (redshirt) So.; Tight ends/H-back: 13 Randy Pittman – Fr.; 41 Jack Morgan – So.; 49 Max Holler – (redshirt) Jr.; 82 Alec Holler – (redshirt) 5th-Sr. (C); 83 Garrett French – (redshirt) Jr.; 84 Thomas Wadsworth – (redshirt) Fr.; 85 Zach Marsh Wojan – (redshirt) 5th-Sr.; 86 Jordan Davis – (redshirt) Jr.; 88 Grant Stevens – (redshirt) Fr.	Offensive Lineman: 50 Patrick Barnett – (redshirt) Jr.; 52 Caden Kitler – (redshirt) Fr.; 54 Bula Schmidt – (redshirt) Sr.; 55 Cameron Kinnie – (redshirt) Jr.; 56 Johnathan Cline – Fr.; 57 John Harris – (redshirt) Sr.; 59 Keyon Cox – Fr.; 60 Drake Metcalf – (redshirt) Jr.; 64 Shaheem Hill – (redshirt) Fr.; 66 Chidoziri Maghiro – (redshirt) 5th-Sr.; 68 Ethan Higgins – Fr.; 69 Paul Rubelt – (redshirt) Jr.; 70 Edward Collins – (redshirt) 5th-Sr.; 71 Tylan Grable – (redshirt) 5th-Sr.; 72 Marcellus Marshall – Jr.; 74 Matthew Prigmore – Fr.; 75 Andrew Phelan – Fr.; 76 Adrian Medley – (redshirt) Sr.; 77 Lokahi Pauole – 5th-Sr. (C); 78 Amari Kight – (redshirt) Sr.; Kickers/Punters: 32 Michael Carter – (redshirt) Fr.; 35 Colton Boomer – So.; 40 Mitch McCarthy – So.; 98 Kriston Esnard – (redshirt) So.; 80 Grant Reddick – Fr.; Long snappers: 26 Chris Bowerfind – (redshirt) So.; 42 Aidan Fedigan – So.; 41 Gage King – (redshirt) Sr.	Defensive tackles: 2 Lee Hunter – (redshirt) So.; 5 Ricky Barber – (redshirt) Sr. (C); 40 Kervins Choute – (redshirt) Jr.; 55 John Walker – Fr.; 56 Matthew Alexander – (redshirt) So.; 87 Andrew Rumph – Fr.; 90 Derrick LeBlanc – Fr.; 91 Keshaun Hudson – So.; 94 Chris Ficka – Fr.; Linebacker: 0 Jason Johnson – (redshirt) 5th-Sr (C); 16 T.J. Bullard – (redshirt) Fr.; 15 Isaiah Paul – (redshirt) Sr.; 17 Rian Davis – (redshirt) Sr.; 20 Troy Ford Jr. – Fr.; 25 Camden Vining – (redshirt) So.; 27 Walter Yates III – (redshirt) 5th-Sr.; 28 Andrew Harris – Fr.; 30 Kam Moore – So.; 35 Keenan Cupit – (redshirt) Jr.; 43 Kingston Gorney – (redshirt) Sr.; 45 Quentin Hatch – So.; 54 Keeron Henderson – Sr.; Defensive back: 3 Ja'Cari Henderson – (redshirt) Fr.; 4 Braeden Marshall – Fr.; 7 Fred Davis II – Sr.; 8 Demari Henderson – So.; 9 Jireh Wilson – 5th-Sr.; 10 Quadric Bullard – Sr.; 11 Decorian Patterson – (redshirt) Sr.; 13 DeJordan Mask – 5th-Sr.; 14 Corey Thornton – Sr.; 18 Ja'Maric Morris – (redshirt) Sr.; 19 Hudson Gibbs – Fr.; 21 Nikai Martinez – So.; 22 Jason Duclona – Fr.; 24 Jarvis Ware – (redshirt) Sr.; 26 Daniel McCullon – (redshirt) Jr.; 29 William Wells – Jr.; 31 Brandon Adams – Jr.; 34 Terrell Jackson – So.; 36 Champ Jenkins – (redshirt) So.; 39 R.D. Cooper – Sr.; 46 Nicholas Antoine– (redshirt) Fr.	Defensive ends: 3 Tre'Mon Morris-Brash – 5th-Sr.; 6 Isaiah Nixon – Fr.; 33 Kaven Call – Fr.; 47 K.D. McDaniel – (redshirt) Sr.; 51 Malachi Lawrence – (redshirt) So.; 12 Shaun Peterson Jr. – (redshirt) Sr.; 58 Dallaz Corbitt – (redshirt) Sr.; 88 Josh Celiscar – Sr. (C); 96 Trace O'Hara – (redshirt) Jr.; 92 Finau Fine – (redshirt) Jr.; 99 Jamaal Johnson – (redshirt) Fr.; Legend: (C) Team captain; (S) Suspended; (I) Ineligible; Injured; Redshirt; Coaching staff: Gus Malzahn – Head Coach; Darin Hinshaw – Offensive coordinator/quarterbacks; Addison Williams – Defensive coordinator/Defensive Backs; David Gibbs – Co-Defensive coordinator/secondary; Herb Hand – Co-Offensive coordinator/Offensive line; Brian Blackmon – Special teams coordinator/Tight Ends; Ernie Sims – Linebacker; Kenny Ingram – Defensive Ends/Rush; Kenny Martin – Defensive Tackles; Grant Heard – Wide receivers; Kam Martin – Running backs; Will Healy – Assistant Head Coach/Senior Offensive Analyst; Bobby Bentley – Analyst; Andrew Blaylock – Special Assistant to Head Coach; Nate Craig-Myers – Recruiting/Offensive Assistant; Ben Larson – Special Teams Analyst; Charles Moore – Defensive Analyst; Brendan Bognar – Offensive Analyst; Cory Giddings – Director of Player Personnel; Deshon Lawrence – Director of Player Development; Alex Mathis – Asst. Director of Player Personnel/High School Relations; Chris Dawson – Director of Sports Performance; Andrew Shirek – Asst. Dir. of Sports Performance; Corey Meredith – Asst. Dir. of Sports Performance; Sean Beckton Jr. – Asst. Dir. of Sports Performance; CJ Holden – Dir. of FB Operations; → Roster updated September, 2023 → Depth chart updated September, 2023

== Awards and milestones ==
=== National honors ===
- FWAA Cheez-It National Team of the Week: (Week 11)
- Dodd Trophy Coach of the Week (Week 11): Gus Malzahn
- Manning Award Star of the Week — John Rhys Plumlee (Week 11)
- On3 True Freshman All-American: John Walker

=== All-Americans ===
All-American Honors
Player	Athletic	Athlon	BR	CBS Sports	CFN	ESPN	FOX Sports	Phil Steele	SI	USA Today
Javon Baker								HM		
RJ Harvey								HM		
Tre'Mon Morris-Brash								HM		
HM = Honorable mention.

=== All-Big 12 Conference ===
Big 12 All-Conference Honors
Player	Big 12	AP	Athlon	CFN	PFF	Phil Steele	USA Today
Javon Baker	1st	2nd	1st	1st	S	1st	
Colton Boomer	HM						
Tylan Grable	HM			HM			
Demari Henderson	HM						
RJ Harvey	HM		2nd	1st		2nd	
Kobe Hudson	HM		2nd	2nd		2nd	
Lee Hunter	HM			3rd		2nd	
Jason Johnson	2nd	2nd	2nd	2nd		1st	
Malachi Lawrence	HM						
Nikai Martinez				HM			
Marcellus Marshall				2nd			
Tre'Mon Morris-Brash	1st	1st	1st	1st		1st	
Lokahi Pauole	HM					2nd	S
John Rhys Plumlee	HM						
Corey Thornton	HM			HM			
Xavier Townsend	HM			HM		3rd	
Walter Yates III				HM			
HM = Honorable mention. S = Selected, indicating they were selected for a singular "best of" All-Big 12 team.

=== Big 12 Conference honors ===
- Special Teams Player of the Week (Week 2): Colton Boomer
- Co-Offense Player of the Week (Week 10): R. J. Harvey
- Defensive Player of the Week (Week 11): Demari Henderson
- Tre'Mon Morris-Brash (Defensive Lineman of the Year - Honorable Mention)
- Randy Pittman Jr. (Offensive Freshman of the Year - Honorable Mention)
- John Walker (Defensive Freshman of the Year - Honorable Mention)

=== School records ===
- Longest field goal (ties school record): 55 yards, Colton Boomer (at Boise State), September 9, 2023
