= Gus Malzahn =

American football player and coach (born 1965)

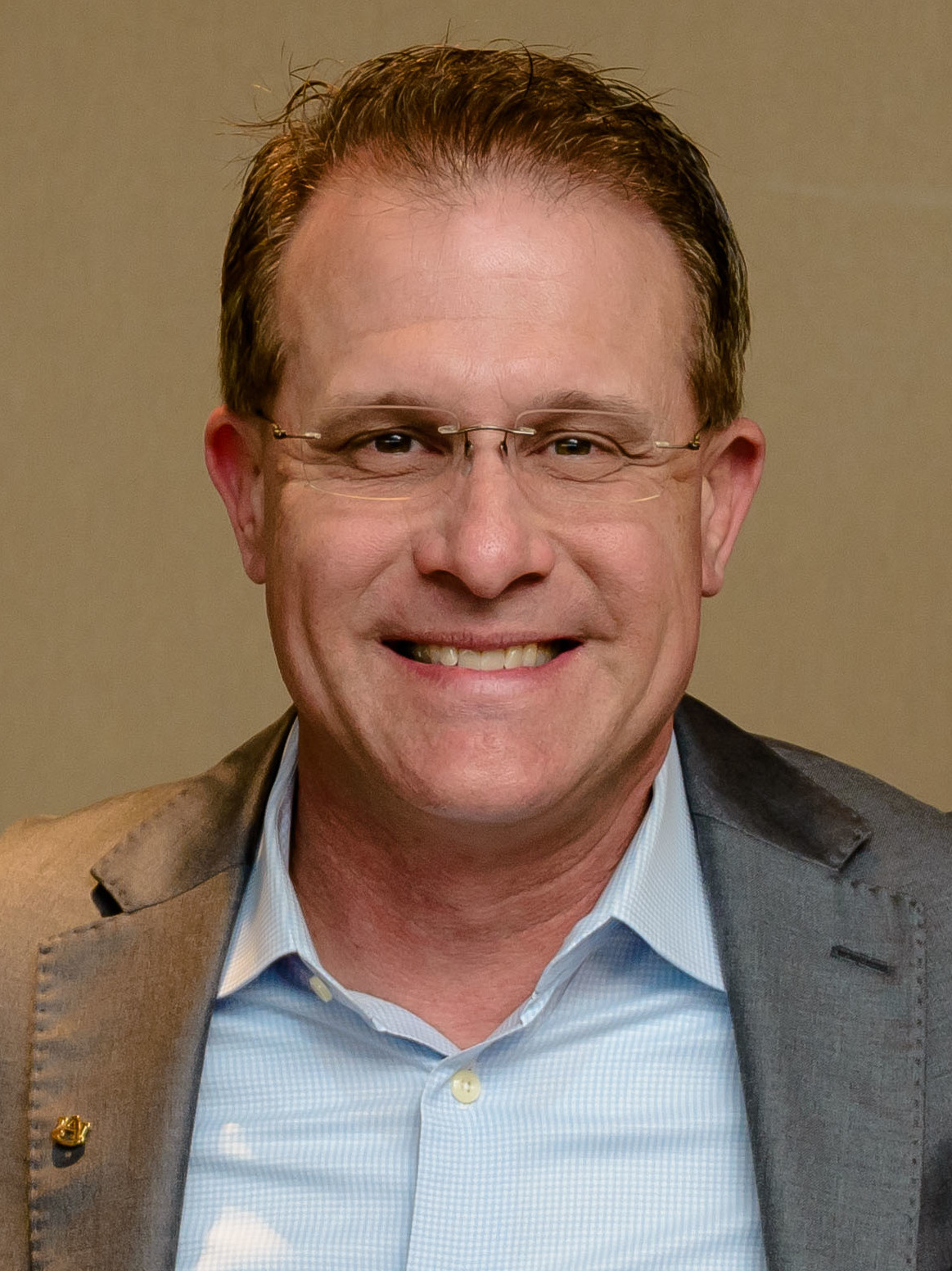
- Malzahn in 2018

Biographical details
- Born: October 28, 1965 (age 61); Irving, Texas, U.S.

Playing career
- 1984–1985: Arkansas
- 1987–1989: Henderson State
- Position: Wide receiver

Coaching career (HC unless noted)
- 1991: Hughes HS (AR) (OC)
- 1992–1995: Hughes HS (AR)
- 1996–2000: Shiloh Christian HS (AR)
- 2001–2005: Springdale HS (AR)
- 2006: Arkansas (OC/WR)
- 2007–2008: Tulsa (AHC/co-OC/QB)
- 2009–2011: Auburn (OC/QB)
- 2012: Arkansas State
- 2013–2020: Auburn
- 2021–2024: UCF
- 2025: Florida State (OC)

Head coaching record
- Overall: 105–62 (college); 144–36–1 (high school)
- Bowls: 3–7

Accomplishments and honors

Championships
- As a head coach 1 SEC (2013); 1 Sun Belt (2012); 2 SEC Western Division (2013, 2017) As an assistant coach 1 National (2010); 1 SEC (2010); 1 SEC Western Division (2010)

Awards
- As a head coach Paul "Bear" Bryant Award (2013); Bobby Bowden National Collegiate Coach of the Year Award (2013); SEC Coach of the Year (2013); Home Depot Coach of the Year (2013); Sporting News Coach of the Year (2013); Eddie Robinson Coach of the Year (2013); AP College Football Coach of the Year (2013); Liberty Mutual Coach of the Year Award (2013); Woody Hayes Trophy Coach of the Year (2013) As an assistant coach Broyles Award (2010); Rivals Offensive Coordinator of the Year (2006)

Arthur Gustavo Malzahn III (/mælˈzɑːn/; born October 28, 1965) is an American former college football coach who most recently was the offensive coordinator at Florida State. He was the head coach at the University of Central Florida (UCF) from 2021 to 2024, Auburn University from 2013 to 2020, and Arkansas State in 2012. He also served as offensive coordinator at Auburn from 2009 to 2011; in that role, he helped lead the 2010 Auburn Tigers to a national championship victory. As head coach at Auburn, he led the team to a SEC Championship win and an appearance in the 2014 National Championship. Malzahn has coached Heisman Trophy winner Cam Newton and two Heisman candidates: Nick Marshall and Tre Mason, including coaching 14 All-Americans. During Malzahn's tenure at Auburn, he was the second-longest tenured head coach at one school in the SEC, behind Nick Saban.

Prior to his stints at Arkansas State and Auburn, Malzahn was the offensive coordinator at the University of Arkansas and the University of Tulsa. He became the head coach at Arkansas State University after coaching at Auburn from 2009 to 2011. In his first year, he led his team to finish as the 2012 Sun Belt Champions. He returned to Auburn in 2013 as head coach; Malzahn received national attention for coaching one of the biggest in-season turnarounds in college football history. Malzahn inherited an Auburn Tigers football team that did not win a single Southeastern Conference game in the 2012 season, then led them to an SEC Championship and an appearance in the 2014 National Championship Game. The Tigers won their eighth SEC title and tallied a record of 12–2 (7–1 in SEC play), and Malzahn received several "coach of the year" awards, including the AP College Football Coach of the Year Award. Malzahn is the only head coach to ever win 100 career games at the high school and 100 career games at the collegiate FBS level.

== Playing career ==
Malzahn graduated from Fort Smith Christian High School in Fort Smith, Arkansas in 1984 and was a walk-on receiver at Arkansas under then-head coach Ken Hatfield in 1984 and 1985 before transferring to Henderson State University located in Arkadelphia, Arkansas, where he was a two-year letterman (1988, 1989) and earned his bachelor's degree in physical education in 1990.

== High school coaching career ==
Malzahn got his start as the offensive coordinator at Hughes High School in Hughes, Arkansas in 1991. He became head coach in 1992 and in 1994 Hughes reached the state championship game with an upset of Pine Bluff Dollarway. Hughes fell just short in the title game, losing to Lonoke High School on an interception in the final minute.

Malzahn's success at Hughes and his wide-open attack landed him a head coaching position at Shiloh Christian School in 1996. From 1996 to 2000, he transformed Shiloh Christian into one of the most dynamic offensive prep squads in the nation. In 1998, Shiloh Christian set a national record with 66 passing touchdowns for the season, while quarterback Josh Floyd nearly set an individual national record with 5,878 total yards (5,221 passing, 657 rushing). Malzahn guided the Saints to back-to-back state championships in 1998 and 1999.

In 2001, Malzahn took over for long-time coach Jarrell Williams at Springdale High School. Malzahn continued the rich tradition of the Bulldogs’ program. He led the program to two state championship game appearances in his last four years, winning the title in 2005.

Malzahn led his squad to the state title game in only his second season in 2002. The Bulldogs lost 17–10 to Fort Smith Southside.

Springdale was on track for another state title game appearance in 2004 before Little Rock Central sidetracked the Bulldogs’ title hopes in the state semifinals. Springdale was upset by the eventual state champion, 31–20. The Bulldogs finished the season at 12–1.

Malzahn's 2005 squad at Springdale went 14–0, easily won the state's Class AAAAA championship, outscored its opponents 664–118, including a 54–20 victory over West Memphis in the state championship game, and was consistently ranked among the top 10 teams in the nation.

Included on the championship team were prize recruits Mitch Mustain, Ben Cleveland, Andrew Norman, and Damian Williams who all eventually joined Malzahn at the University of Arkansas. Offensive tackle Bartley Webb decided to leave the state to play for the University of Notre Dame.

In 2013, Malzahn was inducted into the Arkansas High School Coaches Association's Hall of Fame.

== College coaching career ==
=== Arkansas ===
Malzahn joined Houston Nutt's staff on December 9, 2005, as offensive coordinator and wide receivers coach, following an impressive five-year run at Springdale High School capped by one of the most dominant seasons by any high school in 2005. Given that much of Springdale High's football talent decided to follow Malzahn to Arkansas and the fact that Malzahn had never coached in college, many questioned what Houston Nutt's motives were. Malzahn led the offense of the Razorbacks' 2006 season in which they won the SEC Western Division championship. They played Florida in the 2006 SEC Championship Game but lost (28–38). Arkansas finished the season with a 10–4 record and lost to Wisconsin in the Capital One Bowl.

There was a widely reported tension between Nutt's reliance on the ground game (which turned out to be one of the best running games in the nation in 2006) and Malzahn's philosophy of spreading the field with a no-huddle offense. The poor ending of the season only added stress to the already tense coaching relationship. Malzahn was named the National Offensive Coordinator of the Year by Rivals.com.

Despite this tension, the 2006 season served as a breakout for running backs Darren McFadden (1,647 yards with 14 TD) and Felix Jones (1,168 yards with 6 TD). Wide receiver Marcus Monk had 962 yards receiving with 11 touchdowns, despite catching passes from two quarterbacks.

In January 2007, Malzahn received an offer from the University of Tulsa and his friend, new head coach Todd Graham. He took the Tulsa job to be assistant head coach and offensive coordinator.

Shortly after the departure of Coach Graham and Malzahn, both Arkansas star quarterback Mitch Mustain and receiver Damian Williams decided to transfer to the University of Southern California.

=== Tulsa ===
Malzahn was announced as the new assistant head coach, offensive coordinator, and quarterbacks coach in January 2007. During the 2007 season, Malzahn emerged as one of the premier offensive coordinators in the nation, as Tulsa ranked first in the nation in total yards per game, ahead of Texas Tech and Hawaii, and with a more balanced attack than both teams. The Golden Hurricane also ranked third in the nation in passing and led their conference in scoring. Tulsa became the first team in NCAA history to have a 5,000-yard passer, a 1,000-yard rusher and three 1,000-yard receivers in a single season.

After the regular season, Malzahn interviewed for the open position at Arkansas once Nutt resigned in November 2007.

In 2008, Tulsa was once again the nation's most prolific attack, leading with nearly 7,980 total yards of offense averaging 570 yards per game. The Golden Hurricane were ranked second in the nation in scoring behind Oklahoma, scoring over 47 points per game. Tulsa not only ranked second in the nation in scoring that year, but finished with the second highest scoring offense in the history of major college football. The offense was also the nation's most balanced attack, ranking fifth in the nation in rushing and ninth in passing. Tulsa quarterbacks David Johnson and G. J. Kinne finished third in the nation in passing efficiency, behind only Oklahoma and Texas.

=== Offensive coordinator at Auburn ===
Malzahn was named the offensive coordinator at Auburn University by first year head coach Gene Chizik on December 28, 2008. Under Malzahn, Auburn made significant improvements over the previous season's offensive production; the Tigers finished the season ranked 16th in total offense (2nd in the SEC against all opponents) with just under 432 yards per game and 17th in scoring with over 33 points per game after being tied for 110th in the nation in scoring the previous season. Although he still made significant improvements in his first year, against SEC competition Auburn managed 377.1 total yards a game which placed them 4th in the SEC (behind Alabama, Arkansas, and Ole Miss). His first season broke the Auburn single season total offense record previously set by the undefeated 2004 team. Head coach Gene Chizik had stressed prior to the season that he intended to focus on the run game which showed great improvement as well; the rushing offense finished the season ranked 13th in the nation with 212 yards per game after being ranked 69th prior to the new coaching staff's arrival. Passing numbers also improved under the new offensive scheme, with the passing efficiency ranking ending up 22nd nationally after being ranked 106th in 2008. Senior quarterback Chris Todd set a single-season touchdown record at Auburn and finished the season with a passer rating of 145.73, ranking him 18th in the nation. During the 2009 season, Auburn's offense under Malzahn, produced 120 plays of 15 yards or more, nearly doubling the 62 compiled in 2008.

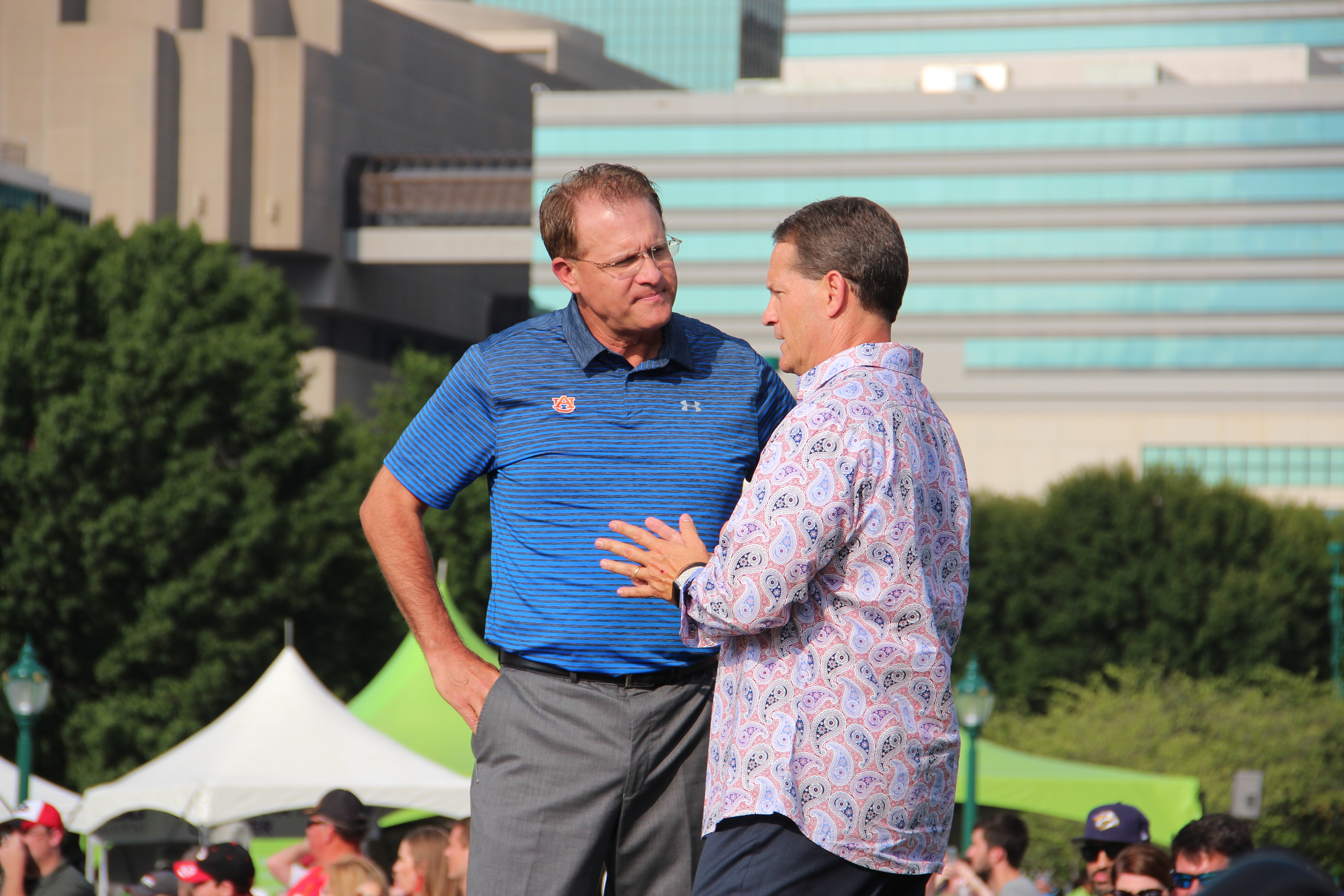
Malzahn with Gene Chizik in 2018.

In 2010, Malzahn was given a raise making him the highest-paid assistant coach in the country. After recruiting Cam Newton, Malzahn worked to refine his throwing mechanics to become a true dual-threat quarterback and learn Malzahn's offense. Malzahn's offense, led by eventual Heisman Trophy winner Newton at quarterback, helped Auburn achieve an undefeated record, a No. 1 national ranking after the regular season and a berth in the BCS Championship game, played on January 10, 2011. Auburn led the SEC in scoring offense, total offense, rushing offense, pass efficiency, first downs and third down conversions on its way to a 13–0 record and a 56–17 victory over South Carolina in the SEC Championship Game. Malzahn was awarded the 2010 Broyles Award, recognizing him as the top assistant coach in the nation. Auburn went on to win the 2011 BCS National Championship Game against Oregon. In 2011, ESPN selected Malzahn as one of the best recruiters in the Southeastern Conference that year as well.

=== Arkansas State ===
On December 13, 2011, Malzahn left Auburn to accept the position of head football coach at Arkansas State University. In his first and only year at Arkansas State, Malzahn led the team to a 9–3 regular season record and a Conference Championship with a win over Middle Tennessee State, 45–0. Malzahn closed out the season leading the Red Wolves to a 17–13 victory over Kent State in the GoDaddy.com Bowl. The future All-Pro Linebacker and 2021 NFL Bart Starr Award winner, Demario Davis, was selected 77th overall in the third round of the 2012 NFL draft. Several other players went onto the NFL, such as defensive backs Kelcie McCray, James Bradberry, Don Jones, defensive lineman Ryan Carrethers and slotback J. D. McKissic. Both Bradberry and McCray became All-Pro NFL players. Jones made an NFL All-Rookie Team.

=== Head coach at Auburn ===
After Malzahn's departure in 2011, Auburn went 3–9 and 0–8 in conference play in the 2012 Auburn season. With Malzahn's absence, media and alumni criticized coach Chizik, claiming he only won a championship at Auburn due to Malzahn's playcalling and assisting him as head coach.

On December 4, 2012, Malzahn was announced to replace Gene Chizik as the head coach of Auburn University shortly after winning the Sun Belt Conference Championship. Malzahn's first hires were defensive coordinator Ellis Johnson (former head coach at Southern Miss and previously coached as defensive coordinator at several SEC schools) and offensive coordinator Rhett Lashlee (who followed Malzahn from Arkansas State, where he was also the offensive coordinator).

In 2013, the Auburn Tiger offense under Malzahn was led by quarterback Nick Marshall. On November 16, 2013, with the Tigers down by 1 against Georgia facing 4th-and-18 and 36 seconds left in the game, Malzahn called the play "Little Rock" for Marshall which would become known as "The Prayer at Jordan–Hare". Marshall hit Ricardo Louis on a tipped 73-yard Hail Mary pass to give Auburn the victory.

Two weeks later, in the Iron Bowl against Alabama, Malzahn's Tigers avenged two consecutive blowout losses to the Tide with a dramatic 34–28 win, clinched on an epic 109-yard return of a missed field goal for the game-winning touchdown as time expired, nicknamed the "Kick Six". The win completed the greatest single-season turnaround in SEC history, and gave Auburn the SEC West title. Auburn would go on to win the 2013 SEC Championship game later that year against the Missouri Tigers. On December 8, it was announced that Auburn would play the Florida State Seminoles in the 2014 BCS Championship Game.

After leading the heavily favored Seminoles 21–3 in the second quarter, Auburn failed to stay in front and the lead slowly slipped away. Heisman Trophy winner Jameis Winston stepped up in the fourth quarter and rallied the Seminoles to a victory, leading the way with 6-of-7 passing for 77 yards en route to the go-ahead scoring touchdown. Auburn lost in the 2014 BCS Championship Game to the Florida State Seminoles by a score of 34–31.

Malzahn won the 2013 Eddie Robinson Coach of the Year, Sporting News College Football Coach of the Year, and Home Depot Coach of the Year Awards as well as the SEC Coach of the Year by the AP and coaches. On December 10, fans voted him the recipient of the inaugural Premier Coach of College Football Award. On December 23, it was announced that Malzahn had won the Associated Press National Coach of the Year, edging out Duke's David Cutcliffe, 33 votes to 17. Malzahn is only the second coach to win the award in their first season with a new team. In January 2014, after the national championship game, Malzahn was awarded the Paul "Bear" Bryant Award and the Bobby Bowden Coach of the Year Award to bring the total number of national coach of the year awards to six for the first year head coach in the 2013–14 season. Running back Tre Mason was voted the SEC Offensive Player of the Year and five players were selected to the 2013 All-SEC football team.

In the 2016 season, Auburn had the fourth-toughest schedule in the country. Despite the schedule and various team injuries, Malzahn managed to lead the Tigers to a New Year's Six Sugar Bowl appearance against Oklahoma. Kamryn Pettway led the SEC and ranked 11th in the nation in rushing yards per game, which made him a Doak Walker Award semifinalist (top running back in college football). Seven players were selected to the 2016 All-SEC football team.

In 2017, Malzahn led the Tigers to the SEC Championship game by defeating #1 ranked Georgia and #1 ranked Alabama over the span of three weeks. In a rematch with the Georgia Bulldogs, Auburn lost the 2017 SEC Championship Game 28–7. They went on to play UCF in the NY6 Peach Bowl where they would lose 34–27. Kerryon Johnson earned the 2017 SEC Offensive Player of the Year award and seven players selected to the 2017 All-SEC football team. Immediately after the season, Malzahn agreed to a seven-year, $49 million contract extension with Auburn.

In the 2018 season, Malzahn led the Tigers to a 7–5 regular season record. The team defeated Purdue 63–14 in the Music City Bowl to cap off the season.

In the 2019 season, Malzahn led the Tigers to a 9–3 regular season record. The season was highlighted by ranked victories over Oregon, Texas A&M, and Alabama. The Tigers fell to Minnesota in the Outback Bowl.

On December 13, 2020, Malzahn was fired as head coach of Auburn at the conclusion of his eighth winning season. He finished with a 68–35 record, including 39–27 in the SEC. Auburn committed to buy out the remainder of his contract, for $21.45 million.

Malzahn reached fifth on Auburn's all-time wins list, behind Shug Jordan, Mike Donahue, Pat Dye and Tommy Tuberville. During his time at Auburn, he coached 12 All-America Team players. Malzahn had a total of 36 players selected in the NFL draft under him, averaging 4.6 draft picks per year (the third-most in history by an Auburn coach).

He has produced three NFL draft classes of at least five players drafted. In 2019 and 2020, Auburn had back-to-back years of six players drafted, a feat none of the last three previous Auburn coaches ever did once.

=== UCF ===
On February 15, 2021, Malzahn was named the head coach at UCF, reuniting him with former Arkansas State athletic director Terry Mohajir. Malzahn was signed to a five-year, $11.5 million contract that would make him the head coach through the 2025 season.

His tenure began strongly in 2021. On September 2, Malzahn won his first game with the Knights, defeating Boise State (36–31). Despite an injury-plagued campaign that left the starting lineup missing 27 total starters or rotational players by bowl time, he guided UCF to an 8–4 regular-season record and a (29–17) victory over in-state rival Florida in the Gasparilla Bowl, finishing 9–4 overall.

The momentum continued in 2022, as Malzahn's offense ranked 26th nationally in scoring, 11th in yards per game, and 8th in rushing. UCF went 9–3 in the regular season, earning a spot in the AAC Championship with a (46–39) win over rival South Florida, though they lost the rematch to #14 Tulane (28–45). The season ended at 9–5 with a (30–13) defeat to Duke in the Military Bowl.

Prior to the 2023 season, Malzahn received a contract extension through 2027, including a raise to $4 million annually (increasing to $5.5 million in 2026).

UCF's move to the Big 12 in 2023 brought new challenges amid 2021-2024 NCAA conference realignment. The Knights opened 3–0 (including an 18–16 win at Boise State) but dropped five straight, featuring a blown 28-point lead in a 36–35 home loss to Baylor and a 31–29 defeat at #6 Oklahoma. A late rally produced wins in three of the final four games, including a 45–3 upset of #15 Oklahoma State and a 27–13 victory over Houston to secure bowl eligibility for the eighth straight year (third under Malzahn). UCF finished 6–7 after a 30–17 loss to Georgia Tech in the Gasparilla Bowl. The offense ranked 5th nationally in rushing yards per game and 8th in total yards per game, while the defense struggled (121st in rushing yards allowed per game, last in the Big 12). Wide receivers Kobe Hudson (44 receptions, 900, 8 TDs) and Javon Baker (52 receptions, 1,139 yards, 7 TDs) both All-Big 12 honors were key contributors before Baker entered the draft process.

The 2024 season started promisingly at 3–0, including a 21-point comeback conference win against TCU. However, UCF lost eight of the next nine games, finishing 4–8 and missing bowl eligibility for the first time since 2015—this marked Malzahn's first non-bowl season as a head coach. Running back RJ Harvey stood out as one of Malzahn's premier backs, breaking out with 1,577 rushing yards (Big 12-leading, 3rd nationally), 22 rushing touchdowns (3rd nationally), 267 receiving yards, 3 receiving TDs, 1,844 all-purpose yards, and 25 total TDs. Harvey earned 2024 All-American honors, first-team All-Big 12 recognition, and set UCF records for career touchdowns (48) while ranking second in career rushing touchdowns (43). He was selected in the second round (No. 60 overall) by the Denver Broncos in the 2025 NFL Draft, the highest-drafted running back in UCF history.

Malzahn's UCF teams developed talent that reached the NFL, producing four draft picks: Javon Baker (2024, 4th round No. 110 overall, New England Patriots), Tylan Grable (OT, 2024, 6th round No. 204 overall, Buffalo Bills), RJ Harvey (RB, 2025, 2nd round No. 60 overall, Denver Broncos), and Mac McWilliams (CB, 2025, 5th round No. 145 overall, Philadelphia Eagles). Other Knights who advanced to the pros include John Rhys Plumlee, Brandon Johnson, and Tatum Bethune.

Malzahn's tenure featured some early bowl success and high recruiting classes but ended amid struggles in the Big 12. On November 30, 2024, following a 14–28 loss to Utah, Malzahn resigned to become offensive coordinator at Florida State. Malzahn compiled a 28–24 overall record during his four seasons (2021–2024) at UCF.

=== Florida State ===
Malzahn resigned as the head coach at UCF on November 30, 2024, to become the new offensive coordinator at Florida State. Despite a 5–7 record in the 2025 season, Malzahn had the Seminoles ranked third in the conference in points per game.

==== Retirement ====
On February 2, 2026, Malzahn announced his retirement from coaching.

== Offensive philosophy ==
One of the most innovative offensive minds in football^{[citation needed]}, Malzahn's is known for his hurry-up offense, an offensive philosophy that does not utilize a huddle. In January 2003, he published a book and instructional video titled Hurry Up No Huddle – An Offensive Philosophy (ISBN 9781585186549). A majority of college football programs have adopted this no-huddle, up-tempo offensive philosophy. Several National Football League teams adopted some of Malzahn's offensive strategies.

== Coaching tree ==
Malzahn is from the Houston Nutt coaching tree. Coach Nutt took a huge risk hiring Malzahn as offense coordinator because, despite being one of the most dominant high school coaches, he had never coached at the college level. Despite this, Malzahn quickly became one of the winningest coaches, known for his hurry-up, no-huddle offense.

=== Head coaches Malzahn served under ===
Note: These head coaches are considered key mentors in Gus Malzahn's coaching tree and development. They provided his first major college opportunities.

- Houston Nutt: Arkansas (2006)
- Todd Graham: Tulsa (2007–2008)
- Gene Chizik: Auburn (2009–2011)

=== Players ===
The following coaches were former players under Malzahn that later became head coaches:

- Brennan Marion: Sacramento State (2025)
- G. J. Kinne: Incarnate Word (2022), Texas State (2023–present)
- Rhett Lashlee: SMU (2022–present)

=== Assistant coaches under Malzahn who became head coaches ===
- Bobby Bentley: Presbyterian College (2007–2008), Battle Ground Academy (2024–present)
- Brent Dearmon: Bethel (TN) (2018), North Alabama (2023–present)
- Kenny Dillingham: Arizona State (2023–present)
- Eliah Drinkwitz: Appalachian State (2019), Missouri (2020–present)
- Dell McGee: Georgia State (2024–present)
- Mike Norvell: Memphis (2016–2019), Florida State (2020–2026)
- Rhett Lashlee: SMU (2022–present)
- Chip Lindsey: Troy (2019–2021)
- Jake Spavital: Texas State (2019–2022)
- Cadillac Williams: Auburn (2022) (Note: Served as interim head coach in 2022)

== Head coaching record ==
=== College ===
Year	Team	Overall	Conference	Standing	Bowl/playoffs	Coaches^{#}	AP^{°}
Arkansas State Red Wolves (Sun Belt Conference) (2012)
2012	Arkansas State	9–3	7–1	1st	GoDaddy.com*		
Arkansas State:		9–3	7–1	* Did not coach bowl game			
Auburn Tigers (Southeastern Conference) (2013–2020)
2013	Auburn	12–2	7–1	T–1st (Western)	L BCS NCG^{†}	2	2
2014	Auburn	8–5	4–4	T–4th (Western)	L Outback	23	22
2015	Auburn	7–6	2–6	7th (Western)	W Birmingham		
2016	Auburn	8–5	5–3	T–2nd (Western)	L Sugar^{†}	22	24
2017	Auburn	10–4	7–1	T–1st (Western)	L Peach^{†}	12	10
2018	Auburn	8–5	3–5	5th (Western)	W Music City		
2019	Auburn	9–4	5–3	3rd (Western)	L Outback	14	14
2020	Auburn	6–4	6–4	3rd (Western)	Citrus*		
Auburn:		68–35	39–27	* Did not coach bowl game			
UCF Knights (American Athletic Conference) (2021–2022)
2021	UCF	9–4	5–3	T–3rd	W Gasparilla		
2022	UCF	9–5	6–2	T–2nd	L Military		
UCF Knights (Big 12 Conference) (2023–2024)
2023	UCF	6–7	3–6	T–9th	L Gasparilla		
2024	UCF	4–8	2–7	T–13th			
UCF:		28–24	16–18				
Total:		105–62					
National championship Conference title Conference division title or championship game berth
^{†}Indicates BCS or CFP / New Years' Six bowl.; ^{#}Rankings from final Coaches Poll.; ^{°}Rankings from final AP Poll.

=== High school ===
Year	Team	Overall	Conference	Standing	Bowl/playoffs
Hughes Blue Devils () (1992–1995)
1992	Hughes	4–6	3–4		
1993	Hughes	6–4	4–2		
1994	Hughes	10–4	4–2		
1995	Hughes	8–3	4–2		
Hughes:		28–17	15–10		
Shiloh Christian Saints () (1996–2000)
1996	Shiloh Christian	6–6	4–0	1st	
1997	Shiloh Christian	14–1	3–0	1st	
1998	Shiloh Christian	15–0	0–0	1st	
1999	Shiloh Christian	15–0	1–0	1st	
2000	Shiloh Christian	13–1–1	6–0	1st	
Shiloh Christian:		63–8–1	14–0		
Springdale Bulldogs () (2001–2005)
2001	Springdale	7–4	4–3		
2002	Springdale	12–2	6–1	1st	
2003	Springdale	8–4	5–2		
2004	Springdale	12–1	7–0	1st	
2005	Springdale	14–0	7–0	1st	
Springdale:		53–11	29–6		
Total:		144–36–1			
National championship Conference title Conference division title or championship game berth

== Published works ==
- The Hurry Up, No Huddle: An Offensive Philosophy (2003) (ISBN 978-1-585186-54-9)

== Personal life ==
Malzahn is married and has two children.
