= 2023 Gasparilla Bowl =

Postseason college football bowl game

2023 Union Home Mortgage Gasparilla Bowl
- 15th Gasparilla Bowl
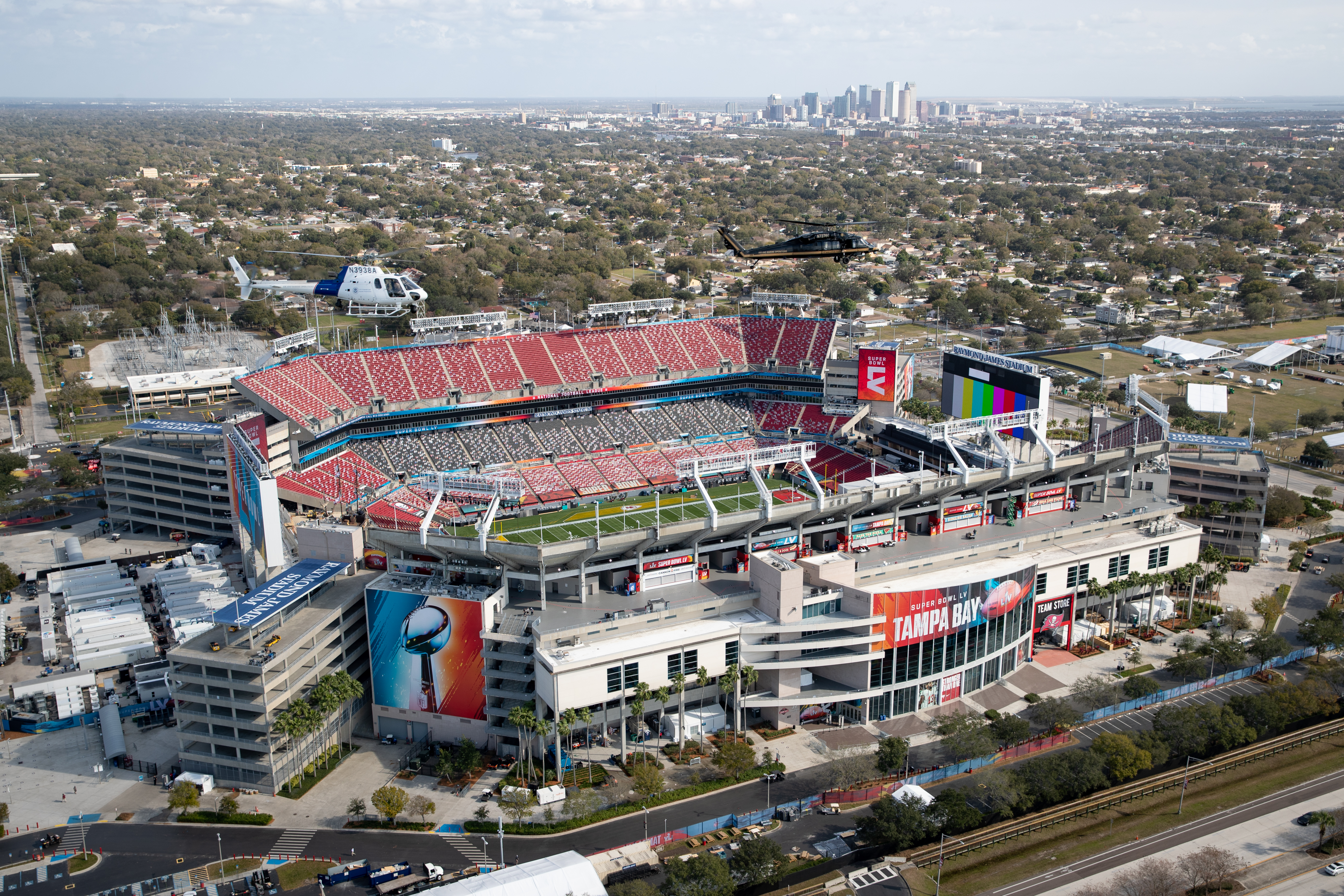
- Raymond James Stadium in Tampa, Florida, the site of the Gasparilla Bowl.
| Georgia Tech Yellow Jackets | UCF Knights |
| (6–6) | (6–6) |
| ACC | Big 12 |
| 30 | 17 |
| Head coach: Brent Key | Head coach: Gus Malzahn |
| | 1 | 2 | 3 | 4 | Total |
|---|---|---|---|---|---|
| Georgia Tech | 0 | 17 | 3 | 10 | 30 |
| UCF | 14 | 3 | 0 | 0 | 17 |
- Date: December 22, 2023
- Season: 2023
- Stadium: Raymond James Stadium
- Location: Tampa, Florida
- MVP: Jamal Haynes (RB, Georgia Tech)
- Favorite: UCF by 4.5
- Referee: Cravonne Barrett (Pac-12)
- Attendance: 30,281

United States TV coverage
- Network: ESPN
- Announcers: Wes Durham (play-by-play), Tim Hasselbeck (analyst), and Taylor Tannebaum (sideline)

International TV coverage
- Network: ESPN Deportes and ESPN Brazil
- Announcers: ESPN Brazil: Vinicius Moura (play-by-play) and Eduardo Zolin (analyst)

The 2023 Gasparilla Bowl was a college football bowl game played on December 22, 2023, at Raymond James Stadium in Tampa, Florida. The 15th annual Gasparilla Bowl featured the Georgia Tech Yellow Jackets from the Atlantic Coast Conference (ACC) and the UCF Knights from the Big 12 Conference. The game began at approximately 6:30 p.m. EST and was aired on ESPN. The Gasparilla Bowl was one of the 2023–24 bowl games concluding the 2023 FBS football season. The game was sponsored by mortgage loan company Union Home Mortgage and was officially known as the Union Home Mortgage Gasparilla Bowl.

== Teams ==
This game features the Georgia Tech Yellow Jackets from the Atlantic Coast Conference (ACC) and the UCF Knights from the Big 12 Conference.

This is the sixth meeting between Georgia Tech and UCF—entering the game, the Yellow Jackets led the Knights in the all-time series, 3–2.

=== Georgia Tech Yellow Jackets ===
The Yellow Jackets entered the game with a 6–6 record (5–3 in the ACC), having tied for fourth place in their conference.

This is Georgia Tech's first appearance in the Gasparilla Bowl.

=== UCF Knights ===
The Knights entered the game with a 6–6 record (3–6 in the Big 12), having tied for ninth place in their conference. In their inaugural season in the Big 12, the Knights were the only one of the conference's four 2023 newcomers to become bowl-eligible.

This is UCF's sixth Gasparilla Bowl, extending their record for most appearances in the game. The Knights' record in prior Gasparilla Bowl appearances was 3–2, tied with Marshall for most Gasparilla Bowl wins by a team.

== Game summary ==
2023 Union Home Mortgage Gasparilla Bowl

| Quarter | 1 | 2 | 3 | 4 | Total |
|---|---|---|---|---|---|
| Georgia Tech | 0 | 17 | 3 | 10 | 30 |
| UCF | 14 | 3 | 0 | 0 | 17 |

at Raymond James Stadium • Tampa, Florida

- Date: Friday, December 22, 2023
- Game time: 6:30 p.m. EST
- Game weather: Clear • Temperature: 66 °F (19 °C) • Wind: 6 mph (9.7 km/h) NE
- Game attendance: 30,281
- Referee: Cravonne Barrett
- TV announcers (ESPN): Wes Durham (play-by-play), Tim Hasselbeck (analyst), and Taylor Tannebaum (sideline)
- Box score

Game information

First quarter

- (13:37) UCF – Javon Baker 23-yard pass from John Rhys Plumlee, Colton Boomer kick (Drive: 4 plays, 51 yards, 1:23; UCF 7–0)
- (6:26) UCF – Kobe Hudson 17-yard pass from John Rhys Plumlee, Colton Boomer kick (Drive: 10 plays, 98 yards, 4:41; UCF 14–0)

Second quarter

- (14:17) GT – Aidan Birr 36-yard field goal (Drive: 7 plays, 39 yards, 3:00; UCF 14–3)
- (8:23) UCF – Colton Boomer 27-yard field goal (Drive: 13 plays, 59 yards, 5:54; UCF 17–3)
- (4:23) GT – Haynes King 5-yard run, Aidan Birr kick (Drive: 7 plays, 74 yards, 4:00; UCF 17–10)
- (0:56) GT – Malik Rutherford 41-yard pass from Haynes King, Aidan Birr kick (Drive: 6 plays, 67 yards, 2:59; Tied 17–17)

Third quarter

- (12:07) GT – Aidan Birr 29-yard field goal (Drive: 6 plays, 54 yards, 2:53; Georgia Tech 20–17)

Fourth quarter

- (13:37) GT – Dontae Smith 1-yard run, Aidan Birr kick (Drive: 13 plays, 75 yards, 6:51; Georgia Tech 27–17)
- (4:52) GT – Aidan Birr 38-yard field goal (Drive: 10 plays, 42 yards, 5:53; Georgia Tech 30–17)

=== Statistics ===
| Statistics | GT | UCF |
|---|---|---|
| First downs | 21 | 19 |
| Plays–yards | 69–371 | 69–424 |
| Rushes–yards | 53–284 | 34–169 |
| Passing yards | 87 | 255 |
| Passing: comp–att–int | 7–13–1 | 17–33–1 |
| Time of possession | 33:30 | 26:30 |

| Team | Category | Player | Statistics |
|---|---|---|---|
| Georgia Tech | Passing | Haynes King | 7/13, 87 yards, 1 TD, 1 INT |
| Georgia Tech | Rushing | Jamal Haynes | 18 carries, 128 yards |
| Georgia Tech | Receiving | Malik Rutherford | 2 receptions, 40 yards, 1 TD |
| UCF | Passing | John Rhys Plumlee | 16/29, 198 yards, 2 TD |
| UCF | Rushing | RJ Harvey | 15 carries, 120 yards |
| UCF | Receiving | Javon Baker | 9 receptions, 173 yards, 1 TD |
