= 2023 Georgia Tech Yellow Jackets football team =

American college football season

2023 Georgia Tech Yellow Jackets football

Gasparilla Bowl champion

Gasparilla Bowl, W 30–17 vs. UCF
- Conference: Atlantic Coast Conference
- Record: 7–6 (5–3 ACC)
- Head coach: Brent Key (1st season)
- Offensive coordinator: Buster Faulkner (1st season)
- Co-offensive coordinator: Chris Weinke (1st season)
- Offensive scheme: Pro spread
- Defensive coordinator: Kevin Sherrer (1st season)
- Base defense: 4–2–5
- Home stadium: Bobby Dodd Stadium

Uniform
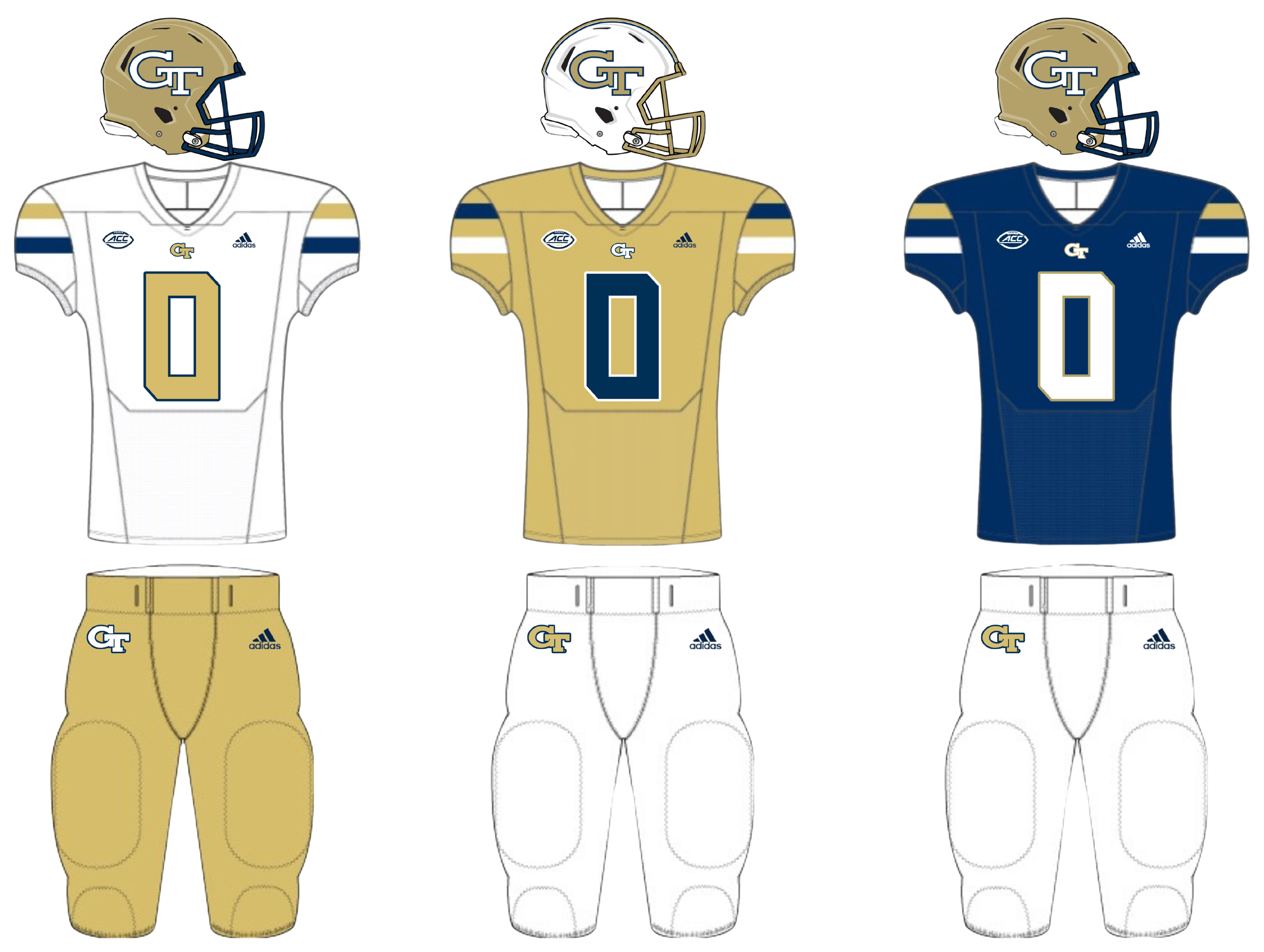

2023 Atlantic Coast Conference football standings
	Conf.			Overall
Team	W		L	W		L
No. 6 Florida State y$	8	–	0	13	–	1
No. 19 Louisville y	7	–	1	10	–	4
No. 21 NC State	6	–	2	9	–	4
Georgia Tech	5	–	3	7	–	6
Virginia Tech	5	–	3	7	–	6
No. 20 Clemson	4	–	4	9	–	4
Duke	4	–	4	8	–	5
North Carolina	4	–	4	8	–	5
Boston College	3	–	5	7	–	6
Miami (FL)	3	–	5	7	–	6
Syracuse	2	–	6	6	–	7
Pittsburgh	2	–	6	3	–	9
Virginia	2	–	6	3	–	9
Wake Forest	1	–	7	4	–	8
Championship: Florida State 16, Louisville 6
$ – Conference champion; y – Championship game participant; Rankings from AP Poll

The 2023 Georgia Tech Yellow Jackets football team represented the Georgia Institute of Technology as a member of the Atlantic Coast Conference during the 2023 NCAA Division I FBS football season. The Yellow Jackets were led by Brent Key in his first full year as Georgia Tech's head coach. They played their home games at Bobby Dodd Stadium in Atlanta.

The season is notable for upsets of North Carolina and Miami, both of which were ranked 17th at the time of the game. In a back-and-forth shootout, Georgia Tech scored 22 points in the final 13 minutes to defeat the Tar Heels 46–42. The North Carolina game was ranked as one of the 25 best games of the season by ESPN's Bill Connelly.

The Miami game was marked by Miami's decision to run the ball instead of taking a knee in the final 40 seconds, leading to a fumble recovered by Georgia Tech. Georgia Tech went on to drive 74 yards in four plays, and score a touchdown with 2 seconds on the clock to upset the previously undefeated Hurricanes.

Georgia Tech would finish fourth in the ACC. The Yellow Jackets ended the season with a win over UCF in the Gasparilla Bowl, their first bowl game and first winning record since 2018.

The Georgia Tech Yellow Jackets football team drew an average home attendance of 36,290 in 2023.

== Offseason ==
=== NFL draft ===
One Yellow Jacket was selected in the 2023 NFL Draft.

Player	Position	Team	Round	Pick
Keion White	DE	New England Patriots	2	46

=== Transfers ===
==== Outgoing ====
Player	Position	Destination
Demetrius Knight	LB	Charlotte
Jude Kelley	K	Chattanooga
Ryan King	WR	East Carolina
RJ Adams	OL	Lackawanna College
Taisun Phommachanh	QB	UMass
Derrik Allen	S	North Carolina
Paula Vaipulu	OL	North Texas
Nate McCollum	WR	North Carolina
Dylan McDuffie	RB	Kansas
Jeff Sims	QB	Nebraska
Kalani Norris	WR	Middle Tennessee
Zamari Walton	CB	Ole Miss
Jeremiah Smith	S	Unknown
Kenny Bennett	CB	Unknown
Jalen Huff	CB	Florida Atlantic
Grey Carroll	DE	Liberty
Ben Postma	TE	Unknown
Antonio Martin	RB	Unknown
Khatavian Franks	LB	Duquesne
K.J. Miles	DE	Temple
Akelo Stone	DL	Ole Miss

==== Incoming ====
Player	Position	Previous School
Christian Leary	WR	Alabama
Jordan Brown	OL	Charlotte
Etinosa Reuben	DL	Clemson
Abdul Janneh	WR	Duquesne
Brett Seither	TE	Georgia
Dominick Blaylock	WR	Georgia
Paul Moala	LB	Idaho
Omar Daniels	S	Kansas State
Trevion Cooley	RB	Louisville
Braelen Oliver	LB	Minnesota
Justin Brown	S	Mississippi State
Austin Dean	LB	Rutgers
Andre White Jr.	LB	Texas A&M
Chase Lane	WR	Texas A&M
Haynes King	QB	Texas A&M
Jackson Long	TE	South Florida
Eddie Kelly	DL	South Florida

== Schedule ==
Georgia Tech and the ACC announced the 2023 football schedule on January 30, 2023. The 2023 season will be the conference's first season since 2004, that its scheduling format just includes one division. The new format sets Georgia Tech with three set conference opponents, while playing the remaining ten teams twice (home and away) in a four–year cycle. The Yellow Jackets three set conference opponents for the next four years are: Clemson, Louisville, and Wake Forest. As such, this is the first season since 1932 that the Yellow Jackets didn't play rival Duke.

Date	Time	Opponent	Site	TV	Result	Attendance
September 1	7:30 p.m.	vs. Louisville	Mercedes-Benz Stadium; Atlanta, GA (Aflac Kickoff)	ESPN	L 34–39	36,101
September 9	1:00 p.m.	South Carolina State*	Bobby Dodd Stadium; Atlanta, GA	ACCNX/ESPN+	W 48–13	31,452
September 16	7:30 p.m.	at No. 17 Ole Miss*	Vaught–Hemingway Stadium; Oxford, MS	SECN	L 23–48	64,150
September 23	6:30 p.m.	at Wake Forest	Allegacy Federal Credit Union Stadium; Winston-Salem, NC	The CW	W 30–16	32,528
September 30	3:30 p.m.	Bowling Green*	Bobby Dodd Stadium; Atlanta, GA	ACCN	L 27–38	30,097
October 7	8:00 p.m.	at No. 17 Miami (FL)	Hard Rock Stadium; Miami Gardens, FL	ACCN	W 23–20	58,045
October 21	12:00 p.m.	Boston College	Bobby Dodd Stadium; Atlanta, GA	ACCN	L 23–38	35,656
October 28	8:00 p.m.	No. 17 North Carolina^{†}	Bobby Dodd Stadium; Atlanta, GA	ACCN	W 46–42	35,945
November 4	2:00 p.m.	at Virginia	Scott Stadium; Charlottesville, VA	The CW	W 45–17	42,606
November 11	12:00 p.m.	at Clemson	Memorial Stadium; Clemson, SC (rivalry)	ABC	L 21–42	81,426
November 18	8:00 p.m.	Syracuse	Bobby Dodd Stadium; Atlanta, GA	ACCN	W 31–22	33,332
November 25	7:30 p.m.	No. 1 Georgia*	Bobby Dodd Stadium; Atlanta, GA (Clean, Old-Fashioned Hate)	ABC	L 23–31	51,447
December 22	6:30 p.m.	vs. UCF*	Raymond James Stadium; Tampa, FL (Gasparilla Bowl)	ESPN	W 30–17	30,281
*Non-conference game; ^{†}Homecoming; Rankings from AP Poll (and CFP Rankings, after November 2) - Released prior to game; All times are in Eastern time

== Game summaries ==
=== Louisville ===
Louisville Cardinals (0-0) at Georgia Tech Yellow Jackets (0-0) - Game summary

Quarter	1	2	3	4	Total
Cardinals	6	7	10	16	39
Yellow Jackets	0	28	0	6	34

at Mercedes-Benz Stadium • Atlanta, Georgia

- Date: September 1
- Game time: 7:30 p.m. EST/4:30 p.m. PST
- Game weather: Temperature: 72 °F (22 °C) • Indoors
- Game attendance: 36,101
- Referee: Riley Johnson
- TV announcers (ESPN): Anish Shroff (play-by-play), Andre Ware (analyst), and Paul Carcaterra (sideline)

Game information

First quarter

- 12:13 LOU - Brock Travelstead 33-yard field goal - 3-0 Louisville, Drive: 5 plays, 12 yards, 1:30
- 0:21 LOU - Brock Travelstead 30-yard field goal - 6-0 Louisville, Drive: 10 plays, 79 yards, 4:26

Second quarter

- 11:50 GT - Brett Seither 2-yard pass from Haynes King (Gavin Stewart kick) - 7-6 Georgia Tech, Drive: 9 plays, 75 yards, 3:31
- 9:03 GT - Trey Cooley 1-yard run (Gavin Stewart kick) - 14-6 Georgia Tech, Drive: 4 plays, 72 yards, 1:43
- 5:42 LOU - Kevin Coleman Jr. 9-yard pass from Jack Plummer (Brock Travelstead kick) - 14-13 Georgia Tech, Drive: 6 plays, 75 yards, 3:21
- 3:17 GT - Trey Cooley 23-yard run (Gavin Stewart kick) - 21-13 Georgia Tech, Drive: 5 plays, 75 yards, 2:25
- 0:42 GT - Chase Lane 48-yard pass from Haynes King (Gavin Stewart kick) - 28-13 Georgia Tech, Drive: 3 plays, 65 yards, 1:12

Third quarter

- 8:19 LOU - Brock Travelstead 22-yard field goal - 28-16 Georgia Tech, Drive: 13 plays, 68 yards, 6:34
- 4:41 LOU - Jamari Thrash 5-yard pass from Jack Plummer (Brock Travelstead kick) - 28-23 Georgia Tech, Drive: 6 plays, 65 yards, 2:49

Fourth quarter

- 8:08 LOU - Jamari Thrash 20-yard pass from Jack Plummer (Jack Plummer two-point pass incomplete) - 29-28 Louisville, Drive: 7 plays, 80 yards, 2:58
- 3:41 LOU - Jawhar Jordan 74-yard run (Brock Travelstead kick) - 36-28 Louisville, Drive: 1 play, 74 yards, 0:12
- 2:37 LOU - Brock Travelstead 38-yard field goal - 39-28 Louisville, Drive: 4 plays, 8 yards, 0:22
- 1:07 GT - Eric Singleton Jr. 5-yard pass from Haynes King (Haynes King two-point pass incomplete) - 39-34 Louisville, Drive: 7 plays, 75 yards, 1:30

Statistics	Louisville	Georgia Tech
First downs	21	23
Plays–yards	65–474	70-488
Rushes–yards	34–227	38–175
Passing yards	247	313
Passing: comp–att–int	18–31–1	19–32–1
Time of possession	29:54	30:06

Team	Category	Player	Statistics
Louisville	Passing	Jack Plummer	18/31, 247 yds, 3 TD, 1 INT
Louisville	Rushing	Jawhar Jordan	7 carries, 96 yards, 1 TD
Louisville	Receiving	Jamari Thrash	7 receptions, 88 yards, 2 TD
Georgia Tech	Passing	Haynes King	19/32, 313 yds, 3 TD, 1 INT
Georgia Tech	Rushing	Haynes King	10 carries, 53 yards
Georgia Tech	Receiving	Malik Rutherford	5 receptions, 85 yards

=== at No. 17 Ole Miss ===
Georgia Tech Yellow Jackets (1–1) at No. 17 Ole Miss Rebels (2–0)

Quarter	1	2	3	4	Total
Yellow Jackets	0	3	7	13	23
No. 17 Rebels	10	0	14	24	48

at Vaught-Hemingway Stadium • Oxford, MS

- Date: Saturday, September 16, 2023
- Game time: 6:30 p.m. CST
- Game weather: clear skies • Temperature: 85 °F (29 °C)
- Game attendance: 64,150
- Referee: Daniel Gautreaux
- TV announcers (SECN):
  Tom Hart (play-by-play)
  Jordan Rodgers (analyst)
  Cole Cubelic (sideline)

Game information

First Quarter

- (12:38) Ole Miss – Caden Davis 47 Yd Field Goal
  Ole Miss 3–0; 8 plays, 50 yards, 2:17
- (3:02) Ole Miss – Jaxson Dart 1 Yd Run (Caden Davis Kick)
  Ole Miss 10–0; 8 plays, 34 yards, 3:15

Second Quarter

- (1:09) Georgia Tech – Aidan Birr 22 Yd Field Goal
  Ole Miss 10–3; 17 plays, 90 yards, 8:26

Third Quarter

- (9:45) Ole Miss – Ulysses Bentley IV 21 Yd Run (Caden Davis Kick)
  Ole Miss 17–3; 5 plays, 71 yards, 2:19
- (6:00) Ole Miss – Jaxson Dart 6 Yd Run (Caden Davis Kick)
  Ole Miss 24–3; 5 plays, 28 yards, 1:38
- (2:07) Georgia Tech – Haynes King 1 Yd Run (Aidan Birr Kick)
  Ole Miss 24–10; 9 plays, 78 yards, 3:47

Fourth Quarter

- (10:31) Georgia Tech – Eric Singleton Jr. 15 Yd pass from Haynes King (Aidan Birr Kick)
  Ole Miss 24–17; 10 plays, 68 yards, 4:23
- (7:45) Ole Miss – Caden Davis 45 Yd Field Goal
  Ole Miss 27–17; 7 plays, 48 yards, 2:46
- (5:59) Ole Miss – Jordan Watkins 68 Yd pass from Jaxson Dart (Caden Davis Kick)
  Ole Miss 34–17; 2 plays, 68 yards, 0:41
- (3:40) Ole Miss – Quinshon Judkins 1 Yd Run (Caden Davis Kick)
  Ole Miss 41–17; 2 plays, 34 yards, 0:41
- (1:34) Georgia Tech – Avery Boyd 14 Yd pass from Haynes King (Two-Point Pass Conversion Failed)
  Ole Miss 41–23; 9 plays, 75 yards, 2:06
- (0:49) Ole Miss – Matt Jones 36 Yd Run (Caden Davis Kick)
  Ole Miss 48–23; 2 plays, 50 yards, 0:44

Statistics	Georgia Tech	Ole Miss
First downs	26	19
Total yards	474	550
Passing yards	307	251
Rushes/yards	47/167	37/299
Penalties/yards	0/0	5/40
Turnovers	0	0
Time of possession	39:17	20:43

Team	Category	Player	Statistics
Georgia Tech	Passing	Haynes King	28/41, 307 yards, 2 TD
Georgia Tech	Rushing	Jamal Haynes	19 carries, 72 yards
Georgia Tech	Receiving	Eric Singleton Jr.	5 receptions, 97 yards, 1 TD
Ole Miss	Passing	Jaxson Dart	10/18, 251 yards, 1 TD
Ole Miss	Rushing	Jaxson Dart	14 carries, 136 yards, 2 TD
Ole Miss	Receiving	Jordan Watkins	4 receptions, 119 yards, 1 TD

=== Bowling Green ===
Game Five – Bowling Green Falcons (1–3) at Georgia Tech Yellow Jackets (2–2) – Game summary

Quarter	1	2	3	4	Total
Bowling Green	7	10	21	0	38
Georgia Tech	14	0	6	7	27

at Bobby Dodd Stadium • Atlanta, Georgia

- Date: Saturday, September 30, 2023
- Game time: 3:30 p.m. EDT
- Game weather: Sunny, 85 °F (29 °C) • Wind: NE 3 mph (4.8 km/h)
- Game attendance: 30,097
- Referee: Jeff Flanagan
- TV announcers (ACCN): Chris Cotter, Mark Herzlich & Marilyn Payne

Game information

First quarter

- (14:43) GT – Eric Singleton Jr. 53-yard pass from Haynes King (Aidan Birr kick) (Drive: 1 play, 53 yards, :08; Georgia Tech 7-0)
- (09:40) GT – Christian Leary 11-yard pass from Haynes King (Aidan Birr kick) (Drive: 5 plays, 71 yards, 1:55; Georgia Tech 14-0)
- (04:16) BGSU – Camden Orth 1-yard run (Alan Anaya kick) (Drive: 10 plays, 75 yards, 5:24; Georgia Tech 14-7)

Second quarter

- (08:27) BGSU – Alan Anaya 40-yard field goal (Drive: 11 plays, 42 yards, 5:29; Georgia Tech 14-10)
- (02:37) BGSU – Finn Hogan 14-yard pass from Connor Bazelak (Alan Anaya kick) (Drive: 10 plays, 40 yards, 4:42; Bowling Green 17-14)

Third quarter

- (11:33) BGSU – Connor Bazelak 1-yard run (Alan Anaya kick) (Drive: 7 plays, 75 yards, 3:27; Bowling Green 24-14)
- (03:13) BGSU – Terion Stewart 6-yard run (Alan Anaya kick) (Drive: 10 plays, 86 yards, 5:06; Bowling Green 31-14)
- (02:28) BGSU – Deshawn Jones Jr. 45-yard interception return (Alan Anaya kick) (Bowling Green 38-14)
- (00:25) GT – Malik Rutherford 15-yard pass from Haynes King (King pass failed) (Drive: 8 plays, 81 yards, 1:58; Bowling Green 38-20)

Fourth quarter

- (01:35) GT – Abdul Janneh 16-yard pass from Haynes King (Aidan Birr kick) (Drive: 10 plays, 65 yards, 2:26; Bowling Green 38-27)

Statistics	Bowling Green	Georgia Tech
First downs	26	27
Plays–yards	438	417
Rushes–yards	45–175	32–69
Passing yards	263	348
Passing: comp–att–int	21–33–0	23–37–2
Time of possession	42:45	17:15

Team	Category	Player	Statistics
Bowling Green	Passing	Connor Bazelak	21/32, 263 yards, 1 TD
Bowling Green	Rushing	Terion Stewart	26 carries, 138 yards, 1 TD
Bowling Green	Receiving	Finn Hogan	6 receptions, 102 yards, 1 TD
Georgia Tech	Passing	Haynes King	23/37, 348 yards, 4 TDS, 2 INTS
Georgia Tech	Rushing	Haynes King	10 carries, 28 yards
Georgia Tech	Receiving	Dominick Blaylock	7 receptions, 131 yards

=== at No. 17 Miami (FL) ===
Game Six – Georgia Tech Yellow Jackets (2–3) at No. 17 Miami Hurricanes (4–0) – Game summary

Quarter	1	2	3	4	Total
Georgia Tech	0	0	14	9	23
No. 17 Miami (FL)	0	3	7	10	20

at Hard Rock Stadium • Miami Gardens, Florida

- Date: Saturday, October 7, 2023
- Game time: 8:00 p.m. EST
- Game weather: Clear • Temperature: 82 °F (28 °C)
- TV announcers (ACCN): Wes Durham (play-by-play) and Tim Hasselbeck (analyst)

Game information

First quarter

- No scoring plays

Second quarter

- (0:00) MIA – Andres Borregales 30-yard field goal (Drive: 12 plays, 65 yards, 1:22; Miami 3–0)

Third quarter

- (6:37) MIA – Riley Williams 22-yard pass from Tyler Van Dyke, Andres Borregales kick (Drive: 8 plays, 50 yards, 3:59; Miami 10–0)
- (3:19) GT – Haynes King 6-yard run, Aidan Birr kick (Drive: 8 plays, 75 yards, 3:18; Miami 10–7)
- (1:09) GT – Jamal Haynes 4-yard run, Aidan Birr kick (Drive: 4 plays, 26 yards, 1:26; Georgia Tech 14–10)

Fourth quarter

- (12:11) GT – Aidan Birr 27-yard field goal (Drive: 4 plays, 6 yards, 2:03; Georgia Tech 17–10)
- (10:15) MIA – Colbie Young 60-yard pass from Tyler Van Dyke, Andres Borregales kick (Drive: 4 plays, 75 yards, 1:56; Tied 17–17)
- (6:23) MIA – Andres Borregales 39-yard field goal (Drive: 4 plays, -7 yards, 1:59; Miami 20–17)
- (0:01) GT – Christian Leary 44-yard pass from Haynes King, two–point conversion failed (Drive: 4 plays, 74 yards, 0:25; Georgia Tech 23–20)

Statistics	GT	MIA
First downs	12	23
Plays–yards	53–250	82–454
Rushes–yards	27–99	46–166
Passing yards	151	288
Passing: comp–att–int	12–26–2	24–36–3
Time of possession	24:34	35:26

Team	Category	Player	Statistics
Georgia Tech	Passing	Haynes King	12/26, 151 yards, 1 TD, 2 INT
Georgia Tech	Rushing	Haynes King	10 carries, 46 yards, TD
Georgia Tech	Receiving	Christian Leary	1 reception, 44 yards, TD
Miami	Passing	Tyler Van Dyke	24/36, 288 yards, TD, 3 INT
Miami	Rushing	Donald Chaney Jr.	23 carries, 103 yards
Miami	Receiving	Xavier Restrepo	11 receptions, 139 yards

=== Boston College ===
Game Seven – Boston College Eagles (3–3) at Georgia Tech Yellow Jackets (3–3) – Game summary

Quarter	1	2	3	4	Total
Boston College	10	7	0	21	38
Georgia Tech	7	3	13	0	23

at Bobby Dodd Stadium • Atlanta, Georgia

- Date: Saturday, October 21, 2023
- Game time: 12:00 p.m. EDT
- Game weather: Sunny, 65 °F (18 °C) • Wind: SE 6 mph (9.7 km/h)
- Game attendance: 35,656
- Referee: Tim Hedgepeth
- TV announcers (ACCN): Chris Cotter, Mark Herzlich & Sherree Burruss

Game information

First quarter

- (08:51) BC – Liam Connor 24-yard field goal (Drive: 7 plays, 82 yards, 2:11; Boston College 3-0)
- (03:49) GT – Jamal Haynes 16-yard run (Aidan Birr kick) (Drive: 10 plays, 69 yards, 4:56; Georgia Tech 7-3)
- (01:42) BC – Amari Jackson 30-yard interception return (Liam Connor kick) (Drive: 0:35; Boston College 10-7)

Second quarter

- (06:02) GT – Aidan Birr 46-yard field goal (Drive: 10 plays, 61 yards, 4:22; Tied 10-10)
- (00:52) BC – Thomas Castellanos 12-yard run (Liam Connor kick) (Drive: 13 plays, 74 yards, 5:10; Boston College 17-10)

Third quarter

- (12:06) GT – Haynes King 71-yard run (Aidan Birr kick) (Drive: 3 plays, 80 yards, 1:18; Tied 17-17)
- (02:08) GT – Avery Boyd 19-yard pass from Haynes King (Aidan Birr kick missed) (Drive: 8 plays, 89 yards, 3:26; Georgia Tech 23-17)

Fourth quarter

- (14:24) BC – Kye Robichaux 2-yard run (Liam Connor kick) (Drive: 6 plays, 72 yards, 2:38; Boston College 24-23)
- (08:44) BC – Thomas Castellanos 43-yard run (Liam Connor kick) (Drive: 7 plays, 72 yards, 3:09; Boston College 31-23)
- (07:24) BC – Kye Robichaux 3-yard run (Liam Connor kick) (Drive: 2 plays, 60 yards, 0:30; Boston College 38-23)

Statistics	Boston College	Georgia Tech
First downs	24	23
Plays–yards	438	452
Rushes–yards	43–308	35–248
Passing yards	563	204
Passing: comp–att–int	17–29–1	14–32–3
Time of possession	33:48	26:12

Team	Category	Player	Statistics
Boston College Eagles	Passing	Thomas Castellanos	17/29, 255 yards, INT
Boston College Eagles	Rushing	Kye Robichaux	21 carries, 165 yards, 2 TD
Boston College Eagles	Receiving	Lewis Bond	8 receptions, 72 yards
Georgia Tech	Passing	Haynes King	14/32, 204 yards, TD, 3 INT
Georgia Tech	Rushing	Haynes King	10 carries, 150 yards, TD
Georgia Tech	Receiving	Christian Leary	10 receptions, 54 yards

=== No. 17 North Carolina ===
	1	2	3	4	Total
No. 17 Tar Heels	14	14	7	7	42
Yellow Jackets	0	22	0	24	46

=== at Clemson (rivalry) ===
Georgia Tech Yellow Jackets at Clemson Tigers − Game summary

Quarter	1	2	3	4	Total
Georgia Tech	7	0	0	14	21
Clemson	0	21	7	14	42

at Memorial Stadium • Clemson, SC

- Date: November 11, 2023
- Game time: 12:00 p.m.
- Game weather: Temperature: 51 °F (11 °C) • Wind: NE @ 9 mph (14 km/h) • Weather: Cloudy
- Game attendance: 81,426
- Referee: Stuart Mullins
- TV announcers (ABC): Mark Jones (play-by-play), Louis Riddick (analyst), Quint Kessenich (sideline)

Game information

First quarter

- (6:36) Georgia Tech – Haynes King 4 yard rush, Aidan Birr kick (Drive: 4 plays, 25 yards, 2:12; Georgia Tech 7–0)

Second quarter

- (11:45) Clemson – Beaux Collins 5 yard pass from Cade Klubnik, Johnathan Weitz kick, (Drive: 18 plays, 75 yards, 9:51; Tied 7–7)
- (7:17) Clemson – Tyler Brown 3 yard pass from Klubnik, Weitz kick, (Drive: 8 plays, 42 yards, 3:12; Clemson 14–7)
- (1:09) Clemson – Will Shipley 32 yard rush, Weitz kick, (Drive: 9 plays, 92 yards, 4:10; Clemson 21–7)

Third quarter

- (7:05) Clemson – Jake Briningstool 5 yard pass from Klubnik, Weitz kick, (Drive: 7 plays, 52 yards, 3:33; Clemson 28–7)

Fourth quarter

- (14:22) Clemson – Josh Sapp 13 yard pass from Klubnik, Weitz kick, (Drive: 5 plays, 31 yards, 0:33; Clemson 35–7)
- (12:46) Clemson – Shelton Lewis 46 yard interception return, Weitz kick, (Drive: 1 play, 46 yards, 1:36; Clemson 42–7)
- (10:11) Georgia Tech – Donte Smith 32 yard pass from King, Birr kick, (Drive: 7 plays, 75 yards, 2:35; Clemson 42–12)
- (1:49) Georgia Tech – Dylan Leonard 4 yard pass from King, Birr kick, (Drive: 14 plays, 67 yards, 4:12; Clemson 42–21)

Top passers

- CLEM – Cade Klubnik: 23–34, 205 yards, 4 TDs, 1 INT
- GT – Haynes King: 13–31, 129 yards, 2 TDs, 4 INTs

Top rushers

- CLEM – Phil Mafah: 17 rushes, 96 yards
- GT – Jamal Haynes: 15 rushes, 104 yards

Top Receiving

- CLEM – Beaux Collins: 5 receptions, 65 yards, 1 TD
- GT – Donte Smith: 2 receptions 30 yards, 1 TD

=== Syracuse ===
	1	2	3	4	Total
Orange	3	0	13	6	22
Yellow Jackets	7	10	7	7	31

=== No. 1 Georgia (rivalry) ===
Game Twelve– Georgia Bulldogs at Georgia Tech Yellow Jackets – Game summary

Quarter	1	2	3	4	Total
Georgia	7	14	10	0	31
Georgia Tech	10	3	0	10	23

at Bobby Dodd Stadium • Atlanta, Georgia

- Date: Saturday, November 25, 2023
- Game time: 7:00 p.m. EST
- Game attendance: 51,447
- TV: ABC

Game information

First quarter

- (11:35) Haynes King 9-yard Run (Aidan Birr Kick) (Drive: 4 plays, 37 yards, 2:07; Georgia Tech 7-0)
- (7:23) Dominic Lovett 29-yard pass from Carson Beck (Peyton Woodring Kick) (Drive: 9 plays, 83 yards, 4:09; Tied 7-7)
- (0:35) Aidan Birr 25-yard Field Goal (Drive: 11 plays, 67 yards, 6:48; Georgia Tech 10-7)

Second Quarter

- (12:40) Kendall Milton 3-yard Run (Peyton Woodring Kick) (Drive: 7 plays, 75 yards, 2:55; Georgia 14-10)
- (6:06) Aidan Birr 45-yard Field Goal (Drive: 12 plays, 47 yards, 6:34; Georgia 14-13)
- (1:13) Daijun Edwards 3-yard Run (Peyton Woodring Kick) (Drive: 11 plays, 64 yards, 4:46; Georgia 21-13)

Third Quarter

- (5:15) Peyton Woodring 39-yardd Field Goal (Drive: 10 plays, 65 yards, 5:45; Georgia 24-13)
- (0:31) Kendall Milton 4-yard Run (Peyton Woodring Kick) (Drive: 5 plays, 55 yards, 2:25; Georgia 31-13)

Fourth Quarter

- (12:13) Aidan Birr 40-yard Field Goal (Drive: 6 plays, 52 yards, 3:18; Georgia 31-16)
- (3:46) Haynes King 5-yard Run (Aidan Birr Kick) (Drive: 10 plays, 80 yards, 4:38; Georgia 31-23)

Statistics	UGA	GT
First downs	24	22
Total yards	437	363
Rushing yards	262	205
Passing yards	175	158
Passing: Comp–Att–Int	13-20	11-21
Time of possession	29:15	30:45

Team	Category	Player	Statistics
Georgia	Passing	Carson Beck	13/20, 175 yards, 1 TD, 1 INT
Georgia	Rushing	Kendall Milton	18 carries, 156 yards, 2 TD
Georgia	Receiving	Dominic Lovett	5 receptions, 68 yards, TD
Georgia Tech	Passing	Haynes King	11/20, 158 yards
Georgia Tech	Rushing	Jamal Haynes	15 carries, 81 yards
Georgia Tech	Receiving	Eric Singleton, Jr.	4 receptions, 96 yards

=== vs. UCF (Gasparilla Bowl) ===
2023 Union Home Mortgage Gasparilla Bowl

Quarter	1	2	3	4	Total
Georgia Tech	0	17	3	10	30
UCF	14	3	0	0	17

at Raymond James Stadium • Tampa, Florida

- Date: Friday, December 22, 2023
- Game time: 6:30 p.m. EST
- Game weather: Clear • Temperature: 66 °F (19 °C) • Wind: 6 mph (9.7 km/h) NE
- Game attendance: 30,281
- Referee: Cravonne Barrett
- TV announcers (ESPN): Wes Durham (play-by-play), Tim Hasselbeck (analyst), and Taylor Tannebaum (sideline)
- Box score

Game information

First Quarter

- UCF: Javon Baker 23-yard touchdown pass from John Rhys Plumlee (Colton Boomer Kick), 13:37
- UCF: Kobe Hudson 17-yard touchdown pass from John Rhys Plumlee (Colton Boomer Kick), 6:26

Second Quarter

- GT: Aidan Birr 36-yard field goal, 14:17
- UCF: Colton Boomer 27-yard field goal, 8:23
- GT: Haynes King 5-yard touchdown run (Aidan Birr Kick), 4:23
- GT: Malik Rutherford 41-yard touchdown pass from Haynes King (Aidan Birr Kick), 0:56

Third Quarter

- GT: Aidan Birr 29-yard field goal, 12:07

Fourth Quarter

- GT: Dontae Smith 1-yard touchdown run (Aidan Birr Kick), 13:37
- GT: Aidan Birr 38-yard field goal, 4:52

Win Probability

- GT 33.4%

Line

- GT +4.5

Over/Under

- 64.5

Statistics	GT	UCF
First downs	21	19
Plays–yards	69–371	69–424
Rushes–yards	53–284	34–169
Passing yards	87	255
Passing: comp–att–int	7–13–1	17–33–1
Time of possession	33:30	26:30

Team	Category	Player	Statistics
Georgia Tech	Passing	Haynes King	7/13, 87 yards, 1 TD, 1 INT
Georgia Tech	Rushing	Jamal Haynes	18 carries, 128 yards
Georgia Tech	Receiving	Malik Rutherford	2 receptions, 40 yards, 1 TD
UCF	Passing	John Rhys Plumlee	16/29, 198 yards, 2 TD
UCF	Rushing	RJ Harvey	15 carries, 120 yards
UCF	Receiving	Javon Baker	9 receptions, 173 yards, 1 TD
