= Brent Key =

American football player and coach (born 1978)

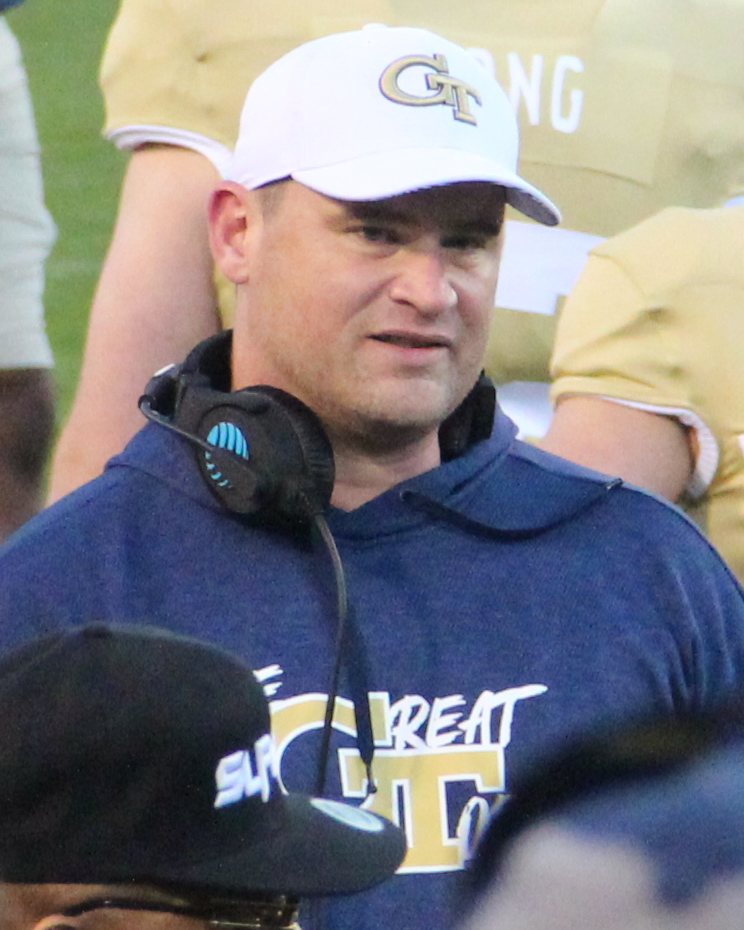
- Key in 2019

Current position
- Title: Head coach
- Team: Georgia Tech
- Conference: ACC
- Record: 30–28
- Annual salary: $4,150,000

Biographical details
- Born: August 1, 1978 (age 48); Birmingham, Alabama, U.S.

Playing career
- 1997–2000: Georgia Tech
- Position: Right guard

Coaching career (HC unless noted)
- 2001–2002: Georgia Tech (GA)
- 2004: Western Carolina (RB/TE)
- 2005: UCF (GA)
- 2006–2007: UCF (TE/RC)
- 2008: UCF (ST/TE/RC)
- 2009–2011: UCF (OL/RC)
- 2012–2013: UCF (AHC/OL/RC)
- 2014–2015: UCF (AHC/OC/OL/RC)
- 2016–2018: Alabama (OL)
- 2019–2022: Georgia Tech (AHC/OL/RGC)
- 2022: Georgia Tech (interim HC)
- 2023–present: Georgia Tech

Head coaching record
- Overall: 30–28
- Bowls: 1–2

Accomplishments and honors

Awards
- First-team All-ACC (2000); As an assistant coach: CFP national champion (2017)

Donald Brent Key (born August 1, 1978) is an American college football coach and former player. He is currently the head football coach at the Georgia Institute of Technology, his alma mater, which he has held the position of since 2022.

== Playing career ==
Key grew up in Trussville, Alabama, a suburb of Birmingham. He attended and played football at Hewitt-Trussville High School. Key played guard at Georgia Tech under coach George O'Leary, starting all four years. During his four-year playing career, Georgia Tech would go on to four straight bowl appearances, finish the season in the AP poll top-25 four times, beat rival Georgia three straight times, and rank No. 1 nationally in total offense in 1998. He was voted team captain and all-ACC as a senior in 2000.

== Coaching career ==
=== Early career ===
Key served as a graduate assistant under George O'Leary at Georgia Tech during the 2001 season. He would later join O'Leary at UCF. Key also served as tight ends and running backs coach at Western Carolina in 2004.

==== UCF ====
Key was hired in 2004 as a graduate assistant for UCF in 2005. At various points during his tenure with UCF, Key was the offensive coordinator, assistant head coach, offensive line coach, special teams coach, tight ends coach, and recruiting coordinator for the UCF Knights. After the 2012 season, Key was promoted to assistant head coach and then to offensive coordinator following the 2013 season. While as an assistant at the University of Central Florida (UCF), Key was selected to be the heir apparent to George O'Leary following his retirement. Following the 2013 season in which UCF won the Fiesta Bowl, Key reportedly declined the head coaching job at UAB to remain with the Knights. Key left UCF following their 0-12 2015 season, which would be O'Leary's last with the team. In 2012, 2013, 2014, and 2020 Key was nominated for the Broyles Award, given for the top assistant in college football.

==== Alabama ====
On February 15, 2016, Key was hired as the offensive line coach at the University of Alabama, replacing Mario Cristobal. Cristobal remained on staff as tight ends coach. Cam Robinson, Ross Pierschbacher, and Jonah Williams are a few of Key’s linemen who would go on to be named All-Americans during his tenure at Bama. Alabama would go on to win one national championship (2017) and two SEC championships (2016, 2018). During his tenure, Key was widely regarded as one of the top offensive line coaches in college football. Offensive lines coached by Key have been a finalist for the Joe Moore Award, presented annually to the top offensive line in the nation, three times in his career.

=== Georgia Tech ===
Key left Alabama for his alma mater Georgia Tech in 2019, serving as assistant head coach and offensive line coach under newly hired head coach Geoff Collins. Following a 10-28 record over 4 seasons, Collins was fired in early 2022 and Key was named interim head coach. He went 4–4 as interim head coach, with notable wins over #24 Pittsburgh and #13 North Carolina. On November 29, due to the team’s improvement during his tenure, Georgia Tech dropped the interim tag from Key's title and formally named him its 21st head football coach.

In 2023, Key led Georgia Tech to a 7-6 record, reaching its first bowl game and achieving its first winning season since 2018. This season was notable for a homecoming upset of #17 North Carolina and a last second victory over #17 Miami, in which Georgia Tech scored a touchdown with 2 seconds left in the game following former colleague Mario Cristobal's decision to not take a knee in the final 40 seconds of the 4th quarter.

Key began the 2024 season in Dublin, Ireland with an upset victory over the #10 Florida State Seminoles. Key and the Yellow Jackets started the season 2-0 for the first time since the 2016 season. After struggling with numerous injuries including quarterback Haynes King, running back Jamal Haynes, and linebacker Kyle Efford, the Jackets would later upset previously-undefeated #4 Miami at Bobby Dodd Stadium at homecoming. With the win over Miami, Georgia Tech became bowl eligible for two consecutive seasons for the first time since 2013-2014. The following week, in a thrilling Thursday night win over NC State in which backup quarterback Aaron Philo scored a go-ahead touchdown with 22 seconds left, Georgia Tech clinched back-to-back winning seasons for the first time since 2013-2014. In December 2024, Georgia Tech agreed to a five-year extension of Key's contract, extending his tenure as coach through 2029.

In 2025, the Yellow Jackets started 8-0, including wins at Colorado, at home over #12 Clemson via last-second field goal, and at eventual ACC champions Duke. Tech reached an AP Poll ranking as high as 7th, their best since 2009. Following this hot start, Key was rewarded with another extension through 2030, increasing his salary by $2m annually to $6.5 million per year. Key is currently 0-8 against the South Eastern Conference.

Personal life

Key earned his degree in management from Georgia Tech in 2001. During his time at UCF, he met his wife, Danielle, who worked on the marketing team for the university's athletic department. Together, they have a daughter named Harper.

== Head coaching record ==
Year	Team	Overall	Conference	Standing	Bowl/playoffs	Coaches^{#}	AP^{°}
Georgia Tech Yellow Jackets (Atlantic Coast Conference) (2022–present)
2022	Georgia Tech	4–4 (Note: Key replaced Geoff Collins after four games)	4–3	11th			
2023	Georgia Tech	7–6	5–3	T–4th	W Gasparilla		
2024	Georgia Tech	7–6	5–3	6th	L Birmingham		
2025	Georgia Tech	9–4	6–2	6th	L Pop-Tarts		
2026	Georgia Tech	3–8	2–6	17th			
Georgia Tech:		30–28	22–17				
Total:		30–28					
National championship Conference title Conference division title or championship game berth
