= Union Christian Academy =

Location
- 4201 Windsor Drive; Fort Smith, Arkansas 72904; United States
- Coordinates: 35°24′3″N 94°23′5″W

Information
- Type: Private
- Established: 2005 (21 years ago)
- Status: Open
- CEEB code: 040814
- NCES School ID: 00048337
- Teaching staff: 11.5 (on FTE basis)
- Grades: PK–4 (Elementary); 5–12 (Middle, Jr./Sr. High)
- Enrollment: 315 (2023-24)
- Student to teacher ratio: 7.0
- Classes offered: Regular, Advanced Placement
- Campus type: Suburban
- Colors: Navy blue, silver, white
- Athletics: Football, Volleyball, Basketball, Tennis, Baseball, Softball, Track & Field
- Athletics conference: 2A-4 West
- Mascot: Eagle
- Nickname: Eagles
- Team name: Union Christian Academy
- Accreditation: ACSI, ANSAA, AdvancED (2003–)
- Affiliation: Oklahoma Christian School Athletic Association
- Website: www.unioneagles.org

Union Christian Academy (UCA) is a private Christian school serving students in prekindergarten through grade 12 in Fort Smith, Arkansas, United States.

It was founded in 2005 as a result of a merger of the former Harvest Time Christian School, Fort Smith Christian School and River Valley Christian School. For the 2014-15 school year, Union Christian serves more than 300 students in prekindergarten through 12th grade at its school campus located at 4201 Windsor Dr in Fort Smith.

== Academics ==
Union Christian Academy is accredited by AdvancED since 2003 and is accredited by the Association of Christian Schools International (ACSI), Arkansas Nonpublic School Accrediting Association (ANSAA).

== Extracurricular activities ==
The Union Christian Academy mascot for academic and athletic teams is the Eagle with the school colors of blue and white.

=== Athletics ===
The Union Eagles participate in various interscholastic activities in the Oklahoma Christian School Athletic Association. Union Christian left the Arkansas Activities Association 2016 to join the OCSAA. The Eagles school athletic activities include 8-man football, volleyball, competitive cheer, basketball (boys/girls), baseball, softball, tennis (boys/girls), and track and field (boys/girls).

Union Christian Academy and the former Fort Smith Christian High School won numerous state championships including:

- Golf: The boys golf team won a state golf championship in 2000.
- Tennis: The boys tennis team won a 4A state championship in 2007 and three consecutive 2A class state tennis championships in 2008, 2009 and 2010. The girls team were crowned the 2A class state tennis champions in 2009.
- Track and field: The boys track team won five state track and field championships (1998, 2000, 2001, 2002, 2006). The girls team equally have won four state track titles (1993, 1994, 1995, 2006).
- Football: The Union Christian Academy football team won their first football state championship in the HCAA(2A) during the 2019 season.

== Notable alumni ==
- Shay Mooney (2009) — Member of Grammy-winning country group Dan & Shay
- Hal R. Smith (1949) — MLB player
- Gus Malzahn (1984) — Former American college football coach and player
- Craig Gentry (2002) — MLB player, Texas Rangers.
