= Tre'Mon Morris-Brash =

American football player (born 2000)

Profile
- Position: Linebacker

Personal information
- Born: September 29, 2000 (age 26); Richmond, Virginia, U.S.
- Listed height: 6 ft 2 in (1.88 m)
- Listed weight: 246 lb (112 kg)

Career information
- High school: St. John's College (Washington, D.C.)
- College: UCF (2019–2023)
- NFL draft: 2024: undrafted

Career history
- Los Angeles Chargers (2024)*; Calgary Stampeders (2026)
- * Offseason or practice squad member only

Awards and highlights
- First-team All-Big 12 (2023); First-team All-AAC (2022)
- Stats at Pro Football Reference

Tre'Mon Morris-Brash (born September 29, 2000) is an American professional football linebacker. He played college football for the UCF Knights.

== Early life ==
Morris-Brash attended high school at St. John's College in Washington, D.C.. Coming out of high school, Morris-Brash was rated as a three-star recruit, where he committed to play college football for the UCF Knights.

== College career ==
During Morris-Brash's five-year career from 2019 to 2023, he appeared in 61 games for the Knights, where he totaled 182 tackles with 59 being for a loss, 26 sacks, six pass deflections, an interception, two forced fumbles, four fumble recoveries, and a touchdown while being named First team all American Athletic Conference in 2022, and first team all Big-12 Conference in 2023.

== Professional career ==
Pre-draft measurables
Height	Weight	Arm length	Hand span	Wingspan	40-yard dash	10-yard split	20-yard split	20-yard shuttle	Three-cone drill	Vertical jump	Broad jump
6 ft 2 5/8 in (1.90 m)	246 lb (112 kg)	32 1/2 in (0.83 m)	8 3/4 in (0.22 m)	6 ft 7 in (2.01 m)	4.98 s	1.72 s	2.90 s	4.49 s	7.41 s	29.5 in (0.75 m)	9 ft 7 in (2.92 m)
All values from Pro Day

=== Los Angeles Rams ===
After not being selected in the 2024 NFL draft, Morris-Brash signed with the Los Angeles Chargers as an undrafted free agent. On August 27, 2024, Morris-Brash was released during final roster cuts and signed to the team's practice squad the following day. He signed a reserve/future contract on January 13, 2025.

On August 26, 2025, Morris-Brash was released during final roster cuts.

=== Calgary Stampeders ===
On January 26, 2026, Morris-Brash signed with the Calgary Stampeders of the Canadian Football League (CFL). He was released on June 23.
