= Jamal Haynes =

American football player (born 2002)

Profile
- Position: Running back

Personal information
- Born: October 5, 2002 (age 24)
- Listed height: 5 ft 7 in (1.70 m)
- Listed weight: 195 lb (88 kg)

Career information
- High school: Grayson (Loganville, Georgia)
- College: Georgia Tech (2021–2025)
- NFL draft: 2026: undrafted

Career history
- Cincinnati Bengals (2026)*
- * Offseason or practice squad member only

Awards and highlights
- Third team All-ACC (2023)
- Stats at Pro Football Reference

Jamal Alexander Haynes (born October 5, 2002) is an American professional football running back. He played college football for the Georgia Tech Yellow Jackets.

== Early life ==
Haynes attended Grayson High School in Loganville, Georgia. He was rated as a three-star recruit and committed to play college football for the Georgia Tech Yellow Jackets.

== College career ==
In Haynes first two seasons in 2021 and 2022, he appeared in 11 games primarily as a wide receiver, where he recorded no statistics. Going into the 2023 season, he was converted to a running back. In the 2023 Gasparilla Bowl, Haynes rushed for a career-high 128 yards in a win over UCF. Haynes finished the 2023 season with 1,059 rushing yards and seven touchdowns and 20 receptions for 151 yards and a touchdown, while also returning two kickoffs for 47 yards, en route to being named third-team all-ACC. Ahead of the 2024 season, he was named to multiple preseason award watchlists such as the Paul Hornung watch list, the Walter Camp Player of the Year watch list, and to the Maxwell Award watch list.

== Professional career ==
Pre-draft measurables
| Height | Weight | Arm length | Hand span | Wingspan | 40-yard dash | 10-yard split | 20-yard split | 20-yard shuttle | Three-cone drill | Vertical jump | Broad jump | Bench press |
|---|---|---|---|---|---|---|---|---|---|---|---|---|
| 5 ft 6 7/8 in (1.70 m) | 195 lb (88 kg) | 28 1/8 in (0.71 m) | 8 5/8 in (0.22 m) | 5 ft 8 7/8 in (1.75 m) | 4.52 s | 1.45 s | 2.53 s | 4.28 s | 7.15 s | 36.0 in (0.91 m) | 10 ft 1 in (3.07 m) | 21 reps |
All values from Pro Day

On May 8, 2026, Haynes signed with the Cincinnati Bengals as an undrafted free agent. On August 30, he was waived by the Bengals as a part of final roster cuts.
