= Javon Baker =

American football player (born 2002)

Profile
- Position: Wide receiver

Personal information
- Born: February 18, 2002 (age 24); Atlanta, Georgia, U.S.
- Listed height: 6 ft 1 in (1.85 m)
- Listed weight: 202 lb (92 kg)

Career information
- High school: McEachern (Powder Springs, Georgia)
- College: Alabama (2020–2021); UCF (2022–2023)
- NFL draft: 2024: 4th round, 110th overall pick

Career history
- New England Patriots (2024); Philadelphia Eagles (2025)*; San Francisco 49ers (2025)*
- * Offseason or practice squad member only

Awards and highlights
- CFP national champion (2020); First-team All-Big 12 (2023)

Career NFL statistics as of 2025
- Receptions: 1
- Receiving yards: 12
- Stats at Pro Football Reference

Javon Baker (born February 18, 2002) is an American professional football wide receiver. He has previously played in the NFL for the New England Patriots and the Philadelphia Eagles. He played college football for the Alabama Crimson Tide and UCF Knights.

== Early life ==
Baker attended McEachern High School in Powder Springs, Georgia. He had 58 receptions for 629 yards and 11 touchdowns as a senior and had 1,105 receiving yards and eight touchdowns as a junior. He was selected to play in the 2020 All-American Bowl. Baker committed to the University of Alabama to play college football.

== College career ==
Baker played at Alabama in 2020 and 2021. Over 21 games in two seasons he had nine receptions for 116 yards and one touchdown. After the 2021 season, Baker entered the transfer portal. He originally committed to transfer to the University of Kentucky before switching to the University of Central Florida (UCF). In his first season at UCF in 2022, Baker started 13 of 14 games and had 56 receptions for 796 yards and five touchdowns. As a senior in 2023, he was named first team All-Big 12 after recording 52 receptions for 1,139 yards and seven touchdowns. After the season, Baker entered the 2024 NFL draft.

== Professional career ==
Pre-draft measurables
Height	Weight	Arm length	Hand span	Wingspan	40-yard dash	10-yard split	20-yard split	Vertical jump	Broad jump
6 ft 1 1/4 in (1.86 m)	202 lb (92 kg)	32 1/4 in (0.82 m)	9 5/8 in (0.24 m)	6 ft 6 1/4 in (1.99 m)	4.54 s	1.58 s	2.65 s	37.0 in (0.94 m)	10 ft 1 in (3.07 m)
All values from NFL Combine

=== New England Patriots ===
Baker was selected by the New England Patriots with the 110th overall pick in the fourth round of the 2024 NFL draft. He signed his rookie contract on May 24, 2024. In his rookie season, Baker played In 11 games (one start), recording one reception for 12 yards.

He was released on August 27, 2025 after initially surviving final roster cuts.

=== Philadelphia Eagles ===
On August 29, 2025, Baker signed with the practice squad of the Philadelphia Eagles. Baker was released by the Eagles on October 14.

=== San Francisco 49ers ===
On December 9, 2025, Baker signed with the San Francisco 49ers' practice squad. He was released on January 14, 2026.

== Legal issues ==
On September 1, 2024, Baker was given a ticket by the Massachusetts State Police following his refusal to move his vehicle that was blocking traffic at Logan Airport. The incident was made public when Baker posted on his Instagram account a video describing the event. Baker was disciplined by Patriot head coach Jerod Mayo after the video surfaced. The details of the discipline were not made public.
