= 2024 VMI Keydets football team =

American college football season

2024 VMI Keydets football
- Conference: Southern Conference
- Record: 1–11 (1–7 SoCon)
- Head coach: Danny Rocco (2nd season)
- Offensive coordinator: Patrick Ashford (3rd season)
- Offensive scheme: Pro-style
- Defensive coordinator: Rich Yahner (2nd season)
- Base defense: 3–3–5
- Home stadium: Alumni Memorial Field

2024 Southern Conference football standings
	Conf.			Overall
Team	W		L	W		L
No. 8 Mercer $^	7	–	1	11	–	3
Western Carolina	6	–	2	7	–	5
Chattanooga	5	–	3	7	–	5
East Tennessee State	5	–	3	7	–	5
Samford	3	–	4	4	–	7
The Citadel	3	–	5	5	–	7
Wofford	3	–	5	5	–	7
Furman	2	–	5	3	–	8
VMI	1	–	7	1	–	11
$ – Conference champion; ^ – FCS playoff participant; Rankings from STATS Poll

The 2024 VMI Keydets football team represented the Virginia Military Institute as a member of the Southern Conference (SoCon) during the 2024 NCAA Division I FCS football season. The Keydets were coached by second-year head coach Danny Rocco and played at Alumni Memorial Field in Lexington, Virginia.

== Schedule ==
Date	Time	Opponent	Site	TV	Result	Attendance
August 29	7:00 p.m.	at No. 15 William & Mary*	Zable Stadium; Williamsburg, VA (rivalry)	FloSports	L 7–41	8,096
September 7	1:30 p.m.	Bucknell*	Alumni Memorial Field; Lexington, VA	ESPN+	L 28–35	6,295
September 14	3:30 p.m.	at Georgia Tech*	Bobby Dodd Stadium; Atlanta, GA	ACCNX/ESPN+	L 7–59	31,729
September 21	1:30 p.m.	Norfolk State*	Alumni Memorial Field; Lexington, VA	ESPN+	L 10–32	3,108
October 5	3:00 p.m.	at Samford	Pete Hanna Stadium; Homewood, AL	ESPN+	L 3–27	3,617
October 12	1:30 p.m.	at Wofford	Gibbs Stadium; Spartanburg, SC	ESPN+	L 16–31	4,248
October 19	1:30 p.m.	The Citadel	Alumni Memorial Field; Lexington, VA (Military Classic of the South)	ESPN+	L 10–13	8,277
October 26	4:00 p.m.	at No. 19 Chattanooga	Finley Stadium; Chattanooga, TN	ESPN+	L 10–31	8,071
November 2	1:30 p.m.	Furman	Alumni Memorial Field; Lexington, VA	ESPN+	W 21–17	4,012
November 9	1:30 p.m.	No. 10 Mercer	Alumni Memorial Field; Lexington, VA	ESPN+	L 0–34	3,580
November 16	1:00 p.m.	at Western Carolina	Bob Waters Field at E. J. Whitmire Stadium; Cullowhee, NC	ESPN+	L 28–58	13,022
November 23	12:00 p.m.	East Tennessee State	Alumni Memorial Field; Lexington, VA	ESPN+	L 9–16	3,825
*Non-conference game; Rankings from STATS Poll released prior to the game; All times are in Eastern time

== Game summaries ==
=== at No. 15 William & Mary (rivalry) ===
Game One – VMI Keydets (0–0) at No. 15 William & Mary Tribe (0–0) – Game summary

Quarter	1	2	3	4	Total
Keydets	0	7	0	0	7
No. 15 Tribe	14	14	13	0	41

at Zable Stadium • Williamsburg, VA

- Date: Thursday August 29, 2024
- Game time: 7:00 p.m.
- Game weather: Sunny, 86 °F (30 °C)
- Game attendance: 8,096
- Referee: Todd Bowman
- TV announcers (FloSports): TBD

Game information

First quarter

- (10:00) W&M – Bronson Yoder 1-yard run, Eric Bernstein kick (Drive: 11 plays, 69 yards, 5:00; William & Mary 7–0)
- (3:00) W&M – Malachi Imoh 1-yard run, Eric Bernstein kick (Drive: 6 plays, 66 yards, 2:46; William & Mary 14–0)

Second quarter

- (7:25) W&M – Clayton Dobler 18-yard punt return, Eric Bernstein kick (William & Mary 21–0)
- (2:16) VMI – Hunter Rice 12-yard run, Caden Beck kick (Drive: 9 plays, 75 yards, 5:09; William & Mary 21–7)
- (0:14) W&M – Hollis Mathis 4-yard run, Eric Bernstein kick (Drive: 7 plays, 73 yards, 2:02; William & Mary 28–7)

Third quarter

- (9:55) W&M – Hollis Mathis 26-yard pass from Darius Wilson, Eric Bernstein kick (Drive: 5 plays, 61 yards, 2:35; William & Mary 35–7)
- (2:59) W&M – Sean McElwain 1-yard pass from Darius Wilson (Drive: 9 plays, 61 yards, 5:20; William & Mary 41–7)

Fourth quarter

No scoring

Statistics	VMI	W&M
First downs	14	21
Total yards	241	446
Rushing yards	145	205
Passing yards	96	241
Passing: Comp–Att–Int	12–25–2	15–20–0
Time of possession	32:04	27:56

Team	Category	Player	Statistics
VMI	Passing	Collin Shannon	8/19, 62 yards, INT
VMI	Rushing	Hunter Rice	17 carries, 81 yards, TD
VMI	Receiving	Hunter Rice	1 reception, 29 yards
William & Mary	Passing	Darius Wilson	11/15, 190 yards, 2 TD
William & Mary	Rushing	Bronson Yoder	10 carries, 54 yards, TD
William & Mary	Receiving	Hollis Mathis	2 receptions, 71 yards, TD

=== vs. Bucknell ===
Game Two – Bucknell Bison (0–1) vs VMI Keydets (0–1) – Game summary

Quarter	1	2	3	4	Total
Bison	7	7	14	7	35
Keydets	7	7	0	14	28

at Alumni Memorial Field, Lexington, Virginia

- Date: Saturday September 7, 2024
- Game time: 1:30 PM
- Game weather: Sunny, 73 °F (23 °C)
- Game attendance: 6,295
- Referee: Brian Hilpisch
- TV: ESPN+

Game information

First quarter

- (8:04) VMI – Asa Locks 48-yard interception, Caden Beck kick (VMI 7–0)
- (2:29) BUC – TJ Cadden 40-yard punt return, Matt Schearer kick (Tied 7–7)

Second quarter

- (9:22) BUC – Paul Neel 2-yard run, Matt Schearer kick (Drive: 12 plays, 65 yards, 6:04; Bucknell 14–7)
- (4:55) VMI – Hunter Rice 58-yard run, Caden Beck kick (Drive: 4 plays, 69 yards, 1:03; Tied 14–14)

Third quarter

- (11:35) BUC – Josh Gary 10-yard pass from Ralph Rucker IV, Matt Schearer kick (Drive: 8 plays, 81 yards, 3:25; Bucknell 21–14)
- (6:35) BUC – Josh Gary 41-yard pass from Ralph Rucker IV, Matt Schearer kick (Drive: 5 plays, 61 yards, 2:20; Bucknell 28–14)

Fourth quarter

- (12:14) BUC – TJ Cadden 35-yard pass from Ralph Rucker IV, Matt Schearer kick (Drive: 7 plays, 79 yards, 3:23; Bucknell 35–14)
- (8:13) VMI – Hunter Rice 2-yard run, Caden Beck kick (Drive: 8 plays, 75 yards, 4:01; Bucknell 35–21)
- (0:29) VMI – Ryan von Brandt 17-yard pass from Chandler Wilson, Caden Beck kick (Drive: 8 plays, 80 yards, 2:25; Bucknell 35–28)

Statistics	BUCK	VMI
First downs	22	20
Total yards	451	378
Rushing yards	111	212
Passing yards	340	166
Passing: Comp–Att–Int	28–37–1	24–37–1
Time of possession	29:14	30:46

Team	Category	Player	Statistics
Bucknell	Passing	Ralph Rucker IV	28/37, 340 yards, 3 TD, INT
Bucknell	Rushing	Paul Neel	8 carries, 37 yards, TD
Bucknell	Receiving	Eric Weatherly	9 receptions, 105 yards
VMI	Passing	Collin Shannon	21/32, 129 yards, INT
VMI	Rushing	Hunter Rice	18 carries, 166 yards, 2 TD
VMI	Receiving	Ivan Thorpe	6 receptions, 47 yards

=== at Georgia Tech (FBS) ===
Game Three – VMI Keydets (0–2) vs Georgia Tech Yellow Jackets (FBS) (2–1) – Game summary

Quarter	1	2	3	4	Total
Keydets	0	0	0	7	7
Yellow Jackets (FBS)	17	21	14	7	59

at Bobby Dodd Stadium, Atlanta, Georgia

- Date: Saturday September 14, 2024
- Game time: 3:30 PM
- Game weather: Rain, 76 °F (24 °C)
- Game attendance: 31,729
- Referee: Tim Hedgepeth
- TV announcers (ACCNX): Shawn Kenney (play-by-play) and Forrest Conoly (analyst)

Game information

First quarter

- (7:39) GT − Aidan Birr 28-yard field goal (Drive: 8 plays, 50 yards, 2:14; Georgia Tech 3-0)
- (4:52) GT – Malik Rutherford 35-yard pass from Haynes King, Aidan Birr kick (Drive: 2 plays, 50 yards, 0:41; Georgia Tech 10-0)
- (0:08) GT – Zach Pyron 1-yard run, Aidan Birr kick (Drive: 7 plays, 73 yards, 3:13; Georgia Tech 17-0)

Second quarter

- (11:04) GT – Zach Pyron 1-yard run, Aidan Birr kick (Drive: 6 plays, 55 yards, 2:41; Georgia Tech 24-0)
- (1:49) GT – Eric Singleton Jr. 14-yard pass from Haynes King, Aidan Birr kick (Drive: 4 plays, 42 yards, 1:10; Georgia Tech 31-0)
- (0:30) GT – Avery Boyd 14-yard pass from Haynes King, Aidan Birr kick (Drive: 5 plays, 73 yards, 0:53; Georgia Tech 38-0)

Third quarter

- (7:38) GT – Trelain Maddox 3-yard run, Aidan Birr kick (Drive: 5 plays, 60 yards, 2:17; Georgia Tech 45-0)
- (1:32) GT – Leo Blackburn 24-yard pass from Zach Pyron, Aidan Birr kick (Drive: 3 plays, 40 yards, 1:19; Georgia Tech 52-0)

Fourth quarter

- (6:37) VMI – Ethen Horne 2-yard pass from Brady Hammonds, Caden Beck kick (Drive: 10 plays, 75 yards, 9:55; Georgia Tech 52-7)
- (4:29) GT – Anthony Carrie 2-yard run, Aidan Birr kick (Drive: 7 plays, 65 yards, 2:05; Georgia Tech 59-7)

Statistics	VMI	GT
First downs	5	30
Total yards	104	572
Rushing yards	12	190
Passing yards	92	382
Passing: Comp–Att–Int	13-19-0	23-32-0
Time of possession	30:16	24:44

Team	Category	Player	Statistics
VMI	Passing	Chandler Wilson	10/15, 51 yards
VMI	Rushing	JoJo Crump	5 rushes, 16 yards
VMI	Receiving	Owen Sweeney	1 reception, 34 yards
Georgia Tech	Passing	Haynes King	17/22, 275 yards, 3 TD
Georgia Tech	Rushing	Trelain Maddox	9 rushes, 53 yards, TD
Georgia Tech	Receiving	Eric Singleton Jr.	5 receptions, 102 yards, TD

=== vs. Norfolk State ===
Game Four – Norfolk State Spartans (1–2) vs VMI Keydets (0–3) – Game summary

Quarter	1	2	3	4	Total
Spartans	0	0	0	0	0
Keydets	0	0	0	0	0

at Alumni Memorial Field, Lexington, Virginia

- Date: Saturday September 21, 2024
- Game time: 1:30 PM
- TV: ESPN+

Game information

First quarter
Second quarter
Third quarter
Fourth quarter

Statistics	NORF	VMI
First downs		
Total yards		
Rushing yards		
Passing yards		
Passing: Comp–Att–Int		
Time of possession		

Team	Category	Player	Statistics
Norfolk State	Passing		
Norfolk State	Rushing		
Norfolk State	Receiving		
VMI	Passing		
VMI	Rushing		
VMI	Receiving		

=== at Samford ===
Game Five – VMI Keydets (0–4) vs Samford Bulldogs (1–2) – Game summary

Quarter	1	2	3	4	Total
Keydets	0	0	0	0	0
Bulldogs	0	0	0	0	0

at Pete Hanna Stadium, Homewood, Alabama

- Date: Saturday October 5, 2024
- Game time: 3:00 PM
- TV: ESPN+

Game information

First quarter
Second quarter
Third quarter
Fourth quarter

Statistics	VMI	SAM
First downs		
Total yards		
Rushing yards		
Passing yards		
Passing: Comp–Att–Int		
Time of possession		

Team	Category	Player	Statistics
VMI	Passing		
VMI	Rushing		
VMI	Receiving		
Samford	Passing		
Samford	Rushing		
Samford	Receiving		

=== at Wofford ===
Game Six – VMI Keydets (0–5) vs Wofford Terriers (2–3) – Game summary

Quarter	1	2	3	4	Total
Keydets	0	0	0	0	0
Terriers	0	0	0	0	0

at Gibbs Stadium, Spartanburg, South Carolina

- Date: Saturday October 12, 2024
- Game time: 1:30 PM
- TV: ESPN+

Game information

First quarter
Second quarter
Third quarter
Fourth quarter

Statistics	VMI	WOF
First downs		
Total yards		
Rushing yards		
Passing yards		
Passing: Comp–Att–Int		
Time of possession		

Team	Category	Player	Statistics
VMI	Passing		
VMI	Rushing		
VMI	Receiving		
Wofford	Passing		
Wofford	Rushing		
Wofford	Receiving		

=== The Citadel (Military Classic of the South) ===
Game Seven – The Citadel Bulldogs (0–0) at VMI Keydets (0–0) – Game summary

Quarter	1	2	3	4	Total
Bulldogs	0	0	0	0	0
Keydets	0	0	0	0	0

at Alumni Memorial Field • Lexington, VA

- Date: Saturday October 19, 2024
- Game time: 1:30 p.m.
- Game weather: 0 °F (−18 °C)
- TV announcers (ESPN+): TBD

Game information

First quarter
Second quarter
Third quarter
Fourth quarter

Statistics	CIT	VMI
First downs		
Total yards		
Rushing yards		
Passing yards		
Passing: Comp–Att–Int		
Time of possession		

Team	Category	Player	Statistics
The Citadel	Passing		
The Citadel	Rushing		
The Citadel	Receiving		
VMI	Passing		
VMI	Rushing		
VMI	Receiving		

=== at No. 19 Chattanooga ===
Game Eight – VMI Keydets (0–7) at No. 19 Chattanooga Mocs (4–3) – Game summary

Quarter	1	2	3	4	Total
Keydets	0	0	0	0	0
No. 19 Mocs	0	0	0	0	0

at Finley Stadium • Chattanooga, TN

- Date: Saturday October 26, 2024
- Game time: 4:00 p.m.
- Game weather: 0 °F (−18 °C)
- TV: ESPN+

Game information

First quarter
Second quarter
Third quarter
Fourth quarter

Statistics	VMI	UTC
First downs		
Total yards		
Rushing yards		
Passing yards		
Passing: Comp–Att–Int		
Time of possession		

Team	Category	Player	Statistics
VMI	Passing		
VMI	Rushing		
VMI	Receiving		
Chattanooga	Passing		
Chattanooga	Rushing		
Chattanooga	Receiving		

=== Furman ===
Game Nine – Furman Paladins (2–5) vs VMI Keydets (0–8) – Game summary

Quarter	1	2	3	4	Total
Paladins	7	3	7	0	17
Keydets	7	14	0	0	21

at Alumni Memorial Field • Lexington, VA

- Date: Saturday November 2, 2024
- Game time: 1:30 p.m.
- TV announcers (ESPN+): TBD

Game information

First quarter
Second quarter
Third quarter
Fourth quarter

Statistics	FUR	VMI
First downs		
Total yards		
Rushing yards		
Passing yards		
Passing: Comp–Att–Int		
Time of possession		

Team	Category	Player	Statistics
Furman	Passing		
Furman	Rushing		
Furman	Receiving		
VMI	Passing		
VMI	Rushing		
VMI	Receiving		

=== No. 10 Mercer ===
Game Ten – No. 10 Mercer Bears (8–1) vs VMI Keydets (1–8) – Game summary

Quarter	1	2	3	4	Total
No. 10 Bears	0	0	0	0	0
Keydets	0	0	0	0	0

at Alumni Memorial Field • Lexington, VA

- Date: Saturday November 9, 2024
- Game time: 1:30 p.m.
- TV announcers (ESPN+): TBD

Game information

First quarter
Second quarter
Third quarter
Fourth quarter

Statistics	MER	VMI
First downs		
Total yards		
Rushing yards		
Passing yards		
Passing: Comp–Att–Int		
Time of possession		

Team	Category	Player	Statistics
Mercer	Passing		
Mercer	Rushing		
Mercer	Receiving		
VMI	Passing		
VMI	Rushing		
VMI	Receiving		

=== at Western Carolina ===
Game Eleven – VMI Keydets (1–9) vs Western Carolina Catamounts (5–5) – Game summary

Quarter	1	2	3	4	Total
Keydets	0	0	0	0	0
Catamounts	0	0	0	0	0

at Bob Waters Field at E. J. Whitmire Stadium, Cullowhee, NC

- Date: Saturday November 16, 2024
- Game time: 1:00 p.m.
- TV: ESPN+

Game information

First quarter
Second quarter
Third quarter
Fourth quarter

Statistics	VMI	WCU
First downs		
Total yards		
Rushing yards		
Passing yards		
Passing: Comp–Att–Int		
Time of possession		

Team	Category	Player	Statistics
VMI	Passing		
VMI	Rushing		
VMI	Receiving		
Western Carolina	Passing		
Western Carolina	Rushing		
Western Carolina	Receiving		

=== East Tennessee State ===
Game Twelve – East Tennessee State Buccaneers (6–5) vs VMI Keydets (1–10) – Game summary

Quarter	1	2	3	4	Total
Buccaneers	3	10	3	0	16
Keydets	3	0	3	3	9

at Alumni Memorial Field • Lexington, VA

- Date: Saturday November 23, 2024
- Game time: 12:00 p.m.
- Game weather: Sunny • Temperature: 51 °F (11 °C) • Wind: W 16 mph
- Game attendance: 3,825
- Referee: Brian Holland
- TV announcers (ESPN+): Wade Branner, Chip Tarkenton, Guerin Austin

Game information

First quarter

- (11:28) VMI - Caden Beck 32-yard field goal (Drive: 9 plays, 57 yards, 3:27; VMI 3-0)
- (6:01) ETSU - Ewan Johnson 22-yard field goal (Drive: 9 plays, 50 yards, 2:10; Tied 3-3)

Second quarter

- (4:39) ETSU - Bryson Irby 1-yard run, Ewan Johnson kick (Drive: 6 plays, 17 yards, 2:26; East Tennessee State 10-3)
- (0:00) ETSU - Ewan Johnson 20-yard field goal (Drive: 8 plays, 54 yards, 0:52; East Tennessee State 13-3)

Third quarter

- (10:20) ETSU - Ewan Johnson 40-yard field goal (Drive: 11 plays, 49 yards, 4:33; East Tennesse State 16-3)
- (4:15) VMI - Caden Beck 48-yard field goal (Drive: 12 plays, 48 yards, 6:05; East Tennessee State 16-6)

Fourth quarter

- (12:08) VMI - Caden Beck 48-yard field goal (Drive: 9 plays, 36 yards, 4:20; East Tennessee State 16-9)

Statistics	ETSU	VMI
First downs	19	12
Total yards	314	264
Rushing yards	195	202
Passing yards	119	62
Passing: Comp–Att–Int	15-25-1	12-28-0
Time of possession	29:21	30:39

Team	Category	Player	Statistics
East Tennessee State	Passing	Baylor Hayes	15-25, 119 yards, INT
East Tennessee State	Rushing	Devontae Houston	18 carries, 104 yards
East Tennessee State	Receiving	Karim Page	4 receptions, 104 yards
VMI	Passing	JoJo Crump	10-28, 62 yards
VMI	Rushing	JoJo Crump	11 carries, 126 yards
VMI	Receiving	Morgan McPhaul	2 receptions, 19 yards
