= Zach Pyron =

American football player (born 2003)

No. 8
- Position: Quarterback

Personal information
- Born: September 1, 2003 (age 23)
- Listed height: 6 ft 3 in (1.91 m)
- Listed weight: 222 lb (101 kg)

Career information
- High school: Pinson Valley (Pinson, Alabama)
- College: Georgia Tech (2022–2024); South Alabama (2025)
- Stats at ESPN

Zachary Pyron (born September 1, 2003) is an American former college football quarterback for the Georgia Tech Yellow Jackets and South Alabama Jaguars.

== Early life ==
Pyron grew up in Fyffe, Alabama and attended Fyffe High School, leading the football team to win two Alabama 2A state titles. He transferred to Pinson Valley High School in Pinson, Alabama during his junior year. He led the team to win the 6A state championship in 2020 and to the quarterfinals in 2021. He earned a spot in the Elite 11 quarterback competition in 2021. He originally committed to play college football at Baylor, but later switched his commitment at Georgia Tech.

== College career ==
=== Georgia Tech ===
During Pyron's true freshman season in 2022, he appeared in only three games and started two of them but amassed 692 total offensive yards and five touchdowns. He also completed 49 out of 82 passes. He made his first career start against Virginia Tech and was named the ACC rookie of the week for his performance.

During the 2023 season, he appeared in six games as a backup starting quarterback to Haynes King. He completed four out of eight passing attempts for 20 yards and ran eight times for 29 yards. He would run twice for eight yards in the 2023 Gasparilla Bowl.

During the 2024 season, he played in 10 games and started two of them, finishing the season with completing 35 out of 65 passing attempts for 409 yards, two touchdowns and three interceptions.

On December 2, 2024, Pyron announced that he would enter the NCAA transfer portal. He announced that he would transfer to Minnesota on December 11, but re-entered the transfer portal again on April 17, 2025.

=== South Alabama ===
On April 18, 2025, Pyron announced that he would be transferring to South Alabama.

=== Statistics ===
Season	Team	Games			Passing								Rushing			
Season	Team	GP	GS	Record	Cmp	Att	Pct	Yds	Y/A	TD	Int	Rtg	Att	Yds	Avg	TD
2022	Georgia Tech	3	2	1–1	49	82	59.8	565	6.9	3	3	122.4	35	127	3.6	2
2023	Georgia Tech	6	0	—	4	8	50.0	21	2.6	0	1	47.1	8	29	3.6	0
2024	Georgia Tech	10	2	0–2	35	65	53.8	409	6.3	2	3	107.6	36	115	3.2	4
2025	South Alabama	0	0	—	DNP											
Career		19	4	1−3	88	155	56.8	995	6.4	5	7	112.3	79	271	3.4	6
