= 2024 Birmingham Bowl =

Postseason college football bowl game

- 18th Birmingham Bowl
Georgia Tech Yellow Jackets	Vanderbilt Commodores
(7–5)	(6–6)
ACC	SEC
27	35
Head coach: Brent Key	Head coach: Clark Lea
	1	2	3	4	Total
Georgia Tech	0	10	3	14	27
Vanderbilt	7	7	7	14	35
- Date: December 27, 2024
- Season: 2024
- Stadium: Protective Stadium
- Location: Birmingham, Alabama
- MVP: Diego Pavia (QB, Vanderbilt)
- Favorite: Georgia Tech by 2.5
- Referee: Mark Kluczynski (Big Ten)
- Attendance: 33,840

United States TV coverage
- Network: ESPN
- Announcers: Dave Neal (play-by-play), Aaron Murray (analyst), and Ashley ShahAhmadi (sideline)

The 2024 Birmingham Bowl was a college football bowl game played on December 27, 2024, at Protective Stadium located in Birmingham, Alabama. The 18th annual Birmingham Bowl featured Georgia Tech and Vanderbilt. The game began at approximately 2:30 p.m. CST and aired on ESPN. The Birmingham Bowl was one of the 2024–25 bowl games concluding the 2024 FBS football season.

== Teams ==
Consistent with conference tie-ins, the game featured Georgia Tech from the Atlantic Coast Conference (ACC) and Vanderbilt from the Southeastern Conference (SEC). Both teams accepted bowl invitations on December 8. The teams share a historic rivalry, having met 38 times previously, although this was their first meeting since 2016.

=== Georgia Tech Yellow Jackets ===
Georgia Tech compiled a 7–5 regular-season record (5–3 in ACC play). The Yellow Jackets won their first two games and were briefly ranked 23rd in the nation, their first AP Poll ranking since 2015. Georgia Tech faced five ranked teams during the season, defeating Florida State and Miami while losing to Louisville, Notre Dame, and Georgia.

=== Vanderbilt Commodores ===
Vanderbilt finished the regular season 6–6, a significant improvement from their 2–10 season in 2023. The Commodores received widespread attention after they defeated top-ranked Alabama, 40–35, on October 5.

The upset marked the beginning of a three-game winning streak that saw Vanderbilt receive its first AP poll ranking since 2013. Vanderbilt also notched upsets over Virginia Tech, Kentucky, and Auburn (the final of which granted Vanderbilt bowl eligibility for the first time since 2018) while only losing by one score to Georgia State, No. 7 Missouri, No. 5 Texas, and LSU. Vanderbilt lost its regular season finale in a rivalry game against Tennessee.

With their win over Georgia Tech, Vanderbilt secured their first winning season since the 2013 Commodores and their first bowl win since the 2014 BBVA Compass Bowl.

== Game summary ==
The game was delayed by lightning in the fourth quarter, pausing for approximately an hour.

2024 Birmingham Bowl

Quarter	1	2	3	4	Total
Georgia Tech	0	10	3	14	27
Vanderbilt	7	7	7	14	35

at Protective Stadium • Birmingham, Alabama

- Date: Friday, December 27, 2024
- Game time: 2:35 p.m. CST
- Game weather: Cloudy • Temperature: 59 °F (15 °C)
- Game attendance: 33,840
- Referee: Mark Kluczynski
- TV announcers (ESPN): Dave Neal (play-by-play), Aaron Murray (analyst), and Ashley ShahAhmadi (sideline)
- Box score

Game information

First Quarter

- (2:26) VAN – Cole Spence 7 yard pass from Diego Pavia, Brock Taylor kick (Drive: 8 plays, 87 yards, 4:40; Vanderbilt 7–0)

Second Quarter

- (10:06) GT – Ryland Goede 2 yard pass from Haynes King, Aidan Birr kick (Drive: 15 plays, 75 yards, 7:20; Tied 7–7)
- (1:55) VAN – Diego Pavia 2 yard run, Brock Taylor kick (Drive: 14 plays, 81 yards, 8:11; Vanderbilt 14–7)
- (0:08) GT – Aidan Birr 43 yard field goal (Drive: 9 plays, 49 yards, 1:47; Vanderbilt 14–10)

Third Quarter

- (8:34) GT – Aidan Birr 33 yard field goal (Drive: 8 plays, 46 yards, 3:51; Vanderbilt 14–13)
- (0:56) VAN – Eli Stowers 3 yard pass from Diego Pavia, Brock Taylor kick (Drive: 5 plays, 56 yards, 2:20; Vanderbilt 21–13)

Fourth Quarter

- (14:55) VAN – Quincy Skinner 7 yard pass from Diego Pavia, Brock Taylor kick (Drive: 3 plays, 11 yards, 0:49; Vanderbilt 28–13)
- (9:59) VAN – Diego Pavia 6 yard run, Brock Taylor kick (Drive: 6 plays, 73 yards, 3:41; Vanderbilt 35–13)
- (5:03) GT – Jamal Haynes 9 yard pass from Haynes King, Aidan Birr kick (Drive: 11 plays, 75 yards, 4:56; Vanderbilt 35–20)
- (1:30) GT – Bailey Stockton 2 yard pass from Haynes King, Aidan Birr kick (Drive: 11 plays, 83 yards, 2:36; Vanderbilt 35–27)

=== Statistics ===
Statistics	GT	VAN
First downs	24	20
Plays–yards	69–394	59–306
Rushes–yards	36–190	38–146
Passing yards	204	160
Passing: comp–att–int	25–33–1	13–21–0
Time of possession	28:50	31:10

Team	Category	Player	Statistics
Georgia Tech	Passing	Haynes King	25/33, 204 yards, 3 TD, INT
Georgia Tech	Rushing	Jamal Haynes	17 carries, 136 yards
Georgia Tech	Receiving	Abdul Janneh	3 receptions, 34 yards
Vanderbilt	Passing	Diego Pavia	13/21, 160 yards, 3 TD
Vanderbilt	Rushing	Diego Pavia	17 carries, 84 yards, 2 TD
Vanderbilt	Receiving	Eli Stowers	4 receptions, 55 yards, TD
