= Kool-Aid McKinstry =

American football player (born 2002)

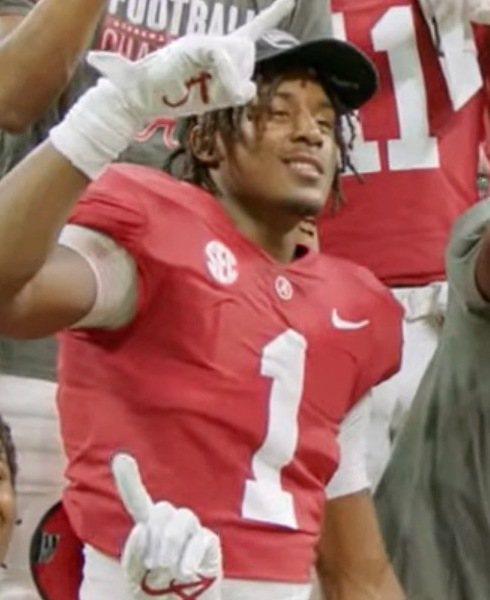
- McKinstry with Alabama in 2021

No. 1 – New Orleans Saints
- Position: Cornerback
- Roster status: Active

Personal information
- Born: September 30, 2002 (age 24); Birmingham, Alabama, U.S.
- Listed height: 5 ft 11 in (1.80 m)
- Listed weight: 199 lb (90 kg)

Career information
- High school: Pinson Valley (Pinson, Alabama)
- College: Alabama (2021–2023)
- NFL draft: 2024: 2nd round, 41st overall pick

Career history
- New Orleans Saints (2024–present)

Awards and highlights
- First-team All-American (2023); 2× first-team All-SEC (2022, 2023)

Career NFL statistics as of Week 7, 2026
- Total tackles: 141
- Pass deflections: 29
- Interceptions: 3
- Stats at Pro Football Reference

Ga'Quincy "Kool-Aid" McKinstry (born September 30, 2002) is an American professional football cornerback for the New Orleans Saints of the National Football League (NFL). He was named the 2021 USA Today High School Football Defensive Player of the Year before playing college football for the Alabama Crimson Tide, where he was named an All-American in 2023.

== Early life ==
McKinstry grew up in Birmingham, Alabama and attended Pinson Valley High School in Pinson, Alabama. He was named Alabama Mr. Football as a senior after breaking up 12 passes with two interceptions, both of which he returned for touchdowns, on defense and catching 45 passes for 706 yards and 11 touchdowns on offense. He was named the USA Today Defensive Player of the Year as a senior. McKinstry was rated a five-star recruit and committed to play college football at Alabama.

== College career ==
McKinstry played college football at Alabama from 2021 to 2023. McKinstry played in every game, and was named to the Southeastern Conference (SEC) All-Freshman team, making 25 tackles with a sack and one interception. He led the SEC in passes defended in the 2022 season with 15. He was named as a first team All-American by the Associated Press for the 2023 season. He declared for the 2024 NFL draft following the 2023 season in which he was named first-team All-American.

== Professional career ==
Pre-draft measurables
Height	Weight	Arm length	Hand span	Wingspan	40-yard dash	10-yard split	20-yard split	Vertical jump	Broad jump
5 ft 11 1/2 in (1.82 m)	199 lb (90 kg)	32 in (0.81 m)	8 1/2 in (0.22 m)	6 ft 3 7/8 in (1.93 m)	4.47 s	1.44 s	2.72 s	34.5 in (0.88 m)	10 ft 1 in (3.07 m)
All values from NFL Combine/Pro Day

On March 1, 2024, it was revealed that McKinstry was diagnosed with a fracture in his right foot, preventing him from taking part at the Combine, but he later stated that he would still participate in the Pro Day activities. McKinstry was selected in the second round by the New Orleans Saints with the 41st pick in the 2024 NFL draft.

In Week 5 of the 2025 season, McKinstry had four tackles, three passes defensed and two interceptions in a 26–14 win over the New York Giants, earning NFC Defensive Player of the Week.

== NFL career statistics ==
Legend
**Bold**	Career high

=== Regular season ===
Year	Team	Games		Tackles					Interceptions					Fumbles			
Year	Team	GP	GS	Cmb	Solo	Ast	Sck	TFL	PD	Int	Yds	Lng	TD	FF	FR	Yds	TD
2024	NO	15	9	42	32	10	0.0	2	6	0	0	0	0	0	0	0	0
2025	NO	17	17	**76**	**59**	**17**	0.0	**3**	**17**	**3**	0	0	0	0	0	0	0
Total		32	26	118	91	27	0.0	5	23	3	0	0	0	0	0	0	0

== Personal life ==
McKinstry was nicknamed "Kool-Aid" by his grandmother as a baby because his smile reminded her of the Kool-Aid Man. He signed a Name, Image and Likeness (NIL) deal with Kool-Aid as a freshman at Alabama.
