= 2024 Mercer Bears football team =

American college football season

2024 Mercer Bears football

SoCon champion

NCAA Division I Quarterfinals, L 7–31 at North Dakota State
- Conference: Southern Conference

Ranking
- STATS: No. 8
- FCS Coaches: No. 7
- Record: 11–3 (7–1 SoCon)
- Head coach: Mike Jacobs (1st season)
- Offensive coordinator: Anthony Soto (1st season)
- Defensive coordinator: Jahmal Brown (1st season)
- Home stadium: Five Star Stadium

2024 Southern Conference football standings
	Conf.			Overall
Team	W		L	W		L
No. 8 Mercer $^	7	–	1	11	–	3
Western Carolina	6	–	2	7	–	5
Chattanooga	5	–	3	7	–	5
East Tennessee State	5	–	3	7	–	5
Samford	3	–	4	4	–	7
The Citadel	3	–	5	5	–	7
Wofford	3	–	5	5	–	7
Furman	2	–	5	3	–	8
VMI	1	–	7	1	–	11
$ – Conference champion; ^ – FCS playoff participant; Rankings from STATS Poll

The 2024 Mercer Bears football team represented Mercer University as a member of the Southern Conference (SoCon) during the 2024 NCAA Division I FCS football season. The Bears were coached by first-year head coach Mike Jacobs and played at Five Star Stadium in Macon, Georgia.

== Schedule ==
Date	Time	Opponent	Rank	Site	TV	Result	Attendance
August 29	7:00 p.m.	Presbyterian*		Five Star Stadium; Macon, GA	ESPN+	W 63–10	7,219
September 7	3:00 p.m.	at Bethune–Cookman*		Daytona Stadium; Daytona Beach, FL	SWAC Digital	W 31–2	8,484
September 14	6:00 p.m.	at No. 14 Chattanooga	No. 23	Finley Stadium; Chattanooga, TN	ESPN+	W 10–3	7,671
September 21	6:00 p.m.	The Citadel	No. 14	Five Star Stadium; Macon, GA	ESPN+	W 38–21	10,489
September 28	1:30 p.m.	at No. 23 Wofford	No. 12	Gibbs Stadium; Spartanburg, SC	ESPN+	W 22–3	1,219
October 12	3:30 p.m.	Princeton*	No. 8	Five Star Stadium; Macon, GA	ESPN+	W 34–7	8,143
October 19	3:00 p.m.	at Samford	No. 7	Pete Hanna Stadium; Homewood, AL	ESPN+	L 35–55	4,216
October 26	3:30 p.m.	No. 24 Western Carolina	No. 14	Five Star Stadium; Macon, GA	ESPN+	W 44–34	7,389
November 2	3:00 p.m.	No. 23 East Tennessee State^{†}	No. 12	Five Star Stadium; Macon, GA	ESPN+	W 37–31	8,692
November 9	1:30 p.m.	at VMI	No. 10	Alumni Memorial Field; Lexington, VA	ESPN+	W 34–0	3,580
November 16	2:00 p.m.	at No. 10 (FBS) Alabama*	No. 7	Bryant–Denny Stadium; Tuscaloosa, AL	SECN+/ESPN+	L 7–52	100,077
November 23	3:00 p.m.	Furman	No. 8	Five Star Stadium; Macon, GA	ESPN+	W 49–23	8,453
December 7	2:00 p.m.	No. 10 Rhode Island*	No. 8	Five Star Stadium; Macon, GA (NCAA Division I Second Round)	ESPN+	W 17–10	8,012
December 14	3:30 p.m.	at No. 3 North Dakota State*	No. 8	Fargodome; Fargo, ND (NCAA Division I Quarterfinal)	ABC	L 7–31	10,353
*Non-conference game; ^{†}Homecoming; Rankings from STATS Poll released prior to the game; All times are in Eastern time

== Game summaries ==
=== vs. Presbyterian ===
Game One – Presbyterian Blue Hose (0–0) at Mercer Bears (0–0) – Game summary

Quarter	1	2	3	4	Total
Blue Hose	3	0	7	0	10
Bears	14	14	14	21	63

at Five Star Stadium • Macon, GA

- Date: Thursday August 29, 2024
- Game time: 7:00 p.m.
- Game weather: Cloudy • Temperature: 91 °F (33 °C) • Wind: S at 6 miles per hour (9.7 km/h)
- Game attendance: 7,219
- Referee: Michael Farmer
- TV announcers (FloSports): Pete Yanity, Jared Singleton, Dave Friedman

Game information

First quarter

- (11:42) MER – Dwayne McGee 3-yard run, Reice Griffith kick (Drive: 5 plays, 64 yards, 1:45; Mercer 7–0)
- (5:17) PRE – Mack Mikko 24-yard field goal (Drive: 6 plays, 54 yards, 2:14; Mercer 7–3)
- (1:08) MER – Kelin Parsons 13-yard pass from DJ Smith, Reice Griffith kick (Drive: 8 plays, 62 yards, 4:02; Mercer 14–3)

Second quarter

- (8:40) MER – DJ Smith 1-yard run, Reice Griffith kick (Drive: 4 plays, 47 yards, 1:45; Mercer 21–3)
- (1:16) MER – Tyrell Coard 4-yard run, Reice Griffith kick (Drive: 10 plays, 71 yards, 4:00; Mercer 28–3)

Third quarter

- (13:45) MER – Brayden Smith 68-yard pass from DJ Smith, Reice Griffith kick (Drive: 3 plays, 77 yards, 1:10; Mercer 35–3)
- (4:57) MER – Tyrell Coard 9-yard pass from DJ Smith, Reice Griffith kick (Drive: 13 plays, 83 yards, 7:37; Mercer 42–3)
- (3:34) PRE – Cincere Gill 24-yard pass from Ty Englehart, Mack Mikko kick (Drive: 5 plays, 75 yards, 1:23; Mercer 42–10)

Fourth quarter

- (10:48) MER – Parker Wroble 7-yard pass from Hess Horne, Reice Griffith kick (Drive: 8 plays, 37 yards, 4:05; Mercer 49–10)
- (3:58) MER – Chris Joines 0-yard fumble recovery, Reice Griffith kick (Mercer 56–10)
- (1:39) MER – Brayden Smith 75-yard punt return, Reice Griffith kick (Mercer 63–10)

Statistics	PRES	MER
First downs	8	25
Total yards	137	500
Rushing yards	-7	139
Passing yards	144	361
Passing: Comp–Att–Int	10–23–2	25–30–1
Time of possession	27:47	32:13

Team	Category	Player	Statistics
Presbyterian	Passing	Ty Englehart	7/19, 84 yards, TD, 2 INT
Presbyterian	Rushing	Denim Edwards	6 carries, 15 yards
Presbyterian	Receiving	Nathan Levicki	1 reception, 57 yards
Mercer	Passing	DJ Smith	20/24, 331 yards, 3 TD, INT
Mercer	Rushing	Dwayne McGee	16 carries, 57 yards, TD
Mercer	Receiving	Brayden Smith	3 receptions, 83 yards, TD

=== at Bethune–Cookman ===
Game Two – Mercer Bears (1–0) at Bethune–Cookman Wildcats (0–1) – Game summary

Quarter	1	2	3	4	Total
Bears	0	21	7	3	31
Wildcats	0	0	2	0	2

at Daytona Stadium • Daytona Beach, FL

- Date: Saturday September 7, 2024
- Game time: 3:00 p.m.
- Game weather: Sunny, 87 °F (31 °C)
- Game attendance: 8,484
- Referee: Charles Green
- TV announcers (SWAC Digital): Michael Truilo, Johnny Vickers, Darryl Nattiel

Game information

First quarter

No scoring plays

Second quarter

- (6:06) MER – Brayden Smith 50-yard pass from D. J. Smith, Reice Griffin kick (Drive: 8 plays, 85 yards, 4:20; Mercer 7–0)
- (1:25) MER – Parker Wroble 14-yard pass from D. J. Smith, Reice Griffin kick (Drive: 6 plays, 55 yards, 2:26; Mercer 14–0)
- (1:02) MER – Kelin Parsons 35-yard pass from D. J. Smith, Reice Griffin kick (Drive: 1 play, 35 yards, 0:05; Mercer 21–0)

Third quarter

- (6:46) MER – Dwayne McGee 1-yard run, Reice Griffin kick (Drive: 11 plays, 94 yards, 5:52; Mercer 28–0)
- (3:32) BCU – Orin Patu 0-yard safety (Mercer 28–2)

Fourth quarter

- (3:35) MER – Reice Griffin 28-yard field goal (Drive: 9 plays, 44 yards, 4:11; Mercer 31–2)

Statistics	MER	BCU
First downs	26	10
Total yards	483	166
Rushing yards	239	29
Passing yards	244	137
Passing: Comp–Att–Int	19–25–1	14–29–1
Time of possession	33:46	26:14

Team	Category	Player	Statistics
Mercer	Passing	D. J. Smith	17/22, 237 yards, 3 TD, INT
Mercer	Rushing	Dwayne McGee	19 carries, 102 yards, TD
Mercer	Receiving	Brayden Smith	4 receptions, 85 yards, TD
Bethune–Cookman	Passing	Cam Ransom	14/29, 137 yards, INT
Bethune–Cookman	Rushing	Courtney Reese	11 carries, 20 yards
Bethune–Cookman	Receiving	Kobe Stewart	1 reception, 50 yards

=== at No. 14 Chattanooga ===
Game Three – No. 23 Mercer Bears (2–0) at No. 14 Chattanooga Mocs (0–2) – Game summary

Quarter	1	2	3	4	Total
No. 23 Bears	0	7	0	3	10
No. 14 Mocs	0	3	0	0	3

at Finley Stadium • Chattanooga, TN

- Date: Saturday September 14, 2024
- Game time: 6:00 p.m.
- Game weather: 0 °F (−18 °C)
- TV announcers (ESPN+): Chris Goforth, Chris Barnett, Dave Keylon

Game information

First quarter
Second quarter
Third quarter
Fourth quarter

Statistics	MER	UTC
First downs		
Total yards		
Rushing yards		
Passing yards		
Passing: Comp–Att–Int		
Time of possession		

Team	Category	Player	Statistics
Mercer	Passing		
Mercer	Rushing		
Mercer	Receiving		
Chattanooga	Passing		
Chattanooga	Rushing		
Chattanooga	Receiving		

=== vs. The Citadel ===
Game Four – The Citadel Bulldogs (2–1) vs No. 14 Mercer Bears (3–0) – Game summary

Quarter	1	2	3	4	Total
Bulldogs	0	14	7	0	21
No. 14 Bears	14	14	7	3	38

at Five Star Stadium • Macon, GA

- Date: Saturday September 21, 2024
- Game time: 6:00 p.m.
- TV announcers (ESPN+): Frank Malloy, Phil Cox

Game information

First quarter
Second quarter
Third quarter
Fourth quarter

Statistics	CIT	MER
First downs		
Total yards		
Rushing yards		
Passing yards		
Passing: Comp–Att–Int		
Time of possession		

Team	Category	Player	Statistics
The Citadel	Passing		
The Citadel	Rushing		
The Citadel	Receiving		
Mercer	Passing		
Mercer	Rushing		
Mercer	Receiving		

=== at No. 23 Wofford ===
Game Five – No. 12 Mercer Bears (4–0) at No. 23 Wofford Terriers (2–1) – Game summary

Quarter	1	2	3	4	Total
No. 12 Bears	3	3	2	14	22
No. 23 Terriers	3	0	0	0	3

at Gibbs Stadium • Spartanburg, SC

- Date: Saturday September 28, 2024
- Game time: 1:30 p.m.
- Game weather: 0 °F (−18 °C)
- TV announcers (ESPN+): Jim Noble, Thom Henson, Van Hipp

Game information

First quarter
Second quarter
Third quarter
Fourth quarter

Statistics	MER	WOF
First downs		
Total yards		
Rushing yards		
Passing yards		
Passing: Comp–Att–Int		
Time of possession		

Team	Category	Player	Statistics
Mercer	Passing		
Mercer	Rushing		
Mercer	Receiving		
Wofford	Passing		
Wofford	Rushing		
Wofford	Receiving		

=== Princeton ===
Game Six – Princeton Tigers (1–2) at No. 8 Mercer Bears (5–0) – Game summary

Quarter	1	2	3	4	Total
Tigers	0	7	0	0	7
No. 8 Bears	17	3	0	14	34

at Five Star Stadium, Macon, GA

- Date: Saturday October 12, 2024
- Game time: 3:30 p.m.
- TV announcers (ESPN+): Frank Malloy, Phil Cox

Game information

First quarter
Second quarter
Third quarter
Fourth quarter

Statistics	PRIN	MER
First downs		
Total yards		
Rushing yards		
Passing yards		
Passing: Comp–Att–Int		
Time of possession		

Team	Category	Player	Statistics
Princeton	Passing		
Princeton	Rushing		
Princeton	Receiving		
Mercer	Passing		
Mercer	Rushing		
Mercer	Receiving		

=== at Samford ===
Game Seven – No. 7 Mercer Bears (6–0) at Samford Bulldogs (2–3) – Game summary

Quarter	1	2	3	4	Total
No. 7 Bears	0	0	0	0	0
Bulldogs	0	0	0	0	0

at Pete Hanna Stadium, Homewood, AL

- Date: Saturday October 19, 2024
- Game time: 3:30 p.m.
- TV announcers (ESPN+): Blake Gardner, Damian Mitchell, Justin Stuckey

Game information

First quarter
Second quarter
Third quarter
Fourth quarter

Statistics	MER	SAM
First downs		
Total yards		
Rushing yards		
Passing yards		
Passing: Comp–Att–Int		
Time of possession		

Team	Category	Player	Statistics
Mercer	Passing		
Mercer	Rushing		
Mercer	Receiving		
Samford	Passing		
Samford	Rushing		
Samford	Receiving		

=== No. 24 Western Carolina ===
Game Eight – No. 24 Western Carolina Catamounts (4–3) vs No. 14 Mercer Bears (6–1) – Game summary

Quarter	1	2	3	4	Total
No. 24 Catamounts	0	0	0	0	0
No. 14 Bears	0	0	0	0	0

at Five Star Stadium, Macon, GA

- Date: Saturday October 26, 2024
- Game time: 3:30 PM
- TV announcers (ESPN+): Frank Malloy, Phil Cox

Game information

First quarter
Second quarter
Third quarter
Fourth quarter

Statistics	WCU	MER
First downs		
Total yards		
Rushing yards		
Passing yards		
Passing: Comp–Att–Int		
Time of possession		

Team	Category	Player	Statistics
Western Carolina	Passing		
Western Carolina	Rushing		
Western Carolina	Receiving		
Mercer	Passing		
Mercer	Rushing		
Mercer	Receiving		

=== No. 23 East Tennessee State ===
Game Nine – No. 23 East Tennessee State Buccaneers (5–3) vs No. 12 Mercer Bears (7–1) – Game summary

Quarter	1	2	3	4	Total
No. 23 Buccaneers	14	0	7	10	31
No. 12 Bears	3	14	14	6	37

at Five Star Stadium • Macon, GA

- Date: Saturday November 2, 2024
- Game time: 3:00 p.m.
- Game weather: Sunny • Temperature: 83 °F (28 °C) • Wind: NE 5 mph
- Game attendance: 8,692
- Referee: Brian Holland
- TV announcers (ESPN+): Frank Malloy (play-by-play), Phil Cox (analyst)

Game information

First quarter

- (10:49) MER - Reice Griffith 36-yard field goal (Drive: 4 plays, 7 yards, 1:17; Mercer 3-0)
- (10:34) ETSU - Hakeem Meggett 68-yard pass from Jaylen King, Ewan Johnson kick (Drive: 1 play, 68 yards, 0:09; East Tennessee State 7-3)
- (2:02) ETSU - Gino English 1-yard run, Ewan Johnson kick (Drive: 9 plays, 46 yards, 3:41; East Tennessee State 14-3)

Second quarter

- (13:29) MER - Brayden Manley 0-yard fumble recovery, Reice Griffith kick (East Tennessee State 14-10)
- (12:16) MER - Marques Thomas 25-yard interception, Reice Griffith kick (Mercer 17-14)

Third quarter

- (9:22) MER - Kellin Parsons 34-yard pass from Whitt Newbauer, Reice Griffith kick (Drive: 8 plays, 79 yards, 4:12; Mercer 24-14)
- (4:38) MER - Mic Wasson 20-yard punt return, Reice Griffith kick (Mercer 31-14)
- (2:40) ETSU - AJ Johnson 18-yard pass from Gino English, Ewan Johnson kick (Drive: 5 plays, 62 yards, 1:50; Mercer 31-21)

Fourth quarter

- (12:44) MER - Reice Griffith 36-yard field goal (Drive: 5 plays, 10 yards, 1:34; Mercer 34-21)
- (5:55) ETSU - AJ Johnson 9-yard pass from Gino English, Ewan Johnson kick (Drive: 5 plays, 79 yards, 0:50; Mercer 34-28)
- (1:37) MER - Reice Griffith 31-yard field goal (Drive: 12 plays, 61 yards, 4:18; Mercer 37-28)
- (0:45) ETSU - Ewan Johnson 44-yard field goal (Drive: 4 plays, 49 yards, 0:52; Mercer 37-31)

Statistics	ETSU	MER
First downs	19	15
Total yards	472	292
Rushing yards	13	130
Passing yards	459	162
Passing: Comp–Att–Int	25-44-3	18-29-0
Time of possession	27:01	32:59

Team	Category	Player	Statistics
East Tennessee State	Passing	Gino English	14-19, 267 yards, 2 TD, INT
East Tennessee State	Rushing	Bryson Irby	7 carries, 11 yards
East Tennessee State	Receiving	AJ Johnson	10 receptions, 162 yards, 2 TDs
Mercer	Passing	Whitt Newbauer	11-18, 124 yards, TD
Mercer	Rushing	Dwayne McGee	25 carries, 127 yards
Mercer	Receiving	Kelin Parsons	4 receptions, 60 yards, TD

=== at VMI ===
Game Ten – No. 10 Mercer Bears (8–1) vs VMI Keydets (1–8) – Game summary

Quarter	1	2	3	4	Total
No. 10 Bears	0	0	0	0	0
Keydets	0	0	0	0	0

at Alumni Memorial Field • Lexington, VA

- Date: Saturday November 9, 2024
- Game time: 1:30 p.m.
- TV announcers (ESPN+): Wade Branner, Cal Murray

Game information

First quarter
Second quarter
Third quarter
Fourth quarter

Statistics	MER	VMI
First downs		
Total yards		
Rushing yards		
Passing yards		
Passing: Comp–Att–Int		
Time of possession		

Team	Category	Player	Statistics
Mercer	Passing		
Mercer	Rushing		
Mercer	Receiving		
VMI	Passing		
VMI	Rushing		
VMI	Receiving		

=== at No. 10 (FBS) Alabama ===
Game Eleven – No. 7 Mercer Bears (9–1) vs No. 10 (FBS) Alabama Crimson Tide (7–2) – Game summary

Quarter	1	2	3	4	Total
No. 7 Bears	0	0	0	0	0
No. 10 (FBS) Crimson Tide	0	0	0	0	0

at Bryant–Denny Stadium • Tuscaloosa, AL

- Date: Saturday November 16, 2024
- Game time: 2:00 p.m.
- TV announcers (SECN+/ESPN+): Jay Alter (play-by-play), Rocky Boiman (analyst) and Ashley Stroehlein (sideline)

Game information

First quarter
Second quarter
Third quarter
Fourth quarter

Statistics	MER	ALA
First downs		
Total yards		
Rushing yards		
Passing yards		
Passing: Comp–Att–Int		
Time of possession		

Team	Category	Player	Statistics
Mercer	Passing		
Mercer	Rushing		
Mercer	Receiving		
Alabama	Passing		
Alabama	Rushing		
Alabama	Receiving		

=== Furman ===
Game Twelve – Furman Paladins (3–7) vs No. 8 Mercer Bears (9–2) – Game summary

Quarter	1	2	3	4	Total
Paladins	0	0	0	0	0
No. 8 Bears	0	0	0	0	0

at Five Star Stadium • Macon, GA

- Date: Saturday November 23, 2024
- Game time: 3:00 p.m.
- TV announcers (ESPN+): Frank Malloy, Jason Patterson

Game information

First quarter
Second quarter
Third quarter
Fourth quarter

Statistics	FUR	MER
First downs		
Total yards		
Rushing yards		
Passing yards		
Passing: Comp–Att–Int		
Time of possession		

Team	Category	Player	Statistics
Furman	Passing		
Furman	Rushing		
Furman	Receiving		
Mercer	Passing		
Mercer	Rushing		
Mercer	Receiving		

=== No. 10 Rhode Island (NCAA Division I playoff–second round) ===
Game Thirteen – No. 10 Rhode Island Rams (11–2) at No. 8 Mercer Bears (10–2) – Game summary

Quarter	1	2	3	4	Total
No. 10 Rams	0	3	7	0	10
No. 8 Bears	7	0	0	10	17

at Five Star Stadium • Macon, GA

- Date: Saturday December 7, 2024
- Game time: 2:00 PM EST
- TV announcers (ESPN+): Michael Reghi, Forrest Conoly

Game information

First quarter

- (3:33) MER – Myles Redding 25-yard interception return (Reice Griffith kick) (Drive: 1 play, 0 yards, 0:08; Mercer 7–0)

Second quarter

- (0:00) URI – Ty Groff 17-yard field goal (Drive: 12 plays, 64 yards, 2:29; Mercer 7–3)

Third quarter

- (2:33) URI – Marquis Buchanan 56-yard pass from Hunter Helms (Ty Groff kick) (Drive: 1 play, 56 yards, 0:08; Rhode Island 10–7)

Fourth quarter

- (14:19) MER – Adjatay Dabbs 4-yard pass from Whitt Newbauer (Reice Griffith kick) (Drive: 7 plays, 69 yards, 3:07; Mercer 14–10)
- (6:10) MER – Reice Griffith 24-yard field goal (Drive: 8 plays, 58 yards, 4:05; Mercer 17–10)

Statistics	URI	MER
First downs	14	15
Total yards	315	242
Rushing yards	49	185
Passing yards	266	57
Passing: Comp–Att–Int	22-33-1	10-20-0
Time of possession	26:22	33:38

Team	Category	Player	Statistics
Rhode Island	Passing	Hunter Helms	22/33, 266 yards, TD, INT
Rhode Island	Rushing	Malik Grant	13 carries, 36 yards
Rhode Island	Receiving	Marquis Buchanan	11 carries, 119 yards, TD
Mercer	Passing	Whitt Newbauer	10/20, 57 yards, TD
Mercer	Rushing	Dwayne McGee	21 carries, 114 yards
Mercer	Receiving	Adjatay Dabbs	5 receptions, 23 yards, TD

=== at No. 3 North Dakota State (NCAA Division I playoff–quarterfinal) ===
Game Fourteen – No. 8 Mercer Bears (11–2) vs No. 3 North Dakota State Bison (11–2) – Game summary

Quarter	1	2	3	4	Total
No. 8 Bears	7	0	0	0	7
No. 3 Bison	14	10	0	7	31

at Fargodome • Fargo, ND

- Date: Saturday December 14, 2024
- Game time: 3:30 p.m.
- Game weather: Indoors; 70 °F (21 °C)
- Game attendance: 10,353
- Referee: Kelly Holman
- TV announcers (ABC): Roy Philpott (play-by-play), Sam Acho (analyst) and Lauren Sisler (sideline)

Game information

First quarter

- (12:03) NDSU – Bryce Lance 40-yard pass from Cam Miller, Griffin Crosa kick (Drive: 4 plays, 50 yards, 1:57; North Dakota State 7–0)
- (9:31) NDSU – Bryce Lance 4-yard pass from Cam Miller, Griffin Crosa kick (Drive: 2 plays, 74 yards, 0:30; North Dakota State 14–0)
- (7:01) MER – Kelin Parsons 38-yard pass from Whitt Newbauer, Reice Griffith kick (Drive: 5 plays, 73 yards, 2:25; North Dakota State 14–7)

Second quarter

- (12:01) NDSU – Cam Miller 34-yard run, Griffin Crosa kick (Drive: 6 plays, 55 yards, 2:52; North Dakota State 21–7)
- (0:11) NDSU – Griffin Crosa 38-yard field goal (Drive: 6 plays, 70 yards, 0:59; North Dakota State 24–7)

Third quarter

No scoring plays

Fourth quarter

- (1:57) NDSU – Barika Kpeenu 1-yard run, Griffin Crosa kick (Drive: 11 plays, 54 yards, 5:59; North Dakota State 31–7)

Statistics	MER	NDSU
First downs	8	20
Total yards	195	392
Rushing yards	109	133
Passing yards	86	259
Passing: Comp–Att–Int	10–20–1	16–26–2
Time of possession	24:22	35:38

Team	Category	Player	Statistics
Mercer	Passing	Whitt Newbauer	8/18, 90 yards, TD, INT
Mercer	Rushing	Dwayne McGee	14 carries, 59 yards
Mercer	Receiving	Kelin Parsons	1 reception, 38 yards, TD
North Dakota State	Passing	Cam Miller	16/25, 259 yards, 2 TD, 2 INT
North Dakota State	Rushing	CharMar Brown	11 carries, 58 yards
North Dakota State	Receiving	Mekhi Collins	4 receptions, 119 yards
