= 2024 Georgia Tech Yellow Jackets football team =

American college football season

2024 Georgia Tech Yellow Jackets football

Birmingham Bowl, L 27–35 vs. Vanderbilt
- Conference: Atlantic Coast Conference
- Record: 7–6 (5–3 ACC)
- Head coach: Brent Key (2nd season)
- Offensive coordinator: Buster Faulkner (2nd season)
- Co-offensive coordinator: Chris Weinke (2nd season)
- Offensive scheme: Run heavy pro spread
- Defensive coordinator: Tyler Santucci (1st season)
- Base defense: 4–2–5
- Home stadium: Bobby Dodd Stadium

Uniform
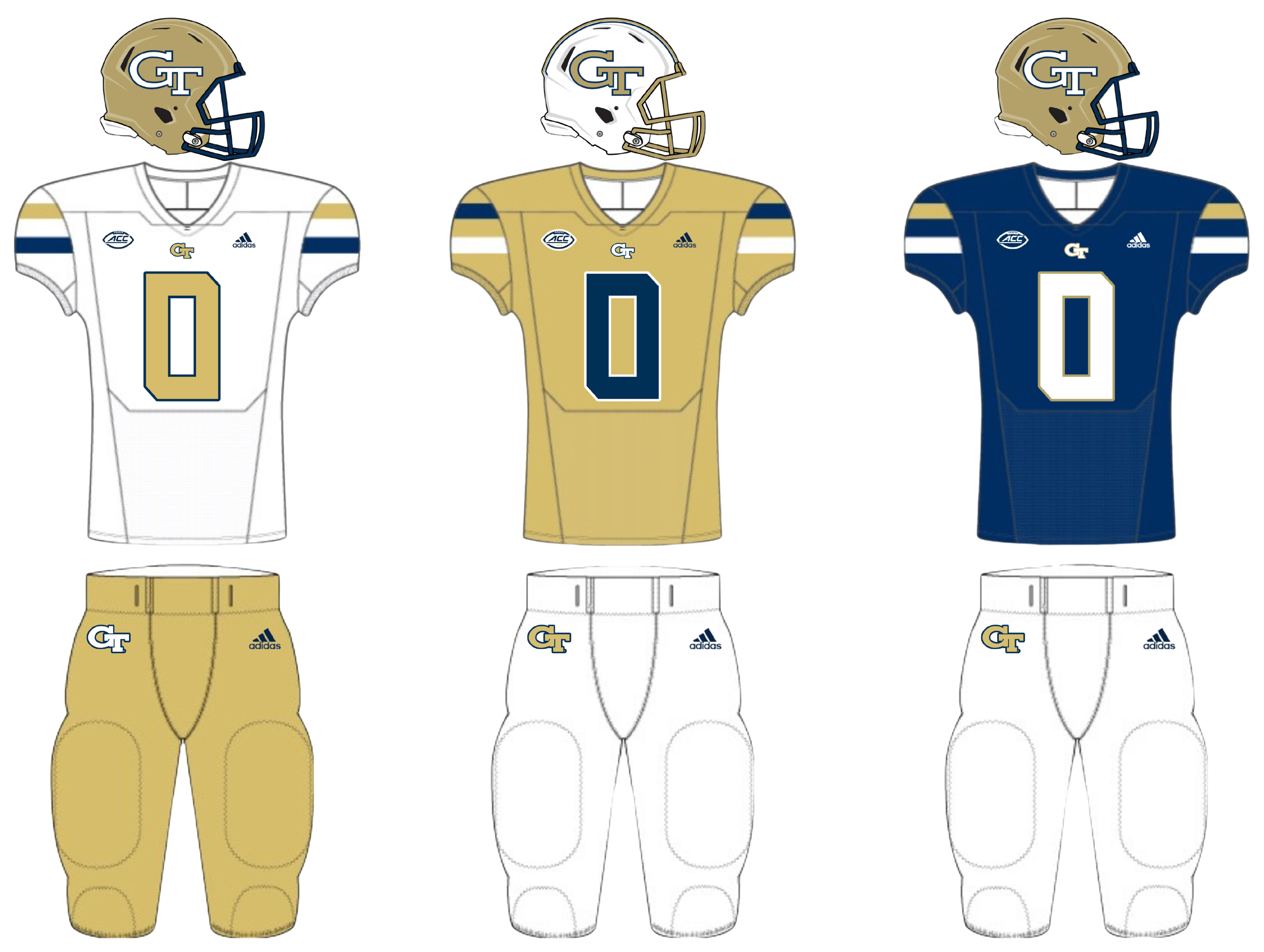

2024 Atlantic Coast Conference football standings
	Conf.			Overall
Team	W		L	W		L
No. 12 SMU y^	8	–	0	11	–	3
No. 14 Clemson y$^	7	–	1	10	–	4
No. 18 Miami (FL)	6	–	2	10	–	3
No. 20 Syracuse	5	–	3	10	–	3
Duke	5	–	3	9	–	4
Louisville	5	–	3	9	–	4
Georgia Tech	5	–	3	7	–	6
Boston College	4	–	4	7	–	6
Virginia Tech	4	–	4	6	–	7
Pittsburgh	3	–	5	7	–	6
NC State	3	–	5	6	–	7
North Carolina	3	–	5	6	–	7
Virginia	3	–	5	5	–	7
California	2	–	6	6	–	7
Wake Forest	2	–	6	4	–	8
Stanford	2	–	6	3	–	9
Florida State	1	–	7	2	–	10
Championship: Clemson 34, SMU 31
^ – College Football Playoff participant; $ – Conference champion; y – Championship game participant; Rankings from AP Poll

The 2024 Georgia Tech Yellow Jackets football team represented the Georgia Institute of Technology as a member of the Atlantic Coast Conference (ACC) during the 2024 NCAA Division I FBS football season. The Yellow Jackets were led by Brent Key in his second full year as Georgia Tech's head coach. They played their home games at Bobby Dodd Stadium located in Atlanta, Georgia.

Georgia Tech was coming off its first winning season and bowl game since 2018. They have the 6th-hardest schedule in the country, according to 247 Sports.

The Yellow Jackets began the season against Florida State at Aviva Stadium in Dublin, Ireland with an upset win. After a 2–0 start, the Yellow Jackets earned their first AP Poll ranking since 2015. This was their second appearance in the Aer Lingus College Football Classic, after previously defeating Boston College in 2016.

By upsetting the undefeated, No. 4-ranked Miami Hurricanes on November 9, Georgia Tech snapped a 13-game losing streak to top-five opponents and became bowl-eligible. It was the Yellow Jackets' highest-ranked win since a victory over No. 4 Virginia Tech in 2009.

In the emotional regular-season finale against longtime rival Georgia, the Yellow Jackets led 17–0 at halftime, but lost 44–42 after eight overtimes. The game was only one overtime short of the record, behind a nine-overtime victory by Illinois over Penn State in 2021. The Yellow Jackets ended the season with a controversial but decisive loss to Vanderbilt in the 2024 Birmingham Bowl, finishing the season 7–6. Despite the disappointing end to the season, Georgia Tech finished with its first consecutive winning seasons since 2013–2014.

== Offseason ==
=== Transfers ===
==== Outgoing ====
Player	Position	Destination
Jack Barton	EDGE	UConn
James BlackStrain	WR	Missouri State
Colson Brown	QB	Anderson
Justin Brown	WR	Western Kentucky
Sirad Bryant	S	UAB
Elias Cloy	IOL	Alabama A&M
Noah Collins	EDGE	Arkansas State
Bryston Dixon	DL	South Alabama
D'Quan Douse	DL	Michigan State
Gabriel Fortson	IOL	Tulane
Tyler Gibson	OT	Charlotte
Zach Gibson	QB	Georgia State
Wing Green	OT	Campbell
Ashton Heflin	LB	Marshall
Kenan Johnson	CB	Utah
Steven Jones Jr.	CB	Murray State
Eddie Kelly	DL	Missouri
Kyle Kennard	EDGE	South Carolina
Jakiah Leftwich	OT	North Carolina
Jullian Lewis	WR	FIU
Tyson Meiguez	LB	Murray State
Jason Moore	DL	Temple
Ezra Odinjor	EDGE	UAB
Malcolm Pugh	DL	Louisiana Tech
Etinosa Reuben	DL	UMass
Aidan Semo	QB	El Camino College
Paul Tchio	OT	UMass
Ayo Tifase	DL	Charlotte
KJ Wallace	CB	UCLA
Kenyatta Watson II	CB	Georgia State
Jamie Felix	RB	Withdrawn
Trenilyas Tatum	LB	Withdrawn
Tyler Rowe	CB	TBD
Eric Reed	CB	TBD
Khari Gee	S	TBD

==== Incoming ====
Player	Position	Previous School
Jayden Davis	S	Cincinnati
Ayobami Tifase	DL	Florida State
Jack Barton	EDGE	Furman
E.J. Lightsey	LB	Georgia
Zachary Tobe	CB	Illinois
Jackson Hamilton	LB	Louisville
Thomas Gore	DL	Miami
Josh Beetham	TE	Michigan
Keylan Rutledge	IOL	Middle Tennessee
Ryland Goede	TE	Mississippi State
Jordan van den Berg	DL	Penn State
Syeed Gibbs	CB	Rhode Island
Jason Moore	DT	Temple
Warren Burrell	CB	Tennessee
Romello Height	EDGE	USC
Jackson Hawes	TE	Yale

== Schedule ==
Date	Time	Opponent	Rank	Site	TV	Result	Attendance
August 24	12:00 p.m.	vs. No. 10 Florida State		Aviva Stadium; Dublin, Ireland (Aer Lingus College Football Classic, College GameDay)	ESPN	W 24–21	47,998
August 31	8:00 p.m.	Georgia State*		Bobby Dodd Stadium; Atlanta, GA	ACCN	W 35–12	40,113
September 7	12:00 p.m.	at Syracuse	No. 23	JMA Wireless Dome; Syracuse, NY	ACCN	L 28–31	39,550
September 14	3:30 p.m.	VMI*		Bobby Dodd Stadium; Atlanta, GA	ACCNX/ESPN+	W 59–7	31,729
September 21	3:30 p.m.	at No. 19 Louisville		L&N Federal Credit Union Stadium; Louisville, KY	ESPN2	L 19–31	50,727
October 5	8:00 p.m.	Duke		Bobby Dodd Stadium; Atlanta, GA	ACCN	W 24–14	37,287
October 12	12:00 p.m.	at North Carolina		Kenan Memorial Stadium; Chapel Hill, NC	The CW	W 41–34	44,482
October 19	3:30 p.m.	vs. No. 12 Notre Dame*		Mercedes-Benz Stadium; Atlanta, GA (rivalry)	ESPN	L 13–31	59,021
October 26	12:00 p.m.	at Virginia Tech		Lane Stadium; Blacksburg, VA (rivalry)	ACCN	L 6–21	65,632
November 9	12:00 p.m.	No. 4 Miami (FL)		Bobby Dodd Stadium; Atlanta, GA	ESPN	W 28–23	47,358
November 21	7:30 p.m.	NC State		Bobby Dodd Stadium; Atlanta, GA	ESPN	W 30–29	34,591
November 29	7:30 p.m.	at No. 7 Georgia*		Sanford Stadium; Athens, GA (Clean, Old-Fashioned Hate)	ABC	L 42–44 ^{8OT}	93,033
December 27	3:30 p.m.	vs. Vanderbilt*		Protective Stadium; Birmingham, AL (Birmingham Bowl / rivalry)	ESPN	L 27–35	33,840
*Non-conference game; Rankings from AP Poll - Released prior to game; All times are in Eastern time

== Rankings ==
Ranking movements Legend: ██ Increase in ranking ██ Decrease in ranking — = Not ranked RV = Received votes
	Week																
Poll	Pre	1	2	3	4	5	6	7	8	9	10	11	12	13	14	15	Final
AP	—	23	—	—	—	—	—	—	—	—	—	—	RV	RV	—	—	—
Coaches	—	RV	—	—	—	—	—	—	—	—	—	—	—	RV	RV	RV	—
CFP	Not released										—	—	—	—	—	—	Not released

== Game summaries ==
=== vs. No. 10 Florida State (College GameDay) ===
Game One – No. 10 Florida State Seminoles (0–0) vs. Georgia Tech Yellow Jackets (0–0) – Game summary

Quarter	1	2	3	4	Total
No. 10 Seminoles	8	6	0	7	21
Yellow Jackets	7	7	0	10	24

at Aviva Stadium • Dublin, Ireland

- Date: August 24, 2024
- Game time: 12:00 p.m. EDT/5:00 p.m. IST
- Game weather: Clear
- Game attendance: 47,998
- Referee: Jerry Magallanes
- TV announcers (ESPN): Joe Tessitore (play-by-play), Jesse Palmer (analyst), and Katie George (sideline reporter)
- Box score, Recap

Game information

First quarter

- (10:58) FSU – Lawrance Toafili 28-yard run (Brian Courtney run) (Drive: 7 plays, 75 yards, 4:02; Florida State 8-0)
- (7:26) GT – Zach Pyron 1-yard run (Aidan Birr kick) (Drive: 6 plays, 79 yards, 3:32; Florida State 8-7)

Second quarter

- (11:06) FSU – Ryan Fitzgerald 52-yard field goal (Drive: 8 plays, 41 yards, 5:11; Florida State 11-7)
- (3:13) GT – Jamal Haynes 1-yard run (Aidan Birr kick) (Drive: 14 plays, 75 yards, 7:53; Georgia Tech 14-11)
- (0:00) FSU – Ryan Fitzgerald 59-yard field goal (Drive: 9 plays, 34 yards, 3:13; Tied 14-14)

Third quarter

- No scoring

Fourth quarter

- (14:57) GT – Jamal Haynes 2-yard run (Aidan Birr kick) (Drive: 11 plays, 89 yards, 6:22; Georgia Tech 21-14)
- (6:33) FSU – Roydell Williams 1-yard run (Ryan Fitzgerald kick) (Drive: 15 plays, 84 yards, 8:24; Tied 21-21)
- (0:00) GT – Aidan Birr 44-yard field goal (Drive: 12 plays, 49 yards, 6:33; Georgia Tech 24-21)

Statistics	FSU	GT
First downs	20	18
Total yards	291	336
Rushing yards	98	190
Passing yards	193	146
Passing: Comp–Att–Int	19–27–0	11–16–0
Time of possession	30:39	29:21

Team	Category	Player	Statistics
Florida State	Passing	DJ Uiagalelei	19/27, 193 yards
Florida State	Rushing	Roydell Williams	12 carries, 38 yards, TD
Florida State	Receiving	Jakhi Douglas	4 receptions, 55 yards
Georgia Tech	Passing	Haynes King	11/16, 146 yards
Georgia Tech	Rushing	Jamal Haynes	11 carries, 75 yards, 2 TD
Georgia Tech	Receiving	Malik Rutherford	4 receptions, 66 yards

=== vs Georgia State ===
Game Two – Georgia State Panthers (0–0) vs Georgia Tech Yellow Jackets (1–0) – Game summary

Quarter	1	2	3	4	Total
Panthers	0	3	9	0	12
Yellow Jackets	7	7	14	7	35

at Bobby Dodd Stadium, Atlanta, Georgia

- Date: Saturday August 31, 2024
- Game time: 8:00 p.m. EDT
- Game weather: Sunny • Temperature: 84 °F (29 °C)
- Game attendance: 40,113
- Referee: Kyle Olson
- TV announcers (ACCN): Wes Durham (play-by-play), Tom Luginbill (analyst), and Dana Boyle (sideline reporter)
- Box score, Recap

Game information

First quarter

- GT – Jamal Haynes 1-yard run (Aidan Birr kick), 3:01. Yellow Jackets 7–0. Drive: 6 plays, 20 yards, 2:34.

Second quarter

- GAST – Liam Rickman 21-yard field goal, 3:49. Yellow Jackets 7–3. Drive: 16 plays, 87 yards, 8:24.
- GT – Haynes King 2-yard run (Aidan Birr kick), 0:04. Yellow Jackets 14–3. Drive: 11 plays, 75 yards, 3:45.

Third quarter

- GT – Eric Singleton Jr. 35-yard run (Aidan Birr kick), 13:01. Yellow Jackets 21–3. Drive: 4 plays, 65 yards, 1:59.
- GT – Malik Rutherford 52-yard pass from Haynes King (Aidan Birr kick), 11:19. Yellow Jackets 28–3. Drive: 1 play, 52 yards, 0:08.
- GAST – Liam Rickman 47-yard field goal, 9:52. Yellow Jackets 28–6. Drive: 6 plays, 45 yards, 1:27.
- GAST – Dorian Fleming 24-yard pass from Christian Veilleux (pass failed), 3:42. Yellow Jackets 28–12. Drive: 9 plays, 68 yards, 4:08.

Fourth quarter

- GT – Avery Boyd 22-yard pass from Haynes King (Aidan Birr kick), 14:14. Yellow Jackets 35–12. Drive: 9 plays, 75 yards, 4:28.

Statistics	GAST	GT
First downs	19	22
Total yards	360	499
Rushing yards	210	274
Passing yards	150	225
Passing: Comp–Att–Int	19–34–0	25–30–1
Time of possession	29:58	30:02

Team	Category	Player	Statistics
Georgia State	Passing	Christian Veilleux	19/34, 210 yards, TD
Georgia State	Rushing	Freddie Brock	10 rushes, 61 yards
Georgia State	Receiving	Dorian Fleming	4 receptions, 68 yards, TD
Georgia Tech	Passing	Haynes King	24/29, 275 yards, 2 TD, INT
Georgia Tech	Rushing	Jamal Haynes	17 rushes, 84 yards, TD
Georgia Tech	Receiving	Malik Rutherford	7 receptions, 131 yards, TD

=== at Syracuse ===
Game Three – No. 23 Georgia Tech Yellow Jackets (2–0) vs Syracuse Orange (1–0) – Game summary

Quarter	1	2	3	4	Total
No. 23 Yellow Jackets	7	7	0	14	28
Orange	7	14	3	7	31

at JMA Wireless Dome, Syracuse, New York

- Date: Saturday September 7, 2024
- Game time: 12:00 PM
- Game weather: None (indoor stadium)
- Game attendance: 39,550
- Referee: Mike Roche
- TV announcers (ACCN): Chris Cotter (play-by-play), Mark Herzlich (analyst), and Coley Harvey (sideline reporter)

Game information

First quarter

- (12:21) SYR – Trebor Pena 11-yard pass from Kyle McCord, Brady Denaburg kick (Drive: 7 plays, 75 yards, 2:39; Syracuse 7-0)
- (7:52) GT – Haynes King 21-yard run, Aidan Birr kick (Drive: 10 plays, 75 yards, 4:29; Tied 7-7)

Second quarter

- (12:27) SYR – Trebor Pena 11-yard pass from Kyle McCord, Brady Denaburg kick (Drive: 7 plays, 70 yards, 3:18; Syracuse 14-7)
- (6:19) SYR – Oronde Gadsden II 20-yard pass from Kyle McCord, Brady Denaburg kick (Drive: 9 plays, 89 yards, 4:18; Syracuse 21-7)
- (4:39) GT – Haynes King 26-yard run, Aidan Birr kick (Drive: 4 plays, 75 yards, 1:40; Syracuse 21-14)

Third quarter

- (6:51) SYR – Brady Denaburg 33-yard field goal (Drive: 15 plays, 65 yards, 6:55; Syracuse 24-14)

Fourth quarter

- (8:39) SYR – Oronde Gadsden II 17-yard pass from Kyle McCord, Brady Denaburg kick (Drive: 7 plays, 32 yards, 4:01; Syracuse 31-14)
- (5:08) GT – Chase Lane 4-yard pass from Haynes King, Aidan Birr kick (Drive: 12 plays, 75 yards, 3:31; Syracuse 31-21)
- (2:31) GT – Jamal Haynes 15-yard run, Aidan Birr kick (Drive: 9 plays, 56 yards, 2:35; Syracuse 31-28)

Statistics	GT	SYR
First downs	19	27
Total yards	378	515
Rushing yards	112	134
Passing yards	266	381
Passing: Comp–Att–Int	29–40–0	32–46–0
Time of possession	23:06	36:54

Team	Category	Player	Statistics
Georgia Tech	Passing	Haynes King	29–39, 266 yards, TD
Georgia Tech	Rushing	Haynes King	6 rushes, 67 yards, 2 TD
Georgia Tech	Receiving	Eric Singleton Jr.	5 receptions, 86 yards
Syracuse	Passing	Kyle McCord	32–46, 381 yards, 4 TD
Syracuse	Rushing	LeQuint Allen	15 rushes, 83 yards
Syracuse	Receiving	Oronde Gadsden II	6 receptions, 93 yards, 2 TD

=== vs. VMI (FCS) ===
Game Four – VMI Keydets (FCS) (0–2) vs Georgia Tech Yellow Jackets (2–1) – Game summary

Quarter	1	2	3	4	Total
Keydets (FCS)	0	0	0	7	7
Yellow Jackets	17	21	14	7	59

at Bobby Dodd Stadium, Atlanta, Georgia

- Date: Saturday September 14, 2024
- Game time: 3:30 PM
- Game weather: Rain • Temperature: 76 °F (24 °C)
- Game attendance: 31,729
- Referee: Tim Hedgepeth
- TV announcers (ACCNX): Shawn Kenney (play-by-play) and Forrest Conoly (analyst)

Game information

First quarter

- (7:39) GT − Aidan Birr 28-yard field goal (Drive: 8 plays, 50 yards, 2:14; Georgia Tech 3-0)
- (4:52) GT – Malik Rutherford 35-yard pass from Haynes King, Aidan Birr kick (Drive: 2 plays, 50 yards, 0:41; Georgia Tech 10-0)
- (0:08) GT – Zach Pyron 1-yard run, Aidan Birr kick (Drive: 7 plays, 73 yards, 3:13; Georgia Tech 17-0)

Second quarter

- (11:04) GT – Zach Pyron 1-yard run, Aidan Birr kick (Drive: 6 plays, 55 yards, 2:41; Georgia Tech 24-0)
- (1:49) GT – Eric Singleton Jr. 14-yard pass from Haynes King, Aidan Birr kick (Drive: 4 plays, 42 yards, 1:10; Georgia Tech 31-0)
- (0:30) GT – Avery Boyd 14-yard pass from Haynes King, Aidan Birr kick (Drive: 5 plays, 73 yards, 0:53; Georgia Tech 38-0)

Third quarter

- (7:38) GT – Trelain Maddox 3-yard run, Aidan Birr kick (Drive: 5 plays, 60 yards, 2:17; Georgia Tech 45-0)
- (1:32) GT – Leo Blackburn 24-yard pass from Zach Pyron, Aidan Birr kick (Drive: 3 plays, 40 yards, 1:19; Georgia Tech 52-0)

Fourth quarter

- (6:37) VMI – Ethen Horne 2-yard pass from Brady Hammonds, Caden Beck kick (Drive: 10 plays, 75 yards, 9:55; Georgia Tech 52-7)
- (4:29) GT – Anthony Carrie 2-yard run, Aidan Birr kick (Drive: 7 plays, 65 yards, 2:05; Georgia Tech 59-7)

Statistics	VMI	GT
First downs	5	30
Total yards	104	572
Rushing yards	12	190
Passing yards	92	382
Passing: Comp–Att–Int	13-19-0	23-32-0
Time of possession	30:16	24:44

Team	Category	Player	Statistics
VMI	Passing	Chandler Wilson	10/15, 51 yards
VMI	Rushing	JoJo Crump	5 rushes, 16 yards
VMI	Receiving	Owen Sweeney	1 reception, 34 yards
Georgia Tech	Passing	Haynes King	17/22, 275 yards, 3 TD
Georgia Tech	Rushing	Trelain Maddox	9 rushes, 53 yards, TD
Georgia Tech	Receiving	Eric Singleton Jr.	5 receptions, 102 yards, TD

=== at No. 19 Louisville ===
Game Five – Georgia Tech Yellow Jackets (3–1) vs No. 19 Louisville Cardinals (2–0) – Game summary

Quarter	1	2	3	4	Total
Yellow Jackets	7	7	3	2	19
No. 19 Cardinals	7	10	7	7	31

at L&N Federal Credit Union Stadium, Louisville, Kentucky

- Date: Saturday September 21, 2024
- Game time: 3:30 PM
- Game attendance: 50,727
- TV announcers (ESPN2): Mike Monaco (play-by-play), Kirk Morrison (analyst), and Dawn Davenport (sideline reporter)

Game information

First quarter

- (7:40) GT – Haynes King 23-yard run (Aidan Birr kick) (Drive: 6 plays, 65 yards, 2:34; Georgia Tech 7–0)
- (2:11) LOU – Ramon Puryear 0-yard fumble recovery (Brock Travelstead kick) (Tied 7–7)

Second quarter

- (11:20) LOU – Chris Bell 37-yard pass from Tyler Shough (Brock Travelstead kick) (Drive: 7 plays, 71 yards, 3:30; Louisville 14–7)
- (1:56) LOU – Brock Travelstead 27-yard field goal (Drive: 11 plays, 75 yards, 7:10; Louisville 17–7)
- (0:04) GT – Jamal Haynes 1-yard run (Aidan Birr kick) (Drive: 10 plays, 75 yards, 1:52; Louisville 17–14)

Third quarter

- (2:46) GT – Aidan Birr 26-yard field goal (Drive: 13 plays, 67 yards, 7:22; Tied 17–17)
- (1:43) LOU – Ja'Corey Brooks 57-yard pass from Tyler Shough (Brock Travelstead kick) (Drive: 3 plays, 75 yards, 1:03; Louisville 24–17)

Fourth quarter

- (11:23) GT – Team safety (Louisville 24–19)
- (7:05) LOU – Tayon Holloway 55-yard return of blocked field goal (Brock Travelstead kick) (Louisville 31–19)

Statistics	GT	LOU
First downs	18	14
Total yards	410	326
Rushing yards	98	57
Passing yards	312	269
Passing: Comp–Att–Int	21–32–0	13–19–0
Time of possession	31:50	28:10

Team	Category	Player	Statistics
Georgia Tech	Passing	Haynes King	21–32, 312 yards
Georgia Tech	Rushing	Haynes King	14 rushes, 58 yards, TD
Georgia Tech	Receiving	Malik Rutherford	7 receptions, 113 yards
Louisville	Passing	Tyler Shough	13–19, 269 yards, 2 TD
Louisville	Rushing	Donald Chaney	10 rushes, 23 yards
Louisville	Receiving	Ja'Corey Brooks	4 receptions, 125 yards, TD

=== vs. Duke ===
Game Six – Duke Blue Devils (5–0) vs Georgia Tech Yellow Jackets (3–2) – Game summary

Quarter	1	2	3	4	Total
Blue Devils	0	7	7	0	14
Yellow Jackets	7	3	0	14	24

at Bobby Dodd Stadium, Atlanta, Georgia

- Date: Saturday October 5, 2024
- Game time: 8:00 p.m.
- Game weather: Clear • Temperature: 73 °F (23 °C)
- Game attendance: 37,287
- Referee: Jerry Magallanes
- TV announcers (ACCN): Wes Durham (play-by-play), Tom Luginbill (analyst) and Dana Boyle (sideline)

Game information

First quarter

- (8:36) GT – Zach Pyron 2-yard run (Aidan Birr kick) (Drive: 12 plays, 60 yards, 6:16; Georgia Tech 7–0)

Second quarter

- (10:02) GT – Aidan Birr 23-yard field goal (Drive: 13 plays, 62 yards, 5:23; Georgia Tech 10–0)
- (00:26) DUKE – Eli Pancol 20-yard pass from Maalik Murphy (Todd Pelino kick) (Drive: 7 plays, 50 yards, 2:48; Georgia Tech 10–7)

Third quarter

- (2:53) DUKE – Sahmir Hagans 65-yard pass from Maalik Murphy (Todd Pelino kick) (Drive: 1 plays, 65 yards, 0:11; Duke 14–10)

Fourth quarter

- (10:40) GT – Jamal Haynes 3-yard pass from Haynes King (Aidan Birr kick) (Drive: 14 plays, 85 yards, 7:07; Georgia Tech 17–14)
- (6:36) GT – Eric Singleton Jr. 9-yard pass from Haynes King (Aidan Birr kick) (Drive: 7 plays, 70 yards, 3:13; Georgia Tech 24–14)

Statistics	DUKE	GT
First downs	15	25
Total yards	279	412
Rushing yards	74	245
Passing yards	205	167
Passing: Comp–Att–Int	18–31–1	23–31–0
Time of possession	20:33	39:27

Team	Category	Player	Statistics
Duke	Passing	Maalik Murphy	18-31-1, 205 yards, 2 TD, INT
Duke	Rushing	Star Thomas	14 rushes, 48 yards
Duke	Receiving	Sahmir Hagans	1 reception, 65 yards, TD
Georgia Tech	Passing	Haynes King	23-31, 167 yards, 2 TD
Georgia Tech	Rushing	Jamal Haynes	19 rushes, 128 yards
Georgia Tech	Receiving	Malik Rutherford	8 receptions, 76 yards

=== at North Carolina ===
Game Seven – Georgia Tech Yellow Jackets (4–2) vs North Carolina Tar Heels (3–3) – Game summary

Quarter	1	2	3	4	Total
Yellow Jackets	7	13	7	14	41
Tar Heels	7	7	10	10	34

at Kenan Memorial Stadium, Chapel Hill, North Carolina

- Date: Saturday October 12, 2024
- Game time: 12:00 p.m.
- Game weather: Sunny 68 °F (20 °C) • Wind: W 6 miles per hour (9.7 km/h)
- Game attendance: 44,482
- Referee: Mike Roche
- TV announcers (The CW): Thom Brennaman (play-by-play), Max Browne (analyst), and Traevor Scales (sideline reporter)

Game information

First quarter

- (6:12) GT - Chad Alexander 2 yard rush (Aidan Birr kick) (Drive: 6 plays, 38 yards, 2:50) GT 7–0
- (2:36) UNC - Jacolby Criswell 1 yard rush (Noah Burnette kick) (Drive: 3 plays, 78 yards, 1:00) 7–7

Second quarter

- (7:36) GT - Aidan Birr 26 yard field goal (Drive: 13 plays, 66 yards, 6:26) GT 10–7
- (1:54) GT - Haynes King 20 yard rush (Aidan Birr kick) (Drive: 8 plays, 62 yards, 3:31) GT 17–7
- (0:34) UNC - JJ Jones 4 yard pass from Jacolby Criswell (Noah Burnette kick) (Drive: 4 plays, 75 yards, 1:20) GT 17–14
- (0:03) GT - Aidan Birr 29 yard field goal (Drive: 5 plays, 63 yards, 0:31) GT 20–14

Third quarter

- (6:46) GT - Haynes King 7 yard rush (Aidan Birr kick) (Drive: 8 plays, 67 yards, 4:19) GT 27–14
- (2:47) UNC - Noah Burnette 50 yard field goal (Drive: 9 plays, 28 yards, 3:50) GT 27–17
- (1:10) UNC - Alijah Huzzie 69 yard punt return (Noah Burnette kick) GT 27–24

Fourth quarter

- (11:18) GT - Jamal Haynes 4 yard rush (Aidan Birr kick) (Drive: 10 plays, 75 yards, 4:52) GT 34–24
- (3:27) UNC - Jacolby Criswell 1 yard rush (Noah Burnette kick) (Drive: 13 plays, 68 yards, 5:32) GT 34–31
- (0:44) UNC - Noah Burnette 26 yard field goal (Drive: 9 plays, 56 yards, 1:01) 34–34
- (0:16) GT - Jamal Haynes 68 yard rush (Aidan Birr kick) (Drive: 2 plays, 75 yards, 0:28) GT 41–34

Statistics	GT	UNC
First downs	25	21
Total yards	505	417
Rushing yards	371	201
Passing yards	134	216
Passing: Comp–Att–Int	12-23-0	18-34-0
Time of possession	33:30	26:30

Team	Category	Player	Statistics
Georgia Tech	Passing	Haynes King	11-22, 127 yards
Georgia Tech	Rushing	Jamal Haynes	19 rushes, 170 yards, 2 TD
Georgia Tech	Receiving	Luke Harpring	2 receptions, 36 yards
North Carolina	Passing	Jacolby Criswell	17-31, 209 yards, TD
North Carolina	Rushing	Omarion Hampton	18 rushes, 137 yards
North Carolina	Receiving	J.J. Jones	3 receptions, 64 yards, TD

=== vs. No. 12 Notre Dame ===
Game Eight – No. 12 Notre Dame Fighting Irish (5–1) vs Georgia Tech Yellow Jackets (5–2) – Game summary

Quarter	1	2	3	4	Total
No. 12 Fighting Irish	0	14	7	10	31
Yellow Jackets	7	0	0	6	13

at Mercedes-Benz Stadium, Atlanta, Georgia

- Date: Saturday October 19, 2024
- Game time: 3:30 p.m.
- Game weather: Temperature: 71 °F (22 °C) • Wind: N/A • Weather: Sunny (roof open)
- Game attendance: 59,021
- Referee: Gary Patterson
- TV announcers (ESPN): Bob Wischusen (play-by-play), Louis Riddick (analyst), and Kris Budden (sideline reporter)

Game information

First quarter

- (0:00) GT – Jamal Haynes 1-yard run, Aidan Birr kick (Drive: 13 plays, 71 yards, 7:06; Georgia Tech 7–0)

Second quarter

- (7:00) ND – Riley Leonard 1-yard run, Zac Yoakam kick (Drive: 14 plays, 75 yards, 8:00; Tied 7–7)
- (1:53) ND – Riley Leonard 12-yard run, Zac Yoakam kick (Drive: 5 plays, 68 yards, 2:51; Notre Dame 14–7)

Third quarter

- (11:01) ND – Jeremiyah Love 1-yard run, Zac Yoakam kick (Drive: 6 plays, 60 yards, 3:10; Notre Dame 21–7)

Fourth quarter

- (10:01) ND – Zac Yoakam 42-yard field goal (Drive: 11 plays, 32 yards, 3:59; Notre Dame 24–7)
- (2:37) ND – Adon Shuler 36-yard interception, Zac Yoakam kick (Drive: 1 play, 0 yards, 0:10; Notre Dame 31–7)
- (0:23) GT – Chase Lane 6-yard pass from Zach Pyron, Two-point conversion failed (Drive: 9 plays, 80 yards, 2:08; Notre Dame 31–13)

Statistics	ND	GT
First downs	23	18
Total yards	69–385	67–333
Rushing yards	39–168	29–64
Passing yards	217	269
Passing: Comp–Att–Int	21–30–1	20–38–2
Time of possession	35:45	24:15

Team	Category	Player	Statistics
Notre Dame	Passing	Riley Leonard	20/29, 203 yards, INT
Notre Dame	Rushing	Jadarian Price	8 carries, 69 yards
Notre Dame	Receiving	Jeremiyah Love	3 receptions, 57 yards
Georgia Tech	Passing	Zach Pyron	20/36, 269 yards, TD, 2 INT
Georgia Tech	Rushing	Zach Pyron	13 carries, 45 yards
Georgia Tech	Receiving	Abdul Janneh	1 reception, 60 yards

=== at Virginia Tech (rivalry) ===
Game Nine – Georgia Tech Yellow Jackets (5–3) vs Virginia Tech Hokies (4–3) – Game summary

Quarter	1	2	3	4	Total
Yellow Jackets	3	3	0	0	6
Hokies	0	14	7	0	21

at Lane Stadium, Blacksburg, Virginia

- Date: Saturday October 26, 2024
- Game time: 12:00 p.m.
- Game weather: Cloudy • Temperature: 65 °F (18 °C) • Wind: W 6 miles per hour (9.7 km/h)
- Game attendance: 65,632
- Referee: Stuart Mullins
- TV announcers (ACCN): Chris Cotter (play-by-play), Mark Herzlich (analyst) and Coley Harvey (sideline)

Game information

First quarter

- (7:00) GT – Aidan Birr 34-yard field goal (Drive: 12 plays, 59 yards, 5:52; Georgia Tech 3–0)

Second quarter

- (13:02) VT – Benji Gosnell 20-yard pass from Kyron Drones, John Love kick (Drive: 4 plays, 72 yards, 1:46; Virginia Tech 7–3)
- (5:39) GT – Aidan Birr 51-yard field goal (Drive: 9 plays, 36 yards, 3:51; Virginia Tech 7–6)
- (1:51) VT – Kyron Drones 6-yard pass from Jaylin Lane, John Love kick (Drive: 9 plays, 75 yards, 3:48; Virginia Tech 14–6)

Third quarter

- (4:50) VT – Kyron Drones 1-yard run, John Love kick (Drive: 5 plays, 42 yards, 1:46; Virginia Tech 21–6)

Fourth quarter

No scoring plays

Statistics	GT	VT
First downs	17	11
Total yards	356	233
Rushing yards	96	99
Passing yards	260	134
Passing: Comp–Att–Int	21–48–2	17–28–0
Time of possession	32:03	27:57

Team	Category	Player	Statistics
Georgia Tech	Passing	Aaron Philo	11/26, 184 yards, INT
Georgia Tech	Rushing	Jamal Haynes	18 carries, 47 yards
Georgia Tech	Receiving	Malik Rutherford	6 receptions, 53 yards
Virginia Tech	Passing	Kyron Drones	16/27, 128 yards, TD
Virginia Tech	Rushing	Bhayshul Tuten	17 carries, 79 yards
Virginia Tech	Receiving	Benji Gosnell	5 receptions, 59 yards, TD

=== vs. No. 4 Miami (FL) ===
Game Ten – No. 4 Miami (FL) Hurricanes (9–0) vs Georgia Tech Yellow Jackets (5–4) – Game summary

Quarter	1	2	3	4	Total
No. 4 Hurricanes	10	0	6	7	23
Yellow Jackets	7	7	7	7	28

at Bobby Dodd Stadium, Atlanta, Georgia

- Date: Saturday November 9, 2024
- Game time: 12:00 p.m.
- Game weather: Sunny
- Game attendance: 47,358
- Referee: Mike Roche
- TV announcers (ESPN): Bob Wischusen (play-by-play), Louis Riddick (analyst), and Kris Budden (sideline reporter)

Game information

First quarter

- (12:49) GT – Jamal Haynes 16-yard run, Aidan Birr kick (Drive: 4 plays, 85 yards, 2:06; Georgia Tech 7–0)
- (11:59) MIA – Elijah Arroyo 74-yard pass from Cam Ward, Andres Borregales kick (Drive: 2 plays, 75 yards, 0:50; Tied 7–7)
- (7:47) MIA – Andres Borregales 41-yard field goal (Drive: 8 plays, 44 yards, 2:35; Miami 10–7)

Second quarter

- (12:02) GT – Malik Rutherford 5-yard pass from Haynes King, Aidan Birr kick (Drive: 17 plays, 75 yards, 10:45; Georgia Tech 14–10)

Third quarter

- (6:46) GT – Chase Lane 15-yard pass from Aaron Philo, Aidan Birr kick (Drive: 8 plays, 61 yards, 4:27; Georgia Tech 21–10)
- (2:43) MIA – Isaiah Horton 8-yard pass from Cam Ward, two-point conversion failed (Drive: 9 plays, 83 yards, 3:58; Georgia Tech 21–16)

Fourth quarter

- (13:09) GT – Haynes King 5-yard run, Aidan Birr kick (Drive: 9 plays, 75 yards, 4:34; Georgia Tech 28–16)
- (6:07) MIA – Xavier Restrepo 38-yard pass from Cam Ward, Andres Borregales kick (Drive: 7 plays, 78 yards, 2:17; Georgia Tech 28–23)

Statistics	MIA	GT
First downs	23	18
Total yards	436	370
Rushing yards	88	271
Passing yards	348	99
Passing: Comp–Att–Int	25-39-0	11-16-0
Time of possession	25:11	34:49

Team	Category	Player	Statistics
Miami (FL)	Passing	Cam Ward	25/39, 348 yards, 3 TD
Miami (FL)	Rushing	Damien Martinez	15 rushes, 81 yards
Miami (FL)	Receiving	Jacolby George	7 receptions, 88 yards
Georgia Tech	Passing	Aaron Philo	5/10, 67 yards, TD
Georgia Tech	Rushing	Haynes King	20 rushes, 93 yards, TD
Georgia Tech	Receiving	Malik Rutherford	4 receptions, 28 yards, TD

=== vs. NC State ===
Game Eleven – NC State Wolfpack (5–5) vs Georgia Tech Yellow Jackets (6–4) – Game summary

Quarter	1	2	3	4	Total
Wolfpack	7	0	0	22	29
Yellow Jackets	7	6	3	14	30

at Bobby Dodd Stadium, Atlanta, Georgia

- Date: Thursday November 21, 2024
- Game time: 7:30 PM
- Game weather: Sunny • Temperature: 44 °F (7 °C)
- Game attendance: 34,591
- Referee: Stuart Mullins
- TV announcers (ESPN): Matt Barrie (play-by-play), Dan Mullen (analyst) and Harry Lyles Jr. (sideline)

Game information

First quarter

- (7:18) GT – E. J. Lightsey 21-yard interception return, Aidan Birr kick (Georgia Tech 7–0)
- (2:27) NCSU – CJ Bailey 16-yard run, Kanoah Vinesett kick (Drive: 9 plays, 75 yards, 4:51; Tied 7–7)

Second quarter

- (12:29) GT – Aidan Birr 44-yard field goal (Drive: 10 plays, 49 yards, 4:58; Georgia Tech 10–7)
- (5:16) GT – Aidan Birr 41-yard field goal (Drive: 11 plays, 43 yards, 6:17; Georgia Tech 13–7)

Third quarter

- (3:55) GT – Aidan Birr 45-yard field goal (Drive: 7 plays, 60 yards, 3:34; Georgia Tech 16–7)

Fourth quarter

- (14:47) NCSU – CJ Bailey 28-yard run, Kanoah Vinesett kick (Drive: 7 plays, 75 yards, 4:08; Georgia Tech 16–14)
- (6:40) GT – Haynes King 3-yard run, Aidan Birr kick (Drive: 1 play, 3 yards, 0:04; Georgia Tech 23–14)
- (4:07) NCSU – CJ Bailey 1-yard run, Kanoah Vinesett kick (Drive: 6 plays, 75 yards, 2:33; Georgia Tech 23–21)
- (1:30) NCSU – Hollywood Smothers 52-yard run, Kanoah Vinesett kick (Drive: 4 plays, 72 yards, 1:00; NC State 29–23)
- (0:22) GT – Aaron Philo 18-yard run, Aidan Birr kick (Drive: 7 plays, 75 yards, 1:08; Georgia Tech 30–29)

Statistics	NCST	GT
First downs	16	19
Total yards	400	391
Rushing yards	253	119
Passing yards	147	272
Passing: Comp–Att–Int	17–30–3	22–36–1
Time of possession	26:40	33:20

Team	Category	Player	Statistics
NC State	Passing	CJ Bailey	17/30, 147 yards, 3 INT
NC State	Rushing	CJ Bailey	9 carries, 83 yards, 3 TD
NC State	Receiving	Jordan Waters	3 receptions, 45 yards
Georgia Tech	Passing	Aaron Philo	19/33, 265 yards, INT
Georgia Tech	Rushing	Aaron Philo	7 carries, 57 yards, TD
Georgia Tech	Receiving	Eric Singleton Jr.	5 receptions, 106 yards

=== at No. 7 Georgia (Clean, Old-Fashioned Hate) ===
Game Twelve – Georgia Tech Yellow Jackets (7–4) vs No. 7 Georgia Bulldogs (9–2) – Game summary

Quarter	1	2	3	4	OT	2OT	3OT	4OT	5OT	6OT	7OT	8OT	Total
Yellow Jackets	3	14	0	10	7	6	0	0	2	0	0	0	42
No. 7 Bulldogs	0	0	6	21	7	6	0	0	2	0	0	2	44

at Sanford Stadium, Athens, Georgia

- Date: Friday November 29, 2024
- Game time: 7:30 PM
- Game weather: Clear • Temperature: 43 °F (6 °C)
- Game attendance: 93,033
- Referee: Jeff Heaser
- TV announcers (ABC): Joe Tessitore (play-by-play), Jesse Palmer (analyst), and Katie George (sideline reporter)

Game information

First quarter

- (10:35) GT – Aidan Birr 31-yard field goal (Drive: 8 plays, 61 yards, 4:22; Georgia Tech 3–0)

Second quarter

- (4:40) GT - Haynes King 2-yard run, Aidan Birr kick (Drive: 8 plays, 66 yards 3:57; Georgia Tech 10–0)
- (0:30) GT - Jamal Haynes 4-yard pass from Haynes King, Aidan Birr kick (Drive: 11 plays, 62 yards 2:30; Georgia Tech 17–0)

Third quarter

- (9:53) UGA – Oscar Delp 2-yard pass from Carson Beck, (2 point conversion failed)(Drive: 6 plays, 51 yards, 2:39; Georgia Tech 17–7)

Fourth quarter

- (14:17) GT – Aidan Birr 23-yard field goal (Drive: 18 plays, 90 yards, 10:36; Georgia Tech 20–6)
- (8:18) UGA – Nate Frazier 1-yard run, Peyton Woodring kick (Drive: 13 plays, 75 yards, 5:59; Georgia Tech 20–13)
- (5:37) GT - Haynes King 11-yard run, Aidan Birr kick (Drive: 6 plays, 75 yards 2:41; Georgia Tech 27–13)
- (3:39) UGA – Dominic Lovett 17-yard pass from Carson Beck, Peyton Woodring kick (Drive: 8 plays, 75 yards, 1:58; Georgia Tech 27–20)
- (1:01) UGA – Dominic Lovett 3-yard pass from Carson Beck, Peyton Woodring kick (Drive: 5 plays, 32 yards, 1:04; Tied 27–27)

Overtime 1

- UGA – Landon Humphreys 14-yard pass from Carson Beck, Peyton Woodring kick (Drive: 4 plays, 25 yards; Georgia 34–27)
- GT – Eric Singleton 12-yard pass from Haynes King, Aidan Birr kick (Drive: 4 plays, 25 yards; Tied 34–34)

Overtime 2

- GT - Haynes King 1-yard run, (Two point conversion failed)(Drive: 3 plays 25 yards; Georgia Tech 40–34)
- UGA - Cash Jones 25-yard pass from Caron Beck, (Two point conversion failed)(Drive: 1 play, 25 yards, Tied 40–40)

Overtime 3

No Score

Overtime 4

No Score

Overtime 5

- UGA - Carson Beck pass to Dillon Bell for two point conversion (Georgia 42–40)
- GT - Haynes King pass to Malik Rutherford for two point conversion (Tied 42–42)

Overtime 6

No Score

Overtime 7

No Score

Overtime 8

- UGA - Nate Frazier run for two point conversion (Georgia 44–42)

Statistics	GT	UGA
First downs	28	24
Total yards	563	405
Rushing yards	260	108
Passing yards	303	297
Passing: Comp–Att–Int	26–37–0	28–43–0
Time of possession	37:11	22:49

Team	Category	Player	Statistics
Georgia Tech	Passing	Haynes King	26/36, 303 yards, 2 TD
Georgia Tech	Rushing	Haynes King	24 carries, 110 yards, 3 TD
Georgia Tech	Receiving	Eric Singleton Jr.	8 receptions, 86 yards, 1 TD
Georgia	Passing	Carson Beck	28/43, 297 yards, 5 TD
Georgia	Rushing	Nate Frazier	11 carries, 50 yards, 1 TD
Georgia	Receiving	Cash Jones	4 receptions, 53 yards, 1 TD

=== vs. Vanderbilt (Birmingham Bowl / rivalry) ===
2024 Birmingham Bowl
Georgia Tech Yellow Jackets (7–5) vs Vanderbilt Commodores (6–6) – Game summary

Quarter	1	2	3	4	Total
Yellow Jackets	0	10	3	14	27
Commodores	7	7	7	14	35

at Protective Stadium • Birmingham, Alabama

- Date: Friday, December 27, 2024
- Game time: 3:30 p.m. EST
- Game weather: Cloudy • Temperature: 59 °F (15 °C)
- Game attendance: 33,840
- Referee: Mark Kluczynski
- TV announcers (ESPN): Dave Neal (play-by-play), Aaron Murray (analyst), and Ashley ShahAhmadi (sideline)

Game information

First Quarter

- (2:26) VAN – Cole Spence 7 yard pass from Diego Pavia, Brock Taylor kick (Drive: 8 plays, 87 yards, 4:40; Vanderbilt 7–0)

Second Quarter

- (10:06) GT – Ryland Goede 2 yard pass from Haynes King, Aidan Birr kick (Drive: 15 plays, 75 yards, 7:20; Tied 7–7)
- (1:55) VAN – Diego Pavia 2 yard run, Brock Taylor kick (Drive: 14 plays, 81 yards, 8:11; Vanderbilt 14–7)
- (0:08) GT – Aidan Birr 43 yard field goal (Drive: 9 plays, 49 yards, 1:47; Vanderbilt 14–10)

Third Quarter

- (8:34) GT – Aidan Birr 33 yard field goal (Drive: 8 plays, 46 yards, 3:51; Vanderbilt 14–13)
- (0:56) VAN – Eli Stowers 3 yard pass from Diego Pavia, Brock Taylor kick (Drive: 5 plays, 56 yards, 2:20; Vanderbilt 21–13)

Fourth Quarter

- (14:55) VAN – Quincy Skinner 7 yard pass from Diego Pavia, Brock Taylor kick (Drive: 3 plays, 11 yards, 0:49; Vanderbilt 28–13)
- (9:59) VAN – Diego Pavia 6 yard run, Brock Taylor kick (Drive: 6 plays, 73 yards, 3:41; Vanderbilt 35–13)
- (5:03) GT – Jamal Haynes 9 yard pass from Haynes King, Aidan Birr kick (Drive: 11 plays, 75 yards, 4:56; Vanderbilt 35–20)
- (1:30) GT – Bailey Stockton 2 yard pass from Haynes King, Aidan Birr kick (Drive: 11 plays, 83 yards, 2:36; Vanderbilt 35–27)

Statistics	GT	VAN
First downs	24	20
Total yards	394	306
Rushing yards	190	146
Passing yards	204	160
Passing: Comp–Att–Int	25–33–1	13–21–0
Time of possession	28:50	31:10

Team	Category	Player	Statistics
Georgia Tech	Passing	Haynes King	25/33, 204 yards, 3 TD, INT
Georgia Tech	Rushing	Jamal Haynes	17 carries, 136 yards
Georgia Tech	Receiving	Abdul Janneh	3 receptions, 34 yards
Vanderbilt	Passing	Diego Pavia	13/21, 160 yards, 3 TD
Vanderbilt	Rushing	Diego Pavia	17 carries, 84 yards, 2 TD
Vanderbilt	Receiving	Eli Stowers	4 receptions, 55 yards, TD

== Roster ==
2024 Georgia Tech Yellow Jackets football team roster
Players
Coaches
Offense

Pos.	#	Name	Class
WR	1	Leo Blackburn	RJr
WR	2	Eric Singleton Jr.	So
RB	3	Trey Cooley	Sr
WR	4	Abdul Janneh	RSr
QB	5	Zach Pyron	RSo
RB	6	Anthony Carrie	Fr
WR	7	Chase Lane	RSr
WR	8	Malik Rutherford	RJr
WR	9	Avery Boyd	Sr
QB	10	Haynes King	RJr
RB	11	Jamal Haynes	RJr
QB	12	Aaron Philo	Fr
WR	13	Isiah Canion	Fr
QB	14	Graham Knowles	Fr
TE	15	Luke Harpring	Fr
QB	16	Brody Rhodes	RJr
TE	17	Josh Beetham	RJr
WR	18	Zion Taylor	Fr
QB	20	Ben Guthrie	Fr
RB	21	Daylon Gordon	RJr
WR	24	Trent Davis	RJr
WR	25	Nick Bliss	Fr
RB	26	Evan Dickens	Fr
RB	27	Chad Alexander	So
RB	28	Trelain Maddox	Fr
WR	29	Judson Petty	Fr
OL	47	Joshua Ruder	Fr
OL	50	Tana Alo-Tupuola	Fr
OL	52	Harrison Moore	Fr
OL	54	Jordan Williams	Sr
OL	55	Corey Robinson II	RJr
OL	56	Jacob Benjamin	Fr
OL	58	Brandon Best	RSo
OL	60	Nick Pearson	Fr
OL	64	Ryan Purves	RSo
OL	67	Joe Fusile	RJr
OL	68	Bobby Campbell	Fr
OL	70	Jameson Riggs	Fr
OL	71	Jordan Brown	RJr
OL	72	Weston Franklin	Sr
OL	73	Patrick Screws Jr.	Fr
OL	74	Benjamin Galloway	Fr
OL	76	Kai Greer	Fr
OL	77	Keylan Rutledge	Jr
OL	78	Ethan Mackenny	So
OL	79	Jordan Floyd	Fr
TE	80	Brett Seither	RSr
WR	81	Trey Horne	Fr
TE	82	Jackson Long	RSo
TE	83	Blake Ragsdale	Fr
TE	84	David Prince	Fr
TE	85	Jackson Hawes	RSr
TE	86	Ryland Goede	RSr
WR	87	Bailey Stockton	Fr
WR	89	Chris Elko	Fr

Defense

Pos.	#	Name	Class
LB	0	Trenilyas Tatum	Sr
DB	1	LaMiles Brooks	Sr
LB	2	E. J. Lightsey	RSo
DB	3	Ahmari Harvey	RJr
DB	4	Warren Burrell	RSr
DB	5	Clayton Powell-Lee	Jr
DB	6	Rodney Shelley	Jr
DB	7	Taye Seymore	So
DL	8	Makius Scott	Sr
DL	9	Romello Height	RJr
DL	11	Kevin Harris II	Sr
DL	13	Horace Lockett	RSo
DB	14	Nehemiah Chandler	Fr
LB	15	Tah'j Butler	Fr
DB	16	Syeed Gibbs	RSo
LB	17	Jackson Hamilton	RJr
DB	18	Troy Stevenson IV	Fr
DB	20	Christian Pritchett	Fr
DB	21	Omar Daniels	RJr
DB	22	D. J. Moore	RSo
DB	23	Zachary Tobe	So
DB	24	Jayden Davis	Fr
DB	25	Cedric Franklin II	Fr
DB	26	Ben Hollerbach	So
DL	27	Joshua Robinson	Sr
LB	28	Austin Dean	RJr
DB	29	Nico Dowdell	Fr
DB	30	Lawson Pritchett	Fr
LB	31	Jonorian Foots	Fr
DL	32	Sylvain Yondjouen	RSr
LB	34	Myles Forristall	Fr
LB	35	Jacob Cruz	So
DB, LS	36	Kace Adams	Fr
DB	37	Joseph Moseley	Fr
DB	38	A. J. Cheeks	Fr
DB	39	Will Kiker	Fr
LB	42	Luke Laughter	Fr
LB	44	Kyle Efford	RSo
LB	45	Bayler Duncan	Fr
DL	49	Chuma Okoye	Fr
LB	51	Nacari Ashley	Fr
LB	53	Jack Collins	Fr
LB	54	Caleb Dozier	Fr
DL	57	Cade Adams	Fr
DL	59	Thomas Gore	RSr
DL	88	Zeek Biggers	Sr
DL	90	Jordan Boyd	Fr
DL	91	Jaaymen Rochell	RSo
DL	92	Ty Thompson	RSo
LB	93	Drew Cohen	Fr
DL	94	Uche Iloh	Fr
DL	95	Jason Jones	RJr
DL	96	Shymeik Jones	Fr
DL	97	Landen Marshall	Fr
DL	98	Amontrae Bradford	Fr
DL	99	Jordan van den Berg	RJr

Special teams

Pos.	#	Name	Class
K	33	Aidan Birr	RSo
P, K	39	James Whatley	Fr
P	40	Joshua Taylor	Fr
P	43	David Shanahan	Sr
K, P	45	Andrew Nelms	Fr
LS	46	Henry Freer	RSr
LS	48	Joseph Stoever	Fr
LS	49	Ronnie Thomas	RSo
LS	59	Will Scissum	RSr

Head coach

- Brent Key

Coordinators/assistant coaches

- Buster Faulkner – Offensive coordinator, tight ends
- Chris Weinke – Assistant head coach, co-offensive coordinator, quarterbacks
- Norval McKenzie – Running backs, run game coordinator
- Geep Wade – Offensive line
- Trent McKnight – Wide receivers
- Tyler Santucci – Defensive coordinator, linebackers
- Ricky Brumfield – Associate head coach for special teams, cornerbacks
- Jess Simpson – Defensive line
- Cory Peoples – Defensive backs
- Kyle Pope – Outside linebackers, defensive ends

Legend

- (C) Team captain
- (S) Suspended
- (I) Ineligible
- Injured
- Redshirt

Roster
Last update: 12 August 2024
