= Desmond Jennings =

American baseball player (born 1986)

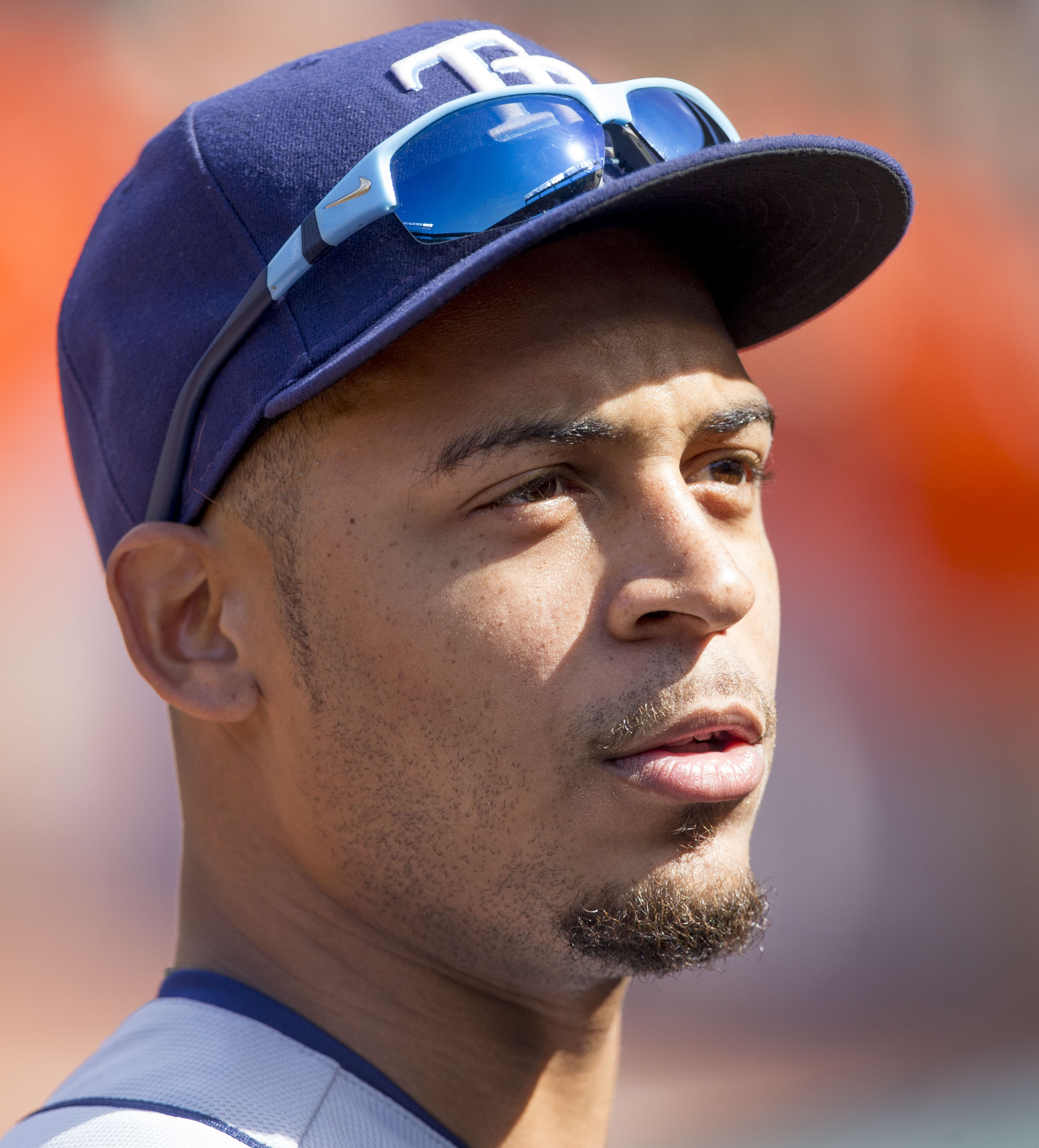
- Jennings with the Rays in 2014
- Outfielder
- Born: October 30, 1986 (age 40); Birmingham, Alabama, U.S.
- Batted: Right Threw: Right

MLB debut
- September 1, 2010, for the Tampa Bay Rays

Last MLB appearance
- August 2, 2016, for the Tampa Bay Rays

MLB statistics
- Batting average: .245
- Home runs: 55
- Runs batted in: 191
- Stats at Baseball Reference

Teams
- Tampa Bay Rays (2010–2016)

Desmond Delane Jennings (born October 30, 1986) is an American former professional baseball outfielder. He played in Major League Baseball (MLB) for the Tampa Bay Rays.

== Early life ==
Jennings was born in Birmingham, Alabama, the second of three sons born to Edmond and Paulette Jennings. He is a cousin of NFL lineman Andre Smith. At Pinson Valley High School in Pinson, Alabama, Jennings lettered in baseball, football and basketball. He received an offer from the Georgia Bulldogs to play both baseball and football collegiately.

Jennings was selected by the Cleveland Indians in the 18th round of the 2005 amateur draft out of Pinson Valley High School but did not sign. After failing to qualify academically for the University of Alabama, Jennings decided to enroll at Itawamba Community College to play baseball and football; he led all junior college wide receivers with 54 receptions while scoring 6 touchdowns and netting 848 yards in 8 games. On the diamond, he hit .378 with 29 steals. Jennings was picked by the Tampa Bay Devil Rays in the 10th round of the 2006 amateur draft and signed.

== Professional career ==
=== Tampa Bay Rays ===
Jennings was the Rays' fifth-best prospect heading into the 2009 season according to Baseball America, and the 18th-best prospect overall in their midseason top 25.

Jennings was named to the 2010 All-Star Futures Game. From 2008 to 2011, Jennings was a top-100 prospect in baseball in each preseason ranking of both Baseball America and Baseball Prospectus. He peaked at sixth overall in Baseball America's pre-2010 ranking.

In 2010, Jennings batted .278 for the season with the Triple-A Durham Bulls, and .190 in 21 at-bats with Tampa Bay.

Jennings was called up from Triple-A Durham on July 23, 2011, as the Rays optioned Reid Brignac to Durham. At the time of his call-up, Jennings was batting .275 and leading the International League in runs scored, with 68. On July 28, 2011, Jennings blasted his first career home run, a two-run shot against the Oakland Athletics. On September 7, 2011, Jennings hit his first career walk-off home run off Mark Lowe to give the Rays a 5-4 win over the Texas Rangers and give them their 1,000th win in franchise history.

With the departure of B.J. Upton to Atlanta, Jennings began the 2013 season as the starting center fielder and lead-off hitter, with Sam Fuld as his backup. On August 3, Jennings fractured his left middle finger, and was placed on the disabled list 3 days later. Jennings returned on August 19, and finished the season with Tampa Bay. In 139 games, he hit .252/.334/.414 with 14 home runs, 54 RBI, 82 runs scored and 20 stolen bases. He led the team in triples (6) and stolen bases.

On May 7, 2013, Jennings hit a line drive which hit Toronto Blue Jays pitcher J. A. Happ in the head. Happ needed to be carried off the field on a stretcher after an 11-minute delay. Jennings was visibly shaken by the accident but remained in the game.

On May 3, 2015, Jennings was placed on the 15-day disabled list due to left knee bursitis.

On August 26, 2016, The Rays announced that Jennings would be released the next day. Over his seven-year career with the Tampa Bay Rays, he batted .245 with 55 home runs, 191 RBI, and 95 stolen bases.

=== New York Mets ===
On February 9, 2017, Jennings signed a minor league contract with the Cincinnati Reds organization. He was released by Cincinnati prior to the start of the season on March 31.

On April 5, 2017, Jennings signed a minor league contract with the New York Mets; he was subsequently assigned to their Triple-A affiliate, the Las Vegas 51s. In 55 appearances for Las Vegas, he slashed .237/.301/.416 with eight home runs, 25 RBI, and three stolen bases. Jennings was released by the Mets organization on June 16.

=== Acereros de Monclova ===
On April 11, 2018, Jennings signed with the Acereros de Monclova of the Mexican League. In 34 appearances for Monclova, he batted .300/.373/.564 with 10 home runs and 38 RBI. Jennings became a free agent following the season.

== Coaching career ==
On February 7, 2025, the Philadelphia Phillies hired Jennings to serve as the development and assistant hitting coach for their Single-A affiliate, the Clearwater Threshers.
