= Pinson Valley High School =

Four-year public high school in Birmingham, Alabama, United States

Coordinates: 33°42′12.25″N 86°40′10.32″W

Location
- 6895 Highway 75 North; Pinson, Alabama 35126; United States

Information
- Type: Public
- Established: 1972 (54 years ago)
- School board: Jefferson County Schools
- CEEB code: 012183
- Principal: Gerolyn Woodruff
- Teaching staff: 60.00 (FTE)
- Grades: 9–12
- Enrollment: 1,021 (2023–2024)
- Student to teacher ratio: 17.02
- Campus: Suburban
- Colors: Garnet, gold, white, and black
- Athletics: AHSAA Class 6A
- Nickname: Indians
- Feeder schools: Rudd Middle School
- Website: www.jefcoed.com/o/pinsonvalleyhs

Pinson Valley High School (PVHS) is a four-year public high school in the Birmingham, Alabama suburb of Pinson. It is the fifth largest of the Jefferson County Board of Education's fourteen high schools. School colors are garnet and gold, and the athletic teams are called the Indians. PVHS competes in AHSAA Class 6A athletics.

== Student profile ==
Enrollment in grades 9–12 for the 2013–14 school year is 1,028 students. Approximately 51% of students are white, 37% are African-American, 10% are Hispanic, and 2% are Asian-American. Roughly 42% of students qualify for free or reduced price lunch.

PVHS has a graduation rate of 83%. Approximately 75% of its students meet or exceed state proficiency standards in mathematics, and 78% meet or exceed standards in reading. The average ACT score for PVHS students is 22.

== Notable alumni ==
- Marcus Brimage, mixed martial artist
- Coty Clarke, basketball player
- Zach Cunningham, football player
- Terry Hoeppner, football coach
- Desmond Jennings, baseball player
- Tez Johnson, football player
- Colby Jones, basketball player
- Terry Jones, baseball player
- Kool-Aid McKinstry, football player
- TJ Metcalf, football player
- Bo Nix, football player
- Zach Pyron, football player
- Shay Shelnutt, Alabama State Senator
- Amare Thomas, football player
- Melinda Toole Gunter, former Miss Alabama
- Phil Sims, Texas Governor's Ombudsman
