= Eric Singleton Jr. =

American football player

No. 2 – Florida Gators
- Position: Wide receiver
- Class: Senior

Personal information
- Born: August 28, 2005 (age 21)
- Listed height: 5 ft 10 in (1.78 m)
- Listed weight: 182 lb (83 kg)

Career information
- High school: Alexander (Douglasville, Georgia)
- College: Georgia Tech (2023–2024); Auburn (2025); Florida (2026–present)
- Stats at ESPN

Eric Singleton Jr. is an American college football wide receiver for the Florida Gators. He previously played for the Georgia Tech Yellow Jackets and Auburn Tigers.

== Early life ==
Singleton Jr. attended Robert S. Alexander High School in Douglasville, Georgia. During his high school career, he had 101 receptions, 1,567 receiving yards and 16 touchdowns. A three star prospect, he originally committed to play college football at Western Kentucky University before flipping to Georgia Tech.

== College career ==
As a true freshman at Georgia Tech in 2023, Singleton Jr. was named a freshman All-American after starting 10 of 12 games and recording 48 receptions for 714 yards and six touchdowns. He returned to Georgia Tech for his sophomore season in 2024.

On December 9, 2024, Singleton announced that he would enter the transfer portal. On December 23, 2024, Singleton announced that he plans to attend and play football at Auburn University.

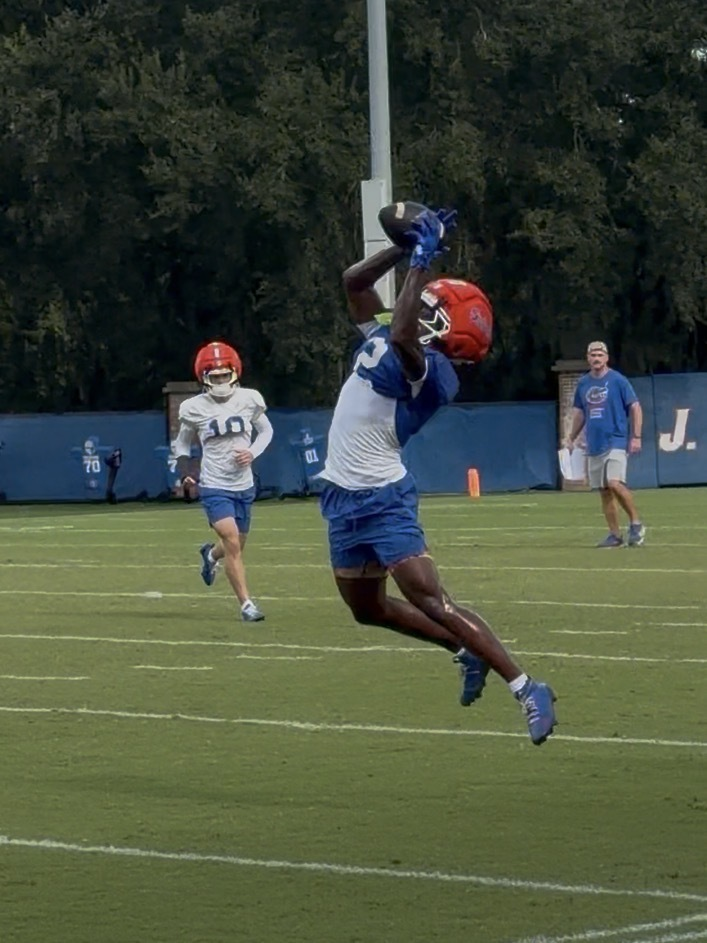
Eric Singleton Jr catching a ball at practice with the Florida Gators ahead of the 2026 season

=== Statistics ===
Season	Team	Games		Receiving				Rushing			
Season	Team	GP	GS	Rec	Yds	Avg	TD	Att	Yds	Avg	TD
2023	Georgia Tech	12	10	48	714	14.9	6	1	9	9.0	0
2024	Georgia Tech	12	10	56	754	13.5	3	21	131	6.2	1
2025	Auburn	12	12	58	534	9.2	3	14	61	4.4	0
2026	Florida	0	0	0	0	0.0	0	0	0	0.0	0
Career		27	26	148	2,257	15.3	26	8	67	8.4	2

== Personal life ==
Singleton's cousin Darvin Adams was also a wide receiver at Auburn and was the leading receiver on Auburn's 2010 National Championship team.
