= Pinson, Alabama =

City in Alabama, United States

- City
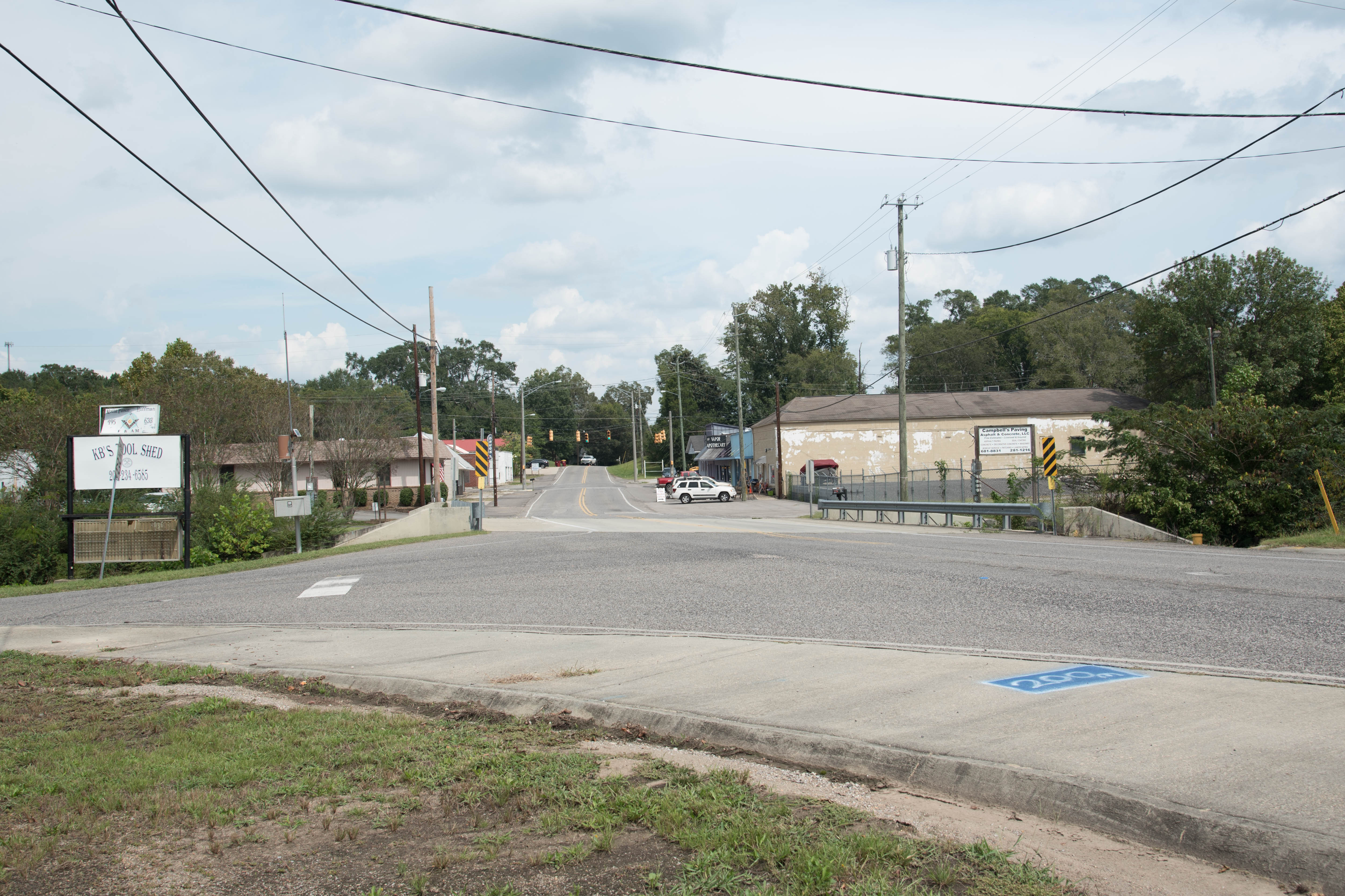
- Downtown Pinson

- Flag Seal

- Location of Pinson in Jefferson County, Alabama.
- Coordinates: 33°41′10″N 86°40′54″W
- Country: United States
- State: Alabama
- County: Jefferson
- Established: 2004

Area
  - Total: 11.59 sq mi (30.02 km^{2})
  - Land: 11.56 sq mi (29.95 km^{2})
  - Water: 0.027 sq mi (0.07 km^{2})
- Elevation: 663 ft (202 m)

Population (2020)
  - Total: 7,215
  - Density: 624.0/sq mi (240.91/km^{2})
- Time zone: UTC-6 (Central (CST))
  - Summer (DST): UTC-5 (CDT)
- ZIP code: 35126, 35123, 35215
- Area codes: 205 & 659
- FIPS code: 01-60648
- GNIS feature ID: 2424931
- Website: pinsonal.gov

Pinson is a city in Jefferson County near Birmingham, Alabama, United States, northwest of Center Point. As of the 2020 census, Pinson had a population of 7,215.

== History ==
Pinson was incorporated in March 2004.

In October 2025, a bonfire shooting occurred in a wooden area of the town, in which four people were shot including two teenagers. High school cheerleader Kimber Mills died following severe injuries sustained from the shooting and she was taken off life support at the UAB Hospital two days later. Additionally, she was an organ donor and an honor walk was held at the hospital that same day.

== Geography ==
According to the U.S. Census Bureau, the community has a total area of 7.0 square miles (18 km^{2}), of which 7.0 square miles (18 km^{2}) is land and 0.04 square miles (0.10 km^{2}) (0.43%) is water.

Pinson is located in an area of SW–NE parallel ridges, with occasional rock outcrops, especially toward the east-facing ridge crests. Pinson is home to the Turkey Creek Nature Preserve and the Alabama Butterbean Festival.

The Palmerdale Homesteads are located within the city limits of Pinson. The Palmerdale Homesteads were the first of five farmers' resettlement communities built in Alabama under President Franklin Roosevelt's New Deal in the 1930s. The first of the 102 homesteads were completed in 1935. A community store and elementary school/community center were completed in 1937 to serve the farming community.

=== Climate ===
Climate data for Pinson, Alabama, 1991–2020 normals, extremes 1951–2014
Month	Jan	Feb	Mar	Apr	May	Jun	Jul	Aug	Sep	Oct	Nov	Dec	Year
Record high °F (°C)	80 (27)	84 (29)	91 (33)	94 (34)	97 (36)	103 (39)	109 (43)	107 (42)	101 (38)	96 (36)	89 (32)	81 (27)	109 (43)
Mean maximum °F (°C)	71.5 (21.9)	76.2 (24.6)	83.8 (28.8)	88.0 (31.1)	90.8 (32.7)	95.4 (35.2)	97.4 (36.3)	97.8 (36.6)	94.3 (34.6)	87.6 (30.9)	79.9 (26.6)	72.2 (22.3)	99.4 (37.4)
Mean daily maximum °F (°C)	53.5 (11.9)	58.3 (14.6)	66.6 (19.2)	74.9 (23.8)	81.5 (27.5)	87.5 (30.8)	90.2 (32.3)	89.7 (32.1)	85.2 (29.6)	75.0 (23.9)	64.0 (17.8)	55.7 (13.2)	73.5 (23.1)
Daily mean °F (°C)	42.3 (5.7)	46.3 (7.9)	53.8 (12.1)	61.2 (16.2)	68.9 (20.5)	76.0 (24.4)	79.3 (26.3)	78.8 (26.0)	73.3 (22.9)	62.4 (16.9)	51.3 (10.7)	44.7 (7.1)	61.5 (16.4)
Mean daily minimum °F (°C)	31.0 (−0.6)	34.3 (1.3)	40.9 (4.9)	47.5 (8.6)	56.4 (13.6)	64.5 (18.1)	68.4 (20.2)	67.8 (19.9)	61.4 (16.3)	49.7 (9.8)	38.7 (3.7)	33.8 (1.0)	49.5 (9.7)
Mean minimum °F (°C)	11.4 (−11.4)	15.7 (−9.1)	21.2 (−6.0)	29.2 (−1.6)	40.4 (4.7)	52.3 (11.3)	60.2 (15.7)	58.8 (14.9)	44.3 (6.8)	31.1 (−0.5)	22.9 (−5.1)	14.8 (−9.6)	7.9 (−13.4)
Record low °F (°C)	−8 (−22)	1 (−17)	2 (−17)	23 (−5)	31 (−1)	38 (3)	49 (9)	49 (9)	33 (1)	20 (−7)	12 (−11)	−2 (−19)	−8 (−22)
Average precipitation inches (mm)	5.11 (130)	5.39 (137)	5.71 (145)	5.04 (128)	4.77 (121)	4.58 (116)	4.98 (126)	4.45 (113)	3.96 (101)	3.28 (83)	4.64 (118)	5.11 (130)	57.02 (1,448)
Average snowfall inches (cm)	0.2 (0.51)	0.3 (0.76)	0.8 (2.0)	0.0 (0.0)	0.0 (0.0)	0.0 (0.0)	0.0 (0.0)	0.0 (0.0)	0.0 (0.0)	0.0 (0.0)	0.0 (0.0)	0.1 (0.25)	1.4 (3.52)
Average precipitation days (≥ 0.01 in)	10.4	10.0	10.1	7.8	9.1	10.0	10.7	8.2	6.2	5.8	7.9	9.9	106.0
Average snowy days (≥ 0.1 in)	0.3	0.4	0.3	0.0	0.0	0.0	0.0	0.0	0.0	0.0	0.0	0.2	1.2
Source 1: NOAA
Source 2: National Weather Service (mean maxima/minima 1981–2010)

== Demographics ==
Historical population
Census	Pop.	Note	%±
1990	10,987		—
2000	5,033		−54.2%
2010	7,163		42.3%
2020	7,215		0.7%
U.S. Decennial Census; 2013 Estimate

Note: Census demographic data were enumerated for the Census-Designated Place (CDP) for somewhat different boundaries prior to incorporation in 2004. The 1990 population of 10,987 was for the CDP of Pinson-Clay-Chalkville, which was subdivided in 2000 into their own separate CDPs. Therefore, exact population for the Pinson portion in 1990 cannot be ascertained

=== Racial and ethnic composition ===
Pinson city, Alabama – Racial and ethnic composition Note: the US Census treats Hispanic/Latino as an ethnic category. This table excludes Latinos from the racial categories and assigns them to a separate category. Hispanics/Latinos may be of any race.
Race / Ethnicity (NH = Non-Hispanic)	Pop 2000	Pop 2010	Pop 2020	% 2000	% 2010	% 2020
White alone (NH)	4,432	5,572	3,982	88.06%	77.79%	55.19%
Black or African American alone (NH)	414	1,213	2,373	8.23%	16.93%	32.89%
Native American or Alaska Native alone (NH)	15	15	14	0.30%	0.21%	0.19%
Asian alone (NH)	20	32	37	0.40%	0.45%	0.51%
Native Hawaiian or Pacific Islander alone (NH)	1	2	2	0.02%	0.03%	0.03%
Other race alone (NH)	1	2	17	0.02%	0.03%	0.24%
Mixed race or Multiracial (NH)	36	60	224	0.72%	0.84%	3.10%
Hispanic or Latino (any race)	114	267	566	2.27%	3.73%	7.84%
Total	5,033	7,163	7,215	100.00%	100.00%	100.00%

=== 2020 census ===
As of the 2020 census, Pinson had a population of 7,215. There were 2,725 households, including 1,997 families. The median age was 39.5 years. 22.7% of residents were under the age of 18 and 15.6% were 65 years of age or older. For every 100 females there were 89.3 males, and for every 100 females age 18 and over there were 85.6 males.

88.2% of residents lived in urban areas, while 11.8% lived in rural areas.

Of all households, 33.8% had children under the age of 18 living in them. 50.1% were married-couple households, 14.3% had a male householder with no spouse or partner present, and 30.0% had a female householder with no spouse or partner present. About 23.1% of all households were made up of individuals, and 10.0% had someone living alone who was 65 years of age or older.

There were 2,963 housing units, of which 8.0% were vacant. The homeowner vacancy rate was 1.5% and the rental vacancy rate was 15.5%.

=== 2010 census ===
At the 2010 census, there were 7,163 people, 2,731 households, and 2,074 families living in the community. The population density was 1,023.3 inhabitants per square mile (395.1/km^{2}). There were 2,948 housing units at an average density of 421.1 per square mile (162.6/km^{2}). The racial makeup of the community was 79.0% White, 17.0% Black or African American, 0.2% Native American, 0.4% Asian, 0.0% Pacific Islander, 2.2% from other races, and 1.0% from two or more races. 3.7% of the population were Hispanic or Latino of any race.

Of the 2,731 households 32.0% had children under the age of 18 living with them, 58.0% were married couples living together, 13.7% had a female householder with no husband present, and 24.1% were non-families. 20.9% of households were one person and 6.5% were one person aged 65 or older. The average household size was 2.62 and the average family size was 3.04.

The age distribution was 24.4% under the age of 18, 8.0% from 18 to 24, 27.8% from 25 to 44, 27.9% from 45 to 64, and 11.9% 65 or older. The median age was 38 years. For every 100 females, there were 91.7 males. For every 100 females age 18 and over, there were 89.9 males.

The median household income was $56,863 and the median family income was $63,221. Males had a median income of $41,719 versus $36,066 for females. The per capita income for the community was $23,902. About 4.5% of families and 5.7% of the population were below the poverty line, including 8.1% of those under age 18 and 3.2% of those age 65 or over.

=== 2000 census ===
At the 2000 census, there were 5,033 people, 1,853 households, and 1,450 families living in the community. The population density was 721.2 inhabitants per square mile (278.5/km^{2}). There were 1,953 housing units at an average density of 279.8 per square mile (108.0/km^{2}). The racial makeup of the community was 8.33% Black or African American, 88.1% White, 0.32% Native American, 0.40% Asian, 0.02% Pacific Islander, 0.34% from other races, and 0.76% from two or more races. 2.27% of the population were Hispanic or Latino of any race.

Of the 1,853 households 41.4% had children under the age of 18 living with them, 59.8% were married couples living together, 15.3% had a female householder with no husband present, and 21.7% were non-families. 19.0% of households were one person and 6.3% were one person aged 65 or older. The average household size was 2.71 and the average family size was 3.08.

The age distribution was 28.3% under the age of 18, 9.7% from 18 to 24, 31.7% from 25 to 44, 20.6% from 45 to 64, and 9.8% 65 or older. The median age was 33 years. For every 100 females, there were 93.5 males. For every 100 females age 18 and over, there were 88.8 males.

The median household income was $39,583 and the median family income was $48,707. Males had a median income of $33,843 versus $25,112 for females. The per capita income for the community was $17,704. About 8.6% of families and 10.3% of the population were below the poverty line, including 12.2% of those under age 18 and 10.9% of those age 65 or over.

== Education ==
Jefferson County Schools:

- Pinson Valley High School – located on Highway 75 in Pinson. Grades 9–12
- Rudd Middle School – grades 6–8
- Kermit Johnson Elementary – grades 3–5
- Pinson Elementary School – grades K–2

== Media ==
One newspaper serves Pinson: The Trussville Tribune, a weekly newspaper based in nearby Trussville, which publishes on Wednesdays. Previously, Pinson was served by The North Jefferson News based in Gardendale, which closed in 2020 shortly after the COVID-19 pandemic began; and The Birmingham News, the former daily major metro-area newspaper that first cut back to three print editions per week, then closed the newspaper entirely and went to a digital-only format with a greatly-reduced staff.

== Notable people ==
- Ed Chandler – former Major League Baseball player
- Nico Collins – wide receiver for the Houston Texans
- William Engesser – film actor
- Samantha Francis – contestant on America's Next Top Model cycle 8, international model
- Terry Hoeppner – assistant coach at Pinson (1974–75)
- Desmond Jennings – Major League Baseball player
- Terry Jones – former outfielder for two teams
- Bo Nix – Quarterback for the Denver Broncos
- Melinda Toole – former Miss Alabama
- Kevin Palacios — former Soccer player
