= Haynes King (American football) =

American football player (born 2001)

No. 16 – Carolina Panthers
- Position: Quarterback
- Roster status: Active

Personal information
- Born: January 9, 2001 (age 25); Longview, Texas, U.S.
- Listed height: 6 ft 2 in (1.88 m)
- Listed weight: 212 lb (96 kg)

Career information
- High school: Longview (Longview, Texas)
- College: Texas A&M (2020–2022); Georgia Tech (2023–2025)
- NFL draft: 2026: undrafted

Career history
- Carolina Panthers (2026–present)

Awards and highlights
- Earl Campbell Tyler Rose Award (2025); ACC Player of the Year (2025); ACC Offensive Player of the Year (2025); First-team All-ACC (2025)
- Stats at Pro Football Reference

Haynes King (born January 9, 2001) is an American professional football quarterback for the Carolina Panthers of the National Football League (NFL). He played college football for the Texas A&M Aggies and Georgia Tech Yellow Jackets. He was signed as an undrafted free agent by the Panthers in 2026.

== Early life ==
King attended Longview High School in Longview, Texas. As a senior, he was selected to the 2020 Under Armour All-American Game. He committed to Texas A&M University to play college football.

As junior in 2018, King led the Lobos to their first state title in 81 years. He played under his father, John King, who has been the head coach at Longview High School since 2004.

=== Statistics ===
Year	GP	Passing								Rushing			
Year	GP	Cmp	Att	Pct	Yds	Y/A	TD	Int	Rtg	Att	Yds	Avg	TD
2017	14	93	176	.528	1,662	17.9	20	5	111.5	19	222	11.7	2
2018	16	184	266	.692	3,879	21.1	42	4	145.1	77	664	8.6	8
2019	12	123	213	.577	1,996	16.2	20	8	104.9	55	506	9.2	10
Career	42	400	655	.611	7,537	18.8	82	17	129.7	151	1,392	9.2	20

== College career ==
=== Texas A&M ===
King played in two games as a backup quarterback to Kellen Mond his first year at Texas A&M in 2020. Prior to the 2021 season, he was named the team's starting quarterback.

On September 11, 2021 against Colorado, King suffered a lower right leg injury on a scramble in the first quarter and was out for the remainder of the game; he was replaced by sophomore Zach Calzada. On the Monday following the game, head coach Jimbo Fisher stated that King had a fractured leg and would be out indefinitely.

On December 2, 2022, King entered the transfer portal.

=== Georgia Tech ===
On December 18, 2022, it was reported King had transferred to Georgia Tech. In his first start at Georgia Tech in 2023, King went 19 of 32 for 313 passing yards and 3 touchdowns but had a fumble and interception as they lost 39–34 against Louisville. King led the Yellow Jackets to a 6–6 regular season record and a win in the Gasparilla Bowl against UCF.

King and the Jackets went 7–5 in the 2024 regular season, ending the regular season in a controversial 44-42 8OT loss to rival Georgia, in which King passed for 303 yards and 2 touchdowns. They subsequently lost in the Birmingham Bowl to Vanderbilt. King finished 10th in the 2025 Heisman Trophy voting after a 9–3 regular season with notable wins over Clemson and ACC champion Duke, winning ACC player of the year and the Earl Campbell Tyler Rose Award. King's final game was 25–21 loss in the Pop-Tarts Bowl to BYU.

=== Statistics ===
Season	Team	Games			Passing								Rushing			
Season	Team	GP	GS	Record	Cmp	Att	Pct	Yds	Y/A	TD	Int	Rtg	Att	Yds	Avg	TD
2020	Texas A&M	2	0	—	2	4	50.0	59	14.8	1	1	206.4	6	43	7.2	0
2021	Texas A&M	2	2	2−0	22	35	62.9	300	8.6	2	3	136.6	6	24	4.0	0
2022	Texas A&M	6	5	1−4	104	187	55.6	1,220	6.5	7	6	116.4	29	83	2.9	1
2023	Georgia Tech	13	13	7–6	226	367	61.6	2,842	7.7	27	16	142.2	120	737	6.1	10
2024	Georgia Tech	11	11	7–4	196	269	72.9	2,114	7.9	14	2	154.6	125	587	4.7	11
2025	Georgia Tech	12	12	8–4	252	361	69.8	2,951	8.2	14	6	147.9	185	953	5.2	15
Career		46	43	25–18	802	1,223	65.6	9,486	7.8	65	34	142.7	471	2,427	5.2	37

== Professional career ==
Pre-draft measurables
Height	Weight	Arm length	Hand span	Wingspan	40-yard dash	10-yard split	20-yard split	20-yard shuttle	Three-cone drill	Vertical jump	Broad jump
6 ft 2 3/8 in (1.89 m)	212 lb (96 kg)	31 7/8 in (0.81 m)	9 in (0.23 m)	6 ft 4 1/2 in (1.94 m)	4.46 s	1.56 s	2.58 s	4.17 s	6.89 s	33.5 in (0.85 m)	9 ft 8 in (2.95 m)
All values from NFL Combine

On April 25, 2026, King was signed as an undrafted free agent by the Carolina Panthers after the conclusion of the 2026 NFL draft. King played in the 2026 Pro Football Hall of Fame Game and led the Panthers to a 33–30 victory over the Arizona Cardinals with a rushing touchdown as time expired.
