= 2026 Tulsa Golden Hurricane football team =

American college football season

2026 Tulsa Golden Hurricane football
- Conference: American Conference
- Record: 7–4 (4–3 American)
- Head coach: Tre Lamb (2nd season)
- Offensive coordinator: Kevin Barbay (1st season)
- Co-offensive coordinator: Ty Darlington (2nd season)
- Offensive scheme: Spread
- Defensive coordinator: Josh Reardon (2nd season)
- Co-defensive coordinator: Mike Gray (2nd season)
- Base defense: 4–2–5
- Home stadium: Skelly Field at H. A. Chapman Stadium

2026 American Conference football standings
	Conf.			Overall
Team	W		L	W		L
UTSA	6	–	1	9	–	2
Memphis	5	–	2	8	–	3
East Carolina	5	–	2	7	–	4
North Texas	5	–	2	7	–	4
UAB	4	–	3	6	–	5
Army	4	–	3	5	–	5
Tulsa	4	–	3	7	–	4
Florida Atlantic	4	–	3	7	–	4
Tulane	4	–	3	6	–	5
Navy	3	–	4	4	–	6
South Florida	2	–	5	6	–	5
Rice	1	–	6	2	–	9
Charlotte	1	–	6	1	–	10
Temple	1	–	6	2	–	9
Championship: December 5, 2026
As of November 22, 2026; Rankings from AP poll

The 2026 Tulsa Golden Hurricane football team is the program that represents the University of Tulsa playing as a member of the American Conference during the 2026 NCAA Division I FBS football season. Led by second-year head coach Tre Lamb, the Golden Hurricane play their home games at Skelly Field at H. A. Chapman Stadium in Tulsa, Oklahoma.

== Schedule ==
Date	Time	Opponent	Site	TV	Result	Attendance
September 5	2:45 p.m.	Oklahoma State*	Skelly Field at H. A. Chapman Stadium; Tulsa, OK (rivalry)	ESPNU	W 24–10	28,520
September 12	6:00 p.m.	at Sam Houston*	Bowers Stadium; Huntsville, TX	ESPN+	W 23–17	13,781
September 19	7:00 p.m.	East Texas A&M*	Skelly Field at H. A. Chapman Stadium; Tulsa, OK	ESPN+	W 42–0	16,288
September 26	7:00 p.m.	at Arkansas*	Donald W. Reynolds Razorback Stadium; Fayetteville, AR	SECN+	L 6–34	72,890
October 1	8:00 p.m.	North Texas	Skelly Field at H. A. Chapman Stadium; Tulsa, OK	ESPN	L 44–45 ^{OT}	14,938
October 10	2:30 p.m.	at Navy	Navy–Marine Corps Memorial Stadium; Annapolis, MD	CBSSN	L 26–34	30,963
October 17	3:30 p.m.	at Rice	First Community Stadium; Houston, TX	ESPN+	W 38–17	14,626
October 23	7:30 p.m.	Army	Skelly Field at H. A. Chapman Stadium; Tulsa, OK	ESPN2	L 35–38	20,247
November 7	11:00 a.m.	at Tulane	Yulman Stadium; New Orleans, LA	ESPNU	W 60–10	27,539
November 14	6:15 p.m.	Florida Atlantic^{†}	Skelly Field at H. A. Chapman Stadium; Tulsa, OK	ESPN+	W 38–21	17,384
November 21	1:00 p.m.	Charlotte	Skelly Field at H. A. Chapman Stadium; Tulsa, OK	ESPN+	W 42–14	13,686
November 27	11:00 a.m.	at UTSA	Alamodome; San Antonio, TX	ESPN		
*Non-conference game; ^{†}Homecoming; All times are in Mountain time

== Game summaries ==
=== Oklahoma State (rivalry) ===
Oklahoma State Cowboys (0–0) at Tulsa Golden Hurricane (0–0) – Game summary

Quarter	1	2	3	4	Total
Cowboys	0	3	7	0	10
Golden Hurricane	3	7	7	7	24

at Skelly Field at H. A. Chapman Stadium • Tulsa, Oklahoma

- Date: September 5
- Game time: 2:45 p.m.
- Game weather: Sunny • Temperature: 97 °F (36 °C) • Wind: SE at 5 miles per hour (8.0 km/h)
- Game attendance: 28,520
- Referee: Michael VanderVelde
- TV announcers (ESPNU): Mike Corey (play-by-play) and Barrett Brooks (analyst)

Game information

First quarter

- (2:18) TLSA ― Marlon Hauck 40-yard field goal (Drive: 9 plays, 75 yards, 5:30; Tulsa 3–0)

Second quarter

- (2:04) OKST ― Sam Keltner 35-yard field goal (Drive: 8 plays, 62 yards, 3:21; Tied 3–3)
- (0:21) TLSA ― Damari Alston 1-yard run, Marlon Hauck Kick (Drive: 8 plays, 75 yards, 1:43; Tulsa 10–3)

Third quarter

- (7:00) TLSA ― Oran Singleton 21-yard pass from Baylor Hayes; Owen Carey kick (Drive: 6 plays, 59 yards, 3:10; Tulsa 17–3)
- (1:52) OKST ― Miles Coleman 16-yard pass from Drew Mestemaker, Sam Keltner kick (Drive: 11 plays, 75 yards, 5:08; Tulsa 17–10)

Fourth quarter

- (7:52) TLSA ― Damari Alston 29-yard run, Owen Carey kick (Drive: 2 plays, 34 yards, 0:46; Tulsa 24–10)

Statistics	OKST	TLSA
First downs	27	15
Plays–yards	86−368	57–361
Rushes–yards	37–127	33–134
Passing yards	241	227
Passing: comp–att–int	29–49–2	17–24–1
Turnovers	4	1
Time of possession	31:05	28:55

Team	Category	Player	Statistics
Oklahoma State	Passing	Drew Mestemaker	29/49, 241 yards, TD, 2 INT
Oklahoma State	Rushing	Caleb Hawkins	18 carries, 79 yards
Oklahoma State	Receiving	Wyatt Young	8 receptions, 84 yards
Tulsa	Passing	Baylor Hayes	17/24, 227 yards, TD, INT
Tulsa	Rushing	Damari Alston	15 carries, 73 yards, 2 TD
Tulsa	Receiving	Oran Singleton Jr.	4 receptions, 99 yards, TD

=== at Sam Houston ===
Tulsa Golden Hurricane (1–0) at Sam Houston Bearkats (0–1) – Game summary

Quarter	1	2	3	4	Total
Golden Hurricane	0	10	13	0	23
Bearkats	7	7	3	0	17

at Bowers Stadium • Huntsville, Texas

- Date: September 12
- Game time: 6:00 p.m. CDT
- Game weather: Sunny • Temperature: 95 °F (35 °C) • Wind: SE at 8 MPH
- Game attendance: 13,781
- Referee: Matt Overton
- TV announcers (ESPN+): Jason Metko (play-by-play), John Harris (analyst) and Kendra Sheehan (sideline reporter)

Game information

First quarter

- SHSU – Chris Reed 39-yard pass from Landyn Locke (Sam Carpenter kick), 12:02. Bearkats 7–0. Drive: 6 plays, 75 yards, 2:58.

Second quarter

- TLSA – Trequan Jones 3-yard run (Owen Carey kick), 13:57. Tied 7–7. Drive: 8 plays, 62 yards, 2:37.
- SHSU – Jerrian Parker Jr. 94-yard pass from Landyn Locke (Sam Carpenter kick), 6:48. Bearkats 14–7. Drive: 1 play, 94 yards, 0:12.
- TLSA – Owen Carey 41-yard field goal, 2:12. Bearkats 14–10. Drive: 11 plays, 44 yards, 4:31.

Third quarter

- TLSA – Tristan Lawyer 56-yard run (kick failed), 10:10. Golden Hurricane 16–14. Drive: 11 plays, 80 yards, 4:46.
- TLSA – Trequan Jones 81-yard run (Owen Carey kick), 7:22. Golden Hurricane 23–14. Drive: 2 plays, 89 yards, 0:25.
- SHSU – Sam Carpenter 39-yard field goal, 1:02. Golden Hurricane 23–17. Drive: 13 plays, 59 yards, 6:14.

Fourth quarter

- No scoring plays.

Statistics	TLSA	SHSU
First downs	18	19
Plays–yards	73–367	66–371
Rushes–yards	40–241	31–55
Passing yards	126	316
Passing: comp–att–int	16–33–0	24–35–0
Turnovers	0	1
Time of possession	30:18	29:42

Team	Category	Player	Statistics
Tulsa	Passing	Baylor Hayes	16/29, 126 yards
Tulsa	Rushing	Trequan Jones	9 carries, 125 yards, 2 TD
Tulsa	Receiving	Damari Alston	5 receptions, 39 yards
Sam Houston	Passing	Landyn Locke	24/34, 316 yards, 2 TD
Sam Houston	Rushing	Alton McCaskill	14 carries, 48 yards
Sam Houston	Receiving	Jerrian Parker Jr.	2 receptions, 101 yards, TD

=== East Texas A&M (FCS) ===
East Texas A&M Lions (1–2) at Tulsa Golden Hurricane (2–0) – Game summary

Quarter	1	2	3	4	Total
Lions (FCS)	0	0	0	0	0
Golden Hurricane	7	7	14	14	42

at Skelly Field at H. A. Chapman Stadium • Tulsa, Oklahoma

- Date: September 19
- Game time: 7:00 p.m. CDT
- Game weather: Sunny • Temperature: 97 °F (36 °C) • Wind: N at 11 MPH
- Game attendance: 16,288
- Referee: Matt Beck
- TV announcers (ESPN+): Chad McKee (play-by-play) and Reggie Walker (analyst)

Statistics	ETAM	TLSA
First downs	16	23
Plays–yards	71–288	70–450
Rushes–yards	32–125	44–286
Passing yards	163	164
Passing: comp–att–int	19–39–1	14–26–0
Time of possession	30:18	29:42

Team	Category	Player	Statistics
East Texas A&M	Passing	Reese Mooney	10/19, 85 yards
East Texas A&M	Rushing	Major McBride	10 carries, 53 yards
East Texas A&M	Receiving	Micah Simpson	5 receptions, 41 yards
Tulsa	Passing	Dexter Williams II	14/26, 164 yards, 3 TD
Tulsa	Rushing	Seth Davis	9 carries, 90 yards, TD
Tulsa	Receiving	Oran Singleton Jr.	2 receptions, 38 yards, TD

=== at Arkansas ===
Tulsa Golden Hurricane (3–0) at Arkansas Razorbacks (1–2) – Game summary

Quarter	1	2	3	4	Total
Golden Hurricane	0	0	6	0	6
Razorbacks	10	6	7	11	34

at Donald W. Reynolds Razorback Stadium • Fayetteville, Arkansas

- Date: September 26
- Game time: 7:00 p.m. CDT
- Game weather: Cloudy • Temperature: 78 °F (26 °C) • Wind: W 6 mph (9.7 km/h)
- Game attendance: 72,890
- Referee: Ted Pitts
- TV announcers (SECN+): Richard Cross (play-by-play) and Charlie Strong (analyst)

Statistics	TLSA	ARK
First downs	12	24
Plays–yards	55–241	79–441
Rushes–yards	23–65	43–132
Passing yards	176	309
Passing: comp–att–int	20–32–0	24–36–1
Turnovers	2	1
Time of possession	22:29	37:31

Team	Category	Player	Statistics
Tulsa	Passing	Dexter Williams II	20/32, 176 yards
Tulsa	Rushing	Damari Alston	9 carries, 27 yards, TD
Tulsa	Receiving	Donnell Gee Jr.	4 receptions, 49 yards
Arkansas	Passing	KJ Jackson	24/36, 309, TD, INT
Arkansas	Rushing	Cam Settles	11 carries, 40 yards
Arkansas	Receiving	Chris Marshall	9 receptions, 195 yards, TD

=== North Texas ===
North Texas Mean Green (2–2) at Tulsa Golden Hurricane (3–1) – Game summary

Quarter	1	2	3	4	OT	Total
Mean Green	3	7	21	7	7	45
Golden Hurricane	0	17	7	14	6	44

at Skelly Field at H. A. Chapman Stadium • Tulsa, Oklahoma

- Date: October 1
- Game time: 8:00 p.m. CDT
- Game attendance: 14,938
- TV: ESPN

Statistics	UNT	TLSA
First downs	27	22
Plays–yards	84-559	80-352
Rushes–yards	45-227	37-141
Passing yards	332	211
Passing: comp–att–int	24-39-2	25-43-0
Time of possession	34:42	25:18

Team	Category	Player	Statistics
North Texas	Passing	Tayven Jackson	24/39, 322 Yds, 4TD, 2INT
North Texas	Rushing	Jahiem White	32 Carries, 219Yds, TD
North Texas	Receiving	Max Resse	5 Rec, 101 Yds, TD
Tulsa	Passing	Baylor Hayes	25/43, 211 Yds, 3TD
Tulsa	Rushing	Damari Alston	23 Carries, 79 Yds, TD
Tulsa	Receiving	Oran Singleton Jr.	11 Rec, 104 Yds

=== at Navy ===
Tulsa Golden Hurricane (3–2) at Navy Midshipmen (1–3) – Game summary

Quarter	1	2	3	4	Total
Golden Hurricane	14	6	6	0	26
Midshipmen	7	7	6	14	34

at Navy–Marine Corps Memorial Stadium • Annapolis, Maryland

- Date: October 10
- Game time: 2:30 p.m. CDT
- Game weather: Cloudy • Temperature: 71 °F (22 °C) • Wind: NE at 5 mph
- Game attendance: 30,963
- Referee: Reid Jackson
- TV announcers (CBSSN): John Sadak (play-by-play), Randy Cross (analyst) and Brandon Baylor (sideline)

Statistics	TLSA	NAVY
First downs	16	24
Plays–yards	67–376	74–481
Rushes–yards	28–98	67–386
Passing yards	278	95
Passing: comp–att–int	22–39–0	5–7–1
Time of possession	25:29	34:31

Team	Category	Player	Statistics
Tulsa	Passing	Baylor Hayes	21/38, 268 Yds, TD
Tulsa	Rushing	Javon Ross	2 Carries, 36 Yds
Tulsa	Receiving	Javon Ross	7 Rec, 90 Yds
Navy	Passing	Jackson Gutierrez	5/7, 95 Yds, TD, INT
Navy	Rushing	Jackson Gutierrez	41 Carries, 232 Yds, 3 TD
Navy	Receiving	Truman Brasfield	1 Rec, 58 Yds, TD

=== at Rice ===
Tulsa Golden Hurricane (3–3) at Rice Owls (1–5) – Game summary

Quarter	1	2	3	4	Total
Golden Hurricane	0	21	3	14	38
Owls	7	10	0	0	17

at First Community Stadium • Houston, Texas

- Date: October 17
- Game time: 3:30 PM CDT
- TV: ESPN+

Statistics	TLSA	RICE
First downs	22	19
Plays–yards	63-401	62-351
Rushes–yards	36-152	54-289
Passing yards	249	62
Passing: comp–att–int	20-27-0	4-8-0
Time of possession	30:28	29:32

Team	Category	Player	Statistics
Tulsa	Passing	Baylor Hayes	20/27, 249 Yds, 3TD
Tulsa	Rushing	Trequan Jones	12 Carries, 77 Yds, TD
Tulsa	Receiving	Oran Singleton Jr.	7 Rec, 87 Yds, TD
Rice	Passing	Jacurri Brown	2/6, 47 Yds
Rice	Rushing	Jacurri Brown	11 Carries, 154 Yds, 2TD
Rice	Receiving	Jordan Clark	3 Rec, 52 Yds

=== Army ===
Army Black Knights (4–2) at Tulsa Golden Hurricane (4–3) – Game summary

Quarter	1	2	Total
Black Knights			0
Golden Hurricane			0

at Skelly Field at H. A. Chapman Stadium • Tulsa, Oklahoma

- Date: October 23
- Game time: 7:30 p.m. CDT
- TV announcers (ESPN2): Courtney Lyle play by play & Rene Ingoglia analyst

Statistics	ARMY	TLSA
First downs		
Plays–yards		
Rushes–yards		
Passing yards		
Passing: comp–att–int		
Time of possession		

Team	Category	Player	Statistics
Army	Passing		
Army	Rushing		
Army	Receiving		
Tulsa	Passing		
Tulsa	Rushing		
Tulsa	Receiving		

=== at Tulane ===
Tulsa Golden Hurricane (4–4) at Tulane Green Wave (4–4) – Game summary

Quarter	1	2	Total
Golden Hurricane			0
Green Wave			0

at Yulman Stadium • New Orleans, Louisiana

- Date: November 7
- Game time: TBD

Statistics	TLSA	TULN
First downs		
Plays–yards		
Rushes–yards		
Passing yards		
Passing: comp–att–int		
Time of possession		

Team	Category	Player	Statistics
Tulsa	Passing		
Tulsa	Rushing		
Tulsa	Receiving		
Tulane	Passing		
Tulane	Rushing		
Tulane	Receiving		

=== Florida Atlantic ===
Florida Atlantic Owls (6–3) at Tulsa Golden Hurricane (5–4) – Game summary

Quarter	1	2	Total
Owls			0
Golden Hurricane			0

at Skelly Field at H. A. Chapman Stadium • Tulsa, Oklahoma

- Date: November 14
- Game time: TBD

Statistics	FAU	TLSA
First downs		
Plays–yards		
Rushes–yards		
Passing yards		
Passing: comp–att–int		
Time of possession		

Team	Category	Player	Statistics
Florida Atlantic	Passing		
Florida Atlantic	Rushing		
Florida Atlantic	Receiving		
Tulsa	Passing		
Tulsa	Rushing		
Tulsa	Receiving		

=== Charlotte ===
Charlotte 49ers (1–9) at Tulsa Golden Hurricane (6–4) – Game summary

Quarter	1	2	Total
49ers			0
Golden Hurricane			0

at Skelly Field at H. A. Chapman Stadium • Tulsa, Oklahoma

- Date: November 21
- Game time: TBD

Statistics	CLT	TLSA
First downs		
Plays–yards		
Rushes–yards		
Passing yards		
Passing: comp–att–int		
Time of possession		

Team	Category	Player	Statistics
Charlotte	Passing		
Charlotte	Rushing		
Charlotte	Receiving		
Tulsa	Passing		
Tulsa	Rushing		
Tulsa	Receiving		

=== at UTSA ===
Tulsa Golden Hurricane (7–4) at UTSA Roadrunners (9–2) – Game summary

Quarter	1	2	Total
Golden Hurricane			0
Roadrunners			0

at Alamodome • San Antonio, Texas

- Date: November 28
- Game time: TBD

Statistics	TLSA	UTSA
First downs		
Plays–yards		
Rushes–yards		
Passing yards		
Passing: comp–att–int		
Time of possession		

Team	Category	Player	Statistics
Tulsa	Passing		
Tulsa	Rushing		
Tulsa	Receiving		
UTSA	Passing		
UTSA	Rushing		
UTSA	Receiving		

== Personnel ==
=== Roster ===
2026 Tulsa Golden Hurricane football team roster
Players
Coaches
Offense

Pos.	#	Name	Class
WR	0	Donnell Gee Jr.	So
WR	1	David Wells Jr.	RJr
WR	2	Oran Singleton Jr.	RSr
RB	3	Trequan Jones	Sr
RB	4	DJ McKinney	RJr
QB	5	Dexter Williams II	GS
RB	6	Damari Alston	RSr
WR	7	Jimmy Calloway	GS
QB	8	Kyden Barker	Fr
WR	9	Javon Ross	Jr
QB	10	Baylor Hayes	RSo
TE	11	Grant McAtee	Jr
QB	12	Connor Dantzler	Fr
WR	13	Joshua Rushing	Fr
QB	15	Kincayde Eng	Fr
WR	15	Josh Smith	RSo
QB	16	Andrew Alford	RFr
WR	18	Courtney Lewis Jr.	Fr
QB	19	Barrett Mullen	Fr
WR	19	Grayson Tempest	Sr
RB	21	Jamarcea Plater	Fr
RB	22	Kelvin Washington	RFr
RB	23	Seth Davis	RJr
RB	26	Kainon Gibson	Fr
RB	28	Sevion Morrison	GS
TE	32	Max Moore	Fr
OL	50	Malachi Preciado	RSr
OL	51	Javion Antai	RFr
OL	52	Ian Mayes	So
OL	53	Jack Hood	RSo
OL	54	Ross Johnston	Jr
OL	56	Colten Christian	RSo
OL	58	Dawson Matthews	Fr
OL	60	Hunter Erb	RSr
OL	61	Brooks Barron	Fr
OL	63	Chaden Sullivan	Jr
OL	65	Nick Anciaux	Fr
OL	66	Will Morris	RJr
OL	69	Ryley Kester	Fr
OL	70	Alan Pond	Jr
OL	72	JaQuan Adams	GS
OL	73	Cam East	RSr
OL	74	Logan Rich	RFr
OL	75	Evan McClure	RSo
OL	76	Josh Love	RSo
OL	77	Brody Duffel	Jr
OL	78	Davis Dotson	RSr
TE	82	Chris Gacayan II	RJr
TE	84	Jewlyen Roberts	RSo
WR	85	Cole Greene	RJr
TE	86	Luke Tevis	RFr
TE	87	Jackson Shockley	RFr
WR	88	Xavier Green	Fr
TE	89	Kuba Malecki	Fr

Defense

Pos.	#	Name	Class
DL	0	Kyran Duhon	Jr
S	1	Zach Williams	Jr
LB	2	Devin Robinson	RJr
CB	3	JD Drew	RSr
S	4	Tyson Williams	Sr
S	5	Ashton Williams	Jr
LB	6	Chris Thompson Jr.	GS
CB	7	Elijah Green	Jr
CB	8	Micah Tease	RJr
LB	9	Dax Collins	Jr
DL	10	Arias Nash	RSr
DL	11	Jaylen George	Sr
S	12	Dedaunte Scott	RSo
CB	13	NuNu Campbell	RSr
DL	15	Thomas Davis	RSr
CB	16	Caldra Williford	RSr
CB	18	Korbyn Green	RSr
S	19	Rylan Leathers	RSo
S	20	RJ McIntosh	RFr
LB	21	Aquavious Dunbar	RSo
LB	22	Ty Williams	RSr
CB	23	Willie Goodwyn	RSo
LB	24	Devin Hightower	GS
LB	25	Sam Stone	RFr
CB	26	Julian Byrd	Fr
LB	27	Zane Woodham	RSr
S	28	Carter Langenderfer	Fr
CB	29	Keynan Farley	Fr
DL	30	Maruio White Jr.	RSo
DL	32	Hudson Ball	So
LB	33	William Alexander	RJr
LB	34	Elijah Wilson	RJr
LB	35	C.J. Turner III	RJr
LB	37	Rohon Kazadi	RFr
LB	38	Jack Watts	Fr
CB	39	Zach Claton	Fr
DL	40	Tristan Lawyer	RFr
DL	41	Will Upshaw	RSo
LB	42	Reilarean Phillips	Fr
LB	43	Raymir Coney	Fr
DL	44	Kadin Fossung	Fr
S	46	Luke Bussmann	Fr
S	47	Austin Bussmann	Fr
LB	53	Caleb Bowers	RSo
DL	56	Nathan Price	RSo
DL	58	Tyler Rich	RJr
DL	88	Dailen Howard	Sr
DL	90	Jayden Madkins	RSr
DL	91	Carson Dempsey	Fr
DL	99	Tai Newhouse	RSr

Special teams

Pos.	#	Name	Class
K	10	Owen Carey	Fr
K	18	Marlon Hauck	RSr
P	29	Max Tulen	RJr
LS	41	Joel Bazinet	Fr
LS	42	Aidan Fedigan	RSr
P	44	Henry Simon	RSo
K	95	Evan Guenthner	RJr

Head coach

- Tre Lamb
  Head coach

Coordinators/assistant coaches

- Kevin Barbay
  Offensive coordinator
- Ty Darlington
  Co-Offensive Coordinator
  Tight Ends Coach
- Dominique Davenport
  Running Backs Coach
- BJ Johnson
  Wide Receivers Coach
- Joe Scelfo
  Run Game Coordinator
  Offensive Line Coach
- Josh Reardon
  Defensive coordinator
  Safeties Coach
- Hakim Gray
  Defensive Line Coach
- Mike Gray
  Co-Defensive Run Game Coordinator
  Linebackers Coach
- Dominique Franks
  Passing Game Coordinator
  Nickels Coach
- Cam Haney
  Cornerbacks Coach
- Carter Barfield
  Special Teams Coordinator
- Tyler Dell
  Offensive Quality Control
- Kurt Huff
  Offensive Analyst
- Jake Rand
  Defensive Analyst
- Peyton Thompson
  Defensive Analyst
- John Beckley
  Outside Linebackers Coach
- Nick Ast
  Offensive Quality Control
- Ravi Savitala
  Chief of Staff
- Grant Klaver
  Director of Football Operations
- Alex Walter
  Assistant Director of Player Personnel
- Tom Ososkie
  Special Projects
- Chris Scelfo
  Special Assistant to the Head Coach

Legend

- (C) Team captain
- (S) Suspended
- (I) Ineligible
- Injured
- Redshirt

Roster

=== Transfers ===
==== Outgoing ====
Player	Position	Destination
Jaxon Lee	EDGE	Alabama State
Parker Stone	LS	Appalachian State
Mason Fleming	DL	Austin Peay
Issac Covington	S	Butler (KS)
Angus Davies	P	California
Bennett Ringleb	OL	Central Arkansas
Jack Wiltshire	DL	Central Oklahoma
Decari Prater	S	Copiah–Lincoln
Jacob Emmers	WR	Incarnate Word
Buddha Garrett	S	Incarnate Word
Joe Hjelle	DL	Indiana
Josh Anglin	LB	Kennesaw State
Zion Booker	WR	Kennesaw State
Brody Foley	TE	Louisville
Zion Steptoe	WR	Minnesota
Mekhi Miller	WR	Missouri State
Jace Williams	CB	Northwestern State
J'Dan Burnett	EDGE	Rutgers
Michael Slaba	K	SMU
Champ Lewis	CB	Southern Miss
Evan Odom	OT	Stephen F. Austin
Marshall Hefner	DL	Stetson
Ray Coney	LB	Texas A&M
Kirk Francis	QB	Texas Tech
Alex Green	WR	UT Rio Grande Valley
Eli Potts	WR	Wake Forest
Ajay Allen	RB	Western Kentucky
Codie Hornsby	IOL	Unknown
Jeremiah Ballard	WR	Unknown
Dallen Ponder	WR	Unknown

==== Incoming ====
Player	Position	Previous school
Tyson Williams	CB	Abilene Christian
Thomas Davis	EDGE	Appalachian State
Damari Alston	RB	Auburn
Caldra Williford	CB	Baylor
Javon Ross	WR	Bethune–Cookman
Max Tulen	P	Bethune–Cookman
Chaden Sullivan	OL	Butler (KS)
Willie Goodwyn	CB	Cincinnati
Dailen Howard	DL	East Tennessee State
Rylan Leathers	S	Idaho State
Alan Pond	OL	Iowa Central
Dexter Williams II	QB	Kennesaw State
Jayden Madkins	DL	Louisiana Tech
Seth Davis	RB	Mississippi State
Marlon Hauck	K	Mississippi State
Jaylen George	DL	Nebraska
DJ McKinney	RB	New Mexico
Grant McAtee	TE	North Central
Davis Dotson	OL	Oklahoma State
Kyran Duhon	EDGE	Oklahoma State
Trequan Jones	RB	Old Dominion
David Wells Jr.	WR	Oregon State
Malachi Preciado	IOL	South Alabama
Rohon Kazadi	S	TCU
Jimmy Calloway	WR	Tulane
Devin Hightower	LB	UAB
Arias Nash	DL	Virginia Tech
Oran Singleton Jr.	WR	West Virginia
Korbyn Green	CB	Western Kentucky

=== Coaching staff additions ===
Name	New position	Previous team	Previous position	Source
Kevin Barbay	Offensive coordinator	Kentucky	Offensive analyst	
BJ Johnson	Wide receivers	Georgia Southern	Outside receivers	
Cam Haney	Cornerbacks	Indiana	Defensive quality control	
