= 2025 Tulsa Golden Hurricane football team =

American college football season

2025 Tulsa Golden Hurricane football
- Conference: American Conference
- Record: 4–8 (1–7 American)
- Head coach: Tre Lamb (1st season)
- Offensive coordinator: Brad Robbins (1st season)
- Co-offensive coordinator: Ty Darlington (1st season)
- Offensive scheme: Multiple
- Defensive coordinator: Josh Reardon (1st season)
- Co-defensive coordinator: Mike Gray (1st season)
- Base defense: 4–2–5
- Home stadium: Skelly Field at H. A. Chapman Stadium

2025 American Conference football standings
	Conf.			Overall
Team	W		L	W		L
No. 18 Tulane y$^	7	–	1	11	–	3
No. 24 North Texas y	7	–	1	12	–	2
No. 23 Navy	7	–	1	11	–	2
South Florida	6	–	2	9	–	4
East Carolina	6	–	2	9	–	4
Memphis	4	–	4	8	–	5
Army	4	–	4	7	–	6
UTSA	4	–	4	7	–	6
Temple	3	–	5	5	–	7
Florida Atlantic	3	–	5	4	–	8
Rice	2	–	6	5	–	8
UAB	2	–	6	4	–	8
Tulsa	1	–	7	4	–	8
Charlotte	0	–	8	1	–	11
Championship: Tulane 34, North Texas 21
^ – College Football Playoff participant; $ – Conference champion; y – Championship game participant; Rankings from AP Poll

The 2025 Tulsa Golden Hurricane football team represented the University of Tulsa as a member of the American Conference during the 2025 NCAA Division I FBS football season. Led by first-year head coach Tre Lamb, the Golden Hurricane played home games at Skelly Field at H. A. Chapman Stadium in Tulsa, Oklahoma.

== Schedule ==
Date	Time	Opponent	Site	TV	Result	Attendance
August 30	7:00 p.m.	No. 16 (FCS) Abilene Christian*	Skelly Field at H. A. Chapman Stadium; Tulsa, OK	ESPN+	W 35–7	17,337
September 6	8:00 p.m.	at New Mexico State*	Aggie Memorial Stadium; Las Cruces, NM	ESPN+	L 14–21	10,240
September 13	7:00 p.m.	Navy	Skelly Field at H. A. Chapman Stadium; Tulsa, OK	ESPN+	L 23–42	20,103
September 19	6:30 p.m.	at Oklahoma State*	Boone Pickens Stadium; Stillwater, OK (rivalry)	ESPN	W 19–12	48,842
September 27	3:00 p.m.	Tulane	Skelly Field at H. A. Chapman Stadium; Tulsa, OK	ESPNU	L 14–31	16,311
October 4	7:00 p.m.	at Memphis	Simmons Bank Liberty Stadium; Memphis, TN	ESPNU	L 7–45	27,303
October 16	6:30 p.m.	at East Carolina	Dowdy–Ficklen Stadium; Greenville, NC	ESPN	L 27–41	31,307
October 25	2:30 p.m.	Temple^{†}	Skelly Field at H. A. Chapman Stadium; Tulsa, OK	ESPN+	L 37–38 ^{OT}	16,403
November 8	2:00 p.m.	at Florida Atlantic	Flagler Credit Union Stadium; Boca Raton, FL	ESPN+	L 21–40	16,170
November 15	12:00 p.m.	Oregon State*	Skelly Field at H. A. Chapman Stadium; Tulsa, OK	ESPN+	W 31–14	15,034
November 22	11:00 a.m.	at Army	Michie Stadium; West Point, NY	CBSSN	W 26–25	28,705
November 29	2:00 p.m.	UAB	Skelly Field at H. A. Chapman Stadium; Tulsa, OK	ESPN+	L 24–31	13,026
*Non-conference game; ^{†}Homecoming; Rankings from AP Poll and CFP Rankings released prior to game; All times are in Central time

== Game summaries ==
=== No. 16 (FCS) Abilene Christian ===
No. 16 (FCS) Abilene Christian Wildcats (0–0) at Tulsa Golden Hurricane (0–0) – Game summary

Quarter	1	2	3	4	Total
No. 16 (FCS) Wildcats	0	0	0	7	7
Golden Hurricane	7	3	11	14	35

at Skelly Field • Tulsa, Oklahoma

- Date: August 30
- Game time: 7:00 p.m. CDT
- Game weather: Cloudy • Temperature: 78 °F (26 °C) • Wind: E at 5 miles per hour (8.0 km/h)
- Game attendance: 17,337
- Referee: Edwin Lee
- TV announcers (ESPN+): James Westling (play-by-play) and Leger Douzable (analyst)

Game information

First quarter

- (1:34) TLSA – Zion Booker 12-yard pass from Kirk Francis, Seth Morgan kick (Drive: 14 plays, 97 yards, 4:43; Tulsa 7–0)

Second quarter

- (8:47) TLSA – Seth Morgan 28-yard field goal (Drive: 7 plays, 41 yards, 1:26; Tulsa 10–0)

Third quarter

- (11:58) TLSA – Seth Morgan 40-yard field goal (Drive: 11 plays, 53 yards, 3:02; Tulsa 13–0)
- (3:55) TLSA – Dominic Richardson 57-yard run, Kirk Francis pass (Drive: 8 plays, 92 yards, 2:28; Tulsa 21–0)

Fourth quarter

- (13:57) TLSA – Brody Foley 22-yard pass from Kirk Francis, Seth Morgan kick (Drive: 8 plays, 71 yards, 3:18; Tulsa 28–0)
- (11:46) TLSA – Ajay Allen 40-yard run, Seth Morgan kick (Drive: 3 plays, 45 yards, 0:47; Tulsa 35–0)
- (6:42) ACU – Stone Earle 11-yard run, Kyler Meschi kick (Drive: 10 plays, 75 yards, 5:04; Tulsa 35–7)

Statistics	ACU	TLSA
First downs	13	25
Plays–yards	59–260	80–499
Rushes–yards	40–120	46–263
Passing yards	140	236
Passing: comp–att–int	13–19–1	22–34–0
Turnovers	1	0
Time of possession	26:55	33:05

Team	Category	Player	Statistics
Abilene Christian	Passing	Stone Earle	13/19, 140 yards, INT
Abilene Christian	Rushing	Jordon Vaughn	15 carries, 50 yards
Abilene Christian	Receiving	Javon Gipson	3 receptions, 73 yards
Tulsa	Passing	Kirk Francis	20/31, 218 yards, 2 TD
Tulsa	Rushing	Dominic Richardson	20 carries, 142 yards, TD
Tulsa	Receiving	Micah Tease	4 receptions, 69 yards

=== at New Mexico State ===
Tulsa Golden Hurricane (1–0) at New Mexico State Aggies (1–0) – Game summary

Quarter	1	2	3	4	Total
Golden Hurricane	0	0	7	7	14
Aggies	3	0	7	11	21

at Aggie Memorial Stadium • Las Cruces, New Mexico

- Date: September 6
- Game time: 8:00 p.m. CDT
- Game weather: Cloudy • Temperature: 74 °F (23 °C) • Wind: SE at 7 miles per hour (11 km/h)
- Game attendance: 10,240
- Referee: Matt Overton
- TV announcers (ESPN+): Adam Young (play-by-play), Danny Knee (analyst) and Kelly Horyczun (sideline)

Game information

First quarter

- (1:34) NMSU – Ryan Hawk 46-yard field goal (Drive: 4 plays, 13 yards, 2:33; New Mexico State 3–0)

Second quarter

- No scoring plays

Third quarter

- (10:47) TLSA – Baylor Hayes 24-yard run, Seth Morgan kick (Drive: 7 plays, 65 yards, 2:51; Tulsa 7–3)
- (6:17) NMSU – Donovan Faupel 24-yard pass from Logan Fife, Ryan Hawk kick (Drive: 13 plays, 65 yards, 4:30; New Mexico State 10–7)

Fourth quarter

- (11:38) NMSU – Ryan Hawk 38-yard field goal (Drive: 15 plays, 41 yards, 7:49; New Mexico State 13–7)
- (7:33) TLSA – Brody Foley 18-yard pass from Baylor Hayes, Seth Morgan kick (Drive: 8 plays, 75 yards, 4:05; Tulsa 14–13)
- (3:23) NMSU – Gavin Harris 15-yard pass from Logan Fife, PJ Johnson III run (Drive: 11 plays, 75 yards, 4:10; New Mexico State 21–14)

Statistics	TLSA	NMSU
First downs	24	19
Plays–yards	77–375	71–291
Rushes–yards	37–141	26–39
Passing yards	234	252
Passing: comp–att–int	27–40–2	28–45–0
Turnovers	3	1
Time of possession	29:10	30:50

Team	Category	Player	Statistics
Tulsa	Passing	Baylor Hayes	14/17, 134 yards, TD, INT
Tulsa	Rushing	Dominic Richardson	20 carries, 93 yards
Tulsa	Receiving	Zion Booker	9 receptions, 57 yards
New Mexico State	Passing	Logan Fife	28/45, 252 yards, 2 TD
New Mexico State	Rushing	Logan Fife	12 carries, 28 yards
New Mexico State	Receiving	Donovan Faupel	8 receptions, 78 yards, TD

=== Navy ===
Navy Midshipmen (2–0) at Tulsa Golden Hurricane (1–1) – Game summary

Quarter	1	2	3	4	Total
Midshipmen	7	14	14	7	42
Golden Hurricane	14	3	0	6	23

at Skelly Field • Tulsa, Oklahoma

- Date: September 13
- Game time: 7:00 p.m. CDT
- Game weather: Sunny • Temperature: 87 °F (31 °C) • Wind: N at 5 miles per hour (8.0 km/h)
- Game attendance: 20,103
- Referee: Reid Jackson
- TV announcers (ESPN+): Ted Emrich (play-by-play), Barrett Brooks (analyst) and Maria Trivelpiece (sideline)

Game information

First quarter

- (12:07) TLSA – Dominic Richardson 14-yard run, Seth Morgan kick (Drive: 5 plays, 35 yards, 1:33; Tulsa 7–0)
- (2:53) TLSA – Baylor Hayes 6-yard run, Seth Morgan kick (Drive: 3 plays, 46 yards, 1:24; Tulsa 14–0)
- (0:26) NAVY – Alex Tecza 1-yard run, Nathan Kirkwood kick (Drive: 5 plays, 75 yards, 2:27; Tulsa 14–7)

Second quarter

- (5:50) NAVY – Blake Horvath 2-yard run, Nathan Kirkwood kick (Drive: 6 plays, 49 yards, 3:01; Tied 14–14)
- (1:44) TLSA – Seth Morgan 34-yard field goal (Drive: 12 plays, 59 yards, 4:06; Tulsa 17–14)
- (0:10) NAVY – Luke Hutchison 2-yard pass from Blake Horvath, Nathan Kirkwood kick (Drive: 10 plays, 75 yards, 1:34; Navy 21–17)

Third quarter

- (11:09) NAVY – Eli Heidenreich 10-yard run, Nathan Kirkwood kick (Drive: 5 plays, 56 yards, 2:27; Navy 28–17)
- (2:05) NAVY – Alex Tecza 1-yard run, Nathan Kirkwood kick (Drive: 12 plays, 48 yards, 7:20; Navy 35–17)

Fourth quarter

- (9:07) NAVY – Brandon Chatman 1-yard run, Nathan Kirkwood kick (Drive: 10 plays, 51 yards, 6:16; Navy 42–17)
- (6:08) TLSA – Calvin Johnson II 18-yard pass from Baylor Hayes, pass failed (Drive: 10 plays, 76 yards, 2:54; Navy 42–23)

Statistics	NAVY	TLSA
First downs	25	23
Plays–yards	73–461	70–329
Rushes–yards	63–367	33–140
Passing yards	94	189
Passing: comp–att–int	6–10–2	22–37–1
Turnovers	3	2
Time of possession	35:24	24:36

Team	Category	Player	Statistics
Navy	Passing	Blake Horvath	6/10, 94 yards, TD, 2 INT
Navy	Rushing	Blake Horvath	21 carries, 159 yards, TD
Navy	Receiving	Eli Heidenreich	2 receptions, 40 yards
Tulsa	Passing	Baylor Hayes	22/37, 189 yards, TD, INT
Tulsa	Rushing	Dominic Richardson	13 carries, 61 yards, TD
Tulsa	Receiving	Zion Booker	8 receptions, 90 yards

=== at Oklahoma State (rivalry) ===
Tulsa Golden Hurricane (1–2) at Oklahoma State Cowboys (1–1) – Game summary

Quarter	1	2	3	4	Total
Golden Hurricane	10	6	3	0	19
Cowboys	3	0	0	9	12

at Boone Pickens Stadium • Stillwater, Oklahoma

- Date: September 19
- Game time: 6:30 p.m. CDT
- Game weather: Sunny • Temperature: 88 °F (31 °C) • Wind: SE at 8 mph (13 km/h)
- Game attendance: 48,842
- Referee: Kevin Randall
- TV announcers (ESPN): Anish Shroff (play-by-play), Andre Ware (analyst) and Paul Carcaterra (sideline)

Game information

First quarter

- (11:45) OKST – Logan Ward 35-yard field goal (Drive: 9 plays, 57 yards, 3:15; Oklahoma State 3–0)
- (9:36) TLSA – Braylin Presley 19-yard pass from Baylor Hayes, Seth Morgan kick (Drive: 6 plays, 75 yards, 2:09; Tulsa 7–3)
- (2:41) TLSA – Seth Morgan 27-yard field goal (Drive: 15 plays, 60 yards, 5:51; Tulsa 10–3)

Second quarter

- (7:49) TLSA – Seth Morgan 38-yard field goal (Drive: 16 plays, 67 yards, 6:22; Tulsa 13–3)
- (2:32) TLSA – Seth Morgan 47-yard field goal (Drive: 11 plays, 41 yards, 3:44; Tulsa 16–3)

Third quarter

- (11:14) TLSA – Seth Morgan 47-yard field goal (Drive: 10 plays, 46 yards, 3:46; Tulsa 19–3)

Fourth quarter

- (14:14) OKST – Zane Flores 5-yard run, pass failed (Drive: 8 plays, 65 yards, 3:01; Tulsa 19–9)
- (5:49) OKST – Logan Ward 49-yard field goal (Drive: 6 plays, 24 yards, 1:00; Tulsa 19–12)

Statistics	TLSA	OKST
First downs	21	24
Plays–yards	79–424	74–403
Rushes–yards	43–205	33–185
Passing yards	219	218
Passing: comp–att–int	23–26–0	26–42–0
Turnovers	1	0
Time of possession	34:45	25:15

Team	Category	Player	Statistics
Tulsa	Passing	Baylor Hayes	23/36, 219 yards, TD
Tulsa	Rushing	Dominic Richardson	31 carries, 146 yards
Tulsa	Receiving	Brody Foley	4 receptions, 59 yards
Oklahoma State	Passing	Zane Flores	25/40, 214 yards
Oklahoma State	Rushing	Rodney Fields Jr.	17 carries, 113 yards
Oklahoma State	Receiving	Christian Fitzpatrick	4 receptions, 49 yards

=== Tulane ===
Tulane Green Wave (3–1) at Tulsa Golden Hurricane (2–2) – Game summary

Quarter	1	2	3	4	Total
Green Wave	7	17	7	0	31
Golden Hurricane	7	7	0	0	14

at Skelly Field • Tulsa, Oklahoma

- Date: September 27
- Game time: 3:00 p.m. CDT
- Game weather: Sunny • Temperature: 85 °F (29 °C) • Wind: NE at 5 miles per hour (8.0 km/h)
- Game attendance: 16,311
- Referee: Steve Anderson
- TV announcers (ESPNU): Chuckie Kempf (play-by-play) and Darius Walker (analyst)

Game information

First quarter

- (11:28) TULN – Jake Retzlaff 8-yard run, Patrick Durkin kick (Drive: 7 plays, 75 yards, 3:32; Tulane 7–0)
- (9:14) TLSA – Tim Hardiman 1-yard run, Seth Morgan kick (Drive: 7 plays, 75 yards, 2:14; Tied 7–7)

Second quarter

- (12:10) TULN – Javin Gordon 12-yard run, Patrick Durkin kick (Drive: 7 plays, 55 yards, 3:11; Tulane 14–7)
- (6:57) TLSA – Brody Foley 72-yard pass from Baylor Hayes, Seth Morgan kick (Drive: 5 plays, 93 yards, 2:34; Tied 14–14)
- (2:13) TULN – Javin Gordon 25-yard run, Patrick Durkin kick (Drive: 6 plays, 61 yards, 2:36; Tulane 21–14)
- (0:12) TULN – Patrick Durkin 28-yard field goal (Drive: 6 plays, 54 yards, 0:42; Tulane 24–14)

Third quarter

- (5:28) TULN – Javin Gordon 4-yard run, Patrick Durkin kick (Drive: 13 plays, 69 yards, 5:40; Tulane 31–14)

Fourth quarter

- No scoring plays.

Statistics	TULN	TLSA
First downs	23	16
Plays–yards	75–437	74–337
Rushes–yards	43–185	38–92
Passing yards	252	245
Passing: comp–att–int	18–32–0	18–36–1
Turnovers	1	2
Time of possession	34:59	25:01

Team	Category	Player	Statistics
Tulane	Passing	Jake Retzlaff	17/30, 242 yards
Tulane	Rushing	Javin Gordon	15 carries, 78 yards, 3 TD
Tulane	Receiving	Omari Hayes	4 receptions, 89 yards
Tulsa	Passing	Baylor Hayes	18/36, 245 yards, TD, INT
Tulsa	Rushing	Dominic Richardson	14 carries, 48 yards
Tulsa	Receiving	Grayson Tempest	2 receptions, 84 yards

=== at Memphis ===
Tulsa Golden Hurricane (2–3) at Memphis Tigers (5–0) – Game summary

Quarter	1	2	3	4	Total
Golden Hurricane	0	7	0	0	7
Tigers	7	21	10	7	45

at Simmons Bank Liberty Stadium • Memphis, Tennessee

- Date: October 4
- Game time: 7:00 p.m. CDT
- Game weather: Clear • Temperature: 78 °F (26 °C) • Wind: E at 8 miles per hour (13 km/h)
- Game attendance: 27,303
- Referee: Kevin Randall
- TV announcers (ESPNU): Jay Alter (play-by-play) and Rocky Boiman (analyst)

Game information

First quarter

- (8:00) MEM – Matt Adcock 7-yard pass from Brendon Lewis, Gianni Spetic kick (Drive: 11 plays, 64 yards, 5:55; Memphis 7–0)

Second quarter

- (11:14) MEM – Sutton Smith 3-yard run, Gianni Spetic kick (Drive: 6 plays, 80 yards, 3:05; Memphis 14–0)
- (7:46) TLSA – Micah Tease 34-yard pass from Kirk Francis, Seth Morgan kick (Drive: 10 plays, 80 yards, 3:23; Memphis 14–7)
- (2:04) MEM – Cortez Braham Jr. 14-yard pass from Brendon Lewis, Gianni Spetic kick (Drive: 2 plays, 20 yards, 0:25; Memphis 21–7)
- (1:07) MEM – Brendon Lewis 4-yard run, Gianni Spetic kick (Drive: 5 plays, 27 yards, 0:38; Memphis 28–7)

Third quarter

- (9:53) MEM – Gianni Spetic 50-yard field goal (Drive: 11 plays, 52 yards, 5:04; Memphis 31–7)
- (0:53) MEM – Greg Desrosiers Jr. 2-yard pass from Brendon Lewis, Gianni Spetic kick (Drive: 6 plays, 36 yards, 3:14; Memphis 38–7)

Fourth quarter

- (4:50) MEM – Frank Peasant 10-yard run, Gianni Spetic kick (Drive: 4 plays, 38 yards, 1:57; Memphis 45–7)

Statistics	TLSA	MEM
First downs	15	28
Plays–yards	58–246	78–457
Rushes–yards	24–71	48–191
Passing yards	175	266
Passing: comp–att–int	20–34–3	22–30–2
Turnovers	4	2
Time of possession	20:49	39:11

Team	Category	Player	Statistics
Tulsa	Passing	Kirk Francis	20/34, 175 yards, TD, 3 INT
Tulsa	Rushing	Dominic Richardson	14 carries, 48 yards
Tulsa	Receiving	Micah Tease	2 receptions, 57 yards, TD
Memphis	Passing	Brendon Lewis	22/30, 266 yards, 3 TD, 2 INT
Memphis	Rushing	Brendon Lewis	14 carries, 67 yards, TD
Memphis	Receiving	Jamari Hawkins	7 receptions, 110 yards

=== at East Carolina ===
Tulsa Golden Hurricane (2–4) at East Carolina Pirates (3–3) – Game summary

Quarter	1	2	3	4	Total
Golden Hurricane	7	7	3	10	27
Pirates	10	14	7	10	41

at Dowdy–Ficklen Stadium • Greenville, North Carolina

- Date: October 16
- Game time: 6:30 p.m. CDT
- Game weather: Clear • Temperature: 57 °F (14 °C)
- Game attendance: 31,307
- Referee: Steven Anderson
- TV announcers (ESPN): Matt Barrie (play-by-play), Tom Luginbill (analyst) and Harry Lyles Jr. (sideline)

Game information

First quarter

- (10:52) ECU – Nick Mazzie 37-yard field goal (Drive: 11 plays, 33 yards, 2:36; East Carolina 3–0)
- (5:08) ECU – Anthony Smith 66-yard pass from Katin Houser, Nick Mazzie kick (Drive: 2 plays, 76 yards, 0:35; East Carolina 10–0)
- (2:44) TLSA – Brody Foley 38-yard pass from Baylor Hayes, Seth Morgan kick (Drive: 7 plays, 72 yards, 2:20; East Carolina 10–7)

Second quarter

- (14:57) ECU – Marlon Gunn Jr. 1-yard run, Nick Mazzie kick (Drive: 9 plays, 75 yards, 2:47; East Carolina 17–7)
- (11:51) TLSA – Brody Foley 38-yard pass from Baylor Hayes, Seth Morgan kick (Drive: 7 plays, 78 yards, 3:01; East Carolina 17–14)
- (9:33) ECU – Anthony Smith 63-yard pass from Katin Houser, Nick Mazzie kick (Drive: 7 plays, 84 yards, 2:13; East Carolina 24–14)

Third quarter

- (13:09) ECU – London Montgomery 51-yard run, Nick Mazzie kick (Drive: 1 play, 51 yards, 0:09; East Carolina 31–14)
- (7:12) TLSA – Seth Morgan 46-yard field goal (Drive: 10 plays, 25 yards, 3:47; East Carolina 31–17)

Fourth quarter

- (14:47) TLSA – Stephen Kittleman 1-yard run, Seth Morgan kick (Drive: 8 plays, 65 yards, 2:32; East Carolina 31–24)
- (10:51) ECU – Nick Mazzie 32-yard field goal (Drive: 11 plays, 61 yards, 3:56; East Carolina 34–24)
- (5:22) ECU – Katin Houser 2-yard run, Nick Mazzie kick (Drive: 8 plays, 41 yards, 3:13; East Carolina 41–24)
- (1:49) TLSA – Seth Morgan 26-yard field goal (Drive: 11 plays, 33 yards, 2:36; East Carolina 41–27)

Statistics	TLSA	ECU
First downs	21	27
Plays–yards	83–398	91–568
Rushes–yards	42–147	53–268
Passing yards	251	300
Passing: comp–att–int	23–41–0	21–38–0
Turnovers	0	0
Time of possession	30:56	28:36

Team	Category	Player	Statistics
Tulsa	Passing	Baylor Hayes	23/41, 251 yards, 2 TD
Tulsa	Rushing	Dominic Richardson	17 carries, 59 yards
Tulsa	Receiving	Zion Booker	9 receptions, 55 yards, TD
East Carolina	Passing	Katin Houser	21/38, 300 yards, 2 TD
East Carolina	Rushing	London Montgomery	16 carries, 125 yards, TD
East Carolina	Receiving	Anthony Smith	4 receptions, 150 yards, 2 TD

=== Temple ===
Temple Owls (4–3) at Tulsa Golden Hurricane (2–5) – Game summary

Quarter	1	2	3	4	OT	Total
Owls	7	7	14	3	7	38
Golden Hurricane	3	14	7	7	6	37

at Skelly Field • Tulsa, Oklahoma

- Date: October 25
- Game time: 2:30 p.m. CDT
- Game weather: Clear • Temperature: 60 °F (16 °C) • Wind: SE at 8 miles per hour (13 km/h)
- Game attendance: 16,403
- Referee: Edwin Lee
- TV announcers (ESPN+): James Westling (play-by-play), Leger Douzable (analyst) and Maria Trivelpiece (sideline)

Game information

First quarter

- (8:32) TLSA – Seth Morgan 36-yard field goal (Drive: 11 plays, 66 yards, 6:24; Tulsa 3–0)
- (3:02) TEM – Kajiya Hollawayne 24-yard pass from Evan Simon, Carl Hardin kick (Drive: 2 plays, 43 yards, 0:48; Temple 7–3)

Second quarter

- (8:12) TEM – Jay Ducker 1-yard pass from Evan Simon, Carl Hardin kick (Drive: 10 plays, 59 yards, 6:36; Temple 14–3)
- (5:20) TLSA – Brody Foley 5-yard run, Seth Morgan kick (Drive: 8 plays, 75 yards, 2:51; Temple 14–10)
- (0:03) TLSA – Brody Foley 8-yard pass from Baylor Hayes, Seth Morgan kick (Drive: 10 plays, 99 yards, 1:52; Tulsa 17–14)

Third quarter

- (12:28) TEM – Jay Ducker 13-yard pass from Evan Simon, Carl Hardin kick (Drive: 5 plays, 79 yards, 2:25; Temple 21–17)
- (7:28) TLSA – Grayson Tempest 5-yard pass from Baylor Hayes, Seth Morgan kick (Drive: 12 plays, 75 yards, 5:00; Tulsa 24–21)
- (4:13) TEM – Kajiya Hollawayne 6-yard pass from Evan Simon, Carl Hardin kick (Drive: 6 plays, 75 yards, 3:15; Temple 28–24)

Fourth quarter

- (6:05) TEM – Carl Hardin 52-yard field goal (Drive: 6 plays, 13 yards, 2:14; Temple 31–24)
- (3:44) TLSA – Dominic Richardson 1-yard run, Seth Morgan kick (Drive: 7 plays, 75 yards, 2:16; Tied 31–31)

Overtime

- TEM – Kajiya Hollawayne 1-yard pass from Evan Simon, Carl Hardin kick (Drive: 2 plays, 25 yards, 0:00; Temple 38–31)
- TLSA – Brody Foley 9-yard pass from Baylor Hayes (Drive: 5 plays, 25 yards, 0:00; Temple 38–37)

Statistics	TEM	TLSA
First downs	22	25
Plays–yards	69–447	75–436
Rushes–yards	34–180	44–140
Passing yards	267	296
Passing: comp–att–int	24–35–0	19–31–0
Turnovers	0	1
Time of possession	31:48	28:12

Team	Category	Player	Statistics
Temple	Passing	Evan Simon	24/35, 267 yards, 5 TD
Temple	Rushing	Hunter Smith	10 carries, 92 yards
Temple	Receiving	Kajiya Hollawayne	10 receptions, 85 yards, 3 TD
Tulsa	Passing	Baylor Hayes	19/31, 296 yards, 3 TD
Tulsa	Rushing	Dominic Richardson	19 carries, 78 yards, TD
Tulsa	Receiving	Josh Smith	4 receptions, 112 yards

=== at Florida Atlantic ===
Tulsa Golden Hurricane (2–6) at Florida Atlantic Owls (3–5) – Game summary

Quarter	1	2	3	4	Total
Golden Hurricane	0	6	12	3	21
Owls	10	21	3	6	40

at Flagler Credit Union Stadium • Boca Raton, Florida

- Date: November 8
- Game time: 2:00 p.m. CST
- Game weather: Sunny • Temperature: 86 °F (30 °C) • Wind: NE at 6 miles per hour (9.7 km/h)
- Game attendance: 16,170
- Referee: Matt Overton
- TV announcers (ESPN+): AJ Ricketts (play-by-play), Patrick Murray and Maria Trivelpiece (sideline)

Game information

First quarter

- (12:47) FAU – Garrison Smith 35-yard field goal (Drive: 5 plays, 20 yards, 1:11; Florida Atlantic 3–0)
- (6:00) FAU – Jayshon Platt 47-yard pass from Caden Veltkamp, Garrison Smith kick (Drive: 6 plays, 67 yards, 2:06; Florida Atlantic 10–0)

Second quarter

- (9:56) TLSA – Seth Morgan 35-yard field goal (Drive: 10 plays, 80 yards, 4:15; Florida Atlantic 10–3)
- (7:39) TLSA – Seth Morgan 49-yard field goal (Drive: 4 plays, 3 yards, 1:15; Florida Atlantic 10–6)
- (5:21) FAU – Easton Messer 44-yard pass from Caden Veltkamp, Garrison Smith kick (Drive: 6 plays, 75 yards, 2:18; Florida Atlantic 17–6)
- (0:58) FAU – Damarius McGhee 95-yard fumble return, Garrison Smith kick (Florida Atlantic 24–6)
- (0:14) FAU – Easton Messer 11-yard pass from Caden Veltkamp, Garrison Smith kick (Drive: 4 plays, 42 yards, 0:29; Florida Atlantic 31–6)

Third quarter

- (9:38) TLSA – Baylor Hayes 7-yard run, pass failed (Drive: 12 plays, 47 yards, 4:34; Florida Atlantic 31–12)
- (5:34) FAU – Garrison Smith 20-yard field goal (Drive: 11 plays, 72 yards, 4:04; Florida Atlantic 34–12)
- (2:38) TLSA – Ajay Allen 2-yard run, pass failed (Drive: 7 plays, 75 yards, 2:56; Florida Atlantic 34–18)

Fourth quarter

- (13:01) TLSA – Seth Morgan 22-yard field goal (Drive: 7 plays, 29 yards, 2:40; Florida Atlantic 34–21)
- (9:58) FAU – Easton Messer 9-yard pass from Zach Gibson, pass failed (Drive: 6 plays, 75 yards, 3:03; Florida Atlantic 40–21)

Statistics	TLSA	FAU
First downs	27	15
Plays–yards	99–431	57–420
Rushes–yards	53–196	25–109
Passing yards	235	311
Passing: comp–att–int	24–46–2	23–32–0
Turnovers	3	1
Time of possession	36:47	23:13

Team	Category	Player	Statistics
Tulsa	Passing	Baylor Hayes	24/46, 235 yards, 2 INT
Tulsa	Rushing	Ajay Allen	23 carries, 118 yards, TD
Tulsa	Receiving	Ajay Allen	7 receptions, 67 yards
Florida Atlantic	Passing	Caden Veltkamp	21/29, 272 yards, 3 TD
Florida Atlantic	Rushing	Kaden Shields-Dutton	10 carries, 107 yards
Florida Atlantic	Receiving	Jayshon Platt	5 receptions, 114 yards, TD

=== Oregon State ===
Oregon State Beavers (2–8) at Tulsa Golden Hurricane (2–7) – Game summary

Quarter	1	2	3	4	Total
Beavers	0	0	0	14	14
Golden Hurricane	14	3	7	7	31

at Skelly Field • Tulsa, Oklahoma

- Date: November 15
- Game time: 12:00 p.m.
- Game weather: Sunny • Temperature: 80 °F (27 °C)
- Game attendance: 15,034
- Referee: Chris Wiggins
- TV announcers (ESPN+): James Westling (play-by-play), Leger Douzable (analyst) and Madison Hock (sideline)

Game information

First quarter

- (11:36) TLSA – Dominic Richardson 24-yard run, Seth Morgan kick (Drive: 5 plays, 73 yards, 2:11; Tulsa 7–0)
- (8:14) TLSA – Brody Foley 6-yard pass from Baylor Hayes, Seth Morgan kick (Drive: 4 plays, 51 yards, 1:45; Tulsa 14–0)

Second quarter

- (5:33) TLSA – Seth Morgan 25-yard field goal (Drive: 6 plays, 43 yards, 2:37; Tulsa 17–0)

Third quarter

- (12:32) TLSA – Brody Foley 5-yard run, Seth Morgan kick (Drive: 6 plays, 75 yards, 2:28; Tulsa 24–0)

Fourth quarter

- (13:18) TLSA – Ajay Allen 31-yard run, Seth Morgan kick (Drive: 6 plays, 80 yards, 2:58; Tulsa 31–0)
- (8:49) ORST – Trent Walker 3-yard pass from Tristan Ti'a, pass failed (Drive: 8 plays, 75 yards, 4:29; Tulsa 31–6)
- (1:57) ORST – David Wells Jr. 4-yard pass from Tristan Ti'a, Tristan Ti'a pass (Drive: 10 plays, 86 yards, 2:44; Tulsa 31–14)

Statistics	ORST	TLSA
First downs	17	23
Plays–yards	71–310	68–446
Rushes–yards	35–69	49–283
Passing yards	241	163
Passing: comp–att–int	19–36–0	12–19–0
Turnovers	0	0
Time of possession	30:37	29:23

Team	Category	Player	Statistics
Oregon State	Passing	Tristan Ti'a	8/11, 141 yards, 2 TD
Oregon State	Rushing	Anthony Hankerson	19 carries, 46 yards
Oregon State	Receiving	Trent Walker	5 receptions, 117 yards, TD
Tulsa	Passing	Baylor Hayes	12/19, 163 yards, TD
Tulsa	Rushing	Dominic Richardson	27 carries, 166 yards, TD
Tulsa	Receiving	Brody Foley	7 receptions, 95 yards, TD

=== at Army ===
Tulsa Golden Hurricane (3–7) at Army Black Knights (5–4) – Game summary

Quarter	1	2	3	4	Total
Golden Hurricane	7	7	0	12	26
Black Knights	7	15	3	0	25

at Michie Stadium • West Point, New York

- Date: November 22
- Game time: 12:00 PM EST
- Game weather: Cloudy • Temperature: 46 °F (8 °C) • Wind: N at 5 miles per hour (8.0 km/h)
- Game attendance: 28,705
- Referee: Reid Jackson
- TV announcers (CBSSN): Dave Ryan (play-by-play), Adam Breneman (analyst) and Tina Cervasio (sideline)

Game information

First quarter

- (12:23) TLSA – Dominic Richardson 3-yard run, Seth Morgan kick (Drive: 6 plays, 67 yards, 2:37; Tulsa 7–0)
- (11:34) ARMY – Cale Hellums 31-yard run, Dawson Jones kick (Drive: 2 plays, 75 yards, 0:49; Tied 7–7)

Second quarter

- (14:01) TLSA – Ajay Allen 7-yard run, Seth Morgan kick (Drive: 8 plays, 74 yards, 3:55; Tulsa 14–7)
- (5:47) ARMY – Cale Hellums 5-yard run, Cale Hellums pass (Drive: 13 plays, 70 yards, 8:08; Army 15–14)
- (0:24) ARMY – Cale Hellums 5-yard run, Dawson Jones kick (Drive: 9 plays, 55 yards, 3:09; Army 22–14)

Third quarter

- (7:03) ARMY – Dawson Jones 33-yard field goal (Drive: 15 plays, 60 yards, 7:51; Army 25–14)

Fourth quarter

- (4:17) TLSA – Seth Morgan 48-yard field goal (Drive: 11 plays, 30 yards, 4:38; Army 25–17)
- (1:53) TLSA – Josh Smith 8-yard pass from Baylor Hayes, pass failed (Drive: 5 plays, 40 yards, 1:32; Army 25–23)
- (0:12) TLSA – Seth Morgan 27-yard field goal (Drive: 9 plays, 52 yards, 1:24; Tulsa 26–25)

Statistics	TLSA	ARMY
First downs	26	19
Plays–yards	71–497	65–311
Rushes–yards	38–230	55–247
Passing yards	267	64
Passing: comp–att–int	20–33–0	6–10–1
Turnovers	2	1
Time of possession	25:24	34:36

Team	Category	Player	Statistics
Tulsa	Passing	Baylor Hayes	20/31, 267 yards, TD
Tulsa	Rushing	Dominic Richardson	28 carries, 203 yards, TD
Tulsa	Receiving	Zion Steptoe	5 receptions, 76 yards
Army	Passing	Cale Hellums	6/10, 64 yards, INT
Army	Rushing	Cale Hellums	32 carries, 159 yards, 3 TD
Army	Receiving	Noah Short	4 receptions, 47 yards

=== UAB ===
UAB Blazers (3–8) at Tulsa Golden Hurricane (4–7) – Game summary

Quarter	1	2	3	4	Total
Blazers	7	3	7	14	31
Golden Hurricane	3	14	0	7	24

at Skelly Field • Tulsa, Oklahoma

- Date: November 29
- Game time: 2:00 p.m. CST
- Game weather: Cloudy • Temperature: 52 °F (11 °C) • Wind: SW at 14 miles per hour (23 km/h)
- Game attendance: 13,026
- Referee: Steven Anderson
- TV announcers (ESPN+): James Westling (play-by-play), Reggie Walker (analyst) and Smacker Miles (sideline)

Game information

First quarter

- (7:13) UAB – Iverson Hooks 8-yard pass from Jalen Kitna, Jonah Delange kick (Drive: 5 plays, 44 yards, 1:51; UAB 7–0)
- (3:30) TLSA – Seth Morgan 26-yard field goal (Drive: 9 plays, 65 yards, 3:38; UAB 7–3)

Second quarter

- (7:51) TLSA – Jewlyen Roberts 1-yard pass from Baylor Hayes, Seth Morgan kick (Drive: 7 plays, 39 yards, 3:09; Tulsa 10–7)
- (1:42) UAB – Jonah Delange 31-yard field goal (Drive: 14 plays, 62 yards, 6:09; Tied 10–10)
- (0:32) TLSA – Braylin Presley 5-yard run, Seth Morgan kick (Drive: 5 plays, 67 yards, 1:06; Tulsa 17–10)

Third quarter

- (10:24) UAB – Brandon Hawkins Jr. 8-yard pass from Jalen Kitna, Jonah Delange kick (Drive: 10 plays, 74 yards, 4:36; Tied 17–17)

Fourth quarter

- (14:55) TLSA – Ajay Allen 22-yard run, Seth Morgan kick (Drive: 9 plays, 85 yards, 3:31; Tulsa 24–17)
- (10:42) UAB – Jevon Jackson 22-yard run, Jonah Delange kick (Drive: 4 plays, 31 yards, 1:47; Tied 24–24)
- (3:40) UAB – Jevon Jackson 3-yard run, Jonah Delange kick (Drive: 10 plays, 90 yards, 5:13; UAB 31–24)

Statistics	UAB	TLSA
First downs	19	19
Plays–yards	73–395	64–357
Rushes–yards	55–229	42–198
Passing yards	166	159
Passing: comp–att–int	14–18–1	11–22–1
Turnovers	1	2
Time of possession	35:23	24:37

Team	Category	Player	Statistics
UAB	Passing	Jalen Kitna	14/17, 166 yards, 2 TD
UAB	Rushing	Jevon Jackson	23 carries, 117 yards, 2 TD
UAB	Receiving	Kaleb Brown	2 receptions, 61 yards
Tulsa	Passing	Baylor Hayes	11/22, 159 yards, TD, INT
Tulsa	Rushing	Ajay Allen	27 carries, 129 yards, TD
Tulsa	Receiving	Zion Steptoe	3 receptions, 59 yards

== Personnel ==
=== Roster ===
2025 Tulsa Golden Hurricane football team roster
Players
Coaches
Offense

Pos.	#	Name	Class
WR	0	Zion Booker	Jr
RB	1	Braylin Presley	Sr
RB	2	Ajay Allen	RJr
WR	3	Micah Tease	RSo
WR	4	Alex Green	RFr
WR	5	Calvin Johnson II	RSr
WR	6	Jacob Emmers	So
WR	7	Zion Steptoe	RJr
WR	8	Mekhi Miller	Sr
QB	9	Stephen Kittleman	RSr
QB	10	Baylor Hayes	RFr
QB	11	Kirk Francis	RSo
WR	12	Shane Walker	Fr
WR	13	Jeremiah Ballard	RJr
WR	15	Josh Smith	RFr
QB	16	Andrew Alford	Fr
WR	18	Donnell Gee Jr.	Fr
WR	19	Grayson Tempest	Jr
RB	21	Dominic Richardson	RSr
RB	22	Kelvin Washington	Fr
TE	23	Landen Lucas	RSr
RB	24	Dallen Ponder	RFr
RB	28	Sevion Morrison	RSr
OL	50	Ender Aguilar	RSr
OL	51	Javion Antai	Fr
OL	52	Ian Mayes	Fr
OL	53	Jack Hood	RFr
OL	54	Codie Hornsby	RSr
OL	56	Colten Christian	RFr
OL	60	Hunter Erb	RJr
OL	62	Simon Wilson	RSr
OL	65	Sean Hill	RSr
OL	66	Will Morris	RSo
OL	70	Evan Odom	Fr
OL	71	Bennett Ringleb	RSo
OL	72	JaQuan Adams	Sr
OL	73	Cam East	RJr
OL	74	Logan Rich	Fr
OL	75	Evan McClure	RFr
OL	76	Josh Love	RFr
OL	77	Brody Duffel	So
TE	80	Brody Foley	RJr
TE	82	Chris Gacayan II	Jr
TE	84	Jewlyen Roberts	RFr
WR	85	Cole Greene	RSo
TE	86	Luke Tevis	Fr
TE	87	Jackson Shockley	Fr
WR	88	Eli Potts	RJr

Defense

Pos.	#	Name	Class
LB	0	Ray Coney	Jr
CB	1	Champ Lewis	RJr
S	2	Jehlen Cannady	GS
CB	3	JD Drew	RJr
CB	4	Anthony Romphf	RSr
CB	5	Keuan Parker	RSr
LB	6	Chris Thompson Jr.	GS
CB	7	Elijah Green	So
LB	8	Issac Covington	RFr
S	9	Dax Collins	So
DL	10	Tim Hardiman	RSr
DL	11	J'Dan Burnett	RJr
S	12	Dedaunte Scott	So
CB	13	NuNu Campbell	RJr
S	15	Ashton Williams	So
LB	16	Devin Robinson	RSo
S	18	Zach Williams	So
DL	19	Ty Cooper	RSr
S	20	RJ McIntosh	Fr
S	21	Lento Smith Jr.	RSr
S	22	Ty Williams	RJr
CB	23	Jace Williams	Fr
LB	24	Buddha Garrett	So
LB	25	Sam Stone	Fr
LB	26	Josh Anglin	So
LB	27	Zane Woodham	RJr
S	28	Decari Prater	Fr
CB	29	Georderrial Williams	RSr
DL	30	Maruio White Jr.	So
DL	32	Hudson Ball	Fr
LB	33	William Alexander	RJr
LB	34	Elijah Wilson	RSo
LB	35	C.J. Turner III	RSo
LB	38	Stockton Ryan	RJr
LB	40	Aquavious Dunbar	RFr
DL	41	Will Upshaw	RFr
DL	42	Jaxon Lee	So
DL	43	Jack Wiltshire	Fr
DL	44	Mason Fleming	RFr
DL	50	Marshall Hefner	RFr
DL	51	Tristan Lawyer	Fr
DL	52	Joah Cash	RSr
LB	53	Caleb Bowers	RFr
DL	54	Byron Turner Jr.	RSr
DL	56	Nathan Price	RFr
DL	58	Tyler Rich	RSo
DL	88	Nahki Johnson	RSr
DL	90	Joe Hjelle	RJr
DL	99	Tai Newhouse	RJr

Special teams

Pos.	#	Name	Class
K	11	Seth Morgan	GS
K	18	Michael Slaba	RJr
P	29	Angus Davies	Jr
LS	34	Parker Stone	RSr
LS	42	Aidan Fedigan	RJr
P	44	Henry Simon	RFr
K	91	Carson Zilmer	RSr
K	95	Evan Guenthner	RSo

Head coach

- Tre Lamb
  Head coach

Coordinators/assistant coaches

- Brad Robbins
  Offensive coordinator
  Quarterbacks Coach
- Ryan Switzer
  Passing Game Coordinator
  Wide Receivers Coach
- Kam Martin
  Associate Head Coach
  Running Backs Coach
- Ty Darlington
  Co-Offensive Coordinator
  Tight Ends Coach
- Joe Scelfo
  Run Game Coordinator
  Offensive Line Coach
- Josh Reardon
  Defensive coordinator
  Safeties Coach
- Hakim Gray
  Defensive Line Coach
- Mike Gray
  Co-Defensive Run Game Coordinator
  Linebackers Coach
- Dominique Franks
  Passing Game Coordinator
  Cornerbacks Coach
- Carter Barfield
  Special Teams Coordinator
- Dontez Byrd
  Offensive Analyst
- Dominique Davenport
  Special Teams Analyst
- Tyler Dell
  Defensive Analyst
- Kurt Huff
  Offensive Analyst
- Jake Rand
  Defensive Analyst
- Peyton Thompson
  Defensive Analyst
- John Beckley
  Outside Linebackers Coach
- Nick Ast
  Offensive Quality Control
- Ravi Savitala
  Chief of Staff
- Grant Klaver
  Director of Football Operations
- Colton Shirley
  Assistant Director of Player Personnel
- Andrew Lee
  Assistant Director of Player Personnel
- Tom Ososkie
  Special Projects
- Chris Scelfo
  Special Assistant to the Head Coach

Legend

- (C) Team captain
- (S) Suspended
- (I) Ineligible
- Injured
- Redshirt

Roster

=== Transfers ===
==== Outgoing ====
Player	Position	Destination
Jackson Johnson	QB	Baldwin Wallace
Mari Smith	WR/CB	Central Arkansas
Joseph Williams	WR	Colorado
Lloyd Avant	RB	Colorado State
Viron Ellison Jr.	RB	Delaware
Cam Crooks	RB	Emporia State
Tautai Lio Marks	OL	Hawaii
Luke McGary	TE	Houston
Luke Berry	DE	Idaho State
Vontroy Malone	DE	Iowa State
Jack Tanner	OL	Kansas
Zach Neilsen	LB	Lindenwood
Rickey Hunt Jr.	RB	Middle Tennessee
Daniel Ademisoye	OT	Norfolk State
Will Smith	DE	North Texas
Connor Vaughn	TE	North Texas
Seth Bullock	LB	Northern Iowa
Bill Jackson	RB	Northern Iowa
Owen Ostroski	DE	Northern Iowa
Tim Carpenter	QB	Ohio
Banks Bowen	QB	Oklahoma State
Kasen Carpenter	OL	Oklahoma State
Corey Smith	WR	Purdue
Cardell Williams	QB	Sacramento State
Jackson Ford	TE	San Diego State
Sean DaVault	LB	Tarleton State
R.J. Jackson Jr.	DL	UCF
Matthew Ogunrin	WR	UT Rio Grande Valley
Troop O'Neal	K	UT Rio Grande Valley
Walter Young Bear	OL	West Virginia
Dayne Hodge	S	Youngstown State
Tyree Carlisle	DB	Unknown
Ender Aguilar	OL	Withdrawn
Jehlen Cannady	S	Withdrawn
Tai Newhouse	DL	Withdrawn
Bennett Ringleb	OL	Withdrawn
Devin Robinson	S	Withdrawn
Zion Steptoe	WR	Withdrawn
Parker Stone	LS	Withdrawn
Maruio White Jr.	DE	Withdrawn

==== Incoming ====
Player	Position	Previous school
Tim Hardiman	DL	Arkansas State
Anthony Romphf	CB	Charlotte
Joah Cash	EDGE	Coastal Carolina
JaQuan Adams	OL	East Tennessee State
Ray Coney	LB	East Tennessee State
Baylor Hayes	QB	East Tennessee State
Jack Hood	OT	East Tennessee State
Lento Smith	CB	Ferris State
Ajay Allen Jr.	RB	FIU
Byron Turner Jr.	DE	Florida State
Brody Foley	TE	Indiana
Sevion Morrison	RB	Kansas
J'Dan Burnett	DE	Louisiana Tech
Chris Gacayan II	TE	Mary Hardin–Baylor
Simon Wilson	OL	Middle Tennessee
Mekhi Miller	WR	Missouri
Sean Hill	OL	NC State
Dominic Richardson	RB	New Mexico State
Josh Anglin	LB	North Alabama
Calvin Johnson II	WR	Northwestern
Rickey Hunt Jr.	RB	Ohio
Cam East	OT	Ole Miss
Evan McClure	IOL	Oklahoma
Ty Williams	S	Oklahoma State
Nahki Johnson	DL	Pittsburgh
Landen Lucas	TE	Robert Morris
Codie Hornsby	IOL	Syracuse
Micah Tease	WR	Texas A&M
Hunter Erb	OL	Texas A&M
Ty Cooper	LB	Tulane
Aidan Fedigan	LS	UCF
JD Drew	DB	Utah State
Zion Booker	WR	Western Carolina
Dallen Ponder	WR	Western Kentucky

=== Coaching staff additions ===
Name	New position	Previous team	Previous position	Source
Tre Lamb	Head coach	East Tennessee State	Head coach	
Brad Robbins	Offensive coordinator/Quarterbacks	UConn	Quarterbacks	
Ty Darlington	Co-offensive coordinator/Tight ends	Incarnate Word	Offensive line	
Josh Reardon	Defensive coordinator/Safeties	East Tennessee State	Associate head coach/Defensive coordinator	
Mike Gray	Co-defensive coordinator/Linebackers	Jacksonville Jaguars	Assistant secondary/Defensive analyst	
Kam Martin	Associate head coach/Running backs	UCF	Running backs	
Joe Scelfo	Run game coordinator/Offensive line	East Tennessee State	Offensive coordinator/Offensive line	
Hakim Gray	Defensive line	East Tennessee State	Assistant head coach/Defensive line	
Carter Barfield	Special teams	Florida State	Special teams analyst	
John Beckley	Outside linebackers	Wofford	Safeties	
