= Darlington (disambiguation) =

Darlington is a large market town in County Durham, North East England.

Darlington may also refer to:

== People ==
- Darlington (surname)
- Christy Darlington, American musician
- Sidney Darlington, American electrical engineer and inventor
- Darlington Matambanadzo, Zimbabwean cricketer
- Darlington Michaels, South African actor
- Darlington Nagbe, American footballer
- Those who held the position of Earl of Darlington

=== Fictional characters ===
- Lord Darlington, a character in the 1893 play Lady Windermere's Fan by Oscar Wilde
- Lord Darlington, a character in the 1989 novel The Remains of the Day by Kazuo Ishiguro

== Places ==
=== England ===
- Darlington (borough), local government borough that includes the town of Darlington and surrounding area
- Darlington (UK Parliament constituency), a constituency represented in the House of Commons

=== Australia ===
- Darlington, New South Wales, an inner Sydney suburb
- Darlington, Queensland, a locality in the Scenic Rim Region.
- Darlington, South Australia, an Adelaide suburb
- Darlington, Victoria, a small rural township with postcode 3271
- Darlington, Western Australia, a suburb of Perth
- Darlington, a town on Maria Island, Tasmania
- Darlington Probation Station, a former penal colony on Maria Island, Tasmania

=== Canada ===
- Darlington, New Brunswick, a former village, now part of Dalhousie
- Darlington, Ontario
  - Darlington Nuclear Generating Station
  - Port Darlington, Ontario, a rural community in Clarington
- Darlington, Prince Edward Island
- Darlington, a neighbourhood and district in the Côte-des-Neiges–Notre-Dame-de-Grâce borough of Montreal
- Darlington Provincial Park, Ontario

=== United States ===
- Darlington, Florida
- Darlington, Indiana
- Darlington, Louisiana
- Darlington, Maryland
- Darlington, Missouri
- Darlington, New Jersey
- Darlington, Ohio
- Darlington, Pennsylvania
- Darlington, South Carolina
  - Darlington Raceway, a stock car racing track hosted by the South Carolina town
- Darlington, Wisconsin, a city
- Darlington (town), Wisconsin, surrounding the city of Darlington
- Darlington County, South Carolina
- Darlington Falls, a series of small waterfalls in Forestburg Scout Reservation

=== Other places ===
- Darlington Township (disambiguation)

== Sports teams ==
In Darlington, England:

- Darlington F.C., a professional football team
- Darlington R.F.C., a rugby union club
- Darlington Mowden Park R.F.C., a rugby union club

== Other ==
- Darlington (SEPTA station), Chester Heights, Pennsylvania
- Darlington School, a private school in Rome, Georgia
- Darlington transistor, a way of connecting transistors
- USS Darlington (1862), a steamship operating during the American Civil War

== See also ==
- Darling (disambiguation)
- Darlingtonia (disambiguation)
- Electoral district of Darlington (disambiguation)
- Dallington (disambiguation)
