= Baylor Hayes =

American football player

- Hayes with Tulsa in 2026

No. 10 – Tulsa Golden Hurricane
- Position: Quarterback
- Class: Redshirt Sophomore

Personal information
- Listed height: 6 ft 0 in (1.83 m)
- Listed weight: 185 lb (84 kg)

Career information
- High school: Brentwood (Brentwood, Tennessee)
- College: East Tennessee State (2024); Tulsa (2025–present)
- Stats at ESPN

Baylor Hayes is an American college football quarterback for the Tulsa Golden Hurricane. He previously played for the East Tennessee State Buccaneers.

== Early life ==
Hayes attended Sandalwood High School in Jacksonville, Florida, before transferring to Brentwood High School in Brentwood, Tennessee, prior to his senior year after his family moved to Tennessee. As Brentwood's starting quarterback during his senior season, Hayes threw for 2,093 yards and 23 touchdowns. Following his graduation, he committed to play college football at East Tennessee State University.

== College career ==
Hayes appeared in two games in 2024, earning a redshirt. He made his first career start in the season finale against VMI, completing 15 passes for 119 yards and an interception in a 16–9 victory. Following the conclusion of the season, Hayes entered the transfer portal. On April 23, 2025, he announced his transfer to the University of Tulsa to play for the Tulsa Golden Hurricane, following head coach Tre Lamb. Hayes entered the 2025 season as the backup to Kirk Francis. He made his Tulsa debut against New Mexico State following an injury to Francis, throwing for 134 yards and accounting for two touchdowns. In his first start for the Golden Hurricane, Hayes threw for 189 yards, a touchdown, and an interception. Against rival Oklahoma State, he completed 23 passes for 219 yards and one touchdown in Tulsa's 19–12 victory over the Cowboys, the program's first win in Stillwater since 1951. Following Tulsa's bye week in October, Hayes was named the Golden Hurricane's starting quarterback for the remainder of the season. He finished the 2025 season appearing in 10 games, including nine starts, throwing for 2,158 yards, 12 touchdowns, and six interceptions while rushing for 190 yards and three touchdowns.

=== Statistics ===
Season	Team	Games			Passing								Rushing			
Season	Team	GP	GS	Record	Cmp	Att	Pct	Yds	Avg	TD	Int	Rtg	Att	Yds	Avg	TD
2024	East Tennessee State	2	1	1–0	18	30	60.0	181	6.0	0	1	104.0	3	15	5.0	0
2025	Tulsa	10	9	3–6	186	316	58.9	2,158	6.8	12	6	125.0	95	190	2.0	3
2026	Tulsa	6	6	4–2	121	192	63.0	1,343	7.0	10	2	136.9	35	123	2.0	0
Career		18	16	8–8	326	541	60.3	3,682	6.8	22	9	127.5	133	275	2.1	5

== Personal life ==
Hayes' sister, Kai, played soccer for the Baylor Bears.
