= Darlington Township, South Dakota =

Darlington Township may refer to one of the following places in the State of South Dakota:

- Darlington Township, Charles Mix County, South Dakota
- Darlington Township, Clark County, South Dakota

See also

- Darlington Township (disambiguation)
