= Kirk Francis =

Kirk Francis may refer to:

- Kirk Francis (sound engineer) (1947–2026), American sound engineer
- Kirk Francis (American football) (born c. 2005), American football player
