= Dallington =

Dallington may refer to:

- Dallington, East Sussex
- Dallington, Northamptonshire
- Dallington, New Zealand
- Sir Robert Dallington (1561–1637), English courtier and writer

== See also ==
- Darlington (disambiguation)
