= Damari Alston =

American football player (born 2004)

Tulsa Golden Hurricane
- Position: Running back
- Class: Redshirt Senior

Personal information
- Born: February 5, 2004 (age 22)
- Listed height: 5 ft 10 in (1.78 m)
- Listed weight: 205 lb (93 kg)

Career information
- High school: Woodward Academy (College Park, Georgia)
- College: Auburn (2022–2025); Tulsa (2026–present)
- Stats at ESPN

Damari Alston (born February 5, 2004) is an American football running back who plays for the Tulsa Golden Hurricane. He previously played for the Auburn Tigers.

== Early life ==
Alston attended Woodward Academy in College Park, Georgia. He set the school record for rushing yards and rushing touchdowns.

== College career ==
=== Auburn ===
Alston committed to Auburn University in December 2021. He also received offers from the Ohio State Buckeyes and the Alabama Crimson Tide. He played his first game against the Mercer Bears in September.

Alston was seen as a leader for Auburn during 2023 through his vocal presence in the locker room and on Twitter. He dislocated his shoulder in September against the Texas A&M Aggies. He scored two rushing touchdowns in the season, against the UMass Minutemen and the Alabama Crimson Tide in the Iron Bowl. Throughout the 2024 season, Alston played in all 12 games.

Alston was expected to be a starting running back during the 2025 season, alongside Jeremiah Cobb. In his first start of the season, against the Baylor Bears, he rushed for 84 yards in 16 carries, including one touchdown run. He also suffered a minor shoulder injury in that game. On October 13, Hugh Freeze announced that Alston had been dismissed from the team.

=== Tulsa ===
Alston committed to Tulsa in January 2026.

=== Statistics ===
Year	Team	GP	Rushing				Receiving			
Year	Team	GP	Att	Yds	Avg	TD	Rec	Yds	Avg	TD
2022	Auburn	12	14	85	6.1	0	1	13	13.0	0
2023	Auburn	10	64	320	5.0	2	8	48	6.0	0
2024	Auburn	12	52	276	5.3	3	6	53	8.8	0
2025	Auburn	4	32	128	4.0	1	4	29	7.3	0
2026	Tulsa	2	28	118	4.2	2	5	39	7.8	0
Career		40	190	927	4.9	8	24	182	7.6	0
