= Darlingtonia =

Darlingtonia may refer to:

- Darlingtonia, California, in Del Norte County
- Darlingtonia (plant) Torr., a genus in the family Sarraceniaceae with a single (carnivorous) species
- Darlingtonia DC., a synonym of the legume genus Desmanthus Willd.
- Darlingtonia (snake), a genus of snakes in the family Colubridae
