= Darling Township =

Darling Township may refer to:

- Darling Township, Ontario, Canada
- Darling Township, Morrison County, Minnesota, U.S.
- Darling Township, Muskogee County, Oklahoma, U.S.

== See also ==
- Darlington Township (disambiguation)
- Darling (disambiguation)
