= Darlington (surname) =

Darlington is a surname. Notable people with the surname include:

- Abel Darlington (1810–1897), American politician from Pennsylvania
- Adam de Darlington or Derlingtun, 13th century English churchman based in Scotland
- Annie McCarer Darlington (1836–1907), American poet
- Charles Darlington, (1901–1986) U.S. ambassador to Gabon
- Christy Darlington, (born 1972) American musician
- C. D. Darlington, (1903–1981) English biologist
- Edward Darlington (1795–1884), member of the U.S. House of Representatives from Pennsylvania
- Hannah Darlington (born 2002), Australian cricketer
- Hannah M. Darlington (1808–1890), American suffragist, abolitionist, and temperance activist
- Ian Darlington, (born 1977) English cricketer
- Isaac Darlington (1781–1839), member of the U.S. House of Representatives from Pennsylvania
- James Henry Darlington (1856–1930), first Episcopal bishop of Harrisburg, Pennsylvania
- Jay Darlington, (born 1968) English keyboardist
- Jeff Darlington, (born 1981) American sportswriter
- Jennie Darlington (1924–2017), Canadian explorer
- Jermaine Darlington, (born 1974) English association footballer
- Jonathan Darlington, (born 1956) British conductor
- Joseph Darlington (1765–1851), representative in the Legislature of the Northwest Territory (later Ohio)
- Kevin Darlington, (born 1972) Guyana-born American cricketer
- Mike Darlington (born 1989), CEO of Monstercat
- P. Jackson Darlington Jr. (1904–1983), American entomologist and naturalist
- Ralph Darlington, (born 1960s) Professor of Employment Relations at the University of Salford, England
- R. R. Darlington, British historian
- Sidney Darlington, (1906–1997) American electrical engineer
  - Darlington transistor, his invention
- Smedley Darlington (1827–1899), member of the U.S. House of Representatives from Pennsylvania
- Stephen Darlington, (born 1950s) British choral director and conductor
- Tenaya Darlington, (born 1971) American poet
- Ty Darlington (born 1994), American football player
- William Darlington (1782–1863), member of the U.S. House of Representatives from Pennsylvania
