= 2024 East Tennessee State Buccaneers football team =

American college football season

2024 East Tennessee State Buccaneers football
- Conference: Southern Conference
- Record: 7–5 (5–3 SoCon)
- Head coach: Tre Lamb (1st season)
- Offensive coordinator: Joe Scelfo (1st season)
- Defensive coordinator: Josh Reardon (1st season)
- Co-defensive coordinator: Kevin Wolthausen (1st season)
- Home stadium: William B. Greene Jr. Stadium

2024 Southern Conference football standings
| | Conf. | | | Overall |
| Team | W | | L | W | | L |
|---|---|---|---|---|---|---|
| No. 8 Mercer $^ | 7 | – | 1 | 11 | – | 3 |
| Western Carolina | 6 | – | 2 | 7 | – | 5 |
| Chattanooga | 5 | – | 3 | 7 | – | 5 |
| East Tennessee State | 5 | – | 3 | 7 | – | 5 |
| Samford | 3 | – | 4 | 4 | – | 7 |
| The Citadel | 3 | – | 5 | 5 | – | 7 |
| Wofford | 3 | – | 5 | 5 | – | 7 |
| Furman | 2 | – | 5 | 3 | – | 8 |
| VMI | 1 | – | 7 | 1 | – | 11 |
$ – Conference champion; ^ – FCS playoff participant; Rankings from STATS Poll

The 2024 East Tennessee State Buccaneers football team represented East Tennessee State University as a member of the Southern Conference (SoCon) during the 2024 NCAA Division I FCS football season. The Buccaneers were coached by first-year head coach Tre Lamb and played at William B. Greene Jr. Stadium in Johnson City, Tennessee.

== Schedule ==
| Date | Time | Opponent | Rank | Site | TV | Result | Attendance |
|---|---|---|---|---|---|---|---|
| August 31 | 3:30 p.m. | at Appalachian State* | | Kidd Brewer Stadium; Boone, NC | ESPN+ | L 10–38 | 36,232 |
| September 7 | 5:30 p.m. | UVA Wise* | | William B. Greene Jr. Stadium; Johnson City, TN | ESPN+ | W 61–0 | 9,155 |
| September 14 | 5:30 p.m. | No. 2 North Dakota State* | | William B. Greene Jr. Stadium; Johnson City, TN | ESPN+ | L 35–38 | 11,040 |
| September 21 | 6:00 p.m. | at Elon* | | Rhodes Stadium; Elon, NC | FloSports | W 34–14 | 4,521 |
| September 28 | 2:00 p.m. | at The Citadel | | Johnson Hagood Stadium; Charleston, SC | ESPN+ | W 34–17 | 11,363 |
| October 5 | 3:30 p.m. | Chattanooga^{†} | No. 23 | William B. Greene Jr. Stadium; Johnson City, TN | ESPN+ | L 10–17 | 10,534 |
| October 12 | 3:30 p.m. | Samford | | William B. Greene Jr. Stadium; Johnson City, TN | ESPN+ | W 31–28 | 8,013 |
| October 26 | 2:00 p.m. | at Wofford | No. 23 | Gibbs Stadium; Spartanburg, SC | ESPN+ | W 24–7 | 4,548 |
| November 2 | 3:00 p.m. | at No. 12 Mercer | No. 23 | Five Star Stadium; Macon, GA | ESPN+ | L 31–37 | 8,692 |
| November 9 | 12:00 p.m. | No. 22 Western Carolina | | William B. Greene Jr. Stadium; Johnson City, TN | ESPN+ | W 24–21 | 12,109 |
| November 16 | 12:00 p.m. | Furman | No. 21 | William B. Greene Jr. Stadium; Johnson City, TN | ESPN+ | L 21–24 | 8,436 |
| November 23 | 12:00 p.m. | at VMI | | Alumni Memorial Field; Lexington, VA | ESPN+ | W 16–9 | 3,825 |
*Non-conference game; ^{†}Homecoming; Rankings from STATS Poll released prior to the game; All times are in Eastern time

== Game summaries ==
=== at Appalachian State (FBS) ===
Game One – East Tennessee State Buccaneers (0–0) at Appalachian State Mountaineers (FBS) (0–0)

| Quarter | 1 | 2 | 3 | 4 | Total |
|---|---|---|---|---|---|
| Buccaneers | 0 | 7 | 3 | 0 | 10 |
| Mountaineers (FBS) | 10 | 7 | 7 | 14 | 38 |

at Kidd Brewer Stadium, Boone, NC

- Date: August 31, 2024
- Game time: 3:30 p.m. EDT
- Game weather: Cloudy • Temperature: 78 °F (26 °C) • Wind: N 4 mph
- Game attendance: 36,232
- Referee: Tim Barker
- TV announcers (ESPN+): David Jackson, Avery Hall

Game information

First Quarter

- (12:18) APP – Christian Horn 83-yard pass from Joey Aguilar, Michael Hughes kick (Drive: 2 plays, 85 yards, 0:44; Appalachian State 7–0)
- (4:03) APP – Michael Hughes 32-yard field goal (Drive: 11 plays, 42 yards, 4:24; Appalachian State 10–0)

Second Quarter

- (7:38) APP – Joey Aguilar 1-yard run, Michael Hughes kick (Drive: 13 plays, 80 yards, 7:13; Appalachian State 17–0)
- (1:49) ETSU – Devontae Houston 80-yard run, Ewan Johnson kick (Drive: 2 plays, 85 yards, 0:46; Appalachian State 17–7)

Third Quarter

- (5:49) ETSU – Ewan Johnson 25-yard field goal (Drive: 9 plays, 58 yards, 5:05; Appalachian State 17–10)
- (3:14) APP – Eli Wilson 34-yard pass from Joey Aguilar, Michael Hughes kick (Drive: 9 plays, 75 yards, 2:35; Appalachian State 24–10)

Fourth Quarter

- (14:48) APP – Makai Jackson 47-yard run, Michael Hughes kick (Drive: 2 plays, 54 yards, 0:52; Appalachian State 31–10)
- (8:39) APP – Joey Aguilar 1-yard run, Michael Hughes kick (Drive: 7 plays, 68 yards, 3:14; Appalachian State 38–10)

Win Probability

Line

Over/Under

| Statistics | ETSU | APP |
|---|---|---|
| First downs | 15 | 22 |
| Total yards | 305 | 500 |
| Rushing yards | 183 | 174 |
| Passing yards | 122 | 326 |
| Passing: Comp–Att–Int | 11–20–0 | 22–36–0 |
| Time of possession | 30:30 | 28:25 |

| Team | Category | Player | Statistics |
|---|---|---|---|
| East Tennessee State | Passing | Jaylen King | 10/19, 122 yards |
| East Tennessee State | Rushing | Devontae Houston | 15 carries, 126 yards, TD |
| East Tennessee State | Receiving | Cameron Lewis | 3 receptions, 47 yards |
| Appalachian State | Passing | Joey Aguilar | 22/36, 326 yards, 2 TD |
| Appalachian State | Rushing | Makai Jackson | 1 carry, 47 yards, TD |
| Appalachian State | Receiving | Kaedin Robinson | 8 receptions, 103 yards |

=== UVA Wise (DII) ===
Game Two – (DII) UVA Wise Cavaliers (0–0) at East Tennessee State Buccaneers (0–1)

| Quarter | 1 | 2 | 3 | 4 | Total |
|---|---|---|---|---|---|
| Cavaliers (DII) | 0 | 0 | 0 | 0 | 0 |
| Buccaneers | 14 | 20 | 17 | 10 | 61 |

at William B. Greene Jr. Stadium, Johnson City, TN

- Date: September 7, 2024
- Game time: 5:30 p.m. EDT
- Game weather: Sunny • Temperature: 72 °F (22 °C) • Wind: NW 6 mph
- Game attendance: 9,155
- Referee: Jason Graham
- TV announcers (ESPN+): Mike Gallagher, Mark Hutsell

Game information

First Quarter

- (14:25) ETSU - Cameron Lewis 12-yard pass from Jaylen King, Ewan Johnson kick (Drive: 2 plays, 19 yards, 0:29; East Tennessee State 7-0)
- (11:10) ETSU - Ephraim Floyd 9-yard pass from Jaylen King, Ewan Johnson kick (Drive: 5 plays, 57 yards, 1:30; East Tennessee State 14-0)

Second Quarter

- (12:07) ETSU - AJ Johnson 8-yard pass from Jaylen King, Ewan Johnson kick (Drive: 8 plays, 51 yards, 2:40; East Tennessee State 21-0)
- (11:14) ETSU - Nick Hunter 13-yard interception, kick failed (East Tennessee State 27-0)
- (7:57) ETSU - Xavier Gaillardetz 37-yard pass from Jaylen King, Ewan Johnson kick (Drive: 4 plays, 60 yards, 1:20; East Tennessee State 34-0)

Third Quarter

- (12:45) ETSU - Jonathan Burns 33-yard pass from Gino English, Ewan Johnson kick (Drive: 2 plays, 85 yards, 0:37; East Tennessee State 41-0)
- (9:01) ETSU - Trey Foster 1-yard run, Ewan Johnson kick (Drive: 5 plays, 69 yards, 1:44; East Tennessee State 48-0)
- (5:32) ETSU - Ewan Johnson 27-yard field goal (Drive: 8 plays, 53 yards, 2:55; East Tennessee State 51-0)

Fourth Quarter

- (13:21) ETSU - Ewan Johnson 36-yard field goal (Drive: 10 plays, 50 yards, 4:44; East Tennessee State 54-0)
- (9:01) ETSU - Torey Lambert 3-yard run (Drive: 6 plays, 51 yards, 2:30; East Tennessee State 61-0)

| Statistics | UVAW | ETSU |
|---|---|---|
| First downs | 5 | 27 |
| Total yards | 113 | 614 |
| Rushing yards | 29 | 254 |
| Passing yards | 84 | 360 |
| Passing: Comp–Att–Int | 10-27-1 | 26-42-0 |
| Time of possession | 30:10 | 29:50 |

| Team | Category | Player | Statistics |
|---|---|---|---|
| UVA Wise | Passing | Jake Corkren | 8-24, 59 yards, INT |
| UVA Wise | Rushing | Dejauvis Dozier | 11 carries, 19 yards |
| UVA Wise | Receiving | DJ Powell | 3 receptions, 47 yards |
| East Tennessee State | Passing | Jaylen King | 16-27, 186 yards, 4 TDs |
| East Tennessee State | Rushing | Bryson Irby | 7 carries, 71 yards |
| East Tennessee State | Receiving | Jonathan Burns | 3 receptions, 76 yards, TD |

=== No. 2 North Dakota State ===
Game Three – No. 2 North Dakota State Bison (1–1) at East Tennessee State Buccaneers (1–1)

| Quarter | 1 | 2 | 3 | 4 | Total |
|---|---|---|---|---|---|
| No. 2 Bison | 14 | 3 | 6 | 15 | 38 |
| Buccaneers | 7 | 14 | 7 | 7 | 35 |

at William B. Greene Jr. Stadium, Johnson City, TN

- Date: September 14, 2024
- Game time: 5:30 p.m. EDT
- Game weather: Clear • Temperature: 79 °F (26 °C) • Wind: E 10 mph
- Game attendance: 11,040
- Referee: Bruce Austin
- TV announcers (ESPN+): Dom Izzo, Kyle Emanuel, Sam Goetzinger

Game information

First Quarter

- (9:58) NDSU – Bryce Lance 18-yard run, Griffin Crosa kick (Drive: 9 plays, 82 yards, 4:57; North Dakota State 7–0)
- (5:32) ETSU – Bryson Irby 3-yard run, Ewan Johnson kick (Drive: 10 plays, 75 yards, 4:26; Tied 7–7)
- (1:12) NDSU – Joe Stoffel 5-yard pass from Cam Miller, Griffin Crosa kick (Drive: 8 plays, 75 yards, 4:20; North Dakota State 14–7)

Second Quarter

- (13:13) ETSU – Ty Anderson 1-yard run, Ewan Johnson kick (Drive: 6 plays, 75 yards, 2:59; Tied 14–14)
- (10:26) NDSU – Eli Ozick 54-yard field goal (Drive: 5 plays, 16 yards, 2:37; North Dakota State 17–14)
- (8:55) ETSU – Bryson Irby 61-yard run, Ewan Johnson kick (Drive: 5 plays, 75 yards, 1:31; East Tennessee State 21–17)

Third Quarter

- (8:21) ETSU – Bryson Irby 10-yard run, Ewan Johnson kick (Drive: 14 plays, 75 yards, 6:39; East Tennessee State 28–17)
- (1:08) NDSU – Cam Miller 1-yard run, 2-point pass incomplete (Drive: 13 plays, 57 yards, 7:06; East Tennessee State 28–23)

Fourth Quarter

- (8:39) ETSU – Cameron Lewis 19-yard pass from Jaylen King, Ewan Johnson kick (Drive: 4 plays, 63 yards, 2:23; East Tennessee State 35–23)
- (1:59) NDSU – TK Marshall 3-yard run, Griffin Crosa kick (Drive: 6 plays, 51 yards, 0:50; East Tennessee State 35–30)
- (0:50) NDSU – Cam Miller 11-yard run, Bryce Lance pass (Drive: 6 plays, 58 yards, 1:07; North Dakota State 38–35)

Win Probability

Line

- NDSU -27

Over/Under

- O/U 53.5

| Statistics | NDSU | ETSU |
|---|---|---|
| First downs | 28 | 20 |
| Total yards | 481 | 383 |
| Rushing yards | 231 | 270 |
| Passing yards | 250 | 113 |
| Passing: Comp–Att–Int | 21–34–0 | 6–16–1 |
| Time of possession | 36:41 | 23:19 |

| Team | Category | Player | Statistics |
|---|---|---|---|
| North Dakota State | Passing | Cam Miller | 21/33, 250 yards, TD |
| North Dakota State | Rushing | CharMar Brown | 11 carries, 65 yards |
| North Dakota State | Receiving | Mekhi Collins | 4 receptions, 67 yards |
| East Tennessee State | Passing | Jaylen King | 6/15, 113 yards, TD, INT |
| East Tennessee State | Rushing | Bryson Irby | 15 carries, 147 yards, 3 TD |
| East Tennessee State | Receiving | Cameron Lewis | 5 receptions, 73 yards, TD |

=== at Elon ===
Game Four – East Tennessee State Buccaneers (1–2) vs Elon Phoenix (1–2) – Game summary

| Quarter | 1 | 2 | 3 | 4 | Total |
|---|---|---|---|---|---|
| Buccaneers | 17 | 0 | 14 | 3 | 34 |
| Phoenix | 0 | 7 | 7 | 0 | 14 |

at Rhodes Stadium, Elon, NC

- Date: Saturday September 21, 2024
- Game time: 6:00 PM
- Game weather: Cloudy • Temperature: 80 °F (27 °C) • Wind: SW 5 mph
- Game attendance: 4,521
- Referee: Bill McKeever
- TV announcers (FloSports): Taylor Durham, Khirey Walker, Hannah Bradey

Game information

First quarter

- (11:46) ETSU - Bryson Irby 4-yard run, Ewan Johnson kick (Drive: 9 plays, 75 yards, 3:14; East Tennessee State 7-0)
- (10:38) ETSU - Jaylen King 8-yard run, Ewan Johnson kick (Drive: 2 plays, 32 yards, 0:58; East Tennessee State 14-0)
- (5:28) ETSU - Ewan Johnson 30-yard field goal (Drive: 9 plays, 79 yards, 3:29; East Tennessee State 17-0)

Second quarter

- (14:56) ELON - TJ Thomas Jr. 3-yard run, Jack Berkowitz kick (Drive: 11 plays, 70 yards, 5:25; East Tennessee State 17-7)

Third quarter

- (9:53) ETSU - Jaylen King 10-yard run, Ewan Johnson kick (Drive: 8 plays, 69 yards, 3:22; East Tennessee State 24-7)
- (6:40) ETSU - Khamran Laborn 17-yard run, Ewan Johnson kick (Drive: 5 plays, 75 yards, 2:20; East Tennessee State 31-7)
- (3:05) ELON - Chandler Brayboy 15-yard pass from Matthew Downing, Jack Berkowitz kick (Drive: 7 plays, 66 yards, 3:29; East Tennessee State 31-14)

Fourth quarter

- (0:59) ETSU - Ewan Johnson 25-yard field goal (Drive: 11 plays, 37 yards, 6:22; East Tennessee State 34-14)

| Statistics | ETSU | ELON |
|---|---|---|
| First downs | 22 | 16 |
| Total yards | 489 | 271 |
| Rushing yards | 256 | 84 |
| Passing yards | 233 | 187 |
| Passing: Comp–Att–Int | 17-28-0 | 16-27-0 |
| Time of possession | 32:29 | 27:31 |

| Team | Category | Player | Statistics |
|---|---|---|---|
| East Tennessee State | Passing | Jaylen King | 17-28, 233 yards |
| East Tennessee State | Rushing | Bryson Irby | 16 carries, 96 yards, TD |
| East Tennessee State | Receiving | Hakeem Meggett | 2 receptions, 85 yards |
| Elon | Passing | Matthew Downing | 12-20, 129 yards, TD |
| Elon | Rushing | Rushawn Baker | 11 carries, 48 yards |
| Elon | Receiving | Jamarien Dalton | 5 reception, 71 yards |

=== at The Citadel ===
Game Five – East Tennessee State Buccaneers (2–2) vs The Citadel Bulldogs (2–2) – Game summary

| Quarter | 1 | 2 | 3 | 4 | Total |
|---|---|---|---|---|---|
| Buccaneers | 0 | 13 | 0 | 21 | 34 |
| Bulldogs | 3 | 0 | 7 | 7 | 17 |

at Johnson Hagood Stadium • Charleston, SC

- Date: Saturday September 28, 2024
- Game time: 5:00 p.m.
- Game weather: Sunny • Temperature: 60 °F (16 °C) • Wind: W 5 mph
- Game attendance: 11,363
- TV announcers (ESPN+): Dave Weinstein, Vad Lee, Madison Little

Game information

First quarter

- (7:25) CIT - Ben Barnes 32-yard field goal (Drive: 7 plays, 44 yards, 4:02; The Citadel 3-0)

Second quarter

- (13:46) ETSU - Khamran Laborn 20-yard run, kick failed (Drive: 10 plays, 80 yards, 3:47; East Tennessee State 6-3)
- (7:03) ETSU - Jaylen King 14-yard run, Ewan Johnson kick (Drive: 6 plays, 68 yards, 1:16; East Tennessee State 13-3)

Third quarter

- (10:32) CIT - Garrison Johnson 1-yard run, Ben Barnes kick (Drive: 3 plays, 8 yards, 1:16; East Tennessee State 13-10)

Fourth quarter

- (5:42) ETSU - Khamran Laborn 40-yard run, Ewan Johnson kick (Drive: 7 plays, 80 yards, 4:38; East Tennessee State 20-10)
- (5:31) ETSU - Jimmy Bowdry 0-yard interception, Ewan Johnson kick (East Tennessee State 27-10)
- (3:17) CIT - Tyler Cherry 33-yard pass from Johnathan Bennett, Ben Barnes kick (Drive: 10 plays, 71 yards, 2:07; East Tennessee State 27-17)
- (3:05) ETSU - Bryson Irby 58-yard run, Ewan Johnson kick (Drive: 1 play, 58 yards, 0:11; East Tennessee State 34-17)

| Statistics | ETSU | CIT |
|---|---|---|
| First downs | 22 | 12 |
| Total yards | 460 | 269 |
| Rushing yards | 308 | 81 |
| Passing yards | 152 | 188 |
| Passing: Comp–Att–Int | 13-29-3 | 17-32-1 |
| Time of possession | 29:04 | 30:56 |

| Team | Category | Player | Statistics |
|---|---|---|---|
| East Tennessee State | Passing | Jaylen King | 13-29, 152 yards, 3 INT |
| East Tennessee State | Rushing | Bryson Irby | 14 carries, 126 yards, TD |
| East Tennessee State | Receiving | AJ Johnson | 3 receptions, 47 yards |
| The Citadel | Passing | Johnathan Bennett | 16-31, 187 yards, TD, INT |
| The Citadel | Rushing | Corey Ibrahim | 11 carries, 48 yards |
| The Citadel | Receiving | Tyler Cherry | 2 receptions, 75 yards, TD |

=== Chattanooga ===
Game Six – Chattanooga Mocs (1–3) vs No. 23 East Tennessee State Buccaneers (3–2) – Game summary

| Quarter | 1 | 2 | 3 | 4 | Total |
|---|---|---|---|---|---|
| Mocs | 0 | 3 | 7 | 7 | 17 |
| No. 23 Buccaneers | 0 | 0 | 3 | 7 | 10 |

at William B. Greene Jr. Stadium, Johnson City, TN

- Date: Saturday October 5, 2024
- Game time: 3:30 p.m.
- Game weather: Sunny • Temperature: 78 °F (26 °C) • Wind: N 4 mph
- Game attendance: 10,534
- Referee: Bruce Austin
- TV announcers (ESPN+): Keith Brake (play-by-play), Mark Hutsell (analyst)

Game information

First quarter
Second quarter

- (12:05) UTC - Jude Kelley 45-yard field goal (Drive: 6 plays, 31 yards, 1:38; Chattanooga 3-0)

Third quarter

- (7:00) ETSU - Ewan Johnson 24-yard field goal (Drive: 10 plays, 80 yards, 3:39; Tied 3-3)
- (5:01) UTC - Sam Phillips 38-yard pass from Chase Artopoeus, Jude Kelley kick (Drive: 4 plays, 82 yards, 1:53; Chattanooga 10-3)

Fourth quarter

- (6:33) ETSU - AJ Johnson 25-yard pass from Gino English, Ewan Johnson kick (Drive: 8 plays, 55 yards, 3:27; Tied 10-10)
- (0:43) UTC - Reggie Davis 1-yard run, Jude Kelley kick (Drive: 11 plays, 75 yards, 5:50; Chattanooga 17-10)

| Statistics | UTC | ETSU |
|---|---|---|
| First downs | 22 | 12 |
| Total yards | 397 | 225 |
| Rushing yards | 116 | 117 |
| Passing yards | 281 | 108 |
| Passing: Comp–Att–Int | 17-34-1 | 10-23-1 |
| Time of possession | 37:06 | 22:54 |

| Team | Category | Player | Statistics |
|---|---|---|---|
| Chattanooga | Passing | Chase Artopoeus | 17-34, 281 yards, TD, INT |
| Chattanooga | Rushing | Reggie Davis | 24 carries, 103 yards, TD |
| Chattanooga | Receiving | Sam Phillips | 6 receptions, 110 yards, TD |
| East Tennessee State | Passing | Gino English | 3-8, 57 yards, TD, INT |
| East Tennessee State | Rushing | Devontae Houston | 11 carries, 59 yards |
| East Tennessee State | Receiving | AJ Johnson | 4 receptions, 70 yards, RD |

=== Samford ===
Game Seven – Samford Bulldogs (2–2) vs East Tennessee State Buccaneers (3–3) – Game summary

| Quarter | 1 | 2 | 3 | 4 | Total |
|---|---|---|---|---|---|
| Bulldogs | 14 | 7 | 7 | 0 | 28 |
| Buccaneers | 7 | 7 | 7 | 10 | 31 |

at William B. Greene Jr. Stadium, Johnson City, TN

- Date: Saturday October 12, 2024
- Game time: 3:30 p.m.
- Game weather: Sunny • Temperature: 72 °F (22 °C) • Wind: SE 4 mph
- Game attendance: 8,013
- Referee: Michael Farmer
- TV announcers (ESPN+): Keith Brake (play-by-play), Mark Hutsell (analyst)

Game information

First quarter

- (10:11) SAM - Rayf Vinson 89-yard pass from Quincy Crittendon, Taylor Forrest kick (Drive: 3 plays, 95 yards, 0:51; Samford 7-0)
- (3:17) ETSU - Hakeem Meggett 31-yard pass from Jaylen King, Ewan Johnson kick (Drive: 6 plays, 52 yards, 2:22; Tied 7-7)
- (1:32) SAM - E. Jai Mason 41-yard pass from Quincy Crittendon, Taylor Forrest kick (Drive: 5 plays, 70 yards, 1:39; Samford 14-7)

Second quarter

- (12:55) SAM - Wesley Carlock 23-yard pass from Quincy Crittendon, Taylor Forrest kick (Drive: 7 plays, 61 yards, 2:38; Samford 21-7)
- (2:18) ETSU - AJ Johnson 15-yard pass from Jaylen King, Ewan Johnson kick (Drive: 3 plays, 60 yards, 0:43; Samford 21-14)

Third quarter

- (10:35) SAM - E. Jai Mason 7-yard pass from Quincy Crittendon, Taylor Forrest kick (Drive: 3 plays, 32 yards, 0:58; Samford 28-14)
- (6:54) ETSU - AJ Johnson 75-yard pass from Jaylen King, Ewan Johnson kick (Drive: 2 plays, 92 yards, 0:36; Samford 28-21)

Fourth quarter

- (14:13) ETSU - Ewan Johnson 23-yard field goal (Drive: 13 plays, 47 yards, 6:21; Samford 28-24)
- (1:46) ETSU - Gino English 1-yard run (Drive: 5 plays, 33 yards, 2:10; East Tennessee State 31-28)

| Statistics | SAM | ETSU |
|---|---|---|
| First downs | 14 | 21 |
| Total yards | 319 | 455 |
| Rushing yards | 13 | 151 |
| Passing yards | 306 | 304 |
| Passing: Comp–Att–Int | 27-37-0 | 16-29-3 |
| Time of possession | 26:21 | 33:39 |

| Team | Category | Player | Statistics |
|---|---|---|---|
| Samford | Passing | Quincy Crittendon | 27-36, 306 yards, 4 TD |
| Samford | Rushing | Damonta Whiterspoon | 8 carries, 29 yards |
| Samford | Receiving | Rayf Vinson | 2 receptions, 93 yards, TD |
| East Tennessee State | Passing | Jaylen King | 15-27, 268 yards, 3 TD, 3 INT |
| East Tennessee State | Rushing | Jaylen King | 19 carries, 80 yards |
| East Tennessee State | Receiving | AJ Johnson | 7 receptions, 146 yards, 2 TD |

=== at Wofford ===
Game Eight – No. 23 East Tennessee State Buccaneers (4–3) vs Wofford Terriers (3–4) – Game summary

| Quarter | 1 | 2 | 3 | 4 | Total |
|---|---|---|---|---|---|
| No. 23 Buccaneers | 0 | 3 | 14 | 7 | 24 |
| Terriers | 0 | 0 | 7 | 0 | 7 |

at Gibbs Stadium • Spartanburg, SC

- Date: Saturday October 26, 2024
- Game time: 2:00 p.m.
- Game weather: Cloudy • Temperature: 81 °F (27 °C) • Wind: E 2 mph
- Game attendance: 4,548
- Referee: Jason Graham
- TV announcers (ESPN+): Jim Noble (play-by-play), Thom Henson (analyst), and Van Hipp (sideline reporter)

Game information

First quarter
Second quarter

- (1:59) ETSU - Ewan Johnson 28-yard field goal (Drive: 13 plays, 69 yards, 5:55; East Tennessee State 3-0)

Third quarter

- (10:43) ETSU - Elijah Taylor 15-yard fumble recovery, Ewan Johnson kick (East Tennessee State 10-0)
- (7:09) WOF - Jordan Davis 29-yard pass from Bryce Corriston, Devery Cagle kick (Drive: 7 plays, 75 yards, 3:34; East Tennessee State 10-7)
- (3:38) ETSU - Jaylen King 22-yard run, Ewan Johnson kick (Drive: 9 plays, 74 yards, 3:25; East Tennessee State 17-7)

Fourth quarter

- (13:08) ETSU - Jaylen King 31-yard run, Ewan Johnson kick (Drive: 8 plays, 60 yards, 3:34; East Tennessee State 24-7)

| Statistics | ETSU | WOF |
|---|---|---|
| First downs | 22 | 9 |
| Total yards | 407 | 178 |
| Rushing yards | 209 | 75 |
| Passing yards | 198 | 103 |
| Passing: Comp–Att–Int | 18-33-2 | 8-19-0 |
| Time of possession | 34:06 | 25:54 |

| Team | Category | Player | Statistics |
|---|---|---|---|
| East Tennessee State | Passing | Jaylen King | 18-32, 198 yards, 2 INT |
| East Tennessee State | Rushing | Jaylen King | 12 carries, 88 yards, 2 TD |
| East Tennessee State | Receiving | Karim Page | 5 receptions, 88 yards |
| Wofford | Passing | Bryce Corriston | 8-19, 103 yards, TD |
| Wofford | Rushing | Ryan Ingram | 10 carries, 36 yards |
| Wofford | Receiving | Kyle Watkins | 3 receptions, 44 yards |

=== at No. 12 Mercer ===
Game Nine – No. 23 East Tennessee State Buccaneers (5–3) vs No. 12 Mercer Bears (7–1) – Game summary

| Quarter | 1 | 2 | 3 | 4 | Total |
|---|---|---|---|---|---|
| No. 23 Buccaneers | 14 | 0 | 7 | 10 | 31 |
| No. 12 Bears | 3 | 14 | 14 | 6 | 37 |

at Five Star Stadium • Macon, GA

- Date: Saturday November 2, 2024
- Game time: 3:00 p.m.
- Game weather: Sunny • Temperature: 83 °F (28 °C) • Wind: NE 5 mph
- Game attendance: 8,692
- Referee: Brian Holland
- TV announcers (ESPN+): Frank Malloy (play-by-play), Phil Cox (analyst)

Game information

First quarter

- (10:49) MER - Reice Griffith 36-yard field goal (Drive: 4 plays, 7 yards, 1:17; Mercer 3-0)
- (10:34) ETSU - Hakeem Meggett 68-yard pass from Jaylen King, Ewan Johnson kick (Drive: 1 play, 68 yards, 0:09; East Tennessee State 7-3)
- (2:02) ETSU - Gino English 1-yard run, Ewan Johnson kick (Drive: 9 plays, 46 yards, 3:41; East Tennessee State 14-3)

Second quarter

- (13:29) MER - Brayden Manley 0-yard fumble recovery, Reice Griffith kick (East Tennessee State 14-10)
- (12:16) MER - Marques Thomas 25-yard interception, Reice Griffith kick (Mercer 17-14)

Third quarter

- (9:22) MER - Kellin Parsons 34-yard pass from Whitt Newbauer, Reice Griffith kick (Drive: 8 plays, 79 yards, 4:12; Mercer 24-14)
- (4:38) MER - Mic Wasson 20-yard punt return, Reice Griffith kick (Mercer 31-14)
- (2:40) ETSU - AJ Johnson 18-yard pass from Gino English, Ewan Johnson kick (Drive: 5 plays, 62 yards, 1:50; Mercer 31-21)

Fourth quarter

- (12:44) MER - Reice Griffith 36-yard field goal (Drive: 5 plays, 10 yards, 1:34; Mercer 34-21)
- (5:55) ETSU - AJ Johnson 9-yard pass from Gino English, Ewan Johnson kick (Drive: 5 plays, 79 yards, 0:50; Mercer 34-28)
- (1:37) MER - Reice Griffith 31-yard field goal (Drive: 12 plays, 61 yards, 4:18; Mercer 37-28)
- (0:45) ETSU - Ewan Johnson 44-yard field goal (Drive: 4 plays, 49 yards, 0:52; Mercer 37-31)

| Statistics | ETSU | MER |
|---|---|---|
| First downs | 19 | 15 |
| Total yards | 472 | 292 |
| Rushing yards | 13 | 130 |
| Passing yards | 459 | 162 |
| Passing: Comp–Att–Int | 25-44-3 | 18-29-0 |
| Time of possession | 27:01 | 32:59 |

| Team | Category | Player | Statistics |
|---|---|---|---|
| East Tennessee State | Passing | Gino English | 14-19, 267 yards, 2 TD, INT |
| East Tennessee State | Rushing | Bryson Irby | 7 carries, 11 yards |
| East Tennessee State | Receiving | AJ Johnson | 10 receptions, 162 yards, 2 TDs |
| Mercer | Passing | Whitt Newbauer | 11-18, 124 yards, TD |
| Mercer | Rushing | Dwayne McGee | 25 carries, 127 yards |
| Mercer | Receiving | Kelin Parsons | 4 receptions, 60 yards, TD |

=== No. 22 Western Carolina ===
Game Ten – No. 22 Western Carolina Catamounts (5–4) vs East Tennessee State Buccaneers (5–4) – Game summary

| Quarter | 1 | 2 | 3 | 4 | Total |
|---|---|---|---|---|---|
| No. 22 Catamounts | 7 | 0 | 14 | 0 | 21 |
| Buccaneers | 10 | 0 | 7 | 7 | 24 |

at William B. Greene Jr. Stadium, Johnson City, TN

- Date: Saturday November 9, 2024
- Game time: 12:00 p.m.
- Game weather: Sunny • Temperature: 71 °F (22 °C) • Wind: W 7 mph
- Game attendance: 12,109
- Referee: Bruce Austin
- TV announcers (ESPN+): Mike Gallagher (play-by-play), Mark Hutsell (analyst)

Game information

First quarter

- (9:54) ETSU - Ewan Johnson 40-yard field goal (Drive: 12 plays, 53 yards, 5:06; East Tennessee State 3-0)
- (8:51) ETSU - Ephraim Floyd 13-yard pass from Gino English, Ewan Johnson kick (Drive: 2 plays, 21 yards, 0:53; East Tennessee State 10-0)
- (1:15) WCU - Jake Young 11-yard pass from Taron Dickens, Christian Lowery kick (Drive: 5 plays, 72 yards, 1:44; East Tennessee State 10-7)

Second quarter
Third quarter

- (13:30) ETSU - Xavier Gaillardetz 23-yard pass from Gino English, Ewan Johnson kick (Drive: 3 plays, 26 yards, 1:17; East Tennessee State 17-7)
- (5:38) WCU - Taron Dickens 2-yard run, Christina Lowery kick (Drive: 9 plays, 71 yards, 3:19; East Tennessee State 17-14)
- (0:26) WCU - Taron Dickens 8-yard run, Christian Lowery kick (Drive: 9 plays, 55 yards, 3:44; Western Carolina 21-17)

Fourth quarter

- (5:55) ETSU - Devontae Houston 14-yard run, Ewan Johnson kick (Drive: 5 plays, 28 yards, 2:20; East Tennessee State 24-21)

| Statistics | WCU | ETSU |
|---|---|---|
| First downs | 20 | 21 |
| Total yards | 352 | 328 |
| Rushing yards | 119 | 174 |
| Passing yards | 233 | 154 |
| Passing: Comp–Att–Int | 26-36-1 | 11-24-4 |
| Time of possession | 29:30 | 30:30 |

| Team | Category | Player | Statistics |
|---|---|---|---|
| Western Carolina | Passing | Taron Dickens | 24-34, 233 yards, TD, INT |
| Western Carolina | Rushing | Branson Adams | 14 carries, 81 yards |
| Western Carolina | Receiving | Zion Booker | 5 receptions, 85 yards |
| East Tennessee State | Passing | Gino English | 11-23, 154 yards, 2 TD, 3 INT |
| East Tennessee State | Rushing | Bryson Irby | 21 carries, 79 yards |
| East Tennessee State | Receiving | AJ Johnson | 2 receptions, 58 yards |

=== Furman ===
Game Eleven – Furman Paladins (2–7) vs No. 21 East Tennessee State Buccaneers (6–4) – Game summary

| Quarter | 1 | 2 | 3 | 4 | Total |
|---|---|---|---|---|---|
| Paladins | 7 | 7 | 7 | 3 | 24 |
| No. 21 Buccaneers | 7 | 0 | 14 | 0 | 21 |

at William B. Greene Jr. Stadium, Johnson City, TN

- Date: Saturday November 16, 2024
- Game time: 12:00 p.m.
- Game weather: Sunny • Temperature: 55 °F (13 °C) • Wind: SW 3 mph
- Game attendance: 8,436
- Referee: Michael Farmer
- TV announcers (ESPN+): Pete Yanity (play-by-play), Jay Sonnhalter (analyst), and Jay Friedman (sideline reporter)

Game information

First quarter

- (11:18) FUR - Ben Ferguson 13-yard pass from Trey Hedden, Ian WIlliams kick (Drive: 6 plays, 34 yards, 2:21; Furman 7-0)
- (10:31) ETSU - Devontae Houston 64-yard run, Ewan Johnson kick (Drive: 2 plays, 75 yards, 0:47; Tied 7-7)

Second quarter

- (3:00) FUR - Myion Hicks 2-yard run, Ian Williams kick (Drive: 13 plays, 60 yards, 6:45; Furman 14-7)

Third quarter

- (10:52) ETSU - Gino English 1-yard run, Ewan Johnson kick (Drive: 8 plays, 58 yards, 2:28; Tied 14-14)
- (6:13) ETSU - Xavier Gaillardetz 42-yard pass from Gino English, Ewan Johnson kick (Drive: 4 plays, 57 yards, 1:45; East Tennessee State 21-14)
- (1:36) FUR - Trey Hedden 30-yard pass from Trey Hedden, Ian Williams kick (Drive: 9 plays, 91 yards, 4:28; Tied 21-21)

Fourth quarter

- (9:08) FUR - Ian Williams 21-yard field goal (Drive: 4 plays, 8 yards, 2:01; Furman 24-21)

| Statistics | FUR | ETSU |
|---|---|---|
| First downs | 18 | 20 |
| Total yards | 282 | 425 |
| Rushing yards | 72 | 200 |
| Passing yards | 210 | 225 |
| Passing: Comp–Att–Int | 23-28-1 | 16-26-3 |
| Time of possession | 34:39 | 25:21 |

| Team | Category | Player | Statistics |
|---|---|---|---|
| Furman | Passing | Trey Hedden | 23-28, 210 yards, 2 TD, INT |
| Furman | Rushing | Myion Hicks | 21 carries, 65 yards, TD |
| Furman | Receiving | Colton Hinton | 6 receptions, 62 yards, TD |
| East Tennessee State | Passing | Gino English | 10-17, 142 yards, TD, 3 INT |
| East Tennessee State | Rushing | Devontae Houston | 12 carries, 103 yards, TD |
| East Tennessee State | Receiving | AJ Johnson | 6 receptions, 106 yards |

=== at VMI ===
Game Twelve – East Tennessee State Buccaneers (6–5) vs VMI Keydets (1–10) – Game summary

| Quarter | 1 | 2 | 3 | 4 | Total |
|---|---|---|---|---|---|
| Buccaneers | 3 | 10 | 3 | 0 | 16 |
| Keydets | 3 | 0 | 3 | 3 | 9 |

at Alumni Memorial Field • Lexington, VA

- Date: Saturday November 23, 2024
- Game time: 12:00 p.m.
- Game weather: Sunny • Temperature: 51 °F (11 °C) • Wind: W 16 mph
- Game attendance: 3,825
- Referee: Brian Holland
- TV announcers (ESPN+): Wade Branner, Chip Tarkenton, Guerin Austin

Game information

First quarter

- (11:28) VMI - Caden Beck 32-yard field goal (Drive: 9 plays, 57 yards, 3:27; VMI 3-0)
- (6:01) ETSU - Ewan Johnson 22-yard field goal (Drive: 9 plays, 50 yards, 2:10; Tied 3-3)

Second quarter

- (4:39) ETSU - Bryson Irby 1-yard run, Ewan Johnson kick (Drive: 6 plays, 17 yards, 2:26; East Tennessee State 10-3)
- (0:00) ETSU - Ewan Johnson 20-yard field goal (Drive: 8 plays, 54 yards, 0:52; East Tennessee State 13-3)

Third quarter

- (10:20) ETSU - Ewan Johnson 40-yard field goal (Drive: 11 plays, 49 yards, 4:33; East Tennesse State 16-3)
- (4:15) VMI - Caden Beck 48-yard field goal (Drive: 12 plays, 48 yards, 6:05; East Tennessee State 16-6)

Fourth quarter

- (12:08) VMI - Caden Beck 48-yard field goal (Drive: 9 plays, 36 yards, 4:20; East Tennessee State 16-9)

| Statistics | ETSU | VMI |
|---|---|---|
| First downs | 19 | 12 |
| Total yards | 314 | 264 |
| Rushing yards | 195 | 202 |
| Passing yards | 119 | 62 |
| Passing: Comp–Att–Int | 15-25-1 | 12-28-0 |
| Time of possession | 29:21 | 30:39 |

| Team | Category | Player | Statistics |
|---|---|---|---|
| East Tennessee State | Passing | Baylor Hayes | 15-25, 119 yards, INT |
| East Tennessee State | Rushing | Devontae Houston | 18 carries, 104 yards |
| East Tennessee State | Receiving | Karim Page | 4 receptions, 104 yards |
| VMI | Passing | JoJo Crump | 10-28, 62 yards |
| VMI | Rushing | JoJo Crump | 11 carries, 126 yards |
| VMI | Receiving | Morgan McPhaul | 2 receptions, 19 yards |
