= Electoral district of Darlington =

Electoral district of Darlington may refer to:

- Electoral district of Darlington (New South Wales)
- Electoral district of Darlington (Queensland)
- Darlington (UK Parliament constituency)
