= Darlington Township =

Darlington Township may refer to the following places:

== Canada ==
- Darlington Township, Durham County, Ontario (merged into Darlington, Ontario in 1973)

== United States ==
- Darlington Township, Harvey County, Kansas
- Darlington Township, Canadian County, Oklahoma
- Darlington Township, Beaver County, Pennsylvania
- Darlington Township, Charles Mix County, South Dakota
- Darlington Township, Clark County, South Dakota

== See also ==
- Darlington (disambiguation)
- Darling Township (disambiguation)
