= Darlingtonia, California =

Unincorporated community in California, United States

Darlingtonia
- Unincorporated community
- Location in California Darlingtonia (the United States)
- Coordinates: 41°50′10″N 123°56′35″W
- Country: United States
- State: California
- County: Del Norte
- Elevation: 463 ft (141 m)

Darlingtonia is an unincorporated community in Del Norte County, California, United States. It is located on the south bank of the Middle Fork of the Smith River 1.5 miles (2.4 km) east-southeast of Gasquet, at an elevation of 463 feet (141 m). It is named after the Darlingtonia californica, common in the region. Darlingtonia was a vacation site with a motel, which was gone by 1970; the site is now a private residence.
