= Tre Lamb =

American football player and coach (born 1989)

Current position
- Title: Head coach
- Team: Tulsa
- Conference: American
- Record: 11–12

Biographical details
- Born: September 16, 1989 (age 37); Calhoun, Georgia, U.S.

Playing career
- 2008–2012: Tennessee Tech
- Position: Quarterback

Coaching career (HC unless noted)
- 2013: Tennessee Tech (QB)
- 2014–2017: Mercer (QB)
- 2018–2019: Tennessee Tech (OC)
- 2020–2023: Gardner–Webb
- 2024: East Tennessee State
- 2025–present: Tulsa

Head coaching record
- Overall: 38–37
- Tournaments: 1–2 (NCAA D-I playoffs)

Accomplishments and honors

Championships
- Big South (2022); Big South–OVC (2023)

Tre Lamb (born September 16, 1989) is an American college football coach and former player. He is the head football coach at the University of Tulsa, a position he has held since December 2024. Lamb served as the head football coach at East Tennessee State University during the 2024 season and at Gardner–Webb University from 2020 to 2023. He previously worked as an assistant coach at Tennessee Tech University and Mercer University.

== Playing career ==
Lamb attended Tennessee Tech, where he was a three-year starting quarterback. In 2011, he led the Golden Eagles to the program's first Ohio Valley Conference championship victory in 36 years. That same year, he helped the Golden Eagles break nine program records including points scored in a season (355), highest scoring average in a season (32.3 points per game), and most first downs in a season (238). He was the recipient of the Robert Hill Johnson Award. He graduated from Tennessee Tech with a bachelor's degree in interdisciplinary studies.

== Coaching career ==
=== Tennessee Tech ===
In 2013, Lamb was hired as the quarterbacks coach at Tennessee Tech.

=== Mercer ===
In 2014, Lamb was hired as the quarterbacks coach at Mercer. Lamb's focus while at Mercer was on player development. He helped the Bears' quarterbacks set a new program record for passing yards.

=== Tennessee Tech (second stint) ===
In 2018, Lamb was hired as the offensive coordinator at Tennessee Tech. During his stint at Tennessee Tech, he engineered a remarkable turnaround in the program's offense. In 2017 and 2018 combined, the Golden Eagles won just 2 games. During the 2019 season, with Lamb's assistance, the Golden Eagles improved their overall record to 6–6. In 2019, the Golden Eagles accumulated 348 total scoring points which was 58% greater than other scoring offenses in the Ohio Valley Conference.

=== Gardner–Webb ===
On December 14, 2019, Lamb was named the head coach at Gardner–Webb University, replacing Carroll McCray. Going into his first season, his recruiting class was ranked third in the Big South Conference. Included in this class were four three-star recruits.

In his third season, three milestones were reached for the program. For the first time since 2003, the team won the Big South conference title. They clinched an automatic bid to the FCS Playoffs, their first playoff appearance as an FCS team and first as a program since the 1992 NAIA playoffs. Their best season in 19 years would be further added on with a win over Eastern Kentucky in the first round of the playoffs, their first FCS playoff win in program history.

In his fourth season, three more milestones were reached for the program. They finished as Big South–OVC co-champions with UT Martin, but they would get an automatic bid to the FCS Playoffs from a 38–34 win over the Skyhawks on Oct. 28, 2023. This would be the first time they would have back-to-back conference titles and winning seasons since 2002–03. This would also be the first back-to-back postseason appearances in program history.

=== East Tennessee State ===
Tre Lamb was named head coach at East Tennessee State in November 2023.

ETSU had gone 3–8 for two years in a row before Lamb arrived as head coach. He quickly turned them around to a record of 7–5 in his lone season there. One of the losses was to FBS member Appalachian State, and the other four losses were single digit losses by a combined 19 points.

=== Tulsa ===
On December 8, 2024, Lamb was named the head football coach for the Tulsa Golden Hurricane.

== Personal life ==
Tre's father Hal Lamb, was a successful high school football coach, winning three Georgia state titles for Calhoun High; his grandfather Ray also coached to three high school state titles. He is the nephew of longtime college head coach Bobby Lamb, and cousin of former Appalachian State quarterback and current position coach Taylor Lamb.

== Head coaching record ==
Year	Team	Overall	Conference	Standing	Bowl/playoffs
Gardner–Webb Runnin' Bulldogs (Big South Conference) (2020–2022)
2020–21	Gardner–Webb	2–2	0–2	T–4th	
2021	Gardner–Webb	4–7	2–5	T–8th	
2022	Gardner–Webb	7–6	5–0	1st	L NCAA Division I Second Round
Gardner–Webb Runnin' Bulldogs (Big South–OVC Football Association) (2023)
2023	Gardner–Webb	7–5	5–1	T–1st	L NCAA Division I First Round
Gardner–Webb:		20–20	12–8		
East Tennessee State Buccaneers (Southern Conference) (2024)
2024	East Tennessee State	7–5	5–3	T–3rd	
East Tennessee State:		7–5	5–3		
Tulsa Golden Hurricane (American Conference) (2025–present)
2025	Tulsa	4–8	1–7	13th	
2026	Tulsa	7–4	4–3		
Tulsa:		11–12	5–10		
Total:		38–37			
National championship Conference title Conference division title or championship game berth
