= Brody Foley =

American football player (born 2003)

No. 80 – Louisville Cardinals
- Position: Tight end
- Class: Redshirt Senior

Personal information
- Born: August 29, 2003 (age 23)
- Listed height: 6 ft 6 in (1.98 m)
- Listed weight: 260 lb (118 kg)

Career information
- High school: Anderson (Cincinnati, Ohio)
- College: Indiana (2022–2024); Tulsa (2025); Louisville (2026–present)

Awards and highlights
- First-team All-American Conference (2025)
- Stats at ESPN

Brody Foley (born August 29, 2003) is an American football tight end for the Louisville Cardinals. He previously played for the Indiana Hoosiers and for the Tulsa Golden Hurricane.

== Early life ==
Foley attended Anderson High School in Cincinnati, Ohio. He was rated as a three-star recruit, the 28th tight end, the 16th overall player in Ohio, and the 573rd overall player in the class 2022 by 247Sports. He received offers from schools such as Indiana, Minnesota, Rutgers, Arkansas, Auburn, Cincinnati, Colorado State, Duke, Illinois, Kentucky, Liberty, Louisville, Tennessee, Michigan State, Pitt, Purdue, Tulane, West Virginia and Wisconsin. Initially, Foley committed to play college football for the Tennessee Volunteers. However, he flipped his commitment and signed to play for the Indiana Hoosiers.

== College career ==
=== Indiana ===
Foley played 20 games at Indiana from 2022 to 2024 before entering his name into the NCAA transfer portal.

=== Tulsa ===
Foley transferred to play for the Tulsa Golden Hurricane. He entered the 2025 season as the team's starting tight end. In week 8 of the 2025 season, Foley hauled in six passes for 126 yards and a touchdown in a loss to East Carolina. He finished the 2025 season with 37 receptions for 528 yards and seven touchdowns in 11 games played. After the season, Foley once again entered the transfer portal.
