= Kirk Francis (American football) =

American football player

No. 18 – Texas Tech Red Raiders
- Position: Quarterback
- Class: (redshirt) Junior

Personal information
- Born: c. 2005 (age 20–21)
- Listed height: 6 ft 2 in (1.88 m)
- Listed weight: 205 lb (93 kg)

Career information
- High school: Metro Christian Academy (Tulsa, Oklahoma)
- College: Tulsa (2023–2025); Texas Tech (2026–present)
- Stats at ESPN

Kirk Francis (born c. 2005) is an American college football quarterback for the Texas Tech Red Raiders. He previously played for the Tulsa Golden Hurricane.

== Early life ==
Francis attended Metro Christian Academy in Tulsa, Oklahoma, where he threw for 9,959 yards and 115 touchdowns. He committed to play college football for the Tulsa Golden Hurricane as a preferred walk-on.

== College career ==
=== Tulsa ===
In Week 11 of the 2023 season, Francis completed 22 of 34 passes for 345 yards and a touchdown in a loss to Tulane. In Week 12, in his first career start, he threw for 252 yards and three touchdowns with an interception on 17 completions in a loss to North Texas. Francis finished his freshman season completing 68 of 121 pass attempts for 968 yards and six touchdowns to three interceptions. Heading into the 2024 season, Francis was named the Golden Hurricane's starting quarterback. In the 2024 season opener, Francis completed 23 of his 30 pass attempts for 299 yards and four touchdowns, while also adding 17 yards on the ground, in a win over Northwestern State.

=== Texas Tech ===
On January 14, 2026, Francis announced that he would be transferring to Texas Tech.

=== Statistics ===
Year	Team	Games			Passing								Rushing			
Year	Team	GP	GS	Record	Cmp	Att	Pct	Yds	Avg	TD	Int	Rtg	Att	Yds	Avg	TD
2023	Tulsa	4	2	1–1	68	121	56.2	967	8.0	6	3	134.7	14	3	0.2	0
2024	Tulsa	11	7	3–4	149	253	58.9	1,585	6.3	9	6	118.5	34	−18	−0.5	0
2025	Tulsa	3	3	1–2	53	88	60.2	493	5.6	3	4	109.4	9	1	0.1	0
Career		18	12	5–7	270	462	58.4	3,045	6.6	18	13	121.0	57	–14	–0.2	0
