= Ty Darlington =

American football player and coach (born 1994)

Current position
- Title: Tight ends coach / Co-offensive coordinator
- Team: Tulsa
- Conference: The American

Biographical details
- Born: December 3, 1994 (age 31); Apopka, Florida, U.S.

Playing career
- 2012–2015: Oklahoma
- 2016: Tennessee Titans
- Position: Center

Coaching career (HC unless noted)
- 2017–2019: Oklahoma (Offensive analyst)
- 2020–2021: Oklahoma (GA)
- 2022: Florida (Quality control)
- 2023: Incarnate Word (TE)
- 2024: Incarnate Word (OL)
- 2025–present: Tulsa (TE / co-OC)

Administrative career (AD unless noted)
- 2016: Oklahoma (Administrative fellow)

Accomplishments and honors

Awards
- Wuerffel Trophy (2015); Campbell Trophy (2015)

Ty Darlington (born December 3, 1994) is an American football coach and former center who is currently the tight ends coach and co-offensive coordinator at Tulsa. He played college football at Oklahoma, where he was a two-time Academic All-American and won both the Wuerffel Trophy and William V. Campbell Trophy in his senior season.

== Playing career ==
=== College ===
Darlington committed to playing college football at Oklahoma in 2011, a school that he grew up a fan of as his mother was a cheerleader for the Sooners. While at Oklahoma, he took part in a number of activities, where he was a leader of a Fellowship of Christian Athletes group, a vice chairman on the Student-Athletes Advisory Committee at OU, and a team captain for football. He was also a stellar student-athlete, compiling a 3.91 cumulative GPA while at Oklahoma, the only non-A he received being a B in a strength & conditioning course. As a senior, he racked up awards, being named the recipient of the William V. Campbell Trophy, an award that considered the student-athlete equivalent of the Heisman Trophy and the Wuerffel Trophy, an award given to the player who combines community service with athletics and academics. He was also named to the 2015 All-Big 12 Conference first-team.

=== Professional ===
Pre-draft measurables
Height	Weight	Arm length	Hand span	40-yard dash	10-yard split	20-yard split	20-yard shuttle	Three-cone drill	Vertical jump	Broad jump	Bench press
6 ft 2 3/4 in (1.90 m)	294 lb (133 kg)	32 1/4 in (0.82 m)	9 7/8 in (0.25 m)	5.09 s	1.78 s	2.96 s	4.71 s	8.07 s	28.5 in (0.72 m)	8 ft 11 in (2.72 m)	24 reps
All values from Pro Day

Darlington signed a professional contract with the Tennessee Titans after going undrafted in 2016, but did not make the team. He retired from professional football shortly after and joined the athletics department at his alma mater Oklahoma as an administrative fellow and for Sooner Sports TV.

== Coaching career ==
Darlington joined the Oklahoma coaching staff in 2017 as an offensive quality control coach. He was reassigned to a graduate assistant role in 2020.
