= Joe Scelfo =

American football player and coach (b. 1994)

Current position
- Title: Offensive line coach / Run game coordinator
- Team: Tulsa
- Conference: AAC

Biographical details
- Born: February 20, 1994 (age 32); Huntington, West Virginia, U.S.

Playing career
- 2012–2015: South Alabama
- 2016: NC State
- Position: Offensive lineman

Coaching career (HC unless noted)
- 2018: NC State (GA)
- 2019–2020: Southeastern Louisiana (OL)
- 2021–2022: Gardner–Webb (OL/RGC)
- 2023: New Mexico (TE)
- 2024: East Tennessee State (OC/OL)
- 2025–present: Tulsa (OL/RGC)

Accomplishments and honors

Awards
- First-team All-Sun Belt (2015)

Joe Scelfo (born February 20, 1994) is an American football coach who is currently the offensive line coach and run game coordinator at Tulsa. He was previously the offensive coordinator and offensive line coach at East Tennessee State University in 2024, the tight ends coach at the University of New Mexico in 2023, offensive line coach and run game coordinator at Gardner–Webb in 2021 and 2022, Southeastern Louisiana's offensive line coach from 2019 to 2021, and a graduate assistant at North Carolina State in 2018. He is the son of former Tulane head coach Chris Scelfo and nephew of current Southeastern Louisiana head coach Frank Scelfo.

== Early life ==
Scelfo was born in Huntington, West Virginia, on February 20, 1994, and later lived in Bogart, Georgia, where he attended North Oconee High School. He went on to college at South Alabama where he played on the offensive line.

Following his junior year, Scelfo graduate transferred to NC State for his final year. While at NC State, his accolades included being named NC State's most valuable offensive lineman, receiving honors as the ACC's top offensive lineman in the final week of the regular season, and being selected for the East–West Shrine Game.

Completing his final year of eligibility, Scelfo was projected as a late-seventh round pick or undrafted free agent in the 2017 NFL draft. Following the draft, he signed as an undrafted free agent to the Houston Texans.

== Coaching career ==
Scelfo became a graduate assistant at NC State in 2018. He then served as the offensive line coach at Southeastern Louisiana from 2019 to 2021. Scelfo then spent the 2021 and 2022 seasons at Gardner–Webb as offensive line coach and run game coordinator.

Following the 2022 season, it was expected Scelfo would join New Mexico as an offensive line coach. On January 13, 2023, Scelfo was named tight ends coach of the Lobos. As a recruiter at New Mexico, he signed FBS's first Swiss-born player.

In 2024, Scelfo joined East Tennessee State as their offensive coordinator and offensive line coach.

Entering 2025, Scelfo joined Tulsa as their offensive line coach and run game coordinator.
