= 2024 The Citadel Bulldogs football team =

American college football season

2024 The Citadel Bulldogs football
- Conference: Southern Conference
- Record: 5–7 (3–5 SoCon)
- Head coach: Maurice Drayton (2nd season)
- Offensive coordinator: Patrick Covington (2nd season)
- Offensive scheme: Spread option
- Defensive coordinator: Raleigh Jackson (2nd season)
- Base defense: 4–3
- Home stadium: Johnson Hagood Stadium

2024 Southern Conference football standings
| | Conf. | | | Overall |
| Team | W | | L | W | | L |
|---|---|---|---|---|---|---|
| No. 8 Mercer $^ | 7 | – | 1 | 11 | – | 3 |
| Western Carolina | 6 | – | 2 | 7 | – | 5 |
| Chattanooga | 5 | – | 3 | 7 | – | 5 |
| East Tennessee State | 5 | – | 3 | 7 | – | 5 |
| Samford | 3 | – | 4 | 4 | – | 7 |
| The Citadel | 3 | – | 5 | 5 | – | 7 |
| Wofford | 3 | – | 5 | 5 | – | 7 |
| Furman | 2 | – | 5 | 3 | – | 8 |
| VMI | 1 | – | 7 | 1 | – | 11 |
$ – Conference champion; ^ – FCS playoff participant; Rankings from STATS Poll

The 2024 The Citadel Bulldogs football team represented The Citadel as a member of the Southern Conference (SoCon) during the 2024 NCAA Division I FCS football season. The Bulldogs were coached by second-year head coach Maurice Drayton and played at Johnson Hagood Stadium in Charleston, South Carolina.

== Schedule ==
| Date | Time | Opponent | Site | TV | Result | Attendance |
|---|---|---|---|---|---|---|
| August 31 | 6:00 p.m. | at Charleston Southern* | Buccaneer Field; North Charleston, SC | ESPN+ | W 22–21 | 5,831 |
| September 7 | 12:00 p.m. | South Carolina State* | Johnson Hagood Stadium; Charleston, SC | ESPN+ | L 20–23 | 10,579 |
| September 14 | 12:00 p.m. | North Greenville* | Johnson Hagood Stadium; Charleston, SC | ESPN+ | W 54–0 | 8,867 |
| September 21 | 6:00 p.m. | at No. 14 Mercer | Five Star Stadium; Macon, GA | ESPN+ | L 21–38 | 10,489 |
| September 28 | 2:00 p.m. | East Tennessee State | Johnson Hagood Stadium; Charleston, SC | ESPN+ | L 17–34 | 11,363 |
| October 5 | 2:00 p.m. | Furman | Johnson Hagood Stadium; Charleston, SC (rivalry) | ESPN+ | L 16–17 | 9,053 |
| October 12 | 2:30 p.m. | at Western Carolina | Bob Waters Field at E. J. Whitmire Stadium; Cullowhee, NC | ESPN+ | L 16–30 | 6,278 |
| October 19 | 1:30 p.m. | at VMI | Alumni Memorial Field; Lexington, VA (Military Classic of the South) | ESPN+ | W 13–10 | 8,277 |
| October 26 | 2:00 p.m. | Samford | Johnson Hagood Stadium; Charleston, SC | ESPN+ | W 28–11 | 8,977 |
| November 9 | 2:00 p.m. | No. 23 Chattanooga^{†} | Johnson Hagood Stadium; Charleston, SC | ESPN+ | L 7–31 | 12,513 |
| November 16 | 1:30 p.m. | at Wofford | Gibbs Stadium; Spartanburg, SC (rivalry) | ESPN+ | W 30–17 | 4,561 |
| November 23 | 3:30 p.m. | at No. 17 (FBS) Clemson* | Memorial Stadium; Clemson, SC | The CW | L 14–51 | 80,300 |
*Non-conference game; ^{†}Homecoming; Rankings from STATS Poll released prior to the game; All times are in Eastern time

== Game summaries ==
=== at Charleston Southern ===
Game One – The Citadel Bulldogs (0–0) vs Charleston Southern Buccaneers (0–0) – Game summary

| Quarter | 1 | 2 | 3 | 4 | Total |
|---|---|---|---|---|---|
| Bulldogs | 0 | 3 | 12 | 7 | 22 |
| Buccaneers | 7 | 7 | 7 | 0 | 21 |

at Buccaneer Field • North Charleston, SC

- Date: Saturday August 31, 2024
- Game time: 6:00 p.m.
- Game weather: Sunny • Temperature: 87 °F (31 °C) • Wind: N at 9 miles per hour (14 km/h)
- Game attendance: 5,831
- Referee: Branden McCain
- TV announcers (ESPN+): Justin Biegel (play-by-play) and Jack DeLongchamps (analyst)

Game information

First quarter

- (7:03) CSOU – Autavius Ison 3-yard run, Patrick Fisher-Butler kick (Drive: 11 plays, 82 yards, 5:11; Charleston Southern 7–0)

Second quarter

- (2:24) CSOU – Jamil Bishop 64-yard pass from Rob McCoy, Patrick Fisher-Butler kick (Drive: 3 plays, 79 yards, 1:35; Charleston Southern 14–0)
- (1:00) CIT – Ben Barnes 49-yard field goal (Drive: 7 plays, 42 yards, 1:21; Charleston Southern 14–7)

Third quarter

- (10:29) CSOU – Tyson Greenwade 2-yard run, Patrick Fisher-Butler kick (Drive: 7 plays, 73 yards, 4:25; Charleston Southern 21–3)
- (6:20) CIT – Johnathan Bennett 1-yard run (Drive: 9 plays, 70 yards, 4:03; Charleston Southern 21–9)
- (0:00) CIT – Johnny Crawford III 1-yard run (Drive: 8 plays, 72 yards, 3:31; Charleston Southern 21–15)

Fourth quarter

- (1:55) CIT – Garrison Johnson 1-yard run, Ben Barnes kick (Drive: 6 plays, 13 yards, 2:52; The Citadel 22–21)

| Statistics | CIT | CHSO |
|---|---|---|
| First downs | 20 | 19 |
| Total yards | 360 | 383 |
| Rushing yards | 190 | 93 |
| Passing yards | 170 | 290 |
| Passing: Comp–Att–Int | 10–17–0 | 20–25–0 |
| Time of possession | 32:11 | 27:49 |

| Team | Category | Player | Statistics |
|---|---|---|---|
| The Citadel | Passing | Johnathan Bennett | 10/17, 170 yards |
| The Citadel | Rushing | Corey Ibrahim | 16 carries, 68 yards |
| The Citadel | Receiving | Dervon Pesnell | 3 receptions, 86 yards |
| Charleston Southern | Passing | Rob McCoy | 20/25, 290 yards, TD |
| Charleston Southern | Rushing | Rob McCoy | 12 carries, 40 yards |
| Charleston Southern | Receiving | Chris Rhone | 5 receptions, 90 yards |

=== South Carolina State ===
Game Two – South Carolina State Bulldogs (0–1) vs The Citadel Bulldogs (1–0) – Game summary

| Quarter | 1 | 2 | 3 | 4 | Total |
|---|---|---|---|---|---|
| South Carolina State | 3 | 6 | 7 | 7 | 23 |
| The Citadel | 3 | 0 | 10 | 7 | 20 |

at Johnson Hagood Stadium • Charleston, SC

- Date: Saturday September 7, 2024
- Game time: 12:00 p.m.
- Game weather: Cloudy
- Game attendance: 10,579
- Referee: Jake Grombach
- TV announcers (ESPN+): Dave Weinstein (play-by-play), Vad Lee (analyst) and Ainsley Clifford (sideline)

Game information

First quarter

- (7:49) SCST – Kyle Gallegos 30-yard field goal (Drive: 14 plays, 62 yards, 7:11; South Carolina State 3–0)
- (3:34) CIT – Ben Barnes 47-yard field goal (Drive: 7 plays, 16 yards, 4:05; Tied 3–3)

Second quarter

- (0:21) SCST – Caden High 10-yard pass from Eric Phoenix (Drive: 12 plays, 87 yards, 4:20; South Carolina State 9–3)

Third quarter

- (11:33) CIT – Ben Barnes 38-yard field goal (Drive: 6 plays, 56 yards, 3:27; South Carolina State 9–6)
- (5:30) SCST – Josh Shaw 1-yard run, Kyle Gallegos kick (Drive: 13 plays, 87 yards, 6:03; South Carolina State 16–6)
- (2:08) CIT – Saul Diaz 10-yard pass from Johnathan Bennett, Ben Barnes kick (Drive: 8 plays, 75 yards, 3:22; South Carolina State 16–13)

Fourth quarter

- (13:23) SCST – Josh Shaw 1-yard run, Kyle Gallegos kick (Drive: 8 plays, 63 yards, 3:35; South Carolina State 23–13)
- (11:30) CIT – Johnathan Bennett 1-yard run, Ben Barnes kick (Drive: 3 plays, 57 yards, 1:44; South Carolina State 23–20)

| Statistics | SCST | CIT |
|---|---|---|
| First downs | 26 | 10 |
| Total yards | 421 | 275 |
| Rushing yards | 217 | 106 |
| Passing yards | 204 | 169 |
| Passing: Comp–Att–Int | 19–26–0 | 13–22–1 |
| Time of possession | 36:13 | 23:47 |

| Team | Category | Player | Statistics |
|---|---|---|---|
| South Carolina State | Passing | Eric Phoenix | 18/23, 194 yards, TD |
| South Carolina State | Rushing | Deondra Duehart | 18 carries, 128 yards |
| South Carolina State | Receiving | Justin Smith-Brown | 5 receptions, 94 yards |
| The Citadel | Passing | Johnathan Bennett | 13/22, 169 yards, TD, INT |
| The Citadel | Rushing | Corey Ibrahim | 7 carries, 52 yards |
| The Citadel | Receiving | Dervon Pesnell | 2 receptions, 72 yards |

=== North Greenville (DII) ===
Game Three – North Greenville Trailblazers (DII) (0–1) vs The Citadel Bulldogs (1–1) – Game summary

| Quarter | 1 | 2 | 3 | 4 | Total |
|---|---|---|---|---|---|
| Trailblazers (DII) | 0 | 0 | 0 | 0 | 0 |
| Bulldogs | 7 | 20 | 14 | 13 | 54 |

at Johnson Hagood Stadium • Charleston, SC

- Date: Saturday September 14, 2024
- Game time: 12:00 p.m.
- Game weather: Sunny
- Game attendance: 8,867
- Referee: Jason Graham
- TV announcers (ESPN+): Pete Yanity (play-by-play), Jay Sonnhalter (analyst) and Dave Friedman (sideline)

Game information

First quarter

- (8:35) CIT – Cooper Wallace 6-yard run, Ben Barnes kick (Drive: 9 plays, 67 yards, 4:08; The Citadel 7–0)

Second quarter

- (10:32) CIT – Ben Barnes 36-yard field goal (Drive: 4 plays, 7 yards, 1:48; The Citadel 10–0)
- (6:24) CIT – Ben Barnes 25-yard field goal (Drive: 7 plays, 35 yards, 2:49; The Citadel 13–0)
- (1:56) CIT – Javonte Graves-Billips 15-yard pass from Johnathan Bennett, Ben Barnes kick (Drive: 7 plays, 68 yards, 2:31; The Citadel 20–0)
- (0:18) CIT – Garrison Johnson 1-yard run, Ben Barnes kick (Drive: 8 plays, 39 yards, 1:10; The Citadel 27–0)

Third quarter

- (11:27) CIT – Whit Hobgood 0-yard punt return, Ben Barnes kick (The Citadel 34–0)
- (2:55) CIT – Corey Ibrahim 28-yard run, Ben Barnes kick (Drive: 2 plays, 35 yards, 0:39; The Citadel 41–0)

Fourth quarter

- (14:12) CIT – Dustin Fletcher 2-yard run, Ben Barnes kick (Drive: 6 plays, 39 yards, 3:00; The Citadel 48–0)
- (3:18) CIT – Dutin Fletcher 1-yard run (Drive: 2 plays, 1 yard, 0:32; The Citadel 54–0)

| Statistics | NG | CIT |
|---|---|---|
| First downs | 13 | 21 |
| Total yards | 225 | 346 |
| Rushing yards | 129 | 222 |
| Passing yards | 96 | 124 |
| Passing: Comp–Att–Int | 12–21–0 | 12–22–0 |
| Time of possession | 31:27 | 28:33 |

| Team | Category | Player | Statistics |
|---|---|---|---|
| North Greenville | Passing | Dylan Ramirez | 7/16, 73 yards |
| North Greenville | Rushing | Jacob Walker | 13 carries, 58 yards |
| North Greenville | Receiving | Cameron Walker | 1 reception, 24 yards |
| The Citadel | Passing | Johnathan Bennett | 9/18, 91 yards, TD |
| The Citadel | Rushing | Corey Ibrahim | 15 carries, 114 yards, TD |
| The Citadel | Receiving | Andre Banks | 3 receptions, 42 yards |

=== at No. 14 Mercer ===
Game Four – The Citadel Bulldogs (2–1) vs No. 14 Mercer Bears (3–0) – Game summary

| Quarter | 1 | 2 | 3 | 4 | Total |
|---|---|---|---|---|---|
| Bulldogs | 0 | 14 | 7 | 0 | 21 |
| No. 14 Bears | 14 | 14 | 7 | 3 | 38 |

at Five Star Stadium • Macon, GA

- Date: Saturday September 21, 2024
- Game time: 6:00 p.m.
- TV announcers (ESPN+): TBD

Game information

First quarter
Second quarter
Third quarter
Fourth quarter

| Statistics | CIT | MER |
|---|---|---|
| First downs | 16 | 20 |
| Total yards | 393 | 433 |
| Rushing yards | 57 | 180 |
| Passing yards | 336 | 253 |
| Passing: Comp–Att–Int | 19-41-1 | 20-25-1 |
| Time of possession | 26:26 | 33:34 |

| Team | Category | Player | Statistics |
|---|---|---|---|
| The Citadel | Passing | Johnathan Bennett | 19/40, 336 yards, TD, INT |
| The Citadel | Rushing | Cooper Wallace | 9 carries, 29 yards |
| The Citadel | Receiving | Javonte Graves-Billips | 4 receptions, 105 yards |
| Mercer | Passing | D.J. Smith | 20/25, 253 yards, 2 TD, INT |
| Mercer | Rushing | Dwayne Mcgee | 17 carries, 94 yards |
| Mercer | Receiving | Kelin Parsons | 5 receptions, 75 yards |

=== East Tennessee State ===
Game Five – East Tennessee State Buccaneers (2–2) vs The Citadel Bulldogs (2–2) – Game summary

| Quarter | 1 | 2 | 3 | 4 | Total |
|---|---|---|---|---|---|
| Buccaneers | 0 | 13 | 0 | 21 | 34 |
| Bulldogs | 3 | 0 | 7 | 7 | 17 |

at Johnson Hagood Stadium • Charleston, SC

- Date: Saturday September 28, 2024
- Game time: 2:00 p.m.
- Game weather: Sunny • Temperature: 60 °F (16 °C) • Wind: W 5 mph
- Game attendance: 11,363
- TV announcers (ESPN+): Dave Weinstein, Vad Lee, Madison Little

Game information

First quarter

- (7:25) CIT - Ben Barnes 32-yard field goal (Drive: 7 plays, 44 yards, 4:02; The Citadel 3-0)

Second quarter

- (13:46) ETSU - Khamran Laborn 20-yard run, kick failed (Drive: 10 plays, 80 yards, 3:47; East Tennessee State 6-3)
- (7:03) ETSU - Jaylen King 14-yard run, Ewan Johnson kick (Drive: 6 plays, 68 yards, 1:16; East Tennessee State 13-3)

Third quarter

- (10:32) CIT - Garrison Johnson 1-yard run, Ben Barnes kick (Drive: 3 plays, 8 yards, 1:16; East Tennessee State 13-10)

Fourth quarter

- (5:42) ETSU - Khamran Laborn 40-yard run, Ewan Johnson kick (Drive: 7 plays, 80 yards, 4:38; East Tennessee State 20-10)
- (5:31) ETSU - Jimmy Bowdry 0-yard interception, Ewan Johnson kick (East Tennessee State 27-10)
- (3:17) CIT - Tyler Cherry 33-yard pass from Johnathan Bennett, Ben Barnes kick (Drive: 10 plays, 71 yards, 2:07; East Tennessee State 27-17)
- (3:05) ETSU - Bryson Irby 58-yard run, Ewan Johnson kick (Drive: 1 play, 58 yards, 0:11; East Tennessee State 34-17)

| Statistics | ETSU | CIT |
|---|---|---|
| First downs | 22 | 12 |
| Total yards | 460 | 269 |
| Rushing yards | 308 | 81 |
| Passing yards | 152 | 188 |
| Passing: Comp–Att–Int | 13-29-3 | 18-32-1 |
| Time of possession | 29:04 | 30:56 |

| Team | Category | Player | Statistics |
|---|---|---|---|
| East Tennessee State | Passing | Jaylen King | 13/29, 152 yards, 3 INT |
| East Tennessee State | Rushing | Bryson Irby | 14 carries, 126 yards, TD |
| East Tennessee State | Receiving | AJ Johnson | 3 receptions, 47 yards |
| The Citadel | Passing | Johnathan Bennett | 17/31, 187 yards, TD, INT |
| The Citadel | Rushing | Corey Ibrahim | 11 carries, 48 yards |
| The Citadel | Receiving | Tyler Cherry | 2 receptions, 69 yards, TD |

=== Furman (rivalry) ===
Game Six – Furman Paladins (1–3) vs The Citadel Bulldogs (2–3) – Game summary

| Quarter | 1 | 2 | 3 | 4 | Total |
|---|---|---|---|---|---|
| Paladins | 0 | 0 | 3 | 14 | 17 |
| Bulldogs | 10 | 0 | 3 | 3 | 16 |

at Johnson Hagood Stadium • Charleston, SC

- Date: Saturday October 5, 2024
- Game time: 2:00 p.m.
- Game attendance: 9,053
- TV: ESPN+

Game information

First quarter
Second quarter
Third quarter
Fourth quarter

| Statistics | FUR | CIT |
|---|---|---|
| First downs | 17 | 16 |
| Total yards | 274 | 257 |
| Rushing yards | 28 | 154 |
| Passing yards | 246 | 103 |
| Passing: Comp–Att–Int | 23-33-0 | 11-23-1 |
| Time of possession | 22:14 | 37:46 |

| Team | Category | Player | Statistics |
|---|---|---|---|
| Furman | Passing | Trey Hedden | 23/33, 246 yards, 2 TD |
| Furman | Rushing | Myion Hicks | 7 carries, 25 yards |
| Furman | Receiving | Ben Ferguson | 5 receptions, 53 yards, TD |
| The Citadel | Passing | Johnathan Bennett | 11/23, 103 yards, TD, INT |
| The Citadel | Rushing | Johnathan Bennett | 16 carries, 48 yards |
| The Citadel | Receiving | Dervon Pesnell | 4 receptions, 65 yards, TD |

=== at Western Carolina ===
Game Seven – The Citadel Bulldogs (2–4) at Western Carolina Catamounts (2–3) – Game summary

| Quarter | 1 | 2 | 3 | 4 | Total |
|---|---|---|---|---|---|
| Bulldogs | 0 | 7 | 7 | 2 | 16 |
| Catamounts | 7 | 14 | 3 | 6 | 30 |

at Bob Waters Field at E. J. Whitmire Stadium • Cullowhee, NC

- Date: Saturday October 12, 2024
- Game time: 2:30 p.m.
- Game weather: 0 °F (−18 °C)
- Game attendance: 6,278
- TV announcers (ESPN+): TBD

Game information

First quarter
Second quarter
Third quarter
Fourth quarter

| Statistics | CIT | WCU |
|---|---|---|
| First downs | 25 | 26 |
| Total yards | 429 | 396 |
| Rushing yards | 274 | 102 |
| Passing yards | 155 | 294 |
| Passing: Comp–Att–Int | 12-28-2 | 28-38-0 |
| Time of possession | 33:03 | 26:57 |

| Team | Category | Player | Statistics |
|---|---|---|---|
| The Citadel | Passing | Johnathan Bennett | 12/28, 155 yards, 2 INT |
| The Citadel | Rushing | Johnathan Bennett | 22 carries, 155 yards, TD |
| The Citadel | Receiving | Javonte Graves-Billips | 4 receptions, 54 yards |
| Western Carolina | Passing | Cole Gonzales | 28/38, 294 yards, TD |
| Western Carolina | Rushing | Branson Adams | 13 carries, 53 yards |
| Western Carolina | Receiving | Zion Booker | 6 receptions, 102 yards, TD |

=== at VMI (Military Classic of the South) ===
Game Eight – The Citadel Bulldogs (2–5) at VMI Keydets (0–6) – Game summary

| Quarter | 1 | 2 | 3 | 4 | Total |
|---|---|---|---|---|---|
| Bulldogs | 3 | 3 | 0 | 7 | 13 |
| Keydets | 0 | 10 | 0 | 0 | 10 |

at Alumni Memorial Field • Lexington, VA

- Date: Saturday October 19, 2024
- Game time: 1:30 p.m.
- Game weather: 0 °F (−18 °C)
- TV announcers (ESPN+): TBD

Game information

First quarter
Second quarter
Third quarter
Fourth quarter

| Statistics | CIT | VMI |
|---|---|---|
| First downs | 10 | 13 |
| Total yards | 188 | 227 |
| Rushing yards | 107 | 92 |
| Passing yards | 81 | 135 |
| Passing: Comp–Att–Int | 4-6-0 | 12-24-0 |
| Time of possession | 30:17 | 29:43 |

| Team | Category | Player | Statistics |
|---|---|---|---|
| The Citadel | Passing | Johnathan Bennett | 4/6, 81 yards, TD |
| The Citadel | Rushing | Johnathan Bennett | 22 carries, 46 yards |
| The Citadel | Receiving | Tyler Cherry | 3 receptions, 78 yards, TD |
| VMI | Passing | Chandler Wilson | 7/19, 83 yards |
| VMI | Rushing | Hunter Rice | 20 carries, 70 yards, TD |
| VMI | Receiving | Ethen Horne | 2 receptions, 45 yards |

=== Samford ===
Game Nine – Samford Bulldogs (3–3) vs The Citadel Bulldogs (3–5) – Game summary

| Quarter | 1 | 2 | 3 | 4 | Total |
|---|---|---|---|---|---|
| Samford | 0 | 3 | 0 | 8 | 11 |
| The Citadel | 0 | 0 | 14 | 14 | 28 |

at Johnson Hagood Stadium • Charleston, SC

- Date: Saturday October 26, 2024
- Game time: 2:00 p.m.
- Game attendance: 8,977
- TV announcers (ESPN+): TBD

Game information

First quarter
Second quarter
Third quarter
Fourth quarter

| Statistics | SAM | CIT |
|---|---|---|
| First downs | 22 | 14 |
| Total yards | 300 | |
| Rushing yards | 97 | 166 |
| Passing yards | 223 | 134 |
| Passing: Comp–Att–Int | 29-36-2 | 11-18-0 |
| Time of possession | 28:03 | 31:57 |

| Team | Category | Player | Statistics |
|---|---|---|---|
| Samford | Passing | Quincy Crittendon | 29/36, 223 yards, 2 INT |
| Samford | Rushing | Damonta Witherspoon | 9 carries, 41 yards |
| Samford | Receiving | Iaan Cousin | 3 receptions, 47 yards |
| The Citadel | Passing | Johnathan Bennett | 11/18, 134 yards |
| The Citadel | Rushing | Johnathan Bennett | 12 carries, 54 yards, TD |
| The Citadel | Receiving | Dervon Pesnell | 3 receptions, 42 yards |

=== No. 23 Chattanooga ===
Game Ten – No. 23 Chattanooga Mocs (5–4) vs The Citadel Bulldogs (4–5) – Game summary

| Quarter | 1 | 2 | 3 | 4 | Total |
|---|---|---|---|---|---|
| No. 23 Mocs | 0 | 14 | 10 | 7 | 31 |
| Bulldogs | 0 | 0 | 7 | 0 | 7 |

at Johnson Hagood Stadium • Charleston, SC

- Date: Saturday November 9, 2024
- Game time: 2:00 p.m.
- Game attendance: 12,513
- TV announcers (ESPN+): TBD

Game information

First quarter
Second quarter
Third quarter
Fourth quarter

| Statistics | UTC | CIT |
|---|---|---|
| First downs | 22 | 11 |
| Total yards | 377 | 277 |
| Rushing yards | 246 | 233 |
| Passing yards | 131 | 44 |
| Passing: Comp–Att–Int | 8-15-0 | 5-15-1 |
| Time of possession | 32:11 | 27:49 |

| Team | Category | Player | Statistics |
|---|---|---|---|
| Chattanooga | Passing | Luke Schomburg | 8/15, 131 yards, 2 TD |
| Chattanooga | Rushing | Reggie Davis | 18 carries, 115 yards |
| Chattanooga | Receiving | Chris Domercant | 2 receptions, 69 yards, 1 TD |
| The Citadel | Passing | Johnathan Bennett | 5/10, 44 yards, 1 INT |
| The Citadel | Rushing | Johnathan Bennett | 8 carries, 66 yards |
| The Citadel | Receiving | Javonte Graves-Billips | 1 reception, 19 yards |

=== Wofford (rivalry) ===
Game Eleven – The Citadel Bulldogs (4–6) vs Wofford Terriers (5–5) – Game summary

| Quarter | 1 | 2 | 3 | 4 | Total |
|---|---|---|---|---|---|
| Bulldogs | 3 | 10 | 10 | 7 | 30 |
| Terriers | 14 | 3 | 0 | 0 | 17 |

at Gibbs Stadium • Spartanburg, SC

- Date: Saturday November 16, 2024
- Game time: 1:30 p.m.
- Game attendance: 4,341
- TV announcers (ESPN+): TBD

Game information

First quarter
Second quarter
Third quarter
Fourth quarter

| Statistics | CIT | WOF |
|---|---|---|
| First downs | 20 | 15 |
| Total yards | 357 | 267 |
| Rushing yards | 191 | 108 |
| Passing yards | 166 | 159 |
| Passing: Comp–Att–Int | 11-18-0 | 14-21-1 |
| Time of possession | 35:47 | 24:13 |

| Team | Category | Player | Statistics |
|---|---|---|---|
| The Citadel | Passing | Johnathan Bennett | 11/18, 166 yards, 2 TD |
| The Citadel | Rushing | Cooper Wallace | 9 carries, 84 yards, 1 TD |
| The Citadel | Receiving | Javonte Graves-Billips | 4 receptions, 68 yards, 2 TD |
| Wofford | Passing | Amari Odom | 14/21, 159 yards, 1 TD, 1 INT |
| Wofford | Rushing | Ryan Ingram | 12 carries, 103 yards |
| Wofford | Receiving | Dylan Djete | 3 receptions, 42 yards |

=== No. 17 (FBS) Clemson ===
Game Twelve – The Citadel Bulldogs (5–6) vs No. 17 (FBS) Clemson Tigers (8–2) – Game summary

| Quarter | 1 | 2 | 3 | 4 | Total |
|---|---|---|---|---|---|
| Bulldogs | 0 | 0 | 7 | 7 | 14 |
| No. 17 (FBS) Tigers | 14 | 21 | 10 | 6 | 51 |

at Memorial Stadium • Clemson, SC

- Date: Saturday November 23, 2024
- Game time: 1:30 p.m.
- Game weather: Temperature: 60 °F (16 °C) • Wind: NE 2 mph • Weather: Sunny
- Game attendance: 80,300
- Referee: Tim Hedgepeth
- TV announcers (The CW): Thom Brennaman (play-by-play), Max Browne (analyst) and Treavor Scales (sideline)

Game information

First quarter

- (08:10) Clemson – Antonio Williams 30-yard pass from Cade Klubnik, Nolan Hauser kick (Drive: 5 plays, 78 yards, 1:47; Clemson 7–0)
- (03:17) Clemson – Peyton Page 57 yard interception return, Hauser kick (Drive: N/A, Clemson 14–0)

Second quarter

- (10:49) Clemson – Bryant Wesco Jr. 55-yard pass from Klubnik, Hauser kick (Drive: 7 plays, 80 yards, 2:33; Clemson 21–0)
- (06:07) Clemson – Jay Haynes 70-yard rush, Hauser kick (Drive: 4 plays, 90 yards, 1:50; Clemson 28–0)
- (01:02) Clemson – Haynes 9-yard rush, Hauser kick (Drive: 9 plays, 80 yards, 3:33; Clemson 35–0)

Third quarter

- (13:13) Clemson – Williams 9-yard pass from Klubnik, Hogan Morton kick (Drive: 4 plays, 49 yards, 1:45; Clemson 42–0)
- (05:06) The Citadel – Garrison Johnson 9-yard rush, Ben Barnes kick (Drive: 14 plays, 75 yards, 8:07; Clemson 42–7)
- (00:57) Clemson – Hauser 32-yard field goal (Drive: 9 plays, 50 yards, 4:03; Clemson 45–7)

Fourth quarter

- (10:31) The Citadel – Javonte Graves-Billips 66-yard pass from Johnathan Bennett, Barnes kick (Drive: 2 plays, 72 yards, 0:48; Clemson 45–14)
- (06:25) Clemson – Barrett Carter 4-yard rush, Morton kick blocked (Drive: 9 plays, 70 yards, 4:00; Clemson 51–14)

| Statistics | CIT | CLEM |
|---|---|---|
| First downs | 15 | 27 |
| Total yards | 387 | 562 |
| Rushing yards | 288 | 302 |
| Passing yards | 99 | 260 |
| Passing: Comp–Att–Int | 3–11–1 | 18–31–1 |
| Time of possession | 35:42 | 24:18 |

| Team | Category | Player | Statistics |
|---|---|---|---|
| The Citadel | Passing | Johnathan Bennett | 2/10, 90 yards, TD, INT |
| The Citadel | Rushing | Johnny Crawford III | 7 carries, 70 yards |
| The Citadel | Receiving | Javonte Graves-Billips | 2 receptions, 90 yards, TD |
| Clemson | Passing | Cade Klubnik | 12/16, 198 yards, 3 TD |
| Clemson | Rushing | Jay Haynes | 5 carries, 118 yards, 2 TD |
| Clemson | Receiving | Bryant Wesco Jr. | 3 receptions, 75 yards, TD |
