= 2024 Western Carolina Catamounts football team =

American college football season

2024 Western Carolina Catamounts football
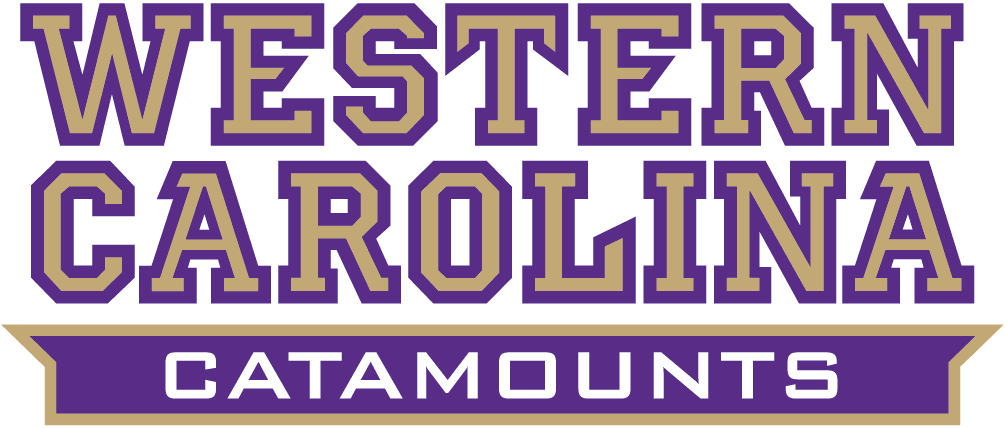
- Conference: Southern Conference
- Record: 7–5 (6–2 SoCon)
- Head coach: Kerwin Bell (4th season)
- Offensive coordinator: Rylan Wells (1st season)
- Defensive coordinator: Jerry Odom (1st season)
- Home stadium: Bob Waters Field at E. J. Whitmire Stadium

2024 Southern Conference football standings
	Conf.			Overall
Team	W		L	W		L
No. 8 Mercer $^	7	–	1	11	–	3
Western Carolina	6	–	2	7	–	5
Chattanooga	5	–	3	7	–	5
East Tennessee State	5	–	3	7	–	5
Samford	3	–	4	4	–	7
The Citadel	3	–	5	5	–	7
Wofford	3	–	5	5	–	7
Furman	2	–	5	3	–	8
VMI	1	–	7	1	–	11
$ – Conference champion; ^ – FCS playoff participant; Rankings from STATS Poll

The 2024 Western Carolina Catamounts football team represented Western Carolina University as a member of the Southern Conference (SoCon) during the 2024 NCAA Division I FCS football season. The Catamounts were coached by fourth-year head coach Kerwin Bell and played at Bob Waters Field at E. J. Whitmire Stadium in Cullowhee, North Carolina.

== Schedule ==
Date	Time	Opponent	Rank	Site	TV	Result	Attendance
August 29	7:00 p.m.	at No. 24 (FBS) NC State*	No. 20	Carter–Finley Stadium; Raleigh, NC	ACCN	L 21–38	56,919
September 7	1:00 p.m.	Campbell*	No. 17	Bob Waters Field at E. J. Whitmire Stadium; Cullowhee, NC	ESPN+	L 16–24	12,506
September 14	6:00 p.m.	at No. 22 Elon*		Rhodes Stadium; Elon, NC	FloSports/WMYV	W 24–17	5,104
September 21	3:00 p.m.	at No. 9 Montana*	No. 24	Washington–Grizzly Stadium; Missoula, MT	ESPN+	L 35–46	25,720
October 5	2:30 p.m.	Wofford		Bob Waters Field at E. J. Whitmire Stadium; Cullowhee, NC	ESPN+	W 21–17	Behind closed doors
October 12	2:30 p.m.	The Citadel		Bob Waters Field at E. J. Whitmire Stadium; Cullowhee, NC	ESPN+	W 30–16	6,278
October 19	2:00 p.m.	at Furman		Paladin Stadium; Greenville, SC	ESPN+	W 52–20	9,897
October 26	3:30 p.m.	at No. 14 Mercer	No. 24	Fiver Star Stadium; Macon, GA	ESPN+	L 34–44	7,389
November 2	2:30 p.m.	No. 18 Chattanooga^{†}		Bob Waters Field at E. J. Whitmire Stadium; Cullowhee, NC	ESPN+	W 38–34	11,198
November 9	12:00 p.m.	at East Tennessee State	No. 22	William B. Greene Jr. Stadium; Johnson City, TN	ESPN+	L 21–24	12,109
November 16	1:00 p.m.	VMI		Bob Waters Field at E. J. Whitmire Stadium; Cullowhee, NC	ESPN+	W 58–28	13,022
November 23	3:00 p.m.	at Samford		Pete Hanna Stadium; Homewood, AL	ESPN+	W 47–42	4,723
*Non-conference game; ^{†}Homecoming; Rankings from STATS Poll released prior to the game; All times are in Eastern time

== Game summaries ==
=== at No. 24 (FBS) NC State ===
Game One – No. 20 Western Carolina Catamounts (0–0) at No. 24 (FBS) NC State Wolfpack (0–0) – Game summary

Quarter	1	2	3	4	Total
No. 20 Catamounts	14	0	7	0	21
No. 24 (FBS) Wolfpack	7	7	3	21	38

at Carter–Finley Stadium • Raleigh, NC

- Date: August 29, 2024
- Game time: 7:00 p.m.
- Game weather: Sunny, 88 °F (31 °C)
- Game attendance: 56,919
- Referee: Riley Johnson
- TV announcers (ACCN): Wes Durham (play-by-play), Tom Luginbill (analyst), and Dawn Boyle (sideline reporter)

Game information

First quarter

- (5:55) WCU – Jake Young 8-yard pass from Cole Gonzales (Christian Lowery kick) (Drive: 1 play, 8 yards, 0:08; Western Carolina 7-0)
- (2:39) NCST – Kevin Concepcion 17-yard pass from Grayson McCall (Kanoah Vinesett kick) (Drive: 7 plays, 75 yards, 3:16; Tied 7-7)
- (0:05) WCU – AJ Colombo 12-yard pass from Cole Gonzales (Christian Lowery kick) (Drive: 6 plays, 75 yards, 2:34; Western Carolina 14-7)

Second quarter

- (12:03) NCST – Kevin Concepcion 5-yard pass from Grayson McCall (Kanoah Vinesett kick) (Drive: 7 plays, 75 yards, 3:02; Tied 14-14)

Third quarter

- (8:00) NCST – Kanoah Vinesett 46-yard field goal (Drive: 14 plays, 39 yards, 6:52; NC State 17-14)
- (4:36) WCU – Branson Adams 17-yard run (Christian Lowery kick) (Drive: 6 plays, 75 yards, 3:24; Western Carolina 21-17)

Fourth quarter

- (14:45) NCST – Kevin Concepcion 35-yard pass from Grayson McCall (Kanoah Vinesett kick) (Drive: 5 plays, 51 yards, 0:47; NC State 24-21)
- (6:33) NCST – Jordan Waters 7-yard run (Kanoah Vinesett kick) (Drive: 9 plays, 81 yards, 5:31; NC State 31-21)
- (1:50) NCST – Jordan Waters 50-yard run (Kanoah Vinesett kick) (Drive: 5 plays, 80 yards, 2:28; NC State 38-21)

Statistics	WCU	NCST
First downs	16	28
Total yards	58–364	73–521
Rushing yards	18–123	33–203
Passing yards	241	318
Passing: Comp–Att–Int	24–40–0	26–40–1
Time of possession	24:30	35:30

Team	Category	Player	Statistics
Western Carolina	Passing	Cole Gonzales	22/35, 211 yards, 2 TD
Western Carolina	Rushing	Cole Gonzales	6 carries, 75 yards
Western Carolina	Receiving	AJ Colombo	9 receptions, 97 yards, TD
NC State	Passing	Grayson McCall	26/40, 318 yards, 3 TD, INT
NC State	Rushing	Jordan Waters	20 carries, 123 yards, 2 TD
NC State	Receiving	Kevin Concepcion	9 receptions, 121 yards, 3 TD

=== Campbell ===
Game Two – Campbell Fighting Camels (0–1) at No. 17 Western Carolina Catamounts (0–1) – Game summary

Quarter	1	2	3	4	Total
Fighting Camels	0	0	0	0	0
No. 17 Catamounts	0	0	0	0	0

at Bob Waters Field at E. J. Whitmire Stadium • Cullowhee, NC

- Date: September 7, 2024
- Game time: 2:30 p.m.
- TV: ESPN+

Game information

First quarter
Second quarter
Third quarter
Fourth quarter

Statistics	CAM	WCU
First downs		
Total yards		
Rushing yards		
Passing yards		
Passing: Comp–Att–Int		
Time of possession		

Team	Category	Player	Statistics
Campbell	Passing		
Campbell	Rushing		
Campbell	Receiving		
Western Carolina	Passing		
Western Carolina	Rushing		
Western Carolina	Receiving		

=== at No. 22 Elon ===
Game Three – Western Carolina Catamounts (0–2) vs No. 22 Elon Phoenix (1–1) – Game summary

Quarter	1	2	3	4	Total
Catamounts	0	0	0	0	0
No. 22 Phoenix	0	0	0	0	0

at Rhodes Stadium, Elon, NC

- Date: Saturday September 14, 2024
- Game time: 6:00 PM
- TV: FloSports

Game information

First quarter
Second quarter
Third quarter
Fourth quarter

Statistics	WCU	ELON
First downs		
Total yards		
Rushing yards		
Passing yards		
Passing: Comp–Att–Int		
Time of possession		

Team	Category	Player	Statistics
Western Carolina	Passing		
Western Carolina	Rushing		
Western Carolina	Receiving		
Elon	Passing		
Elon	Rushing		
Elon	Receiving		

=== at No. 9 Montana ===
Game Four – No. 24 Western Carolina Catamounts (1–2) vs No. 9 Montana Grizzlies (2–1) – Game summary

Quarter	1	2	3	4	Total
No. 24 Catamounts	14	13	0	8	35
No. 9 Grizzlies	0	21	14	11	46

at Washington–Grizzly Stadium, Missoula, MT

- Date: Saturday September 21, 2024
- Game time: 3:00 PM
- Game attendance: 25,720
- TV announcers (ESPN+): Jay Kohn (play-by-play), Marty Mornhinweg (analyst) and Kyle Hansen (sideline)

Game information

First quarter
Second quarter
Third quarter
Fourth quarter

Statistics	WCU	MONT
First downs		
Total yards		
Rushing yards		
Passing yards		
Passing: Comp–Att–Int		
Time of possession		

Team	Category	Player	Statistics
Western Carolina	Passing		
Western Carolina	Rushing		
Western Carolina	Receiving		
Montana	Passing		
Montana	Rushing		
Montana	Receiving		

=== Wofford ===
Game Five – Wofford Terriers (2–2) at Western Carolina Catamounts (1–3) – Game summary

Quarter	1	2	3	4	Total
Terriers	0	0	0	0	0
Catamounts	0	0	0	0	0

at Bob Waters Field at E. J. Whitmire Stadium • Cullowhee, NC

- Date: Saturday October 5, 2024
- Game time: 2:30 p.m.
- Game weather: 0 °F (−18 °C)
- Game attendance: 6,278
- TV announcers (ESPN+): TBD

Game information

First quarter
Second quarter
Third quarter
Fourth quarter

Statistics	WOF	WCU
First downs		
Total yards		
Rushing yards		
Passing yards		
Passing: Comp–Att–Int		
Time of possession		

Team	Category	Player	Statistics
Wofford	Passing		
Wofford	Rushing		
Wofford	Receiving		
Western Carolina	Passing		
Western Carolina	Rushing		
Western Carolina	Receiving		

=== The Citadel ===
Game Six – The Citadel Bulldogs (2–4) at Western Carolina Catamounts (2–3) – Game summary

Quarter	1	2	3	4	Total
Bulldogs	0	0	0	0	0
Catamounts	0	0	0	0	0

at Bob Waters Field at E. J. Whitmire Stadium • Cullowhee, NC

- Date: Saturday October 12, 2024
- Game time: 2:30 p.m.
- Game weather: 0 °F (−18 °C)
- TV announcers (ESPN+): TBD

Game information

First quarter
Second quarter
Third quarter
Fourth quarter

Statistics	CIT	WCU
First downs		
Total yards		
Rushing yards		
Passing yards		
Passing: Comp–Att–Int		
Time of possession		

Team	Category	Player	Statistics
The Citadel	Passing		
The Citadel	Rushing		
The Citadel	Receiving		
Western Carolina	Passing		
Western Carolina	Rushing		
Western Carolina	Receiving		

=== at Furman ===
Game Seven – Western Carolina Catamounts (3–3) vs Furman Paladins (2–4) – Game summary

Quarter	1	2	3	4	Total
Catamounts	0	0	0	0	0
Paladins	0	0	0	0	0

at Paladin Stadium, Greenville, SC

- Date: Saturday October 19, 2024
- Game time: 2:00 PM
- TV: ESPN+

Game information

First quarter
Second quarter
Third quarter
Fourth quarter

Statistics	WCU	FUR
First downs		
Total yards		
Rushing yards		
Passing yards		
Passing: Comp–Att–Int		
Time of possession		

Team	Category	Player	Statistics
Western Carolina	Passing		
Western Carolina	Rushing		
Western Carolina	Receiving		
Furman	Passing		
Furman	Rushing		
Furman	Receiving		

=== at No. 14 Mercer ===
Game Eight – No. 24 Western Carolina Catamounts (4–3) vs No. 14 Mercer Bears (6–1) – Game summary

Quarter	1	2	3	4	Total
No. 24 Catamounts	0	0	0	0	0
No. 14 Bears	0	0	0	0	0

at Five Star Stadium, Macon, GA

- Date: Saturday October 26, 2024
- Game time: 3:30 PM
- TV: ESPN+

Game information

First quarter
Second quarter
Third quarter
Fourth quarter

Statistics	WCU	MER
First downs		
Total yards		
Rushing yards		
Passing yards		
Passing: Comp–Att–Int		
Time of possession		

Team	Category	Player	Statistics
Western Carolina	Passing		
Western Carolina	Rushing		
Western Carolina	Receiving		
Mercer	Passing		
Mercer	Rushing		
Mercer	Receiving		

=== No. 18 Chattanooga ===
Game Nine – No. 18 Chattanooga Mocs (5–3) vs Western Carolina Catamounts (4–4) – Game summary

Quarter	1	2	3	4	Total
No. 18 Mocs	0	0	0	0	0
Catamounts	0	0	0	0	0

at Bob Waters Field at E. J. Whitmire Stadium, Cullowhee, NC

- Date: Saturday November 2, 2024
- Game time: 2:30 p.m.
- TV: ESPN+

Game information

First quarter
Second quarter
Third quarter
Fourth quarter

Statistics	UTC	WCU
First downs		
Total yards		
Rushing yards		
Passing yards		
Passing: Comp–Att–Int		
Time of possession		

Team	Category	Player	Statistics
Chattanooga	Passing		
Chattanooga	Rushing		
Chattanooga	Receiving		
Western Carolina	Passing		
Western Carolina	Rushing		
Western Carolina	Receiving		

=== at East Tennessee State ===
Game Ten – No. 22 Western Carolina Catamounts (5–4) vs East Tennessee State Buccaneers (5–4) – Game summary

Quarter	1	2	3	4	Total
No. 22 Catmounts	7	0	14	0	21
Buccaneers	10	0	7	7	24

at William B. Greene Jr. Stadium, Johnson City, TN

- Date: Saturday November 9, 2024
- Game time: 12:00 PM
- Game weather: Sunny • Temperature: 71 °F (22 °C) • Wind: W 7 mph
- Game attendance: 12,109
- Referee: Bruce Austin
- TV announcers (ESPN+): Mike Gallagher (play-by-play), Mark Hutsell (analyst)

Game information

First quarter

- (9:54) ETSU - Ewan Johnson 40-yard field goal (Drive: 12 plays, 53 yards, 5:06; East Tennessee State 3-0)
- (8:51) ETSU - Ephraim Floyd 13-yard pass from Gino English, Ewan Johnson kick (Drive: 2 plays, 21 yards, 0:53; East Tennessee State 10-0)
- (1:15) WCU - Jake Young 11-yard pass from Taron Dickens, Christian Lowery kick (Drive: 5 plays, 72 yards, 1:44; East Tennessee State 10-7)

Second quarter
Third quarter

- (13:30) ETSU - Xavier Gaillardetz 23-yard pass from Gino English, Ewan Johnson kick (Drive: 3 plays, 26 yards, 1:17; East Tennessee State 17-7)
- (5:38) WCU - Taron Dickens 2-yard run, Christina Lowery kick (Drive: 9 plays, 71 yards, 3:19; East Tennessee State 17-14)
- (0:26) WCU - Taron Dickens 8-yard run, Christian Lowery kick (Drive: 9 plays, 55 yards, 3:44; Western Carolina 21-17)

Fourth quarter

- (5:55) ETSU - Devontae Houston 14-yard run, Ewan Johnson kick (Drive: 5 plays, 28 yards, 2:20; East Tennessee State 24-21)

Statistics	WCU	ETSU
First downs	20	21
Total yards	352	328
Rushing yards	119	174
Passing yards	233	154
Passing: Comp–Att–Int	26-36-1	11-24-4
Time of possession	29:30	30:30

Team	Category	Player	Statistics
Western Carolina	Passing	Taron Dickens	24-34, 233 yards, TD, INT
Western Carolina	Rushing	Branson Adams	14 carries, 81 yards
Western Carolina	Receiving	Zion Booker	5 receptions, 85 yards
East Tennessee State	Passing	Gino English	11-23, 154 yards, 2 TD, 3 INT
East Tennessee State	Rushing	Bryson Irby	21 carries, 79 yards
East Tennessee State	Receiving	AJ Johnson	2 receptions, 58 yards

=== VMI ===
Game Eleven – VMI Keydets (1–9) vs Western Carolina Catamounts (5–5) – Game summary

Quarter	1	2	3	4	Total
Keydets	0	0	0	0	0
Catamounts	0	0	0	0	0

at Bob Waters Field at E. J. Whitmire Stadium, Cullowhee, NC

- Date: Saturday November 16, 2024
- Game time: 1:00 p.m.
- TV: ESPN+

Game information

First quarter
Second quarter
Third quarter
Fourth quarter

Statistics	VMI	WCU
First downs		
Total yards		
Rushing yards		
Passing yards		
Passing: Comp–Att–Int		
Time of possession		

Team	Category	Player	Statistics
VMI	Passing		
VMI	Rushing		
VMI	Receiving		
Western Carolina	Passing		
Western Carolina	Rushing		
Western Carolina	Receiving		

=== at Samford ===
Game Twelve – Western Carolina Catamounts (6–5) at Samford Bulldogs (4–6) – Game summary

Quarter	1	2	3	4	Total
Catamounts	0	0	0	0	0
Bulldogs	0	0	0	0	0

at Pete Hanna Stadium • Homewood, AL

- Date: Saturday November 23, 2024
- Game time: 3:00 p.m. EST
- Game weather: 0 °F (−18 °C)
- TV: ESPN+

Game information

First quarter
Second quarter
Third quarter
Fourth quarter

Statistics	WCU	SAM
First downs		
Total yards		
Rushing yards		
Passing yards		
Passing: Comp–Att–Int		
Time of possession		

Team	Category	Player	Statistics
Western Carolina	Passing		
Western Carolina	Rushing		
Western Carolina	Receiving		
Samford	Passing		
Samford	Rushing		
Samford	Receiving		

== Roster ==
2024 Western Carolina Catamounts football team roster
Players
Coaches
Offense

Pos.	#	Name	Class
WR	0	AJ Colombo	Jr
WR	1	Zion Booker	So
RB	2	Branson Adams	Jr
WR	3	Calvin Jones	Jr
WR	4	De'Andre Tamarez	So
RB	5	Jalynn Williams	Sr
RB	6	Corey Reddick Jr.	So
WR	7	Malik Knight	So
QB	8	Taron Dickens	Fr
QB	9	Cole Gonzales	Jr
WR	10	Patrick Boyd Jr.	Fr
QB	11	Jefferson Boaz	Jr
QB	12	Brody Palhegyi	Jr
WR	13	Santana Fleming	Fr
QB	14	Nate Blair	Fr
WR	15	Jai Boyd	Fr
WR	16	James Tyre	Fr
QB	17	Bennett Judy	Fr
WR	18	Isaiah Johnson	Fr
QB	19	Isaac Lee	Fr
WR	19	James Randle	Fr
RB	20	Jalen Ibrahim	So
RB	21	Jaiden Bond	Jr
TE	22	Trey Ritch	Fr
RB	24	Brandon Benjamin	Jr
RB	25	Marlin Cochran	Fr
RB	27	Joshua Collins	Fr
RB	28	Markel Townsend	Fr
TE	42	Caden Robinson	Fr
TE	44	Isaac McLellan	So
OL	51	Aaron Sanez	So
OL	52	Manasseh Ripert	Jr
OL	53	Zach Watson	Fr
OL	55	Secrea Algie	Fr
OL	58	Brett Gray	Jr
OL	60	Therion Cannon	Jr
OL	62	Peyton Davis	So
OL	65	Camden Myers	Fr
OL	66	Derek Simmons	Sr
OL	67	Steven Hamby	Fr
OL	68	Dale Greene	Fr
OL	69	Caleb Williford	Fr
OL	71	Cade McClellan	So
OL	72	Blake Whitmore	Sr
OL	73	Xavier Graham	Sr
OL	74	Jordan Daniels	Sr
OL	75	Caleb Carter	Jr
OL	76	Nathan Linkous	Jr
OL	78	Evan Carney	So
WR	81	Ca'Lique Cunningham	So
WR	82	Matthew Keener	Fr
WR	83	Austin Cunningham	Fr
WR	84	Brandon Poteat	Jr
TE	85	David Hulbert	Fr
TE	86	Brayden Blackmon	Jr
TE	87	Jake Young	So
WR	88	Jemarious Reaves	Fr
TE	89	Bode Burns	Fr

Defense

Pos.	#	Name	Class
CB	0	Ken Moore Jr.	So
S	1	Mateo Sudipo	Sr
DE	2	Micah Nelson	Sr
CB	3	Samaurie Dukes	Jr
CB	4	CJ Williams	Sr
LB	5	Hayward McQueen Jr.	Jr
DL	6	Curtis Fann Jr.	Sr
S	7	Ed Jones IV	Sr
DL	8	Jaquarius Guinn	Sr
CB	9	Darian Anderson Jr.	So
DL	10	Tahjae Mullix	Jr
DL	11	Caleb Fisher	Jr
DB	12	Amarian Robinson	GS
DB	13	Quez Royal	Sr
DB	14	Armond Anderson	Jr
LB	15	Antoine Williams	Sr
CB	16	Jordy Lowery	So
DE	17	Kenyon Partridge	Fr
LB	18	Antarron Turner	So
DL	19	Chris Morgan	Sr
LB	20	Wesley Scott	GS
DB	21	Bo Simpson-Nealy	Fr
LB	22	Jeno Junius Jr.	Fr
DB	24	Zayveon Wells	Fr
DB	25	Nicholas Kilpatrick	Fr
S	26	Na'koma Simpson-Nealy	Fr
DB	27	Hasaan Sykes	Fr
S	29	Jhamari Pierre-Louis	So
DL	30	Richard Garrett	So
CB	31	Don Robinson III	So
DB, LS	32	Walter Gibson	Sr
DB	32	Trevaughn Martinez	Fr
S	33	Lee Campbell	Jr
DB	34	Rashad Snow	Fr
LB	35	Christian Murphy	So
S	36	Ja'Morri Downing	So
DB	37	Cam Smith	Fr
DB	38	Canden McGill	Fr
S	39	Julian Quintero	Fr
S	40	Cory Hennings	Jr
S	41	Drew Hollifield	Fr
DL	45	Justin Wallace	So
LB	47	Blue Monroe	So
DL	50	Edwin Moore Jr.	Fr
DL	57	Caleb Turner-Allen	Fr
LB	58	Daimean Fernandez	Fr
LB	59	Beady Waddell V	Fr
DL	90	Jamichael Wilson	GS
DL	91	Ugo Nosike	Jr
DL	92	Vanier Baptiste III	Fr
DL	93	Adrian Stone	Fr
DL	94	Jaden Meeks	Fr
DL	97	Caleb Bradford	Jr
DL	98	Jackson Hensley	Fr
DL	99	Jordan Cardentey	Fr

Special teams

Pos.	#	Name	Class
K	43	Maddox Cowart	Fr
K	46	Paxton Robertson	Sr
LS	48	Colby Cross	Sr
K	49	Corbin Shirley	So
LS	56	Mabry Bumgarner	Fr
P	95	Stephen Brantley	So
K	96	Christian Lowery	Jr

Head coach

- Kerwin Bell

Coordinators/assistant coaches

- Jerry Odom – Defensive coordinator
- Rylan Wells – Offensive coordinator/recruiting coordinator
- Cody Edwards – Special teams coordinator/linebackers
- Brian Cochran – Defensive line
- Kyle Dickey – Tight ends
- Malik Goodman – Safeties
- Jeremy King – Offensive line
- Greg McGruder – Wide receivers
- Larry Murphy – Cornerbacks/assistant special teams
- Rudi Small – Running backs/assistant special teams

Legend

- (C) Team captain
- (S) Suspended
- (I) Ineligible
- Injured
- Redshirt

Roster
Last update: November 29, 2024

== Statistics ==
=== Team ===
	Western Carolina	Opp
Scoring		
Points per Game		
Points per Turnovers		
First downs		
Rushing		
Passing		
Penalty		
Rushing yards		
Avg per play		
Avg per game		
Rushing touchdowns		
Passing yards		
Att-Comp-Int		
Avg per pass		
Avg per catch		
Avg per game		
Passing touchdowns		
Total offense		
Plays		
Avg per play		
Avg per game		
Fumbles-Lost		
Penalties-Yards		
Avg per game		

	Western Carolina	Opp
Punt-Yards		
Avg per play		
Avg per punt net		
Punt Return-Yards		
Avg per punt return		
Kickoffs-Yards		
Avg per play		
Avg per kick net		
Kickoff Return-Yards		
Avg per kickoff return		
Interceptions-Yards		
Avg per play		
Time of possession / game		
3rd Down Conversions (Pct%)	(0%)	(0%)
4th Down Conversions (Pct%)	(0%)	(0%)
Touchdowns Scored		
Field Goals-Attempts		
PAT-Attempts		
2 point conversion-attempts		
Sack by Yards		
Misc Yards		
Safeties		
Onside kicks		
Red zone scores	(0%)	(0%)
Red zone touchdowns	(0%)	(0%)
Attendance		
Date/Avg per date		
Neutral Site		

=== Individual leaders ===
Passing statistics
#	NAME	POS	RAT	CMP-ATT-INT	YDS	AVG/G	CMP%	TD	LONG
		QB	0.0	0-0-0	0 yrds		0.0%	0 TDs	0
	TOTALS		0.0	0-0-0	0 yrds	0.0	0.0%	0 TDs	0

Rushing statistics
#	NAME	POS	ATT	GAIN	AVG	TD	LONG	AVG/G
		RB	0	0 yrds	0.0	0 TDs	0	0.0
	TOTALS		0	0 yrds	0.0	0 TDs	0	0.0

Receiving statistics
#	NAME	POS	CTH	YDS	AVG	TD	LONG	AVG/G
		WR	0	0 yrds	0.0	0 TDs	0	0.0
	TOTALS		0	0 yrds	0.0	0 TDs	0	0.0

==== Defense ====
Defense statistics
#	NAME	POS	SOLO	AST	TOT	TFL-YDS	SACK-YDS	INT-YDS-TD	BU	QBH	RCV-YDS	FF	BLK	SAF
			0	0	0	0-0 yrds	0-0 yrds	-	-	-	-	-	-	-
	TOTAL		0	0	0	0-0 yrds	0-0 yrds	0-0 yrds- 0 TDs	0	0	-	0	0	-

Key: POS: Position, SOLO: Solo Tackles, AST: Assisted Tackles, TOT: Total Tackles, TFL: Tackles-for-loss, SACK: Quarterback Sacks, INT: Interceptions, BU: Passes Broken Up, PD: Passes Defended, QBH: Quarterback Hits, FR: Fumbles Recovered, FF: Forced Fumbles, BLK: Kicks or Punts Blocked, SAF: Safeties, TD : Touchdown

==== Special teams ====
Kicking/off statistics
#	NAME	POS	XPM-XPA (XP%)	FGM-FGA (FG%)	1–19	20–29	30–39	40–49	50+	PTS	LNG	KICKS	YDS	AVG	TB	OB
		PK	0-0 (0.0%)	0-0 (0.0%)	-/-	-/-	-/-	-/-	-/-	0 pts	0	0	0 yrds	0.0	0	-
	TOTALS		0-0 (0.0%)	0-0 (0.0%)	-/-	-/-	-/-	-/-	-/-	0	0	0	0 yrds	0.0	0	-

Punting statistics
#	NAME	POS	PUNTS	YDS	AVG	LONG	TB	FC	I–20	50+	BLK
		P	-	-	-	-	-	-	-	-	-
	Team	--	0	-	-	-	-	-	-	-	0
	TOTALS		0	0 yrds	0.0	0	0	0	0	0	0

Kick return statistics
#	NAME	POS	RTNS	YDS	AVG	TD	LNG
			-	-	-	-	-
	TOTALS		0	0 yrds	0.0	0 TD's	0

Punt return statistics
#	NAME	POS	RTNS	YDS	AVG	TD	LONG
			-	-	-	-	-
	TOTALS		0	0 yrds	0.0	0 TD's	0
