= 2024 Chattanooga Mocs football team =

American college football season

2024 Chattanooga Mocs football
- Conference: Southern Conference
- Record: 7–5 (5–3 SoCon)
- Head coach: Rusty Wright (6th season)
- Offensive coordinator: Joe Pizzo (6th season)
- Defensive coordinator: Lorenzo Ward (6th season)
- Home stadium: Finley Stadium

2024 Southern Conference football standings
	Conf.			Overall
Team	W		L	W		L
No. 8 Mercer $^	7	–	1	11	–	3
Western Carolina	6	–	2	7	–	5
Chattanooga	5	–	3	7	–	5
East Tennessee State	5	–	3	7	–	5
Samford	3	–	4	4	–	7
The Citadel	3	–	5	5	–	7
Wofford	3	–	5	5	–	7
Furman	2	–	5	3	–	8
VMI	1	–	7	1	–	11
$ – Conference champion; ^ – FCS playoff participant; Rankings from STATS Poll

The 2024 Chattanooga Mocs football team represented the University of Tennessee at Chattanooga as a member of the Southern Conference (SoCon) during the 2024 NCAA Division I FCS football season. The Mocs were coached by sixth-year head coach Rusty Wright and played at Finley Stadium in Chattanooga, Tennessee.

== Schedule ==
Date	Time	Opponent	Rank	Site	TV	Result	Attendance
August 31	12:45 p.m.	at No. 15 (FBS) Tennessee*	No. 9	Neyland Stadium; Knoxville, TN	SECN	L 3–69	101,915
September 7	7:00 p.m.	at Georgia State*	No. 11	Center Parc Stadium; Atlanta, GA	ESPN+	L 21–24	N/A
September 14	6:00 p.m.	No. 23 Mercer	No. 14	Finley Stadium; Chattanooga, TN	ESPN+	L 3–10	7,671
September 28	6:00 p.m.	Portland State*		Finley Stadium; Chattanooga, TN	ESPN+	W 45–30	6,023
October 5	3:30 p.m.	at No. 23 East Tennessee State		William B. Greene Jr. Stadium; Johnson City, TN	ESPN+	W 17–10	10,534
October 12	2:00 p.m.	at Furman	No. 23	Paladin Stadium; Greenville, SC	ESPN+	W 41–10	6,927
October 19	1:30 p.m.	Wofford	No. 19	Finley Stadium; Chattanooga, TN	ESPN+	W 37–5	7,260
October 26	4:00 p.m.	VMI^{†}	No. 19	Finley Stadium; Chattanooga, TN	ESPN+	W 31–10	8,071
November 2	2:30 p.m.	at Western Carolina	No. 18	Bob Waters Field at E. J. Whitmire Stadium; Cullowhee, NC	ESPN+	L 34–38	11,198
November 9	2:00 p.m.	at The Citadel	No. 23	Johnson Hagood Stadium; Charleston, SC	ESPN+	W 31–7	12,513
November 16	1:30 p.m.	Samford	No. 19	Finley Stadium; Chattanooga, TN	ESPN+	L 13–36	7,691
November 23	2:00 p.m.	at Austin Peay*		Fortera Stadium; Clarksville, TN	ESPN+	W 24–17	6,105
*Non-conference game; ^{†}Homecoming; Rankings from STATS Poll released prior to the game; All times are in Eastern time

== Game summaries ==
=== at No. 15 (FBS) Tennessee ===
Game One – No. 9 Chattanooga Mocs (0–0) vs No. 15 (FBS) Tennessee Volunteers (0–0)

Quarter	1	2	3	4	Total
No. 9 Mocs	0	0	3	0	3
No. 15 (FBS) Volunteers	24	21	10	14	69

at Neyland Stadium • Knoxville, Tennessee

- Date: Saturday, August 31, 2024
- Game time: 12:45 p.m.
- Game weather: Sunny, 87 °F (31 °C)
- Game attendance: 101,915
- Referee: Jason Autrey
- TV announcers (SECN): Taylor Zarzour (play-by-play), Matt Stinchcomb (analyst), and Alyssa Lang (sideline)

Game information

First quarter

- (11:09) TENN – Dylan Sampson 1-yard run (Max Gilbert kick) (Drive: 11 plays, 65 yards, 3:43; Tennessee 7–0)
- (08:34) TENN – Ethan Davis 4-yard pass from Nico Iamaleava (Max Gilbert kick) (Drive: 4 plays, 35 yards, 1:03; Tennessee 14–0)
- (07:18) TENN – Dont'e Thornton Jr. 36-yard pass from Nico Iamaleava (Max Gilbert kick) (Drive: 2 plays, 59 yards, 0:26; Tennessee 21–0)
- (08:34) TENN – Max Gilbert 36-yard field goal (Drive: 8 plays, 72 yards, 2:28; Tennessee 24–0)

Second quarter

- (14:03) TENN – Dylan Sampson 3-yard run (Max Gilbert kick) (Drive: 6 plays, 78 yards, 1:59; Tennessee 31–0)
- (10:14) TENN – Dont'e Thornton Jr. 10-yard pass from Nico Iamaleava (Max Gilbert kick) (Drive: 9 plays, 79 yards, 1:55; Tennessee 38–0)
- (06:43) TENN – Dylan Sampson 5-yard run (Max Gilbert kick) (Drive: 2 plays, 61 yards, 0:16; Tennessee 45–0)

Third quarter

- (10:10) UTC – Jude Kelley 43-yard field goal (Drive: 9 plays, 50 yards, 4:50; Tennessee 45–3)
- (07:15) TENN – Max Gilbert 42-yard field goal (Drive: 9 plays, 45 yards, 2:54; Tennessee 48–3)
- (01:13) TENN – DeSean Bishop 3-yard run (Max Gilbert kick) (Drive: 6 plays, 63 yards, 1:33; Tennessee 55–3)

Fourth quarter

- (04:06) TENN – Khalifa Keith 1-yard run (Josh Turbyville kick) (Drive: 17 plays, 80 yards, 7:05; Tennessee 62–3)
- (01:07) TENN – Jordan Ross 13-yard punt return (Josh Turbyville kick) (Tennessee 69–3)

Statistics	UTC	TENN
First downs	10	36
Total yards	227	718
Rushes/yards	35/92	46/311
Passing yards	153	414
Passing: Comp–Att–Int	13–24–0	33–44–1
Turnovers	0	1
Time of possession	30:46	29:10

Team	Category	Player	Statistics
Chattanooga	Passing	Chase Artopoeus	12/23, 141 yards
Chattanooga	Rushing	Reggie Davis	20 carries, 59 yards
Chattanooga	Receiving	Sam Philips	5 receptions, 54 yards
Tennessee	Passing	Nico Iamaleava	22/28, 314 yards, 3 TD
Tennessee	Rushing	Dylan Sampson	12 carries, 124 yards, 3 TD
Tennessee	Receiving	Dont'e Thornton Jr.	3 receptions, 105 yards, 2 TD

=== at Georgia State (FBS) ===
Game Two – No. 11 Chattanooga Mocs (0–1) vs Georgia State Panthers (FBS) (0–1) – Game summary

Quarter	1	2	3	4	Total
No. 11 Mocs	7	0	7	7	21
Panthers (FBS)	3	7	7	7	24

at Center Parc Stadium, Atlanta, Georgia

- Date: Saturday September 7, 2024
- Game time: 7:00 p.m.
- Game weather: Sunny
- Referee: Bob Smith
- TV announcers (ESPN+): Matt Stewart (play-by-play), Sam Crenshaw (analyst), and Kevin Barnes (sideline)

Game information

First quarter

- (7:16) GAST – Liam Rickman 44-yard field goal (Drive: 7 plays, 25 yards, 3:07; Georgia State 3–0)
- (1:27) UTC – Dalton Restelli 1-yard pass from Chase Artopoeus, Jude Kelley kick (Drive: 11 plays, 75 yards, 5:49; Chattanooga 7–3)

Second quarter

- (12:31) GAST – Jordan Ford 19-yard pass from Christian Veilleux, Liam Rickman kick (Drive: 9 plays, 64 yards, 3:56; Georgia State 10–7)

Third quarter

- (10:56) UTC – Reggie Davis 2-yard run, Jude Kelley kick (Drive: 3 plays, 10 yards, 1:26; Chattanooga 14–10)
- (7:35) GAST – Ted Hurst 22-yard pass from Christian Veilleux, Liam Rickman kick (Drive: 7 plays, 75 yards, 3:21; Georgia State 17–14)

Fourth quarter

- (11:33) UTC – Sam Phillips 84-yard pass from Chase Artopoeus, Jude Kelley kick (Drive: 4 plays, 98 yards, 2:36; Chattanooga 21–17)
- (7:01) GAST – Freddie Brock 12-yard run, Liam Rickman kick (Drive: 9 plays, 59 yards, 4:32; Georgia State 24–21)

Statistics	UTC	GAST
First downs	13	22
Total yards	308	391
Rushing yards	76	153
Passing yards	232	238
Passing: Comp–Att–Int	13–23–2	26–38–0
Time of possession	26:23	33:37

Team	Category	Player	Statistics
Chattanooga	Passing	Chase Artopoeus	13/23, 232 yards, 2 TD, 2 INT
Chattanooga	Rushing	Reggie Davis	19 carries, 68 yards, TD
Chattanooga	Receiving	Sam Phillips	8 receptions, 195 yards, TD
Georgia State	Passing	Christian Veilleux	26/38, 238 yards, 2 TD
Georgia State	Rushing	Freddie Brock	14 carries, 73 yards, TD
Georgia State	Receiving	Ted Hurst	6 receptions, 83 yards, TD

=== No. 23 Mercer ===
Game Three – No. 23 Mercer Bears (2–0) at No. 14 Chattanooga Mocs (0–2) – Game summary

Quarter	1	2	3	4	Total
No. 23 Bears	0	0	0	0	0
No. 14 Mocs	0	0	0	0	0

at Finley Stadium • Chattanooga, TN

- Date: Saturday September 14, 2024
- Game time: 6:00 p.m.
- Game weather: 0 °F (−18 °C)
- TV announcers (ESPN+): Chris Goforth, Chris Barnett, Dave Keylon

Game information

First quarter
Second quarter
Third quarter
Fourth quarter

Statistics	MER	UTC
First downs		
Total yards		
Rushing yards		
Passing yards		
Passing: Comp–Att–Int		
Time of possession		

Team	Category	Player	Statistics
Mercer	Passing		
Mercer	Rushing		
Mercer	Receiving		
Chattanooga	Passing		
Chattanooga	Rushing		
Chattanooga	Receiving		

=== Portland State ===
Game Four – Portland State Vikings (0–3) at Chattanooga Mocs (0–3) – Game summary

Quarter	1	2	3	4	Total
Vikings	0	0	0	0	0
Mocs	0	0	0	0	0

at Finley Stadium • Chattanooga, TN

- Date: Saturday September 28, 2024
- Game time: 6:00 p.m.
- Game weather: 0 °F (−18 °C)
- TV announcers (ESPN+): Pete Yanity, Jared Singleton, Dave Friedman

Game information

First quarter
Second quarter
Third quarter
Fourth quarter

Statistics	PRST	UTC
First downs		
Total yards		
Rushing yards		
Passing yards		
Passing: Comp–Att–Int		
Time of possession		

Team	Category	Player	Statistics
Portland State	Passing		
Portland State	Rushing		
Portland State	Receiving		
Chattanooga	Passing		
Chattanooga	Rushing		
Chattanooga	Receiving		

=== at No. 23 East Tennessee State ===
Game Five – Chattanooga Mocs (1–3) vs No. 23 East Tennessee State Buccaneers (3–2) – Game summary

Quarter	1	2	3	4	Total
Mocs	0	3	7	7	17
No. 23 Buccaneers	0	0	3	7	10

at William B. Greene Jr. Stadium, Johnson City, TN

- Date: Saturday October 5, 2024
- Game time: 3:30 p.m.
- Game weather: Sunny • Temperature: 78 °F (26 °C) • Wind: N 4 mph
- Game attendance: 10,534
- Referee: Bruce Austin
- TV announcers (ESPN+): Keith Brake (play-by-play), Mark Hutsell (analyst)

Game information

First quarter
Second quarter

- (12:05) UTC - Jude Kelley 45-yard field goal (Drive: 6 plays, 31 yards, 1:38; Chattanooga 3-0)

Third quarter

- (7:00) ETSU - Ewan Johnson 24-yard field goal (Drive: 10 plays, 80 yards, 3:39; Tied 3-3)
- (5:01) UTC - Sam Phillips 38-yard pass from Chase Artopoeus, Jude Kelley kick (Drive: 4 plays, 82 yards, 1:53; Chattanooga 10-3)

Fourth quarter

- (6:33) ETSU - AJ Johnson 25-yard pass from Gino English, Ewan Johnson kick (Drive: 8 plays, 55 yards, 3:27; Tied 10-10)
- (0:43) UTC - Reggie Davis 1-yard run, Jude Kelley kick (Drive: 11 plays, 75 yards, 5:50; Chattanooga 17-10)

Statistics	UTC	ETSU
First downs	22	12
Total yards	397	225
Rushing yards	116	117
Passing yards	281	108
Passing: Comp–Att–Int	17-34-1	10-23-1
Time of possession	37:06	22:54

Team	Category	Player	Statistics
Chattanooga	Passing	Chase Artopoeus	17-34, 281 yards, TD, INT
Chattanooga	Rushing	Reggie Davis	24 carries, 103 yards, TD
Chattanooga	Receiving	Sam Phillips	6 receptions, 110 yards, TD
East Tennessee State	Passing	Gino English	3-8, 57 yards, TD, INT
East Tennessee State	Rushing	Devontae Houston	11 carries, 59 yards
East Tennessee State	Receiving	AJ Johnson	4 receptions, 70 yards, RD

=== at Furman ===
Game Six – No. 23 Chattanooga Mocs (2–3) vs Furman Paladins (1–3) – Game summary

Quarter	1	2	3	4	Total
No. 23 Mocs	0	0	0	0	0
Paladins	0	0	0	0	0

at Paladin Stadium, Greenville, SC

- Date: Saturday October 12, 2024
- Game time: 2:00 p.m.
- TV announcers (ESPN+): Brock Bowling, Cole Neely

Game information

First quarter
Second quarter
Third quarter
Fourth quarter

Statistics	UTC	FUR
First downs		
Total yards		
Rushing yards		
Passing yards		
Passing: Comp–Att–Int		
Time of possession		

Team	Category	Player	Statistics
Chattanooga	Passing		
Chattanooga	Rushing		
Chattanooga	Receiving		
Furman	Passing		
Furman	Rushing		
Furman	Receiving		

=== Wofford ===
Game Seven – Wofford Terriers (3–3) at No. 19 Chattanooga Mocs (3–3) – Game summary

Quarter	1	2	3	4	Total
Terriers	0	0	0	0	0
No. 19 Mocs	0	0	0	0	0

at Finley Stadium • Chattanooga, TN

- Date: Saturday October 19, 2024
- Game time: 1:30 p.m.
- Game weather: 0 °F (−18 °C)
- TV announcers (ESPN+): Chris Goforth, Chris Barnett, Dave Keylon

Game information

First quarter
Second quarter
Third quarter
Fourth quarter

Statistics	WOF	UTC
First downs		
Total yards		
Rushing yards		
Passing yards		
Passing: Comp–Att–Int		
Time of possession		

Team	Category	Player	Statistics
Wofford	Passing		
Wofford	Rushing		
Wofford	Receiving		
Chattanooga	Passing		
Chattanooga	Rushing		
Chattanooga	Receiving		

=== VMI ===
Game Eight – VMI Keydets (0–7) at No. 19 Chattanooga Mocs (4–3) – Game summary

Quarter	1	2	3	4	Total
Keydets	0	0	0	0	0
No. 19 Mocs	0	0	0	0	0

at Finley Stadium • Chattanooga, TN

- Date: Saturday October 26, 2024
- Game time: 4:00 p.m.
- Game weather: 0 °F (−18 °C)
- TV announcers (ESPN+): Chris Goforth, Chris Barnett, Dave Keylon

Game information

First quarter
Second quarter
Third quarter
Fourth quarter

Statistics	VMI	UTC
First downs		
Total yards		
Rushing yards		
Passing yards		
Passing: Comp–Att–Int		
Time of possession		

Team	Category	Player	Statistics
VMI	Passing		
VMI	Rushing		
VMI	Receiving		
Chattanooga	Passing		
Chattanooga	Rushing		
Chattanooga	Receiving		

=== at Western Carolina ===
Game Nine – No. 18 Chattanooga Mocs (5–3) vs Western Carolina Catamounts (4–4) – Game summary

Quarter	1	2	3	4	Total
No. 18 Mocs	0	0	0	0	0
Catamounts	0	0	0	0	0

at Bob Waters Field at E. J. Whitmire Stadium, Cullowhee, NC

- Date: Saturday November 2, 2024
- Game time: 2:30 p.m.
- TV announcers (ESPN+): Pete Yanity, Daniel Hooker

Game information

First quarter
Second quarter
Third quarter
Fourth quarter

Statistics	UTC	WCU
First downs		
Total yards		
Rushing yards		
Passing yards		
Passing: Comp–Att–Int		
Time of possession		

Team	Category	Player	Statistics
Chattanooga	Passing		
Chattanooga	Rushing		
Chattanooga	Receiving		
Western Carolina	Passing		
Western Carolina	Rushing		
Western Carolina	Receiving		

=== at The Citadel ===
Game Ten – No. 23 Chattanooga Mocs (5–4) vs The Citadel Bulldogs (4–5) – Game summary

Quarter	1	2	3	4	Total
No. 23 Mocs	0	0	0	0	0
Bulldogs	0	0	0	0	0

at Johnson Hagood Stadium • Charleston, SC

- Date: Saturday November 9, 2024
- Game time: 2:00 p.m.
- TV announcers (ESPN+): Jason Kempf, Vad Lee, Madison Little

Game information

First quarter
Second quarter
Third quarter
Fourth quarter

Statistics	UTC	CIT
First downs		
Total yards		
Rushing yards		
Passing yards		
Passing: Comp–Att–Int		
Time of possession		

Team	Category	Player	Statistics
Chattanooga	Passing		
Chattanooga	Rushing		
Chattanooga	Receiving		
The Citadel	Passing		
The Citadel	Rushing		
The Citadel	Receiving		

=== Samford ===
Game Eleven – Samford Bulldogs (3–6) at No. 19 Chattanooga Mocs (6–4) – Game summary

Quarter	1	2	3	4	Total
Bulldogs	0	0	0	0	0
No. 19 Mocs	0	0	0	0	0

at Finley Stadium • Chattanooga, TN

- Date: Saturday November 16, 2024
- Game time: 1:30 p.m.
- Game weather: 0 °F (−18 °C)
- TV announcers (ESPN+): Chris Goforth, Chris Barnett, Dave Keylon

Game information

First quarter
Second quarter
Third quarter
Fourth quarter

Statistics	SAM	UTC
First downs		
Total yards		
Rushing yards		
Passing yards		
Passing: Comp–Att–Int		
Time of possession		

Team	Category	Player	Statistics
Samford	Passing		
Samford	Rushing		
Samford	Receiving		
Chattanooga	Passing		
Chattanooga	Rushing		
Chattanooga	Receiving		

=== at Austin Peay ===
Game Twelve – Chattanooga Mocs (6–5) vs Austin Peay Governors (4–7) – Game summary

Quarter	1	2	3	4	Total
Mocs	0	0	0	0	0
Governors	0	0	0	0	0

at Fortera Stadium • Clarksville, TN

- Date: Saturday November 23, 2024
- Game time: 1:00 PM CST
- Game weather: 0 °F (−18 °C)
- TV announcers (ESPN+): Ethan Schmidt, Colby Wilson

Game information

First quarter
Second quarter
Third quarter
Fourth quarter

Statistics	UTC	APSU
First downs		
Total yards		
Rushing yards		
Passing yards		
Passing: Comp–Att–Int		
Time of possession		

Team	Category	Player	Statistics
Chattanooga	Passing		
Chattanooga	Rushing		
Chattanooga	Receiving		
Austin Peay	Passing		
Austin Peay	Rushing		
Austin Peay	Receiving		
