= 2024 Samford Bulldogs football team =

American college football season

2024 Samford Bulldogs football
- Conference: Southern Conference
- Record: 4–7 (3–4 SoCon)
- Head coach: Chris Hatcher (10th season)
- Offensive coordinator: Ricky Turner (3rd season)
- Offensive scheme: Spread
- Defensive coordinator: Chris Boone (3rd season)
- Base defense: 4–3
- Home stadium: Pete Hanna Stadium

2024 Southern Conference football standings
	Conf.			Overall
Team	W		L	W		L
No. 8 Mercer $^	7	–	1	11	–	3
Western Carolina	6	–	2	7	–	5
Chattanooga	5	–	3	7	–	5
East Tennessee State	5	–	3	7	–	5
Samford	3	–	4	4	–	7
The Citadel	3	–	5	5	–	7
Wofford	3	–	5	5	–	7
Furman	2	–	5	3	–	8
VMI	1	–	7	1	–	11
$ – Conference champion; ^ – FCS playoff participant; Rankings from STATS Poll

The 2024 Samford Bulldogs football team represented Samford University as a member of the Southern Conference (SoCon) during the 2024 NCAA Division I FCS football season. The Bulldogs were coached by tenth-year head coach Chris Hatcher and played at Pete Hanna Stadium in Homewood, Alabama.

== Schedule ==
Date	Time	Opponent	Site	TV	Result	Attendance
August 31	5:00 p.m.	at West Georgia*	University Stadium; Carrollton, GA	ESPN+	L 21–38	4,329
September 7	6:00 p.m.	at Florida*	Ben Hill Griffin Stadium; Gainesville, FL	SECN+/ESPN+	L 7–45	89,295
September 14	6:00 p.m.	Alabama State*	Pete Hanna Stadium; Homewood, AL	ESPN+	W 12–7	6,045
September 28	2:00 p.m.	Furman	Paladin Stadium; Greenville, SC	ESPN+	Cancelled (Note: This game was cancelled in anticipation of Hurricane Helene.)	
October 5	2:00 p.m.	VMI	Pete Hanna Stadium; Homewood, AL	ESPN+	W 27–3	3,617
October 12	2:30 p.m.	at East Tennessee State	William B. Greene Jr. Stadium; Johnson City, TN	ESPN+	L 28–31	8,013
October 19	2:00 p.m.	No. 7 Mercer	Pete Hanna Stadium; Homewood, AL	ESPN+	W 55–35	4,216
October 26	1:00 p.m.	at The Citadel	Johnson Hagood Stadium; Charleston, SC	ESPN+	L 11–28	8,977
November 2	2:00 p.m.	Wofford	Pete Hanna Stadium; Homewood, AL	ESPN+	L 13–17	4,071
November 9	2:00 p.m.	Tennessee Tech*	Pete Hanna Stadium; Homewood, AL	ESPN+	L 7–27	3,013
November 16	12:30 p.m.	at No. 19 Chattanooga	Finley Stadium; Chattanooga, TN	ESPN+	W 36–13	7,691
November 23	2:00 p.m.	Western Carolina	Pete Hanna Stadium; Homewood, AL	ESPN+	L 42–47	4,723
*Non-conference game; Rankings from STATS Poll released prior to the game; All times are in Central time

== Game summaries ==
=== at West Georgia ===
Game One – Samford Bulldogs (0-0) at West Georgia Wolves (0-0) – Game summary

Quarter	1	2	3	4	Total
Bulldogs	7	7	15	0	29
Wolves	14	12	0	12	38

at University Stadium • Carrollton, GA

- Date: August 31
- Game time: 6:00 p.m.
- Game weather: Wind: S at 4 miles per hour (6.4 km/h) • Weather: Cloudy • Temp: 88 °F (31 °C)
- Game attendance: 4,329
- Referee: Gabriel Maddox
- TV announcers (ESPN+): Logan Maddox and Parker Gore

Game information

First quarter

- (13:49) UWG – Chase Belcher 3-yard run (Chance Gagnon kick) (Drive: 3 plays, 75 yards, 1:11; UWG 7-0)
- (11:04) SAM – Quincy Crittendon 1-yard run (Forrest Taylor kick) (Drive: 8 plays, 70 yards, 2:38; Tie 7-7)
- (4:41) UWG – Bryce Dickerson 29-yard pass from Davin Wydner (Chance Gagnon kick) (Drive: 13 plays, 75 yards, 6:23; UWG 14-7)

Second quarter

- (13:08) UWG – Chance Gagnon 49-yard field goal (Drive: 9 plays, 29 yards, 4:25; UWG 17-7)
- (8:43) SAM – Damonta Witherspoon 3-yard pass from Quincy Crittendon (Forrest Taylor kick) (Drive: 10 plays, 70 yards, 4:18; UWG 17-14)
- (2:18) UWG – Chance Gagnon 28-yard field goal (Drive: 15 plays, 66 yards, 6:19; UWG 20-14)
- (0:00) UWG – Dylan Gary 44-yard pass from Davin Wydner (Chance Gagnon kick no good) (Drive: 5 plays, 75 yards, 0:49; UWG 26-14)

Third quarter

- (8:41) SAM – Quincy Crittendon 3-yard run (Forrest Taylor kick) (Drive: 19 plays, 71 yards, 6:14; UWG 26-21)
- (5:54) SAM – Brendan Jenkins 68-yard pass from Quincy Crittendon (E. Jai Mason rush) (Drive: 1 play, 68 yards, 0:13; SAM 29-26)

Fourth quarter

- (13:40) UWG – Chase Belcher 4-yard run (Chance Gagnon kick blocked) (Drive: 7 plays, 30 yards, 2:26; UWG 32-29)
- (8:18) UWG – Davin Wydner 21-yard run (Chance Gagnon kick no good) (Drive: 8 plays, 87 yards, 3:45; UWG 38-29)

Statistics	SAM	UWG
First downs	25	24
Total yards	465	456
Rushing yards	163	185
Passing yards	302	271
Passing: Comp–Att–Int	24-41-1	24-35
Time of possession	25:01	34:59

Team	Category	Player	Statistics
Samford	Passing	Quincy Crittendon	24/41, 302 yards, 2 TD, 1 INT
Samford	Rushing	Quincy Crittendon	19 carries, 95 yards, 2 TD
Samford	Receiving	Brendan Jenkins	4 receptions, 81 yards, 1 TD
West Georgia	Passing	Davin Wydner	24/35, 271 yards, 2 TD
West Georgia	Rushing	Rajaez Mosley	23 carries, 66 yards
West Georgia	Receiving	Karmello English	6 receptions, 108 yards

=== at Florida (FBS) ===
Game Two – Samford Bulldogs (0–1) at Florida Gators (FBS) (0–1) – Game summary

Quarter	1	2	3	4	Total
Bulldogs	0	0	7	0	7
Gators (FBS)	7	7	14	17	45

at Ben Hill Griffin Stadium • Gainesville, Florida

- Date: September 7
- Game time: 6:00 p.m. CST
- TV announcers (SECN+/ESPN+): Clay Matvick (play-by-play) and Steve Addazio (analyst)

Statistics	SAM	UF
First downs		
Total yards		
Rushing yards		
Passing yards		
Passing: Comp–Att–Int		
Time of possession		

Team	Category	Player	Statistics
Samford	Passing		
Samford	Rushing		
Samford	Receiving		
Florida	Passing		
Florida	Rushing		
Florida	Receiving		

=== Alabama State ===
Game Three – Alabama State Hornets (1–1) vs Samford Bulldogs (0–2) – Game summary

Quarter	1	2	3	4	Total
Hornets	7	0	0	0	7
Bulldogs	0	6	6	0	12

at Pete Hanna Stadium, Homewood, Alabama

- Date: Saturday September 14, 2024
- Game time: 6:00 PM
- TV announcers (ESPN+): Blake Gardner, Damian Mitchell, Lynden Blake

Game information

First quarter
Second quarter
Third quarter
Fourth quarter

Statistics	ASU	SAM
First downs		
Total yards		
Rushing yards		
Passing yards		
Passing: Comp–Att–Int		
Time of possession		

Team	Category	Player	Statistics
Alabama State	Passing		
Alabama State	Rushing		
Alabama State	Receiving		
Samford	Passing		
Samford	Rushing		
Samford	Receiving		

=== at Furman ===
Game Four – Samford Bulldogs (1–2) vs Furman Paladins (1–3) – Game summary

Quarter	1	2	3	4	Total
Bulldogs	0	0	0	0	0
Paladins	0	0	0	0	0

at Paladin Stadium, Greenville, South Carolina

- Date: Saturday September 28, 2024
- Game time: 1:00 PM
- TV announcers (ESPN+): Brock Bowling, Cole Neely

Game information

First quarter
Second quarter
Third quarter
Fourth quarter

Statistics	SAM	FUR
First downs		
Total yards		
Rushing yards		
Passing yards		
Passing: Comp–Att–Int		
Time of possession		

Team	Category	Player	Statistics
Samford	Passing		
Samford	Rushing		
Samford	Receiving		
Furman	Passing		
Furman	Rushing		
Furman	Receiving		

=== VMI ===
Game Five – VMI Keydets (0–4) vs Samford Bulldogs (1–2) – Game summary

Quarter	1	2	3	4	Total
Keydets	3	0	0	0	3
Bulldogs	7	10	7	3	27

at Pete Hanna Stadium, Homewood, Alabama

- Date: Saturday October 5, 2024
- Game time: 2:00 PM
- TV announcers (ESPN+): Blake Gardner, Damian Mitchell, Justin Stuckey

Game information

First quarter
Second quarter
Third quarter
Fourth quarter

Statistics	VMI	SAM
First downs		
Total yards		
Rushing yards		
Passing yards		
Passing: Comp–Att–Int		
Time of possession		

Team	Category	Player	Statistics
VMI	Passing		
VMI	Rushing		
VMI	Receiving		
Samford	Passing		
Samford	Rushing		
Samford	Receiving		

=== at East Tennessee State ===
Game Six – Samford Bulldogs (2–2) vs East Tennessee State Buccaneers (3–3) – Game summary

Quarter	1	2	3	4	Total
Bulldogs	14	7	7	0	28
Buccaneers	7	7	7	10	31

at William B. Greene Jr. Stadium, Johnson City, TN

- Date: Saturday October 12, 2024
- Game time: 2:30 p.m.
- Game weather: Sunny • Temperature: 72 °F (22 °C) • Wind: SE 4 mph
- Game attendance: 8,013
- Referee: Michael Farmer
- TV announcers (ESPN+): Keith Brake (play-by-play), Mark Hutsell (analyst)

Game information

First quarter

- (10:11) SAM - Rayf Vinson 89-yard pass from Quincy Crittendon, Taylor Forrest kick (Drive: 3 plays, 95 yards, 0:51; Samford 7-0)
- (3:17) ETSU - Hakeem Meggett 31-yard pass from Jaylen King, Ewan Johnson kick (Drive: 6 plays, 52 yards, 2:22; Tied 7-7)
- (1:32) SAM - E. Jai Mason 41-yard pass from Quincy Crittendon, Taylor Forrest kick (Drive: 5 plays, 70 yards, 1:39; Samford 14-7)

Second quarter

- (12:55) SAM - Wesley Carlock 23-yard pass from Quincy Crittendon, Taylor Forrest kick (Drive: 7 plays, 61 yards, 2:38; Samford 21-7)
- (2:18) ETSU - AJ Johnson 15-yard pass from Jaylen King, Ewan Johnson kick (Drive: 3 plays, 60 yards, 0:43; Samford 21-14)

Third quarter

- (10:35) SAM - E. Jai Mason 7-yard pass from Quincy Crittendon, Taylor Forrest kick (Drive: 3 plays, 32 yards, 0:58; Samford 28-14)
- (6:54) ETSU - AJ Johnson 75-yard pass from Jaylen King, Ewan Johnson kick (Drive: 2 plays, 92 yards, 0:36; Samford 28-21)

Fourth quarter

- (14:13) ETSU - Ewan Johnson 23-yard field goal (Drive: 13 plays, 47 yards, 6:21; Samford 28-24)
- (1:46) ETSU - Gino English 1-yard run (Drive: 5 plays, 33 yards, 2:10; East Tennessee State 31-28)

Statistics	SAM	ETSU
First downs	14	21
Total yards	319	455
Rushing yards	13	151
Passing yards	306	304
Passing: Comp–Att–Int	27-37-0	16-29-3
Time of possession	26:21	33:39

Team	Category	Player	Statistics
Samford	Passing	Quincy Crittendon	27-36, 306 yards, 4 TD
Samford	Rushing	Damonta Whiterspoon	8 carries, 29 yards
Samford	Receiving	Rayf Vinson	2 receptions, 93 yards, TD
East Tennessee State	Passing	Jaylen King	15-27, 268 yards, 3 TD, 3 INT
East Tennessee State	Rushing	Jaylen King	19 carries, 80 yards
East Tennessee State	Receiving	AJ Johnson	7 receptions, 146 yards, 2 TD

=== No. 7 Mercer ===
Game Seven – No. 7 Mercer Bears (6–0) at Samford Bulldogs (2–3) – Game summary

Quarter	1	2	3	4	Total
No. 7 Bears	0	0	0	0	0
Bulldogs	0	0	0	0	0

at Pete Hanna Stadium, Homewood, AL

- Date: Saturday October 19, 2024
- Game time: 3:30 p.m.
- TV announcers (ESPN+): Blake Gardner, Damian Mitchell, Justin Stuckey

Game information

First quarter
Second quarter
Third quarter
Fourth quarter

Statistics	MER	SAM
First downs		
Total yards		
Rushing yards		
Passing yards		
Passing: Comp–Att–Int		
Time of possession		

Team	Category	Player	Statistics
Mercer	Passing		
Mercer	Rushing		
Mercer	Receiving		
Samford	Passing		
Samford	Rushing		
Samford	Receiving		

=== at The Citadel ===
Game Eight – Samford Bulldogs (3–3) vs The Citadel Bulldogs (3–5) – Game summary

Quarter	1	2	3	4	Total
Samford	0	0	0	0	0
The Citadel	0	0	0	0	0

at Johnson Hagood Stadium • Charleston, SC

- Date: Saturday October 26, 2024
- Game time: 1:00 p.m. CST
- TV announcers (ESPN+): Dave Weinstein, Vad Lee, Madison Little

Game information

First quarter
Second quarter
Third quarter
Fourth quarter

Statistics	SAM	CIT
First downs		
Total yards		
Rushing yards		
Passing yards		
Passing: Comp–Att–Int		
Time of possession		

Team	Category	Player	Statistics
Samford	Passing		
Samford	Rushing		
Samford	Receiving		
The Citadel	Passing		
The Citadel	Rushing		
The Citadel	Receiving		

=== Wofford ===
Game Nine – Wofford Terriers (3–5) at Samford Bulldogs (3–4) – Game summary

Quarter	1	2	3	4	Total
Terriers	0	0	0	0	0
Bulldogs	0	0	0	0	0

at Pete Hanna Stadium • Homewood, AL

- Date: Saturday November 2, 2024
- Game time: 2:00 p.m. CST
- Game weather: 0 °F (−18 °C)
- TV announcers (ESPN+): Blake Gardner, Damian Mitchell, Lynden Blake

Game information

First quarter
Second quarter
Third quarter
Fourth quarter

Statistics	WOF	SAM
First downs		
Total yards		
Rushing yards		
Passing yards		
Passing: Comp–Att–Int		
Time of possession		

Team	Category	Player	Statistics
Wofford	Passing		
Wofford	Rushing		
Wofford	Receiving		
Samford	Passing		
Samford	Rushing		
Samford	Receiving		

=== Tennessee Tech ===
Game Ten – Tennessee Tech Golden Eagles (4–5) at Samford Bulldogs (3–5) – Game summary

Quarter	1	2	3	4	Total
Golden Eagles	0	0	20	7	27
Bulldogs	0	0	0	7	7

at Pete Hanna Stadium • Homewood, AL

- Date: Saturday November 9, 2024
- Game time: 2:00 p.m. CST
- Game weather: Rain, 78 °F (26 °C)
- Game attendance: 3,013
- Referee: Jake Grombach
- TV announcers (ESPN+): Eli Gold, Damian Mitchell, Lynden Blake

Game information

First quarter
Second quarter
Third quarter
Fourth quarter

Statistics	TNTC	SAM
First downs	15	8
Total yards	283	184
Rushing yards	160	19
Passing yards	123	165
Passing: Comp–Att–Int	13–26–0	22–33–1
Time of possession	33:09	26:51

Team	Category	Player	Statistics
Tennessee Tech	Passing	Dylan Laible	13/26, 123 yds
Tennessee Tech	Rushing	Tremel Jones	1 carry, 79 yards, 1 TD
Tennessee Tech	Receiving	Tremel Jones	2 receptions, 37 yards
Samford	Passing	Quincy Crittendon	22/32, 165 yds, 1 TD, 1 INT
Samford	Rushing	Damonta Witherspoon	7 carries, 17 yards
Samford	Receiving	D.J. Rias	4 receptions, 78 yards, 1 TD

=== at No. 19 Chattanooga ===
Game Eleven – Samford Bulldogs (3–6) at No. 19 Chattanooga Mocs (6–4) – Game summary

Quarter	1	2	3	4	Total
Bulldogs	0	0	0	0	0
No. 19 Mocs	0	0	0	0	0

at Finley Stadium • Chattanooga, TN

- Date: Saturday November 16, 2024
- Game time: 12:30 p.m. CST
- Game weather: 0 °F (−18 °C)
- TV announcers (ESPN+): Chris Goforth, Chris Barnett, Dave Keylon

Game information

First quarter
Second quarter
Third quarter
Fourth quarter

Statistics	SAM	UTC
First downs		
Total yards		
Rushing yards		
Passing yards		
Passing: Comp–Att–Int		
Time of possession		

Team	Category	Player	Statistics
Samford	Passing		
Samford	Rushing		
Samford	Receiving		
Chattanooga	Passing		
Chattanooga	Rushing		
Chattanooga	Receiving		

=== Western Carolina ===
Game Twelve – Western Carolina Catamounts (6–5) at Samford Bulldogs (4–6) – Game summary

Quarter	1	2	3	4	Total
Catamounts	0	0	0	0	0
Bulldots	0	0	0	0	0

at Pete Hanna Stadium • Homewood, AL

- Date: Saturday November 23, 2024
- Game time: 2:00 p.m. CST
- Game weather: 0 °F (−18 °C)
- TV announcers (ESPN+): Blake Gardner, Damian Mitchell, Christina Chambers

Game information

First quarter
Second quarter
Third quarter
Fourth quarter

Statistics	WCU	SAM
First downs		
Total yards		
Rushing yards		
Passing yards		
Passing: Comp–Att–Int		
Time of possession		

Team	Category	Player	Statistics
Western Carolina	Passing		
Western Carolina	Rushing		
Western Carolina	Receiving		
Samford	Passing		
Samford	Rushing		
Samford	Receiving		
