= 2024 Wofford Terriers football team =

American college football season

2024 Wofford Terriers football
- Conference: Southern Conference
- Record: 5–7 (3–5 SoCon)
- Head coach: Shawn Watson (2nd season)
- Co-defensive coordinators: Andrew Warwick (3rd season); Jonathan Saxon (2nd season)
- Home stadium: Gibbs Stadium

2024 Southern Conference football standings
	Conf.			Overall
Team	W		L	W		L
No. 8 Mercer $^	7	–	1	11	–	3
Western Carolina	6	–	2	7	–	5
Chattanooga	5	–	3	7	–	5
East Tennessee State	5	–	3	7	–	5
Samford	3	–	4	4	–	7
The Citadel	3	–	5	5	–	7
Wofford	3	–	5	5	–	7
Furman	2	–	5	3	–	8
VMI	1	–	7	1	–	11
$ – Conference champion; ^ – FCS playoff participant; Rankings from STATS Poll

The 2024 Wofford Terriers football team represented Wofford College as a member of the Southern Conference (SoCon) during the 2024 NCAA Division I FCS football season. The Terriers were coached by second-year head coach Shawn Watson and played at Gibbs Stadium in Spartanburg, South Carolina.

== Schedule ==
Date	Time	Opponent	Rank	Site	TV	Result	Attendance
August 29	7:00 p.m.	at Gardner–Webb*		Ernest W. Spangler Stadium; Boiling Springs, NC	ESPN+	W 21–20	4,378
September 7	3:30 p.m.	at No. 14 Richmond*		E. Claiborne Robins Stadium; Richmond, VA	FloSports	W 26–19	5,382
September 14	6:00 p.m.	No. 13 William & Mary*		Gibbs Stadium; Spartanburg, SC	ESPN+	L 21–28	4,039
September 28	1:30 p.m.	No. 12 Mercer	No. 23	Gibbs Stadium; Spartanburg, SC	ESPN+	L 3–22	1,219
October 5	2:30 p.m.	at Western Carolina		Bob Waters Field at E. J. Whitmire Stadium; Cullowhee, NC	ESPN+	L 17–21	Behind closed doors
October 12	1:30 p.m.	VMI		Gibbs Stadium; Spartanburg, SC	ESPN+	W 31–16	4,248
October 19	1:30 p.m.	at No. 19 Chattanooga		Finley Stadium; Chattanooga, TN	ESPN+	L 5–37	7,260
October 26	2:00 p.m.	No. 23 East Tennessee State^{†}		Gibbs Stadium; Spartanburg, SC	ESPN+	L 7–24	4,548
November 2	3:00 p.m.	at Samford		Pete Hanna Stadium; Homewood, AL	ESPN+	W 17–13	4,071
November 9	2:00 p.m.	at Furman		Paladin Stadium; Greenville, SC (rivalry)	ESPN+	W 19–13	8,327
November 16	1:30 p.m.	The Citadel		Gibbs Stadium; Spartanburg, SC (rivalry)	ESPN+	L 17–30	4,561
November 23	4:00 p.m.	at No. 18 (FBS) South Carolina*		Williams–Brice Stadium; Columbia, SC	SECN+/ESPN+	L 12–56	79,078
*Non-conference game; ^{†}Homecoming; Rankings from STATS Poll released prior to the game; All times are in Eastern time

== Game summaries ==
=== at Gardner-Webb ===
Game One – Wofford Terriers (0–0) at Gardner-Webb Runnin' Bulldogs (0–0) – Game summary

Quarter	1	2	3	4	Total
Terriers	0	0	0	0	0
Runnin' Bulldogs	0	0	0	0	0

at Ernest W. Spangler Stadium • Boiling Springs, NC

- Date: Thursday August 29, 2024
- Game time: 7:00 p.m.
- Game weather: 0 °F (−18 °C)
- TV announcers (FloSports): TBD

Game information

First quarter
Second quarter
Third quarter
Fourth quarter

Statistics	WOF	GWEB
First downs		
Total yards		
Rushing yards		
Passing yards		
Passing: Comp–Att–Int		
Time of possession		

Team	Category	Player	Statistics
Wofford	Passing		
Wofford	Rushing		
Wofford	Receiving		
Gardner–Webb	Passing		
Gardner–Webb	Rushing		
Gardner–Webb	Receiving		

=== at No. 14 Richmond ===
Game Two – Wofford Terriers (1–0) at No. 14 Richmond Spiders (0–1) – Game summary

Quarter	1	2	3	4	Total
Terriers	0	10	6	10	26
No. 14 Spiders	2	10	0	7	19

at E. Claiborne Robins Stadium • Richmond, VA

- Date: Saturday September 7, 2024
- Game time: 3:30 p.m.
- Game weather: Cloudy • Temperature: 77 °F (25 °C) • Wind: W 5 mph
- Game attendance: 5,382
- TV announcers (FloSports): TBD

Game information

First quarter
Second quarter
Third quarter
Fourth quarter

Statistics	WOF	RICH
First downs	15	11
Total yards	304	318
Rushing yards	71	189
Passing yards	233	129
Passing: Comp–Att–Int	17–30–0	15–34–4
Time of possession	27:32	32:28

Team	Category	Player	Statistics
Wofford	Passing	Amari Odom	16–28, 219 yards, 2 TD
Wofford	Rushing	Ryan Ingram	11 carries, 36 yards, TD
Wofford	Receiving	Kyle Watkins	7 receptions, 133 yards
Richmond	Passing	Kyle Wickersham	11–25, 97 yards
Richmond	Rushing	Kyle Wickersham	15 carries, 100 yards
Richmond	Receiving	Matt Robbert	3 receptions, 41 yards

=== No. 13 William & Mary ===
Game Three – No. 13 William & Mary Tribe (1–1) at Wofford Terriers (2–0) – Game summary

Quarter	1	2	3	4	Total
No. 13 Tribe	7	7	7	7	28
Terriers	0	14	0	7	21

at Gibbs Stadium • Spartanburg, SC

- Date: Saturday September 14, 2024
- Game time: 6:00 p.m.
- Game weather: 0 °F (−18 °C)
- TV announcers (ESPN+): TBD

Game information

First quarter
Second quarter
Third quarter
Fourth quarter

Statistics	W&M	WOF
First downs		
Total yards		
Rushing yards		
Passing yards		
Passing: Comp–Att–Int		
Time of possession		

Team	Category	Player	Statistics
William & Mary	Passing		
William & Mary	Rushing		
William & Mary	Receiving		
Wofford	Passing		
Wofford	Rushing		
Wofford	Receiving		

=== No. 12 Mercer ===
Game Four – No. 12 Mercer Bears (4–0) at No. 23 Wofford Terriers (2–1) – Game summary

Quarter	1	2	3	4	Total
No. 12 Bears	0	0	0	0	0
No. 23 Terriers	0	0	0	0	0

at Gibbs Stadium • Spartanburg, SC

- Date: Saturday September 28, 2024
- Game time: 1:30 p.m.
- Game weather: 0 °F (−18 °C)
- TV announcers (ESPN+): TBD

Game information

First quarter
Second quarter
Third quarter
Fourth quarter

Statistics	MER	WOF
First downs		
Total yards		
Rushing yards		
Passing yards		
Passing: Comp–Att–Int		
Time of possession		

Team	Category	Player	Statistics
Mercer	Passing		
Mercer	Rushing		
Mercer	Receiving		
Wofford	Passing		
Wofford	Rushing		
Wofford	Receiving		

=== at Western Carolina ===
Game Five – Wofford Terriers (2–2) at Western Carolina Catamounts (1–3) – Game summary

Quarter	1	2	3	4	Total
Terriers	0	0	0	0	0
Catamounts	0	0	0	0	0

at Bob Waters Field at E. J. Whitmire Stadium • Cullowhee, NC

- Date: Saturday October 5, 2024
- Game time: 2:30 p.m.
- Game weather: 0 °F (−18 °C)
- TV announcers (ESPN+): TBD

Game information

First quarter
Second quarter
Third quarter
Fourth quarter

Statistics	WOF	WCU
First downs		
Total yards		
Rushing yards		
Passing yards		
Passing: Comp–Att–Int		
Time of possession		

Team	Category	Player	Statistics
Wofford	Passing		
Wofford	Rushing		
Wofford	Receiving		
Western Carolina	Passing		
Western Carolina	Rushing		
Western Carolina	Receiving		

=== VMI ===
Game Six – VMI Keydets (0–5) vs Wofford Terriers (2–3) – Game summary

Quarter	1	2	3	4	Total
Keydets	0	0	0	0	0
Terriers	0	0	0	0	0

at Gibbs Stadium • Spartanburg, SC

- Date: Saturday October 12, 2024
- Game time: 1:30 PM
- TV: ESPN+

Game information

First quarter
Second quarter
Third quarter
Fourth quarter

Statistics	VMI	WOF
First downs		
Total yards		
Rushing yards		
Passing yards		
Passing: Comp–Att–Int		
Time of possession		

Team	Category	Player	Statistics
VMI	Passing		
VMI	Rushing		
VMI	Receiving		
Wofford	Passing		
Wofford	Rushing		
Wofford	Receiving		

=== at No. 19 Chattanooga ===
Game Seven – Wofford Terriers (3–3) at No. 19 Chattanooga Mocs (3–3) – Game summary

Quarter	1	2	3	4	Total
Terriers	0	0	0	0	0
No. 19 Mocs	0	0	0	0	0

at Finley Stadium • Chattanooga, TN

- Date: Saturday October 19, 2024
- Game time: 1:30 p.m.
- Game weather: 0 °F (−18 °C)
- TV: ESPN+

Game information

First quarter
Second quarter
Third quarter
Fourth quarter

Statistics	WOF	UTC
First downs		
Total yards		
Rushing yards		
Passing yards		
Passing: Comp–Att–Int		
Time of possession		

Team	Category	Player	Statistics
Wofford	Passing		
Wofford	Rushing		
Wofford	Receiving		
Chattanooga	Passing		
Chattanooga	Rushing		
Chattanooga	Receiving		

=== No. 23 East Tennessee State ===
Game Eight – No. 23 East Tennessee State Buccaneers (4–3) vs Wofford Terriers (3–4) – Game summary

Quarter	1	2	3	4	Total
No. 23 Buccaneers	0	3	14	7	24
Terriers	0	0	7	0	7

at Gibbs Stadium • Spartanburg, SC

- Date: Saturday October 26, 2024
- Game time: 2:00 p.m.
- Game weather: Cloudy • Temperature: 81 °F (27 °C) • Wind: E 2 mph
- Game attendance: 4,548
- Referee: Jason Graham
- TV announcers (ESPN+): Jim Noble (play-by-play), Thom Henson (analyst), and Van Hipp (sideline reporter)

Game information

First quarter
Second quarter

- (1:59) ETSU - Ewan Johnson 28-yard field goal (Drive: 13 plays, 69 yards, 5:55; East Tennessee State 3-0)

Third quarter

- (10:43) ETSU - Elijah Taylor 15-yard fumble recovery, Ewan Johnson kick (East Tennessee State 10-0)
- (7:09) WOF - Jordan Davis 29-yard pass from Bryce Corriston, Devery Cagle kick (Drive: 7 plays, 75 yards, 3:34; East Tennessee State 10-7)
- (3:38) ETSU - Jaylen King 22-yard run, Ewan Johnson kick (Drive: 9 plays, 74 yards, 3:25; East Tennessee State 17-7)

Fourth quarter

- (13:08) ETSU - Jaylen King 31-yard run, Ewan Johnson kick (Drive: 8 plays, 60 yards, 3:34; East Tennessee State 24-7)

Statistics	ETSU	WOF
First downs	22	9
Total yards	407	178
Rushing yards	209	75
Passing yards	198	103
Passing: Comp–Att–Int	18-33-2	8-19-0
Time of possession	34:06	25:54

Team	Category	Player	Statistics
East Tennessee State	Passing	Jaylen King	18-32, 198 yards, 2 INT
East Tennessee State	Rushing	Jaylen King	12 carries, 88 yards, 2 TD
East Tennessee State	Receiving	Karim Page	5 receptions, 88 yards
Wofford	Passing	Bryce Corriston	8-19, 103 yards, TD
Wofford	Rushing	Ryan Ingram	10 carries, 36 yards
Wofford	Receiving	Kyle Watkins	3 receptions, 44 yards

=== at Samford ===
Game Nine – Wofford Terriers (3–5) at Samford Bulldogs (3–4) – Game summary

Quarter	1	2	3	4	Total
Terriers	0	0	0	0	0
Bulldogs	0	0	0	0	0

at Pete Hanna Stadium • Homewood, AL

- Date: Saturday November 2, 2024
- Game time: 3:00 p.m.
- Game weather: 0 °F (−18 °C)
- TV: ESPN+

Game information

First quarter
Second quarter
Third quarter
Fourth quarter

Statistics	WOF	SAM
First downs		
Total yards		
Rushing yards		
Passing yards		
Passing: Comp–Att–Int		
Time of possession		

Team	Category	Player	Statistics
Wofford	Passing		
Wofford	Rushing		
Wofford	Receiving		
Samford	Passing		
Samford	Rushing		
Samford	Receiving		

=== at Furman (rivalry) ===
Game Ten – Wofford Terriers (4–5) at Furman Paladins (2–6) – Game summary

Quarter	1	2	3	4	Total
Terriers	0	0	0	0	0
Paladins	0	0	0	0	0

at Paladin Stadium • Greenville, SC

- Date: Saturday November 9, 2024
- Game time: 2:00 p.m.
- Game weather: 0 °F (−18 °C)
- TV: ESPN+

Game information

First quarter
Second quarter
Third quarter
Fourth quarter

Statistics	WOF	FUR
First downs		
Total yards		
Rushing yards		
Passing yards		
Passing: Comp–Att–Int		
Time of possession		

Team	Category	Player	Statistics
Wofford	Passing		
Wofford	Rushing		
Wofford	Receiving		
Furman	Passing		
Furman	Rushing		
Furman	Receiving		

=== The Citadel (rivalry) ===
Game Eleven – The Citadel Bulldogs (4–6) vs Wofford Terriers (5–5) – Game summary

Quarter	1	2	3	4	Total
Bulldogs	0	0	0	0	0
Terriers	0	0	0	0	0

at Gibbs Stadium • Spartanburg, SC

- Date: Saturday November 16, 2024
- Game time: 1:30 p.m.
- TV announcers (ESPN+): TBD

Game information

First quarter
Second quarter
Third quarter
Fourth quarter

Statistics	CIT	WOF
First downs		
Total yards		
Rushing yards		
Passing yards		
Passing: Comp–Att–Int		
Time of possession		

Team	Category	Player	Statistics
The Citadel	Passing		
The Citadel	Rushing		
The Citadel	Receiving		
Wofford	Passing		
Wofford	Rushing		
Wofford	Receiving		

=== at No. 18 (FBS) South Carolina ===
Game Twelve – Wofford Terriers (5–6) at No. 18 (FBS) South Carolina Gamecocks (7–3) – Game summary

Quarter	1	2	3	4	Total
Terriers	3	6	0	3	12
No. 18 (FBS) Gamecocks	7	14	14	21	56

at Williams–Brice Stadium • Columbia, SC

- Date: Saturday November 23, 2024
- Game time: 4:00 p.m.
- Game weather: Sunny • Temperature: 60 °F (16 °C) • Wind: W 6 mph
- Game attendance: 79,078
- Referee: Ken Williamson
- TV announcers (SECN+/ESPN+): Jay Alter (play-by-play), Rocky Boiman (analyst), and Ashley Stroehlein (sideline)

Game information

First quarter

- (12:34) WOFF – Devery Cagle 27-yard field goal (Drive: 5 plays, 66 yards, 2:26; Wofford 3–0)
- (1:48) SCAR – Raheim Sanders 11-yard run, Alex Herrera kick (Drive: 17 plays, 90 yards, 8:47; South Carolina 7–3)

Second quarter

- (12:02) SCAR – LaNorris Sellers 1-yard run, Alex Herrera kick (Drive: 5 plays, 71 yards, 2:12; South Carolina 14–3)
- (1:48) WOFF – Dylan Djete 6-yard pass from Amari Odom, 2-PT failed (Drive: 10 plays, 57 yards, 5:06; South Carolina 14–9)
- (0:20) SCAR – Maurice Brown II 1-yard pass from LaNorris Sellers, Alex Herrera kick (Drive: 8 plays, 68 yards, 1:21; South Carolina 21–9)

Third quarter

- (11:31) SCAR – Nyck Harbor 26-yard pass from LaNorris Sellers, Alex Herrera kick (Drive: 9 plays, 82 yards, 3:23; South Carolina 28–9)
- (3:00) SCAR – Gage Larvadain 13-yard pass from LaNorris Sellers, Alex Herrera kick (Drive: 11 plays, 70 yards, 5:23; South Carolina 35–9)

Fourth quarter

- (13:29) WOFF – Devery Cagle 28-yard field goal (Drive: 8 plays, 34 yards, 3:22; South Carolina 35–12)
- (10:27) SCAR – Robby Ashford 5-yard run, Alex Herrera kick (Drive: 7 plays, 70 yards, 2:48; South Carolina 42–12)
- (7:04) SCAR – Jawarn Howell 27-yard run, Alex Herrera kick (Drive: 5 plays, 70 yards, 1:32; South Carolina 49–12)
- (0:09) SCAR – Bradley Dunn 5-yard run, Alex Herrera kick (Drive: 10 plays, 85 yards, 3:59; South Carolina 56–12)

Statistics	WOF	SCAR
First downs	14	34
Total yards	247	608
Rushing yards	28	265
Passing yards	219	343
Passing: Comp–Att–Int	17–31–0	27–32–1
Time of possession	28:00	32:00

Team	Category	Player	Statistics
Wofford	Passing	Amari Odom	15/28, 215 yards, TD
Wofford	Rushing	Ryan Ingram	14 carries, 25 yards
Wofford	Receiving	Kyle Watkins	6 receptions, 133 yards
South Carolina	Passing	LaNorris Sellers	23/27, 307 yards, 3 TD, INT
South Carolina	Rushing	Raheim Sanders	15 carries, 72 yards, TD
South Carolina	Receiving	Dalevon Campbell	5 receptions, 120 yards
