= 2024 Furman Paladins football team =

American college football season

2024 Furman Paladins football
- Conference: Southern Conference
- Record: 3–8 (2–5 SoCon)
- Head coach: Clay Hendrix (8th season)
- Offensive coordinator: Justin Roper (3rd season)
- Defensive coordinator: Duane Vaughn (6th season)
- Co-defensive coordinator: Chad Byers (3rd season)
- Home stadium: Paladin Stadium

2024 Southern Conference football standings
	Conf.			Overall
Team	W		L	W		L
No. 8 Mercer $^	7	–	1	11	–	3
Western Carolina	6	–	2	7	–	5
Chattanooga	5	–	3	7	–	5
East Tennessee State	5	–	3	7	–	5
Samford	3	–	4	4	–	7
The Citadel	3	–	5	5	–	7
Wofford	3	–	5	5	–	7
Furman	2	–	5	3	–	8
VMI	1	–	7	1	–	11
$ – Conference champion; ^ – FCS playoff participant; Rankings from STATS Poll

The 2024 Furman Paladins football team represented Furman University as a member of the Southern Conference (SoCon) during the 2024 NCAA Division I FCS football season. The Paladins were coached by eighth-year head coach Clay Hendrix and played at Paladin Stadium in Greenville, South Carolina.

== Schedule ==
Date	Time	Opponent	Rank	Site	TV	Result	Attendance
August 31	7:00 p.m.	at No. 6 (FBS) Ole Miss*	No. 12	Vaught–Hemingway Stadium; Oxford, MS	SECN+/ESPN+	L 0–76	66,105
September 7	6:00 p.m.	Charleston Southern*	No. 15	Paladin Stadium; Greenville, SC	ESPN+	L 20–24	8,377
September 14	2:00 p.m.	Stetson*		Paladin Stadium; Greenville, SC	ESPN+	W 48–7	7,917
September 21	6:00 p.m.	at No. 12 William & Mary*		Zable Stadium; Williamsburg, VA	FloSports	L 24–34	7,657
September 28	2:00 p.m.	Samford		Paladin Stadium; Greenville, SC	ESPN+	Cancelled (Note: This game was cancelled in anticipation of Hurricane Helene.)	
October 5	2:00 p.m.	at The Citadel		Johnson Hagood Stadium; Charleston, SC (rivalry)	ESPN+	W 17–16	9,053
October 12	2:00 p.m.	No. 23 Chattanooga		Paladin Stadium; Greenville, SC	ESPN+	L 10–41	6,927
October 19	2:00 p.m.	Western Carolina^{†}		Paladin Stadium; Greenville, SC	ESPN+	L 20–52	9,897
November 2	1:30 p.m.	at VMI		Alumni Memorial Field; Lexington, VA	ESPN+	L 17–21	4,012
November 9	2:00 p.m.	Wofford		Paladin Stadium; Greenville, SC (rivalry)	ESPN+	L 13–19	8,327
November 16	12:00 p.m.	at No. 21 East Tennessee State		William B. Greene Jr. Stadium; Johnson City, TN	ESPN+	W 24–21	8,436
November 23	3:00 p.m.	at No. 8 Mercer		Five Star Stadium; Macon, GA	ESPN+	L 23–49	8,453
*Non-conference game; ^{†}Homecoming; Rankings from STATS Poll released prior to the game; All times are in Eastern time

== Game summaries ==
=== at No. 6 (FBS) Ole Miss ===
Game One – No. 12 Furman Paladins (0–0) at No. 6 (FBS) Ole Miss Rebels (0–0) – Game summary

Quarter	1	2	3	4	Total
No. 12 Paladins	0	0	0	0	0
No. 6 (FBS) Rebels	24	28	21	3	76

at Vaught–Hemingway Stadium • Oxford, MS

- Date: Saturday, August 31, 2024
- Game time: 7:00 p.m. EST
- Game weather: Cloudy, 83 °F (28 °C)
- Game attendance: 66,105
- Referee: Lee Hedrick
- TV announcers (SECN+/ESPN+): Jay Alter (play-by-play), Rocky Boiman (analyst), and Ashley Stroehlein (sideline)

Game information
1st Quarter
- (11:53) Ole Miss - Jaxson Dart 15-yard run (Caden Davis kick) (Drive: 8 plays, 75 yards, 3:07; Ole Miss 7–0)
- (8:07) Ole Miss - Antwane Wells Jr. 61-yard pass from Jaxson Dart (Caden Davis kick) (Drive: 2 plays, 90 yards, 0:36; Ole Miss 14–0)
- (4:39) Ole Miss - JJ Pegues 2-yard run (Caden Davis kick) (Drive: 10 plays, 46 yards, 2:57; Ole Miss 21–0)
- (0:58) Ole Miss - Caden Davis 42-yard field goal (Drive: 5 plays, 20 yards, 1:26; Ole Miss 24–0)

2nd Quarter

- (11:27) Ole Miss - Dae'Quan Wright 4-yard pass from Jaxson Dart (Caden Davis kick) (Drive: 7 plays, 63 yards, 3:22; Ole Miss 31–0)
- (8:00) Ole Miss - Caden Prieskorn 46-yard pass from Jaxson Dart (Caden Davis kick) (Drive: 2 plays, 81 yards, 0:54; Ole Miss 38–0)
- (6:18) Ole Miss - Tre Harris 61-yard pass from Jaxson Dart (Caden Davis kick) (Drive: 1 play, 61 yards, 0:09; Ole Miss 45–0)
- (1:34) Ole Miss - Tre Harris 22-yard pass from Jaxson Dart (Caden Davis kick) (Drive: 7 plays, 58 yards, 2:16; Ole Miss 52–0)

3rd Quarter

- (12:49) Ole Miss - Cayden Lee 35-yard pass from Austin Simmons (Caden Davis kick) (Drive: 1 play, 35 yards, 0:07; Ole Miss 59–0)
- (4:46) Ole Miss - Matt Jones 17-yard run (Caden Davis kick) (Drive: 4 plays, 52 yards, 1:02; Ole Miss 66–0)
- (0:16) Ole Miss - Matt Jones 46-yard run (Caden Davis kick) (Drive: 8 plays, 73 yards, 2:55; Ole Miss 73–0)

4th Quarter

- (11:42) Ole Miss - Caden Davis 41-yard field goal (Drive: 9 plays, 55 yards, 2:33; Ole Miss 76–0)

Statistics	FUR	MISS
First downs	7	37
Total yards	62–172	82–772
Rushing yards	30–26	37–243
Passing yards	146	529
Passing: Comp–Att–Int	19–34–1	29–45–0
Time of possession	30:50	29:10

Team	Category	Player	Statistics
Furman	Passing	Carson Jones	15–25, 119 yards, 1 INT
Furman	Rushing	Myion Hicks	6 carries, 23 yards
Furman	Receiving	Joshua Harris	3 receptions, 59 yards
Ole Miss	Passing	Jaxson Dart	22–27, 418 yards, 5 TD
Ole Miss	Rushing	Matt Jones	3 carries, 68 yards, 2 TD
Ole Miss	Receiving	Tre Harris	8 receptions, 179 yards, 2 TD

=== Charleston Southern ===
Game Two – Charleston Southern Buccaneers (0–1) at No. 15 Furman Paladins (0–2) – Game summary

Quarter	1	2	3	4	Total
Buccaneers	6	8	7	3	24
No. 15 Paladins	0	10	7	3	20

at Paladin Stadium • Greenville, SC

- Date: Saturday September 7, 2024
- Game time: 6:00 p.m.
- Game weather: Sunny, 75 °F (24 °C)
- Game attendance: 8,377
- Referee: Brian Holland
- TV announcers (ESPN+): Brock Bowling (play-by-play) and Cole Neely (analyst)

Game information

First quarter
Second quarter
Third quarter
Fourth quarter

Statistics	CHSO	FUR
First downs		
Total yards		
Rushing yards		
Passing yards		
Passing: Comp–Att–Int		
Time of possession		

Team	Category	Player	Statistics
Charleston Southern	Passing		
Charleston Southern	Rushing		
Charleston Southern	Receiving		
Furman	Passing		
Furman	Rushing		
Furman	Receiving		

=== Stetson ===
Game Three – Stetson Hatters (2–0) vs Furman Paladins (0–2) – Game summary

Quarter	1	2	3	4	Total
Hatters	0	0	0	0	0
Paladins	0	0	0	0	0

at Paladin Stadium, Greenville, South Carolina

- Date: Saturday September 14, 2024
- Game time: 2:00 p.m.
- TV: ESPN+

Game information

First quarter
Second quarter
Third quarter
Fourth quarter

Statistics	STET	FUR
First downs		
Total yards		
Rushing yards		
Passing yards		
Passing: Comp–Att–Int		
Time of possession		

Team	Category	Player	Statistics
Stetson	Passing		
Stetson	Rushing		
Stetson	Receiving		
Furman	Passing		
Furman	Rushing		
Furman	Receiving		

=== at No. 12 William & Mary ===
Game Four – Furman Paladins (1–2) vs No. 12 William & Mary Tribe (2–1) – Game summary

Quarter	1	2	3	4	Total
Paladins	14	0	7	3	24
No. 12 Tribe	7	13	7	7	34

at Zable Stadium, Williamsburg, Virginia

- Date: Saturday September 21, 2024
- Game time: 6:00 p.m.
- TV: FloSports

Game information

First quarter
Second quarter
Third quarter
Fourth quarter

Statistics	FUR	W&M
First downs		
Total yards		
Rushing yards		
Passing yards		
Passing: Comp–Att–Int		
Time of possession		

Team	Category	Player	Statistics
Furman	Passing		
Furman	Rushing		
Furman	Receiving		
William & Mary	Passing		
William & Mary	Rushing		
William & Mary	Receiving		

=== Samford ===
Game Five – Samford Bulldogs (1–2) vs Furman Paladins (1–3) – Game summary

Quarter	1	2	3	4	Total
Bulldogs	0	0	0	0	0
Paladins	0	0	0	0	0

at Paladin Stadium, Greenville, South Carolina

- Date: Saturday September 28, 2024
- Game time: 2:00 p.m.
- TV: ESPN+

Game information

First quarter
Second quarter
Third quarter
Fourth quarter

Statistics	SAM	FUR
First downs		
Total yards		
Rushing yards		
Passing yards		
Passing: Comp–Att–Int		
Time of possession		

Team	Category	Player	Statistics
Samford	Passing		
Samford	Rushing		
Samford	Receiving		
Furman	Passing		
Furman	Rushing		
Furman	Receiving		

=== at The Citadel (rivalry) ===
Game Six – Furman Paladins (1–3) vs The Citadel Bulldogs (2–3) – Game summary

Quarter	1	2	3	4	Total
Paladins	0	0	0	0	0
Bulldogs	0	0	0	0	0

at Johnson Hagood Stadium • Charleston, SC

- Date: Saturday October 5, 2024
- Game time: 2:00 p.m.
- TV announcers (ESPN+): TBD

Game information

First quarter
Second quarter
Third quarter
Fourth quarter

Statistics	FUR	CIT
First downs		
Total yards		
Rushing yards		
Passing yards		
Passing: Comp–Att–Int		
Time of possession		

Team	Category	Player	Statistics
Furman	Passing		
Furman	Rushing		
Furman	Receiving		
The Citadel	Passing		
The Citadel	Rushing		
The Citadel	Receiving		

=== No. 23 Chattanooga ===
Game Seven – No. 23 Chattanooga Mocs (2–3) vs Furman Paladins (1–3) – Game summary

Quarter	1	2	3	4	Total
No. 23 Mocs	0	0	0	0	0
Paladins	0	0	0	0	0

at Paladin Stadium, Greenville, South Carolina

- Date: Saturday October 12, 2024
- Game time: 2:00 p.m.
- TV: ESPN+

Game information

First quarter
Second quarter
Third quarter
Fourth quarter

Statistics	UTC	FUR
First downs		
Total yards		
Rushing yards		
Passing yards		
Passing: Comp–Att–Int		
Time of possession		

Team	Category	Player	Statistics
Chattanooga	Passing		
Chattanooga	Rushing		
Chattanooga	Receiving		
Furman	Passing		
Furman	Rushing		
Furman	Receiving		

=== Western Carolina ===
Game Eight – Western Carolina Catamounts (3–3) vs Furman Paladins (2–4) – Game summary

Quarter	1	2	3	4	Total
Catamounts	0	0	0	0	0
Paladins	0	0	0	0	0

at Paladin Stadium, Greenville, SC

- Date: Saturday October 19, 2024
- Game time: 2:00 p.m.
- TV: ESPN+

Game information

First quarter
Second quarter
Third quarter
Fourth quarter

Statistics	WCU	FUR
First downs		
Total yards		
Rushing yards		
Passing yards		
Passing: Comp–Att–Int		
Time of possession		

Team	Category	Player	Statistics
Western Carolina	Passing		
Western Carolina	Rushing		
Western Carolina	Receiving		
Furman	Passing		
Furman	Rushing		
Furman	Receiving		

=== at VMI ===
Game Nine – Furman Paladins (2–5) vs VMI Keydets (0–8) – Game summary

Quarter	1	2	3	4	Total
Paladins	0	0	0	0	0
Keydets	0	0	0	0	0

at Alumni Memorial Field • Lexington, VA

- Date: Saturday November 2, 2024
- Game time: 1:30 p.m.
- TV announcers (ESPN+): TBD

Game information

First quarter
Second quarter
Third quarter
Fourth quarter

Statistics	FUR	VMI
First downs		
Total yards		
Rushing yards		
Passing yards		
Passing: Comp–Att–Int		
Time of possession		

Team	Category	Player	Statistics
Furman	Passing		
Furman	Rushing		
Furman	Receiving		
VMI	Passing		
VMI	Rushing		
VMI	Receiving		

=== Wofford (rivalry) ===
Game Ten – Wofford Terriers (4–5) at Furman Paladins (2–6) – Game summary

Quarter	1	2	3	4	Total
Terriers	0	0	0	0	0
Paladins	0	0	0	0	0

at Paladin Stadium • Greenville, SC

- Date: Saturday November 9, 2024
- Game time: 2:00 p.m.
- Game weather: 0 °F (−18 °C)
- TV: ESPN+

Game information

First quarter
Second quarter
Third quarter
Fourth quarter

Statistics	WOF	FUR
First downs		
Total yards		
Rushing yards		
Passing yards		
Passing: Comp–Att–Int		
Time of possession		

Team	Category	Player	Statistics
Wofford	Passing		
Wofford	Rushing		
Wofford	Receiving		
Furman	Passing		
Furman	Rushing		
Furman	Receiving		

=== at No. 21 East Tennessee State ===
Game Eleven – Furman Paladins (2–7) vs No. 21 East Tennessee State Buccaneers (6–4) – Game summary

Quarter	1	2	3	4	Total
Paladins	7	7	7	3	24
No. 21 Buccaneers	7	0	14	0	21

at William B. Greene Jr. Stadium, Johnson City, TN

- Date: Saturday November 16, 2024
- Game time: 12:00 p.m.
- Game weather: Sunny • Temperature: 55 °F (13 °C) • Wind: SW 3 mph
- Game attendance: 8,436
- Referee: Michael Farmer
- TV announcers (ESPN+): Pete Yanity (play-by-play), Jay Sonnhalter (analyst), and Jay Friedman (sideline reporter)

Game information

First quarter

- (11:18) FUR - Ben Ferguson 13-yard pass from Trey Hedden, Ian WIlliams kick (Drive: 6 plays, 34 yards, 2:21; Furman 7-0)
- (10:31) ETSU - Devontae Houston 64-yard run, Ewan Johnson kick (Drive: 2 plays, 75 yards, 0:47; Tied 7-7)

Second quarter

- (3:00) FUR - Myion Hicks 2-yard run, Ian Williams kick (Drive: 13 plays, 60 yards, 6:45; Furman 14-7)

Third quarter

- (10:52) ETSU - Gino English 1-yard run, Ewan Johnson kick (Drive: 8 plays, 58 yards, 2:28; Tied 14-14)
- (6:13) ETSU - Xavier Gaillardetz 42-yard pass from Gino English, Ewan Johnson kick (Drive: 4 plays, 57 yards, 1:45; East Tennessee State 21-14)
- (1:36) FUR - Trey Hedden 30-yard pass from Trey Hedden, Ian Williams kick (Drive: 9 plays, 91 yards, 4:28; Tied 21-21)

Fourth quarter

- (9:08) FUR - Ian Williams 21-yard field goal (Drive: 4 plays, 8 yards, 2:01; Furman 24-21)

Statistics	FUR	ETSU
First downs	18	20
Total yards	282	425
Rushing yards	72	200
Passing yards	210	225
Passing: Comp–Att–Int	23-28-1	16-26-3
Time of possession	34:39	25:21

Team	Category	Player	Statistics
Furman	Passing	Trey Hedden	23-28, 210 yards, 2 TD, INT
Furman	Rushing	Myion Hicks	21 carries, 65 yards, TD
Furman	Receiving	Colton Hinton	6 receptions, 62 yards, TD
East Tennessee State	Passing	Gino English	10-17, 142 yards, TD, 3 INT
East Tennessee State	Rushing	Devontae Houston	12 carries, 103 yards, TD
East Tennessee State	Receiving	AJ Johnson	6 receptions, 106 yards

=== at No. 8 Mercer ===
Game Twelve – Furman Paladins (3–7) vs No. 8 Mercer Bears (9–2) – Game summary

Quarter	1	2	3	4	Total
Paladins	0	0	0	0	0
No. 8 Bears	0	0	0	0	0

at Five Star Stadium • Macon, GA

- Date: Saturday November 23, 2024
- Game time: 3:00 p.m.
- TV announcers (ESPN+): TBD

Game information

First quarter
Second quarter
Third quarter
Fourth quarter

Statistics	FUR	MER
First downs		
Total yards		
Rushing yards		
Passing yards		
Passing: Comp–Att–Int		
Time of possession		

Team	Category	Player	Statistics
Furman	Passing		
Furman	Rushing		
Furman	Receiving		
Mercer	Passing		
Mercer	Rushing		
Mercer	Receiving		
