= Dylan Djete =

Canadian gridiron football player (born 2003)

No. 80 – Saskatchewan Roughriders
- Position: Wide receiver
- Roster status: Practice roster
- CFL status: National

Personal information
- Born: August 19, 2003 (age 23)
- Listed height: 5 ft 10 in (1.78 m)
- Listed weight: 185 lb (84 kg)

Career information
- High school: Clearwater Academy International (Clearwater, Florida)
- College: Wofford (2022–2024); Alabama State (2025)
- CFL draft: 2026: 2nd round, 18th overall pick

Career history
- Saskatchewan Roughriders (2026–present)

Awards and highlights
- Southern Conference All-Freshman Team (2022)
- Stats at CFL.ca

Dylan Djete (born August 19, 2003) is a Canadian professional football wide receiver for the Saskatchewan Roughriders of the Canadian Football League (CFL). He played college football for the Wofford Terriers and the Alabama State Hornets.

== Early life ==
Djete was born on August 19, 2003, and hails from Lévis, Quebec, Canada. He attended and played football at Clearwater Academy International in Clearwater, Florida. He primarily played at wide receiver along with quarterback and defensive back. Djete was also a member of Team Canada and competed in the 2020 U18 International Bowl. As a senior, he had 37 catches for 900 yards and 14 touchdowns in ten games as the team won the state championship.

== College career ==
Djete played college football for the Wofford Terriers from 2022 to 2024 and the Alabama State Hornets in 2025. As a freshman, he played in all eleven games and recorded 27 receptions for 431 yards and one touchdown. Djete was named to the Southern Conference All-Freshman team. The next season, he appeared in nine games and had 12 catches for 132 yards and one touchdown. In Djete's final season at Wofford, he made 20 catches for 209 yards and two touchdowns in 11 games.

For his senior season, Djete transferred to Alabama State University, where he played in 12 games and registered 28 receptions for 422 and four touchdowns.

== Professional career ==
Pre-draft measurables
Height	Weight	Arm length	Hand span	Wingspan	40-yard dash	10-yard split	20-yard split	20-yard shuttle	Three-cone drill	Vertical jump	Broad jump
5 ft 11 in (1.80 m)	184 lb (83 kg)	31 in (0.79 m)	9 3/8 in (0.24 m)	6 ft 3 in (1.91 m)	4.55 s	1.52 s	2.56 s	4.56 s	7.25 s	39.5 in (1.00 m)	10 ft 6 in (3.20 m)
All values from CFL Combine/Pro Day

Djete was selected by the Saskatchewan Roughriders in the second round, 18th overall, of the 2026 CFL draft. He signed with the team on May 4, 2026. On May 30, Djete was moved to the six-game injured list. On July 31, he was elevated to the practice roster and then the following day he was promoted again to the active roster. On August 1, Djete made his CFL debut against the Edmonton Elks. On August 7, he made his first start against the Ottawa Redblacks, recording four catches for 53 yards and one touchdown.

== Career statistics ==
Legend
**Bold**	Career high

=== College ===
Year	Team	Games		Receiving				Rushing			
Year	Team	GP	GS	Rec	Yds	Avg	TD	Att	Yds	Avg	TD
2022	Wofford	11	**8**	27	**431**	**16.0**	1	**2**	**9**	4.5	**1**
2023	Wofford	9	2	12	132	11.0	1	0	0	—	0
2024	Wofford	11	3	20	209	10.4	2	1	**9**	**9.0**	0
2025	Alabama State	**12**	**8**	**28**	422	15.1	**4**	1	8	8.0	0
Career		43	21	88	1,230	14.0	8	4	26	6.5	1
