= 2025 Boston College Eagles football team =

American college football season

2025 Boston College Eagles football
- Conference: Atlantic Coast Conference
- Record: 2–10 (1–7 ACC)
- Head coach: Bill O'Brien (2nd season)
- Offensive coordinator: Will Lawing (2nd season)
- Offensive scheme: Spread
- Defensive coordinator: Tim Lewis (2nd season)
- Base defense: 4–3
- Home stadium: Alumni Stadium

2025 Atlantic Coast Conference football standings
	Conf.			Overall
Team	W		L	W		L
No. 16 Virginia y	7	–	1	11	–	3
Duke y$	6	–	2	9	–	5
No. 2 Miami (FL) ^	6	–	2	13	–	3
Georgia Tech	6	–	2	9	–	4
SMU	6	–	2	9	–	4
Pittsburgh	6	–	2	8	–	5
Louisville	4	–	4	9	–	4
Wake Forest	4	–	4	9	–	4
NC State	4	–	4	8	–	5
California	4	–	4	7	–	6
Clemson	4	–	4	7	–	6
Stanford	3	–	5	4	–	8
Florida State	2	–	6	5	–	7
Virginia Tech	2	–	6	3	–	9
North Carolina	2	–	6	4	–	8
Boston College	1	–	7	2	–	10
Syracuse	1	–	7	3	–	9
Championship: Duke 27, Virginia 20^{OT}
^ – College Football Playoff participant; $ – Conference champion; y – Championship game participant; As of October 20, 2026; Rankings from AP Poll

The 2025 Boston College Eagles football team represented Boston College as a member of the Atlantic Coast Conference (ACC) during the 2025 NCAA Division I FBS football season. The Eagles were led by Bill O'Brien in his second season as their head coach. They played their home games at Alumni Stadium located in Chestnut Hill, Massachusetts.

The Boston College Eagles drew an average home attendance of 41,090.

== Schedule ==
Date	Time	Opponent	Site	TV	Result	Attendance
August 30	2:00 p.m.	Fordham*	Alumni Stadium; Chestnut Hill, MA	ACCNX/ESPN+	W 66–10	41,221
September 6	7:30 p.m.	at Michigan State*	Spartan Stadium; East Lansing, MI	NBC	L 40–42 ^{2OT}	70,510
September 13	10:30 p.m.	at Stanford	Stanford Stadium; Stanford, CA	ACCN	L 20–30	22,162
September 27	3:30 p.m.	California	Alumni Stadium; Chestnut Hill, MA	ACCN	L 24–28	44,500
October 4	12:00 p.m.	at Pittsburgh	Acrisure Stadium; Pittsburgh, PA	ACCN	L 7–48	51,101
October 11	7:30 p.m.	Clemson	Alumni Stadium; Chestnut Hill, MA (O'Rourke–McFadden Trophy)	ACCN	L 10–41	42,265
October 18	12:00 p.m.	UConn*	Alumni Stadium; Chestnut Hill, MA	ACCN	L 23–38	38,917
October 25	7:30 p.m.	at No. 19 Louisville	L&N Federal Credit Union Stadium; Louisville, KY	ACCN	L 24–38	50,320
November 1	3:30 p.m.	No. 12 Notre Dame*	Alumni Stadium; Chestnut Hill, MA (Holy War)	ESPN	L 10–25	44,500
November 8	12:00 p.m.	SMU	Alumni Stadium; Chestnut Hill, MA	ACCN	L 13–45	38,345
November 15	3:30 p.m.	No. 16 Georgia Tech	Alumni Stadium; Chestnut Hill, MA	ACCN	L 34–36	37,879
November 29	3:00 p.m.	at Syracuse	JMA Wireless Dome; Syracuse, NY	The CW	W 34–12	32,457
*Non-conference game; Rankings from AP Poll (and CFP Rankings, after November 4) - Released prior to game; All times are in Eastern time

== Personnel ==
Boston College signed 27 players in the class of 2025.

College recruiting
Name	Hometown	School	Height	Weight	Commit date
Stevie Amar; TE	Westlake Village, California	Oaks Christian School	6 ft 4 in (1.93 m)	225 lb (102 kg)	Aug 24, 2024
Stevie Amar; TE	Recruit ratings: Rivals: 247Sports: On3: ESPN: (76)				
Micah Amedee; DL	Westwood, Massachusetts	Xaverian Brothers	6 ft 3 in (1.91 m)	275 lb (125 kg)	Apr 15, 2024
Micah Amedee; DL	Recruit ratings: Rivals: 247Sports: On3: ESPN: (77)				
Nedrick Boldin Jr. ATH	West Palm Beach, Florida	Palm Beach Central	5 ft 11 in (1.80 m)	185 lb (84 kg)	Mar 12, 2024
Nedrick Boldin Jr. ATH	Recruit ratings: Rivals: 247Sports: On3: ESPN: (76)				
Kaelan Chudzinski; WR	Needham, Massachusetts	Saint Sebastian's School	6 ft 4 in (1.93 m)	210 lb (95 kg)	Dec 4, 2024
Kaelan Chudzinski; WR	Recruit ratings: Rivals: 247Sports: On3: ESPN: (74)				
Charleston Coldon; CB	Belleville, Illinois	Althoff Catholic	6 ft 1 in (1.85 m)	180 lb (82 kg)	Jun 23, 2024
Charleston Coldon; CB	Recruit ratings: Rivals: 247Sports: On3: ESPN: (74)				
Griffin Collins; LB	Worcester, Massachusetts	Worcester Academy	6 ft 3 in (1.91 m)	218 lb (99 kg)	Mar 11, 2024
Griffin Collins; LB	Recruit ratings: Rivals: 247Sports: On3: ESPN: (78)				
Ashton Cunningham; CB	Tulsa, Oklahoma	Union	5 ft 11 in (1.80 m)	155 lb (70 kg)	Jun 19, 2024
Ashton Cunningham; CB	Recruit ratings: Rivals: 247Sports: On3: ESPN: (78)				
Omarion Davis; S	Fort Mill, South Carolina	Indian Land	6 ft 0 in (1.83 m)	180 lb (82 kg)	Jun 11, 2024
Omarion Davis; S	Recruit ratings: Rivals: 247Sports: On3: ESPN: (76)				
Mekhi Dodd; RB	West Roxbury, Massachusetts	Catholic Memorial School	6 ft 0 in (1.83 m)	205 lb (93 kg)	May 3, 2024
Mekhi Dodd; RB	Recruit ratings: Rivals: 247Sports: On3: ESPN: (78)				
Semaj Fleming; WR	Orlando, Florida	Edgewater	5 ft 10 in (1.78 m)	175 lb (79 kg)	Jun 10, 2024
Semaj Fleming; WR	Recruit ratings: Rivals: 247Sports: On3: ESPN: (77)				
Jayden Fry; EDGE	Rolesville, North Carolina	Rolesville	6 ft 3.5 in (1.92 m)	230 lb (100 kg)	Nov 12, 2024
Jayden Fry; EDGE	Recruit ratings: Rivals: 247Sports: On3: ESPN: (73)				
TJ Green; ATH	Reynoldsburg, Ohio	Reynoldsburg	5 ft 11 in (1.80 m)	180 lb (82 kg)	Apr 15, 2024
TJ Green; ATH	Recruit ratings: Rivals: 247Sports: On3: ESPN: (76)				
Derrick Johnson; TE	New Orleans, Louisiana	Holy Cross	6 ft 3.5 in (1.92 m)	230 lb (100 kg)	Nov 5, 2024
Derrick Johnson; TE	Recruit ratings: Rivals: 247Sports: On3: ESPN: (77)				
Bryce Lewis; ATH	Roswell, Georgia	Blessed Trinity Catholic	6 ft 6 in (1.98 m)	200 lb (91 kg)	Jun 3, 2024
Bryce Lewis; ATH	Recruit ratings: Rivals: 247Sports: On3: ESPN: (75)				
Bo MacCormack; RB	Cambridge, Massachusetts	Buckingham Browne & Nichols School	6 ft 0 in (1.83 m)	190 lb (86 kg)	Nov 2, 2024
Bo MacCormack; RB	Recruit ratings: Rivals: 247Sports: On3: ESPN: (74)				
Israel Oladipupo; EDGE	Noblesville, Indiana	Noblesville	6 ft 3 in (1.91 m)	230 lb (100 kg)	Jun 15, 2024
Israel Oladipupo; EDGE	Recruit ratings: Rivals: 247Sports: On3: ESPN: (77)				
Dawson Pough; WR	Leesburg, Virginia	Tuscarora	5 ft 11 in (1.80 m)	190 lb (86 kg)	Jun 24, 2024
Dawson Pough; WR	Recruit ratings: Rivals: 247Sports: On3: ESPN: (76)				
Andy Quinn; P	Galway, Ireland	NFL Academy	6 ft 4 in (1.93 m)	195 lb (88 kg)	Nov 8, 2024
Andy Quinn; P	Recruit ratings: Rivals: 247Sports: On3: ESPN: (75)				
Shaker Reisig; QB	Tulsa, Oklahoma	Union	6 ft 0 in (1.83 m)	200 lb (91 kg)	Jun 18, 2024
Shaker Reisig; QB	Recruit ratings: Rivals: 247Sports: On3: ESPN: (77)				
Sterling Sanders; DL	Blythewood, South Carolina	Blythewood	6 ft 4 in (1.93 m)	315 lb (143 kg)	Oct 28, 2024
Sterling Sanders; DL	Recruit ratings: Rivals: 247Sports: On3: ESPN: (74)				
Njita Sinkala; CB	Oakdale, Connecticut	St. Thomas More	5 ft 11 in (1.80 m)	180 lb (82 kg)	Jun 16, 2024
Njita Sinkala; CB	Recruit ratings: Rivals: 247Sports: On3: ESPN: (76)				
Robert Smith IV; IOL	Cleveland, Ohio	Villa Angela-St. Joseph	6 ft 4 in (1.93 m)	290 lb (130 kg)	Jun 13, 2024
Robert Smith IV; IOL	Recruit ratings: Rivals: 247Sports: On3: ESPN: (77)				
Rae Sykes Jr. S	Rome, Georgia	Rome	6 ft 2 in (1.88 m)	190 lb (86 kg)	Jun 10, 2024
Rae Sykes Jr. S	Recruit ratings: Rivals: 247Sports: On3: ESPN: (75)				
Zacari Thomas; LB	Gray, Georgia	Jones County	6 ft 2 in (1.88 m)	215 lb (98 kg)	Jun 16, 2024
Zacari Thomas; LB	Recruit ratings: Rivals: 247Sports: On3: ESPN: (74)				
Marcelous Townsend; ATH	Roswell, Georgia	Blessed Trinity Catholic	5 ft 11 in (1.80 m)	175 lb (79 kg)	Jun 3, 2024
Marcelous Townsend; ATH	Recruit ratings: Rivals: 247Sports: On3: ESPN: (75)				
Marcus Upton; S	Atco, New Jersey	Winslow Township	6 ft 0 in (1.83 m)	185 lb (84 kg)	Jul 12, 2024
Marcus Upton; S	Recruit ratings: Rivals: 247Sports: On3: ESPN: (78)				
Denzil Williams; IOL	White Plains, New York	Archbishop Stepinac High School	6 ft 4 in (1.93 m)	300 lb (140 kg)	Jun 29, 2024
Denzil Williams; IOL	Recruit ratings: Rivals: 247Sports: On3: ESPN: (77)				

=== Transfer portal ===
Outgoing transfers
Player	Position	Destination
Nigel Tate	DL	UAB
Regen Terry	DL	TBD
Ryan Turner	CB	Purdue
Ilija Krajnovic	OT	Western Carolina
Kahlil Ali	S	Delaware
Montrell Wade	WR	Tyler JC
Jerand Bradley	WR	Kansas State
Jayden McGowan	WR	Charlotte
Cole Batson	S	UC Davis
Jack Brandon	QB	Tennessee State
Jalen Cheek	S	UAB
Sione Hala	LB	Weber State
Thomas Castellanos	QB	Florida State
Nick Thomas	IOL	Rhode Island
George Rooks	DL	Syracuse
Bryant Worrell	LS	Iowa

Incoming transfers
Player	Position	Previous School
Ty Lockwood	TE	Alabama
Favor Bate	EDGE	Merrimack
Onye Nwosisi	EDGE	Valparaiso
Dylan Lonergan	QB	Alabama
Chuck Nnaeto	DL	Elon
Amir Johnson	OT	Merrimack
Vaughn Pemberton	RB	Ball State
VJ Wilkins	WR	Campbell
Zeke Moore	TE	Florida Atlantic
Michael Bumpus	DL	Brown
Tommy Matheson	IOL	Princeton
Ben Mann	LS	Yale

== Game summaries ==
=== vs Fordham (FCS) ===
Fordham Rams (FCS) (0–0) at Boston College Eagles (0–0) – Game summary

Quarter	1	2	3	4	Total
Rams (FCS)	3	0	0	7	10
Eagles	14	7	24	21	66

at Alumni Stadium • Chestnut Hill, Massachusetts

- Date: August 30
- Game time: 2:00 p.m.
- Game weather: Sunny, 73 degrees
- Game attendance: 41,221
- Referee: Tim Hedgepeth
- TV announcers (ACCNX/ESPN+): Kevin Connors (play-by-play) and Craig Haubert (analyst)

Game information

First quarter

- BC – Jordan McDonald 11-yard pass from Dylan Lonergan (Luca Lombardo kick), 8:31. Eagles 7–0. Drive: 13 plays, 71 yards, 6:24.
- FOR – Bennett Henderson 46-yard field goal, 6:04. Eagles 7–3. Drive: 8 plays, 35 yards, 2:17.
- BC – Jaedn Skeete 11-yard pass from Dylan Lonergan (Luca Lombardo kick), 3:19. Eagles 14–3. Drive: 6 plays, 84 yards, 2:39.

Second quarter

- BC – Jaedn Skeete 13-yard pass from Dylan Lonergan (Luca Lombardo kick), 0:26. Eagles 21–3. Drive: 10 plays, 82 yards, 1:18.

Third quarter

- BC – Daveon Crouch 28-yard interception return (Luca Lombardo kick), 14:47. Eagles 28–3.
- BC – Luca Lombardo 48-yard field goal, 10:59. Eagles 31–3. Drive: 4 plays, 5 yards, 2:16.
- BC – Reed Harris 17-yard pass from Dylan Lonergan (Luca Lombardo kick), 5:21. Eagles 38–3. Drive: 9 plays, 51 yards, 4:07.
- BC – Turbo Richard 4-yard run (Luca Lombardo kick), 0:30. Eagles 45–3. Drive: 5 plays, 19 yards, 2:32.

Fourth quarter

- BC – Alex Broome 1-yard run (Luca Lombardo kick), 10:56. Eagles 52–3. Drive: 7 plays, 84 yards, 3:25.
- BC – Bo MacCormack III 2-yard run (Luca Lombardo kick), 9:11. Eagles 59–3. Drive: 2 plays, 57 yards, 0:28.
- FOR – Gunnar Smith 1-yard run (Bennett Henderson kick), 5:00. Eagles 59–10. Drive: 12 plays, 75 yards, 4:11.
- BC – Dawson Pough 22-yard pass from Grayson James (Luca Lombardo kick), 1:55. Eagles 66–10. Drive: 6 plays, 75 yards, 3:05.

Statistics	FOR	BC
First downs	13	26
Plays–yards	66–168	77–556
Rushes–yards	27–16	38–98
Passing yards	152	458
Passing: comp–att–int	20–39–1	31–39–0
Turnovers	1	0
Time of possession	25:55	34:05

Team	Category	Player	Statistics
Fordham	Passing	Gunnar Smith	20/39, 152 yards, INT
Fordham	Rushing	Ricky Parks	9 carries, 18 yards
Fordham	Receiving	Nodin Tracy	3 receptions, 34 yards
Boston College	Passing	Dylan Lonergan	26/34, 268 yards, 4 TD
Boston College	Rushing	Turbo Richard	16 carries, 48 yards, TD
Boston College	Receiving	Lewis Bond	11 receptions, 138 yards

=== at Michigan State ===
Boston College Eagles (1–0) at Michigan State Spartans (1–0) – Game summary

Quarter	1	2	3	4	OT	2OT	Total
Eagles	0	21	3	3	7	6	40
Spartans	7	7	10	3	7	8	42

at Spartan Stadium • East Lansing, Michigan

- Date: September 6
- Game time: 7:30 p.m.
- Game weather: 55 °F (13 °C), Wind: 3 mph NW, Cloudy
- Game attendance: 70,510
- Referee: Jerry Magallanes
- TV announcers (NBC): Noah Eagle (play-by-play), Todd Blackledge (analyst), and Kathryn Tappen (sideline)

Game information

First quarter

- (05:23) MSU - Nick Marsh 11-yard pass from Aidan Chiles (Blake Sislo kick), Drive: 11 plays, 80 yards, 5:53 (Spartans 7–0)

Second quarter

- (12:50) BC - Turbo Richard 8-yard pass from Dylan Lonergan, (Luca Lombardo kick), Drive: 6 plays, 88 yards, 3:03 (Tied 7–7)
- (07:45) BC - Jaedn Skeete 12-yard pass from Dylan Lonergan, (Luca Lombardo kick), Drive : 8 plays, 49 yards, 3:12 (Eagles 14–7)
- (05:40) MSU - Michael Masunas 3-yard pass from Aidan Chiles, (Blake Sislo kick), Drive: 4 plays, 33 yards, 1:50 (Tied 14–14)
- (00:31) BC - Reed Harris 14 yard pass from Dylan Lonergan (Luca Lombardo kick), Drive: 10 plays, 80 yards, 5:04 (Eagles 21–14)

Third quarter

- (12:50) MSU - Nick Marsh 41-yard pass from Aidan Chiles, (Blake Sislo kick), Drive: 4 plays, 75 yards, 2:10 (Tied 21–21)
- (07:00) BC - Dylan Lonergan 37-yard field goal, Drive: 10 plays, 56 yards, 5:46 (Eagles 24–21)
- (02:17) MSU - Martin Connington 50-yard field goal, Drive: 9 plays, 41-yard, 4:38 (Tied 24–24)

Fourth quarter

- (04:08) MSU - Martin Connington 39-yard field goal, Drive: 11 plays, 46 yards, 6:26 (Spartans 27–24)
- (01:16) BC - Luca Lombardo 38-yard field goal, Drive: 12 plays, 61 yards, 2:46 (Tied 27–27)

First Overtime

- (00:00) MSU - Jay Coyne 5-yard pass from Aidan Chiles, (Martin Connington kick), Drive: 5 plays, 25 yards, 00:00 (Spartans 34–27)
- (00:00) BC - Jeremiah Franklin 6-yard pass from Dylan Lonergan, (Luca Lombardo kick), Drive: 4 plays, 25 yards, 00:00 (Tied 34–34)

Second Overtime

- (00:00) BC - Turbo Richard 8-yaed run (Two point conversion failed pass), Drive: 2 plays, 25 yards, 00:00 (Eagles 40–34)
- (00:00) MSU - Aidan Chiles 3-yard run (Two point conversion good Omari Kelly pass), Drive: 3 plays, 25 yards, 00:00 (Spartans 42–40)

Statistics	BC	MSU
First downs	25	21
Plays–yards	70–457	64–380
Rushes–yards	25–67	35–149
Passing yards	390	231
Passing: comp–att–int	34–45–0	19–29–0
Turnovers	1	1
Time of possession	30:12	29:48

Team	Category	Player	Statistics
Boston College	Passing	Dylan Lonergan	34/45, 390 yards, 4 TD
Boston College	Rushing	Turbo Richard	13 carries, 55 yards, TD
Boston College	Receiving	Lewis Bond	11 receptions, 90 yards
Michigan State	Passing	Aidan Chiles	19/29, 231 yards, 4 TD
Michigan State	Rushing	Makhi Frazier	17 carries, 81 yards
Michigan State	Receiving	Nick Marsh	5 receptions, 68 yards, 2 TD

=== at Stanford ===
Boston College Eagles (1–1) at Stanford Cardinal (0–2) – Game summary

Quarter	1	2	3	4	Total
Eagles	0	20	0	0	20
Cardinal	6	14	7	3	30

at Stanford Stadium • Stanford, California

- Date: September 13
- Game time: 10:30 p.m.
- Game weather: Sunny
- Game attendance: 22,162
- Referee: Mike Roche
- TV announcers (ACCN): Wes Durham (play-by-play), Steve Addazio (analyst), and Dana Boyle (sideline)

Game information

First quarter

- STAN – Emmet Kenney 23-yard field goal, 7:10. Cardinal 3–0. Drive: 13 plays, 70 yards, 7:50.
- STAN – Emmet Kenney 35-yard field goal, 1:04. Cardinal 6–0. Drive: 5 plays, 42 yards, 2:13.

Second quarter

- BC – Luca Lombardo 51-yard field goal, 13:38. Cardinal 6–3. Drive: 8 plays, 43 yards, 2:26.
- BC – Turbo Richard 49-yard pass from Dylan Lonergan (Luca Lombardo kick), 10:43. Eagles 10–6. Drive: 5 plays, 73 yards, 2:02.
- BC – Jordan McDonald 2-yard run (Luca Lombardo kick), 8:04. Eagles 17–6. Drive: 4 plays, 74 yards, 1:35.
- STAN – Sam Roush 69-yard pass from Ben Gulbranson (Emmet Kenney kick), 1:47. Eagles 17–13. Drive: 3 plays, 76 yards, 0:54.
- STAN – Collin Wright 19-yard interception return (Emmet Kenney kick), 1:29. Cardinal 20–17.
- BC – Luca Lombardo 31-yard field goal, 0:00. Tied 20–20. Drive: 12 plays, 62 yards, 1:29.

Third quarter

- STAN – Micah Ford 5-yard run (Emmet Kenney kick), 1:35. Cardinal 27–20. Drive: 2 plays, 80 yards, 0:57.

Fourth quarter

- STAN – Emmet Kenney 26-yard field goal, 11:26. Cardinal 30–20. Drive: 8 plays, 48 yards, 3:34.

Statistics	BC	STAN
First downs	19	15
Plays–yards	67–389	56–409
Rushes–yards	23–56	34–223
Passing yards	333	186
Passing: comp–att–int	30–44–1	13–22–0
Turnovers	3	0
Time of possession	28:16	31:44

Team	Category	Player	Statistics
Boston College	Passing	Dylan Lonergan	30/44, 333 yards, TD, INT
Boston College	Rushing	Turbo Richard	14 carries, 55 yards
Boston College	Receiving	Reed Harris	7 receptions, 141 yards
Stanford	Passing	Ben Gulbranson	13/22, 186 yards, TD
Stanford	Rushing	Micah Ford	17 carries, 157 yards, TD
Stanford	Receiving	Sam Roush	3 receptions, 79 yards, TD

=== vs California ===
California Golden Bears (3–1) at Boston College Eagles (1–2) – Game summary

Quarter	1	2	3	4	Total
Golden Bears	7	7	0	14	28
Eagles	14	3	0	7	24

at Alumni Stadium • Chestnut Hill, Massachusetts

- Date: September 27
- Game time: 3:30 p.m.
- Game weather: Temperature: 77 °F (25 °C) • Wind: N at 7 miles per hour (11 km/h) • Weather: Sunny
- Game attendance: 44,500
- Referee: Riley Johnson
- TV announcers (ACCN): Chris Cotter (play-by-play), Max Browne (analyst), and Kendra Douglas (sideline)

Game information

First quarter

- (8:56) BC – Dylan Lonergan 7-yard run, Luca Lombardo kick (Drive: 12 plays, 84 yards, 5:54; Boston College 7–0)
- (7:47) BC – Turbo Richard 27-yard run, Luca Lombardo kick (Drive: 2 plays, 27 yards, 0:15; Boston College 14–0)
- (1:05) CAL – LJ Johnson Jr. 1-yard run, Chase Meyer kick (Drive: 12 plays, 74 yards, 6:42; Boston College 14–7)

Second quarter

- (3:46) CAL – Jacob De Jesus 5-yard pass from Jaron-Keawe Sagapolutele, Chase Meyer kick (Drive: 14 plays, 84 yards, 9:03; Tied 14–14)
- (0:37) BC – Luca Lombardo 52-yard field goal (Drive: 12 plays, 36 yards, 3:04; Boston College 17–14)

Third quarter

No scoring plays

Fourth quarter

- (13:47) CAL – Kendrick Raphael 2-yard run, Chase Meyer kick (Drive: 1 play, 2 yards, 0:06; California 21–17)
- (13:35) BC – Turbo Richard 71-yard run, Luca Lombardo kick (Drive: 1 play, 71 yards, 0:12; Boston College 24–21)
- (1:30) CAL – Mason Mini 51-yard pass from Jaron-Keawe Sagapolutele, Chase Meyer kick (Drive: 9 plays, 88 yards, 3:18; California 28–24)

Statistics	CAL	BC
First downs	23	20
Plays–yards	71–372	58–375
Rushes–yards	37–118	21–178
Passing yards	254	197
Passing: comp–att–int	22–34–1	21–37–2
Turnovers	1	2
Time of possession	35:15	24:45

Team	Category	Player	Statistics
California	Passing	Jaron-Keawe Sagapolutele	22/34, 254 yards, 2 TD, INT
California	Rushing	Kendrick Raphael	25 carries, 119 yards, TD
California	Receiving	Trond Grizzell	5 receptions, 78 yards
Boston College	Passing	Dylan Lonergan	21/37, 197 yards, 2 INT
Boston College	Rushing	Turbo Richard	15 carries, 171 yards, 2 TD
Boston College	Receiving	Lewis Bond	7 receptions, 77 yards

=== at Pittsburgh ===
Boston College Eagles (1–3) at Pittsburgh Panthers (2–2) – Game summary

Quarter	1	2	3	4	Total
Eagles	0	0	0	7	7
Panthers	10	21	14	3	48

at Acrisure Stadium • Pittsburgh, Pennsylvania

- Date: October 4
- Game time: 12:00 p.m.
- Game weather: Sunny • Temperature: 73 °F (23 °C) • Wind: S at 3 miles per hour (4.8 km/h)
- Game attendance: 51,101
- Referee: Jon Noli
- TV announcers (ACCN): Chris Cotter (play-by-play), Max Browne (analyst), and Kendra Douglas (sideline)

Game information

First quarter

- (7:22) PITT – Justin Holmes 14-yard pass from Mason Heintschel, Trey Butkowski kick (Drive: 11 plays, 76 yards, 5:30; Pittsburgh 7–0)
- (0:39) PITT – Trey Butkowski 31-yard field goal (Drive: 10 plays, 42 yards, 4:25; Pittsburgh 10–0)

Second quarter

- (6:25) PITT – Kenny Johnson 12-yard pass from Mason Heintschel, Trey Butkowski kick (Drive: 9 plays, 66 yards, 3:51; Pittsburgh 17–0)
- (1:56) PITT – Juelz Goff 3-yard run, Trey Butkowski kick (Drive: 12 plays, 65 yards, 3:46; Pittsburgh 24–0)
- (0:10) PITT – Ja'Kyrian Turner 6-yard run, Trey Butkowski kick (Drive: 6 plays, 62 yards, 1:01; Pittsburgh 31–0)

Third quarter

- (9:08) PITT – Deuce Spann 10-yard pass from Mason Heintschel, Trey Butkowski kick (Drive: 7 plays, 39 yards, 3:13; Pittsburgh 38–0)
- (1:39) PITT – Zion Fowler-El 18-yard pass from Mason Heintschel, Trey Butkowski kick (Drive: 10 plays, 61 yards, 5:32; Pittsburgh 45–0)

Fourth quarter

- (8:28) PITT – Trey Butkowski 47-yard field goal (Drive: 10 plays, 47 yards, 4:57; Pittsburgh 48–0)
- (1:57) BC – Kaelan Chudzinski 3-yard pass from Shaker Reisig, Luca Lombardo kick (Drive: 9 plays, 80 yards, 4:01; Pittsburgh 48–7)

Statistics	BC	PITT
First downs	11	31
Plays–yards	54–216	88–503
Rushes–yards	24–27	43–172
Passing yards	189	331
Passing: comp–att–int	14–30–1	32–45–0
Turnovers	3	0
Time of possession	20:52	39:08

Team	Category	Player	Statistics
Boston College	Passing	Dylan Lonergan	9/18, 89 yards
Boston College	Rushing	Jordan McDonald	5 carries, 31 yards
Boston College	Receiving	Kaelan Chudzinski	3 receptions, 70 yards, TD
Pittsburgh	Passing	Mason Heintschel	30/41, 323 yards, 4 TD
Pittsburgh	Rushing	Ja'Kyrian Turner	12 carries, 67 yards, TD
Pittsburgh	Receiving	Kenny Johnson	9 receptions, 115 yards, TD

=== vs Clemson (O'Rourke–McFadden Trophy) ===
Clemson Tigers (2–3) at Boston College Eagles (1–4) – Game summary

Quarter	1	2	3	4	Total
Tigers	10	24	0	7	41
Eagles	3	7	0	0	10

at Alumni Stadium • Chestnut Hill, Massachusetts

- Date: October 11
- Game time: 7:30 p.m.
- Game weather: Temperature: 65 °F (18 °C) • Wind: Calm • Weather: Sunny
- Game attendance: 42,265
- Referee: Justin Elliot
- TV announcers (ACCN): Chris Cotter (play-by-play), Forrest Conoly (analyst), and Kendra Douglas (sideline)

Game information

First quarter

- (08:24) CLEM – Nolan Hauser 46-yard field goal (Drive: 13 plays, 42 yards, 6:31; CLEM 3–0)
- (04:05) CLEM – Adam Randall 8-yard run, Nolan Hauser kick (Drive: 6 plays, 67 yards, 3:04; CLEM 10–0)
- (01:37) BC – Luca Lombardo 45-yard field goal (Drive: 7 plays, 48 yards, 2:28; CLEM 10–3)

Second quarter

- (13:05) CLEM – Peter Woods 2-yard run, Nolan Hauser kick (Drive: 8 plays, 75 yards, 3:32; CLEM 17–3)
- (09:10) BC – Turbo Richard 2-yard run, Luca Lombardo kick (Drive: 10 plays, 75 yards, 3:55; CLEM 17–10)
- (05:31) CLEM – Cade Klubnik 6-yard run, Nolan Hauser kick (Drive: 9 plays, 68 yards, 3:33; CLEM 24–10)
- (01:23) CLEM – Bryant Wesco Jr. 38-yard pass from Cade Klubnik, Nolan Hauser kick (Drive: 3 plays, 70 yards, 0:31; CLEM 31–10)
- (00:00) CLEM – Nolan Hauser 50-yard field goal (Drive: 3 plays, 11 yards, 0:12; CLEM 34–10)

Third quarter

- No scoring plays.

Fourth quarter

- (00:24) CLEM – Keith Adams Jr. 1-yard run, Nolan Hauser kick (Drive: 10 plays, 60 yards, 5:02; CLEM 41–10)

Statistics	CLEM	BC
First downs	28	15
Plays–yards	76–504	61–221
Rushes–yards	43–226	32–85
Passing yards	278	136
Passing: comp–att–int	23–33–2	15–29–1
Turnovers	2	1
Time of possession	37:21	22:39

Team	Category	Player	Statistics
Clemson	Passing	Cade Klubnik	22/30, 280 yards, TD, INT
Clemson	Rushing	Keith Adams Jr.	7 carries, 49 yards
Clemson	Receiving	Bryant Wesco Jr.	5 receptions, 106 yards, TD
Boston College	Passing	Dylan Lonergan	12/19, 117 yards
Boston College	Rushing	Turbo Richard	18 carries, 75 yards, TD
Boston College	Receiving	Lewis Bond	7 receptions, 70 yards

=== vs UConn ===
UConn Huskies (4–2) at Boston College Eagles (1–5) – Game summary

Quarter	1	2	3	4	Total
Huskies	7	10	14	7	38
Eagles	6	14	0	3	23

at Alumni Stadium • Chestnut Hill, Massachusetts

- Date: October 18
- Game time: 12:00 p.m.
- Game weather: Sunny • Temperature: 58 °F (14 °C)
- Game attendance: 38,917
- Referee: Nate Black
- TV announcers (ACCN): Jorge Sedano (play-by-play), Rodney McLeod (analyst), and Victoria Arlen (sideline)

Game information

First quarter

- BC - Luca Lombardo 47-yard field goal, 9:13. Eagles 3–0. Drive: 12 plays, 46 yards, 05:47.
- CONN - Juice Vereen 50-yard pass from Joe Fagnano (Chris Freeman kick), 6:06. Huskies 7–3. Drive: 6 plays, 75 yards, 03:07.
- BC - Luca Lombardo 22-yard field goal, 0:35. Huskies 7–6. Drive: 13 plays, 67 yards, 05:24.

Second quarter

- CONN - Joe Fagnano 2-yard run (Chris Freeman kick), 11:41. Huskies 14–6. Drive: 9 plays, 80 yards, 03:47.
- BC - Kaelan Chudzinski 9-yard pass from Grayson James (Luca Lombardo kick), 7:31. Huskies 14–13. Drive: 10 plays, 75 yards, 04:10.
- CONN - Chris Freeman 40-yard field goal, 5:52. Huskies 17–13. Drive: 5 plays, 38 yards, 01:39.
- BC - Reed Harris 39-yard pass from Grayson James (Luca Lombardo kick), 0:21. Eagles 20–17. Drive: 7 plays, 62 yards, 01:17.

Third quarter

- CONN - John Neider 43-yard pass from Joe Fagnano (Chris Freeman kick), 11:51. Huskies 24–20. Drive: 6 plays, 75 yards, 03:09.
- CONN - Juice Vereen 14-yard pass from Joe Fagnano (Chris Freeman kick), 0:49. Huskies 31–20. Drive: 5 plays, 45 yards, 02:16.

Fourth quarter

- BC - Luca Lombardo 25-yard field goal, 10:40. Huskies 31–23. Drive: 14 plays, 78 yards, 05:03.
- CONN - Skyler Bell 38-yard pass from Joe Fagnano (Chris Freeman kick), 5:04. Huskies 38–23. Drive: 5 plays, 55 yards, 02:05.

Statistics	CONN	BC
First downs	20	24
Plays–yards	58–455	77–395
Rushes–yards	27–93	49–191
Passing yards	362	204
Passing: comp–att–int	23–31–0	16–28–0
Turnovers	0	0
Time of possession	27:52	32:08

Team	Category	Player	Statistics
UConn	Passing	Joe Fagnano	23/31, 362 yards, 4 TD
UConn	Rushing	Cam Edwards	12 carries, 57 yards
UConn	Receiving	Skyler Bell	10 receptions, 125 yards, TD
Boston College	Passing	Grayson James	16/28, 204 yards, 2 TD
Boston College	Rushing	Jordan McDonald	24 carries, 123 yards
Boston College	Receiving	Lewis Bond	5 receptions, 69 yards

=== at No. 19 Louisville ===
Boston College Eagles (1–6) at No. 19 Louisville Cardinals (5–1) – Game summary

Quarter	1	2	3	4	Total
Eagles	3	7	7	7	24
No. 19 Cardinals	7	14	7	10	38

at L&N Federal Credit Union Stadium • Louisville, Kentucky

- Date: October 25
- Game time: 7:30 p.m.
- Game weather: Cloudy • Temperature: 57 °F (14 °C) • Wind: NE at 6 miles per hour (9.7 km/h)
- Game attendance: 50,320
- Referee: Riley Johnson
- TV announcers (ACCN): Jorge Sedano (play-by-play), Rodney McLeod (analyst), and Victoria Arlen (sideline)

Game information

First quarter

- (6:36) BC – Luca Lombardo 38-yard field goal (Drive: 15 plays, 55 yards, 8:24; Boston College 3–0)
- (4:49) LOU – Miller Moss 1-yard run (Cooper Ranvier kick) (Drive: 3 plays, 75 yards, 1:47; Louisville 7–3)

Second quarter

- (14:56) BC – Lewis Bond 6-yard pass from Grayson James (Luca Lombardo kick) (Drive: 10 plays, 75 yards, 4:53; Boston College 10–7)
- (1:42) LOU – Miller Moss 9-yard run (Cooper Ranvier kick) (Drive: 5 plays, 56 yards, 1:10; Louisville 14–10)
- (1:02) LOU – Isaac Brown 62-yard run (Cooper Ranvier kick) (Drive: 1 play, 62 yards, 0:09; Louisville 21–10)

Third quarter

- (14:08) BC – Kaelan Chudzinski 23-yard pass from Grayson James (Luca Lombardo kick) (Drive: 2 plays, 34 yards, 0:42; Louisville 21–17)
- (7:34) LOU – Caullin Lacy 22-yard pass from Miller Moss (Cooper Ranvier kick) (Drive: 2 plays, 27 yards, 0:16; Louisville 28–17)

Fourth quarter

- (8:13) LOU – Cooper Ranvier 41-yard field goal (Drive: 4 plays, 7 yards, 2:21; Louisville 31–17)
- (6:17) BC – Jeremiah Franklin 21-yard pass from Grayson James (Luca Lombardo kick) (Drive: 8 plays, 68 yards, 1:48; Louisville 31–24)
- (1:49) LOU – Keyjuan Brown 67-yard run (Cooper Ranvier kick) (Drive: 5 plays, 83 yards, 1:10; Louisville 38–24)

Statistics	BC	LOU
First downs	20	16
Plays–yards	82–360	59–504
Rushes–yards	36–116	31–317
Passing yards	244	187
Passing: comp–att–int	23–46–2	15–28–1
Turnovers	3	3
Time of possession	35:44	24:16

Team	Category	Player	Statistics
Boston College	Passing	Grayson James	23/46, 244 yards, 3 TD, 2 INT
Boston College	Rushing	Jordan McDonald	19 carries, 80 yards
Boston College	Receiving	Kaelan Chudzinski	4 receptions, 80 yards, TD
Louisville	Passing	Miller Moss	15/28, 187 yards, TD, INT
Louisville	Rushing	Isaac Brown	14 carries, 205 yards, TD
Louisville	Receiving	Chris Bell	4 receptions, 49 yards

=== vs No. 12 Notre Dame (Holy War) ===
No. 12 Notre Dame Fighting Irish (5–2) at Boston College Eagles (1–7) – Game summary

Quarter	1	2	3	4	Total
No. 12 Fighting Irish	0	12	6	7	25
Eagles	0	7	3	0	10

at Alumni Stadium • Chestnut Hill, Massachusetts

- Date: November 1
- Game time: 3:30 p.m.
- Game weather: Sunny • Temperature: 53 °F (12 °C) • Wind: W at 16 miles per hour (26 km/h)
- Game attendance: 44,500
- Referee: Jon Noli
- TV announcers (ESPN): Roy Philpott (play-by-play), Brock Osweiler (analyst), and Stormy Buonantony (sideline)

Game information

First quarter

- No scoring plays.

Second quarter

- (14:52) ND – Malachi Fields 40-yard pass from CJ Carr, Noah Burnette kick missed (Drive: 10 plays, 85 yards, 5:20, Notre Dame 6–0)
- (1:53) ND – Will Pauling 44-yard pass from CJ Carr, Jeremiyah Love pass from CJ Carr failed (Drive: 4 plays, 73 yards, 1:30, Notre Dame 12–0)
- (0:22) BC – Reed Harris 25-yard pass from Grayson James, Luca Lombardo kick (Drive: 7 plays, 75 yards, 1:31, Notre Dame 12–7)

Third quarter

- (3:36) BC – Luca Lombardo 25-yard field goal (Drive: 21 plays, 74 yards, 11:20, Notre Dame 12–10)
- (0:32) ND – Jeremiyah Love 3-yard run, Marcello Diomede kick missed (Drive: 7 plays, 75 yards, 3:04, Notre Dame 18–10)

Fourth quarter

- (11:07) ND – Jeremiyah Love 94-yard run, Erik Schmidt kick (Drive: 1 play, 94 yards, 0:14, Notre Dame 25–10)

Statistics	ND	BC
First downs	22	21
Plays–yards	55–458	78–281
Rushes–yards	29–159	33–12
Passing yards	299	269
Passing: comp–att–int	18–26–0	30–45–3
Turnovers	1	3
Time of possession	24:33	35:27

Team	Category	Player	Statistics
Notre Dame	Passing	CJ Carr	18/25, 299 yards, 2 TD
Notre Dame	Rushing	Jeremiyah Love	17 carries, 136 yards, 2 TD
Notre Dame	Receiving	Jordan Faison	4 receptions, 82 yards
Boston College	Passing	Grayson James	25/37, 240 yards, TD, 2 INT
Boston College	Rushing	Turbo Richard	16 carries, 26 yards
Boston College	Receiving	Lewis Bond	8 receptions, 92 yards

=== vs SMU ===
SMU Mustangs (6–3) at Boston College Eagles (1–8) – Game summary

Quarter	1	2	3	4	Total
Mustangs	10	7	14	14	45
Eagles	0	6	0	7	13

at Alumni Stadium • Chestnut Hill, Massachusetts

- Date: November 8
- Game time: 12:00 p.m.
- Game weather: 56 degrees, Cloudy
- Game attendance: 38,345
- Referee: Mike Roche
- TV announcers (ACCN): Chris Cotter (play-by-play), Max Browne (analyst) and Kendra Douglas (sideline)

Game information

First quarter

- SMU – Derrick McFall 1-yard run (Sam Keltner kick), 8:56. Mustangs 7–0. Drive: 7 plays, 70 yards, 2:05.
- SMU – Sam Keltner 20-yard field goal, 6:35. Mustangs 10–0. Drive: 5 plays, 30 yards, 1:07.

Second quarter

- SMU – Jordan Hudson 25-yard pass from Kevin Jennings (Sam Keltner kick), 3:01. Mustangs 17–0. Drive: 4 plays, 68 yards, 1:20.
- BC – Luca Lombardo 31-yard field goal, 1:11. Mustangs 17–3. Drive: 8 plays, 57 yards, 1:50.
- BC – Luca Lombardo 36-yard field goal, 0:04. Mustangs 17–6. Drive: 2 plays, 19 yards, 0:11.

Third quarter

- SMU – Yamir Knight 61-yard pass from Kevin Jennings (Sam Keltner kick), 10:02. Mustangs 24–6. Drive: 7 plays, 79 yards, 2:33.
- SMU – Matthew Hibner 37-yard pass from Kevin Jennings (Sam Keltner kick), 4:46. Mustangs 31–6. Drive: 7 plays, 39 yards, 4:08.

Fourth quarter

- SMU – Derrick McFall 6-yard run (Sam Keltner kick), 13:25. Mustangs 38–6. Drive: 5 plays, 67 yards, 2:32.
- BC – Jordan McDonald 5-yard pass from Dylan Lonergan (Luca Lombardo kick), 8:59. Mustangs 38–13. Drive: 13 plays, 73 yards, 4:22.
- SMU – Derrick McFall 48-yard run (Stone Eby kick), 6:38. Mustangs 45–13. Drive: 4 plays, 75 yards, 2:21.

Statistics	SMU	BC
First downs	22	25
Plays–yards	66–574	85–390
Rushes–yards	31-222	40–106
Passing yards	352	284
Passing: comp–att–int	18–26–0	30–45–3
Turnovers	1	4
Time of possession	27:02	32:58

Team	Category	Player	Statistics
SMU	Passing	Kevin Jennings	16/32, 326 yards, 3 TD, INT
SMU	Rushing	TJ Harden	16 carries, 130 yards
SMU	Receiving	Yamir Knight	7 receptions, 162 yards, TD
Boston College	Passing	Dylan Lonergan	25/37, 232 yards, TD, INT
Boston College	Rushing	Turbo Richard	15 carries, 49 yards
Boston College	Receiving	Lewis Bond	9 receptions, 94 yards

=== vs No. 16 Georgia Tech ===
No. 16 Georgia Tech Yellow Jackets (8–1) at Boston College Eagles (1–9) – Game summary

Quarter	1	2	3	4	Total
No. 16 Yellow Jackets	7	7	3	19	36
Eagles	0	14	14	6	34

at Alumni Stadium • Chestnut Hill, Massachusetts

- Date: November 15
- Game time: 3:30 p.m. EST
- Game weather: Sunny, 46 degrees
- Game attendance: 37,879
- Referee: Jerry Magallanes
- TV announcers (ACCN): Wes Durham (play-by-play), Steve Addazio (analyst), and Dana Boyle (sideline)

Game information

First quarter

- (4:59) GT - Malachi Hosley 27-yard run, Aidan Birr kick (Drive: 7 plays, 83 yards, 3:36, Georgia Tech 7-0)

Second quarter

- (14:19) BC - Turbo Richard 1-yard run, Luca Lombardo kick (Drive: 11 plays, 75 yards, 5:40, Tied 7-7)
- (9:44) GT - Malik Rutherford 71-yard pass from Haynes King, Aidan Birr kick (Drive: 4 plays, 84 yards, 1:58, Georgia Tech 14-7)
- (0:22) BC - Kaelan Chudzinski 3-yard pass from Dylan Lonergan, Luca Lombardo kick (Drive: 10 plays, 93 yards, 1:04, Tied 14-14)

Third quarter

- (12:05) BC - Jordan McDonald 14-yard run, Luca Lombardo kick (Drive: 7 plays, 75 yards, 2:55, Boston College 21-14)
- (4:35) GT - Aidan Birr 34-yard field goal (Drive: 14 plays, 55 yards, 7:23, Boston College 21-17)
- (1:19) BC - Reed Harris 18-yard pass from Dylan Lonergan, Luca Lombardo kick (Drive: 6 plays, 75 yards, 3:16, Boston College 28-17)

Fourth quarter

- (13:52) GT - Aidan Birr 26-yard field goal (Drive: 10 plays, 66 yards, 2:27, Boston College 28-20)
- (7:33) GT - Jamal Haynes 2-yard run, two-point run conversion failed (Drive: 9 plays, 78 yards, 3:47, Boston College 28-26)
- (6:14) GT - Jordan Allen 54-yard run, Aidan Birr kick (Drive: 1 play, 54 yards, 0:10, Georgia Tech 33-28)
- (4:09) BC - Turbo Richard 43-yard run, two-point pass conversion failed (Drive, 5 plays, 75 yards, 2:05, Boston College 34-33)
- (0:11) GT - Aidan Birr 23-yard field goal (Drive: 13 plays, 68 yards, 3:58, Georgia Tech 36-34)

Statistics	GT	BC
First downs	30	24
Plays–yards	76-628	66-537
Rushes–yards	42-257	26-175
Passing yards	371	362
Passing: comp–att–int	26-34-0	26-40-0
Turnovers	1	0
Time of possession	32:44	27:16

Team	Category	Player	Statistics
Georgia Tech	Passing	Haynes King	26/34, 371 yards, TD
Georgia Tech	Rushing	Malachi Hosley	15 carries, 107 yards, TD
Georgia Tech	Receiving	Malik Rutherford	5 receptions, 121 yards, TD
Boston College	Passing	Dylan Lonergan	26/40, 362 yards, 2 TD
Boston College	Rushing	Turbo Richard	11 carries, 141 yards, 2 TD
Boston College	Receiving	Reed Harris	5 receptions, 142 yards, 1 TD

=== at Syracuse ===
Boston College Eagles (1–10) at Syracuse Orange (3–8) – Game summary

Quarter	1	2	3	4	Total
Eagles	3	3	14	14	34
Orange	0	6	0	6	12

at JMA Wireless Dome • Syracuse, New York

- Date: November 29
- Game time: 3:00 p.m. EST
- Game weather: Indoor
- Game attendance: 32,457
- Referee: John Noli
- TV announcers (The CW): Thom Brennaman (play-by-play), Will Blackmon (analyst) and Wes Bryant (sideline)

Game information

First quarter

- BC – Luca Lombardo 30-yard field goal, 4:04. Eagles 3–0. Drive: 7 plays, 28 yards, 3:54.

Second quarter

- SYR – Tripp Woody 49-yard field goal, 14:15. Tied 3–3. Drive: 8 plays, 53 yards, 4:44.
- SYR – Tripp Woody 29-yard field goal, 3:05. Orange 6–3. Drive: 14 plays, 65 yards, 9:36.
- BC – Luca Lombardo 31-yard field goal, 0:28. Tied 6–6. Drive: 9 plays, 62 tards, 2:37.

Third quarter

- BC – Turbo Richard 16-yard run (Luca Lombardo kick), 11:54. Eagles 13–6. Drive: 3 plays, 79 yards, 0:59.
- BC – Jordan McDonald 2-yard run (Luca Lombardo kick), 0:59. Eagles 20–6. Drive: 8 plays, 69 yards, 4:12.

Fourth quarter

- BC – Turbo Richard 46-yard run (Luca Lombardo kick), 13:35. Eagles 27–6. Drive: 2 plays, 71 yards, 0:35.
- BC – Jordan McDonald 14-yard run (Luca Lombardo kick), 9:24. Eagles 34–6. Drive: 7 plays, 68 yards, 3:08.
- SYR – Dan Villari 1-yard run (pass failed), 3:20. Eagles 34–12. Drive: 12 plays, 75 yards, 6:04.

Statistics	BC	SYR
First downs	20	12
Total yards	55–433	59–254
Rushes–yards	29–137	41–189
Passing yards	296	65
Passing: comp–att–int	18–26–0	10–18–0
Turnovers	0	0
Time of possession	26:50	33:10

Team	Category	Player	Statistics
Boston College	Passing	Grayson James	16/24, 288 yards
Boston College	Rushing	Turbo Richard	15 carries, 102 yards, 2 TD
Boston College	Receiving	Lewis Bond	8 receptions, 171 yards
Syracuse	Passing	Joseph Filardi	10/18, 65 yards
Syracuse	Rushing	Will Nixon	16 carries, 73 yards
Syracuse	Receiving	Johntay Cook	3 receptions, 28 yards
