= 2025 Clemson Tigers football team =

American college football season

2025 Clemson Tigers football

Pinstripe Bowl, L 10–22 vs. Penn State
- Conference: Atlantic Coast Conference
- Record: 7–6 (4–4 ACC)
- Head coach: Dabo Swinney (17th full, 18th overall season)
- Offensive coordinator: Garrett Riley (3rd season)
- Co-offensive coordinators: Kyle Richardson (1st season); Matt Luke (2nd season)
- Offensive scheme: Dirt raid
- Defensive coordinator: Tom Allen (1st season)
- Co-defensive coordinator: Nick Eason (1st season)
- Base defense: 4–2–5
- Home stadium: Memorial Stadium

Uniform
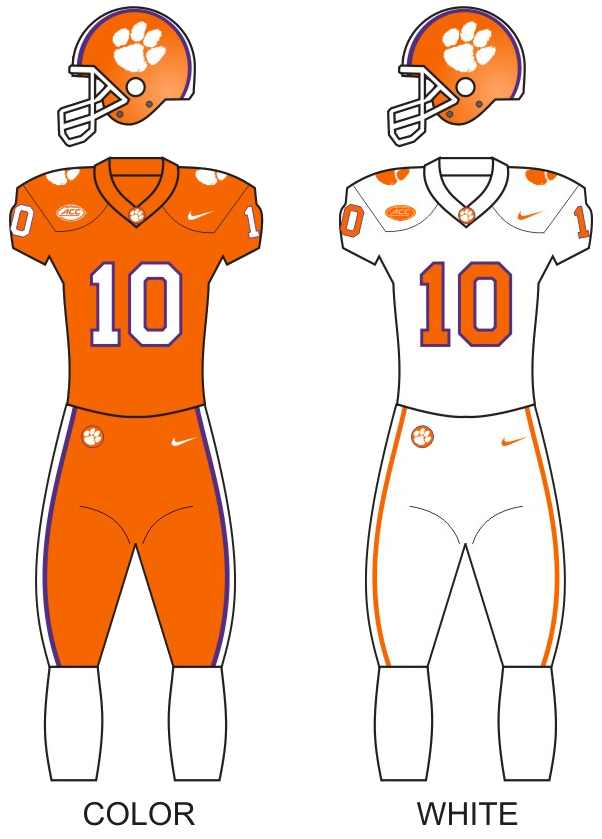

2025 Atlantic Coast Conference football standings
	Conf.			Overall
Team	W		L	W		L
No. 16 Virginia y	7	–	1	11	–	3
Duke y$	6	–	2	9	–	5
No. 2 Miami (FL) ^	6	–	2	13	–	3
Georgia Tech	6	–	2	9	–	4
SMU	6	–	2	9	–	4
Pittsburgh	6	–	2	8	–	5
Louisville	4	–	4	9	–	4
Wake Forest	4	–	4	9	–	4
NC State	4	–	4	8	–	5
California	4	–	4	7	–	6
Clemson	4	–	4	7	–	6
Stanford	3	–	5	4	–	8
Florida State	2	–	6	5	–	7
Virginia Tech	2	–	6	3	–	9
North Carolina	2	–	6	4	–	8
Boston College	1	–	7	2	–	10
Syracuse	1	–	7	3	–	9
Championship: Duke 27, Virginia 20^{OT}
^ – College Football Playoff participant; $ – Conference champion; y – Championship game participant; As of November 7, 2026; Rankings from AP Poll

The 2025 Clemson Tigers football team represented Clemson University as a member of the Atlantic Coast Conference (ACC) during the 2025 NCAA Division I FBS football season. The Tigers were led by Dabo Swinney, in his 18th year and 17th full season as Clemson's head coach. The Tigers played their home games at Memorial Stadium located in Clemson, South Carolina.

The Tigers began the season ranked 4th in the AP poll, and started their season with a game against 9th-ranked LSU. Clemson would lose the game, at home, 10–17. They would defeat Troy before losing to rival Georgia Tech and Syracuse. This was Clemson's worst start to a season since 2004, where Clemson also started 1–3. The Tigers won their next two games, both on the road, against North Carolina and Boston College. However, they could not continue their streak, losing home games against SMU and their homecoming game against Duke. This was their first home loss to Duke since 1980.

The Tigers turned the season around after those losses by going on a four game winning streak. The streak included wins over rivals Florida State and South Carolina, and a road win over 20th-ranked Louisville. Clemson finished the regular season 7–5 and earned an invitation to the Pinstripe Bowl. The team lost 10–22 against Penn State to end their season. Clemson lost 5 regular season games for the first time since 2010. Four of those losses came at home. Their seven wins were also their lowest since 2010.

The Clemson Tigers drew an average home attendance of 79,142.

== Schedule ==
Date	Time	Opponent	Rank	Site	TV	Result	Attendance
August 30	7:30 p.m.	No. 9 LSU*	No. 4	Memorial Stadium; Clemson, SC	ABC	L 10–17	81,500
September 6	3:30 p.m.	Troy*	No. 8	Memorial Stadium; Clemson, SC	ACCN	W 27–16	77,890
September 13	12:00 p.m.	at Georgia Tech	No. 12	Bobby Dodd Stadium; Atlanta, GA (rivalry)	ESPN	L 21–24	48,059
September 20	12:00 p.m.	Syracuse		Memorial Stadium; Clemson, SC	ESPN	L 21–34	80,225
October 4	12:00 p.m.	at North Carolina		Kenan Stadium; Chapel Hill, NC	ESPN	W 38–10	50,500
October 11	7:30 p.m.	at Boston College		Alumni Stadium; Chestnut Hill, MA (O'Rourke–McFadden Trophy)	ACCN	W 41–10	42,265
October 18	3:30 p.m.	SMU		Memorial Stadium; Clemson, SC	ACCN	L 24–35	78,669
November 1	12:00 p.m.	Duke^{†}		Memorial Stadium; Clemson, SC	ACCN	L 45–46	75,809
November 8	7:00 p.m.	Florida State		Memorial Stadium; Clemson, SC (rivalry)	ACCN	W 24–10	81,500
November 14	7:30 p.m.	at No. 20 Louisville		L&N Federal Credit Union Stadium; Louisville, KY	ESPN	W 20–19	51,234
November 22	4:30 p.m.	Furman*		Memorial Stadium; Clemson, SC	CW	W 45–10	78,403
November 29	12:00 p.m.	at South Carolina*		Williams–Brice Stadium; Columbia, SC (Palmetto Bowl)	SECN	W 28–14	79,827
December 27	12:00 p.m.	vs. Penn State*		Yankee Stadium; Bronx, NY (Pinstripe Bowl)	ABC	L 10–22	41,101
*Non-conference game; ^{†}Homecoming; Rankings from AP Poll (and CFP Rankings, after November 4) - Released prior to game; All times are in Eastern time

== Rankings ==
Ranking movements Legend: ██ Increase in ranking ██ Decrease in ranking — = Not ranked RV = Received votes ( ) = First-place votes
	Week																
Poll	Pre	1	2	3	4	5	6	7	8	9	10	11	12	13	14	15	Final
AP	4 (4)	8	12	RV	—	—	—	—	—	—	—	—	—	—	—	—	—
Coaches	6 (2)	8	11	RV	—	—	—	RV	—	—	—	—	—	—	—	—	—
CFP	Not released										—	—	—	—	—	—	Not released

== Game summaries ==
=== vs No. 9 LSU ===
No. 9 LSU Tigers (0–0) at No. 4 Clemson Tigers (0–0) – Game summary

Quarter	1	2	3	4	Total
No. 9 LSU	0	3	7	7	17
No. 4 Clemson	3	7	0	0	10

at Memorial Stadium • Clemson, SC

- Date: August 30
- Game time: 7:30 p.m. EDT
- Game weather: Temperature: 77 °F (25 °C) • Wind: SE 5 mph • Weather: Sunny
- Game attendance: 81,500
- Referee: Daniel Gautreaux
- TV announcers (ABC): Chris Fowler (play-by-play), Kirk Herbstreit (analyst), Holly Rowe, and Molly McGrath (sideline reporters)

Game information

First quarter

- CLEM – Nolan Hauser 42-yard field goal, 8:57. Clemson 3–0. Drive: 4 plays, 0 yards, 0:54.

Second quarter

- LSU – Damian Ramos 52-yard field goal, 10:53. Tied 3–3. Drive: 8 plays, 49 yards, 4:47.
- CLEM – Adam Randall 1-yard run (Nolan Hauser kick), 4:36. Clemson 10–3. Drive: 13 plays, 75 yards, 6:17.

Third quarter

- LSU – Caden Durham 2-yard run (Damian Ramos kick), 8:59. Tied 10–10. Drive: 8 plays, 69 yards, 3:48.

Fourth quarter

- LSU – Trey'Dez Green 8-yard pass from Garrett Nussmeier (Damian Ramos kick), 12:18. LSU 17–10. Drive: 11 plays, 73 yards, 5:51.

Statistics	LSU	CLEM
First downs	25	13
Plays–yards	70–354	58–261
Rushes–yards	31–108	20–31
Passing yards	248	230
Passing: comp–att–int	29–39–0	19–38–1
Turnovers	2	1
Time of possession	37:10	22:50

Team	Category	Player	Statistics
LSU	Passing	Garrett Nussmeier	28/38, 238 yards, TD
LSU	Rushing	Caden Durham	17 carries, 74 yards, TD
LSU	Receiving	Aaron Anderson	6 receptions, 99 yards
Clemson	Passing	Cade Klubnik	19/38, 230 yards, INT
Clemson	Rushing	Adam Randall	5 carries, 16 yards, TD
Clemson	Receiving	Bryant Wesco Jr.	4 receptions, 66 yards

=== vs Troy ===
Troy Trojans (1–0) at No. 8 Clemson Tigers (0–1) – Game summary

Quarter	1	2	3	4	Total
Trojans	7	9	0	0	16
No. 8 Tigers	0	3	17	7	27

at Memorial Stadium • Clemson, SC

- Date: September 6
- Game time: 3:30 p.m. EDT
- Game weather: Sunny
- Game attendance: 77,890
- Referee: Tim Hedgepeth
- TV announcers (ACCN): Chris Cotter (play-by-play), Max Browne (analyst), and Madison Fitzpatrick (sideline reporter)

Game information

First quarter

- (12:06) TROY – Tray Taylor 44-yard pass from Goose Crowder, Scott Taylor Renfroe kick (Drive: 5 plays, 75 yards, 2:54; Troy 7–0)

Second quarter

- (12:38) TROY – Scott Taylor Renfroe 37-yard field goal (Drive: 7 plays, 13 yards, 2:24; Troy 10–0)
- (6:58) TROY – TJ Thompson 4-yard interception return, Scott Taylor Renfroe missed PAT (Drive: 1 play, 4 yards, 0:07; Troy 16–0)
- (4:11) CLEM – Nolan Hauser 25-yard field goal (Drive: 7 plays, 57 yards, 2:41; Troy 16–3)

Third quarter

- (11:05) CLEM – Adam Randall 1-yard run, Nolan Hauser kick (Drive: 8 plays, 75 yards, 3:55; Troy 16–10)
- (10:07) CLEM – Bryant Wesco Jr. 26-yard pass from Cade Klubnik, Nolan Hauser kick (Drive: 1 play, 26 yards, 0:06; Clemson 17–16)
- (5:54) CLEM – Nolan Hauser 30-yard field goal (Drive: 6 plays, 16 yards, 3:14; Clemson 20–16)

Fourth quarter

- (9:41) CLEM – Bryant Wesco Jr. 34-yard pass from Cade Klubnik, Nolan Hauser kick (Drive: 7 plays, 66 yards, 2:32; Clemson 27–16)

Statistics	TROY	CLEM
First downs	16	17
Plays–yards	63–301	55–316
Rushes–yards	32–78	31–120
Passing yards	223	196
Passing: comp–att–int	19–31–3	18–24–1
Turnovers	3	2
Time of possession	33:01	26:59

Team	Category	Player	Statistics
Troy	Passing	Goose Crowder	19/31, 223 yards, TD, 3 INT
Troy	Rushing	Tae Meadows	16 carries, 76 yards
Troy	Receiving	Tray Taylor	4 receptions, 69 yards, TD
Clemson	Passing	Cade Klubnik	18/24, 196 yards, 2 TD, INT
Clemson	Rushing	Adam Randall	21 carries, 112 yards, TD
Clemson	Receiving	Bryant Wesco Jr.	7 receptions, 118 yards, 2 TD

=== at Georgia Tech (rivalry) ===
No. 12 Clemson Tigers (1–1) at Georgia Tech Yellow Jackets (2–0) – Game summary

Quarter	1	2	3	4	Total
No. 12 Tigers	0	7	7	7	21
Yellow Jackets	3	10	0	11	24

at Bobby Dodd Stadium • Atlanta, GA

- Date: September 13
- Game time: 12:00 p.m. EDT
- Game weather: Temperature: 79 °F (26 °C) • Wind: NE 4 mph • Weather: Sunny
- Game attendance: 48,059
- Referee: Adam Savoie
- TV announcers (ESPN): Bob Wischusen (play-by-play), Louis Riddick (analyst), and Kris Budden (sideline)

Game information

First quarter

- (05:50) GT – Aidan Birr 40-yard field goal (Drive: 4 plays, 7 yards, 1:34; GT 3–0)

Second quarter

- (14:55) GT – Jamal Haynes 5-yard run, Aidan Birr kick (Drive: 5 plays, 65 yards, 1:45; GT 10–0)
- (07:46) GT – Aidan Birr 42-yard field goal (Drive: 10 plays, 46 yards, 5:36; GT 13–0)
- (00:49) CLEM – Cade Klubnik 2-yard run, Nolan Hauser kick (Drive: 16 plays, 75 yards, 6:57; GT 13–7)

Third quarter

- (09:36) CLEM – Bryant Wesco Jr. 76-yard pass from Cade Klubnik, Nolan Hauser kick (Drive: 2 plays, 76 yards, 0:51; CLEM 14–13)

Fourth quarter

- (10:02) GT – Haynes King 1-yard run, Dean Patterson pass from Malik Rutherford for 2-pt (Drive: 13 plays, 90 yards, 6:15; GT 21–14)
- (03:26) CLEM – Adam Randall 2-yard run, Nolan Hauser Hauser kick (Drive: 13 plays, 75 yards, 6:36; Tie 21–21)
- (00:00) GT – Aidan Birr 55-yard field goal (Drive: 10 plays, 38 yards, 3:26; GT 24–21)

Statistics	CLEM	GT
First downs	17	18
Plays–yards	61–381	70–358
Rushes–yards	35–174	42–147
Passing yards	207	211
Passing: comp–att–int	15–26–1	20–28–0
Turnovers	2	0
Time of possession	27:55	32:05

Team	Category	Player	Statistics
Clemson	Passing	Cade Klubnik	15/26, 207 yards, TD, INT
Clemson	Rushing	Adam Randall	15 carries, 80 yards, TD
Clemson	Receiving	Bryant Wesco Jr.	7 receptions, 126 yards, TD
Georgia Tech	Passing	Haynes King	20/28, 211 yards
Georgia Tech	Rushing	Haynes King	25 carries, 103 yards, TD
Georgia Tech	Receiving	Isiah Canion	5 receptions, 56 yards

=== vs Syracuse ===
Syracuse Orange (2–1) at Clemson Tigers (1–2) – Game summary

Quarter	1	2	3	4	Total
Orange	10	14	10	0	34
Tigers	7	7	0	7	21

at Memorial Stadium • Clemson, SC

- Date: September 20
- Game time: 12:00 p.m. EDT
- Game weather: Temperature: 82 °F (28 °C) • Wind: NE 2 mph • Weather: Sunny
- Game attendance: 80,225
- Referee: Mike Roche
- TV announcers (ESPN): Bob Wischusen (play-by-play), Louis Riddick (analyst), and Kris Budden (sideline)

Game information

First quarter

- (11:01) SYR – Justus Ross-Simmons 12-yard pass from Steve Angeli, Tripp Woody kick (Drive: 7 plays, 75 yards, 3:59; SYR 7–0)
- (07:40) SYR – Tripp Woody 23-yard field goal (Drive: 11 plays, 49 yards, 3:20; SYR 10–0)
- (03:21) CLEM – Bryant Wesco Jr. 38-yard pass from Cade Klubnik, Nolan Hauser kick (Drive: 9 plays, 75 yards, 4:19; SYR 10–7)

Second quarter

- (14:56) SYR – Will Nixon 9-yard run, Tripp Woody kick (Drive: 9 plays, 75 yards, 3:25; SYR 17–7)
- (09:13) SYR – Darrell Gill Jr. 22-yard pass from Steve Angeli, Tripp Woody kick (Drive: 8 plays, 80 yards, 3:39; SYR 24–7)
- (01:06) CLEM – Adam Randall 6-yard pass from Cade Klubnik, Nolan Hauser kick (Drive: 13 plays, 92 yards, 4:06; SYR 24–14)

Third quarter

- (11:42) SYR – Tripp Woody 49-yard field goal (Drive: 6 plays, 58 yards, 1:20; SYR 27–14)
- (02:12) SYR – Justus Ross-Simmons 18-yard pass from Rickie Collins, Tripp Woody kick (Drive: 1 plays, 18 yards, 0:06; SYR 34–14)

Fourth quarter

- (09:00) CLEM – Bryant Wesco Jr. 9-yard pass from Cade Klubnik, Nolan Hauser kick (Drive: 9 plays, 81 yards, 3:09; SYR 34–21)

Statistics	SYR	CLEM
First downs	24	29
Plays–yards	77–433	83–503
Rushes–yards	38–155	22–140
Passing yards	278	363
Passing: comp–att–int	21–39–0	37–61–1
Turnovers	0	1
Time of possession	30:40	29:20

Team	Category	Player	Statistics
Syracuse	Passing	Steve Angeli	18/31, 344 yards, 2 TD
Syracuse	Rushing	Yasin Willis	18 carries, 94 yards
Syracuse	Receiving	Johntay Cook II	6 receptions, 113 yards
Clemson	Passing	Cade Klubnik	37/60, 363 yards, 3 TD, INT
Clemson	Rushing	Adam Randall	16 carries, 130 yards
Clemson	Receiving	T. J. Moore	8 receptions, 92 yards

=== at North Carolina ===
Clemson Tigers (1–3) at North Carolina Tar Heels (2–2) – Game summary

Quarter	1	2	3	4	Total
Tigers	28	7	0	3	38
Tar Heels	3	0	0	7	10

at Kenan Stadium • Chapel Hill, NC

- Date: October 4
- Game time: 12:00 p.m. EDT
- Game weather: Temperature: 71 °F (22 °C) • Wind: NE 5 mph • Weather: Sunny
- Game attendance: 50,500
- Referee: Adam Savoie
- TV announcers (ESPN): Mark Jones (play-by-play), Roddy Jones (analyst) and Quint Kessenich (sideline)

Game information

First quarter

- (14:49) CLEM – T. J. Moore 75-yard pass from Antonio Williams, Nolan Hauser kick (Drive: 1 play, 75 yards, 0:11; CLEM 7–0)
- (10:02) UNC – Rece Verhoff 35-yard field goal (Drive: 10 plays, 58 yards, 4:39; CLEM 7–3)
- (08:54) CLEM – Adam Randall 35-yard pass from Cade Klubnik, Nolan Hauser kick (Drive: 3 plays, 75 yards, 1:08; CLEM 14–3)
- (04:15) CLEM – Christian Bentancur 45-yard pass from Cade Klubnik, Nolan Hauser kick (Drive: 5 plays, 57 yards, 2:48; CLEM 21–3)
- (00:01) CLEM – Adam Randall 23-yard pass from Cade Klubnik, Nolan Hauser kick (Drive: 7 plays, 46 yards, 2:54; CLEM 28–3)

Second quarter

- (2:02) CLEM – Christian Bentancur 8-yard pass from Cade Klubnik, Nolan Hauser kick (Drive: 6 plays, 37 yards, 3:16; CLEM 35–3)

Third quarter

- No scoring plays.

Fourth quarter

- (13:20) CLEM – Nolan Hauser 27-yard field goal (Drive: 14 plays, 55 yards, 5:20; CLEM 38–3)
- (10:25) UNC – Benjamin Hall 11-yard run, Rece Verhoff kick (Drive: 5 plays, 75 yards, 2:55; CLEM 38–10)

Statistics	CLEM	UNC
First downs	23	19
Plays–yards	70–488	60–270
Rushes–yards	31–89	18–57
Passing yards	399	213
Passing: comp–att–int	30–39–0	26–42–0
Turnovers	0	0
Time of possession	32:25	27:35

Team	Category	Player	Statistics
Clemson	Passing	Cade Klubnik	22/24, 254 yards, 4 TD
Clemson	Rushing	Adam Randall	8 carries, 30 yards
Clemson	Receiving	T. J. Moore	5 receptions, 108 yards, TD
North Carolina	Passing	Max Johnson	26/42, 21 yards
North Carolina	Rushing	Benjamin Hall	5 carries, 24 yards, TD
North Carolina	Receiving	Jordan Shipp	5 receptions, 41 yards

=== at Boston College (O'Rourke–McFadden Trophy) ===
Clemson Tigers (2–3) at Boston College Eagles (1–4) – Game summary

Quarter	1	2	3	4	Total
Tigers	10	24	0	7	41
Eagles	3	7	0	0	10

at Alumni Stadium • Chestnut Hill, MA

- Date: October 11
- Game time: 7:30 p.m. EDT
- Game weather: Temperature: 65 °F (18 °C) • Wind: Calm • Weather: Sunny
- Game attendance: 42,265
- Referee: Justin Elliot
- TV announcers (ACCN): Chris Cotter (play-by-play), Forrest Conoly (analyst), and Kendra Douglas (sideline)

Game information

First quarter

- (08:24) CLEM – Nolan Hauser 46-yard field goal (Drive: 13 plays, 42 yards, 6:31; CLEM 3–0)
- (04:05) CLEM – Adam Randall 8-yard run, Nolan Hauser kick (Drive: 6 plays, 67 yards, 3:04; CLEM 10–0)
- (01:37) BC – Luca Lombardo 45-yard field goal (Drive: 7 plays, 48 yards, 2:28; CLEM 10–3)

Second quarter

- (13:05) CLEM – Peter Woods 2-yard run, Nolan Hauser kick (Drive: 8 plays, 75 yards, 3:32; CLEM 17–3)
- (09:10) BC – Turbo Richard 2-yard run, Luca Lombardo kick (Drive: 10 plays, 75 yards, 3:55; CLEM 17–10)
- (05:31) CLEM – Cade Klubnik 6-yard run, Nolan Hauser kick (Drive: 9 plays, 68 yards, 3:33; CLEM 24–10)
- (01:23) CLEM – Bryant Wesco Jr. 38-yard pass from Cade Klubnik, Nolan Hauser kick (Drive: 3 plays, 70 yards, 0:31; CLEM 31–10)
- (00:00) CLEM – Nolan Hauser 50-yard field goal (Drive: 3 plays, 11 yards, 0:12; CLEM 34–10)

Third quarter

- No scoring plays.

Fourth quarter

- (00:24) CLEM – Keith Adams Jr. 1-yard run, Nolan Hauser kick (Drive: 10 plays, 60 yards, 5:02; CLEM 41–10)

Statistics	CLEM	BC
First downs	28	15
Plays–yards	76–504	61–221
Rushes–yards	43–226	32–85
Passing yards	278	136
Passing: comp–att–int	23–33–2	15–29–1
Turnovers	2	1
Time of possession	37:21	22:39

Team	Category	Player	Statistics
Clemson	Passing	Cade Klubnik	22/30, 280 yards, TD, INT
Clemson	Rushing	Keith Adams Jr.	7 carries, 49 yards
Clemson	Receiving	Bryant Wesco Jr.	5 receptions, 106 yards, TD
Boston College	Passing	Dylan Lonergan	12/19, 117 yards
Boston College	Rushing	Turbo Richard	18 carries, 75 yards, TD
Boston College	Receiving	Lewis Bond	7 receptions, 70 yards

=== vs SMU ===
SMU Mustangs (4–2) at Clemson Tigers (3–3) – Game summary

Quarter	1	2	3	4	Total
Mustangs	7	9	7	12	35
Tigers	0	7	10	7	24

at Memorial Stadium • Clemson, SC

- Date: October 18
- Game time: 3:30 p.m. EDT
- Game weather: Temperature: 79 °F (26 °C) • Wind: SW @ 8 mph • Weather: Sunny
- Game attendance: 78,669
- Referee: Mike Roche
- TV announcers (ACCN): Wes Durham (play-by-play), Steve Addazio (color), and Dana Boyle (sideline)

Game information

First quarter

- (03:52) SMU – Jordan Hudson 70-yard pass from Kevin Jennings, Sam Keltner kick (Drive: 1 play, 70 yards, 0:09; SMU 7–0)

Second quarter

- (11:26) SMU – Sam Keltner 51-yard field goal (Drive: 10 plays, 33 yards, 3:38; SMU 10–0)
- (08:51) CLEM – T. J. Moore 32-yard pass from Christopher Vizzina, Nolan Hauser kick (Drive: 6 plays, 75 yards, 2:35; SMU 10–7)
- (04:29) SMU – Sam Keltner 48-yard field goal (Drive: 10 plays, 44 yards, 4:22; SMU 13–7)
- (01:09) SMU – Sam Keltner 48-yard field goal (Drive: 10 plays, 33 yards, 1:44; SMU 16–7)

Third quarter

- (08:48) CLEM – T.J. Moore 62-yard pass from Christopher Vizzina, Nolan Hauser kick (Drive: 4 plays, 74 yards, 1:23; SMU 16–14)
- (07:29) SMU – Derrick McFall 35-yard run, Sam Keltner kick (Drive: 4 plays, 75 yards, 1:19; SMU 23–14)
- (00:07) CLEM – Nolan Hauser 28-yard field goal (Drive: 17 plays, 65 yards, 7:21; SMU 23–17)

Fourth quarter

- (12:30) SMU – Matthew Hibner 22-yard pass from Kevin Jennings, Sam Keltner kick failed (Drive: 6 play, 75 yards, 2:37; SMU 29–17)
- (06:44) CLEM – Tristan Smith 23-yard pass from Christopher Vizzina, Nolan Hauser kick (Drive: 8 plays, 49 yards, 3:27; SMU 29–24)
- (01:03) SMU – Chris Johnson Jr. 6-yard run, 2-point pass failed (Drive: 13 plays, 75 yards, 5:41; SMU 35–24)

Statistics	SMU	CLEM
First downs	21	20
Plays–yards	71–429	72–352
Rushes–yards	28–139	30–35
Passing yards	290	317
Passing: comp–att–int	23–43–1	29–42–0
Turnovers	1	0
Time of possession	28:45	31:15

Team	Category	Player	Statistics
SMU	Passing	Kevin Jennings	23/43, 290 yards, 2 TD, INT
SMU	Rushing	Chris Johnson Jr.	6 carries, 59 yards, TD
SMU	Receiving	Jordan Hudson	7 receptions, 131 yards, TD
Clemson	Passing	Christopher Vizzina	29/42, 317 yards, 3 TD
Clemson	Rushing	Adam Randall	10 carries, 29 yards
Clemson	Receiving	T. J. Moore	5 receptions, 124 yards, 2 TD

=== vs Duke ===
Duke Blue Devils (4–3) at Clemson Tigers (3–4) – Game summary

Quarter	1	2	3	4	Total
Blue Devils	21	7	7	11	46
Tigers	7	21	10	7	45

at Memorial Stadium • Clemson, SC

- Date: November 1
- Game time: 12:00 p.m. EDT
- Game weather: Temperature: 56 °F (13 °C) • Wind: SW @ 1 mph • Weather: Sunny
- Game attendance: 75,809
- Referee: Tim Hedgepeth
- TV announcers (ACCN): Wes Durham (play-by-play), Steve Addazio (color), and Dana Boyle (sideline)

Game information

First quarter

- (10:08) DUKE – Que'Sean Brown 19-yard pass from Darian Mensah, Todd Pelino kick (Drive: 9 plays, 53 yards, 2:05; DUKE 7–0)
- (06:25) CLEM – Antonio Williams 5-yard run, Nolan Hauser kick (Drive: 6 plays, 75 yards, 3:43; Tied 7–7)
- (05:33) DUKE – Cooper Barkate 77-yard pass from Darian Mensah, Todd Pelino kick (Drive: 2 plays, 79 yards, 0:34; DUKE 14–7)
- (10:08) DUKE – Andrel Anthony 20-yard pass from Darian Mensah, Todd Pelino kick (Drive: 10 plays, 72 yards, 4:24; DUKE 21–7)

Second quarter

- (06:25) CLEM – Antonio Williams 4-yard pass from Cade Klubnik, Nolan Hauser kick (Drive: 10 plays, 75 yards, 4:39; DUKE 21–14)
- (06:25) CLEM – Adam Randall 2-yard run, Nolan Hauser kick (Drive: 7 plays, 68 yards, 2:39; Tied 21–21)
- (06:25) CLEM – Adam Randall 2-yard run, Nolan Hauser kick (Drive: 10 plays, 77 yards, 3:30; CLEM 28–21)
- (00:11) DUKE – Que'Sean Brown 43-yard pass from Darian Mensah, Todd Pelino kick (Drive: 7 plays, 75 yards, 0:50; Tied 28–28)

Third quarter

- (08:25) CLEM – Peter Woods 1-yard run, Nolan Hauser kick (Drive: 7 plays, 50 yards, 4:03; CLEM 35–28)
- (08:13) DUKE – Sahmir Hagans 100-yard kickoff return, Todd Pelino kick (Drive: N/A; Tied 35–35)
- (00:14) CLEM – Nolan Hauser 22-yard field goal (Drive: 15 plays, 71 yards, 7:59; CLEM 38–35)

Fourth quarter

- (10:40) DUKE – Todd Pelino 37-yard field goal (Drive: 12 plays, 55 yards, 4:34; Tied 38–38)
- (10:28) CLEM – T. J. Moore 75-yard pass from Cade Klubnik, Nolan Hauser kick (Drive: 1 play, 75 yards, 0:12; CLEM 45–38)
- (00:40) DUKE – Nate Sheppard 3-yard run, Sahmir Hagans pass from Darian Mensah for 2 pt conversion (Drive: 11 plays, 94 yards, 4:39; DUKE 46–45)

Statistics	DUKE	CLEM
First downs	22	28
Plays–yards	64–439	72–560
Rushes–yards	22–78	36–175
Passing yards	361	385
Passing: comp–att–int	27–42–0	27–36–0
Turnovers	0	0
Time of possession	25:35	34:26

Team	Category	Player	Statistics
Duke	Passing	Darian Mensah	27/41, 361 yards, 4 TD
Duke	Rushing	Nate Sheppard	13 carries, 60 yards, TD
Duke	Receiving	Cooper Barkate	6 receptions, 127 yards, TD
Clemson	Passing	Cade Klubnik	27/36, 385 yards, 2 TD
Clemson	Rushing	Adam Randall	16 carries, 89 yards, 2 TD
Clemson	Receiving	Antonio Williams	10 receptions, 142 yards, TD

=== vs Florida State (rivalry) ===
Florida State Seminoles (4–4) at Clemson Tigers (3–5) – Game summary

Quarter	1	2	3	4	Total
Seminoles	0	7	0	3	10
Tigers	8	10	3	3	24

at Memorial Stadium • Clemson, SC

- Date: November 8
- Game time: 7:00 p.m. EST
- Game weather: 64 °F (18 °C) • Wind: SW @ 4 mph • Weather: Sunny
- Game attendance: 81,500
- Referee: Adam Savoie
- TV announcers (ACCN): Wes Durham (play-by-play), Steve Addazio (color), and Dana Boyle (sideline)

Game information

First quarter

- (08:25) CLEM – Cade Klubnik 4-yard run, Clay Swinney run (Drive: 13 plays, 75 yards, 6:35; CLEM 8–0)

Second quarter

- (12:01) CLEM – Antonio Williams 4-yard pass from Cade Klubnik, Nolan Hauser kick (Drive: 2 plays, 39 yards, 0:41; CLEM 15–0)
- (02:31) CLEM – Nolan Hauser 40-yard field goal (Drive: 13 plays, 74 yards, 7:31; CLEM 18–0)
- (00:33) FSU – Lawayne McCoy 7-yard pass from Thomas Castellanos, Jake Weinberg kick (Drive: 10 plays, 75 yards, 1:58; CLEM 18–7)

Third quarter

- (06:01) CLEM – Nolan Hauser 23-yard field goal (Drive: 10 plays, 73 yards, 5:05; CLEM 21–7)

Fourth quarter

- (14:18) CLEM – Nolan Hauser 43-yard field goal (Drive: 9 plays, 28 yards, 4:56; CLEM 24–7)
- (07:37) FSU – Jake Weinberg 46-yard field goal (Drive: 13 plays, 47 yards, 6:41; CLEM 24–10)

Statistics	FSU	CLEM
First downs	19	16
Plays–yards	69–360	63–319
Rushes–yards	26–110	36–98
Passing yards	250	221
Passing: comp–att–int	23–43–1	20–27–0
Turnovers	1	0
Time of possession	25:38	34:22

Team	Category	Player	Statistics
Florida State	Passing	Tommy Castellanos	23/43, 250 yards, TD, INT
Florida State	Rushing	Tommy Castellanos	11 carries, 31 yards
Florida State	Receiving	Duce Robinson	9 receptions, 124 yards
Clemson	Passing	Cade Klubnik	20/27, 221 yards, TD
Clemson	Rushing	Adam Randall	15 carries, 48 yards
Clemson	Receiving	Antonio Williams	6 receptions, 62 yards, TD

=== at No. 20 Louisville ===
Clemson Tigers (4–5) at No. 20 Louisville Cardinals (7–2) – Game summary

Quarter	1	2	3	4	Total
Tigers	3	7	3	7	20
No. 20 Cardinals	3	6	10	0	19

at L&N Federal Credit Union Stadium • Louisville, KY

- Date: November 14
- Game time: 7:30 p.m. EST
- Game weather: 64 °F (18 °C) • Wind: SW @ 5 mph • Weather: Clear
- Game attendance: 51,234
- Referee: Mike Roche
- TV announcers (ESPN): Anish Shroff (play-by-play), Andre Ware (analyst), and Paul Carcaterra (sideline)

Game information

First quarter

- (08:38) CLEM – Nolan Hauser 27-yard field goal (Drive: 12 plays, 65 yards, 6:22; CLEM 3–0)
- (00:45) LOU – Cooper Ranvier 51-yard field goal (Drive: 8 plays, 55 yards, 3:12; Tied 3–3)

Second quarter

- (08:47) LOU – Miller Moss 4-yard run, Cooper Ranvier kick missed (Drive: 3 plays, 38 yards, 1:14; LOU 9–3)
- (03:13) CLEM – Adam Randall 25-yard run, Nolan Hauser kick (Drive: 1 play, 25 yards, 0:07; CLEM 10–9)

Third quarter

- (11:16) LOU – Nate Kurisky 2-yard pass from Caullin Lacy, Cooper Ranvier kick (Drive: 7 plays, 75 yards, 3:44; LOU 16–10)
- (07:07) CLEM – Nolan Hauser 48-yard field goal (Drive: 8 plays, 45 yards, 4:09; LOU 16–13)
- (01:32) LOU – Cooper Ranvier 39-yard field goal (Drive: 10 plays, 54 yards, 5:35; LOU 19–13)

Fourth quarter

- (07:16) CLEM – Adam Randall 1-yard run, Nolan Hauser kick (Drive: 6 plays, 56 yards, 2:08; CLEM 20–19)

Statistics	CLEM	LOU
First downs	19	16
Plays–yards	64–308	56–385
Rushes–yards	30–121	30–171
Passing yards	187	214
Passing: comp–att–int	22–34–0	20–29–0
Turnovers	0	1
Time of possession	30:55	29:05

Team	Category	Player	Statistics
Clemson	Passing	Cade Klubnik	22/34, 187 yards
Clemson	Rushing	Adam Randall	15 carries, 105 yards, 2 TD
Clemson	Receiving	T. J. Moore	6 receptions, 68 yards
Louisville	Passing	Miller Moss	19/27, 212 yards
Louisville	Rushing	Keyjuan Brown	15 carries, 135 yards
Louisville	Receiving	Chris Bell	5 receptions, 79 yards

=== vs Furman (FCS) ===
Furman Paladins (FCS) (5–5) at Clemson Tigers (5–5) – Game summary

Quarter	1	2	3	4	Total
Paladins (FCS)	0	3	7	0	10
Tigers	17	14	0	14	45

at Memorial Stadium • Clemson, SC

- Date: November 22
- Game time: 4:30 p.m. EST
- Game weather: 77 °F (25 °C) • Wind: W @ 10 mph • Weather: Sunny
- Game attendance: 78,403
- Referee: Darryl DeBerry
- TV announcers (The CW): Thom Brennaman (play-by-play), Will Blackmon (analyst) and Wes Bryant (sideline)

Game information

First quarter

- (12:17) CLEM – Nolan Hauser 45-yard field goal, (Drive: 7 plays, 49 yards, 2:43; CLEM 3–0)
- (08:34) CLEM – Antonio Williams 22-yard pass from Cade Klubnik, Nolan Hauser kick, (Drive: 6 plays, 41 yards, 2:29; CLEM 10–0)
- (04:43) CLEM – Tyler Brown 21-yard run, Nolan Hauser kick, (Drive: 5 plays, 80 yards, 2:25; CLEM 17–0)

Second quarter

- (14:15) CLEM – Antonio Williams 35-yard pass from Cade Klubnik, Nolan Hauser kick, (Drive: 2 plays, 46 yards, 0:39; CLEM 24–0)
- (06:48) CLEM – Christian Bentancur 6-yard pass from Christopher Vizzina, Quinn Castner kick, (Drive: 6 plays, 22 yards, 2:11; CLEM 31–0)
- (00:30) FUR – Ian Williams 49-yard field goal, (Drive: 8 plays, 48 yards, 2:16; CLEM 31–3)

Third quarter

- (1:53) FUR – Evan James 19-yard pass from Trey Hedden, Ian Williams kick, (Drive: 6 plays, 55 yards, 4:21; CLEM 31–10)

Fourth quarter

- (07:45) CLEM – Logan Brooking 4-yard pass from Chris Denson, Quinn Castner kick, (Drive: 5 plays, 75 yards, 2:33; CLEM 38–10)
- (00:09) CLEM – Chris Denson 10-yard run, Quinn Castner kick, (Drive: 6 plays, 55 yards, 2:46; CLEM 45–10)

Statistics	FUR	CLEM
First downs	15	23
Plays–yards	70–271	67–456
Rushes–yards	28–66	31–219
Passing yards	205	237
Passing: comp–att–int	25–42–1	23–36–0
Turnovers	1	0
Time of possession	32:07	28:40

Team	Category	Player	Statistics
Furman	Passing	Trey Hedden	22/38, 179 yards, TD, INT
Furman	Rushing	Ben Crosdale	8 carries, 38 yards
Furman	Receiving	Kerry King	6 receptions, 71 yards
Clemson	Passing	Cade Klubnik	9/15, 159 yards, 2 TD
Clemson	Rushing	Chris Denson	6 carries, 106 yards, TD
Clemson	Receiving	Antonio Williams	2 receptions, 57 yards, 2 TD

=== at South Carolina (Palmetto Bowl) ===
Clemson Tigers (6-5) at South Carolina Gamecocks (4-7) – Game summary

Quarter	1	2	3	4	Total
Tigers	0	17	3	8	28
Gamecocks	0	14	0	0	14

at Williams–Brice Stadium • Columbia, SC

- Date: November 29
- Game time: 12:00 p.m. EST
- Game weather: 46 °F (8 °C) • Wind: NE @ 6 mph • Weather: Sunny
- Game attendance: 79,827
- Referee: Jerry Magallanes
- TV announcers (SECN): Taylor Zarzour (play-by-play), Matt Stinchcomb (analyst) and Alyssa Lang (sideline reporter)

Game information

First quarter

- No scoring plays.

Second quarter

- CLEM – Adam Randall 10-yard run (Nolan Hauser kick), 12:37. Tigers 7–0. Drive: 7 plays, 78 yards, 3:37.
- SC – Nyck Harbor 53-yard pass from LaNorris Sellers (William Joyce kick), 11:14. Tied 7–7. Drive: 3 plays, 75 yards, 1:23.
- CLEM – Cade Klubnik 3-yard run (Nolan Hauser kick), 5:48. Tigers 14–7. Drive: 11 plays, 85 yards, 5:20.
- SC – Vandrevius Jacobs 74-yard pass from LaNorris Sellers (William Joyce kick), 5:29. Tied 14–14. Drive: 1 play, 74 yards, 0:13.
- CLEM – Nolan Hauser 32-yard field goal, 0:56. Tigers 17–14. Drive: 12 plays, 61 yards, 4:33.

Third quarter

- CLEM – Nolan Hauser 42-yard field goal, 8:32. Tigers 20–14. Drive: 12 plays, 56 yards, 5:33.

Fourth quarter

- CLEM – Ricardo Jones 12-yard interception return (Cade Klubnik–Adam Randall pass), 3:20. Tigers 28–14.

Statistics	CLEM	SC
First downs	25	17
Plays–yards	79–415	61–422
Rushes–yards	40–147	19–41
Passing yards	268	381
Passing: comp–att–int	24–39–1	23–42–2
Turnovers	1	4
Time of possession	38:44	21:16

Team	Category	Player	Statistics
Clemson	Passing	Cade Klubnik	24/39, 268 yards, INT
Clemson	Rushing	Adam Randall	24 carries, 102 yards, TD
Clemson	Receiving	T. J. Moore	6 receptions, 101 yards
South Carolina	Passing	LaNorris Sellers	23/42, 381 yards, 2 TD, 2 INT
South Carolina	Rushing	Rahsul Faison	5 carries, 37 yards
South Carolina	Receiving	Vandrevius Jacobs	7 receptions, 141 yards, TD

=== vs. Penn State (Pinstripe Bowl) ===
2025 Bad Boy Mowers Pinstripe Bowl
Penn State Nittany Lions (6-6) vs. Clemson Tigers (7-5) – Game summary

Quarter	1	2	3	4	Total
Nittany Lions	3	3	0	16	22
Tigers	0	3	0	7	10

at Yankee Stadium • Bronx, NY

- Date: December 27
- Game time: 12:00 p.m. EST
- Game weather: Cloudy • Temperature: 28 °F (−2 °C) • Wind: 8 mph NE
- Game attendance: 41,101
- Referee: David Alvarez
- TV announcers (ABC): Dave Pasch (play-by-play), Dusty Dvoracek (analyst), and Taylor McGregor (sideline reporter)

Game information

First quarter

- (8:32) PSU – Ryan Barker 22-yard field goal (Drive: 10 plays, 27 yards, 5:08; PSU 3–0)

Second quarter

- (0:56) CLEM – Nolan Hauser 48-yard field goal (Drive: 10 plays, 29 yards, 2:46; Tied 3–3)
- (0:00) PSU – Ryan Barker 48-yard field goal (Drive: 10 plays, 48 yards, 0:52; PSU 6–3)

Third quarter

- No scoring plays.

Fourth quarter

- (14:56) PSU – Ryan Barker 43-yard field goal (Drive: 11 plays, 64 yards, 5:09; PSU 9–3)
- (12:51) PSU – Trebor Peña 73-yard pass from Ethan Grunkemeyer, 2-point conversion run failed (Drive: 3 plays, 75 yards, 00:35; PSU 15–3)
- (08:47) CLEM – Adam Randall 2-yard run, Nolan Hauser kick (Drive: 10 plays, 65 yards, 4:04; PSU 15–10)
- (04:56) PSU – Andrew Rappleyea 11-yard pass from Ethan Grunkemeyer, Ryan Barker kick (Drive: 8 plays, 75 yards, 3:51; PSU 22–10)

Statistics	PSU	CLEM
First downs	20	16
Plays–yards	79–397	67–236
Rushes–yards	41–135	25–43
Passing yards	262	193
Passing: comp–att–int	23–35–0	22–40–0
Turnovers	0	0
Time of possession	31:01	26:59

Team	Category	Player	Statistics
Penn State	Passing	Ethan Grunkemeyer	23/34, 262 yards, 2 TD
Penn State	Rushing	Quinton Martin Jr.	20 carries, 101 yards
Penn State	Receiving	Trebor Pena	5 receptions, 100 yards, TD
Clemson	Passing	Cade Klubnik	22/39, 193 yards
Clemson	Rushing	Adam Randall	11 carries, 35 yards, TD
Clemson	Receiving	T. J. Moore	6 receptions, 83 yards

== Personnel ==
=== Coaching staff ===
Clemson Tigers football current coaching staff
Name	Position	Alma mater	Years at Clemson
Dabo Swinney	Head coach	University of Alabama (1993)	18th
Nick Eason	Associate head coach/co-defensive coordinator/defensive tackles coach	Clemson University (2001)	4th
Matt Luke	Assistant head coach/co-offensive coordinator/offensive linemen coach	Ole Miss (1998)	2nd
Mike Reed	Assistant head coach/co-special teams coordinator/cornerbacks coach	Boston College (1994)	13th
Tom Allen	Assistant coach/defensive coordinator/linebackers coach	Maranatha Baptist University (1992)	1st
Ben Boulware	Assistant coach/linebackers coach	Clemson University (2017)	1st
Mickey Conn	Assistant coach/defensive pass game coordinator/co-special teams coordinator/safeties coach	University of Alabama (1995)	10th
Tyler Grisham	Assistant coach/offensive pass game coordinator/wide receivers coach	Clemson University (2009)	6th
Kyle Richardson	Assistant coach/co-offensive coordinator/tight ends coach	Appalachian State University (2001)	10th
Garrett Riley	Assistant coach/offensive coordinator/quarterbacks coach	Texas Tech (2012)	3rd
Chris Rumph	Assistant coach/defensive run game coordinator/defensive ends coach	University of South Carolina (1996)	2nd
C. J. Spiller	Assistant coach/offensive run game coordinator/running backs coach	Clemson University (2009)	5th

=== Roster ===
As of June 30, 2025

2025 Clemson Tigers Football
Quarterbacks: 2 Cade Klubnik – senior (6'2, 210); 10 Cade Trotter – (redshirt) freshman (6'2, 185); 14 Trent Pearman – (redshirt) junior (6'0, 200); 15 Chris Denson – freshman (6'2, 185); 16 Ethan Anderson – (redshirt) freshman (6'1, 190); 17 Christopher Vizzina – (redshirt) sophomore (6'4, 210); Running backs: 8 Adam Randall – graduate student (6'2, 225); 3 Marquise Henderson – freshman (5'10, 170); 9 Gideon Davidson – freshman (5'11, 185); 19 Keith Adams Jr. – (redshirt) junior (5'9, 215); 21 Jarvis Green – (redshirt) sophomore (5'9, 200); 23 Peyton Streko – (redshirt) sophomore (5'10, 180); 24 David Eziomume – (redshirt) freshman (6'0, 210); 26 Jay Haynes – (redshirt) sophomore (5'11, 195); 34 Max Wilson – (redshirt) freshman (5'10, 195); Wide receivers: 0 Antonio Williams – (redshirt) junior (5'11, 190); 1 T. J. Moore – sophomore (6'3, 200); 3 Tristan Smith – senior (6'5, 205); 6 Tyler Brown – (redshirt) sophomore (5'11, 180); 10 Juju Preston – freshman (6'0, 175); 12 Bryant Wesco – sophomore (6'2, 180); 13 Parker Fulghum – (redshirt) freshman (6'0, 205); 18 Misun Kelley – WR/DB – (redshirt) sophomore (5'9, 190); 20 Clark Sanderson – (redshirt) freshman (5'9, 170); 22 Cole Turner – (redshirt) junior (6'1, 185); 27 Jack Purkerson – (redshirt) junior (5'7, 170); 29 Chase Byrd – (redshirt) freshman (5'10, 185); 80 Luke Stubbs – (redshirt) junior (6'2, 205); 82 Sam Earle – (redshirt) freshman (5'10, 165); 84 Avery Wieting – (redshirt) freshman (5'9, 175); 85 Charlie Johnson – (redshirt) sophomore (6'4, 215); 88 Clay Swinney – (redshirt) junior (5'10, 180); Tight ends: 5 Josh Sapp – (redshirt) junior (6'1, 225); 7 Logan Brooking – freshman (6'4, 235); 11 Olsen Patt-Henry – junior (6'3, 240); 18 Ian Schieffelin – graduate student (6'8, 240); 44 Banks Pope – (redshirt) senior (6'4, 250); 84 Markus Dixon – (redshirt) sophomore (6'4, 245); 87 Christian Bentancur – (redshirt) freshman (6'4, 245); Placekickers: 36 Quinn Castner – graduate student (5'5, 150); 38 Robert Gunn III – (redshirt) junior (6'0, 180); 48 Charlie Reed – PK/P – (redshirt) freshman (6'2, 205); 81 Nolan Hauser – sophomore (6'1, 190)	Offensive linemen: 50 Collin Sadler – (redshirt) junior (6'6, 310); 51 Gavin Blanchard – freshman (6'3, 300); 52 Elyjah Thurmon – sophomore (6'4, 310); 53 Ryan Linthicum – C – graduate student (6'3, 305); 54 Ian Reed – (redshirt) sophomore (6'6, 305); 55 Harris Sewell – junior (6'4, 310); 56 Watson Young – (redshirt) freshman (6'3, 285); 59 Dietrick Pennington – (redshirt) senior (6'5, 350); 62 Bryce Smith – (redshirt) sophomore (6'3, 285); 63 Easton Ware – freshman (6'5, 285); 64 Walker Parks – graduate student (6'5, 305); 67 Seth Corontzes – (redshirt) freshman (6'2, 295); 71 Tristan Leigh – graduate student (6'6, 315); 72 Rowan Byrne – freshman (6'6, 295); 73 Hayes Galloway – (redshirt) freshman (6'4, 320); 74 Brayden Jacobs – freshman (6'7, 320); 75 Tucker Kattus – freshman (6'5, 305); 76 Mason Wade – (redshirt) freshman (6'5, 300); 77 Ronan O'Connell – (redshirt) freshman (6'5, 310); 78 Blake Miller – senior (6'6, 315); 94 Chapman Pendergrass – (redshirt) junior (6'3, 295); Defensive backs: 5 Ronan Hanafin – junior (6'3, 215); 46 Tyler Conner – (redshirt) sophomore (5'11, 185); Defensive ends: 3 T. J. Parker – junior (6'3, 265); 13 Will Heldt – junior (6'6, 265); 15 Jahiem Lawson – (redshirt) junior (6'2, 250); 34 Armon Mason – (redshirt) senior (6'3, 240); 44 Cade Denhoff – graduate student (6'5, 255); 49 Darien Mayo – (redshirt) freshman (6'7, 265); 58 Aidan Hydrick – (redshirt) freshman (6'0, 240); 91 Zaire Patterson – (redshirt) senior (6'5, 260); 92 Levi Matthews – (redshirt) junior (6'5, 240); 99 Ari Watford – freshman (6'5, 235); Defensive tackles: 11 Peter Woods – junior (6'3, 315); 19 DeMonte Capehart – graduate student (6'5, 315); 42 Hevin Brown-Shuler – (redshirt) freshman (6'3, 315); 45 Vic Burley – (redshirt) sophomore (6'4, 320); 55 Makhi Williams-Lee – freshman (6'2, 270); 56 Champ Thompson – (redshirt) freshman (6'3, 290); 90 Stephiylan Green – (redshirt) sophomore (6'4, 290); 93 Caden Story – (redshirt) junior (6'3, 275); 95 Amare Adams – freshman (6'4, 285); 97 Patrick Swygert – (redshirt) sophomore (6'5, 270); Long snappers: 45 Philip Florenzo – graduate student (6'2, 240); 58 Holden Caspersen – graduate student (5'11, 215)	Linebackers: 0 Jamal Anderson – junior (6'2, 215); 9 Drew Woodaz – (redshirt) freshman (6'2, 215); 17 Wade Woodaz – senior (6'3, 235); 21 Kobe McCloud – (redshirt) junior (5'11, 225); 22 Dee Crayton – (redshirt) sophomore (6'2, 230); 26 C.J. Kubah-Taylor – (redshirt) freshman (6'3, 235); 33 Griffin Batt – (redshirt) junior (6'0, 225); 35 Jeremiah Alexander – (redshirt) junior (6'2, 250); 37 Logan Anderson – freshman (6'2, 225); 38 Dominic Staten – freshman (5'9, 230); 43 Billy Wilkes – (redshirt) freshman (6'1, 215); 47 Sammy Brown – sophomore (6'2, 235); 50 Fletcher Cothran – (redshirt) junior (6'3, 225); 52 William Bouton – (redshirt) freshman (6'0, 220); 53 Joseph Roberto II – (redshirt) freshman (6'2, 230); Cornerbacks: 1 Branden Strozier (redshirt) sophomore (6'1, 180); 2 Shelton Lewis – junior (5'11, 185); 8 Avieon Terrell – junior (5'11, 180); 10 Jeadyn Lukus – senior (6'2, 200); 12 Corian Gipson – (redshirt) freshman (6'1, 185); 16 Myles Oliver – (redshirt) junior (5'11, 180); 23 Ashton Hampton – sophomore (6'2, 200); 29 Michael Mankaka – (redshirt) junior (6'0, 190); Safeties: 7 Khalil Barnes – junior (6'0, 195); 14 Rob Billings – (redshirt) sophomore (6'2, 205); 18 Kylon Griffin – (redshirt) junior (5'11, 200); 20 Jakarrion Kenan – freshman (6'1, 175); 24 Tyler Venables – graduate student (5'11, 205); 25 Ricardo Jones – sophomore (6'2, 195); 27 Noah Dixon – (redshirt) freshman (6'1, 195); 30 Kylen Webb – (redshirt) sophomore (6'0, 200); 31 Joe Wilkinson – (redshirt) freshman (6'1, 190); Punters: 37 Will McCune – (redshirt) junior (6'1, 225); 40 Brodey Conn – P/S – (redshirt) sophomore (6'1, 205); 89 Jack Smith – (redshirt) junior (6'5, 245)

== Offseason ==
=== Recruiting ===
Clemson's 2025 class consisted of 15 signees. The class was ranked fourth in the ACC and twenty-sixth best overall by the 247Sports Composite.

College recruiting (2025)
Name	Hometown	School	Height	Weight	Commit date
Amare Adams; DT	Florence, South Carolina	South Florence	6 ft 4 in (1.93 m)	315 lb (143 kg)	Dec 3, 2023
Amare Adams; DT	Recruit ratings: Rivals: 247Sports: ESPN: (84)				
Logan Anderson; LB	Fyffe, Alabama	Fyffe	6 ft 2 in (1.88 m)	218 lb (99 kg)	Jul 26, 2024
Logan Anderson; LB	Recruit ratings: Rivals: 247Sports: ESPN: (79)				
Gavin Blanchard; IOL	Wesley Chapel, Florida	Wiregrass Ranch	6 ft 3 in (1.91 m)	290 lb (130 kg)	Nov 1, 2024
Gavin Blanchard; IOL	Recruit ratings: Rivals: 247Sports: ESPN: (80)				
Logan Brooking; TE	Savannah, Georgia	Savannah Christian Prep	6 ft 5 in (1.96 m)	220 lb (100 kg)	Nov 3, 2023
Logan Brooking; TE	Recruit ratings: Rivals: 247Sports: ESPN: (80)				
Rowan Byrne; OT	New Rochelle, New York	Iona Preparatory School	6 ft 6 in (1.98 m)	297 lb (135 kg)	Jun 6, 2024
Rowan Byrne; OT	Recruit ratings: Rivals: 247Sports: ESPN: (77)				
Gideon Davidson; RB	Lynchburg, Virginia	Liberty Christian Academy	6 ft 0 in (1.83 m)	193 lb (88 kg)	Jun 14, 2023
Gideon Davidson; RB	Recruit ratings: Rivals: 247Sports: ESPN: (84)				
Chris Denson; QB	Plant City, Florida	Plant City	6 ft 1.5 in (1.87 m)	175 lb (79 kg)	Nov 26, 2024
Chris Denson; QB	Recruit ratings: Rivals: 247Sports: ESPN: (77)				
Marquise Henderson; RB	Belton, South Carolina	Belton-Honea Path	5 ft 10 in (1.78 m)	170 lb (77 kg)	Dec 11, 2023
Marquise Henderson; RB	Recruit ratings: Rivals: 247Sports: ESPN: (82)				
Brayden Jacobs; OT	Alpharetta, Georgia	Milton	6 ft 7 in (2.01 m)	310 lb (140 kg)	Jan 28, 2024
Brayden Jacobs; OT	Recruit ratings: Rivals: 247Sports: ESPN: (80)				
Tucker Kattus; OT	Cincinnati, Ohio	St. Xavier	6 ft 5 in (1.96 m)	285 lb (129 kg)	Dec 1, 2024
Tucker Kattus; OT	Recruit ratings: Rivals: 247Sports: ESPN: (76)				
Jakarrion Kenan; S	Bennettsville, South Carolina	Marlboro County	6 ft 0.5 in (1.84 m)	177 lb (80 kg)	Dec 4, 2024
Jakarrion Kenan; S	Recruit ratings: Rivals: 247Sports: ESPN: (77)				
Carleton "Juju" Preston; WR	Woodbridge, Virginia	Freedom	5 ft 10 in (1.78 m)	150 lb (68 kg)	Dec 3, 2023
Carleton "Juju" Preston; WR	Recruit ratings: Rivals: 247Sports: ESPN: (77)				
Easton Ware; OT	Lynchburg, Virginia	Liberty Christian Academy	6 ft 5 in (1.96 m)	280 lb (130 kg)	Nov 1, 2023
Easton Ware; OT	Recruit ratings: Rivals: 247Sports: ESPN: (80)				
Ari Watford; EDGE	Norfolk, Virginia	Matthew Fontaine Maury	6 ft 5 in (1.96 m)	220 lb (100 kg)	Jan 24, 2024
Ari Watford; EDGE	Recruit ratings: Rivals: 247Sports: ESPN: (83)				
Makhi Williams-Lee; DL	Atlanta, Georgia	Lakeside	6 ft 2 in (1.88 m)	280 lb (130 kg)	Oct 2, 2024
Makhi Williams-Lee; DL	Recruit ratings: Rivals: 247Sports: ESPN: (80)				
Overall recruit ranking: Rivals: 32 247Sports: 29 ESPN: 37
Note: In many cases, Scout, Rivals, 247Sports, On3, and ESPN may conflict in their listings of height and weight.; In these cases, the average was taken. ESPN grades are on a 100-point scale.; Sources: "Rivals commits". Rivals.; "ESPN commits". ESPN.; "2025 Team Ranking". Rivals.com.; "247Sports commits". 247Sports.

=== Players leaving for NFL ===
==== NFL draftees ====
Round	Pick	Player	Position	NFL club
4	119	Barrett Carter	LB	Cincinnati Bengals
6	214	R. J. Mickens	S	Los Angeles Chargers
7	239	Phil Mafah	RB	Dallas Cowboys

==== Undrafted free agents ====
Player	Position	NFL club	Reference
Jake Briningstool	TE	Kansas City Chiefs	
Payton Page	DT	New York Jets	
Marcus Tate	OL	Philadelphia Eagles	

=== Transfers ===
==== Players leaving ====
Players leaving
Name	Number	Pos.	Height	Weight	Year	Hometown	College transferred to	Source(s)
Noble Johnson	3	WR	6'2"	210	(redshirt) Freshman	Rockwall, Texas	Arizona State	
Sherrod Covil Jr.	5	S	5'11"	200	Junior	Chesapeake, Virginia	Virginia Tech	
Tavoy Feagin	6	CB	6'0"	180	(redshirt) Freshman	Tampa, Florida	Ole Miss	
Tré Williams	8	DT	6'2"	315	(redshirt) Senior	Windsor, Connecticut	Michigan	
Troy Stellato	10	WR	6'1"	190	(redshirt) Junior	Fort Lauderdale, Florida	Kentucky	
Caleb Nix	41	S	6'0"	200	(redshirt) Sophomore	Phenix City, Alabama	Jacksonville State	
Jackson Crosby	82	WR	5'10"	190	(redshirt) Junior	Six Mile, South Carolina	East Tennessee State	
A.J. Hoffler	99	DE	6'4"	250	Sophomore	Stuart, Florida	Georgia Tech	

==== Incoming transfers ====
Incoming transfers
Name	Number	Pos.	Height	Weight	Year	Hometown	Previous school	Source(s)
Will Heldt	13	DE	6'6"	250	Junior	Carmel, IN	Purdue	
Ian Schieffelin	18	TE	6'8"	240	Graduate Student	Loganville, GA	Clemson basketball	
Jeremiah Alexander	35	LB	6'2"	232	(redshirt) Junior	Alabaster, AL	Alabama	
Charlie Reed	48	K/P	6'2"	205	(redshirt) Freshman	Austin, TX	Clemson soccer	
Tristan Smith	80	WR	6'5"	205	Senior	LaGrange, GA	Southeast Missouri State	

== Preseason award watchlists ==
Listed in the order that they were released

Award	Player	Position	Year
Lott Trophy	T. J. Parker	DE	JR
Lott Trophy	Peter Woods	DT	JR
Dodd Trophy	Dabo Swinney	HC	
Maxwell Award	Cade Klubnik	QB	SR
Maxwell Award	Antonio Williams	WR	(redshirt) JR
Bronko Nagurski Trophy	T. J. Parker	DE	JR
Bronko Nagurski Trophy	Avieon Terrell	CB	JR
Bronko Nagurski Trophy	Peter Woods	DT	JR
Outland Trophy	Blake Miller	OT	JR
Outland Trophy	Peter Woods	DT	JR
Butkus Award	Sammy Brown	LB	SO
Butkus Award	Wade Woodaz	LB	SR

Award	Player	Position	Year
Jim Thorpe Award	Avieon Terrell	CB	JR
Wuerffel Trophy	Adam Randall	RB	GS
Paul Hornung Award	Antonio Williams	WR	(redshirt) JR
Lou Groza Award	Nolan Hauser	K	SO
Walter Camp Award	Cade Klubnik	QB	SR
Walter Camp Award	Peter Woods	DT	JR
Biletnikoff Award	Bryant Wesco	WR	SO
Biletnikoff Award	Antonio Williams	WR	(redshirt) JR
Davey O'Brien Award	Cade Klubnik	QB	SR
Rimington Trophy	Ryan Linthicum	C	GS

Award	Player	Position	Year
Bednarik Award	T.J. Parker	DE	JR
Bednarik Award	Aveion Terrell	CB	JR
Bednarik Award	Peter Woods	DT	JR
Rotary Lombardi Award	Sammy Brown	LB	SO
Rotary Lombardi Award	Blake Miller	OT	SR
Rotary Lombardi Award	T.J. Parker	DE	JR
Rotary Lombardi Award	Peter Woods	DT	JR
Manning Award	Cade Klubnik	QB	SR
Johnny Unitas Golden Arm Award	Cade Klubnik	QB	SR
Earl Campbell Tyler Rose Award	Cade Klubnik	QB	SR
