= Kyle Richardson =

Kyle Richardson may refer to:

- Kyle Richardson (punter)
- Kyle Richardson (American football coach)
- Kyle Richardson (basketball)
- Kyle Richardson (swimmer)
