= Laurens District 55 High School =

Location
- 5058 Highway 76 West Laurens; Laurens, South Carolina 29360; United States; 34.502596°N 82.067853°W

Information
- Type: Public high school
- Established: 1972 (54 years ago)
- School district: Laurens School District 55
- Superintendent: Rhett Harris (interim)
- Principal: Lewis Compton
- Teaching staff: 123.00 (FTE)
- Enrollment: 1,434 (2024–2025)
- Student to teacher ratio: 11.66
- Colors: Green and gold
- Mascot: Raiders
- Rival: Clinton High School Greenwood High School Hillcrest High School
- Communities served: Laurens, Gray Court, Waterloo, Princeton, and Watts Mills
- Website: www.ldhsraiders.org/o/ldhs

Laurens District 55 High School, also referred to as LDHS or simply Laurens High School, is a four-year public high school in Laurens, South Carolina. It is the only high school in Laurens School District 55 and one of two in Laurens County, South Carolina. The feeder schools include Laurens Middle School, Sanders Middle School, Gray Court Owings, and Hickory Tavern Middle School.

The district (and therefore, the high school's attendance boundary) includes Laurens, Gray Court, Waterloo, Princeton, and Watts Mills.

== History ==
The school was opened in 1972 when Hickory Tavern, Sanders, Gray Court-Owings School, Ford and Laurens High schools were consolidated into one high school. "District 55" was added to the end of the name to differentiate between the pre-existing Laurens High School, and to appease the communities represented by the three other high schools.

== Athletics ==
 Laurens High School has a variety of ninth-grade, junior varsity, and varsity sports. The football team plays its home games at K.C. Hanna Stadium, located on the school grounds. The baseball team plays its games at Historic Ed Prescott Field. Each game can be heard on radio through 860AM and 104.1 FM WLBG.

=== Football ===
 The Raider football team has 3 AAAA State Championships in its history: 1983, 1984, and 1991 along with over 21 region championships most recently in 2016, 2019, and 2022. 

==== Basketball ====
 LDHS has basketball teams for both sexes. With The Lady Raiders basketball team won AAAA State Championships in 1998, 1999 and 2001.[3][4][5]

===== Track =====
  The Laurens Raider track team won the AAAA track State Championship in 1992. Josue’ Garcia-Rivas, a member of the track team, is the high school national record holder for the 1600 meter run.[6]

====== Wrestling ======
The Laurens Raider wrestling team has won a Region 1AAAAA title in 2011, 2019. The Lady 

====== Softball ======
 Raider softball team has won Region Championships in 2010, 2014, 2015 and 2016. 

====== Baseball ======
 The Raider baseball team has won three state Championships and  a combined total of 20 region championships with the last one coming in 2023

== Controversies ==
=== Prayer controversy ===
The school traditionally allowed the student body to vote on whether an invocation would be held at graduation each year. However, in May 2011, a student brought the issue to the attention of the Freedom from Religion Foundation. As a result, former school superintendent Billy Strickland announced that the prayer would no longer be permitted. In a public statement, Strickland remarked, "Our legal counsel has advised us that we should discontinue the practice of voting on whether to have an invocation delivered at the graduation ceremony so we do not create a basis for a legal challenge." Strickland did go on to say that students who speak during the ceremony might still pray because the school does not approve or disapprove what they say.

== Notable alumni ==
- Anna Hall, professional volleyball player
- Norris Brown, former NFL tight end
- Jayden McGowan, college football wide receiver for the Vanderbilt Commodores and the Boston College Eagles
