= Turbo Richard =

American college football player (born 2006)

No. 1 – Indiana Hoosiers
- Position: Running back
- Class: Junior

Personal information
- Born: January 26, 2006 (age 20)
- Listed height: 5 ft 9 in (1.75 m)
- Listed weight: 204 lb (93 kg)

Career information
- High school: Northwestern (Rock Hill, South Carolina)
- College: Boston College (2024–2025); Indiana (2026–present)
- Stats at ESPN

Hanovii "Turbo" Richard (born January 26, 2006) is an American college football running back for the Indiana Hoosiers. He previously played for the Boston College Eagles.

== Early life ==
Richard attended Northwestern High School in Rock Hill, South Carolina. While at Northwestern, he set the single-season and career rushing school record, achieving over 5,000 career rushing yards and over 50 career touchdowns. Richard was a 3-star recruit and the 113th ranked running back in the class of 2024. In track and field, Richard was the Upper State Champion in the boys 100m.

== College career ==
=== Boston College ===
==== 2024 season ====
Richard scored his first touchdown with the Eagles on September 21, 2024, in a win against Michigan State. As a true freshman, he appeared in eight games while rushing for 278 yards and two touchdowns.

==== 2025 season ====
As a sophomore, Richard rushed for 749 yards and nine rushing touchdowns in 11 games played. He finished 5th in the ACC in total touchdowns with 11, only behind Haynes King, J'Mari Taylor, Kendrick Raphael, and Adam Randall. Richard's career long rushing touchdown came in a 24–28 loss against the Cal Golden Bears when Richard scored a 71-yard rushing touchdown in the fourth quarter. He also caught for 249 yards and two touchdowns.

On December 29, 2025, Richard entered the transfer portal. In his career at Boston College, he totaled 19 games, 1027 rushing yards, and 11 rushing touchdowns.

=== Indiana ===
==== 2026 season ====
On January 4, 2026, Richard transferred to play for the Indiana Hoosiers with two years of eligibility remaining. On September 5, 2026, He scored his first rushing touchdown against North Texas. In week 5 against the Rutgers Scarlet Knights, Richard rushed for 204 yards on 13 carries and a touchdown, being his single-game high and being the most rushing yards in a game for the Hoosiers since Stevie Scott ran for 204 in a game against Virginia in 2018.

== Personal life ==
He was given the nickname "Turbo" at age 9, due to his speed and explosiveness in both track and football.

== Career statistics ==
| Year | Team | GP | Rushing | | | | Receiving | | | |
| Year | Team | GP | Att | Yds | Avg | TD | Rec | Yds | Avg | TD |
|---|---|---|---|---|---|---|---|---|---|---|
| 2024 | Boston College | 8 | 55 | 278 | 5.1 | 2 | 2 | 62 | 31 | 0 |
| 2025 | Boston College | 11 | 145 | 749 | 5.2 | 9 | 30 | 213 | 7.1 | 2 |
| 2026 | Indiana | 5 | 63 | 587 | 9.3 | 5 | 3 | 47 | 15.7 | 0 |
| Career | | 24 | 263 | 1614 | 6.1 | 16 | 35 | 322 | 9.2 | 2 |
