= Princeton, South Carolina =

- Census-designated place
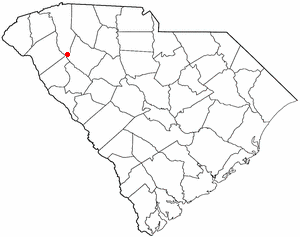
- Location of Princeton, South Carolina
- Coordinates: 34°29′47″N 82°17′32″W
- Country: United States
- State: South Carolina
- County: Laurens

Area
  - Total: 0.78 sq mi (2.02 km^{2})
  - Land: 0.78 sq mi (2.02 km^{2})
  - Water: 0 sq mi (0.00 km^{2})
- Elevation: 738 ft (225 m)

Population (2020)
  - Total: 49
  - Density: 62.9/sq mi (24.27/km^{2})
- Time zone: UTC-5 (Eastern (EST))
  - Summer (DST): UTC-4 (EDT)
- ZIP code: 29654
- Area codes: 864, 821
- FIPS code: 45-58435
- GNIS feature ID: 2403448

Princeton is an unincorporated community and census-designated place (CDP) in Laurens County, South Carolina, United States of America. The population was 62 at the 2010 census. It is part of the Greenville–Mauldin–Easley Metropolitan Statistical Area.

== Geography ==
Princeton is located in western Laurens County along the border with Greenville County. U.S. Routes 25 and 76 join 300 feet (90 m) west of the CDP, with US 25 leading south 23 miles (37 km) to Greenwood and US 76 leading east 17 miles (27 km) to Laurens. The two highways run northwest together for one mile, with US 25 continuing north 28 miles (45 km) to Greenville and US 76 leading west 28 miles to Anderson.

According to the United States Census Bureau, the Princeton CDP has a total area of 0.73 square miles (1.9 km^{2}), all land.

== Demographics ==
Historical population
Census	Pop.	Note	%±
2020	49		—
U.S. Decennial Census

As of the census of 2000, there were 65 people, 30 households, and 18 families residing in the CDP. The population density was 87.1 inhabitants per square mile (33.6/km^{2}). There were 36 housing units at an average density of 48.2 per square mile (18.6/km^{2}). The racial makeup of the CDP was 80.00% White, 16.92% African American, and 3.08% from two or more races.

There were 30 households, out of which 20.0% had children under the age of 18 living with them, 56.7% were married couples living together, and 36.7% were non-families. 30.0% of all households were made up of individuals, and 16.7% had someone living alone who was 65 years of age or older. The average household size was 2.17 and the average family size was 2.63.

In the CDP, the population was spread out, with 10.8% under the age of 18, 3.1% from 18 to 24, 32.3% from 25 to 44, 29.2% from 45 to 64, and 24.6% who were 65 years of age or older. The median age was 49 years. For every 100 females, there were 132.1 males. For every 100 females age 18 and over, there were 132.0 males.

The median income for a household in the CDP was $53,750, and the median income for a family was $53,750. Males had a median income of $43,750 versus $31,250 for females. The per capita income for the CDP was $25,769. None of the population and none of the families were below the poverty line.

== Education ==
It is in the Laurens School District 55. The comprehensive high school is Laurens District 55 High School.
