= Gray Court, South Carolina =

- Town
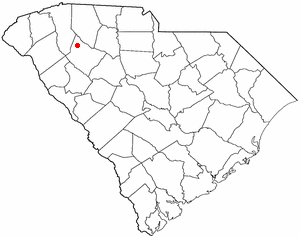
- Location of Gray Court, South Carolina
- Coordinates: 34°36′31″N 82°07′18″W
- Country: United States
- State: South Carolina
- County: Laurens

Area
  - Total: 1.84 sq mi (4.76 km^{2})
  - Land: 1.84 sq mi (4.76 km^{2})
  - Water: 0 sq mi (0.00 km^{2})
- Elevation: 794 ft (242 m)

Population (2020)
  - Total: 763
  - Density: 415.1/sq mi (160.29/km^{2})
- Time zone: UTC-5 (Eastern (EST))
  - Summer (DST): UTC-4 (EDT)
- ZIP code: 29645
- Area codes: 864, 821
- FIPS code: 45-30355
- GNIS feature ID: 2406606
- Website: townofgraycourtsc.org

Gray Court is a town in Laurens County, South Carolina, United States. As of the 2020 census, Gray Court had a population of 763. It is part of the Greenville–Mauldin–Easley Metropolitan Statistical Area.

== History ==
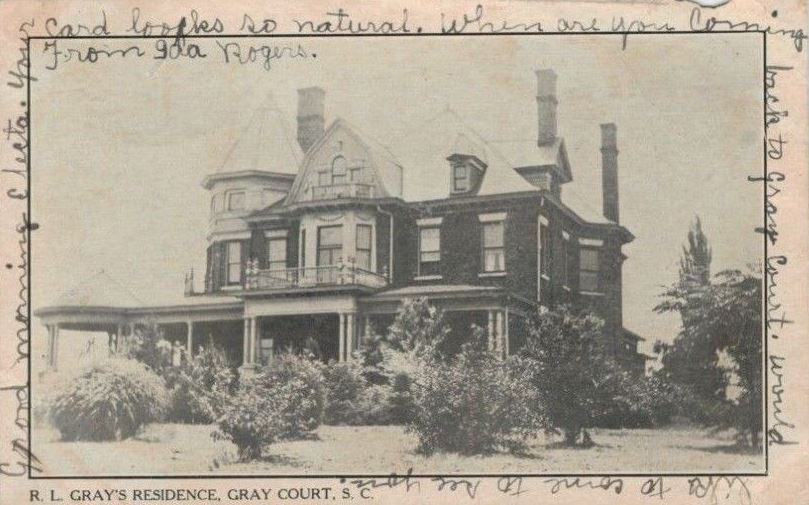
The residence of R.L. Gray, for whom the town is named, was shown on a postcard mailed in 1907.

Gray Court was incorporated as a town in 1899.

The Gray Court-Owings School was listed on the National Register of Historic Places in 2004.

== Geography ==
Gray Court is located between the cities of Fountain Inn and Laurens, South Carolina along highway 14 and 385. Its closest neighbor is the village of Owings, which lies about one mile to the north.

According to the United States Census Bureau, the town has a total area of 1.9 square miles (4.9 km^{2}), all land.

== Demographics ==
Historical population
Census	Pop.	Note	%±
1900	181		—
1910	284		56.9%
1920	318		12.0%
1930	360		13.2%
1940	401		11.4%
1950	479		19.5%
1960	473		−1.3%
1970	859		81.6%
1980	988		15.0%
1990	914		−7.5%
2000	1,021		11.7%
2010	795		−22.1%
2020	763		−4.0%
U.S. Decennial Census

=== 2020 census ===
Gray Court town, South Carolina – Racial and ethnic composition Note: the US Census treats Hispanic/Latino as an ethnic category. This table excludes Latinos from the racial categories and assigns them to a separate category. Hispanics/Latinos may be of any race.
Race / Ethnicity (NH = Non-Hispanic)	Pop 2000	Pop 2010	Pop 2020	% 2000	% 2010	% 2020
White alone (NH)	364	328	284	35.65%	41.26%	37.22%
Black or African American alone (NH)	551	332	309	53.97%	41.76%	40.50%
Native American or Alaska Native alone (NH)	2	2	4	0.20%	0.25%	0.52%
Asian alone (NH)	1	0	0	0.10%	0.00%	0.00%
Pacific Islander alone (NH)	0	1	0	0.00%	0.13%	0.00%
Other Race alone (NH)	0	0	7	0.00%	0.00%	0.92%
Mixed race or Multiracial (NH)	6	10	30	0.59%	1.26%	3.93%
Hispanic or Latino (any race)	97	122	129	9.50%	15.35%	16.91%
Total	1,021	795	763	100.00%	100.00%	100.00%

As of the 2020 United States census, there were 763 people, 322 households, and 185 families residing in the town.

=== 2000 census ===
As of the census of 2000, there were 1,021 people, 371 households, and 270 families residing in the town. The population density was 551.0 inhabitants per square mile (212.7/km^{2}). There were 398 housing units at an average density of 214.8 per square mile (82.9/km^{2}). The racial makeup of the town was 37.81% White, 54.65% African American, 0.20% Native American, 0.10% Asian, 6.66% from other races, and 0.59% from two or more races. Hispanic or Latino of any race were 9.50% of the population.

There were 371 households, out of which 31.8% had children under the age of 18 living with them, 41.8% were married couples living together, 21.6% had a female householder with no husband present, and 27.2% were non-families. 24.3% of all households were made up of individuals, and 11.1% had someone living alone who was 65 years of age or older. The average household size was 2.75 and the average family size was 3.15.

In the town, the population was spread out, with 26.9% under the age of 18, 10.3% from 18 to 24, 28.4% from 25 to 44, 22.2% from 45 to 64, and 12.1% who were 65 years of age or older. The median age was 34 years. For every 100 females, there were 98.6 males. For every 100 females age 18 and over, there were 93.3 males.

The median income for a household in the town was $31,146, and the median income for a family was $34,545. Males had a median income of $22,639 versus $19,648 for females. The per capita income for the town was $13,066. About 16.4% of families and 20.5% of the population were below the poverty line, including 29.8% of those under age 18 and 16.3% of those age 65 or over.

== Government ==
=== 2019 mayoral election ===
Mayor
Candidate	Votes
Scott Cook	67
Stellartean Jones	57
John Carter (inc.)	54

Mayor, run–off
Candidate	Votes
Stellartean Jones	126
Scott Cook	85

== Education ==
It is in the Laurens School District 55. The comprehensive high school is Laurens District 55 High School.
