= Norris Brown (American football) =

American football player (1961–2026)

No. 86, 87, 81
- Position: Tight end

Personal information
- Born: July 10, 1961; Laurens, South Carolina, U.S.
- Died: July 31, 2026 (aged 65)
- Listed height: 6 ft 3 in (1.91 m)
- Listed weight: 220 lb (100 kg)

Career information
- High school: Laurens District 55
- College: Georgia
- NFL draft: 1983: 8th round, 213th overall pick

Career history
- Minnesota Vikings (1983); New Jersey Generals (1984); Jacksonville Bulls (1985)

Career NFL statistics
- Games played: 2
- Games started: 0
- Stats at Pro Football Reference

Willie Norris Brown (July 10, 1961 – July 31, 2026) was an American professional football player who was a tight end in the National Football League (NFL) and United States Football League (USFL). Born in Laurens, South Carolina, he attended Laurens District 55 High School. After playing college football for the Georgia Bulldogs, he was selected by the Minnesota Vikings in the eighth round of the 1983 NFL draft. He played in the first two games of the 1983 season, but did not play again after that.

Brown died on July 31, 2026, at the age of 65.
