= Gideon Davidson =

American football player (born 2006)

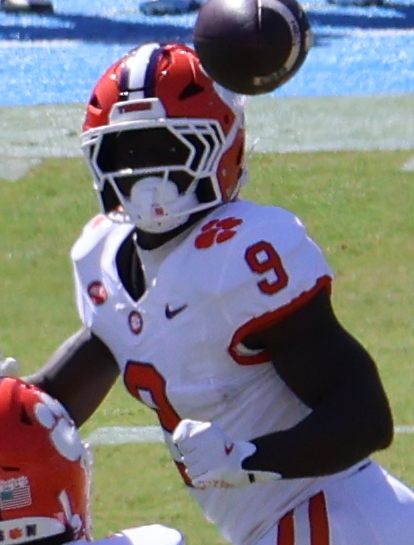
- Davidson with the Clemson Tigers in 2025

No. 9 – Clemson Tigers
- Position: Running back
- Class: Freshman

Personal information
- Born: May 16, 2006 (age 20); Ghana
- Listed height: 6 ft 0 in (1.83 m)
- Listed weight: 200 lb (91 kg)

Career information
- High school: Liberty Christian Academy (Lynchburg, Virginia, U.S.)
- College: Clemson (2025–present)

Gideon Davidson (born May 16, 2006) is an American college football running back for the Clemson Tigers.

== Early life ==
Davidson was born in Ghana. His father died while his mother was pregnant and when he was 18 months his mother sent him to an orphanage in Accra, where he was adopted by a family in the United States. Davidson attended Liberty Christian Academy in Lynchburg, Virginia. He rushed for 1,197 yards with 18 touchdowns as a freshman and 1,392 yards and 23 touchdowns as a sophomore. As a junior in 2023, Davidson was the MaxPreps’ 2023 National Junior of the Year after rushing for 2,752 yards on 217 carries with 45 total touchdowns. As a senior in 2024, he was the Gatorade Football Player of the Year for Virginia after rushing for 2,054 yards and 34 touchdowns.

Davidson was a four-star recruit and was ranked among the best running backs in his class. He played in the 2025 Navy All-American Bowl. He committed to Clemson University to play college football.

== College career ==
Davidson competed for playing time his true freshman year in 2025.

=== College statistics ===
Year	Team	GP	Receiving				Rushing			
Year	Team	GP	Rec	Yds	Avg	TD	Att	Yds	Avg	TD
2025	Clemson	13	11	93	8.5	0	60	260	4.3	0
Career		13	11	93	8.5	0	60	260	4.3	0
