= Bryant Wesco =

American football player (born 2005)

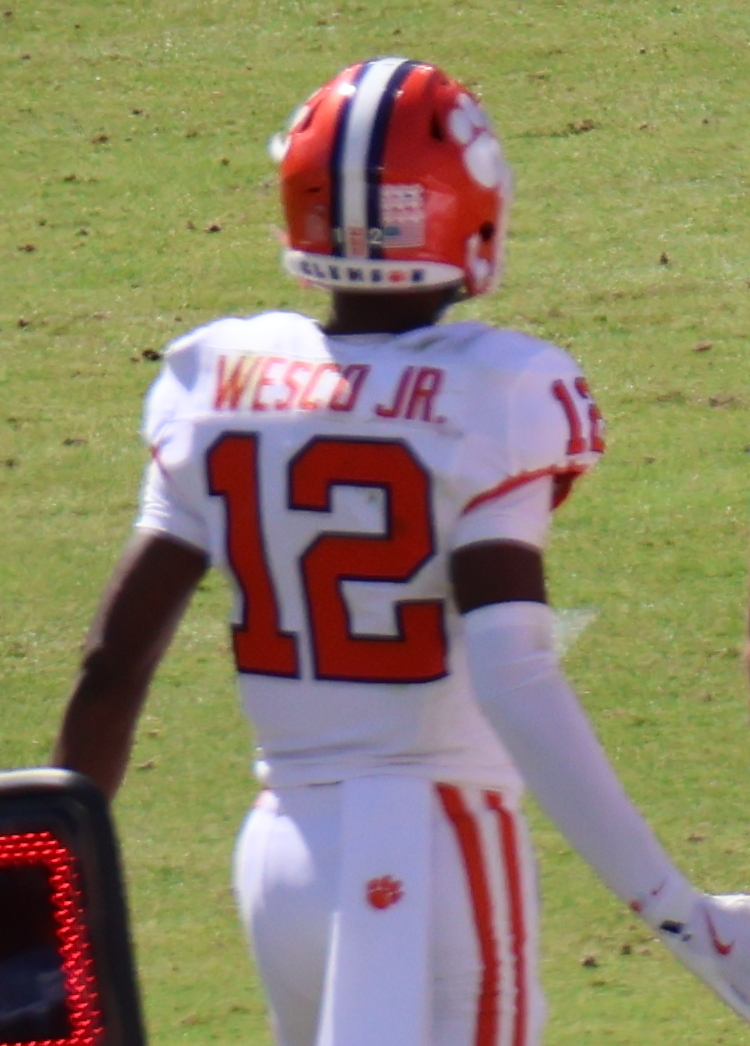

No. 12 – Clemson Tigers
- Position: Wide receiver
- Class: Junior

Personal information
- Born: September 22, 2005 (age 21)
- Listed height: 6 ft 2 in (1.88 m)
- Listed weight: 190 lb (86 kg)

Career information
- High school: Midlothian (Midlothian, Texas)
- College: Clemson (2024–present)

Awards and highlights
- Freshman All-American (2024)
- Stats at ESPN

Bryant Wesco Jr. (born September 22, 2005) is an American college football wide receiver for the Clemson Tigers.

== Early life ==
Wesco was born on September 22, 2005, and grew up in Midlothian, Texas. He attended Midlothian High School, where he competed in football and track. After playing on the freshman football team in 2020, he made the varsity as a sophomore in 2021 and made 17 receptions for 212 yards and four touchdowns. As a junior in 2022, he recorded 56 receptions for 1,072 yards and 12 touchdowns, despite Midlothian using a run-heavy playbook. In his senior year, Wesco caught 36 passes for 619 yards and 13 touchdowns, despite appearing in just seven games. He concluded his high school career having totaled 109 catches for 1,903 yards and 29 touchdowns, averaging 17.5 yards-per-reception.

Wesco was invited to the Under Armour All-America Game and to the Polynesian Bowl. A five-star prospect, he was a consensus top 35 recruit in the nation and was ranked in the top 25 by PrepStar (15), 247Sports (22) and ESPN (25). He committed to play college football for the Clemson Tigers.

== College career ==
Wesco entered Clemson as an early enrollee in January 2024. He received his first start in the second game of the season and caught a 76-yard touchdown pass against Appalachian State.

=== College statistics ===
Year	Team	GP	Receiving			
Year	Team	GP	Rec	Yds	Avg	TD
2024	Clemson	12	41	708	17.3	5
2025	Clemson	7	31	537	17.3	6
Career		19	72	1,245	17.3	11
