= Jayden McGowan =

American football player

No. 15 – Baylor Bears
- Position: Wide receiver
- Class: Senior

Personal information
- Listed height: 5 ft 7 in (1.70 m)
- Listed weight: 187 lb (85 kg)

Career information
- High school: Laurens District 55 (Laurens, South Carolina)
- College: Vanderbilt (2022–2023); Boston College (2024); Charlotte (2025); Baylor (2026–present)
- Stats at ESPN

Jayden McGowan is an American college football wide receiver for the Baylor Bears. He previously played for the Vanderbilt Commodores, the Boston College Eagles and the Charlotte 49ers.

== Early life ==
McGowan attended Laurens District 55 High School. He was rated as a three-star recruit and committed to play college football for the Vanderbilt Commodores overs offers such as Army, Navy, Liberty, Middle Tennessee State, and Harvard.

== College career ==
=== Vanderbilt ===
In week 2 of the 2022 season, McGowan tallied four receptions for 118 yards and a touchdown in a 42-31 win over Elon, earning SEC freshman of the week honors. He finished his freshman season in 2022 with 44 receptions for 453 yards and three touchdowns, while also adding 51 yards on the ground. In the 2023 season opener, McGowan hauled in six passes for 72 yards, added 11 yards on the ground, and returned a kickoff 97 yards for a touchdown, as he helped the Commodores beat Hawaii 35-28. During the 2023 season, he hauled in 36 receptions for 383 yards, while also rushing for 109 yards. After the conclusion of the 2023 season, McGowan entered his name into the NCAA transfer portal.

=== Boston College ===
McGowan initially decided to transfer to play for the South Carolina Gamecocks. However, he later flipped his commitment to play for the Boston College Eagles.

On December 3, 2024, McGowan announced that he would enter the transfer portal for the second time.

=== Charlotte ===
On January 10, 2025, McGowan announced that he would transfer to University of North Carolina Charlotte 49ers.

On January 12, 2026, McGowan announced that he would enter the transfer portal for the third time.

=== Baylor ===
On April 25, 2026, McGowan announced that he would transfer to Baylor University.
