= Gray Court-Owings School =

- U.S. National Register of Historic Places
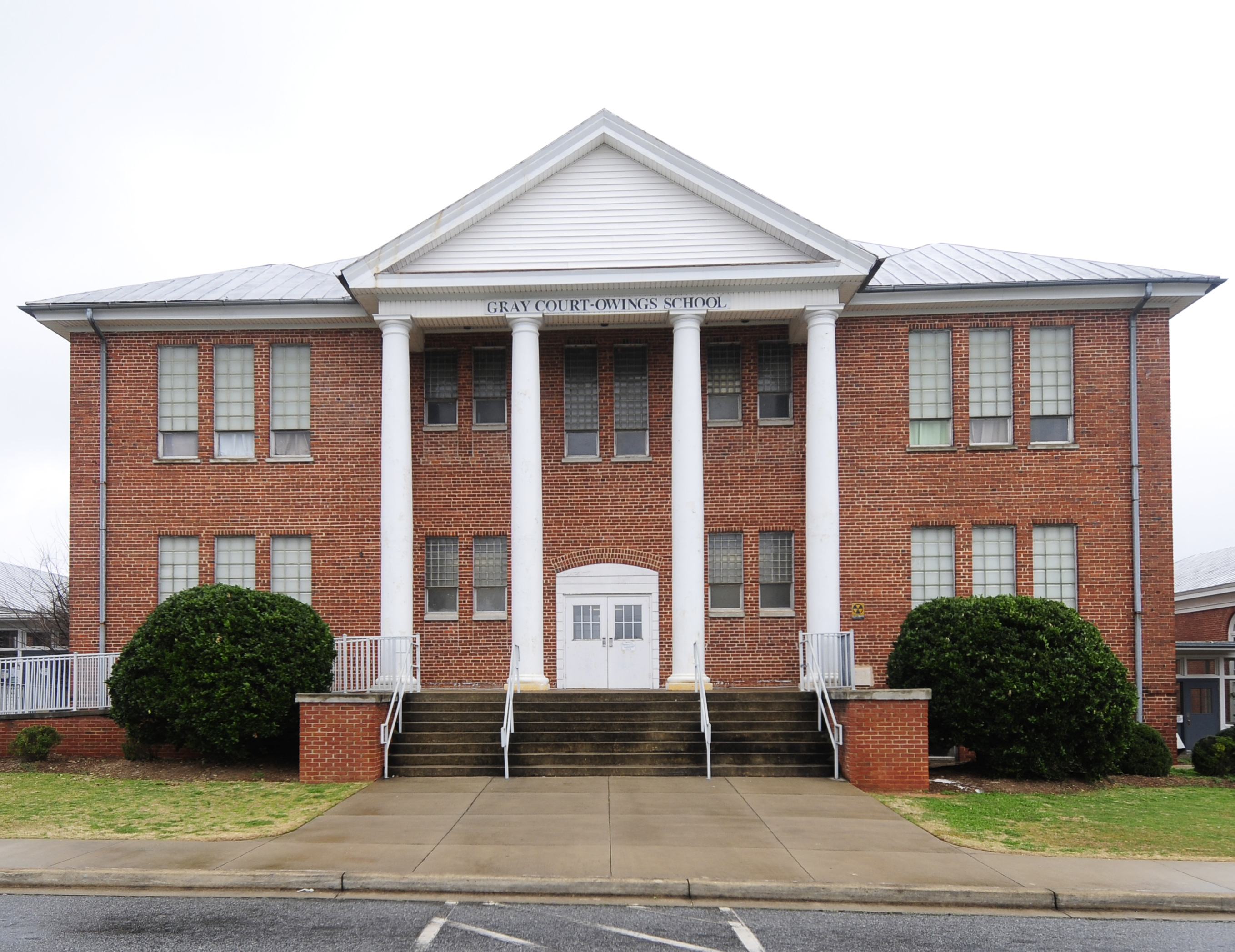
- Gray Court-Owings School, February 2012

- Location within South Carolina Location within the United States
- Location: 9210 SC 14, Gray Court, South Carolina
- Coordinates: 34°37′11″N 82°07′22″W
- Area: 7.2 acres (2.9 ha)
- Built: 1914, 1928
- Architectural style: Colonial Revival
- NRHP reference No.: 04000354
- Added to NRHP: April 21, 2004

Gray Court-Owings School is a historic school building located at Gray Court, Laurens County, South Carolina. The building consists of a two-story central brick building constructed in 1914, with a flanking one-story brick-veneered high school building and a one-story brick-veneered auditorium, both built in 1928. The flanking buildings are designed in the Colonial Revival style with Tuscan order porticos. A two-story Tuscan order portico was added to the entrance of the 1914 building in 1928. A contributing one-story frame potato house was built in the 1930s to help local farmers preserve their crops.

It was added to the National Register of Historic Places in 2004.

Gray Court-Owings is the home of the Tigers who participate in both junior high (7th and 8th grade) football and basketball in the Laurens District 55 school district.
