= Adam Randall (American football) =

American football player (born 2004)

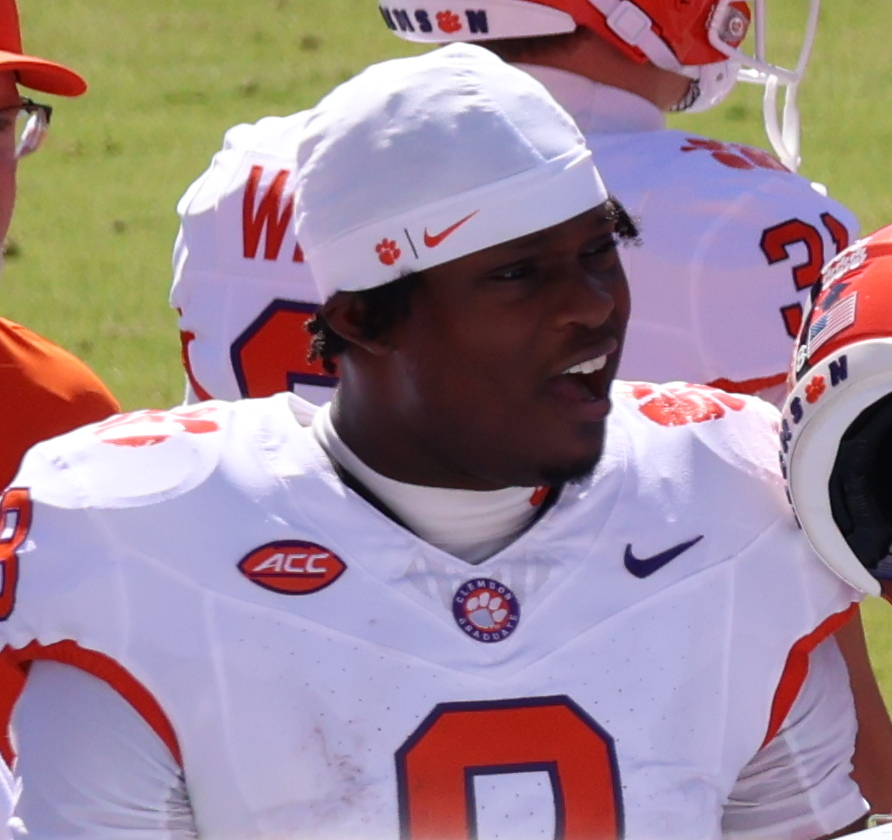
- Randall with the Clemson Tigers in 2025

No. 23 – Baltimore Ravens
- Position: Running back
- Roster status: Active

Personal information
- Born: July 14, 2004 (age 22)
- Listed height: 6 ft 3 in (1.91 m)
- Listed weight: 240 lb (109 kg)

Career information
- High school: Myrtle Beach (Myrtle Beach, South Carolina)
- College: Clemson (2022–2025)
- NFL draft: 2026: 5th round, 174th overall pick

Career history
- Baltimore Ravens (2026–present)
- Stats at Pro Football Reference

Adam Randall (born July 14, 2004) is an American professional football running back for the Baltimore Ravens of the National Football League (NFL). He played college football for the Clemson Tigers and was selected by the Ravens in the fifth round of the 2026 NFL draft.

== Early life ==
Randall grew up in Little River, South Carolina, a small town in North Myrtle Beach, South Carolina. Randall comes from an athletic family, his father Jerome was a standout basketball player at South Carolina State and his brother Austin currently plays cornerback for Clemson after a stint at Coastal Carolina. His father serves as the Chief Investigator of the Horry County Public Defender's office and operates a non profit, while his mother Wanda is a guidance counselor. Randall began playing football at the age of 7, where he took snaps for multiple youth teams in the Myrtle Beach area, being was coached mostly by his father. He attended Myrtle Beach High School where he played football and ran track. As a senior Randall was a finalist for the Mr. Football South Carolina Award and was selected to play in the Under Armour All-American Game. A four star prospect, he committed to play college football at Clemson University, whose football camps he had attended while growing up.

== College career ==
Randall early enrolled at Clemson in 2022 and received praise for his performance in spring practice before suffering an ACL tear. He recovered quickly and made his collegiate debut in Week 3 against Louisiana Tech. Randall made his first start in the 2022 Orange Bowl, where he caught three passes for 44 yards. During the 2024 ACC championship, during which he switched positions to running back, he returned a kickoff 41 yards to set up a game winning Clemson field goal. In the offseason, it was announced that Randall would make the permanent switch to the backfield.

=== College statistics ===
Year	Team	GP	Receiving				Rushing			
Year	Team	GP	Rec	Yds	Avg	TD	Att	Yds	Avg	TD
2022	Clemson	12	10	128	12.8	0	0	0	0.0	0
2023	Clemson	13	22	250	11.4	0	0	0	0.0	0
2024	Clemson	12	16	115	9.7	2	4	44	11.0	0
2025	Clemson	13	36	254	7.1	3	168	814	4.8	10
Career		50	84	787	15.7	5	172	858	5.0	10

== Professional career ==
Pre-draft measurables
Height	Weight	Arm length	Hand span	Wingspan	40-yard dash	10-yard split	20-yard split	20-yard shuttle	Vertical jump	Broad jump	Bench press
6 ft 3 3/8 in (1.91 m)	232 lb (105 kg)	32 3/8 in (0.82 m)	9 3/4 in (0.25 m)	6 ft 7 3/4 in (2.03 m)	4.50 s	1.60 s	2.64 s	4.31 s	37.0 in (0.94 m)	10 ft 4 in (3.15 m)	26 reps
All values from NFL Combine/Pro Day

Randall was drafted by the Baltimore Ravens with the 174th pick in the fifth round of the 2026 NFL draft. Following the draft, reports came out that Steve Bisciotti, the owner of the Ravens, made the pick himself. General Manager Eric DeCosta confirmed this, and clarified that this was the first instance where Bisciotti made the draft pick for Baltimore.

On August 30, 2026, Randall was placed on injured reserve. On November 18, 2026, Randall was activated from the injured reserve.
