= Kyle Richardson (American football coach) =

American football coach (born 1978)

Current position
- Title: Co-offensive coordinator & tight ends coach
- Team: Clemson
- Conference: ACC

Biographical details
- Born: April 22, 1978 (age 48)
- Education: Appalachian State University; California University; Clemson University

Coaching career (HC unless noted)
- 2000: Avery County HS (NC) (WR)
- 2001–2002: Lee County HS (NC) (WR)
- 2003-2004: North Gwinnett HS (GA) (WR)
- 2005-2006: Southeastern Louisiana (WR)
- 2007–2010: Northwestern HS (SC) (OC)
- 2011–2015: Northwestern HS (SC)
- 2016–2022: Clemson (Senior OA)
- 2022–present: Clemson (CO-OC/TE)

Administrative career (AD unless noted)
- 2020–2021: Clemson (Director of Player Development)

Head coaching record
- Overall: 58–13 (high school)

Accomplishments and honors

Championships
- 3 SC High School Football State Championships (2010, 2013, 2015); 2 National Championships (2016, 2018)

Awards
- Inducted into the York County Sports Hall of Fame in 2019 and the Belmont Sports Hall of Fame in 2024.

Kyle Richardson (born April 22, 1978) is an American football coach who is currently the co-offensive coordinator and tight ends coach at Clemson University. He previously served as the head coach at Northwestern High School in Rock Hill, South Carolina, from 2011 to 2015.

In 2016, Richardson joined Clemson University as a senior offensive assistant and served in that role until 2020. That year, he was promoted to director of player development, a position previously held by Brad Scott, who left to join his son, Jeff Scott, at the University of South Florida. On December 10, 2021, Richardson was officially named Clemson's passing game coordinator and tight ends coach.

Some of the prominent players Richardson has helped develop include Jared Cook, Cordarrelle Patterson, Justin Worley, Mason Rudolph, Davis Allen and Jake Briningstool.

== Early life and education ==
Richardson attended South Point High School in Belmont, North Carolina, and earned his undergraduate degree from Appalachian State University in 2001 and has two master's degrees, including a master's from California University and Clemson University.

== Coaching career ==
=== Early coaching career ===
Richardson started his coaching career at Avery County High School in Newland, North Carolina, while a student at Appalachian State University. From Avery County he went to Lee County High School in Sanford, North Carolina. After two years at Lee County, Richardson accepted a position at North Gwinnett High School in Suwanee, Georgia, where he coached future NFL tight end Jared Cook. In 2005 Richardson accepted the wide receiver position at Southeastern Louisiana University an NCAA Division 1-AA university in the Southland Conference.

=== Northwestern High School ===
In 2007, Richardson was hired as the offensive coordinator at Northwestern High School in Rock Hill, South Carolina, under SC Hall of Fame head coach Jimmy Wallace.

In 2011, Richardson was named the head coach at Northwestern High School. During his tenure as head coach, Richardson led the Trojans to a 58–13 record, including 4 region championships, 3 state championship game appearances and 2 state championships in 2013 and 2015. In Richardson's 9 years at Northwestern, he was a part of 8 region championships, 6 state championship game appearances, 3 state championship titles, and 2 undefeated seasons. On March 18, 2016, Richardson announced his resignation.

=== Clemson ===
In 2016, Richardson joined Clemson University as a senior offensive assistant.

On December 10, 2021, Richardson was promoted to passing game coordinator and tight ends coach, replacing Brandon Streeter and Tony Elliott, respectively.

== Personal ==
=== Personal ===
Richardson's parents both grew up in the Clemson area, both graduated from Seneca High School right outside of Clemson. Richardson is married to Amanda Gray Richardson, who is a senior associate athletic director at Clemson. Richardson has two daughters Lexi Grace, Presley Ann and one son Cooper. Richardson and family have a nonprofit foundation called WIN TODAY! Richardson Family Foundation that helps kids from low-income families participate in extracurricular activities.
