= Jeremiah Hasley =

American football player

No. 85 – Duke Blue Devils
- Position: Tight end
- Class: Redshirt Senior

Personal information
- Listed height: 6 ft 3 in (1.91 m)
- Listed weight: 250 lb (113 kg)

Career information
- High school: Pine-Richland (Gibsonia, Pennsylvania)
- College: Duke (2022–present)
- Stats at ESPN

Jeremiah Hasley is an American college football tight end for the Duke Blue Devils.

== Early life ==
Hasley attended Pine-Richland High School in Gibsonia, Pennsylvania, where he was a three-year letterman in football. He was a two-way player, variously lining up at wide receiver, tight end, and linebacker. As a junior, Hasley helped Pine-Richland win the Pennsylvania Interscholastic Athletic Association Class 5A state title. He was a two-time first-team All-Northeast Conference honoree at linebacker and was named to the 2021 Pittsburgh Post-Gazette Fabulous 22 all-star team.

Hasley was rated as a consensus three-star recruit. He received his first NCAA Division I offer from UPenn in December 2020. Hasley went on to receive offers from schools such as Kent State, Army, Navy, and Air Force. In June 2021, he visited Duke University with his parents and received an offer while there, his first from a Power Five school. A few days later, Hasley verbally committed to playing college football for the Duke Blue Devils. He was recruited by Duke as a linebacker.

== College career ==
As a freshman in 2022, Hasley appeared in four games and was redshirted. He was also presented the team's Sonny Falcone Iron Duke Award, given to the developmental player who enjoyed the best fall in the weight room. Hasley was converted from a linebacker to a tight end ahead of the 2023 season. He played in 12 games and made five starts, tallying five receptions for 52 yards with one touchdown.

Hasley started the first two games of the 2024 season, catching a touchdown pass in the season opener against Elon. However, the following week, he was carted off the field after suffering an injury against Northwestern while playing on special teams. It was later confirmed by Blue Devils head coach Manny Diaz that Hasley would miss the rest of the season with a lower leg injury. He finished the season with three receptions for 11 yards and one touchdown in two games.

Hasley returned from injury in 2025 and started all 14 games, recording 40 catches for 454 yards and six touchdowns. He had two touchdown catches, including the deciding score in overtime on fourth down, in a 27–20 upset win over Virginia in the 2025 ACC Championship Game, helping to secure Duke's first outright ACC championship since 1962. Hasley caught another touchdown pass in their season-ending 42–39 win over Arizona State in the 2025 Sun Bowl. He was named the team's offensive MVP and earned All-Atlantic Coast Conference (ACC) honorable mention.

Ahead of the 2026 season, Hasley was named to the John Mackey Award watchlist.

== Personal life ==
Hasley graduated from Duke in May 2026 with a degree in public policy and a certificate in markets and management. He was a multiple-time Academic All-ACC honoree.
