= 2025 Virginia Cavaliers football team =

American college football season

2025 Virginia Cavaliers football

Gator Bowl champion

ACC Championship Game, L 20–27^{OT} vs. Duke

Gator Bowl, W 13–7 vs. Missouri
- Conference: Atlantic Coast Conference

Ranking
- Coaches: No. 16
- AP: No. 16
- Record: 11–3 (7–1 ACC)
- Head coach: Tony Elliott (4th season)
- Offensive coordinator: Desmond Kitchings (4th season)
- Offensive scheme: Spread
- Defensive coordinator: John Rudzinski (4th season)
- Base defense: Multiple 4–2–5
- Home stadium: Scott Stadium

2025 Atlantic Coast Conference football standings
	Conf.			Overall
Team	W		L	W		L
No. 16 Virginia y	7	–	1	11	–	3
Duke y$	6	–	2	9	–	5
No. 2 Miami (FL) ^	6	–	2	13	–	3
Georgia Tech	6	–	2	9	–	4
SMU	6	–	2	9	–	4
Pittsburgh	6	–	2	8	–	5
Louisville	4	–	4	9	–	4
Wake Forest	4	–	4	9	–	4
NC State	4	–	4	8	–	5
California	4	–	4	7	–	6
Clemson	4	–	4	7	–	6
Stanford	3	–	5	4	–	8
Florida State	2	–	6	5	–	7
Virginia Tech	2	–	6	3	–	9
North Carolina	2	–	6	4	–	8
Boston College	1	–	7	2	–	10
Syracuse	1	–	7	3	–	9
Championship: Duke 27, Virginia 20^{OT}
^ – College Football Playoff participant; $ – Conference champion; y – Championship game participant; As of October 19, 2026; Rankings from AP Poll

The 2025 Virginia Cavaliers football team represented the University of Virginia in the Atlantic Coast Conference (ACC) during the 2025 NCAA Division I FBS football season. The Cavaliers were led by Tony Elliott in his fourth year as head coach and played their home games at Scott Stadium in Charlottesville, Virginia.

The Cavaliers had their most successful season to date under Elliott, reaching 11 wins in a season for the first time in program history. Included in their 8–1 start to the season (their best since 1990) was a seven-game winning streak, their longest since 2007. It was the first time in program history that UVA started 5–0 in conference play, a start that included a 46–38 double-overtime home win over No. 8 Florida State on September 26 for their seventh all-time win against an AP Top 10 opponent, their first since 2023, and third such win against FSU. The Cavaliers concluded a 7–1 season in the ACC with a 27–7 home blowout victory over rival Virginia Tech for only their third victory over the Hokies since 1999 and first since 2019. With these successes, the Cavaliers achieved bowl eligibility for the first time since 2021 and played in their second ACC Championship Game. However, with a chance to make it into the College Football Playoff with a win, the Cavaliers were upset by the Duke Blue Devils 27–20 in overtime, allowing Sun Belt champion James Madison to get in instead. They were selected to face Missouri in the Gator Bowl, which they won 13–7, in the process setting the all-time program win record at 11.

Virginia had its first appearances in an AP, Coaches, or College Football Playoff Top 25 poll since 2019, with its initial No. 14 ranking being its highest since the inception of the CFP in 2014. They finished a season ranked in the AP poll for the first time since 2004.

== Schedule ==
Date	Time	Opponent	Rank	Site	TV	Result	Attendance
August 30	12:00 p.m.	Coastal Carolina*		Scott Stadium; Charlottesville, VA	ACCN	W 48–7	46,143
September 6	12:00 p.m.	at NC State (Note: Although both NC State and Virginia are ACC members, this game did not count in the conference standings. The schools scheduled it as a non-conference game because they otherwise meet every two or three years due to it not being a protected matchup.)*		Carter–Finley Stadium; Raleigh, NC	ESPN2	L 31–35	56,919
September 13	12:00 p.m.	William & Mary*		Scott Stadium; Charlottesville, VA	ACCN	W 55–16	38,512
September 20	7:30 p.m.	Stanford		Scott Stadium; Charlottesville, VA	ACCN	W 48–20	36,223
September 26	7:00 p.m.	No. 8 Florida State		Scott Stadium; Charlottesville, VA (Jefferson–Eppes Trophy)	ESPN	W 46–38 ^{2OT}	50,107
October 4	3:30 p.m.	at Louisville	No. 24	L&N Federal Credit Union Stadium; Louisville, KY	ESPN2	W 30–27 ^{OT}	50,032
October 18	6:30 p.m.	Washington State*	No. 18	Scott Stadium; Charlottesville, VA	The CW	W 22–20	56,048
October 25	12:00 p.m.	at North Carolina	No. 16	Kenan Memorial Stadium; Chapel Hill, NC (South's Oldest Rivalry)	ACCN	W 17–16 ^{OT}	50,500
November 1	3:45 p.m.	at California	No. 15	California Memorial Stadium; Berkeley, CA	ESPN2	W 31–21	30,893
November 8	6:30 p.m.	Wake Forest	No. 14	Scott Stadium; Charlottesville, VA	ESPN	L 9–16	55,568
November 15	3:30 p.m.	at Duke	No. 19	Wallace Wade Stadium; Durham, NC	ESPN2	W 34–17	27,215
November 29	7:00 p.m.	Virginia Tech	No. 18	Scott Stadium; Charlottesville, VA (rivalry)	ESPN	W 27–7	58,832
December 6	8:00 p.m.	vs. Duke	No. 17	Bank of America Stadium; Charlotte, NC (ACC Championship Game)	ABC	L 20–27 ^{OT}	41,672
December 27	7:30 p.m.	vs. Missouri*	No. 19	Everbank Stadium; Jacksonville, FL (Gator Bowl)	ABC	W 13–7	31,802
*Non-conference game; Rankings from AP Poll (and CFP Rankings, after November 4) - Released prior to game; All times are in Eastern time; Source:

== Rankings ==
Ranking movements Legend: ██ Increase in ranking ██ Decrease in ranking — = Not ranked RV = Received votes
	Week																
Poll	Pre	1	2	3	4	5	6	7	8	9	10	11	12	13	14	15	Final
AP	—	RV	—	—	—	24	19	18	16	15	12	20	19	17	16	20	16
Coaches	—	—	—	—	—	RV	24	19	16	15	11	19	19	17	16	21	16
CFP	Not released										14	19	19	18	17	19	Not released

== Roster ==
2025 Virginia Cavaliers football team roster
Players
Coaches
Offense

Pos.	#	Name	Class
TE	0	Sage Ennis	GS
WR	1	Suderian Harrison	Jr
WR	2	Andre Greene Jr.	Sr
RB	3	J'Mari Taylor	GS
QB	4	Chandler Morris	GS
WR	5	Kameron Courtney	So
WR	6	Cam Ross	GS
WR	7	Jahmal Edrine	Sr
WR	8	Jayden Thomas	GS
TE	9	Dakota Twitty	Sr
QB	10	Daniel Kaelin	So
WR	11	Trell Harris	Sr
WR	13	Josiah Abdullah	Fr
QB	14	Boone Lourd	So
WR	15	Dillon Newton-Short	Fr
QB	16	Cole Geer	Fr
WR	17	TyLyric Coleman	Jr
QB	18	Bjorn Jurgensen	Fr
QB	19	Grady Brosterhous	Sr
RB	20	Xavier Brown	Sr
RB	21	Harrison Waylee	GS
WR	23	Triston Ward	So
RB	25	Xay Davis	Fr
RB	27	Owen Gardner	GS
RB	28	Noah Vaughn	Jr
RB	29	Davis Lane Jr.	Sr
TE	30	Henry Omohundro	So
RB	37	Jack Stevens	So
WR	45	Brand Morgan	Fr
OL	50	Wallace Unamba	GS
OL	51	Grayson Reid	Fr
OL	52	McKale Boley	Sr
OL	54	Makilan Thomas	GS
OL	55	Jim Harris Jr.	Fr
OL	56	Tyshawn Wyatt	GS
OL	58	Noah Hartsoe	Sr
OL	60	Drake Metcalf	GS
OL	61	Dane Steele	Jr
OL	63	David Wohlabaugh Jr.	GS
OL	64	Cole Surber	Jr
OL	65	Grant Ellinger	So
OL	66	Alex Reisig	So
OL	67	Will Rosen	So
OL	68	Jack Witmer	GS
OL	70	Dane Wleklinski	So
OL	71	Monroe Mills	GS
OL	72	Ben York	So
OL	74	Ethan Sipe	GS
OL	75	Houston Curry	Sr
OL	76	Brady Wilson	GS
OL	77	Noah Josey	GS
OL	78	Kevin Wigenton II	GS
OL	79	Jon Adair	Fr
WR	80	Trevor Ladd	So
TE	81	TeKai Kirby	Jr
WR	82	Eli Wood	Sr
TE	83	Willem Thurber	Fr
WR	84	Isaiah Robinson	Fr
TE	87	Justin Zames	Fr
TE	88	Walker Wallace	GS
TE	89	John Rogers	So
TE	94	Hayden Rollison	Jr

Defense

Pos.	#	Name	Class
S	0	Antonio Clary	GS
LB	1	James Jackson	GS
CB	1	Dre Walker	Jr
LB	2	Stevie Bracey	Sr
CB	3	Kevon Gray	So
DB	4	Christian Charles	GS
LB	5	Kam Robinson	Jr
DE	6	Cazeem Moore	Sr
DB	7	Ja'Maric Morris	GS
DE	8	Mekhi Buchanan	Jr
CB	9	Jam Jackson	Sr
DB	9	Jordan Robinson	GS
DB	10	Ja'Son Prevard	Jr
LB	11	Maddox Marcellus	Jr
LB	13	Myles Brown	So
DE	14	Fisher Camac	Sr
DL	15	Hunter Osborne	Jr
LB	16	Trey McDonald	Sr
DE	17	Mitchell Melton	GS
S	18	Corey Costner	Fr
CB	19	Emmanuel Karnley	Jr
DB	20	Kenan Johnson	GS
S	21	Keke Adams	So
DB	22	Da'Marcus Crosby II	GS
DL	23	Jacob Holmes	Sr
DL	25	Terrell Jones	Sr
S	26	Caleb Hardy	Jr
S	27	Devin Neal	GS
DB	28	Donovan Platt	Sr
CB	29	CJ Spence	Fr
S	30	Ethan Minter	So
S	31	Montino Williams	Fr
LB	32	Landon Danley	Jr
CB	33	Josiah Persinger	Fr
S	34	Kevin Chadwick Jr.	Jr
DB	36	Lukas Sanker	Fr
CB	37	John Hurley	Sr
S	38	Armstrong Jones	So
S	39	Robbie Engelberg	Sr
LB	40	Rob Keys	Jr
LB	42	Isaiah Reese	Fr
LB	43	Logan Kotter	Sr
DE	44	Evan Ward	Fr
LB	45	Justin Rowe	Fr
DE	46	Chase Morrison	So
DE	47	Gabe Sneed	Jr
LB	49	Cayden Cook-Cash	So
DT	51	Sichan John	Fr
DL	52	Daniel Rickert	GS
DE	53	Gavin Johnson	Fr
DT	55	Anthony Britton	Jr
DL	56	Tyler Simmons	So
DE	85	Jewett Hayes	So
DT	90	Jahmeer Carter	GS
DT	91	Jason Hammond	Jr
DE	93	Billy Koudelka	So

Special teams

Pos.	#	Name	Class
P	38	Daniel Sparks	GS
K	41	Will Bettridge	Sr
K	47	Vadin Bruot	Sr
LS	49	Jacob Tannenbaum	Fr
LS	69	Bryce Robinson	GS
K	92	Jorge Diaz Nicolas	Fr
P	99	Elijah Slibeck	Jr

Head coach

- Tony Elliott

Coordinators/assistant coaches

- Des Kitchings – Offensive coordinator/ Tight ends
- John Rudzinski – Defensive coordinator/ Defensive backs
- Keith Gaither – Special teams coordinator/ Running backs
- Kevin Downing – Associate head coach/ Defensive tackles
- Mike Adams – Linebackers
- Curome Cox – Defensive passing game coordinator/ Defensive backs
- Terry Heffernan – Offensive line & offensive run game coordinator
- Taylor Lamb – Quarterbacks
- Adam Mims – Wide receivers
- Chris Slade – Defensive ends
- Mike Moore – Defensive analyst
- Mike Hollins – Graduate assistant
- Jared Rayman – Graduate assistant
- Coy DeWeese – Senior defensive analyst

Legend

- (C) Team captain
- (S) Suspended
- (I) Ineligible
- Injured
- Redshirt

Roster
Last update: July 27, 2025

== Game summaries ==
=== vs Coastal Carolina ===
Coastal Carolina Chanticleers (0–0) at Virginia Cavaliers (0–0) – Game summary

Quarter	1	2	3	4	Total
Chanticleers	0	0	7	0	7
Cavaliers	7	21	14	6	48

at Scott Stadium • Charlottesville, VA

- Date: August 30
- Game time: 6:00 p.m. EDT
- Game weather: Sunny • Temperature: 74 °F (23 °C) • Wind: NE 6 mph
- Game attendance: 46,143
- Referee: Darryl DeBerry
- TV announcers (ACCN): Chris Cotter (play-by-play), Max Browne (analyst), and Kendra Douglas (sideline)
- Box score, Recap

Game information

First quarter

- UVA – J'Mari Taylor 1-yard run (Will Bettridge kick), 0:01. Cavaliers 7–0. Drive: 4 plays, 52 yards, 2:07.

Second quarter

- UVA – Harrison Waylee 1-yard run (Will Bettridge kick), 11:22. Cavaliers 14–0. Drive: 7 plays, 36 yards, 2:27.
- UVA – Cam Ross 29-yard pass from Chandler Morris (Will Bettridge kick), 3:27. Cavaliers 21–0. Drive: 7 plays, 90 yards, 2:51.
- UVA – Jahmal Edrine 2-yard pass from Chandler Morris (Will Bettridge kick), 0:18. Cavaliers 28–0. Drive: 8 plays, 80 yards, 1:16.

Third quarter

- UVA – J'Mari Taylor 2-yard run (Will Bettridge kick), 10:41. Cavaliers 35–0. Drive: 8 plays, 60 yards, 3:58.
- CCU – Ja'Vin Simpkins 8-yard run (Kian Afrookhteh kick), 4:26. Cavaliers 35–7. Drive: 14 plays, 79 yards, 6:11.
- UVA – Cam Ross 100-yard kickoff return (Will Bettridge kick), 4:12. Cavaliers 42–7.

Fourth quarter

- UVA – Will Bettridge 32-yard field goal, 11:13. Cavaliers 45–7. Drive: 15 plays, 53 yards, 5:15.
- UVA – Will Bettridge 41-yard field goal, 7:03. Cavaliers 48–7. Drive: 4 plays, 8 yards, 1:48.

Statistics	CCU	UVA
First downs	13	23
Plays–yards	67–254	79–454
Rushes–yards	30–91	43–164
Passing yards	163	290
Passing: Comp–Att–Int	20–37–1	22–36–0
Turnovers	1	0
Time of possession	26:27	33:33

Team	Category	Player	Statistics
Coastal Carolina	Passing	MJ Morris	20/36, 163 yards, INT
Coastal Carolina	Rushing	Dominic Knicely	7 carries, 27 yards
Coastal Carolina	Receiving	Brooks Johnson	2 receptions, 36 yards
Virginia	Passing	Chandler Morris	19/27, 264 yards, 2 TD
Virginia	Rushing	Chandler Morris	5 carries, 50 yards
Virginia	Receiving	Cam Ross	7 receptions, 124 yards, TD

=== at NC State ===
Virginia Cavaliers (1–0) at NC State Wolfpack (1–0) – Game summary

Quarter	1	2	3	4	Total
Cavaliers	14	10	7	0	31
Wolfpack	7	7	21	0	35

at Carter–Finley Stadium • Raleigh, NC

- Date: September 6
- Game time: 12:00 p.m. EDT
- Game weather: Sunny, 86 °F (30 °C), SW 7mph
- Game attendance: 56,919
- Referee: Jon Noli
- TV announcers (ESPN2): Bob Wischusen (play-by-play), Sam Acho (analyst), and Taylor Davis (sideline)

Game information

First quarter

- UVA – J'Mari Taylor 39-yard run (Will Bettridge kick), 10:37. Cavaliers 7–0. Drive: 10 plays, 75 yards, 4:23.
- NCST – CJ Bailey 30-yard run (Kanoah Vinesett kick), 8:26. Tied 7–7. Drive: 5 plays, 75 yards, 2:11.
- UVA – J'Mari Taylor 9-yard run (Will Bettridge kick), 3:41. Cavaliers 14–7. Drive: 12 plays, 75 yards, 4:45.

Second quarter

- NCST – Noah Rogers 27-yard pass from CJ Bailey (Kanoah Vinesett kick), 14:23. Tied 14–14. Drive: 9 plays, 75 yards, 4:18.
- UVA – Will Bettridge 29-yard field goal, 4:08. Cavaliers 17–14. Drive: 11 plays, 59 yards, 6:12.
- UVA – Sage Ennis 3-yard pass from Chandler Morris (Will Bettridge kick), 0:17. Cavaliers 24–14. Drive: 7 plays, 27 yards, 2:47.

Third quarter

- NCST – Hollywood Smothers 14-yard run (Kanoah Vinesett kick), 10:46. Cavaliers 24–21. Drive: 8 plays, 75 yards, 4:14.
- NCST – CJ Bailey 12-yard run (Kanoah Vinesett kick), 6:39. Wolfpack 28–24. Drive: 5 plays, 80 yards, 2:41.
- UVA – J'Mari Taylor 66-yard run (Will Bettridge kick), 5:11. Cavaliers 31–28. Drive: 3 plays, 75 yards, 1:28.
- NCST – Hollywood Smothers 9-yard run (Kanoah Vinesett kick), 0:45. Wolfpack 35–31. Drive: 9 plays, 75 yards, 4:26.

Fourth quarter

- No scoring plays.

Statistics	UVA	NCSU
First downs	24	22
Plays–yards	76–514	65–416
Rushes–yards	32–257	35–216
Passing yards	30–257	16–200
Passing: comp–att–int	30–43–1	16–23–0
Turnovers	1	0
Time of possession	32:25	27:35

Team	Category	Player	Statistics
Virginia	Passing	Chandler Morris	30/43, 257 yards, TD, INT
Virginia	Rushing	J'Mari Taylor	17 carries, 150 yards, 3 TD
Virginia	Receiving	Jahmal Edrine	6 receptions, 68 yards
NC State	Passing	CJ Bailey	16/23, 200 yards, TD
NC State	Rushing	Hollywood Smothers	17 carries, 140 yards, 2 TD
NC State	Receiving	Terrell Anderson	3 receptions, 44 yards

=== vs William & Mary (FCS) ===
William & Mary Tribe (FCS) (1–1) at Virginia Cavaliers (1–1) – Game summary

Quarter	1	2	3	4	Total
Tribe (FCS)	0	7	7	2	16
Cavaliers	14	28	10	3	55

at Scott Stadium • Charlottesville, Virginia

- Date: September 13
- Game time: 12:00 p.m. EDT
- Game weather:
- Game attendance: 38,512
- Referee: Garrett Dickerson
- TV announcers (ACCN): Matt Schumacker (play-by-play), Dustin Fox (analyst), and Ashley Stroehlein (sideline)

Game information

First quarter

- UVA – Kameron Courtney 23-yard run (Will Bettridge kick), 10:46. Cavaliers 7–0. Drive: 10 plays, 75 yards, 4:14.
- UVA – J'Mari Taylor 1-yard run (Will Bettridge kick), 5:23. Cavaliers 14–0. Drive: 10 plays, 79 yards, 3:10.

Second quarter

- UVA – Xavier Brown 4-yard run (Will Bettridge kick), 13:18. Cavaliers 21–0. Drive: 8 plays, 78 yards, 2:57.
- W&M – Deven Thompson 79-yard pass from Tyler Hughes (Keegan Shackford kick), 13:01. Cavaliers 21–7. Drive: 1 play, 79 yards, 0:11.
- UVA – Harrison Waylee 2-yard run (Will Bettridge kick), 9:27. Cavaliers 28–7. Drive: 7 plays, 73 yards, 3:22.
- UVA – John Rogers 3-yard pass from Chandler Morris (Will Bettridge kick), 6:01. Cavaliers 35–7. Drive: 5 plays, 34 yards, 1:48.
- UVA – Harrison Waylee 8-yard run (Will Bettridge kick), 1:59. Cavaliers 42–7. Drive: 5 plays, 80 yards, 1:59.

Third quarter

- UVA – Harrison Waylee 97-yard run (Will Bettridge kick), 11:31. Cavaliers 49–7. Drive: 1 play, 97 yards, 0:15.
- UVA – Will Bettridge 24-yard field goal, 6:46. Cavaliers 52–7. Drive: 9 plays, 71 yards, 3:15.
- W&M – Noah Brannock 6-yard run (Keegan Shackford kick), 2:13. Cavaliers 52–14. Drive: 5 plays, 53 yards, 1:21.

Fourth quarter

- UVA – Will Bettridge 31-yard field goal, 12:58. Cavaliers 55–14. Drive: 8 plays, 38 yards, 4:08.
- W&M – Team Safety, 7:59. Cavaliers 55–16.

Statistics	W&M	UVA
First downs	7	30
Plays–yards	79–263	87–700
Rushes–yards	24–59	52–379
Passing yards	204	321
Passing: comp–att–int	13–25–0	23–35–1
Turnovers	0	1
Time of possession	22:24	37:36

Team	Category	Player	Statistics
William & Mary	Passing	Noah Brannock	8/17, 111 yards
William & Mary	Rushing	Noah Brannock	9 carries, 35 yards, TD
William & Mary	Receiving	Deven Thompson	5 receptions, 108 yards, TD
Virginia	Passing	Daniel Kaelin	8/14, 164 yards, INT
Virginia	Rushing	Harrison Waylee	10 carries, 151 yards, 3 TD
Virginia	Receiving	Kameron Courtney	4 receptions, 67 yards

=== vs Stanford ===
Stanford Cardinal (1–2) at Virginia Cavaliers (2–1) – Game summary

Quarter	1	2	3	4	Total
Cardinal	7	7	6	0	20
Cavaliers	21	7	10	10	48

at Scott Stadium • Charlottesville, VA

- Date: September 20
- Game time: 7:30 p.m. EDT
- Game weather:
- Game attendance: 36,223
- Referee: Adam Savoie
- TV announcers (ACCN): Wes Durham (play-by-play), Steve Addazio (analyst), and Dana Boyle (sideline)

Game information

First quarter

- UVA – Trell Harris 3-yard pass from Chandler Morris (Will Bettridge kick), 11:08. Cavaliers 7–0. Drive: 7 plays, 65 yards, 2:26.
- STAN – Benji Blackburn 5-yard pass from Ben Gulbranson (Emmet Kenney kick), 8:27. Tied 7–7. Drive: 5 plays, 76 yards, 2:36.
- UVA – Trell Harris 75-yard pass from Chandler Morris (Will Bettridge kick), 8:17. Cavaliers 14–7. Drive: 1 play, 75 yards, 0:10.
- UVA – Trell Harris 27-yard pass from Chandler Morris (Will Bettridge kick), 3:36. Cavaliers 21–7. Drive: 7 plays, 72 yards, 3:20.

Second quarter

- UVA – Chandler Morris 13-yard run (Will Bettridge kick), 9:05. Cavaliers 28–7. Drive: 12 plays, 88 yards, 6:00.
- STAN – Micah Ford 3-yard run (Emmet Kenney kick), 0:55. Cavaliers 28–14. Drive: 8 plays, 80 yards, 1:29.

Third quarter

- UVA – Sage Ennis 13-yard pass from Chandler Morris (Will Bettridge kick), 11:21. Cavaliers 35–14. Drive: 7 plays, 68 yards, 3:32.
- UVA – Will Bettridge 28-yard field goal, 5:35. Cavaliers 38–14. Drive: 7 plays, 29 yards, 3:51.
- STAN – Bryce Farrell 68-yard pass from Ben Gulbranson (pass failed), 4:18. Cavaliers 38–20. Drive: 3 plays, 75 yards, 1:17.

Fourth quarter

- UVA – Will Bettridge 26-yard field goal, 12:26. Cavaliers 41–20. Drive: 9 plays, 52 yards, 3:50.
- UVA – Eli Wood 4-yard pass from Daniel Kaelin (Will Bettridge kick), 4:26. Cavaliers 48–20. Drive: 8 plays, 36 yards, 5:09.

Statistics	STAN	UVA
First downs	15	29
Plays–yards	66–323	72–564
Rushes–yards	30–37	40–210
Passing yards	286	384
Passing: comp–att–int	20–29–0	24–32–0
Turnovers	1	0
Time of possession	25:12	34:48

Team	Category	Player	Statistics
Stanford	Passing	Ben Gulbranson	20/29, 286 yards, 2 TD
Stanford	Rushing	Micah Ford	13 carries, 44 yards, TD
Stanford	Receiving	Bryce Farrell	4 receptions, 135 yards, TD
Virginia	Passing	Chandler Morris	23/31, 380 yards, 4 TD
Virginia	Rushing	J'Mari Taylor	15 carries, 85 yards
Virginia	Receiving	Trell Harris	4 receptions, 145 yards, 3 TD

=== vs No. 8 Florida State (Jefferson–Eppes Trophy) ===
No. 8 Florida State Seminoles (3–0) at Virginia Cavaliers (3–1) – Game summary

Quarter	1	2	3	4	OT	2OT	Total
No. 8 Seminoles	0	21	7	7	3	0	38
Cavaliers	7	14	7	7	3	8	46

at Scott Stadium • Charlottesville, VA

- Date: September 26
- Game time: 7:00 p.m. EDT
- Game weather: Cloudy • Temperature: 77 °F (25 °C) • Wind: NE at 5 miles per hour (8.0 km/h)
- Game attendance: 50,107
- Referee: Nate Black
- TV announcers (ESPN): Bob Wischusen (play-by-play), Louis Riddick (analyst), and Kris Budden (sideline)

Game information

First quarter

- UVA - Sage Ennis 6-yard pass from Chandler Morris (Will Bettridge kick), 5:05. Cavaliers 7–0. Drive: 7 plays, 38 yards, 2:28.

Second quarter

- UVA - Chandler Morris 11-yard run (Will Bettridge kick), 9:43. Cavaliers 14–0. Drive: 15 plays, 81 yards, 7:04.
- FSU - Gavin Sawchuk 2-yard run (Jake Weinberg kick), 6:52. Cavaliers 14–7. Drive: 7 plays, 75 yards, 2:51.
- FSU - Randy Pittman Jr. 2-yard run (Jake Weinberg kick), 5:29. Tied 14–14. Drive: 4 plays, 27 yards, 1:11.
- FSU - Tommy Castellanos 4-yard run (Jake Weinberg kick), 2:32. Seminoles 21–14. Drive: 6 plays, 45 yards, 2:04.
- UVA - J'Mari Taylor 26-yard run (Will Bettridge kick), 0:48. Tied 21–21. Drive: 7 plays, 75 yards, 1:44.

Third quarter

- UVA - Chandler Morris 7-yard run (Will Bettridge kick), 3:45. Cavaliers 28–21. Drive: 12 plays, 74 yards, 6:13.
- FSU - Duce Robinson 4-yard pass from Randy Pittman (Jake Weinberg kick), 0:18. Tied 28–28. Drive: 7 plays, 75 yards, 3:27.

Fourth quarter

- UVA - Xavier Brown 15-yard pass from Chandler Morris (Will Bettridge kick), 7:20. Cavaliers 35–28. Drive: 16 plays, 75 yards, 7:58.
- FSU - Randy Pittman Jr. 11-yard pass from Tommy Castellanos (Jake Weinberg kick), 0:36. Tied 35–35. Drive: 8 plays, 67 yards, 1:42.

Overtime

- FSU - Jake Weinberg 36-yard field goal. Seminoles 38–35. Drive: 4 plays, 7 yards.
- UVA - Will Bettridge 39-yard field goal. Tied 38–38. Drive: 4 plays, 3 yards.

Double Overtime

- UVA - Chandler Morris 4-yard run (Chandler Morris–Trell Harris pass). Cavaliers 46–38. Drive: 4 plays, 25 yards.

Statistics	FSU	UVA
First downs	24	27
Plays–yards	81–514	84–440
Rushes–yards	48–256	48–211
Passing yards	258	229
Passing: comp–att–int	19–33–2	26–36–3
Turnovers	3	3
Time of possession	28:03	31:57

Team	Category	Player	Statistics
Florida State	Passing	Thomas Castellanos	18/32, 254 yards, TD, 2 INT
Florida State	Rushing	Thomas Castellanos	14 carries, 78 yards, TD
Florida State	Receiving	Duce Robinson	9 receptions, 147 yards, TD
Virginia	Passing	Chandler Morris	26/35, 229 yards, 2 TD, 3 INT
Virginia	Rushing	J'Mari Taylor	27 carries, 99 yards, TD
Virginia	Receiving	Jahmal Edrine	5 receptions, 45 yards

=== at Louisville ===
No. 24 Virginia Cavaliers (4–1) at Louisville Cardinals (4–0) – Game summary

Quarter	1	2	3	4	OT	Total
No. 24 Cavaliers	7	7	10	0	6	30
Cardinals	7	7	0	10	3	27

at L&N Federal Credit Union Stadium • Louisville, KY

- Date: October 4
- Game time: 3:30 p.m. EDT
- Game weather: Sunny • Temperature: 82 °F (28 °C) • Wind: NW at 5 miles per hour (8.0 km/h)
- Game attendance: 50,032
- Referee: Tim Hedgepeth
- TV announcers (ESPN2): Mike Monaco (play-by-play), Kirk Morrison (analyst), and Dawn Davenport (sideline)

Game information

First quarter

- (6:12) UVA – Donavon Platt 62-yard fumble return (Will Bettridge kick) (Virginia 7–0)
- (0:00) LOU – Miller Moss 1-yard run (Cooper Ranvier kick) (Drive: 12 plays, 75 yards, 6:11; Tied 7–7)

Second quarter

- (6:56) UVA – Cam Ross 19-yard pass from Chandler Morris (Will Bettridge kick) (Drive: 16 plays, 75 yards, 8:04; Virginia 14–7)
- (3:26) LOU – Chris Bell 15-yard pass from Miller Moss (Cooper Ranvier kick) (Drive: 7 plays, 70 yards, 3:30; Tied 14–14)

Third quarter

- (6:25) UVA – Donavon Platt 47-yard interception return (Will Bettridge kick) (Virginia 21–14)
- (0:30) UVA – Will Bettridge 46-yard field goal (Drive: 5 plays, 11 yards, 1:13; Virginia 24–14)

Fourth quarter

- (9:41) LOU – Chris Bell 13-yard pass from Miller Moss (Cooper Ranvier kick) (Drive: 6 plays, 55 yards, 2:48; Virginia 24–21)
- (1:08) LOU – Cooper Ranvier 50-yard field goal (Drive: 10 plays, 40 yards, 3:23; Tied 24–24)

Overtime

- LOU – Cooper Ranvier 24-yard field goal (Drive: 5 plays, 19 yards; Louisville 27–24)
- UVA – J'Mari Taylor 2-yard run (Drive: 4 plays, 25 yards; Virginia 30–27)

Statistics	UVA	LOU
First downs	14	25
Plays–yards	63–237	75–383
Rushes–yards	32–123	27–103
Passing yards	149	329
Passing: comp–att–int	19–31–0	34–48–1
Turnovers	0	2
Time of possession	27:41	32:19

Team	Category	Player	Statistics
Virginia	Passing	Chandler Morris	19/31, 149 yards, TD
Virginia	Rushing	J'Mari Taylor	16 carries, 86 yards, TD
Virginia	Receiving	Cam Ross	4 receptions, 43 yards, TD
Louisville	Passing	Miller Moss	34/48, 329 yards, 2 TD, INT
Louisville	Rushing	Isaac Brown	13 carries, 66 yards
Louisville	Receiving	Chris Bell	12 receptions, 170 yards, 2 TD

=== vs Washington State ===
Washington State Cougars (3–3) at No. 18 Virginia Cavaliers (5–1) – Game summary

Quarter	1	2	3	4	Total
Cougars	7	10	3	0	20
No. 18 Cavaliers	7	0	3	12	22

at Scott Stadium • Charlottesville, VA

- Date: October 18
- Game time: 6:30 p.m. EDT
- Game weather: Sunny, 70 °F (21 °C)
- Game attendance: 56,048
- Referee: Riley Johnson
- TV announcers (The CW): Thom Brennaman (play-by-play), Will Blackmon (analyst), and Wes Bryant (sideline)

Game information

First quarter

- WSU - Joshua Meredith 32-yard pass from Zevi Eckhaus (Jack Stevens kick), 9:47. Cougars 7-0, Drive: 7 plays, 78 yards, 4:02.
- UVA - Cam Ross 19-yard run (Will Bettridge kick), 4:48. Tied 7-7, Drive: 5 plays, 59 yards, 2:02.

Second quarter

- WSU - Zevi Eckhaus 1-yard run (Jack Stevens kick), 6:35. Cougars 14-7, Drive: 8 plays, 64 yards, 5:01.
- WSU - Jack Stevens 37-yard field goal, 0:35. Cougars 17-7, Drive: 11 plays, 62 yards, 4:21.

Third quarter

- UVA - Will Bettridge 47-yard field goal, 8:38. Cougars 17-10, Drive: 9 plays, 46 yards, 4:16.
- WSU – Jack Stevens 42-yard field goal, 2:18. Cougars 20-10, Drive: 12 plays, 50 yards, 6:20.

Fourth quarter

- UVA - Harrison Waylee 2-yard run (Will Bettridge kick), 9:45. Cougars 20-17, Drive: 9 plays, 97 yards, 3:41.
- UVA - Will Bettridge 34-yard field goal, 2:55. Tied 20-20, Drive: 7 plays, 18 yards, 4:14.
- UVA - Team Safety, 2:41. Cavaliers 22-20, Drive: 3 plays, -2 yards, 0:14.

Statistics	WSU	UVA
First downs	18	13
Plays–yards	62–326	57–301
Rushes–yards	35–143	32–122
Passing yards	183	179
Passing: comp–att–int	18–27–2	15–25–0
Turnovers	2	0
Time of possession	34:14	25:46

Team	Category	Player	Statistics
Washington State	Passing	Zevi Eckhaus	18/27, 183 yards, TD, 2 INT
Washington State	Rushing	Kirby Vorhees	16 carries, 45 yards
Washington State	Receiving	Joshua Meredith	7 catches, 108 yards, TD
Virginia	Passing	Chandler Morris	15/25, 179 yards
Virginia	Rushing	J'Mari Taylor	17 carries, 47 yards
Virginia	Receiving	Jahmal Edrine	5 catches, 102 yards

=== at North Carolina (South's Oldest Rivalry) ===
No. 16 Virginia Cavaliers (6–1) at North Carolina Tar Heels (2–4) – Game summary

Quarter	1	2	3	4	OT	Total
No. 16 Cavaliers	3	7	0	0	7	17
Tar Heels	0	10	0	0	6	16

at Kenan Stadium • Chapel Hill, NC

- Date: October 25
- Game time: 12:00 p.m. EDT
- Game weather:
- Game attendance: 50,500
- Referee: Darryl DeBerry
- TV announcers (ACCN): Wes Durham (play-by-play), Steve Addazio (analyst), and Dana Boyle (sideline)

Game information

First quarter

- (4:33) UVA – Will Bettridge 34-yard field goal (Drive: 9 plays, 63 yards, 3:52; Virgina 3–0)

Second quarter

- (11:30) UNC – Rece Verhoff 34-yard field goal (Drive:12 plays, 69 yards, 5:35; Tied 3–3)
- (6:36) UVA – Trell Harris 30-yard pass from Chandler Morris, Will Bettridge kick (Drive: 6 plays, 60 yards, 2:10; Virgina 10–3)
- (1:24) UNC – Gio Lopez 1-yard run, Rece Verhoff kick (Drive: 6 plays, 60 yards, 2:10; Tied 10–10)

Third quarter

- No scoring plays.

Fourth quarter

- No scoring plays.

Overtime

- UVA – J'Mari Taylor 1-yard run, Will Bettridge kick (Drive: 7 plays, 25 yards; Virgina 17–10)
- UVA – Davion Gause 9-yard pass from Gio Lopez, pass failed (Drive: 5 plays, 25 yards, 2:10; Virgina 17–16)

Statistics	UVA	UNC
First downs	16	20
Plays–yards	69–259	75–353
Rushes–yards	34–59	39–145
Passing yards	200	208
Passing: comp–att–int	20–35–1	23–36–2
Turnovers	1	3
Time of possession	24:27	32:33

Team	Category	Player	Statistics
Virginia	Passing	Chandler Morris	20/35, 200 yards, TD, INT
Virginia	Rushing	J'Mari Taylor	21 carries, 69 yards, TD
Virginia	Receiving	Jahmal Edrine	6 catches, 75 yards
North Carolina	Passing	Gio Lopez	23/36, 208 yards, TD, 2 INT
North Carolina	Rushing	Benjamin Hall	11 carries, 50 yards
North Carolina	Receiving	Jordan Shipp	7 catches, 67 yards

=== at California ===
No. 15 Virginia Cavaliers (7–1) at California Golden Bears (5–3) – Game summary

Quarter	1	2	3	4	Total
No. 15 Cavaliers	10	7	7	7	31
Golden Bears	0	7	7	7	21

at California Memorial Stadium • Berkeley, CA

- Date: November 1
- Game time: 3:45 p.m. EDT
- Game weather: Temperature: 66 °F (19 °C) • Wind: W at 4 miles per hour (6.4 km/h) • Weather: Sunny
- Game attendance: 30,893
- Referee: Justin Elliott
- TV announcers (ESPN2): Mike Couzens (play-by-play), Kirk Morrison (analyst), and Dawn Davenport (sideline)

Game information

First quarter

- (11:58) UVA – J'Mari Taylor 25-yard run, Will Bettridge kick (Drive: 8 plays, 75 yards, 2:58 Virginia 7–0)
- (5:21) UVA – Will Bettridge 26-yard field goal (Drive: 11 plays, 67 yards, 4:10 Virginia 10–0)

Second quarter

- (13:01) CAL – Kendrick Raphael 2-yard run, Chase Meyer kick (Drive: 14 plays, 75 yards, 7:20 Virginia 10–7)
- (5:21) UVA – J'Mari Taylor 5-yard run, Will Bettridge kick (Drive: 14 plays, 75 yards, 7:40 Virginia 17–7)

Third quarter

- (6:08) CAL – Kendrick Raphael 42-yard pass from Mason Mini, Chase Meyer kick (Drive: 1 play, 42 yards, 0:08 Virginia 17–14)
- (1:51) UVA – Eli Wood 3-yard run, Will Bettridge kick (Drive: 11 plays, 75 yards, 4:17 Virginia 24–14)

Fourth quarter

- (12:57) CAL – Kendrick Raphael 1-yard run, Chase Meyer kick (Drive:2 plays, 25 yards, 0:36 Virginia 24–21)
- (0:34) UVA – Kam Robinson 35 yd interception, Will Bettridge kick (Virginia 31–21)

Statistics	UVA	CAL
First downs	23	14
Plays–yards	80–456	57–263
Rushes–yards	44–194	25–8
Passing yards	262	255
Passing: comp–att–int	24–36–0	20–32–2
Turnovers	0	2
Time of possession	35:26	24:34

Team	Category	Player	Statistics
Virginia	Passing	Chandler Morris	24/36, 262 yards
Virginia	Rushing	J'Mari Taylor	21 carries, 105 yards, 2 TD
Virginia	Receiving	Trell Harris	5 catches, 68 yards
California	Passing	Jaron-Keawe Sagapolutele	19/30, 213 yards, 2 INT
California	Rushing	Kendrick Raphael	13 carries, 46 yards
California	Receiving	Trond Grizzell	8 catches, 80 yards

=== vs Wake Forest ===
Wake Forest Demon Deacons (5–3) at No. 14 Virginia Cavaliers (8–1) – Game summary

Quarter	1	2	3	4	Total
Demon Deacons	0	10	3	3	16
No. 14 Cavaliers	3	3	3	0	9

at Scott Stadium • Charlottesville, VA

- Date: November 8
- Game time: 7:00 p.m. EST
- Game weather:
- Game attendance: 55,568
- Referee: Nate Black
- TV announcers (ESPN): Mark Jones (play-by-play), Roddy Jones (analyst), and Quint Kessenich (sideline)

Game information

First quarter

- UVA – Will Bettridge 34-yard field goal, 11:48. Cavaliers 3–0. Drive: 4 plays, 7 yards, 1:18.

Second quarter

- UVA – Will Bettridge 21-yard field goal, 4:27. Cavaliers 6–0. Drive: 9 plays, 91 yards, 4:46.
- WAKE – Carlos Hernandez 88-yard punt return (Connor Calvert kick), 1:33. Demon Deacons 7–6.
- WAKE – Connor Calvert 39-yard field goal, 0:40. Demon Deacons 10–6. Drive: 4 plays, 9 yards, 0:27.

Third quarter

- UVA – Will Bettridge 40-yard field goal, 10:35. Demon Deacons 10–9. Drive: 9 plays, 58 yards, 4:20.
- WAKE – Connor Calvert 50-yard field goal, 3:49. Demon Deacons 13–9. Drive: 6 plays, 16 yards, 1:53.

Fourth quarter

- WAKE – Connor Calvert 49-yard field goal, 3:53. Demon Deacons 16–9. Drive: 16 plays, 48 yards, 9:16.

Statistics	WAKE	UVA
First downs	12	13
Plays–yards	64–203	64–327
Rushes–yards	41–139	30–163
Passing yards	64	164
Passing: comp–att–int	9–23–0	21–34–0
Turnovers	0	3
Time of possession	31:42	28:18

Team	Category	Player	Statistics
Wake Forest	Passing	Robby Ashford	7/16, 46 yards
Wake Forest	Rushing	Demond Claiborne	25 carries, 75 yards
Wake Forest	Receiving	Ty Clark	1 catch, 22 yards
Virginia	Passing	Daniel Kaelin	18/28, 145 yards
Virginia	Rushing	J'Mari Taylor	19 carries, 98 yards
Virginia	Receiving	Trell Harris	6 catches, 60 yards

=== at Duke ===
No. 19 Virginia Cavaliers (8–2) at Duke Blue Devils (5–4) – Game summary

Quarter	1	2	3	4	Total
No. 19 Cavaliers	7	10	14	3	34
Blue Devils	0	3	0	14	17

at Wallace Wade Stadium • Durham, NC

- Date: November 15
- Game time: 3:30 p.m. EST
- Game weather: Sunny
- Game attendance: 27,215
- Referee: Adam Savoie
- TV announcers (ESPN2): Mike Monaco (play-by-play), Kirk Morrison (analyst), and Dawn Davenport (sideline)

Game information

First quarter

- UVA – J'Mari Taylor 5-yard run (Will Bettridge kick), 8:13. Cavaliers 7–0. Drive: 14 plays, 75 yards, 6:47.

Second quarter

- DUKE – Todd Pelino 49-yard field goal, 5:33. Cavaliers 7–3. Drive: 11 plays, 33 yards, 5:49.
- UVA – Sage Ennis 12-yard pass from Chandler Morris (Will Bettridge kick), 1:39. Cavaliers 14–3. Drive: 9 plays, 75 yards, 3:54.
- UVA – Will Bettridge 44-yard field goal, 0:00. Cavaliers 17–3. Drive: 6 plays, 42 yards, 1:00.

Third quarter

- UVA – Trell Harris 20-yard pass from Chandler Morris (Will Bettridge kick), 6:49. Cavaliers 24–3. Drive: 10 plays, 87 yards, 5:08.
- UVA – J'Mari Taylor 78-yard run (Will Bettridge kick), 2:27. Cavaliers 31–3. Drive: 3 plays, 86 yards, 1:32.

Fourth quarter

- DUKE – Cooper Barkate 11-yard pass from Darian Mensah (Todd Pelino kick), 10:23. Cavaliers 31–10. Drive: 12 plays, 72 yards, 3:42.
- DUKE – Tre Freeman 18-yard interception return (Todd Pelino kick), 9:30. Cavaliers 31–17.
- UVA – Will Bettridge 42-yard field goal, 5:42. Cavaliers 34–17. Drive: 7 plays, 50 yards, 3:48.

Statistics	UVA	DUKE
First downs	22	11
Plays–yards	77–540	58–255
Rushes–yards	42–224	23–42
Passing yards	316	213
Passing: comp–att–int	23–35–2	18–35–0
Turnovers	2	1
Time of possession	35:58	24:02

Team	Category	Player	Statistics
Virginia	Passing	Chandler Morris	23/35, 316 yards, 2 TD, 2 INT
Virginia	Rushing	J'Mari Taylor	18 carries, 133 yards, 2 TD
Virginia	Receiving	Trell Harris	8 catches, 161 yards, TD
Duke	Passing	Darian Mensah	18/35, 213 yards, TD
Duke	Rushing	Nate Sheppard	12 carries, 43 yards
Duke	Receiving	Landen King	2 catches, 48 yards

=== vs Virginia Tech (rivalry) ===
Virginia Tech Hokies (3–8) at No. 18 Virginia Cavaliers (9–2) – Game summary

Quarter	1	2	3	4	Total
Hokies	0	0	0	7	7
No. 18 Cavaliers	7	7	10	3	27

at Scott Stadium • Charlottesville, VA

- Date: November 29
- Game time: 7:00 p.m. EST
- Game weather: Clear, 34 °F (1 °C)
- Game attendance: 58,832
- Referee: Mike Roche
- TV announcers (ESPN): Mike Monaco (play-by-play), Kirk Morrison (analyst), and Dawn Davenport (sideline)

Game information

First quarter

- UVA – J'Mari Taylor 1-yard run (Will Bettridge kick), 7:26. Cavaliers 7–0. Drive: 6 plays, 46 yards, 3:12.

Second quarter

- UVA – Sage Ennis 1-yard pass from J'Mari Taylor (Will Bettridge kick), 4:33. Cavaliers 14–0. Drive: 11 plays, 80 yards, 5:04.

Third quarter

- UVA – Will Bettridge 27-yard field goal, 7:28. Cavaliers 17–0. Drive: 11 plays, 39 yards, 3:40.
- UVA – Chandler Morris 8-yard run (Will Bettridge kick), 0:46. Cavaliers 24–0. Drive: 12 plays, 74 yards, 5:02.

Fourth quarter

- UVA – Will Bettridge 32-yard field goal, 6:24. Cavaliers 27–0. Drive: 6 plays, 22 yards, 2:52.
- VT – Shamarius Peterkin 57-yard pass from Kyron Drones (John Love kick), 4:21. Cavaliers 27–7. Drive: 5 plays, 75 yards, 2:03.

Statistics	VT	UVA
First downs	6	25
Plays–yards	47–197	83–380
Rushes–yards	31–119	47–197
Passing yards	78	183
Passing: comp–att–int	4–16–2	22–36–0
Turnovers	2	0
Time of possession	23:04	36:56

Team	Category	Player	Statistics
Virginia Tech	Passing	Kyron Drones	4/16, 78 yards, TD, 2 INT
Virginia Tech	Rushing	Jeffrey Overton Jr.	11 carries, 53 yards
Virginia Tech	Receiving	Shamarius Peterkin	1 catch, 57 yards, TD
Virginia	Passing	Chandler Morris	21/35, 182 yards
Virginia	Rushing	J'Mari Taylor	20 carries, 80 yards, TD
Virginia	Receiving	Kam Courtney	6 catches, 50 yards

=== vs. Duke (ACC Championship Game) ===
2025 ACC Championship Game
Duke Blue Devils (7–5) vs. No. 17 Virginia Cavaliers (10–2) – Game summary

Quarter	1	2	3	4	OT	Total
Blue Devils	7	7	3	3	7	27
No. 17 Cavaliers	0	7	3	10	0	20

at Bank of America Stadium • Charlotte, NC

- Date: December 6
- Game time: 8:00 p.m. EST
- Game weather: Cloudy • Temperature: 39 °F (4 °C) • Wind: W at 1 mile per hour (1.6 km/h)
- Game attendance: 41,672
- Referee: Jerry Magallanes
- TV announcers (ABC): Sean McDonough (play-by-play), Greg McElroy (analyst), Molly McGrath and Taylor McGregor (sideline reporters)

Game information

First quarter

- DUKE – Jeremiah Halsey 12-yard pass from Darian Mensah (Todd Pelino kick), 10:40. Blue Devils 7–0. Drive: 15 plays, 75 yards, 9:38.

Second quarter

- UVA – J'Mari Taylor 11-yard pass from Chandler Morris (Will Bettridge kick), 14:16. Tied 7–7. Drive: 3 plays, 23 yards, 1:31.
- DUKE – Nate Sheppard 16-yard run (Todd Pelino kick), 6:14. Blue Devils 14–7. Drive: 13 plays, 75 yards, 8:02.

Third quarter

- UVA – Will Bettridge 24-yard field goal, 7:19. Blue Devils 14–10. Drive: 17 plays, 68 yards, 7:41.
- DUKE – Todd Pelino 29-yard field goal, 3:53. Blue Devils 17–10. Drive: 6 plays, 63 yards, 3:26.

Fourth quarter

- DUKE – Todd Pelino 23-yard field goal, 5:02. Blue Devils 20–10. Drive: 5 plays, 28 yards, 2:19.
- UVA – Will Bettridge 42-yard field goal, 3:54. Blue Devils 20–13. Drive: 8 plays, 50 yards, 1:08.
- UVA – Eli Wood 18-yard pass from Chandler Morris (Will Bettridge kick), 0:22. Tied 20–20. Drive: 10 plays, 96 yards, 1:22.

Overtime

- DUKE – Jeremiah Hasley 1-yard run (Todd Pelino kick). Blue Devils 27–20. Drive: 7 plays, 25 yards.

Statistics	DUKE	UVA
First downs	19	25
Plays–yards	69–333	69–344
Rushes–yards	44–137	29–128
Passing yards	196	216
Passing: comp–att–int	19–25–1	21–40–2
Turnovers	1	2
Time of possession	34:24	25:36

Team	Category	Player	Statistics
Duke	Passing	Darian Mensah	19–25, 196 yards, 2 TD, INT
Duke	Rushing	Nate Sheppard	21 carries, 97 yards, TD
Duke	Receiving	Cooper Barkate	5 receptions, 91 yards
Virginia	Passing	Chandler Morris	21–40, 216 yards, 2 TD, 2 INT
Virginia	Rushing	Harrison Waylee	11 carries, 66 yards
Virginia	Receiving	Cam Ross	5 receptions, 59 yards

=== vs. Missouri (Gator Bowl) ===
2025 TaxSlayer Gator Bowl
No. 19 Virginia Cavaliers (10–3) vs. Missouri Tigers (8–4) – Game summary

Quarter	1	2	3	4	Total
No. 19 Cavaliers	0	3	10	0	13
Tigers	7	0	0	0	7

at EverBank Stadium • Jacksonville, FL

- Date: December 27
- Game time: 7:30 p.m. EST
- Game weather: Sunny • Temperature: 68 °F (20 °C) • Wind: 5 mph (8.0 km/h) west
- Game attendance: 31,802
- Referee: Tuta Salaam
- TV announcers (ABC): Bob Wischusen (play-by-play), Louis Riddick (analyst), and Kris Budden (sideline)

Game information

First quarter

- MIZ – Jamal Roberts 5-yard run (Jayven Richardson kick), 11:56. Tigers 7–0. Drive: 7 plays, 74 yards, 3:00.

Second quarter

- UVA – Will Bettridge 42-yard field goal, 12:17. Tigers 7–3. Drive: 12 plays, 42 yards, 5:50.

Third quarter

- UVA – Harrison Waylee 2-yard run (Will Bettridge kick), 4:53. Cavaliers 10–7. Drive: 19 plays, 75 yards, 10:07.
- UVA – Will Bettridge 39-yard field goal, 1:00. Cavaliers 13–7. Drive: 7 plays, 14 yards, 3:03.

Fourth quarter

- No scoring plays.

Statistics	UVA	MIZ
First downs	18	13
Plays–yards	79–308	55–260
Rushes–yards	41–110	32–159
Passing yards	198	101
Passing: comp–att–int	25–38–0	12–23–1
Turnovers	1	1
Time of possession	38:34	21:26

Team	Category	Player	Statistics
Virginia	Passing	Chandler Morris	25/38, 198 yards
Virginia	Rushing	Harrison Waylee	20 carries, 68 yards, TD
Virginia	Receiving	Eli Wood IV	4 catches, 71 yards
Missouri	Passing	Matt Zollers	12/22, 101 yards, INT
Missouri	Rushing	Ahmad Hardy	15 carries, 89 yards
Missouri	Receiving	Donovan Olugbode	5 catches, 49 yards
