= Binuk Kodituwakku =

College Football Executive

- Born: Colombo, Sri Lanka
- Education: University of Western Australia; Duke University (MBA)
- Occupation: College football executive
- Employer: Duke University
- Known for: General Manager of Duke Blue Devils football

Binuk Kodituwakku is a Sri Lankan-born Australian sports executive who serves as the general manager of the Duke Blue Devils football program. He was promoted to the role in 2026 after previously serving as the program's chief football strategy officer.

== Early life and education ==
Kodituwakku was born in Colombo, Sri Lanka, and grew up in Perth, Australia. He graduated from the University of Western Australia with dual bachelor's degrees in law and commerce and later earned an MBA from Duke University's Fuqua School of Business.

== Career ==
=== Adelaide Football Club ===
Kodituwakku worked in player analytics for the Adelaide Football Club in the Australian Football League, later serving as head of analytics and football innovation. In this role he applied analytical models to list management decisions including drafting, trading, and contract negotiations, and worked to reduce bias in the club's recruiting process.

=== Duke ===
Kodituwakku joined Duke's football staff in June 2023 as director of football strategy, later titled chief football strategy officer, overseeing the program's Name, Image and Likeness (NIL) strategy, analytics, roster construction, and recruiting. His role in Duke's aggressive use of NIL to recruit transfer players, including quarterback Darian Mensah, drew national coverage; one agent described him as the program's "deal closer." His work was credited with helping build the roster that won the program's first outright Atlantic Coast Conference championship since 1962, and Duke recorded consecutive nine-win seasons.

As general manager, Kodituwakku has spoken publicly about Duke's approach to revenue sharing across its athletic programs, noting the program leverages the university's brand, alumni network, and marketability.

In 2026, head coach Manny Diaz announced Kodituwakku's promotion to general manager, succeeding John Garrett, who left for Florida State. ESPN reported that Kodituwakku had drawn interest from other power-conference programs but chose to remain at Duke.
