= 2025 ACC Championship Game =

Postseason college football bowl game

- Conference Championship
Duke Blue Devils	Virginia Cavaliers
(7–5)	(10–2)
27	20
Head coach: Manny Diaz	Head coach: Tony Elliott
	AP / Coaches / CFP; 16 / 16 / 17
	1	2	3	4	OT	Total
Duke	7	7	3	3	7	27
Virginia	0	7	3	10	0	20
- Date: December 6, 2025
- Season: 2025
- Stadium: Bank of America Stadium
- Location: Charlotte, North Carolina
- MVP: Darian Mensah, QB, Duke
- Favorite: Virginia by 3.5
- Referee: Jerry Magallanes
- Attendance: 41,672

United States TV coverage
- Network: ABC; ESPN Radio
- Announcers: ABC: Sean McDonough (play-by-play), Greg McElroy (analyst), Molly McGrath, and Taylor McGregor (sideline reporters); ESPN Radio: Marc Kestecher (play-by-play), Kelly Stouffer (analyst), and Ian Fitzsimmons (sideline reporter)

2025 Atlantic Coast Conference football standings
	Conf.			Overall
Team	W		L	W		L
No. 16 Virginia y	7	–	1	11	–	3
Duke y$	6	–	2	9	–	5
No. 2 Miami (FL) ^	6	–	2	13	–	3
Georgia Tech	6	–	2	9	–	4
SMU	6	–	2	9	–	4
Pittsburgh	6	–	2	8	–	5
Louisville	4	–	4	9	–	4
Wake Forest	4	–	4	9	–	4
NC State	4	–	4	8	–	5
California	4	–	4	7	–	6
Clemson	4	–	4	7	–	6
Stanford	3	–	5	4	–	8
Florida State	2	–	6	5	–	7
Virginia Tech	2	–	6	3	–	9
North Carolina	2	–	6	4	–	8
Boston College	1	–	7	2	–	10
Syracuse	1	–	7	3	–	9
Championship: Duke 27, Virginia 20^{OT}
^ – College Football Playoff participant; $ – Conference champion; y – Championship game participant; As of May 22, 2026; Rankings from AP Poll

The 2025 ACC Championship Game was a college football conference championship game played on December 6, 2025, to determine the champion of the Atlantic Coast Conference (ACC) for the 2025 season. The game featured the Virginia Cavaliers and the Duke Blue Devils. The 21st annual game began at 8:00 p.m. EST on ABC.

This was the first ACC Championship Game to go into overtime, with Duke winning it with an interception on a Virginia trick play. Duke went on to defeat Big XII opponent Arizona State in the 2025 Sun Bowl while Virginia went on to defeat SEC opponent Missouri in the 2025 Gator Bowl.

== Teams ==
The 2025 ACC Championship Game featured the Virginia Cavaliers, with a 7–1 conference record, as the #1 seed, and the Duke Blue Devils, with a 6–2 conference record, as the #2 seed, after winning a 5-way tiebreaker of 6–2 teams. During the last few weeks of the regular season, Duke's ability to clinch a spot in the conference championship caused a significant stir among commentators and fans. Duke had lost all three of their FBS nonconference games and had never been ranked during the season. This led many to speculate that Duke would not be one of the five highest-ranked conference champions at the end of the season, preventing them from receiving an automatic bid to the College Football Playoff. Miami, the highest-ranked ACC team, was outside of the top 10, leading many to call a Duke victory a "doomsday scenario" for the conference, where no teams might be invited to the playoff. Most considered James Madison, the favorite to win the Sun Belt Conference, but ranked below American favorites Tulane and North Texas, as the most likely beneficiary of a Duke victory, as they could become the fifth highest-ranked conference championship and make the playoffs instead.

This game was a rematch of a regular-season game on November 15; Virginia defeated Duke 34–17.

=== Duke Blue Devils ===
The Blue Devils clinched a spot in the game on November 29, when they defeated Wake Forest and then saw Pittsburgh lose to Miami and SMU lose to California. They finished the regular season 7–5 (6–2 ACC) and were the designated away team for this game.

This is Duke's first ACC Championship appearance since 2013, when they lost to eventual national champion Florida State 45–7. They sought their first ACC Championship since 1989 and first outright title since 1962.

=== Virginia Cavaliers ===
The Cavaliers clinched a spot in the game on November 29, when they defeated rival Virginia Tech. They finished the regular season 10–2 (7–1 ACC) and were the designated home team for this game.

This is their first ACC Championship appearance since 2019, when they lost to Clemson 62–17. They sought their first ACC Championship since 1995 and first outright championship in school history.

== Scoring summary ==
Duke led by a score of 14-7 at halftime, and put together the two longest drives in ACC Championship Game history, at 9:38 and 8:02 respectively. Duke expanded their lead to 20-10 with just 5:02 left, in the game, but Virginia responded with a field goal and a 96-yard touchdown drive to tie the game at 20, forcing overtime. However, Duke scored a touchdown in overtime, and Virginia was called for roughing the passer on the go-ahead score, forcing them to start at Duke’s 40-yard line. Chandler Morris attempted a chunk play to get back the yards they lost, but was intercepted, sealing the win for Duke.

2025 ACC Championship Game
Duke Blue Devils (7–5, 6–2) vs. No. 17 Virginia Cavaliers (10–2, 7–1)

Quarter	1	2	3	4	OT	Total
Duke	7	7	3	3	7	27
No. 17 Virginia	0	7	3	10	0	20

at Bank of America Stadium • Charlotte, NC

- Date: Saturday, December 6, 2025
- Game time: 8:00 p.m. EST
- Game weather: Cloudy • Temperature: 39 °F (4 °C) • Wind: W at 1 mile per hour (1.6 km/h)
- Game attendance: 41,672
- Referee: Jerry Magallanes
- TV announcers (ABC): Sean McDonough (play-by-play), Greg McElroy (color analyst), Molly McGrath, and Taylor McGregor (sideline reporters)

Game information

First quarter

- DUKE – Jeremiah Halsey 12-yard pass from Darian Mensah (Todd Pelino kick), 10:40. Blue Devils 7–0. Drive: 15 plays, 75 yards, 9:38.

Second quarter

- UVA – J'Mari Taylor 11-yard pass from Chandler Morris (Will Bettridge kick), 14:16. Tied 7–7. Drive: 3 plays, 23 yards, 1:31.
- DUKE – Nate Sheppard 16-yard run (Todd Pelino kick), 6:14. Blue Devils 14–7. Drive: 13 plays, 75 yards, 8:02.

Third quarter

- UVA – Will Bettridge 24-yard field goal, 7:19. Blue Devils 14–10. Drive: 17 plays, 68 yards, 7:41.
- DUKE – Todd Pelino 29-yard field goal, 3:53. Blue Devils 17–10. Drive: 6 plays, 63 yards, 3:26.

Fourth quarter

- DUKE – Todd Pelino 23-yard field goal, 5:02. Blue Devils 20–10. Drive: 5 plays, 28 yards, 2:19.
- UVA – Will Bettridge 42-yard field goal, 3:54. Blue Devils 20–13. Drive: 8 plays, 50 yards, 1:08.
- UVA – Eli Wood 18-yard pass from Chandler Morris (Will Bettridge kick), 0:22. Tied 20–20. Drive: 10 plays, 96 yards, 1:22.

Overtime

- DUKE – Jeremiah Hasley 1-yard pass from Darian Mensah (Todd Pelino kick). Blue Devils 27–20. Drive: 7 plays, 25 yards.

Statistics	DUKE	UVA
First downs	19	25
Plays–yards	69–333	69–344
Rushes–yards	44–137	29–128
Passing yards	196	216
Passing: comp–att–int	19–25–1	21–40–2
Time of possession	34:24	25:36

Team	Category	Player	Statistics
Duke	Passing	Darian Mensah	19–25, 196 yards, 2 TD, INT
Duke	Rushing	Nate Sheppard	21 carries, 97 yards, TD
Duke	Receiving	Cooper Barkate	5 receptions, 91 yards
Virginia	Passing	Chandler Morris	21–40, 216 yards, 2 TD, 2 INT
Virginia	Rushing	Harrison Waylee	11 carries, 66 yards
Virginia	Receiving	Cam Ross	5 receptions, 59 yards
