= Cooper Barkate =

American football player (born 2003)

No. 18 – Miami Hurricanes
- Position: Wide receiver
- Class: Redshirt Senior

Personal information
- Born: January 12, 2003 (age 23); Newport Beach, California, U.S.
- Listed height: 6 ft 1 in (1.85 m)
- Listed weight: 195 lb (88 kg)

Career information
- High school: Mater Dei (Santa Ana, California)
- College: Harvard (2022–2024); Duke (2025); Miami (FL) (2026–present)

Awards and highlights
- First-team All-Ivy League (2024); Second-team All-ACC (2025)
- Stats at ESPN

Cooper Barkate (born January 12, 2003) is an American college football wide receiver for the Miami Hurricanes. He previously played for the Harvard Crimson and the Duke Blue Devils.

== Early life ==
Barkate attended St. Margaret's Episcopal School in San Juan Capistrano, California and Mission Viejo High School in Mission Viejo, California before transferring to Mater Dei High School in Santa Ana, California for his senior year. He played wide receiver and cornerback in high school. He committed to Harvard University to play college football.

== College career ==
=== Harvard ===
Barkate played three years at Harvard from 2022 to 2024. With Harvard, he started 19 of 23 games and had 113 receptions for 1,742 yards and 14 touchdowns. On November 25, 2024, Barkate entered the NCAA transfer portal.

=== Duke ===
On December 28, 2024, Barkate committed to the Duke Blue Devils. He made his Blue Devils debut in the 2025 season opener against Elon, recording five receptions for 117 yards in a victory. In Week 4 against North Carolina, he caught his first touchdown at Duke on a 37-yard reception from quarterback Darian Mensah in a win. The following week against Syracuse, Barkate recorded his first multi-touchdown performance of the season, finishing with four receptions for 72 yards in a 38–3 victory. In Week 7 against No. 12 Georgia Tech, he recorded a season-high 13 receptions for 172 yards in a loss. The following week against Clemson, he had six receptions for 127 yards and a touchdown in a 46–45 win. In the 2025 ACC Championship Game against No. 17 Virginia, Barkate had five receptions for 91 yards in a 27–20 overtime victory. In the 2025 Sun Bowl, he recorded four receptions for 37 yards and a touchdown in a 42–39 victory over Arizona State. He appeared in and started all 14 games during the season, recording 72 receptions for 1,106 yards and seven touchdowns. For his performance, he was named second-team All-ACC. On January 21, 2026, Barkate entered the transfer portal.

=== Miami ===
On January 27, 2026, Barkate committed to the Miami Hurricanes, where he reunited with former Duke teammate Darian Mensah.

=== Statistics ===
| Year | Team | Games | | Receiving | | | |
| Year | Team | GP | GS | Rec | Yds | Avg | TD |
|---|---|---|---|---|---|---|---|
| 2022 | Harvard | 4 | 0 | 10 | 157 | 15.7 | 0 |
| 2023 | Harvard | 9 | 9 | 40 | 501 | 12.5 | 3 |
| 2024 | Harvard | 10 | 10 | 63 | 1,084 | 17.2 | 11 |
| FCS career | | 23 | 19 | 113 | 1,742 | 15.4 | 14 |
| 2025 | Duke | 14 | 14 | 72 | 1,106 | 15.4 | 7 |
| 2026 | Miami | 4 | 4 | 14 | 143 | 10.2 | 3 |
| FBS career | | 18 | 18 | 86 | 1,249 | 15.2 | 10 |
| Career total | | 43 | 39 | 199 | 2,991 | 15.0 | 24 |
