= 2025 Duke Blue Devils football team =

American college football season

2025 Duke Blue Devils football

ACC champion Sun Bowl champion

ACC Championship Game, W 27–20 ^{OT} vs. Virginia

Sun Bowl, W 42–39 vs. Arizona State
- Conference: Atlantic Coast Conference
- Record: 9–5 (6–2 ACC)
- Head coach: Manny Diaz (2nd season)
- Offensive coordinator: Jonathan Brewer (2nd season)
- Offensive scheme: Spread
- Defensive coordinator: Jonathan Patke (2nd season)
- Base defense: Multiple
- Captains: Aaron Hall; Darian Mensah; Justin Pickett; Wesley Williams
- Home stadium: Wallace Wade Stadium

2025 Atlantic Coast Conference football standings
	Conf.			Overall
Team	W		L	W		L
No. 16 Virginia y	7	–	1	11	–	3
Duke y$	6	–	2	9	–	5
No. 2 Miami (FL) ^	6	–	2	13	–	3
Georgia Tech	6	–	2	9	–	4
SMU	6	–	2	9	–	4
Pittsburgh	6	–	2	8	–	5
Louisville	4	–	4	9	–	4
Wake Forest	4	–	4	9	–	4
NC State	4	–	4	8	–	5
California	4	–	4	7	–	6
Clemson	4	–	4	7	–	6
Stanford	3	–	5	4	–	8
Florida State	2	–	6	5	–	7
Virginia Tech	2	–	6	3	–	9
North Carolina	2	–	6	4	–	8
Boston College	1	–	7	2	–	10
Syracuse	1	–	7	3	–	9
Championship: Duke 27, Virginia 20^{OT}
^ – College Football Playoff participant; $ – Conference champion; y – Championship game participant; As of October 8, 2026; Rankings from AP Poll

The 2025 Duke Blue Devils football team represented Duke University during the 2025 NCAA Division I FBS football season as a member of the Atlantic Coast Conference (ACC). The Blue Devils were led by head coach Manny Diaz, coaching his second year as the Blue Devils head coach, and played their home games at Wallace Wade Stadium located in Durham, North Carolina.

Despite finishing the regular season with a 7–5 record, Duke finished first in a five-way tie for second place in the ACC with a 6–2 conference record. This included a 3–0 record against their Tobacco Road rivals, thus winning the North Carolina state championship and The Battle for the Old State Trophy for the second year in a row. Their season earned them a spot in the ACC championship game, where they upset the Virginia Cavaliers in overtime and won their first ACC title since 1989 and their first outright ACC title since 1962. Furthermore, this was Duke's first victory in the ACC championship game since the game's inception. They then participated in the Sun Bowl, where they beat the Arizona State Sun Devils in a high-scoring shootout to finish 9–5 on the season.

== Transfers ==
Outgoing

Name	Pos.	Height	Weight	Hometown	New School
Maalik Murphy	QB	6'5"	232 lbs	Inglewood, CA	Oregon State
Grayson Loftis	QB	6'2"	205 lbs	Gaffney, SC	Charlotte
Carter Wyatt	LB	6'1"	233 lbs	Wilmington, NC	Elon
Casey Donahue	LS	6'4"	210 lbs	Durham, NC	TBA
Montreze Smith	LB	5'11"	195 lbs	Carrollton, GA	Western Kentucky
Star Thomas	RB	6'0''	210 lbs	Homer, LA	Tennessee
Rent Montie	QB	6'3''	210 lbs	Palm Harbor, FL	TBA
Placide Djungu-Sungu	S	6'1''	195 lbs	Arlington, TX	Baylor
Marquise Collins	RB	5'9"	210 lbs	College Station, TX	UAB
Zachary Franks	IOL	6'6"	310 lbs	Baltimore, MD	UMass
James Pogorelc	OT	6'8"	300 lbs	Chantilly, VA	James Madison
Al Wooten II	RB	6'0"	225 lbs	Memphis, TN	Towson
Spencer Jones	WR	6'4"	205 lbs	Olney, MD	Campbell
Quran Boyd	RB	5'10"	190 lbs	Virginia Beach, VA	TBA
Ryan Leavy	P	6'0"	170 lbs	Tampa, FL	East Carolina

Incoming

Name	Pos.	Height	Weight	Hometown	Previous School
Darian Mensah	QB	6'3"	215 lbs	New Orleans, LA	Tulane
Anderson Castle	RB	6'0''	220 lbs	Boone, NC	Appalachian State
Jaiden Francois	CB	5'10''	195 lbs	Homestead, FL	Utah State
Cooper Barkate	WR	6'1"	195 lbs	Santa Ana, CA	Harvard
Andrel Anthony	WR	6'2"	185 lbs	East Lansing, MI	Oklahoma
Josiah Green	DL	6'1"	280 lbs	Indianapolis, IN	Dartmouth
Caleb Weaver	S	5'9"	170 lbs	Charlotte, NC	Sam Houston State
Landen King	TE	6'5"	232 lbs	Humble, TX	Utah
Jordan Larsen	IOL	6'3"	310 lbs	Harrisburg, SD	South Dakota

== Schedule ==
Date	Time	Opponent	Site	TV	Result	Attendance
August 28	7:30 p.m.	Elon*	Wallace Wade Stadium; Durham, NC	ACCNX/ESPN+	W 45–17	15,677
September 6	12:00 p.m.	No. 11 Illinois*	Wallace Wade Stadium; Durham, NC	ESPN	L 19–45	23,893
September 13	8:00 p.m.	at Tulane*	Yulman Stadium; New Orleans, LA	ESPN2	L 27–34	30,000
September 20	4:00 p.m.	NC State	Wallace Wade Stadium; Durham, NC (rivalry)	ESPN2	W 45–33	30,022
September 27	12:00 p.m.	at Syracuse	JMA Wireless Dome; Syracuse, NY	ACCN	W 38–3	44,451
October 4	10:30 p.m.	at California	California Memorial Stadium; Berkeley, CA	ESPN	W 45–21	42,240
October 18	12:00 p.m.	No. 12 Georgia Tech	Wallace Wade Stadium; Durham, NC	ESPN	L 18–27	27,846
November 1	12:00 p.m.	at Clemson	Memorial Stadium; Clemson, SC	ACCN	W 46–45	75,809
November 8	3:30 p.m.	at UConn*	Pratt & Whitney Stadium at Rentschler Field; East Hartford, CT	CBSSN	L 34–37	38,106
November 15	3:30 p.m.	No. 19 Virginia	Wallace Wade Stadium; Durham, NC	ESPN2	L 17–34	27,215
November 22	3:30 p.m.	at North Carolina	Kenan Stadium; Chapel Hill, NC (Victory Bell)	ACCN	W 32–25	50,500
November 29	3:30 p.m.	Wake Forest	Wallace Wade Stadium; Durham, NC (rivalry)	ACCN	W 49–32	21,045
December 6	8:00 p.m.	vs. No. 17 Virginia	Bank of America Stadium; Charlotte, NC (ACC Championship Game)	ABC	W 27–20 ^{OT}	41,672
December 31	4:00 p.m.	vs. Arizona State*	Sun Bowl; El Paso, TX (Sun Bowl)	CBS	W 42–39	44,975
*Non-conference game; Rankings from AP Poll (and CFP Rankings, after November 4) - Released prior to game; All times are in Eastern time; Source:

== Rankings ==
Ranking movements Legend: ██ Increase in ranking ██ Decrease in ranking — = Not ranked RV = Received votes
	Week																
Poll	Pre	1	2	3	4	5	6	7	8	9	10	11	12	13	14	15	Final
AP	RV	RV	—	—	—	—	—	—	—	—	—	—	—	—	—	RV	RV
Coaches	RV	RV	RV	—	—	RV	RV	RV	—	—	—	—	—	—	—	RV	RV
CFP	Not released										—	—	—	—	—	—	Not released

== Roster ==
2025 Duke Blue Devils football team roster
Players
Coaches
Offense

Pos.	#	Name	Class
WR	1	Andrel Anthony	GS
WR	7	Que'Sean Brown	So
QB	10	Darian Mensah	So
WR	18	Cooper Barkate	GS
RB	20	Nate Sheppard	Fr
OL	53	Brian Parker II	Jr
TE	85	Jeremiah Hasley	Jr

Defense

Pos.	#	Name	Class
CB	0	Chandler Rivers	Sr
S	1	Terry Moore	GS
DE	7	Vincent Anthony Jr.	Sr
LB	38	Memorable Factor	GS
LB	97	Wesley Williams	Jr
DT	99	Aaron Hall	GS

Special teams

Pos.	#	Name	Class

Head coach

- Manny Diaz

Coordinators/assistant coaches

Legend

- (C) Team captain
- (S) Suspended
- (I) Ineligible
- Injured
- Redshirt

Roster

== Game summaries ==
=== Elon (FCS) ===
Elon Phoenix (FCS) (0–0) at Duke Blue Devils (0–0) – Game summary

Quarter	1	2	3	4	Total
Phoenix (FCS)	0	10	0	7	17
Blue Devils	3	7	14	21	45

at Wallace Wade Stadium • Durham, North Carolina

- Date: August 28
- Game time: 7:30 p.m. EDT
- Game weather:
- Game attendance: 15,677
- Referee:
- TV announcers (ACCNX/ESPN+): Matt Schick (play-by-play), Forrest Conoly (analyst), and Michella Chester (sideline)

Game information

First quarter

- DUKE – Todd Pelino 41-yard field goal, 1:31. Blue Devils 3–0. Drive: 13 plays, 72 yards, 4:32.

Second quarter

- ELON – Luke Barnes 35-yard field goal, 9:50. Tied 3–3. Drive: 13 plays, 58 yards, 6:41.
- DUKE – Jaquez Moore 32-yard run (Todd Pelino kick), 8:01. Blue Devils 10–3. Drive: 4 plays, 75 yards, 1:49.
- ELON – Landen Clark 2-yard run (Luke Barnes kick), 3:43. Tied 10–10. Drive: 9 plays, 75 yards, 4:18.

Third quarter

- DUKE – Sahmir Hagans 15-yard pass from Darian Mensah (Todd Pelino kick), 10:59. Blue Devils 17–10. Drive: 8 plays, 83 yards, 3:57.
- DUKE – Andrel Anthony 27-yard pass from Darian Mensah (Todd Pelino kick), 5:46. Blue Devils 24–10. Drive: 8 plays, 88 yards, 3:36.

Fourth quarter

- ELON – Landyn Backey 3-yard run (Luke Barnes kick), 14:12. Blue Devils 24–17. Drive: 12 plays, 75 yards, 6:34.
- DUKE – Sahmir Hagans 6-yard pass from Darian Mensah (Todd Pelino kick), 11:28. Blue Devils 31–17. Drive: 5 plays, 80 yards, 2:39.
- DUKE – Que'Sean Brown 78-yard punt return (Todd Pelino kick), 9:18. Blue Devils 38–17.
- DUKE – Peyton Jones 5-yard run (Todd Pelino kick), 1:55. Blue Devils 45–17. Drive: 7 plays, 47 yards, 5:00.

Statistics	ELON	DUKE
First downs	14	23
Plays–yards	62–275	59–548
Rushes–yards	44–163	25–159
Passing yards	112	389
Passing: comp–att–int	11/18/0	27/34/0
Turnovers	0	1
Time of possession	32:53	27:07

Team	Category	Player	Statistics
Elon	Passing	Landen Clark	10/16, 101 yards
Elon	Rushing	Landen Clark	18 carries, 61 yards, 1 TD
Elon	Receiving	Dylan Magazu	3 receptions, 61 yards
Duke	Passing	Darian Mensah	27/34, 389 yards, 3 TD
Duke	Rushing	Anderson Castle	3 carries, 69 yards
Duke	Receiving	Cooper Barkate	5 receptions, 117 yards

=== No. 11 Illinois ===
No. 11 Illinois Fighting Illini (1–0) at Duke Blue Devils (1–0) – Game summary

Quarter	1	2	3	4	Total
No. 11 Fighting Illini	7	7	14	17	45
Blue Devils	3	10	6	0	19

at Wallace Wade Stadium • Durham, North Carolina

- Date: September 6
- Game time: 11:00 a.m. EDT
- Game weather:
- Game attendance: 23,893
- Referee: Ron Snodgrass
- TV announcers (ESPN): Dave Pasch (play-by-play), Dusty Dvoracek (analyst), and Taylor McGregor (sideline)

Game information

First quarter

- DUKE – Todd Pelino 40-yard field goal, 10:26. Blue Devils 3–0. Drive: 9 plays, 52 yards, 4:34.
- ILL – Kaden Feagin 1-yard run (David Olano kick), 1:51. Fighting Illini 7–3. Drive: 5 plays, 18 yards, 2:14.

Second quarter

- DUKE – Todd Pelino 40-yard field goal, 11:08. Fighting Illini 7–6. Drive: 14 plays, 52 yards, 5:43.
- ILL – Cole Rusk 8-yard pass from Luke Altmyer (David Olano kick), 5:01. Fighting Illini 14–6. Drive: 12 plays, 75 yards, 6:07.
- DUKE – Andrel Anthony 5-yard pass from Darian Mensah (Todd Pelino kick), 0:08. Fighting Illini 14–13. Drive: 9 plays, 77 yards, 1:03.

Third quarter

- ILL – Justin Bowick 4-yard pass from Luke Altmyer (David Olano kick), 9:34. Fighting Illini 21–13. Drive: 11 plays, 75 yards, 5:26.
- ILL – Hank Beatty 25-yard run (David Olano kick), 6:54. Fighting Illini 28–13. Drive: 4 plays, 61 yards, 1:06.
- DUKE – Andrel Anthony 6-yard pass from Darian Mensah (pass failed), 4:00. Fighting Illini 28–19. Drive: 7 plays, 75 yards, 2:54.

Fourth quarter

- ILL – David Olano 35-yard field goal, 14:04. Fighting Illini 31–19. Drive: 9 plays, 57 yards, 4:56.
- ILL – Collin Dixon 2-yard pass from Luke Altmyer (David Olano kick), 4:14. Fighting Illini 38–19. Drive: 12 plays, 89 yards, 6:45.
- ILL – Ca'Lil Valentine 23-yard run (David Olano kick), 3:58. Fighting Illini 45–19. Drive: 1 play, 23 yards, 0:06.

Statistics	ILL	DUKE
First downs	25	21
Plays–yards	73–419	63–438
Rushes–yards	42–123	24–82
Passing yards	296	356
Passing: comp–att–int	22–31–0	25–39–1
Turnovers	0	5
Time of possession	36:12	23:48

Team	Category	Player	Statistics
Illinois	Passing	Luke Altmyer	22/31, 296 yards, 3 TD
Illinois	Rushing	Kaden Feagin	17 carries, 48 yards, TD
Illinois	Receiving	Hank Beatty	8 receptions, 128 yards
Duke	Passing	Darian Mensah	23/24, 234 yards, 2 TD, INT
Duke	Rushing	Jaquez Moore	6 carries, 30 yards
Duke	Receiving	Cooper Barkate	4 receptions, 88 yards

=== at Tulane ===
Duke Blue Devils (1–1) at Tulane Green Wave (2–0) – Game summary

Quarter	1	2	3	4	Total
Blue Devils	0	9	7	11	27
Green Wave	14	10	7	3	34

at Yulman Stadium • New Orleans, Louisiana

- Date: September 13
- Game time: 8:00 p.m. EDT / 7:00 p.m. CDT
- Game weather: Cloudy • Temperature: 89 °F (32 °C) • Wind: SE at 9 miles per hour (14 km/h)
- Game attendance: 30,000
- Referee: Riley Johnson
- TV announcers (ESPN2): Lowell Galindo (play-by-play), Aaron Murray (analyst), and Lauren Sisler (sideline)

Game information

First quarter

- (10:50) TULN – Jake Retzlaff 19-yard run, Patrick Durkin kick (Drive: 6 plays, 64 yards, 3:14; Tulane 7–0)
- (2:56) TULN – Jake Retzlaff 6-yard run, Patrick Durkin kick (Drive: 10 plays, 74 yards, 5:39; Tulane 14–0)

Second quarter

- (15:00) DUKE – Todd Pelino 28-yard field goal (Drive: 9 plays, 64 yards, 2:56; Tulane 14–3)
- (6:00) TULN – Jake Retzlaff 20-yard run, Patrick Durkin kick (Drive: 6 plays, 61 yards, 3:14; Tulane 21–3)
- (1:54) TULN – Patrick Durkin 29-yard field goal (Drive: 5 plays, 25 yards, 1:34; Tulane 24–3)
- (0:18) DUKE – Sahmir Hagans 29-yard pass from Darian Mensah, pass failed (Drive: 8 plays, 75 yards, 1:36; Tulane 24–9)

Third quarter

- (11:46) DUKE – Landen King 3-yard pass from Darian Mensah, Todd Pelino kick (Drive: 5 plays, 42 yards, 2:09; Tulane 24–16)
- (6:31) TULN – Jake Retzlaff 11-yard run, Patrick Durkin kick (Drive: 11 plays, 75 yards, 5:15; Tulane 31–16)

Fourth quarter

- (14:12) TULN – Patrick Durkin 27-yard field goal (Drive: 8 plays, 67 yards, 4:52; Tulane 34–16)
- (2:57) DUKE – Nate Sheppard 4-yard pass from Darian Mensah, Nate Sheppard run (Drive: 14 plays, 68 yards, 4:34; Tulane 34–24)
- (1:06) DUKE – Todd Pelino 47-yard field goal (Drive: 8 plays, 56 yards, 1:22; Tulane 34–27)

Statistics	DUKE	TUL
First downs	27	22
Plays–yards	75–452	63–426
Rushes–yards	24–139	38–156
Passing yards	313	270
Passing: comp–att–int	30–51–1	17–25–0
Turnovers	1	1
Time of possession	26:43	33:17

Team	Category	Player	Statistics
Duke	Passing	Darian Mensah	30/51, 313 yards, 3 TD, INT
Duke	Rushing	Nate Sheppard	5 carries, 75 yards
Duke	Receiving	Que'Sean Brown	6 receptions, 81 yards
Tulane	Passing	Jake Retzlaff	15/23, 245 yards
Tulane	Rushing	Jake Retzlaff	17 carries, 111 yards, 4 TD
Tulane	Receiving	Shazz Preston	3 receptions, 95 yards

=== NC State (Tobacco Road) ===
NC State Wolfpack (3–0) at Duke Blue Devils (1–2) – Game summary

Quarter	1	2	3	4	Total
Wolfpack	7	13	6	7	33
Blue Devils	7	14	14	10	45

at Wallace Wade Stadium • Durham, North Carolina

- Date: September 20
- Game time: 4:00 p.m. EDT
- Game weather: Scattered clouds, 88 °F (31 °C), E 7 mph
- Game attendance: 30,022
- Referee: Justin Elliott
- TV announcers (ESPN2): Mike Monaco (play-by-play), Kirk Morrison (analyst), and Dawn Davenport (sideline)

Game information

First quarter

- NCSU – Terrell Anderson 75-yard pass from CJ Bailey (Kanoah Vinesett kick), 14:10. Wolfpack 7–0. Drive: 3 plays, 74 yards, 0:45.
- DUKE – Anderson Castle 2-yard run (Todd Pelino kick), 10:49. Tied 7–7. Drive: 10 plays, 70 yards, 3:16.

Second quarter

- NCSU – Terrell Anderson 6-yard pass from CJ Bailey (Kanoah Vinesett kick), 14:18. Wolfpack 14–7. Drive: 16 plays, 99 yards, 9:13.
- NCSU – Will Wilson 1-yard run (Kanoah Vinesett kick failed), 5:45. Wolfpack 20–7. Drive: 10 plays, 80 yards, 4:54.
- DUKE – Landen King 17-yard pass from Darian Mensah (Todd Pelino kick), 2:20. Wolfpack 20–14. Drive: 10 plays, 72 yards, 3:20.
- DUKE – Anderson Castle 1-yard run (Todd Pelino kick), 0:16. Blue Devils 21–20. Drive: 2 plays, 12 yards, 0:29.

Third quarter

- DUKE – Sahmir Hagans 33-yard pass from Darian Mensah (Todd Pelino kick), 13:30. Blue Devils 28–20. Drive: 4 plays, 75 yards, 1:30.
- NCSU – Hollywood Smothers 51-yard run (run failed), 11:53. Blue Devils 28–26. Drive: 4 plays, 75 yards, 1:37.
- DUKE – Cooper Barkate 37-yard pass from Darian Mensah (Todd Pelino kick), 8:32. Blue Devils 35–26. Drive: 8 plays, 75 yards, 3:21.

Fourth quarter

- DUKE – Todd Pelino 43-yard field goal, 14:18. Blue Devils 38–26. Drive: 8 plays, 37 yards, 2:59.
- NCSU – Will Wilson 1-yard run (Kanoah Vinesett kick), 4:01. Blue Devils 38–33. Drive: 15 plays, 95 yards, 7:26.
- DUKE – Anderson Castle 66-yard run (Todd Pelino kick), 2:19. Blue Devils 45–33. Drive: 3 plays, 75 yards, 1:42.

Statistics	NCSU	DUKE
First downs	26	22
Plays–yards	73–537	62–419
Rushes–yards	34–173	34–150
Passing yards	364	269
Passing: comp–att–int	29–39–3	19–28–0
Turnovers	4	0
Time of possession	32:29	27:31

Team	Category	Player	Statistics
NC State	Passing	CJ Bailey	29/39, 364 yards, 2 TD, 3 INT
NC State	Rushing	Hollywood Smothers	17 carries, 123 yards, TD
NC State	Receiving	Terrell Anderson	6 receptions, 166 yards, 2 TD
Duke	Passing	Darian Mensah	19/28, 269 yards, 3 TD
Duke	Rushing	Anderson Castle	12 carries, 92 yards, 3 TD
Duke	Receiving	Cooper Barkate	3 reception, 65 yards, TD

=== at Syracuse ===
Duke Blue Devils (2–2) at Syracuse Orange (3–1) – Game summary

Quarter	1	2	3	4	Total
Blue Devils	10	14	7	7	38
Orange	3	0	0	0	3

at JMA Wireless Dome • Syracuse, New York

- Date: September 27
- Game time: 12:00 p.m. EDT
- Game weather: None (played indoors)
- Game attendance: 44,451
- Referee: Adam Savoie
- TV announcers (ACCN): Wes Durham (play-by-play), Steve Addazio (analyst), and Dana Boyle (sideline)

Game information

First quarter

- (9:42) DUKE – Todd Pelino 22-yard field goal (Drive: 7 plays, 40 yards, 3:50; Duke 3-0)
- (4:10) SYR – Tripp Woody 29-yard field goal (Drive: 11 plays, 64 yards, 5:32; 3-3)
- (3:12) DUKE – Nate Sheppard 49-yard run, Todd Pelino kick (Drive: 4 plays, 75 yards, 0:58; Duke 10-3)

Second quarter

- (12:01) DUKE – Cooper Barkate 34-yard pass from Darian Mensah, Todd Pelino kick (Drive: 3 plays, 61 yards, 0:48; Duke 17-3)
- (1:55) DUKE – Cooper Barkate 12-yard pass from Darian Mensah, Todd Pelino kick (Drive: 12 plays, 68 yards, 5:24; Duke 24-3)

Third quarter

- (5:34) DUKE – Nate Sheppard 12-yard run, Todd Pelino kick (Drive: 7 plays, 60 yards, 3:14; Duke 31-3)

Fourth quarter

- (11:04) DUKE – Anderson Castle 13-yard run, Todd Pelino kick (Drive: 9 plays, 71 yards, 5:33; Duke 38-3)

Statistics	DUKE	SYR
First downs	23	19
Plays–yards	59-503	51-314
Rushes–yards	37-235	27-85
Passing yards	268	229
Passing: comp–att–int	22-28-0	24-37-1
Turnovers	0	3
Time of possession	31:15	28:45

Team	Category	Player	Statistics
Duke	Passing	Darian Mensah	22/28, 268 yards, 2 TD
Duke	Rushing	Nate Sheppard	15 carries, 168 yards, 2 TD
Duke	Receiving	Cooper Barkate	4 receptions, 72 yards, 2 TD
Syracuse	Passing	Rickie Collins	24/37, 229 yards, INT
Syracuse	Rushing	Yasin Willis	11 carries, 63 yards
Syracuse	Receiving	Johntay Cook	6 receptions, 74 yards

=== at California ===
Duke Blue Devils (3–2) at California Golden Bears (4–1) – Game summary

Quarter	1	2	3	4	Total
Blue Devils	7	24	0	14	45
Golden Bears	14	7	0	0	21

at California Memorial Stadium • Berkeley, California

- Date: October 4
- Game time: 10:30 p.m. EDT / 7:30 p.m. PDT
- Game weather: Temperature: 62 °F (17 °C) • Wind: SW at 4 miles per hour (6.4 km/h) • Weather: Clear
- Game attendance: 42,240
- Referee: Darryl Berry
- TV announcers (ESPN): Dave Flemming (play-by-play), Brock Osweiler (analyst), and Stormy Buonantony (sideline)

Game information

First quarter

- (9:11) CAL - Jordan King 6-yard pass from Jaron-Keawe Sagapolutele, Chase Meyer kick (Drive: 11 plays, 75 yards, 5:49; California 7–0)
- (5:20) CAL - Kendrick Raphael 5-yard run, Chase Meyer kick (Drive: 5 plays, 55 yards, 2:07; California 14–0)
- (2:38) DUKE - Nate Sheppard 12-yard run, Todd Pelino kick (Drive: 8 plays, 77 yards, 2:37; California 14–7)

Second quarter

- (12:17) CAL - Kendrick Raphael 4-yard run, Chase Meyer kick (Drive: 11 plays, 80 yards, 05:17; California 21–7)
- (7:47) DUKE - Anderson Castle 2-yard run, Todd Pelino kick (Drive: 10 plays, 58 yards, 4:20; California 21–14)
- (5:50) DUKE - Que'Sean Brown 26-yard pass from Darian Mensah, Todd Pelino kick (Drive: 3 plays, 62 yards, 1:09; Tied 21–21)
- (1:10) DUKE - Anderson Castle 1-yard run, Todd Pelino kick (Drive: 6 plays, 38 yards, 2:29; Duke 28–21)
- (0:00) DUKE - Todd Pelino 25-yard field goal (Drive: 6 plays, 53 yards, 0:47; Duke 31–21)

Third quarter

- No scoring plays.

Fourth quarter

- (8:22) DUKE - Cooper Barkate 10-yard pass from Darian Mensah, Todd Pelino kick (Drive: 6 plays, 55 yards, 3:59; Duke 38–21)
- (5:50) DUKE - Nate Sheppard 46-yard run, Todd Pelino kick (Drive: 2 plays, 51 yards, 0:55; Duke 45–21)

Statistics	DUKE	CAL
First downs	24	20
Plays–yards	445	286
Rushes–yards	36-180	29-41
Passing yards	265	245
Passing: comp–att–int	22-30-0	20-32-4
Turnovers	0	4
Time of possession	31:03	28:57

Team	Category	Player	Statistics
Duke	Passing	Darian Mensah	22/30, 265 yards, 2 TD
Duke	Rushing	Nate Sheppard	12 carries, 91 yards, 2 TD
Duke	Receiving	Que'Sean Brown	7 receptions, 108 yards, TD
California	Passing	Jaron-Keawe Sagapolutele	20/31, 245 yards, TD, 3 INT
California	Rushing	Kendrick Raphael	18 carries, 67 yards, 2 TD
California	Receiving	Mason Mini	3 receptions, 56 yards

=== No. 12 Georgia Tech ===
No. 12 Georgia Tech Yellow Jackets (6–0) at Duke Blue Devils (4–2) – Game summary

Quarter	1	2	3	4	Total
No. 12 Yellow Jackets	7	0	3	17	27
Blue Devils	0	7	3	8	18

at Wallace Wade Stadium • Durham, North Carolina

- Date: October 18
- Game time: 12:00 p.m. EDT
- Game weather: Sunny
- Game attendance: 27,846
- Referee: Justin Elliott
- TV announcers (ESPN): Bob Wischusen (play-by-play), Louis Riddick (analyst), and Kris Budden (sideline)
- Box score

Game information

First quarter

- GT – Omar Daniels 95-yard fumble return (Aidan Birr kick), 3:46. Yellow Jackets 7–0.

Second quarter

- DUKE – Landen King 20-yard pass from Darian Mensah (Todd Pelino kick), 0:27. Tied 7–7. Drive: 11 plays, 80 yards, 3:59.

Third quarter

- DUKE – Todd Pelino 23-yard field goal, 6:10. Blue Devils 10–7. Drive: 15 plays, 50 yards, 8:43.
- GT – Aidan Birr 40-yard field goal, 2:45. Tied 10–10. Drive: 8 plays, 63 yards, 3:21.

Fourth quarter

- GT – Aidan Birr 23-yard field goal, 11:01. Yellow Jackets 13–10. Drive: 12 plays, 89 yards, 4:35.
- GT – Malachi Hosley 10-yard run (Aidan Birr kick), 4:57. Yellow Jackets 20–10. Drive: 9 plays, 72 yards, 5:01.
- GT – Haynes King 28-yard run (Aidan Birr kick), 2:10. Yellow Jackets 27–10. Drive: 4 plays, 71 yards, 0:42.
- DUKE – Sahmir Hagans 19-yard pass from Darian Mensah (Darian Mensah–Cooper Barkate pass), 1:13. Yellow Jackets 27–18. Drive: 7 plays, 75 yards, 0:57.

Statistics	GT	DUKE
First downs	21	26
Plays–yards	57-376	76-441
Rushes–yards	36-171	32-68
Passing yards	205	373
Passing: comp–att–int	14-21-0	32-44-0
Turnovers	0	1
Time of possession	26:31	33:29

Team	Category	Player	Statistics
Georgia Tech	Passing	Haynes King	14/21, 205 yards
Georgia Tech	Rushing	Haynes King	14 carries, 120 yards, TD
Georgia Tech	Receiving	Isiah Canion	3 receptions, 56 yards
Duke	Passing	Darian Mensah	32/44, 373 yards, 2 TD
Duke	Rushing	Nate Sheppard	15 carries, 50 yards
Duke	Receiving	Cooper Barkate	13 receptions, 172 yards

=== at Clemson ===
Duke Blue Devils (4–3) at Clemson Tigers (3–4) – Game summary

Quarter	1	2	3	4	Total
Blue Devils	21	7	7	11	46
Tigers	7	21	10	7	45

at Memorial Stadium • Clemson, South Carolina

- Date: November 1
- Game time: 12:00 p.m. EDT
- Game weather: Temperature: 56 °F (13 °C) • Wind: SW @ 1 mph • Weather: Sunny
- Game attendance: 75,809
- Referee: Tim Hedgepeth
- TV announcers (ACCN): Wes Durham (play-by-play), Steve Addazio (analyst), and Dana Boyle (sideline)

Game information

First quarter

- (10:08) DUKE – Que'Sean Brown 19-yard pass from Darian Mensah, Todd Pelino kick (Drive: 9 plays, 53 yards, 2:05; DUKE 7–0)
- (06:25) CLEM – Antonio Williams 5-yard run, Nolan Hauser kick (Drive: 6 plays, 75 yards, 3:43; Tied 7–7)
- (05:33) DUKE – Cooper Barkate 77-yard pass from Darian Mensah, Todd Pelino kick (Drive: 2 plays, 79 yards, 0:34; DUKE 14–7)
- (10:08) DUKE – Andrel Anthony 20-yard pass from Darian Mensah, Todd Pelino kick (Drive: 10 plays, 72 yards, 4:24; DUKE 21–7)

Second quarter

- (06:25) CLEM – Antonio Williams 4-yard pass from Cade Klubnik, Nolan Hauser kick (Drive: 10 plays, 75 yards, 4:39; DUKE 21–14)
- (06:25) CLEM – Adam Randall 2-yard run, Nolan Hauser kick (Drive: 7 plays, 68 yards, 2:39; Tied 21–21)
- (06:25) CLEM – Adam Randall 2-yard run, Nolan Hauser kick (Drive: 10 plays, 77 yards, 3:30; CLEM 28–21)
- (00:11) DUKE – Que'Sean Brown 43-yard pass from Darian Mensah, Todd Pelino kick (Drive: 7 plays, 75 yards, 0:50; Tied 28–28)

Third quarter

- (08:25) CLEM – Peter Woods 1-yard run, Nolan Hauser kick (Drive: 7 plays, 50 yards, 4:03; CLEM 35–28)
- (08:13) DUKE – Sahmir Hagans 100-yard kickoff return, Todd Pelino kick (Drive: N/A; Tied 35–35)
- (00:14) CLEM – Nolan Hauser 22-yard field goal (Drive: 15 plays, 71 yards, 7:59; CLEM 38–35)

Fourth quarter

- (10:40) DUKE – Todd Pelino 37-yard field goal (Drive: 12 plays, 55 yards, 4:34; Tied 38–38)
- (10:28) CLEM – T. J. Moore 75-yard pass from Cade Klubnik, Nolan Hauser kick (Drive: 1 play, 75 yards, 0:12; CLEM 45–38)
- (00:40) DUKE – Nate Sheppard 3-yard run, Sahmir Hagans pass from Darian Mensah for 2 pt conversion (Drive: 11 plays, 94 yards, 4:39; DUKE 46–45)

Statistics	DUKE	CLEM
First downs	22	28
Plays–yards	64–439	72–560
Rushes–yards	22–78	36–175
Passing yards	361	385
Passing: comp–att–int	27–42–0	27–36–0
Turnovers	0	0
Time of possession	25:35	34:26

Team	Category	Player	Statistics
Duke	Passing	Darian Mensah	27/41, 361 yards, 4 TD
Duke	Rushing	Nate Sheppard	13 carries, 60 yards, TD
Duke	Receiving	Cooper Barkate	6 receptions, 127 yards, TD
Clemson	Passing	Cade Klubnik	27/36, 385 yards, 2 TD
Clemson	Rushing	Adam Randall	16 carries, 89 yards, 2 TD
Clemson	Receiving	Antonio Williams	10 receptions, 142 yards, TD

=== at UConn ===
Duke Blue Devils (5–3) at UConn Huskies (6–3) – Game summary

Quarter	1	2	3	4	Total
Blue Devils	7	7	14	6	34
Huskies	10	10	3	14	37

at Pratt & Whitney Stadium at Rentschler Field • East Hartford, Connecticut

- Date: November 8
- Game time: 3:30 p.m. EDT
- Game weather: Sunny • Temperature: 60 °F (16 °C) • Wind: NW at 9 miles per hour (14 km/h)
- Game attendance: 38,106
- Referee: Darryl DeBerry
- TV announcers (CBSSN): Rich Waltz (play-by-play), Robert Turbin (analyst), and Tiffany Blackmon (sideline)

Game information

First quarter

- DUKE - Nate Sheppard 13-yard run (Todd Pelino kick), 12:31. Blue Devils 7–0. Drive: 3 plays, 55 yards, 01:05.
- CONN - Juice Vereen 10-yard pass from Joe Fagnano (Chris Freeman kick), 9:03. Tied 7–7. Drive: 7 plays, 70 yards, 03:28.
- CONN - Chris Freeman 29-yard field goal, 6:12. Huskies 10–7. Drive: 6 plays, 16 yards, 02:12.

Second quarter

- DUKE - Andrel Anthony 10-yard pass from Darian Mensah (Todd Pelino kick), 12:25. Blue Devils 14–10. Drive: 8 plays, 76 yards, 03:38.
- CONN - Skyler Bell 4-yard pass from Joe Fagnano (Chris Freeman kick), 5:59. Huskies 17–14. Drive: 12 plays, 73 yards, 06:21.
- CONN - Chris Freeman 45-yard field goal, 0:51. Huskies 20–14. Drive: 4 plays, 4 yards, 00:19.

Third quarter

- DUKE - Nate Sheppard 3-yard run (Todd Pelino kick), 10:13. Blue Devils 21–20. Drive: 9 plays, 75 yards, 04:47.
- CONN - Chris Freeman 20-yard field goal, 6:50. Huskies 23–21. Drive: 7 plays, 73 yards, 03:23.
- DUKE - Landen King 1-yard pass from Darian Mensah (Todd Pelino kick), 2:09. Blue Devils 28–23. Drive: 10 plays, 75 yards, 04:41.

Fourth quarter

- CONN - Cam Edwards 3-yard run (pass failed), 10:48. Huskies 29–28. Drive: 11 plays, 78 yards, 06:15.
- DUKE - Jeremiah Hasley 10-yard pass from Darian Mensah (pass failed), 5:34. Blue Devils 34–29. Drive: 11 plays, 80 yards, 05:09.
- CONN - Skyler Bell 19-yard pass from Joe Fagnano (Joe Fagnano run), 1:58. Huskies 37–34. Drive: 8 plays, 75 yards, 03:36.

Statistics	DUKE	UCONN
First downs	26	25
Plays–yards	65–390	70–467
Rushes–yards	34–168	30–156
Passing yards	222	311
Passing: comp–att–int	22–31–2	27–40–0
Turnovers	3	0
Time of possession	26:47	33:13

Team	Category	Player	Statistics
Duke	Passing	Darian Mensah	22/31, 222 yards, 3 TD
Duke	Rushing	Nate Sheppard	16 carries, 100 yards, 2 TD
Duke	Receiving	Que'sean Brown	5 receptions, 61 yards
UConn	Passing	Joe Fagnano	27/39, 311 yards, 3 TD
UConn	Rushing	Joe Fagnano	6 carries, 51 yards
UConn	Receiving	Reymello Murphy	5 receptions, 110 yards

=== No. 19 Virginia ===
No. 19 Virginia Cavaliers (8–2) at Duke Blue Devils (5–4) – Game summary

Quarter	1	2	3	4	Total
No. 19 Cavaliers	7	10	14	3	34
Blue Devils	0	3	0	14	17

at Wallace Wade Stadium • Durham, North Carolina

- Date: November 15
- Game time: 3:30 p.m. EST
- Game weather: Sunny
- Game attendance: 27,215
- Referee: Adam Savoie
- TV announcers (ESPN2): Mike Monaco (play-by-play), Kirk Morrison (analyst), and Dawn Davenport (sideline)

Game information

First quarter

- UVA – J'Mari Taylor 5-yard run (Will Bettridge kick), 8:13. Cavaliers 7–0. Drive: 14 plays, 75 yards, 6:47.

Second quarter

- DUKE – Todd Pelino 49-yard field goal, 5:33. Cavaliers 7–3. Drive: 11 plays, 33 yards, 5:49.
- UVA – Sage Ennis 12-yard pass from Chandler Morris (Will Bettridge kick), 1:39. Cavaliers 14–3. Drive: 9 plays, 75 yards, 3:54.
- UVA – Will Bettridge 44-yard field goal, 0:00. Cavaliers 17–3. Drive: 6 plays, 42 yards, 1:00.

Third quarter

- UVA – Trell Harris 20-yard pass from Chandler Morris (Will Bettridge kick), 6:49. Cavaliers 24–3. Drive: 10 plays, 87 yards, 5:08.
- UVA – J'Mari Taylor 78-yard run (Will Bettridge kick), 2:27. Cavaliers 31–3. Drive: 3 plays, 86 yards, 1:32.

Fourth quarter

- DUKE – Cooper Barkate 11-yard pass from Darian Mensah (Todd Pelino kick), 10:23. Cavaliers 31–10. Drive: 12 plays, 72 yards, 3:42.
- DUKE – Tre Freeman 18-yard interception return (Todd Pelino kick), 9:30. Cavaliers 31–17.
- UVA – Will Bettridge 42-yard field goal, 5:42. Cavaliers 34–17. Drive: 7 plays, 50 yards, 3:48.

Statistics	UVA	DUKE
First downs	22	11
Plays–yards	77–540	58–255
Rushes–yards	42–224	23–42
Passing yards	316	213
Passing: comp–att–int	23–35–2	18–35–0
Turnovers	2	1
Time of possession	35:58	24:02

Team	Category	Player	Statistics
Virginia	Passing	Chandler Morris	23/35, 316 yards, 2 TD, 2 INT
Virginia	Rushing	J'Mari Taylor	18 carries, 133 yards, 2 TD
Virginia	Receiving	Trell Harris	8 receptions, 161 yards, TD
Duke	Passing	Darian Mensah	18/35, 213 yards, TD
Duke	Rushing	Nate Sheppard	12 carries, 43 yards
Duke	Receiving	Landen King	2 receptions, 48 yards

=== at North Carolina (Victory Bell) ===
Duke Blue Devils (5–5) at North Carolina Tar Heels (4–6) – Game summary

Quarter	1	2	3	4	Total
Blue Devils	7	10	7	8	32
Tar Heels	7	3	8	7	25

at Kenan Stadium • Chapel Hill, North Carolina

- Date: November 22
- Game time: 3:30 p.m. EST
- Game weather: Sunny, 73 °F (23 °C)
- Game attendance: 50,500
- Referee: Justin Elliott
- TV announcers (ACCN): Wes Durham (play-by-play), Steve Addazio (analyst) and Dana Boyle (sideline)

Game information

First quarter

- UNC – Gio Lopez 1-yard run (Rece Verhoff kick), 7:57. Tar Heels 7–0. Drive: 13 plays, 75 yards, 7:03.
- DUKE – Anderson Castle 1-yard run (Todd Pelino kick), 2:59. Tied 7–7. Drive: 10 plays, 53 yards, 4:51.

Second quarter

- DUKE – Jeremiah Hasley 14-yard pass from Darian Mensah (Todd Pelino kick), 10:25. Blue Devils 14–7. Drive: 13 plays, 78 yards, 6:11.
- DUKE – Todd Pelino 33-yard field goal, 2:33. Blue Devils 17–7. Drive: 14 plays, 71 yards, 6:51.
- UNC – Rece Verhoff 49-yard field goal, 0:07. Blue Devils 17–10. Drive: 8 plays, 44 yards, 2:26.

Third quarter

- DUKE – Anderson Castle 1-yard run (Todd Pelino kick), 9:15. Blue Devils 24–10. Drive: 11 plays, 44 yards, 5:45.
- UNC – Jordan Shipp 20-yard pass from Gio Lopez (Gio Lopez pass to Jordan Shipp), 4:52. Blue Devils 24–18. Drive: 10 plays, 74 yards, 4:23.

Fourth quarter

- UNC – Davion Gause 12-yard run (Rece Verhoff kick), 13:13. Tar Heels 25–24. Drive: 9 plays, 91 yards, 4:30.
- DUKE – Anderson Castle 1-yard run (Darian Mensah pass to Nate Sheppard), 2:18. Blue Devils 32–25. Drive: 11 plays, 67 yards, 4:19.

Statistics	DUKE	UNC
First downs	24	18
Plays–yards	76–352	52–305
Rushes–yards	43–177	25–101
Passing yards	175	204
Passing: comp–att–int	20–33–0	21–27–0
Turnovers	0	0
Time of possession	36:00	24:00

Team	Category	Player	Statistics
Duke	Passing	Darian Mensah	20/33, 175 yards, TD
Duke	Rushing	Nate Sheppard	22 carries, 90 yards
Duke	Receiving	Jeremiah Hasley	7 receptions, 85 yards, TD
North Carolina	Passing	Gio Lopez	21/27, 204 yards, TD
North Carolina	Rushing	Davion Gause	8 carries, 63 yards, TD
North Carolina	Receiving	Jordan Shipp	8 receptions, 83 yards, TD

=== Wake Forest (rivalry) ===
Wake Forest Demon Deacons (8–3) at Duke Blue Devils (6–5) – Game summary

Quarter	1	2	3	4	Total
Demon Deacons	3	14	8	7	32
Blue Devils	14	7	14	14	49

at Wallace Wade Stadium • Durham, North Carolina

- Date: November 29
- Game time: 3:30 p.m. EST
- Game weather: Sunny, 42 °F (6 °C)
- Game attendance: 21,045
- Referee: Nolan Dumas
- TV announcers (ACCN): Wes Durham (play-by-play), Steve Addazio (analyst) and Dana Boyle (sideline)

Game information

First quarter

- DUKE – Nate Sheppard 5-yard run (Todd Pelino kick), 10:36. Blue Devils 7–0. Drive: 8 plays, 75 yards, 4:24.
- WAKE – Connor Calvert 42-yard field goal, 5:59. Blue Devils 7–3. Drive: 10 plays, 46 yards, 4:31.
- DUKE – Darian Mensah 4-yard run (Todd Pelino kick), 0:00. Blue Devils 14–3. Drive: 10 plays, 75 yards, 5:59.

Second quarter

- WAKE – Sawyer Racanelli 22-yard pass from Robby Ashford (Connor Calvert kick), 11:56. Blue Devils 14–10. Drive: 10 plays, 75 yards, 3:04.
- DUKE – Anderson Castle 1-yard run (Todd Pelino kick), 1:38. Blue Devils 21–10. Drive: 7 plays, 34 yards, 2:24.
- WAKE – Karate Benson 20-yard pass from Robby Ashford (Connor Calvert kick), 0:29. Blue Devils 21–17. Drive: 8 plays, 75 yards, 1:09.

Third quarter

- DUKE – Sahmir Hagans 30-yard pass from Darian Mensah (Todd Pelino kick), 9:45. Blue Devils 28–17. Drive: 2 plays, 35 yards, 0:31.
- DUKE – Anderson Castle 2-yard run (Todd Pelino kick), 3:51. Blue Devils 35–17. Drive: 8 plays, 66 yards, 4:15.
- WAKE – Robby Ashford 10-yard run (Robby Ashford run), 0:00. Blue Devils 35–25. Drive: 9 plays, 75 yards, 3:52.

Fourth quarter

- DUKE – Nate Sheppard 13-yard run (Todd Pelino kick), 13:57. Blue Devils 42–25. Drive: 2 plays, 13 yards, 1:01.
- WAKE – Ty Clark III 1-yard run (Connor Calvert kick), 11:13. Blue Devils 42–32. Drive: 10 plays, 83 yards, 2:41.
- DUKE – Jeremiah Hasley 11-yard pass from Darian Mensah (Todd Pelino kick), 0:23. Blue Devils 49–32. Drive: 4 plays, 11 yards, 1:39.

Statistics	WAKE	DUKE
First downs	27	24
Plays–yards	75–468	74–378
Rushes–yards	32–126	39–110
Passing yards	342	268
Passing: comp–att–int	27–43–1	24–35–0
Turnovers	4	0
Time of possession	25:21	34:39

Team	Category	Player	Statistics
Wake Forest	Passing	Robby Ashford	27/43, 342 yards, 2 TD, INT
Wake Forest	Rushing	Demond Claiborne	13 carries, 58 yards
Wake Forest	Receiving	Sawyer Racanelli	7 receptions, 123 yards, TD
Duke	Passing	Darian Mensah	24/35, 268 yards, 2 TD
Duke	Rushing	Nate Sheppard	23 carries, 75 yards, 2 TD
Duke	Receiving	Cooper Barkate	8 receptions, 83 yards

=== vs. No. 17 Virginia (ACC Championship Game) ===
2025 ACC Championship Game
Duke Blue Devils (7–5) vs. No. 17 Virginia Cavaliers (10–2) – Game summary

Quarter	1	2	3	4	OT	Total
Blue Devils	7	7	3	3	7	27
No. 17 Cavaliers	0	7	3	10	0	20

at Bank of America Stadium • Charlotte, North Carolina

- Date: December 6
- Game time: 8:00 p.m. EST
- Game weather: Cloudy • Temperature: 39 °F (4 °C) • Wind: W at 1 mile per hour (1.6 km/h)
- Game attendance: 41,672
- Referee: Jerry Magallanes
- TV announcers (ABC): Sean McDonough (play-by-play), Greg McElroy (analyst), Molly McGrath, and Taylor McGregor (sideline reporters)

Game information

First quarter

- DUKE – Jeremiah Halsey 12-yard pass from Darian Mensah (Todd Pelino kick), 10:40. Blue Devils 7–0. Drive: 15 plays, 75 yards, 9:38.

Second quarter

- UVA – J'Mari Taylor 11-yard pass from Chandler Morris (Will Bettridge kick), 14:16. Tied 7–7. Drive: 3 plays, 23 yards, 1:31.
- DUKE – Nate Sheppard 16-yard run (Todd Pelino kick), 6:14. Blue Devils 14–7. Drive: 13 plays, 75 yards, 8:02.

Third quarter

- UVA – Will Bettridge 24-yard field goal, 7:19. Blue Devils 14–10. Drive: 17 plays, 68 yards, 7:41.
- DUKE – Todd Pelino 29-yard field goal, 3:53. Blue Devils 17–10. Drive: 6 plays, 63 yards, 3:26.

Fourth quarter

- DUKE – Todd Pelino 23-yard field goal, 5:02. Blue Devils 20–10. Drive: 5 plays, 28 yards, 2:19.
- UVA – Will Bettridge 42-yard field goal, 3:54. Blue Devils 20–13. Drive: 8 plays, 50 yards, 1:08.
- UVA – Eli Wood 18-yard pass from Chandler Morris (Will Bettridge kick), 0:22. Tied 20–20. Drive: 10 plays, 96 yards, 1:22.

Overtime

- DUKE – Jeremiah Hasley 1-yard run (Todd Pelino kick). Blue Devils 27–20. Drive: 7 plays, 25 yards.

Statistics	DUKE	UVA
First downs	19	25
Plays–yards	69–333	69–344
Rushes–yards	44–137	29–128
Passing yards	196	216
Passing: comp–att–int	19–25–1	21–40–2
Turnovers	1	2
Time of possession	34:24	25:36

Team	Category	Player	Statistics
Duke	Passing	Darian Mensah	19/25, 196 yards, 2 TD, INT
Duke	Rushing	Nate Sheppard	21 rushes, 97 yards, TD
Duke	Receiving	Cooper Barkate	5 receptions, 91 yards
Virginia	Passing	Chandler Morris	21/40, 216 yards, 2 TD, 2 INT
Virginia	Rushing	Harrison Waylee	11 rushes, 66 yards
Virginia	Receiving	Cam Ross	5 receptions, 59 yards

=== vs. Arizona State (Sun Bowl) ===
2025 Tony the Tiger Sun Bowl
Arizona State Sun Devils (8–4) vs. Duke Blue Devils (8–5) – Game summary

Quarter	1	2	3	4	Total
Sun Devils	14	10	8	7	39
Blue Devils	14	14	7	7	42

at Sun Bowl • El Paso, TX

- Date: December 31
- Game time: 2:00 p.m. EDT
- Game weather: Sunny • Temperature: 55 °F (13 °C) • Wind: 2 mph (3.2 km/h) north
- Game attendance: 44,975
- Referee: Tim O'Dey
- TV announcers (CBS): Brad Nessler (play-by-play), Gary Danielson (analyst), and Jenny Dell (sideline)

Game information

First quarter

- ASU – Jeff Sims 4-yard run (Jesus Gomez kick), 10:11. Sun Devils 7–0. Drive: 9 plays, 83 yards, 2:57.
- DUKE – Que'Sean Brown 69-yard pass from Darian Mensah (Todd Pelino kick), 8:53. Tied 7–7. Drive: 3 plays, 75 yards, 1:18.
- DUKE – Cooper Barkate 3-yard pass from Darian Mensah (Todd Pelino kick), 6:43. Blue Devils 14–7. Drive: 4 plays, 49 yards, 0:43.
- ASU – Jalen Moss 44-yard pass from Jeff Sims (Jesus Gomez kick), 5:05. Tied 14–14. Drive: 5 plays, 75 yards, 1:38.

Second quarter

- DUKE – Jeremiah Hasley 14-yard pass from Darian Mensah (Todd Pelino kick), 6:06. Blue Devils 21–14. Drive: 12 plays, 60 yards, 5:22.
- ASU – Jeff Sims 38-yard run (Jesus Gomez kick), 3:49. Tied 21–21. Drive: 6 plays, 75 yards, 2:17.
- DUKE – Anderson Castle 3-yard run (Todd Pelino kick), 1:50. Blue Devils 28–21. Drive: 5 plays, 44 yards, 1:59.
- ASU – Jesus Gomez 54-yard field goal, 0:32. Blue Devils 28–24. Drive: 6 plays, 24 yards, 1:18.

Third quarter

- DUKE – Nate Sheppard 3-yard run (Todd Pelino kick), 5:20. Blue Devils 35–24. Drive: 7 plays, 64 yards, 3:06.
- ASU – Khamari Anderson 8-yard pass from Jeff Sims (Jeff Sims run), 4:09. Blue Devils 35–32. Drive: 4 plays, 75 yards, 1:11.

Fourth quarter

- ASU – Malik McClain 6-yard pass from Jeff Sims (Jesus Gomez kick), 12:31. Sun Devils 39–35. Drive: 7 plays, 77 yards, 2:29.
- DUKE – Que'Sean Brown 17-yard pass from Darian Mensah (Todd Pelino kick), 2:10. Blue Devils 39–35. Drive: 2 plays, 22 yards, 0:32.

Statistics	ASU	DUKE
First downs	22	24
Plays–yards	75–619	87–539
Rushes–yards	37–244	36–212
Passing yards	375	327
Passing: comp–att–int	27–38–1	29–51–1
Turnovers	3	1
Time of possession	26:33	33:07

Team	Category	Player	Statistics
Arizona State	Passing	Jeff Sims	27/38, 375 yards, 3 TD, INT
Arizona State	Rushing	Jason Brown Jr.	13 carries, 134 yards
Arizona State	Receiving	Jalen Moss	5 receptions, 129 yards, TD
Duke	Passing	Darian Mensah	29/51, 327 yards, 4 TD, INT
Duke	Rushing	Nate Sheppard	22 carries, 170 yards, TD
Duke	Receiving	Que'Sean Brown	10 receptions, 178 yards, 2 TD
