= 2025 Sun Bowl =

Postseason college football bowl game

2025 Tony the Tiger Sun Bowl
- 92nd Sun Bowl
Arizona State Sun Devils	Duke Blue Devils
(8–4)	(8–5)
Big 12	ACC
39	42
Head coach: Kenny Dillingham	Head coach: Manny Diaz
	1	2	3	4	Total
Arizona State	14	10	8	7	39
Duke	14	14	7	7	42
- Date: December 31, 2025
- Season: 2025
- Stadium: Sun Bowl
- Location: El Paso, Texas
- MVP: Darian Mensah (QB, Duke)
- Favorite: Duke by 3
- Referee: Tim O'Dey (Big Ten)
- Attendance: 44,975

United States TV coverage
- Network: CBS
- Announcers: Brad Nessler (play-by-play), Gary Danielson (analyst), and Jenny Dell (sideline)

The 2025 Sun Bowl was a college football bowl game played on December 31, 2025, at the Sun Bowl in El Paso, Texas. The 92nd annual Sun Bowl game began at approximately 12:00 p.m. MST and aired on CBS. It was one of the 2025–26 bowl games concluding the 2025 FBS football season. For sponsorship reasons, the game was officially named the Tony the Tiger Sun Bowl, named after the mascot of Frosted Flakes breakfast cereal. (Note: Corporate ownership of Frosted Flakes passed from Kellogg's to WK Kellogg Co in 2023; the latter was acquired by Italian confectioner Ferrero International SpA in 2025.)

The Duke Blue Devils from the Atlantic Coast Conference (ACC) defeated the Arizona State Sun Devils from the Big 12 Conference, 42–39.

== Teams ==
The game featured Arizona State from the Big 12 Conference, selected to this bowl as a legacy member of the Pac-12 Conference, and Duke, champions of the Atlantic Coast Conference (ACC). This was the second-ever meeting between the two teams, the first one having been the 2014 Sun Bowl, which was won by Arizona State, 36–31.

=== Arizona State Sun Devils ===
Arizona State compiled an 8–4 record and were intermittently ranked during the regular season. The Sun Devils defeated two ranked FBS teams, TCU and Texas Tech, and lost to one ranked team, Arizona.

=== Duke Blue Devils ===
Duke posted a 7–5 regular-season record and qualified for the 2025 ACC Championship Game on December 6, which they won in overtime against Virginia in a rematch. Three of the Blue Devils' five losses were against ranked teams: Illinois, Georgia Tech, and Virginia in mid-November. Duke entered the Sun Bowl with an 8–5 record.

== Game summary ==
2025 Tony the Tiger Sun Bowl

Quarter	1	2	3	4	Total
Arizona State	14	10	8	7	39
Duke	14	14	7	7	42

at Sun Bowl • El Paso, Texas

- Date: December 31, 2025
- Game time: 12:00 p.m. MST
- Game weather: Sunny • Temperature: 55 °F (13 °C) • Wind: 2 mph (3.2 km/h) north
- Game attendance: 44,975
- Referee: Tim O'Dey
- TV announcers (CBS): Brad Nessler (play-by-play), Gary Danielson (analyst), and Jenny Dell (sideline)
- Box score

=== Statistics ===
Statistics	ASU	DUKE
First downs	22	24
Plays–yards	75–619	87–539
Rushes–yards	37–244	36–212
Passing yards	375	327
Passing: comp–att–int	27–38–1	29–51–1
Turnovers		
Time of possession	26:33	33:07

Team	Category	Player	Statistics
Arizona State	Passing	Jeff Sims	27/38, 3 TD, 1 INT
Arizona State	Rushing	Jason Brown Jr.	13 rushes, 134 yards
Arizona State	Receiving	Jalen Moss	5 rec, 129 yards, 1 TD
Duke	Passing	Darian Mensah	29/51, 4 TD, 1 INT
Duke	Rushing	Nate Sheppard	22 rushes, 170 yards, 1 TD
Duke	Receiving	Que'Sean Brown	10 rec, 178 yards, 2 TD
