= Letterman =

Letterman may refer to:

- Letterman (sports), a classification of high school or college athlete in the United States

== People ==
- David Letterman (born 1947), American television talk show host
  - Late Night with David Letterman, talk show that aired on NBC from 1982 to 1993
  - Late Show with David Letterman, talk show that aired on CBS from 1993 to 2015
  - My Next Guest Needs No Introduction with David Letterman, talk show carried by Netflix from 2018 to present
  - Live on Letterman
  - The Letterman Foundation for Courtesy and Grooming, a private foundation owned by David Letterman
  - Rahal Letterman Lanigan Racing, an auto racing team
- Jonathan Letterman (1824–1872), American surgeon known as the "Father of Battlefield Medicine" and brother of William Henry
- William Henry Letterman (1832–1881), co-founder of the Phi Kappa Psi fraternity and brother of Jonathan
- Russell Letterman (1933–1990)
- Rob Letterman (born 1970), American filmmaker

== Places ==
- Letterman Digital Arts Center, the home of several Lucasfilm units, located on the site of the former Letterman Army Hospital
- Letterman Army Hospital, hospital operating from 1898 to 1995 on the Presidio of San Francisco, named after Jonathan Letterman
- Camp Letterman

== Art and culture ==
- The Lettermen, musical group
- "Letterman", a 2017 song by American rapper Wiz Khalifa
- The protagonist superhero from The Adventures of Letterman, an animated segment on the children's show The Electric Company

== See also ==
- Mail carrier
