= Darian Mensah =

American football player (born 2005)

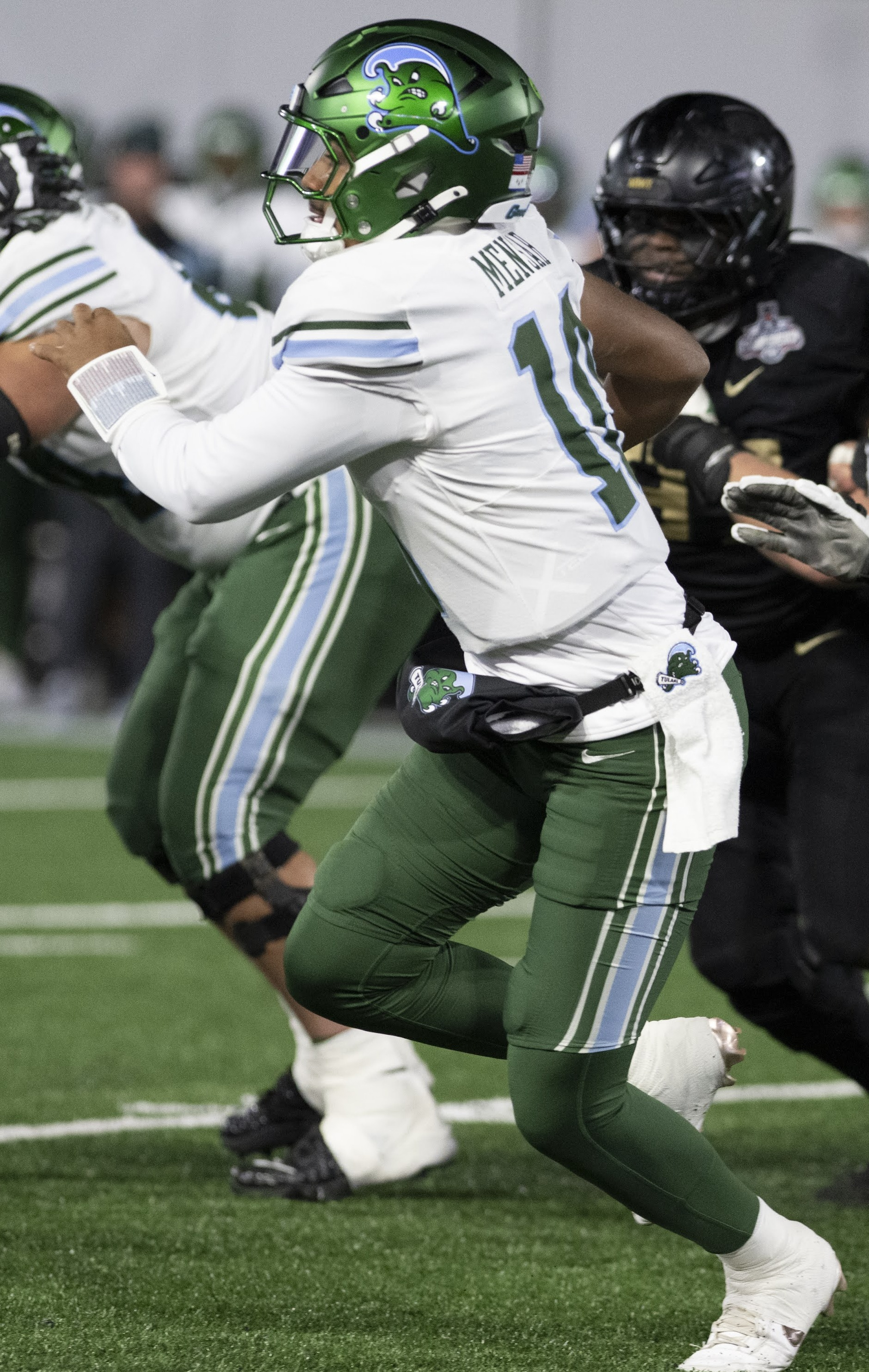
- Mensah with Tulane during the 2024 American Athletic Conference Football Championship Game

No. 10 – Miami Hurricanes
- Position: Quarterback
- Class: Redshirt Junior

Personal information
- Born: January 25, 2005 (age 21)
- Listed height: 6 ft 3 in (1.91 m)
- Listed weight: 205 lb (93 kg)

Career information
- High school: St. Joseph (Santa Maria, California)
- College: Tulane (2023–2024); Duke (2025); Miami (FL) (2026–present)

Awards and highlights
- Second-team All-ACC (2025)
- Stats at ESPN

Darian Okoe Mensah (born January 25, 2005) is an American college football quarterback for the Miami Hurricanes. He previously played for the Tulane Green Wave and Duke Blue Devils.

== Early life ==
Mensah grew up in San Luis Obispo, California. He attended St. Joseph High School in Santa Maria, California. As a senior, he was the Mountain League Player of the Year after passing for 2,256 with 25 total touchdowns. He committed to Tulane University to play college football.

== College career ==
=== Tulane ===
After redshirting his first year at Tulane in 2023, Mensah was named the Green Wave’s starting quarterback for the 2024 season, winning the job in fall camp over Kai Horton and former Oregon transfer Ty Thompson. He made an immediate impact in his first collegiate start against Southeastern Louisiana, throwing for 205 yards and two touchdowns in a 52–0 victory, and followed it with a career-high 342 passing yards and two touchdowns in a 34–27 loss to No. 17 Kansas State.

Mensah started all 13 games during the 2024 season, finishing the year with 189 completions on 287 attempts (65.9 percent) for 2,723 yards, 22 touchdowns, and six interceptions, while adding 132 rushing yards and a touchdown. He threw for 300 yards or more in three games and recorded multiple touchdown passes in eight contests.

Under Mensah’s leadership, Tulane posted a 9–4 record, reached the American Athletic Conference Championship Game, and earned a berth in the Gasparilla Bowl. He led the AAC in completion percentage, yards per attempt, and passer rating.

On December 8, 2024, Mensah announced his intention to enter the NCAA transfer portal and subsequently opted out of Tulane’s bowl game. He was regarded as the top-rated player in the transfer portal by ESPN before committing to Duke.

=== Duke ===
On December 11, 2024, Mensah announced he would be transferring to Duke University.

Mensah opened his Duke career with a 45–17 win over Elon, throwing three touchdown passes for 389 yards. Duke then faced early challenges, including consecutive losses to Illinois and a 34–27 defeat against Mensah’s former team, Tulane, in which he threw for 313 yards, three touchdowns, and one interception.

He then led Duke through a five-game stretch in which the team went 4–1, completing 71 percent of his passes with a 13–0 touchdown-to-interception ratio. This included a standout performance on November 1 against Clemson, where he threw for 361 yards, four touchdowns, and completed a game-winning two-point conversion in the final minute to secure a 46–45 victory, keeping Duke in ACC Championship contention.

Mensah finished the regular season completing 67.9 percent of his passes for 3,646 yards, 30 touchdown passes, and five interceptions. He ranked among the national leaders in passing yards and touchdowns, set a Duke single-season record for passing touchdowns—breaking Maalik Murphy’s 2024 record—and also led the ACC in passing yards and touchdowns. He was named Second-team All-ACC.

Duke earned a berth in the Atlantic Coast Conference Championship Game, where Mensah led the team to a 27–20 overtime victory over No. 16 Virginia, avenging their earlier-season defeat. He completed 19 of 25 passes for 196 yards and two touchdowns, including the go-ahead score in overtime. The win secured Duke’s first outright ACC championship since 1962 and ended Virginia’s College Football Playoff hopes.

Following the ACC Championship, Mensah announced he would return to Duke for the 2026 season, forgoing the 2026 NFL Draft. He had signed a two-year, $8 million NIL contract with Duke in 2024 upon transferring from Tulane.

Duke concluded the season with a 42–39 victory over Arizona State in the 2025 Sun Bowl, the highest-scoring Sun Bowl in history. Mensah threw for 327 yards, four touchdowns, and one interception, earning Sun Bowl MVP honors for his performance. In the game, Mensah set a new single-season school record with 3,973 passing yards, surpassing Anthony Dilweg's 1988 mark. He also established new single-season school records for total offensive yards (3,941) and total touchdowns (35), breaking the previous marks set by Dilweg and Riley Leonard.

On January 16, 2026, Mensah decided to enter the transfer portal and leave Duke. On January 20, Duke sued Mensah, attempting to prevent him from entering the transfer portal, citing a breach of contract.

=== Miami ===
On January 27, 2026, Mensah committed to play for the Miami Hurricanes.

=== Statistics ===
Season	Team	Games			Passing								Rushing			
Season	Team	GP	GS	Record	Cmp	Att	Pct	Yds	Y/A	TD	Int	Rtg	Att	Yds	Avg	TD
2023	Tulane	0	0	—	Redshirted (redshirt)											
2024	Tulane	13	13	9–4	189	287	65.9	2,723	9.5	22	6	166.7	60	132	2.2	1
2025	Duke	14	14	9–5	334	500	66.8	3,973	7.9	34	6	155.3	59	–32	-0.5	1
2026	Miami	11	11	10–1	267	354	75.4	3,317	9.4	29	4	179.2	46	168'	3.7	2
Career		38	38	28–10	790	1,141	69.2	10,013	8.8	85	16	164.7	165	268	1.6	4
