= J'Mari Taylor =

American football player (born 2002)

No. 30 – Jacksonville Jaguars
- Position: Running back
- Roster status: Practice squad

Personal information
- Born: March 15, 2002 (age 24)
- Listed height: 5 ft 9 in (1.75 m)
- Listed weight: 204 lb (93 kg)

Career information
- High school: West Mecklenburg (Charlotte, North Carolina)
- College: North Carolina Central (2020–2024); Virginia (2025)
- NFL draft: 2026: undrafted

Career history
- Jacksonville Jaguars (2026–present)*
- * Offseason or practice squad member only

Awards and highlights
- First-team All-ACC (2025)
- Stats at Pro Football Reference

J'Mari Taylor (born March 15, 2002) is an American professional football running back for the Jacksonville Jaguars of the National Football League (NFL). He played college football for the North Carolina Central Eagles and Virginia Cavaliers. He went undrafted in the 2026 NFL draft.

== Career ==
Taylor attended West Mecklenburg High School in Charlotte, North Carolina. He joined North Carolina Central University as a walk-on in 2020. He played for the Eagles from 2020 to 2024, rushing for 1,882 yards, including 1,146 with 15 touchdowns his final year in 2024. After the 2024 season, he entered the transfer portal and transferred to University of Virginia. He was the Cavaliers starting running back in 2025.

== Professional career ==
Pre-draft measurables
| Height | Weight | Arm length | Hand span | Wingspan | 40-yard dash | 10-yard split | 20-yard split | Vertical jump | Broad jump | Bench press |
|---|---|---|---|---|---|---|---|---|---|---|
| 5 ft 9 7/8 in (1.77 m) | 199 lb (90 kg) | 30 in (0.76 m) | 9 in (0.23 m) | 6 ft 0 7/8 in (1.85 m) | 4.66 s | 1.63 s | 2.60 s | 34.5 in (0.88 m) | 9 ft 7 in (2.92 m) | 20 reps |
All values from NFL Combine/Pro Day

On April 26, 2026, Taylor signed with the Jacksonville Jaguars as an undrafted free agent. On August 30, Taylor was waived by Jacksonville as a part of final roster cuts; he was re-signed to the team's practice squad the next day.
