= Nate Sheppard =

American football player (born 2006)

No. 20 – Duke Blue Devils
- Position: Running back
- Class: Sophomore

Personal information
- Born: August 24, 2006 (age 20)
- Listed height: 5 ft 10 in (1.78 m)
- Listed weight: 195 lb (88 kg)

Career information
- High school: Mandeville (Mandeville, Louisiana)
- College: Duke (2025–present)

Awards and highlights
- Second-team All-ACC (2025)
- Stats at ESPN

Nate Sheppard (born August 24, 2006) is an American college football player who is a running back for the Duke Blue Devils.

== Early life ==
Nate Sheppard was born on August 24, 2006, to Willie Sheppard and Rebekah Boyd, both of whom were Division I athletes at Louisiana Tech University. Boyd played volleyball, while Willie Sheppard played cornerback for the Louisiana Tech Bulldogs. Nate began playing football recreationally when he was four years old. He attended Mandeville High School, where he played football, basketball, and track and field.

As a sophomore, he led the football team in rushing and receiving yards and scored 25 total touchdowns. He was the Allstate Sugar Bowl Amateur Athlete of the Month twice in 2024. As a junior, Sheppard rushed for 1,816 yards and 32 touchdowns, before his senior season was shortened after he broke his fibula during a game against Ponchatoula High School. After sustaining the injury, Sheppard hopped on one leg for 40 yards to reach the sidelines. The injury ended his high school career, although he continued to attend teem meetings and practices.

Following his high school career, Sheppard was a four star recruit. He passed over offers from California, Cincinnati, Northwestern, and Tulane. Nate's father Willie was recruited as a running back in college before switching to cornerback, a decision which he regretted. Because of this, he advised Nate not to accept an offer to play as a defensive back instead of Nate's preferred position as running back. Nate was ultimately recruited by coach Willie Simmons for Duke University. While eating breakfast with Simmons, Willie recalled tackling Simmons during the 2001 Humanitarian Bowl.

Sheppard graduated early to attend Duke University's spring practice camp in Durham, North Carolina. At the time, he stated his intention to major in kinesiology, citing his interest in sports science and physical therapy.

== College career ==
=== 2025 ===
Sheppard started at Duke University as a running back, and was the first true freshman to start at running back at Duke in fifteen years. Sheppard's first career start was against Syracuse on September 27, 2025. He totaled 15 carries for 168 yards and two touchdowns while also tallying 33 yards receiving. For his performance, he was named the Atlantic Coast Conference (ACC) running back and rookie of the week. In the first six games of the season, he totaled 56 carries, ran for 447 yards, and scored four touchdowns.

In the entire 2025 season, Sheppard ran for 1,132 yards and scored 11 touchdowns, averaging 5.7 yards per carry. He ranked second in the ACC in rushing yards, fourth in average rushing yards per game, and fifth in rushing touchdowns and average yards per carry. He totaled five carries in each of the first three games of the season, and totaled more than ten in each subsequent game. Sheppard was the sixth player in the Blue Devils' history to total 1,000 or more yards in a season, and the team's first freshman to do so.

That year, Sheppard was picked for the All-ACC second team, The Athletic's Freshman All-America team. He was one of ESPN's top ten freshmen of the year. Sheppard was included in the 2025 Shaun Alexander Freshman of the Year Award Watch List. He was described as one of the best true freshmen of 2025 by Sports Illustrated, and ranked by the magazine as the third best running back in the ACC entering the 2026 season. He tied for tenth place on ESPN's list of the best running backs entering the 2026 season.

=== 2026 ===
Sheppard started the 2026 season playing against Tulane at Wallace Wade Stadium on September 10, where he ran for 227 rushing yards, totaled 35 carries, and scored two touchdowns. This marked his highest number of carries in a single game, and the best statistical performance for any running back that week. He was named the ACC Running Back of the Week, and became the first Duke player to be named Doak Walker Running Back of the Week.

Against Virginia, Sheppard surpassed 2,000 rushing yards in his career, having played only 21 games. Against Boston College, Sheppard broke Duke's single-game rushing touchdown record after rushing for five touchdowns, and was named ACC Running Back of the Week. He ran for 217 yards and scored three touchdowns in a 41-3 win against NC State. This brought his season total to 21 touchdowns, the highest of any player in the 2026 season and the best single-season performance for any Duke player. He was named Doak Walker Running Back of the Week for the second time.

Hugh Straine of Sports Illustrated wrote that "Sheppard has been one of the most unstoppable players in college football this season, and he might be the most valuable player in the entire sport." The Athletic noted the emergence of Nate Sheppard as one of the biggest surprises in 2026, noting that he was "the nation’s leading rusher." Sports analyst Jared Feinberg described him as the team's "best player, the engine of the offense, and one of the leaders of the program as a true sophomore".

He was included on the 2026 College Football Midseason All-America teams of Sports Illustrated, The Associated Press, CBS and On3.

Sports Illustrated noted that Sheppard was one of the most valuable players in the sport, and predicted that he was a likely contender for the Heisman Trophy. ESPN also ranked Sheppard among the top five players most likely to win.

Alex Long of the Duke Chronicle described Sheppard as having a "patient" playing style that "balance[s] between endurance and explosion".

=== Statistics ===
Year	Team	Games		Rushing				Receiving			
Year	Team	GP	GS	Att	Yds	Avg	TD	Rec	Yds	Avg	TD
2025	Duke	14	10	200	1,132	5.7	11	37	286	7.7	1
2026	Duke	9	8	191	1,189	6.2	17	32	306	9.6	4
Career		23	18	391	2,321	5.9	28	69	592	8.6	5

== Personal life ==
Sheppard's older brother, Will, is a professional football wide receiver for the Miami Dolphins. Nate Sheppard stated that he has a "friendly, brotherly [football] rivalry" with his brother.
