= 2025 Toledo Rockets football team =

American college football season

2025 Toledo Rockets football

Boca Raton Bowl, L 22–27 vs. Louisville
- Conference: Mid-American Conference
- Record: 8–5 (6–2 MAC)
- Head coach: Jason Candle (10th season; regular season); Robert Weiner (interim, bowl game)
- Co-offensive coordinators: Mike Hallett (6th season); Robert Weiner (6th season)
- Offensive scheme: Spread
- Defensive coordinator: Vince Kehres (6th season)
- Co-defensive coordinator: Ross Watson (6th season)
- Base defense: 4–2–5
- Home stadium: Glass Bowl

2025 Mid-American Conference football standings
	Conf.			Overall
Team	W		L	W		L
Western Michigan y$	7	–	1	10	–	4
Miami (OH) y	6	–	2	7	–	7
Ohio	6	–	2	9	–	4
Toledo	6	–	2	8	–	5
Central Michigan	5	–	3	7	–	6
Akron*	4	–	4	5	–	7
Buffalo	4	–	4	5	–	7
Kent State	4	–	4	5	–	7
Eastern Michigan	3	–	5	4	–	8
Ball State	3	–	5	4	–	8
Bowling Green	2	–	6	4	–	8
Northern Illinois	2	–	6	3	–	9
UMass	0	–	8	0	–	12
Championship: Western Michigan 23, Miami (OH) 13
$ – Conference champion; y – Championship game participant; * Ineligible for postseason play due to low APR score

The 2025 Toledo Rockets football team represented the University of Toledo in the Mid-American Conference (MAC) during the 2025 NCAA Division I FBS football season. The team played their home games at the Glass Bowl, located in Toledo, Ohio. The Rockets were led by 10th-year head coach Jason Candle during the regular season. In early December, Robert Weiner was named interim head coach for the Boca Raton Bowl after Candle left the program to become head coach at UConn.

== Preseason ==
The MAC Football Kickoff was held on Thursday, July 24, 2025 at the Ford Field in Detroit, Michigan from 9:00 am EDT to 1:30 pm EDT.

=== Preseason polls ===
==== Coaches Poll ====
On July 24 the MAC announced the preseason coaches' poll.

MAC Coaches poll
Predicted finish	Team	Votes (1st place)
1	Toledo	135 (7)
2	Miami	131 (3)
3	Ohio	123 (3)
4	Buffalo	115
5	Northern Illinois	94
6	Bowling Green	81
7	Western Michigan	71
8	Eastern Michigan	68
9	Central Michigan	65
10	Ball State	41
T11	Akron	39
T11	Massachusetts	39
13	Kent State	12

Coaches poll (MAC Championship)
Predicted finish	Team	Votes
1	Toledo	6
2	Miami	4
3	Ohio	3

== Schedule ==
Date	Time	Opponent	Site	TV	Result	Attendance
August 30	12:45 p.m.	at Kentucky*	Kroger Field; Lexington, KY	SECN	L 16–24	56,457
September 6	7:00 p.m.	Western Kentucky*	Glass Bowl; Toledo, OH	ESPN+	W 45–21	24,138
September 13	3:30 p.m.	Morgan State*	Glass Bowl; Toledo, OH	ESPN+	W 60–0	22,846
September 20	3:30 p.m.	at Western Michigan	Waldo Stadium; Kalamazoo, MI	ESPN+	L 13–14	20,744
September 27	3:30 p.m.	Akron	Glass Bowl; Toledo, OH	ESPN+	W 45–3	24,535
October 11	12:00 p.m.	at Bowling Green	Doyt Perry Stadium; Bowling Green, OH (Battle of I-75)	ESPNU	L 23–28	24,000
October 18	2:00 p.m.	Kent State	Glass Bowl; Toledo, OH	ESPN+	W 45–10	18,417
October 25	3:30 p.m.	at Washington State*	Martin Stadium; Pullman, WA	The CW	L 7–28	27,646
November 5	7:00 p.m.	Northern Illinois	Glass Bowl; Toledo, OH	ESPN2	W 42–3	22,128
November 12	7:00 p.m.	at Miami (OH)	Yager Stadium; Oxford, OH	ESPN2	W 24–3	10,825
November 22	2:00 p.m.	Ball State	Glass Bowl; Toledo, OH	ESPN+	W 38–9	15,127
November 29	12:00 p.m.	at Central Michigan	Kelly/Shorts Stadium; Mount Pleasant, MI	ESPN+	W 21–3	17,012
December 23	2:00 p.m.	vs. Louisville*	Flagler Credit Union Stadium; Boca Raton, FL (Boca Raton Bowl)	ESPN	L 22–27	15,329
*Non-conference game; All times are in Eastern time

== Game summaries ==
=== at Kentucky ===
Toledo Rockets (0–0) at Kentucky Wildcats (0–0) – Game summary

Quarter	1	2	3	4	Total
Rockets	0	2	0	14	16
Wildcats	7	3	0	14	24

at Kroger Field • Lexington, Kentucky

- Date: August 30
- Game time: 12:45 PM EDT
- Game attendance: 56,457
- Referee: Kyle Olson
- TV announcers (SECN): Taylor Zarzour (play-by-play) and Matt Stinchcomb (analyst)

Game information

First quarter

- UK – Zach Calzada 1-yard run (Jacob Kauwe kick), 6:27. Wildcats 7–0. Drive: 7 plays, 29 yards, 3:38.

Second quarter

- TOL – Langston Long Safety, 13:08. Wildcats 7–2.
- UK – Jacob Kauwe 45-yard field goal, 2:04. Wildcats 10–2. Drive: 10 plays, 23 yards, 5:24.

Third quarter

No scoring plays.

Fourth quarter

- UK – Seth McGowan 6-yard run (Jacob Kauwe kick), 12:30. Wildcats 17–2. Drive: 12 plays, 76 yards, 6:27.
- TOL – Tucker Gleason 9-yard run (Dylan Cunanan kick), 9:38. Wildcats 17–9. Drive: 7 plays, 69 yards, 2:45.
- UK – Dante Dowdell 79-yard run (Jacob Kauwe kick), 9:22. Wildcats 24–9. Drive: 1 play, 79 yards, 0:12.
- TOL – Junior Vandeross III 20-yard pass from Tucker Gleason (Dylan Cunanan kick), 1:55. Wildcats 24–16. Drive: 7 plays, 95 yards, 2:28.

Statistics	TOL	UK
First downs	17	17
Plays–yards	69–329	66–305
Rushes–yards	29–59	43–220
Passing yards	270	85
Passing: comp–att–int	23–40–1	10–23–1
Turnovers	1	2
Time of possession	28:19	31:41

Team	Category	Player	Statistics
Toledo	Passing	Tucker Gleason	23/40, 270 yards, TD, INT
Toledo	Rushing	Chip Trayanum	14 carries, 41 yards
Toledo	Receiving	Junior Vandeross III	7 receptions, 88 yards, TD
Kentucky	Passing	Zach Calzada	10/23, 85 yards, INT
Kentucky	Rushing	Dante Dowdell	14 carries, 129 yards, TD
Kentucky	Receiving	Josh Kattus	3 receptions, 43 yards

=== Western Kentucky ===
Western Kentucky Hilltoppers (2–0) at Toledo Rockets (0–1) – Game summary

Quarter	1	2	3	4	Total
Hilltoppers	7	0	0	14	21
Rockets	21	10	14	0	45

at Glass Bowl • Toledo, OH

- Date: Saturday September 6, 2025
- Game time: 6:00 PM CDT
- Game attendance: 24,138
- Referee: Jason Berg
- TV announcers (ESPN+): Michael Reghi (play-by-play) and Je'Rod Cherry (analyst)

Game information

First quarter

- TOL – Chip Trayanum 1-yard run (Dylan Cunanan kick), 12:57. Rockets 7–0. Drive: 3 plays, 34 yards, 1:27.
- TOL – Emmanuel McNeil-Warren 37-yard interception return (Dylan Cunanan kick), 11:52. Rockets 14–0.
- WKU – Matthew Henry 7-yard pass from Maverick McIvor (John Cannon kick), 6:48. Rockets 14–7. Drive: 7 plays, 56 yards, 2:32.
- TOL – Chip Trayanum 10-yard pas from Tucker Gleason (Dylan Cunanan kick), 2:34. Rockets 21–7. Drive: 9 plays, 75 yards, 4:14.[

Second quarter

- TOL – Dylan Cunanan 32-yard field goal, 11:50. Rockets 24–7. Drive: 11 plays, 57 yards, 4:51.
- TOL – Junior Vandeross III 71-yard pass from Tucker Gleason (Dylan Cunanan kick), 1:25. Rockets 31–7. Drive: 2 plays, 87 yards, 0:28.

Third quarter

- TOL – Chip Trayanum 75-yard run (Dylan Cunanan kick), 14:49. Rockets 38–7. Drive: 1 play, 75 yards, 0:11.
- TOL – Connor Jones 5-yard pass from John Alan Richter (Dylan Cunanan kick), 5:30. Rockets 45–7. Drive: 10 plays, 60 yards, 6:32.

Fourth quarter

- WKU – Jaden McGill 1-yard run (John Cannon kick), 13:08. Rockets 45–14. Drive: 6 plays, 52 yards, 2:27.
- WKU – Cameron Flowers II 11-yard pass from Maverick McIvor (John Cannon kick), 6:26. Rockets 45–21. Drive: 8 plays, 59 yards, 4:32.

Statistics	WKU	TOL
First downs	18	21
Plays–yards	67–333	63–508
Rushes–yards	28–59	42–307
Passing yards	274	201
Passing: Comp–Att–Int	24–39–1	12–21–1
Turnovers	2	1
Time of possession	26:35	33:25

Team	Category	Player	Statistics
Western Kentucky	Passing	Maverick McIvor	23/38, 235 yards, 2 TD, INT
Western Kentucky	Rushing	Marvis Parrish	7 carries, 22 yards
Western Kentucky	Receiving	Moussa Barry	3 receptions, 110 yards
Toledo	Passing	Tucker Gleason	7/12, 155 yards, 2 TD
Toledo	Rushing	Chip Trayanum	14 carries, 163 yards, 2 TD
Toledo	Receiving	Junior Vandeross III	5 receptions, 122 yards, TD

=== Morgan State (FCS) ===
Morgan State Bears (FCS) (0–2) at Toledo Rockets (1–1) – Game summary

Quarter	1	2	3	4	Total
Bears (FCS)	0	0	0	0	0
Rockets	3	43	7	7	60

at Glass Bowl • Toledo, OH

- Date: September 13
- Game time: 3:30 PM EDT
- Game weather: Cloudy • Temperature: 73 °F (23 °C) • Wind: SE at 1 mile per hour (1.6 km/h)
- Game attendance: 22,846
- Referee: Billy Williams
- TV announcers (ESPN+): Jim Barber (play-by-play) and Randy Buffington (analyst)

Game information

First Quarter

- (12:37) TOL – Dylan Cunanan 28-yard field goal (Drive: 7 plays, 65 yards, 2:23; Toledo 3–0)

Second Quarter

- (14:08) TOL – Junior Vandeross III 12-yard pass from Tucker Gleason, Connor Jones rush (Drive: 2 plays, 12 yards, 0:37; Toledo 11–0)
- (11:07) TOL – Chip Trayanum 1-yard run, Dylan Cunanan kick (Drive: 5 plays, 20 yards, 2:05; Toledo 18–0)
- (8:19) TOL – Kenji Christian 10-yard run, Dylan Cunanan kick (Drive: 5 plays, 36 yards, 1:22; Toledo 25–0)
- (4:54) TOL – Chip Trayanum 1-yard run, Dylan Cunanan kick (Drive: 4 plays, 42 yards, 1:55; Toledo 32–0)
- (2:18) TOL – Kenji Christian 2-yard run, Dylan Cunanan kick (Drive: 3 plays, 60 yards, 1:04; Toledo 39–0)
- (0:07) TOL – Junior Vandeross III 7-yard pass from John Alan Richter, Dylan Cunanan kick (Drive: 10 plays, 67 yards, 1:16; Toledo 46–0)

Third Quarter

- (7:50) TOL – CC Ezirim 2-yard pass from John Alan Richter, Dylan Cunanan kick (Drive: 11 plays, 74 yards, 4:35; Toledo 53–0)

Fourth Quarter

- (13:48) TOL – Kalieb Osborne 7-yard run, Anthony Ruggles kick (Drive: 11 plays, 80 yards, 5:59; Toledo 60–0)

Statistics	MORG	TOL
First downs	4	31
Plays–yards	48–56	84–557
Rushes–yards	32–36	47–260
Passing yards	20	297
Passing: Comp–Att–Int	9–16–0	27–37–0
Turnovers	1	1
Time of possession	26:01	33:59

Team	Category	Player	Statistics
Morgan State	Passing	Kobe Muasau	6/8, 18 yards
Morgan State	Rushing	Dae'Jeaun Dennis	4 carries, 18 yards
Morgan State	Receiving	Joshua Smith	1 reception, 21 yards
Toledo	Passing	Tucker Gleason	13/17, 174 yards, TD
Toledo	Rushing	Kalieb Osborne	7 carries, 49 yards, TD
Toledo	Receiving	Javon Brown	5 receptions, 94 yards

=== at Western Michigan ===
Toledo Rockets (2–1) at Western Michigan Broncos (0–3) – Game summary

Quarter	1	2	3	4	Total
Rockets	0	3	10	0	13
Broncos	0	0	6	8	14

at Waldo Stadium • Kalamazoo, MI

- Date: September 20
- Game time: 3:30 p.m. EDT
- Game weather: Cloudy • Temperature: 80 °F (27 °C) • Wind: SE at 6 miles per hour (9.7 km/h)
- Game attendance: 20,744
- Referee: Marcel Kerr
- TV announcers (ESPN+): Ted Emrich (play-by-play) and Marcus Ray (analyst)

Game information

First quarter

- No scoring plays.

Second quarter

- (0:22) TOL – Dylan Cunanan 30-yard field goal (Drive: 4 plays, 1 yard, 0:38; Toledo 3-0)

Third quarter

- (14:28) TOL – Chip Trayanum 63-yard run, Dylan Cunanan kick (Drive: 2 plays, 75 yards, 0:32; Toledo 10-0)
- (7:43) TOL – Dylan Cunanan 27-yard field goal (Drive: 6 plays, 16 yards, 2:37; Toledo 13-0)
- (0:48) WMU – Broc Lowry 6-yard run, Palmer Domschke PAT failed (Drive: 7 plays, 90 yards, 3:47; Toledo 13-6)

Fourth quarter

- (0:52) WMU – Broc Lowry 2-yard run, Broc Lowry run for two-point conversion (Drive: 6 plays, 48 yards, 0:48; Western Michigan 14-13)

Statistics	TOL	WMU
First downs	16	17
Plays–yards	72–280	70–291
Rushes–yards	42–191	37–90
Passing yards	89	201
Passing: Comp–Att–Int	15–30–2	16–33–1
Turnovers	2	3
Time of possession	29:42	30:18

Team	Category	Player	Statistics
Toledo	Passing	Tucker Gleason	15/30, 89 yards, 2 INT
Toledo	Rushing	Chip Trayanum	26 carries, 153 yards, TD
Toledo	Receiving	Terrell Crosby Jr.	3 receptions, 34 yards
Western Michigan	Passing	Broc Lowry	16/33, 201 yards, INT
Western Michigan	Rushing	Broc Lowry	18 carries, 50 yards, 2 TD
Western Michigan	Receiving	Talique Williams	4 receptions, 112 yards

=== Akron ===
Akron Zips (1–3) at Toledo Rockets (2–2) – Game summary

Quarter	1	2	3	4	Total
Zips	0	3	0	0	3
Rockets	14	21	3	7	45

at Glass Bowl • Toledo, OH

- Date: September 27
- Game time: 3:30 p.m. EDT
- Game weather: Sunny, 84 degrees
- Game attendance: 24,535
- Referee: Rick Warne
- TV announcers (ESPN+): Michael Reghi (play-by-play) and Ryan Cavanaugh (analyst)

Game information

First quarter

- TOL – Junior Vandeross III 28-yard pass from Tucker Gleason (Dylan Cunanan kick), 14:44. Rockets 7–0. Drive: 1 play, 28 yards, 0:07.
- TOL – Chip Trayanum 11-yard run (Dylan Cunanan kick), 9:59. Rockets 14–0. Drive: 7 plays, 76 yards, 3:33.

Second quarter

- TOL – Tucker Gleason 2-yard run (Dylan Cunanan kick), 13:41. Rockets 21–0. Drive: 10 plays, 75 yards, 5:01.
- TOL – Junior Vandeross III 26-yard pass from Tucker Gleason (Dylan Cunanan kick), 10:27. Rockets 28–0. Drive: 3 plays, 50 yards, 1:18.
- AKR – Owen Wiley 39-yard field goal, 1:56. Rockets 28–3. Drive: 18 plays, 54 yards, 8:31.
- TOL – Eric Holley III 26-yard pass from Tucker Gleason (Dylan Cunanan kick), 0:23. Rockets 35–3. Drive: 4 plays, 72 yards, 1:29.

Third quarter

- TOL – Dylan Cunanan 40-yard field goal, 0:12. Rockets 38–3. Drive: 5 plays, 42 yards, 2:06.

Fourth quarter

- TOL – Kalieb Osborne 21-yard run (Dylan Cunanan kick), 12:48. Rockets 45–3. Drive: 4 plays, 45 yards, 1:55.

Statistics	AKR	TOL
First downs	11	28
Plays–yards	60–134	57–538
Rushes–yards	35–55	37–245
Passing yards	79	293
Passing: Comp–Att–Int	14–25–0	20–24–0
Turnovers	1	0
Time of possession	28:53	31:07

Team	Category	Player	Statistics
Akron	Passing	Brayden Roggow	7/12, 51 yards
Akron	Rushing	Jordan Gant	13 carries, 22 yards
Akron	Receiving	Israel Polk	2 receptions, 16 yards
Toledo	Passing	Tucker Gleason	16/19, 237 yards, 3 TD
Toledo	Rushing	Chip Trayanum	11 carries, 75 yards, TD
Toledo	Receiving	Junior Vandeross III	9 receptions, 122 yards, 2 TD

=== at Bowling Green (Battle of I-75) ===
Toledo Rockets (3–2) at Bowling Green Falcons (2–3) – Game summary

Quarter	1	2	3	4	Total
Rockets	14	7	0	2	23
Falcons	0	7	7	14	28

at Doyt Perry Stadium • Bowling Green, OH

- Date: October 11
- Game time: 12:00 p.m. EDT
- Game weather: Sunny • Temperature: 68 °F (20 °C) • Wind: N at 7 miles per hour (11 km/h)
- Game attendance: 24,000
- Referee: Marcel Kerr
- TV announcers (ESPNU): Matt Schumacker (play-by-play) and Dustin Fox (analyst)

Game information

First quarter

- (12:03) TOL – Chip Trayanum 14-yard run, Dylan Cunanan kick (Drive: 6 plays, 75 yards, 2:57; Toledo 7–0)
- (3:39) TOL – Tucker Gleason 12-yard run, Dylan Cunanan kick (Drive: 7 plays, 67 yards, 3:05; Toledo 14–0)

Second quarter

- (1:29) TOL – Jacob Petersen 17-yard pass from Tucker Gleason, Dylan Cunanan kick (Drive: 5 plays, 43 yards, 1:55; Toledo 21–0)
- (0:13) BGSU – Cameron Pettaway 45-yard pass from Lucian Anderson III, Jackson Kleather kick (Drive: 5 plays, 70 yards, 1:13; Toledo 21–7)

Third quarter

- (1:52) BGSU – Jacob Harris 8-yard pass from Lucian Anderson III, Jackson Kleather kick (Drive: 7 plays, 51 yards, 3:20; Toledo 21–14)

Fourth quarter

- (7:03) BGSU – Cameron Pettaway 73-yard pass from RJ Garcia II, Jackson Kleather kick (Drive: 2 plays, 71 yards, 0:49; Tied 21–21)
- (6:07) BGSU – Chris McMillian 1-yard run, Jackson Kleather kick (Drive: 1 play, 1 yard, 0:06; Bowling Green 28–21)
- (0:00) TOL – 0-yard safety (Bowling Green 28–23)

Statistics	TOL	BGSU
First downs	23	10
Plays–yards	73–429	53–226
Rushes–yards	43–165	36–61
Passing yards	264	165
Passing: Comp–Att–Int	19–30–1	10–17–1
Turnovers	2	1
Time of possession	31:50	25:52

Team	Category	Player	Statistics
Toledo	Passing	Tucker Gleason	19/30, 264 yards, TD, INT
Toledo	Rushing	Chip Trayanum	27 carries, 125 yards, TD
Toledo	Receiving	Junior Vandeross III	6 receptions, 100 yards
Bowling Green	Passing	Lucian Anderson III	9/16, 92 yards, 2 TD, INT
Bowling Green	Rushing	Lucian Anderson III	10 carries, 32 yards
Bowling Green	Receiving	Cameron Pettaway	2 receptions, 118 yards, 2 TD

=== Kent State ===
Kent State Golden Flashes (2–4) at Toledo Rockets (3–3) – Game summary

Quarter	1	2	3	4	Total
Golden Flashes	10	0	0	0	10
Rockets	7	10	21	7	45

at Glass Bowl • Toledo, OH

- Date: October 18
- Game time: 2:00 p.m. EDT
- Game weather: Sunny • Temperature: 81 °F (27 °C) • Wind: SW at 11 miles per hour (18 km/h)
- Game attendance: 18,417
- Referee: Chris La Mange
- TV announcers (ESPN+): Shawn Kenney (play-by-play) and Ryan Cavanaugh (analyst)

Game information

First quarter

- (14:50) KENT – Cade Wolford 75-yard pass from Dru DeShields, Will Hryszko kick (Drive: 1 play, 75 yards, 0:10; KENT 7–0)
- (7:33) KENT – Will Hryszko 38-yard field goal (Drive: 11 plays, 45 yards, 5:51; KENT 10–0)
- (1:18) TOL – Trayvon Rudolph 58-yard pass from Tucker Gleason, Dylan Cunanan kick (Drive: 4 plays, 89 yards, 1:19; KENT 10–7)

Second quarter

- (12:31) TOL – Dylan Cunanan 28-yard field goal (Drive: 8 plays, 67 plays, 2:35; Tied 10–10)
- (0:32) TOL – Ryder Treadway 11-yard pass from Tucker GLeason, Dylan Cunanan kick (Drive: 11 plays, 81 yards, 3:34; TOL 17–10)

Third quarter

- (9:24) TOL – Junior Vandeross III 21-yard pass from Tucker Gleason, Dylan Cunanan kick (Drive: 4 plays, 51 yards, 1:18; TOL 24–10)
- (6:04) TOL – Javon Brown 16-yard pass from Tucker Gleason, Dylan Cunanan kick (Drive: 4 plays, 57 yards, 1:54; TOL 31–10)

Fourth quarter

- (10:00) TOL – Terrell Crosby Jr. 18-yard pass from Kalieb Osborne, Dylan Cunanan kick (Drive: 11 plays, 75 yards, 5:11; TOL 45–10)

Statistics	KENT	TOL
First downs	9	29
Plays–yards	50–224	72–552
Rushes–yards	26–65	40–178
Passing yards	159	374
Passing: Comp–Att–Int	12–24–1	25–32–0
Turnovers	1	0
Time of possession	26:12	33:48

Team	Category	Player	Statistics
Kent State	Passing	Dru DeShields	12/23, 159 yards, TD, INT
Kent State	Rushing	Jordan Nubin	13 carries, 61 yards
Kent State	Receiving	Cade Wolford	3 receptions, 87 yards, TD
Toledo	Passing	Tucker Gleason	21/28, 294 yards, 4 TD
Toledo	Rushing	Kenji Christian	16 carries, 113 yards
Toledo	Receiving	Trayvon Rudolph	5 receptions, 119 yards, TD

=== at Washington State ===
Toledo Rockets (4–3) at Washington State Cougars (3–4) – Game summary

Quarter	1	2	3	4	Total
Rockets	0	7	0	0	7
Cougars	0	21	0	7	28

at Martin Stadium • Pullman, WA

- Date: October 25
- Game time: 12:30 PM PDT
- Game weather: Cloudy • Temperature: 55 °F (13 °C)
- Game attendance: 27,646
- Referee: Matt Packowski
- TV announcers (The CW): Ted Robinson (play-by-play), Ryan Leaf (analyst) and Nigel Burton (sideline)

Game information

First quarter

- No scoring plays.

Second quarter

- WSU - Zevi Eckhaus 7-yard run (Jack Stevens kick), 12:07. Cougars 7-0, Drive: 11 plays, 89 yards, 6:42.
- WSU - Tony Freeman 15-yard pass from Zevi Eckhaus (Jack Stevens kick), 4:00. Cougars 14-0, Drive: 11 plays, 80 yards, 5:33.
- WSU -Carter Pabst 35-yard pass from Zevi Eckhaus (Jack Stevens kick), 0:51. Cougars 21-0, Drive: 8 plays, 83 yards, 1:16.
- TOL - Junior Vandeross III 24-yard pass from Tucker Gleason (Dylan Cunanan kick), 0:13. Cougars 21-7, Drive: 6 plays, 65 yards, 0:38.

Third quarter

- No scoring plays.

Fourth quarter

- WSU - Kirby Vorhees 6-yard run (Jack Stevens kick), 2:21. Cougars 28-7, Drive: 12 plays, 65 yards, 6:34.

Statistics	TOL	WSU
First downs	15	20
Plays–yards	66–299	66–321
Rushes–yards	24–61	44–162
Passing yards	238	159
Passing: comp–att–int	26–42–1	10–22–2
Turnovers	1	2
Time of possession	27:27	32:33

Team	Category	Player	Statistics
Toledo	Passing	Tucker Gleason	26/41, 238 yards, TD, INT
Toledo	Rushing	Kenji Christian	11 carries, 33 yards
Toledo	Receiving	Jacob Peterson	5 receptions, 58 yards
Washington State	Passing	Zevi Eckhaus	10/22, 159 yards, 2 TD, 2 INT
Washington State	Rushing	Zevi Eckhaus	15 carries, 74 yards, TD
Washington State	Receiving	Joshua Meredith	4 receptions, 81 yards

=== Northern Illinois ===
Northern Illinois Huskies (2-6) at Toledo Rockets (4-4) – Game summary

Quarter	1	2	3	4	Total
Huskies	3	0	0	0	3
Rockets	7	21	7	7	42

at Glass Bowl • Toledo, OH

- Date: November 5
- Game time: 7:00 p.m. EDT
- Game weather: Cloudy • Temperature: 52 °F (11 °C) • Wind: NW at 12 miles per hour (19 km/h)
- Game attendance: 22,128
- Referee: Jeremy Valentine
- TV announcers (ESPN2): Jay Alter (play-by-play) and Rocky Boiman (analyst)

Game information

First quarter

- (14:45) TOL – Trayvon Rudolph 96-yard kickoff return, Dylan Cunanan kick (Toledo 7–0)
- (9:25) NIU – Andrew Glass 50-yard field goal (Drive: 12 plays, 42 yards, 5:21; Toledo 7–3)

Second quarter

- (11:01) TOL – Tucker Gleason 2-yard run, Dylan Cunanan kick (Drive: 7 plays, 44 yards, 3:44; Toledo 14–3)
- (5:08) TOL – Chip Trayanum 5-yard run, Dylan Cunanan kick (Drive: 9 plays, 68 yards, 4:23; Toledo 21–3)
- (0:51) TOL – Junior Vandeross III 19-yard pass from Tucker Gleason, Dylan Cunanan kick (Drive: 8 plays, 92 yards, 1:03; Toledo 28–3)

Third quarter

- (4:53) TOL – Kenji Christian 10-yard run, Dylan Cunanan kick (Drive: 8 plays, 63 yards, 3:38; Toledo 35–3)

Fourth quarter

- (13:43) TOL – Kenji Christian 16-yard pass from Tucker Gleason, Dylan Cunanan kick (Drive: 7 plays, 61 yards, 4:28; Toledo 42–3)

Statistics	NIU	TOL
First downs	13	23
Plays–yards	65–203	62–443
Rushes–yards	36–62	29–134
Passing yards	141	309
Passing: Comp–Att–Int	11–29–0	25–33–0
Turnovers	0	0
Time of possession	29:42	30:18

Team	Category	Player	Statistics
Northern Illinois	Passing	Josh Holst	5/13, 87 yards
Northern Illinois	Rushing	Chavon Wright	11 carries, 21 yards
Northern Illinois	Receiving	Rickey Taylor Jr.	3 receptions, 69 yards
Toledo	Passing	Tucker Gleason	25/31, 309 yards, 2 TD
Toledo	Rushing	Chip Trayanum	11 carries, 36 yards, TD
Toledo	Receiving	Junior Vandeross III	6 receptions, 97 yards, TD

=== at Miami (OH) ===
Toledo Rockets (5–4) at Miami RedHawks (5–4) – Game summary

Quarter	1	2	3	4	Total
Rockets	0	14	10	0	24
RedHawks	0	0	3	0	3

at Yager Stadium • Oxford, OH

- Date: November 12
- Game time: 7:00 PM EST
- Game weather: Sunny • Wind: E at 15 miles per hour (24 km/h)
- Game attendance: 10,825
- Referee: Andrew Speciale
- TV announcers (ESPN2): Jay Alter (play-by-play) and Rocky Boiman (analyst)

Game information

First quarter

- No scoring plays.

Second quarter

- (5:59) TOL – Chip Trayanum 3-yard run, Dylan Cunanan kick (Drive: 9 plays, 46 yards, 3:21; Toledo 7–0)
- (0:18) TOL – Jacob Petersen 6-yard pass from Tucker Gleason, Dylan Cunanan kick (Drive: 1 play, 6 yards, 0:00; Toledo 14–0)

Third quarter

- (11:31) TOL – Ryder Treadway 24-yard pass from Tucker Gleason, Dylan Cunanan kick (Drive: 7 plays, 79 yards, 3:17; Toledo 21–0)
- (8:31) TOL – Dylan Cunanan 36-yard field goal (Drive: 4 plays, 7 yards, 2:01; Toledo 24–0)
- (1:45) M-OH – Dom Dzioban 26-yard field goal (Drive: 14 plays, 61 yards, 6:40; Toledo 24–3)

Fourth quarter

- No scoring plays.

Statistics	TOL	M-OH
First downs	15	15
Plays–yards	63–312	70–222
Rushes–yards	32–143	32–75
Passing yards	169	147
Passing: Comp–Att–Int	18–31–2	11–38–3
Turnovers	3	3
Time of possession	30:09	29:51

Team	Category	Player	Statistics
Toledo	Passing	Tucker Gleason	18/31, 169 yards, 2 TD, 2 INT
Toledo	Rushing	Chip Trayanum	21 carries, 91 yards, TD
Toledo	Receiving	Ryder Treadway	4 receptions, 55 yards, TD
Miami (OH)	Passing	Henry Hesson	11/38, 147 yards, 3 INT
Miami (OH)	Rushing	Jordan Brunson	9 carries, 44 yards
Miami (OH)	Receiving	Kam Perry	4 receptions, 69 yards

=== Ball State ===
Ball State Cardinals (4–6) at Toledo Rockets (6–4) – Game summary

Quarter	1	2	3	4	Total
Cardinals	0	3	0	6	9
Rockets	14	10	7	7	38

at Glass Bowl • Toledo, OH

- Date: November 22
- Game time: 2:00 p.m. EDT
- Game attendance: 15,127
- Referee: Chris LaMange
- TV announcers (ESPN+): Kelsie Kasper (play-by-play) and Marcus Ray (analyst)

Game information

First quarter

- TOL – Trayvon Rudolph 14-yard pass from Tucker Gleason (Dylan Cunanan kick), 10:46. Rockets 7–0. Drive: 2 plays, 17 yards, 0:35.
- TOL – Ryder Treadway 24-yard pass from Tucker Gleason (Dylan Cunanan kick), 7:51. Rockets 14–0. Drive: 4 plays, 52 yards, 1:09.

Second quarter

- BALL – DC Pippin 47-yard field goal, 3:26. Rockets 14–3. Drive: 9 plays, 53 yards, 4:21.
- TOL – Chip Trayanum 2-yard run (Dylan Cunanan kick), 1:53. Rockets 21–3. Drive: 5 plays, 73 yards, 1:29.
- TOL – Dylan Cunanan 46-yard field goal, 0:00. Rockets 24–3. Drive: 5 plays, 22 yards, 0:21.

Third quarter

- TOL – Junior Vandeross III 42-yard pass from Tucker Gleason (Dylan Cunanan kick), 10:18. Rockets 31–3. Drive: 3 plays, 65 yards, 1:02.

Fourth quarter

- TOL – Junior Vandeross III 63-yard pass from Tucker Gleason (Dylan Cunanan kick), 12:05. Rockets 38–3. Drive: 6 plays, 84 yards, 2:42.
- BALL – Isaiah Thacker 15-yard pass from Kiael Kelly (DC Pippin kick failed), 3:43. Rockets 38–9. Drive: 10 plays, 91 yards, 4:50.

Statistics	BALL	TOL
First downs	18	19
Plays–yards	79–335	57–404
Rushes–yards	46–106	30–186
Passing yards	229	218
Passing: Comp–Att–Int	15–33–2	15–27–2
Turnovers	3	2
Time of possession	37:04	22:56

Team	Category	Player	Statistics
Ball State	Passing	Kiael Kelly	14/31, 189 yards, TD, 2 INT
Ball State	Rushing	Jalen Bonds	16 carries, 58 yards
Ball State	Receiving	Jalen Bonds	1 reception, 54 yards
Toledo	Passing	Tucker Gleason	15/24, 218 yards, 4 TD, 2 INT
Toledo	Rushing	Chip Trayanum	15 carries, 128 yards, TD
Toledo	Receiving	Junior Vandeross III	7 receptions, 127 yards, 2 TD

=== at Central Michigan ===
Toledo Rockets (7–4) at Central Michigan Chippewas (7–4) – Game summary

Quarter	1	2	3	4	Total
Rockets	0	0	7	14	21
Chippewas	0	3	0	0	3

at Kelly/Shorts Stadium • Mount Pleasant, MI

- Date: November 29
- Game time: 12:00 p.m. EST
- Game attendance: 6,673
- Referee: Rick Warne
- TV announcers (ESPN+): Michael Reghi (play-by-play) and Je'Rod Cherry (analyst)

Game information

First quarter

- No scoring plays.

Second quarter

- CMU – Cade Graham 28-yard field goal, 0:38. Chippewas 3–0. Drive: 12 plays, 87 yards, 5:42.

Third quarter

- TOL – Chip Trayanum 57-yard pass from Kalieb Osborne (Dylan Cunanan kick), 0:10. Rockets 7–3. Drive: 5 plays, 69 yards, 1:50.

Fourth quarter

- TOL – Kenji Christian 9-yard run (Dylan Cunanan kick), 8:41. Rockets 14–3. Drive: 6 plays, 57 yards, 3:20.
- TOL – Chip Trayanum 42-yard run (Dylan Cunanan kick), 1:49. Rockets 21–3. Drive: 1 play, 42 yards, 0:07.

Statistics	TOL	CMU
First downs	18	15
Plays–yards	61–411	66–323
Rushes–yards	37–205	36–81
Passing yards	206	242
Passing: Comp–Att–Int	14-24-0	19-30-1
Turnovers	1	1
Time of possession	28:34	31:26

Team	Category	Player	Statistics
Toledo	Passing	Kalieb Osborne	5/7, 108 yards, TD
Toledo	Rushing	Chip Trayanum	16 carries, 94 yards, TD
Toledo	Receiving	Junior Vandeross III	4 receptions, 71 yards
Central Michigan	Passing	Joe Labas	19/30, 242 yards, INT
Central Michigan	Rushing	Brock Townsend	14 carries, 68 yards
Central Michigan	Receiving	Tommy McIntosh	6 receptions, 83 yards

=== vs. Louisville (Boca Raton Bowl) ===
2025 Bush's Boca Raton Bowl
Louisville Cardinals (8–4) vs. Toledo Rockets (8–4) – Game summary

Quarter	1	2	3	4	Total
Rockets	3	0	0	19	22
Cardinals	7	0	7	13	27

at Flagler Credit Union Stadium • Boca Raton, FL

- Date: December 23
- Game time: 2:00 p.m. EST
- Game weather: Clear • Temperature: 77 °F (25 °C)
- Game attendance: 15,329
- Referee: Charles Lamertina
- TV announcers (ESPN): Jay Alter (play-by-play), Rocky Boiman (analyst) and Ashley Stroehlein (sideline)

Game information

First quarter

- (10:26) LOU – TreyShun Hurry 17-yard pass from Miller Moss (Cooper Ranvier kick) (Drive: 8 plays, 75 yards, 4:34; Louisville 7–0)
- (0:11) TOL – Robert Hammond III 41-yard field goal (Drive: 10 plays, 34 yards, 4:55; Louisville 7–3)

Second quarter

- No scoring plays

Third quarter

- (3:40) LOU – Antonio Meeks 5-yard pass from Miller Moss (Cooper Ranvier kick) (Drive: 9 plays, 77 yards, 4:55; Louisville 14–3)

Fourth quarter

- (14:53) LOU – Isaac Brown 11-yard run (Cooper Ranvier kick) (Drive: 2 plays, 15 yards, 0:41; Louisville 21–3)
- (10:42) TOL – Jacob Petersen 26-yard pass from Kalieb Osborne (Chip Trayanum run) (Drive: 10 plays, 74 yards, 4:11; Louisville 21–11)
- (6:35) TOL – Robert Hammond III 50-yard field goal (Drive: 6 plays, 18 yards, 2:21; Louisville 21–14)
- (5:03) LOU – Isaac Brown 53-yard run (Avery Smith defensive PAT conversion) (Drive: 3 plays, 75 yards, 1:32; Louisville 27–16)
- (2:22) TOL – Chip Trayanum 3-yard run (Two-point conversion failed) (Drive: 6 plays, 68 yards, 2:24; Louisville 27–22)

Statistics	TOL	LOU
First downs	20	23
Plays–yards	68–336	60–333
Rushes–yards	40–169	36–180
Passing yards	167	153
Passing: comp–att–int	17–28–0	16–24–0
Turnovers	1	1
Time of possession	31:46	28:14

Team	Category	Player	Statistics
Toledo	Passing	Kalieb Osborne	17/28, 167 yards, TD
Toledo	Rushing	Kalieb Osborne	18 carries, 77 yards
Toledo	Receiving	Junior Vandeross III	7 receptions, 61 yards
Louisville	Passing	Miller Moss	16/24, 153 yards, 2 TD
Louisville	Rushing	Keyjuan Brown	15 carries, 112 yards
Louisville	Receiving	Caullin Lacy	6 receptions, 88 yards
