= 2025 Boca Raton Bowl =

Postseason college football bowl game

2025 Bush's Boca Raton Bowl of Beans
- 12th Boca Raton Bowl
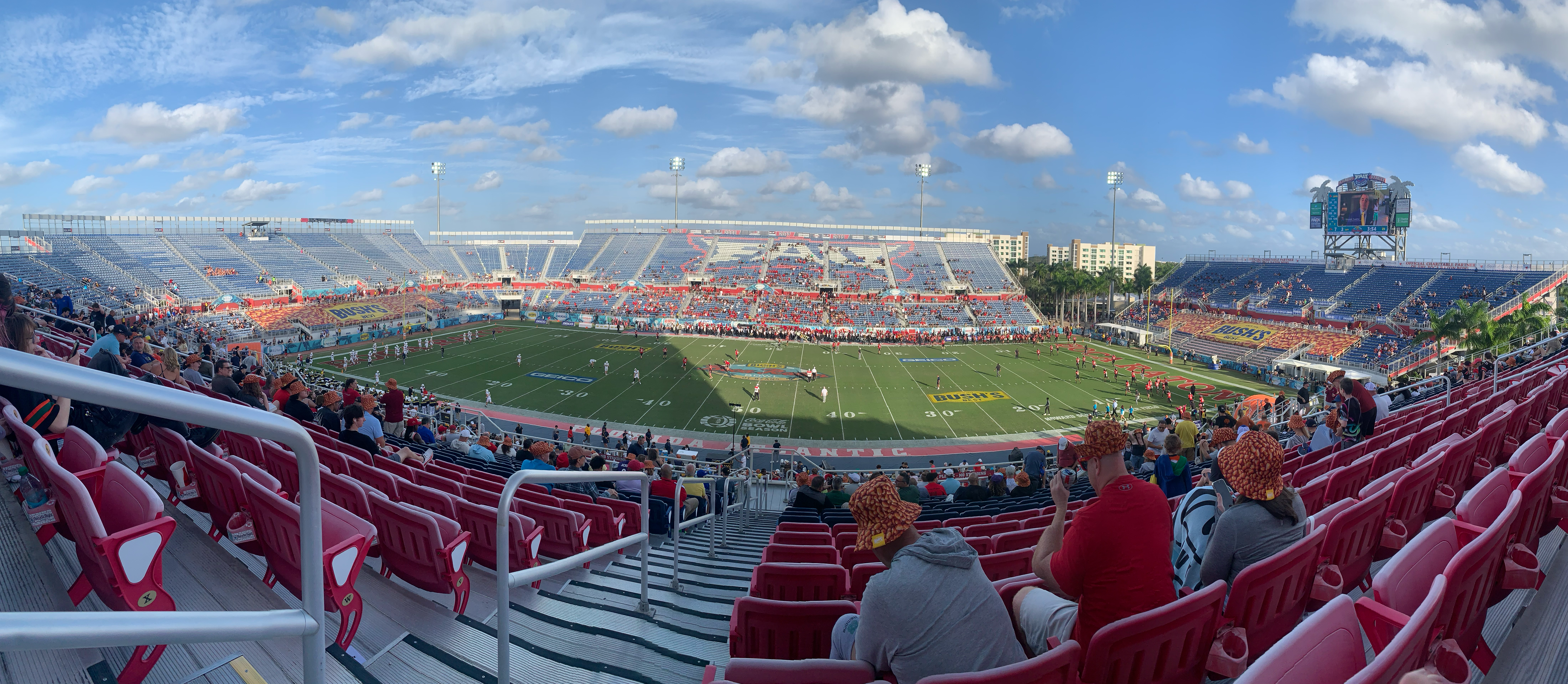
- Panoramic photograph of the bowl mid-game
Toledo Rockets	Louisville Cardinals
(8–4)	(8–4)
MAC	ACC
22	27
Head coach: Robert Weiner (interim)	Head coach: Jeff Brohm
	1	2	3	4	Total
Toledo	3	0	0	19	22
Louisville	7	0	7	13	27
- Date: December 23, 2025
- Season: 2025
- Stadium: Flagler Credit Union Stadium
- Location: Boca Raton, Florida
- MVP: Miller Moss (QB, Louisville)
- Favorite: Louisville by 7
- Referee: Charles Lamertina (American)
- Attendance: 15,329

United States TV coverage
- Network: ESPN; ESPN Radio
- Announcers: Jay Alter (play-by-play), Rocky Boiman (analyst), and Ashley Stroehlein (sideline) (ESPN); Chris Carlin (play-by-play), Freddie Coleman (analyst), and Evan Cohen (sideline) (ESPN Radio)

International TV coverage
- Network: ESPN Brazil
- Announcers: Fernando Nardini (play-by-play) and Deivis Chiodini (analyst)

The 2025 Boca Raton Bowl was a college football bowl game played on December 23, 2025, at Flagler Credit Union Stadium in Boca Raton, Florida. The 12th annual Boca Raton Bowl began at approximately 2:00 p.m. EST and aired on ESPN. It was one of the 2025–26 bowl games concluding the 2025 FBS football season. Sponsored by Bush Brothers and Company, makers of Bush's Best baked beans, the game was officially known as the Bush's Boca Raton Bowl of Beans.

The game featured the Toledo Rockets (8–4) from the Mid-American Conference (MAC) and the Louisville Cardinals (8–4) from the Atlantic Coast Conference (ACC). Louisville beat Toledo, 27–22.

== Teams ==
The game featured the Louisville Cardinals of the ACC and Toledo Rockets of the MAC. This was Louisville's first appearance and Toledo's third in the Boca Raton Bowl. This was the ninth meeting between the programs. The teams first played in 1925, and most recently in 1981; entering the bowl, Louisville held a 5–3 lead in the series.

=== Louisville Cardinals ===
Louisville began their season with seven wins in their first eight games, losing only to Virginia. The Cardinals then lost three of their final four games, and entered the Boca Raton Bowl with an 8–4 record.

=== Toledo Rockets ===
Toledo held a 4–4 record at the end of October, then finished the regular season with four consecutive wins to enter the Boca Raton Bowl with an 8–4 record. The Rockets were led in their bowl game by interim head coach Robert Weiner, named to the role in early December after Jason Candle left the program to become head coach at UConn.

== Game summary ==
2025 Boca Raton Bowl

Quarter	1	2	3	4	Total
Toledo	3	0	0	19	22
Louisville	7	0	7	13	27

at Flagler Credit Union Stadium • Boca Raton, Florida

- Date: December 23, 2025
- Game time: 2:00 p.m. EST
- Game weather: Clear • Temperature: 77 °F (25 °C)
- Game attendance: 15,329
- Referee: Charles Lamertina
- TV announcers (ESPN): Jay Alter (play-by-play), Rocky Boiman (analyst), and Ashley Stroehlein (sideline)
- Box score

Game information

First quarter

- (10:26) LOU – TreyShun Hurry 17-yard pass from Miller Moss (Cooper Ranvier kick) (Drive: 8 plays, 75 yards, 4:34; Louisville 7–0)
- (0:11) TOL – Robert Hammond III 41-yard field goal (Drive: 10 plays, 34 yards, 4:55; Louisville 7–3)

Second quarter

- No scoring plays

Third quarter

- (3:40) LOU – Antonio Meeks 5-yard pass from Miller Moss (Cooper Ranvier kick) (Drive: 9 plays, 77 yards, 4:55; Louisville 14–3)

Fourth quarter

- (14:53) LOU – Isaac Brown 11-yard run (Cooper Ranvier kick) (Drive: 2 plays, 15 yards, 0:41; Louisville 21–3)
- (10:42) TOL – Jacob Petersen 26-yard pass from Kalieb Osborne (Chip Trayanum run) (Drive: 10 plays, 74 yards, 4:11; Louisville 21–11)
- (6:35) TOL – Robert Hammond III 50-yard field goal (Drive: 6 plays, 18 yards, 2:21; Louisville 21–14)
- (5:03) LOU – Isaac Brown 53-yard run (Avery Smith defensive PAT conversion) (Drive: 3 plays, 75 yards, 1:32; Louisville 27–16)
- (2:22) TOL – Chip Trayanum 3-yard run (Two-point conversion failed) (Drive: 6 plays, 68 yards, 2:24; Louisville 27–22)

=== Statistics ===
Statistics	TOL	LOU
First downs	20	23
Plays–yards	336	333
Rushes–yards	40–169	36–180
Passing yards	167	153
Passing: comp–att–int	17–28–0	16–24–0
Turnovers		
Time of possession	31:46	28:14

Team	Category	Player	Statistics
Toledo	Passing	Kalieb Osborne	17–28, 167 yards, TD
Toledo	Rushing	Kalieb Osborne	18 carries, 77 yards
Toledo	Receiving	Junior Vandeross III	7 receptions, 61 yards
Louisville	Passing	Miller Moss	16–24, 153 yards, 2 TD
Louisville	Rushing	Keyjuan Brown	15 carries, 112 yards
Louisville	Receiving	Caullin Lacy	6 receptions, 88 yards
