= 2025 Louisville Cardinals football team =

American college football season

2025 Louisville Cardinals football

Boca Raton Bowl champion

Boca Raton Bowl, W 27–22 vs. Toledo
- Conference: Atlantic Coast Conference
- Record: 9–4 (4–4 ACC)
- Head coach: Jeff Brohm (3rd season)
- Offensive coordinator: Brian Brohm (3rd season)
- Offensive scheme: Spread
- Co-defensive coordinators: Ron English (4th season); Mark Hagen (3rd season)
- Base defense: 4–2–5 or 4–3
- Home stadium: L&N Federal Credit Union Stadium

Uniform
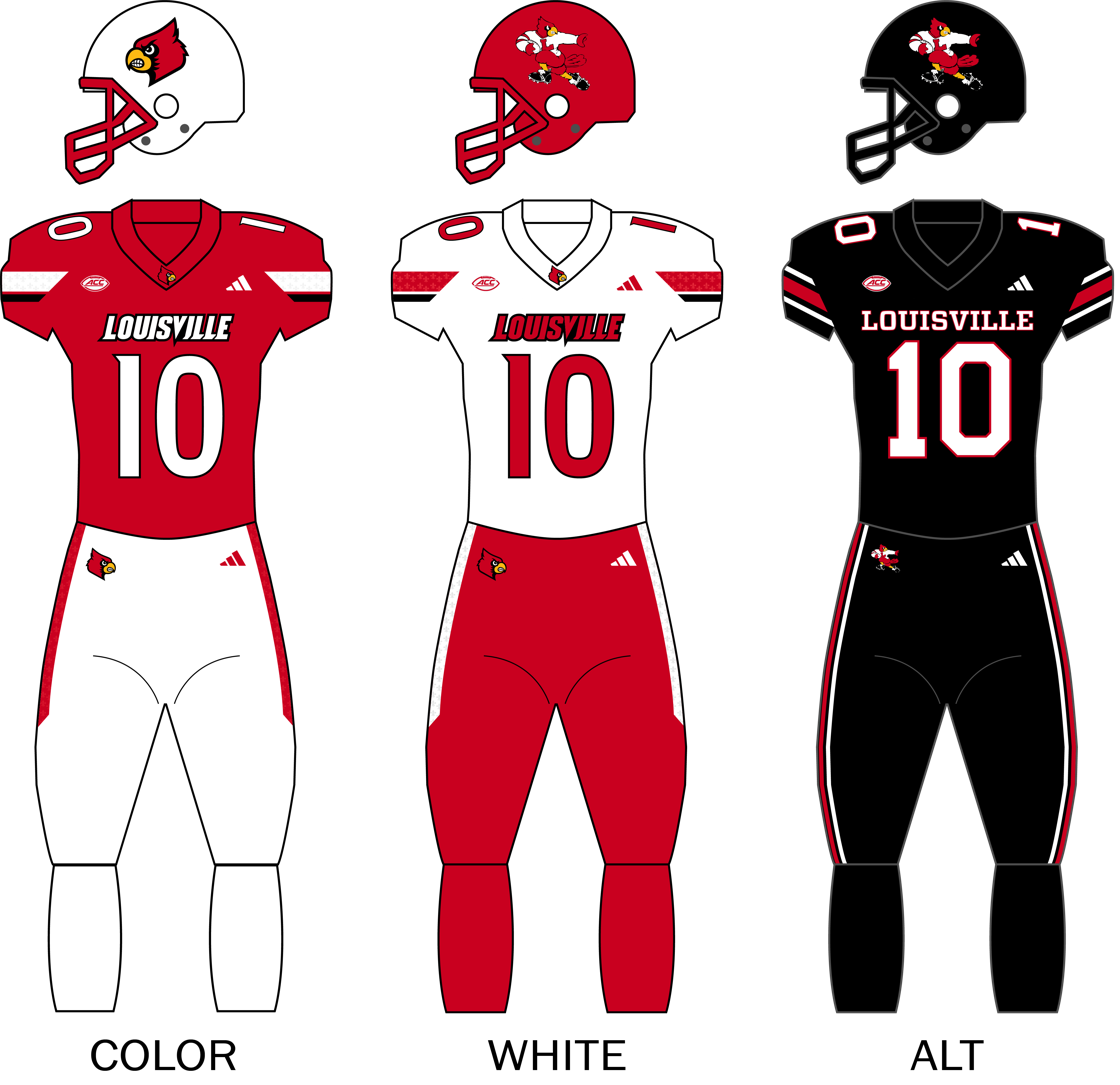

2025 Atlantic Coast Conference football standings
	Conf.			Overall
Team	W		L	W		L
No. 16 Virginia y	7	–	1	11	–	3
Duke y$	6	–	2	9	–	5
No. 2 Miami (FL) ^	6	–	2	13	–	3
Georgia Tech	6	–	2	9	–	4
SMU	6	–	2	9	–	4
Pittsburgh	6	–	2	8	–	5
Louisville	4	–	4	9	–	4
Wake Forest	4	–	4	9	–	4
NC State	4	–	4	8	–	5
California	4	–	4	7	–	6
Clemson	4	–	4	7	–	6
Stanford	3	–	5	4	–	8
Florida State	2	–	6	5	–	7
Virginia Tech	2	–	6	3	–	9
North Carolina	2	–	6	4	–	8
Boston College	1	–	7	2	–	10
Syracuse	1	–	7	3	–	9
Championship: Duke 27, Virginia 20^{OT}
^ – College Football Playoff participant; $ – Conference champion; y – Championship game participant; As of October 13, 2026; Rankings from AP Poll

The 2025 Louisville Cardinals football team represented the University of Louisville as a member of the Atlantic Coast Conference (ACC) during the 2025 NCAA Division I FBS football season. The Cardinals were led by third-year head coach Jeff Brohm and played home games at the L&N Federal Credit Union Stadium located in Louisville, Kentucky.

The Cardinals began the season 4–0 for the first time since 2023. The win streak was capped by a comeback win over Pittsburgh where the Cards went down by 17, tied the game up, and then fell back down by 10. Louisville outscored Pitt 17–0 in the second half.

Louisville fell to 4–1 after an overtime loss to Virginia 30–27. The Louisville defense held the Virginia offense to 10 points in regulation, but gave up two touchdowns on offense from a pick-6 and a scoop-and-score. This was Louisville's first overtime game since a win over Cincinnati in 2013.

Unranked Louisville went on the road and upset undefeated #2 Miami, snapping a 10-game home winning streak and giving the Canes their first home loss since Louisville beat them in 2023. Louisville's defense held Miami to 63 rushing yards and forced 4 interceptions from Carson Beck, including a game sealing pick in the final minute by T.J. Capers. Chris Bell finished with 136 yards and 2 touchdowns. The Cards won their first ever road game over a top 5 opponent.

After starting the season 7–1, Louisville lost 3 straight to Cal, Clemson, and at SMU. The Cards limped into their final game against rival Kentucky with multiple players out including WR Chris Bell and RBs Isaac Brown, Duke Watson, and Keyjuan Brown. Despite being shorthanded, the Cards dominated the Wildcats in a shutout and won 41–0. Walk-on freshman RB Braxton Jennings and redshirt freshman RB Shaun Boykins Jr. combined for 42 carries and 258 yards, and a touchdown.

Louisille was selected to play in the 2025 Boca Raton Bowl against Toldeo. Louisville won the game 27–22 to finish the season 9–4 marking the third straight season with at least 9 wins.

The Louisville Cardinals drew an average home attendance of 50,292.

== Offseason ==
=== Personnel ===
In June, Louisville hired Vince Marrow in an off-field role as the Executive Director of Player Personnel and Recruiting. The position is expected to handle roster management, recruiting, and the transfer portal. Marrow was hired away from rival Kentucky where he was a long time assistant coach and recruiter. In his time at Kentucky, he was regarded as one of the top recruiters in the country.

=== Players leaving for NFL ===
Louisville had three players chosen in the 2025 NFL draft.

==== NFL draftees ====
Round	Pick	Player	Position	NFL team
2	40	Tyler Shough	QB	New Orleans Saints
3	66	Ashton Gillotte	DE	Kansas City Chiefs
4	131	Quincy Riley	CB	New Orleans Saints

==== Undrafted free agents ====
Player	Position	NFL team
Ja'Corey Brooks	WR	Washington Commanders
Mark Redman	TE	Los Angeles Rams
Corey Thornton	DB	Carolina Panthers
Thor Griffith	DT	Seattle Seahawks

== Preseason ==
The Atlantic Coast Conference preseason poll was released on July 30. Louisville was predicted to finish fifth in the conference.

=== Preseason ACC awards ===
First Team

Position	Player	Class
Offense
RB	Isaac Brown	So.
WR	Chris Bell	Jr.

=== Award watch lists ===
Award	Player	Position	Year	Source
Dodd Trophy	Jeff Brohm	HC	–	
Maxwell Award	Isaac Brown	RB	So.	
Butkus Award	Stanquan Clark	LB	Jr.	
Paul Hornung Award	Isaac Brown	RB	So.	
Wuerffel Trophy	Clev Lubin	DL	(redshirt) Jr.	
Patrick Mannelly Award	Shai Kochav	LS	(redshirt) Sr.	
Walter Camp Award	Isaac Brown	RB	So.	
Doak Walker Award	Isaac Brown	RB	So.	
Doak Walker Award	Duke Watson	RB	So.	
Biletnikoff Award	Chris Bell	WR	Sr.	
Rimington Trophy	Pete Nygra	C	(redshirt) Jr.	
Comeback Player of the Year Award	Caullin Lacy	WR	(redshirt) Sr.	
Johnny Unitas Golden Arm Award	Miller Moss	QB	Sr.	
Davey O'Brien Award	Miller Moss	QB	Sr.	

== Schedule ==
Date	Time	Opponent	Rank	Site	TV	Result	Attendance
August 30	3:00 p.m.	Eastern Kentucky*		L&N Federal Credit Union Stadium; Louisville, KY	ACCN	W 51–17	50,536
September 5	7:30 p.m.	James Madison*		L&N Federal Credit Union Stadium; Louisville, KY	ESPN2	W 28–14	48,717
September 20	12:00 p.m.	Bowling Green*		L&N Federal Credit Union Stadium; Louisville, KY	ACCN	W 40–17	49,482
September 27	12:00 p.m.	at Pittsburgh		Acrisure Stadium; Pittsburgh, PA	ESPN2	W 34–27	45,301
October 4	3:30 p.m.	No. 24 Virginia		L&N Federal Credit Union Stadium; Louisville, KY	ESPN2	L 27–30 ^{OT}	50,032
October 17	7:00 p.m.	at No. 2 Miami (FL)		Hard Rock Stadium; Miami Gardens, FL (rivalry)	ESPN	W 24–21	66,573
October 25	7:30 p.m.	Boston College^{†}	No. 19	L&N Federal Credit Union Stadium; Louisville, KY	ACCN	W 38–24	50,320
November 1	3:00 p.m.	at Virginia Tech	No. 16	Lane Stadium; Blacksburg, VA	The CW	W 28–16	54,030
November 8	7:00 p.m.	California	No. 15	L&N Federal Credit Union Stadium; Louisville, KY	ESPN2	L 26–29 ^{OT}	51,381
November 14	7:30 p.m.	Clemson	No. 20	L&N Federal Credit Union Stadium; Louisville, KY	ESPN	L 19–20	51,234
November 22	12:00 p.m.	at SMU		Gerald J. Ford Stadium; Dallas, TX	ESPN2	L 6–38	32,713
November 29	12:00 p.m.	Kentucky*		L&N Federal Credit Union Stadium; Louisville, KY (Governor's Cup)	ACCN	W 41–0	50,634
December 23	2:00 p.m.	vs. Toledo*		Flagler Credit Union Stadium; Boca Raton, FL (Boca Raton Bowl)	ESPN	W 27–22	15,329
*Non-conference game; ^{†}Homecoming; Rankings from AP Poll (and CFP Rankings, after November 4) - Released prior to game; All times are in Eastern time

== Roster ==
2025 Louisville Cardinals football team roster
Players
Coaches
Offense

Pos.	#	Name	Class
WR	0	Chris Bell	Sr
RB	1	Isaac Brown	So
WR	2	TreyShun Hurry	Jr
WR	3	Dacari Collins	Sr
WR	5	Caullin Lacy	Sr
QB	7	Miller Moss	Sr
QB	10	Mason Mims	Fr
QB	12	Brady Allen	Jr
QB	13	Deuce Adams	Fr
WR	14	Kris Hughes	So
WR	15	Antonio Meeks	Sr
QB	17	Travis Egan	So
WR	18	Sam Young	Jr
QB	20	Ryan Zimmerman	Fr
RB	22	Keyjuan Brown	So
RB	26	Duke Watson	So
RB	33	Jamarice Wilder	Fr
WR	42	Emmanuel Ulnfin	Fr
RB	43	Shammai Gates	Fr
WR	44	Eli Adams	Fr
RB	46	Braxton Jennings	Fr
WR	47	Jaedon King	Jr
WR	49	DeVuan Jones	Fr
OL	50	Pete Nygra	Sr
OL	51	Michael Flores	Sr
OL	52	Fred Johnson	Fr
OL	53	Lance Robinson	Sr
OL	55	Jimmy Williams III	Fr
OL	56	Carter Guillaume	Fr
OL	57	Naeer Jackson	Jr
OL	59	Victor Cutler	Sr
OL	60	Rasheed Miller	Sr
OL	61	Gradey Anthony	Fr
OL	65	Ellis McAdoo	Fr
OL	66	Makylan Pounders	Sr
OL	67	James Glover-Tyson	So
OL	70	Trevonte Sylvester	Sr
OL	71	Mahamane Moussa	Sr
OL	72	Sam Secrest	Jr
OL	74	Jordan Church	So
QB	75	Tyler Folmar	Fr
OL	75	Cameron Gorin	Fr
OL	77	Ransom McDermott	Fr
WR	80	Brock Coffman	Fr
WR	81	Bobby Golden	Jr
WR	82	Terrance McWilliams	Jr
TE	83	Grant Houser	Fr
TE	84	Davon Mitchell	Fr
TE	85	Nate Kurisky	Jr
TE	86	Jacob Stewart	Sr
TE	87	Dylan Mesman	Fr
TE	88	Jaleel Skinner	Jr
WR	89	Shaun Boykins	Fr
TE	90	Hamilton Atkins	Fr

Defense

Pos.	#	Name	Class
DB	4	Jabari Mack	Sr
LB	6	Stanquan Clark	Jr
DB	7	Rodney Johnson	Sr
LB	9	Antonio Watts	Jr
DL	10	CJ May	Fr
LB	11	T. J. Capers	So
LB	12	Kalib Perry	Sr
DB	13	Justin Agu	Jr
DL	17	Adonijah Green	So
DL	19	Justin Beadles	Sr
DB	20	Antonio Harris	Fr
DB	21	D'Angelo Hutchinson	Sr
DL	23	Wesley Bailey	Sr
DB	24	Corey Gordon	Jr
DB	25	Darius Thomas	Jr
DB	27	JoJo Evans	Sr
DB	28	Daeh McCullough	So
DB	29	Blake Ruffin	Sr
DB	30	Rae'mon Mosby	Fr
DB	31	Micah Rice	Fr
DB	33	Nigel Williams	Sr
LB	34	T. J. Quinn	Sr
DB	36	Destin Cheirs	Fr
LB	38	Cameron White	Fr
DL	40	Eric Hazzard	Fr
LB	41	Caleb Matelau	Fr
DB	42	Jaden Minkins	So
LB	43	Trent Carter	Fr
DL	44	Selah Brown	Jr
DL	45	Denzel Lowry	Sr
LB	46	Brady McEnaney	Fr
DB	48	Anderson Mitchell	Fr
DB	49	Eli Limouris	Fr
DL	50	Clev Lubin	Jr
LB	54	Jaxon Panariello	So
DL	58	Xavier Porter	Fr
DL	62	Chris Jones	Fr
DL	90	Rene Konga	Sr
DL	91	Kendrick Gilbert	So
DL	92	Micah Carter	So
DL	93	Bailey Abercrombie	Fr
DL	94	Dillon Smith	Fr
DL	95	Jerry Lawson	Jr
DL	97	Maurice Davis	Fr
DL	99	Jordan Guerad	Sr

Special teams

Pos.	#	Name	Class
LS	32	Hayden Travelstead	So
K	35	Carson Hilbert	Fr
K	36	Cooper Ranvier	Fr
P	39	Carter Schwartz	So
LS	48	Shai Kochav	Sr
P	90	Adam Winkenhofer	Fr
K	93	David Chapeau	Sr
K	98	Nick Keller	Jr

Head coach

- Jeff Brohm

Coordinators/assistant coaches

- Brian Brohm – Offensive coordinator/Quarterbacks
- Mark Hagen – Co-defensive coordinator/Defensive linemen
- Ron English – Co-defensive coordinator/Secondary
- Chris Barclay – Running backs
- Deion Branch – Wide receivers
- Steve Ellis – Cornerbacks
- Mark Ivey – Linebackers
- Karl Maslowski – Special teams coordinator/Linebackers
- Richard Owens – Offensive lineman
- Ryan Wallace – Tight ends/special teams
- Domenic Reno – Director, strength and conditioning
- Brison Manor – Assistant, strength and conditioning
- Geoff Stanford – Assistant, strength and conditioning
- Will Bramel – Graduate assistant
- Brentton Ervin – Graduate assistant

Legend

- (C) Team captain
- (S) Suspended
- (I) Ineligible
- Injured
- Redshirt

Roster
Last update: 08/06/25

== Game summaries ==
=== vs. Eastern Kentucky (FCS) ===
Louisville Cardinals (0–0) vs. Eastern Kentucky Colonels (0–0) – Game summary

Quarter	1	2	3	4	Total
Eastern Kentucky	0	7	0	10	17
Louisville	21	20	7	3	51

at L&N Federal Credit Union Stadium • Louisville, KY

- Date: August 30
- Game time: 3:00 p.m.
- Game weather: Sunny • Temperature: 79 °F (26 °C) • Wind: SW at 7 miles per hour (11 km/h)
- Game attendance: 50,536
- Referee: Justin Elliot
- TV announcers (ACCN): Jorge Sedano (play-by-play), Rodney McLeod (analyst) and Victoria Arlen (sideline)

Game information

First quarter

- (9:48) LOU – Isaac Brown 31-yard run (Cooper Ranvier kick) (Drive: 10 plays, 85 yards, 5:07; Louisville 7–0)
- (7:49) LOU – Caullin Lacy 93-yard punt return (Cooper Ranvier kick) (Louisville 14–0)
- (0:44) LOU – Miller Moss 8-yard run (Cooper Ranvier kick) (Drive: 10 plays, 79 yards, 4:28; Louisville 21–0)

Second quarter

- (11:05) LOU – Isaac Brown 68-yard run (Cooper Ranvier kick) (Drive: 3 plays, 75 yards, 0:52; Louisville 28–0)
- (8:26) LOU – Duke Watson 30-yard pass from Miller Moss (Cooper Ranvier kick) (Drive: 1 play, 30 yards, 0:09; Louisville 35–0)
- (2:58) LOU – Keyjuan Brown 1-yard run (Cooper Ranvier PAT failed) (Drive: 10 plays, 67 yards, 4:02; Louisville 41–0)
- (0:50) EKU – Vito Tisdale 29-yard interception return (Buzz Flabiano kick) (Louisville 41–7)

Third quarter

- (8:26) LOU – Kris Hughes 30-yard pass from Brady Allen (Nick Keller kick) (Drive: 1 play, 30 yards, 0:09; Louisville 48–7)

Fourth quarter

- (14:18) EKU – Brady Hensley 1-yard run (Buzz Flabiano kick) (Drive: 4 plays, 16 yards, 1:32; Louisville 48–14)
- (8:23) LOU – Cooper Ranvier 23-yard field goal (Drive: 11 plays, 70 yards, 5:55; Louisville 51–14)
- (1:06) EKU – Buzz Flabiano 38-yard field goal (Drive: 13 plays, 69 yards, 7:10; Louisville 51–17)

Statistics	EKU	LOU
First downs	10	28
Total yards	150	542
Rushes–yards	39–74	30–229
Passing yards	76	313
Passing: comp–att–int	5–14–0	25–37–3
Turnovers	0	3
Time of possession	29:35	30:25

Team	Category	Player	Statistics
Eastern Kentucky	Passing	Myles Burkett	5–14, 76 yards
Eastern Kentucky	Rushing	Brayden Latham	10 carries, 25 yards
Eastern Kentucky	Receiving	Marcus Calwise Jr.	1 reception, 29 yards
Louisville	Passing	Miller Moss	17–25, 223 yards, TD, 2 INT
Louisville	Rushing	Isaac Brown	6 carries, 126 yards, 2 TD
Louisville	Receiving	Chris Bell	5 receptions, 63 yards

=== vs. James Madison ===
Louisville Cardinals (1–0) vs. James Madison Dukes (1–0) – Game summary

Quarter	1	2	3	4	Total
James Madison	7	0	7	0	14
Louisville	0	6	8	14	28

at L&N Federal Credit Union Stadium • Louisville, KY

- Date: September 5
- Game time: 7:00 p.m.
- Game weather: Sunny • Temperature: 79 °F (26 °C) • Wind: NW at 10 miles per hour (16 km/h)
- Game attendance: 48,717
- Referee: Mike Roche
- TV announcers (ESPN2): Anish Shroff (play-by-play), Andre Ware (analyst) and Paul Carcaterra (sideline)

Game information

First quarter

- (4:01) JMU – Lacota Dippre 3-yard pass from Alonza Barnett (Morgan Suarez kick) (Drive: 11 plays, 39 yards, 5:35; James Madison 7–0)

Second quarter

- (5:21) LOU – Cooper Ranvier 22-yard field goal (Drive: 13 plays, 56 yards, 5:58; James Madison 7–3)
- (0:09) LOU – Cooper Ranvier 38-yard field goal (Drive: 7 plays, 17 yards, 1:33; James Madison 7–6)

Third quarter

- (10:10) JMU – Matthew Sluka 8-yard run (Morgan Suarez kick) (Drive: 9 plays, 75 yards, 4:50; James Madison 14–6)
- (8:37) LOU – Chris Bell 64-yard pass from Miller Moss (Miller Moss run) (Drive: 4 plays, 75 yards, 1:33; Tied 14–14)

Fourth quarter

- (13:05) LOU – AJ Green 0-yard fumble recovery (Cooper Ranvier PAT failed) (Louisville 20–14)
- (3:31) LOU – Isaac Brown 78-yard run (Dacari Collins pass from Miller Moss) (Drive: 2 plays, 81 yards, 0:54; Louisville 28–14)

Statistics	JMU	LOU
First downs	19	12
Total yards	263	264
Rushes–yards	47–126	30–113
Passing yards	137	151
Passing: comp–att–int	18–31–1	13–23–0
Turnovers	2	1
Time of possession	37:18	22:42

Team	Category	Player	Statistics
James Madison	Passing	Alonza Barnett	15–25, 102 yards, TD
James Madison	Rushing	Matthew Sluka	21 carries, 83 yards, TD
James Madison	Receiving	Landon Ellis	3 receptions, 55 yards
Louisville	Passing	Miller Moss	13–23, 151 yards, TD
Louisville	Rushing	Isaac Brown	12 carries, 104 yards, TD
Louisville	Receiving	Chris Bell	4 receptions, 83 yards, TD

=== vs. Bowling Green ===
Louisville Cardinals (2–0) vs. Bowling Green Falcons (2–1) – Game summary

Quarter	1	2	3	4	Total
Bowling Green	3	0	0	14	17
Louisville	7	14	9	10	40

at L&N Federal Credit Union Stadium • Louisville, KY

- Date: September 20
- Game time: 12:00 p.m.
- Game weather: Sunny • Temperature: 81 °F (27 °C) • Wind: NW at 3 miles per hour (4.8 km/h)
- Game attendance: 49,482
- Referee: Darryl DeBerry
- TV announcers (ACCN): Chris Cotter (play-by-play), Max Browne (analyst) and Kendra Douglas (sideline)

Game information

First quarter

- (6:44) BGSU – Jackson Kleather 49-yard field goal (Drive: 4 plays, 8 yards, 2:07; Bowling Green 3–0)
- (2:03) LOU – Keyjuan Brown 2-yard run (Cooper Ranvier kick) (Drive: 7 plays, 60 yards, 4:41; Louisville 7–3)

Second quarter

- (10:27) LOU – Keyjuan Brown 1-yard run (Cooper Ranvier kick) (Drive: 10 plays, 79 yards, 4:20; Louisville 14–3)
- (8:13) LOU – Caullin Lacy 75-yard punt return (Cooper Ranvier kick) (Louisville 21–3)

Third quarter

- (10:34) LOU – Cooper Ranvier 24-yard field goal (Drive: 8 plays, 68 yards, 4:26; Louisville 24–3)
- (7:21) LOU – Cooper Ranvier 40-yard field goal (Drive: 5 plays, 33 yards, 1:07; Louisville 27–3)
- (2:24) LOU – Nick Keller 57-yard field goal (Drive: 8 plays, 26 yards, 4:10; Louisville 30–3)

Fourth quarter

- (12:53) LOU – Cooper Ranvier 48-yard field goal (Drive: 4 plays, 5 yards, 1:57; Louisville 33–3)
- (12:37) BGSU – Lucien Anderson III 75-yard run (Jackson Kleather kick) (Drive: 2 plays, 75 yards, 0:16; Louisville 33–10)
- (6:50) LOU – Braxton Jennings 3-yard run (Cooper Ranvier kick) (Drive: 9 plays, 75 yards, 5:47; Louisville 40–10)
- (4:16) BGSU – Jacob Harris 38-yard pass from Drew Pyne (Jackson Kleather kick) (Drive: 4 plays, 75 yards, 2:34; Louisville 40–17)

Statistics	BGSU	LOU
First downs	14	21
Total yards	326	468
Rushes–yards	29–195	29–155
Passing yards	131	313
Passing: comp–att–int	11–21–2	24–32–0
Turnovers	2	1
Time of possession	25:45	34:15

Team	Category	Player	Statistics
Bowling Green	Passing	Drew Pyne	11–21, 131 yards, TD, 2 INT
Bowling Green	Rushing	Lucien Anderson III	4 carries, 79 yards, TD
Bowling Green	Receiving	Jacob Harris	3 receptions, 46 yards, TD
Louisville	Passing	Miller Moss	23–31, 316 yards
Louisville	Rushing	Keyjuan Brown	11 carries, 83 yards, 2 TD
Louisville	Receiving	Caullin Lacy	8 receptions, 96 yards

=== at Pittsburgh ===
Louisville Cardinals (3–0) at Pittsburgh Panthers (2–1) – Game summary

Quarter	1	2	3	4	Total
Louisville	0	17	3	14	34
Pittsburgh	17	10	0	0	27

at Acrisure Stadium • Pittsburgh, PA

- Date: September 27
- Game time: 12:00 p.m.
- Game weather: Cloudy • Temperature: 71 °F (22 °C) • Wind: NE at 4 miles per hour (6.4 km/h)
- Game attendance: 45,301
- Referee: Justin Elliott
- TV announcers (ESPN2): Roy Philpott (play-by-play), Sam Acho (analyst) and Taylor Davis (sideline)

Game information

First quarter

- (11:34) PITT – Trey Butkowski 30-yard field goal (Drive: 10 plays, 77 yards, 3:21; Pittsburgh 3–0)
- (9:53) PITT – Cataurus Hicks 39-yard pass from Eli Holstein (Trey Butkowski kick) (Drive: 2 plays, 53 yards, 0:28; Pittsburgh 10–0)
- (1:41) PITT – Rasheem Biles 75-yard interception return (Trey Butkowski kick) (Pittsburgh 17–0)

Second quarter

- (12:32) LOU – Miller Moss 1-yard run (Cooper Ranvier kick) (Drive: 3 plays, 3 yards, 1:31; Pittsburgh 17–7)
- (5:03) LOU – Cooper Ranvier 35-yard field goal (Drive: 14 plays, 65 yards, 6:11; Pittsburgh 17–10)
- (3:42) LOU – Chris Bell 25-yard pass from Miller Moss (Cooper Ranvier kick) (Drive: 1 play, 25 yards, 0:06; Tied 17–17)
- (1:42) PITT – Trey Butkowski 37-yard field goal (Drive: 9 plays, 56 yards, 2:00; Pittsburgh 20–17)
- (0:19) PITT – Raphael Williams Jr. 38-yard pass from Eli Holstein (Trey Butkowski kick) (Drive: 4 plays, 66 yards, 0:32; Pittsburgh 27–17)

Third quarter

- (11:44) LOU – Nick Keller 57-yard field goal (Drive: 7 plays, 36 yards, 3:16; Pittsburgh 27–20)

Fourth quarter

- (10:49) LOU – Jaleel Skinner 12-yard pass from Miller Moss (Cooper Ranvier kick) (Drive: 6 plays, 61 yards, 2:34; Tied 27–27)
- (7:03) LOU – Nate Kurisky 9-yard pass from Miller Moss (Cooper Ranvier kick) (Drive: 6 plays, 30 yards, 2:58; Louisville 34–27)

Statistics	LOU	PITT
First downs	23	14
Total yards	392	339
Rushes–yards	34–53	23–80
Passing yards	339	259
Passing: comp–att–int	33–51–1	17–32–3
Turnovers	1	5
Time of possession	39:22	20:38

Team	Category	Player	Statistics
Louisville	Passing	Miller Moss	33–51, 339 yards, 3 TD, INT
Louisville	Rushing	Duke Watson	14 carries, 47 yards
Louisville	Receiving	Chris Bell	10 receptions, 135 yards, TD
Pittsburgh	Passing	Eli Holstein	14–26, 228 yards, 2 TD, 2 INT
Pittsburgh	Rushing	Ja'Kyrian Turner	6 carries, 36 yards
Pittsburgh	Receiving	Cataurus Hicks	4 receptions, 113 yards, TD

=== vs. No. 24 Virginia ===
Louisville Cardinals (4–0) vs. No. 24 Virginia Cavaliers (4–1) – Game summary

Quarter	1	2	3	4	OT	Total
No. 24 Virginia	7	7	10	0	6	30
Louisville	7	7	0	10	3	27

at L&N Federal Credit Union Stadium • Louisville, KY

- Date: October 4
- Game time: 3:30 p.m.
- Game weather: Sunny • Temperature: 82 °F (28 °C) • Wind: NW at 5 miles per hour (8.0 km/h)
- Game attendance: 50,032
- Referee: Tim Hedgepeth
- TV announcers (ESPN2): Mike Monaco (play-by-play), Kirk Morrison (analyst), and Dawn Davenport (sideline)

Game information

First quarter

- (6:12) UVA – Donavon Platt 62-yard fumble return (Will Bettridge kick) (Virginia 7–0)
- (0:00) LOU – Miller Moss 1-yard run (Cooper Ranvier kick) (Drive: 12 plays, 75 yards, 6:11; Tied 7–7)

Second quarter

- (6:56) UVA – Cam Ross 19-yard pass from Chandler Morris (Will Bettridge kick) (Drive: 16 plays, 75 yards, 8:04; Virginia 14–7)
- (3:26) LOU – Chris Bell 15-yard pass from Miller Moss (Cooper Ranvier kick) (Drive: 7 plays, 70 yards, 3:30; Tied 14–14)

Third quarter

- (6:25) UVA – Donavon Platt 47-yard interception return (Will Bettridge kick) (Virginia 21–14)
- (0:30) UVA – Will Bettridge 46-yard field goal (Drive: 5 plays, 11 yards, 1:13; Virginia 24–14)

Fourth quarter

- (9:41) LOU – Chris Bell 13-yard pass from Miller Moss (Cooper Ranvier kick) (Drive: 6 plays, 55 yards, 2:48; Virginia 24–21)
- (1:08) LOU – Cooper Ranvier 50-yard field goal (Drive: 10 plays, 40 yards, 3:23; Tied 24–24)

Overtime

- LOU – Cooper Ranvier 24-yard field goal (Drive: 5 plays, 19 yards; Louisville 27–24)
- UVA – J'Mari Taylor 2-yard run (Drive: 4 plays, 25 yards; Virginia 30–27)

Statistics	UVA	LOU
First downs	14	26
Total yards	237	383
Rushes–yards	32–88	27–55
Passing yards	149	329
Passing: comp–att–int	19–31–0	34–48–1
Turnovers	0	2
Time of possession	27:41	32:19

Team	Category	Player	Statistics
Virginia	Passing	Chandler Morris	19–31, 149 yards, TD
Virginia	Rushing	J'Mari Taylor	16 carries, 68 yards, TD
Virginia	Receiving	Cam Ross	4 receptions, 48 yards, TD
Louisville	Passing	Miller Moss	34–48, 329 yards, 2 TD, INT
Louisville	Rushing	Isaac Brown	13 carries, 66 yards
Louisville	Receiving	Chris Bell	12 receptions, 170 yards, 2 TD

=== at No. 2 Miami (FL) ===
Louisville Cardinals (4–1) at No. 2 Miami Hurricanes (5–0) – Game summary

Quarter	1	2	3	4	Total
Louisville	14	0	3	7	24
No. 2 Miami (FL)	7	3	3	8	21

at Hard Rock Stadium • Miami Gardens, FL

- Date: October 17
- Game time: 7:00 p.m.
- Game weather: Cloudy • Temperature: 79 °F (26 °C) • Wind: NE at 7 miles per hour (11 km/h)
- Game attendance: 66,573
- Referee: Adam Savoie
- TV announcers (ESPN): Dave Pasch (play-by-play), Dusty Dvoracek (analyst), and Taylor McGregor (sideline)

Game information

First quarter

- (8:55) LOU – Miller Moss 1-yard run (Cooper Ranvier kick) (Drive: 11 plays, 75 yards, 6:05; Louisville 7–0)
- (5:09) LOU – Chris Bell 35-yard pass from Miller Moss (Cooper Ranvier kick) (Drive: 4 plays, 46 yards, 2:06; Louisville 14–0)
- (2:19) MIA – Mark Fletcher Jr. 2-yard run (Carter Davis kick) (Drive: 5 plays, 75 yards, 2:50; Louisville 14–7)

Second quarter

- (1:56) MIA – Carter Davis 27-yard field goal (Drive: 7 plays, 61 yards, 3:34; Louisville 14–10)

Third quarter

- (10:58) LOU – Cooper Ranvier 48-yard field goal (Drive: 6 plays, 34 yards, 2:22; Louisville 17–10)
- (1:51) MIA – Carter Davis 41-yard field goal (Drive: 6 plays, 32 yards, 2:52; Louisville 17–13)

Fourth quarter

- (13:27) LOU – Chris Bell 36-yard pass from Miller Moss (Cooper Ranvier kick) (Drive: 8 plays, 75 yards, 3:24; Louisville 24–13)
- (7:37) MIA – Malachi Toney 12-yard run (CJ Daniels pass from Malachi Toney) (Drive: 1 play, 12 yards, 0:05; Louisville 24–21)

Statistics	LOU	MIA
First downs	21	15
Total yards	367	334
Rushes–yards	31–119	24–63
Passing yards	248	271
Passing: comp–att–int	23–37–0	25–35–4
Turnovers	1	4
Time of possession	31:16	28:44

Team	Category	Player	Statistics
Louisville	Passing	Miller Moss	23–37, 248 yards, 2 TD
Louisville	Rushing	Isaac Brown	15 carries, 113 yards
Louisville	Receiving	Chris Bell	9 receptions, 136 yards, 2 TD
Miami (FL)	Passing	Carson Beck	25–35, 271 yards, 4 INT
Miami (FL)	Rushing	Mark Fletcher Jr.	8 carries, 18 yards, TD
Miami (FL)	Receiving	Malachi Toney	9 receptions, 135 yards

=== vs. Boston College ===
No. 19 Louisville Cardinals (5–1) vs. Boston College Eagles (1–6) – Game summary

Quarter	1	2	3	4	Total
Boston College	3	7	7	7	24
No. 19 Louisville	7	14	7	10	38

at L&N Federal Credit Union Stadium • Louisville, KY

- Date: October 25
- Game time: 7:30 p.m.
- Game weather: Cloudy • Temperature: 57 °F (14 °C) • Wind: NE at 6 miles per hour (9.7 km/h)
- Game attendance: 50,320
- Referee: Riley Johnson
- TV announcers (ACCN): Jorge Sedano (play-by-play), Rodney McLeod (analyst), and Victoria Arlen (sideline)

Game information

First quarter

- (6:36) BC – Luca Lombardo 38-yard field goal (Drive: 15 plays, 55 yards, 8:24; Boston College 3–0)
- (4:49) LOU – Miller Moss 1-yard run (Cooper Ranvier kick) (Drive: 3 plays, 75 yards, 1:47; Louisville 7–3)

Second quarter

- (14:56) BC – Lewis Bond 6-yard pass from Grayson James (Luca Lombardo kick) (Drive: 10 plays, 75 yards, 4:53; Boston College 10–7)
- (1:42) LOU – Miller Moss 9-yard run (Cooper Ranvier kick) (Drive: 5 plays, 56 yards, 1:10; Louisville 14–10)
- (1:02) LOU – Isaac Brown 62-yard run (Cooper Ranvier kick) (Drive: 1 play, 62 yards, 0:09; Louisville 21–10)

Third quarter

- (14:08) BC – Kaelan Chudzinski 23-yard pass from Grayson James (Luca Lombardo kick) (Drive: 2 plays, 34 yards, 0:42; Louisville 21–17)
- (7:34) LOU – Caullin Lacy 22-yard pass from Miller Moss (Cooper Ranvier kick) (Drive: 2 plays, 27 yards, 0:16; Louisville 28–17)

Fourth quarter

- (8:13) LOU – Cooper Ranvier 41-yard field goal (Drive: 4 plays, 7 yards, 2:21; Louisville 31–17)
- (6:17) BC – Jeremiah Franklin 21-yard pass from Grayson James (Luca Lombardo kick) (Drive: 8 plays, 68 yards, 1:48; Louisville 31–24)
- (1:49) LOU – Keyjuan Brown 67-yard run (Cooper Ranvier kick) (Drive: 5 plays, 83 yards, 1:10; Louisville 38–24)

Statistics	BC	LOU
First downs	20	16
Total yards	360	504
Rushes–yards	36–116	31–317
Passing yards	244	187
Passing: comp–att–int	23–46–2	15–28–1
Turnovers	3	3
Time of possession	35:44	24:16

Team	Category	Player	Statistics
Boston College	Passing	Grayson James	23–46, 244 yards, 3 TD, 2 INT
Boston College	Rushing	Jordan McDonald	19 carries, 80 yards
Boston College	Receiving	Kaelan Chudzinski	4 receptions, 80 yards, TD
Louisville	Passing	Miller Moss	15–28, 187 yards, TD, INT
Louisville	Rushing	Isaac Brown	14 carries, 205 yards, TD
Louisville	Receiving	Chris Bell	4 receptions, 49 yards

=== at Virginia Tech ===
No. 16 Louisville Cardinals (6–1) at Virginia Tech Hokies (3–5) – Game summary

Quarter	1	2	3	4	Total
No. 16 Louisville	7	0	14	7	28
Virginia Tech	9	7	0	0	16

at Lane Stadium • Blacksburg, VA

- Date: November 1
- Game time: 3:00 p.m.
- Game weather: Sunny • Temperature: 58 °F (14 °C) • Wind: W at 3 miles per hour (4.8 km/h)
- Game attendance: 54,030
- Referee: Derryl DeBerry
- TV announcers (The CW): Thom Brennaman (play-by-play), Will Blackmon (analyst), and Wes Bryant (sideline)

Game information

First quarter

- (12:58) LOU – Isaac Brown 52-yard run (Cooper Ranvier kick) (Drive: 2 plays, 62 yards, 0:42; Louisville 7–0)
- (1:57) VT – Kyron Drones 3-yard run (John Love kick) (Drive: 9 plays, 37 yards, 4:56; Tied 7–7)
- (0:52) VT – Team safety (Virginia Tech 9–7)

Second quarter

- (8:25) VT – Cameron Seldon 5-yard pass from Kyron Drones (John Love kick) (Drive: 8 plays, 54 yards, 3:40; Virginia Tech 16–7)

Third quarter

- (9:07) LOU – Caullin Lacy 24-yard pass from Miller Moss (Cooper Ranvier kick) (Drive: 6 plays, 53 yards, 2:55; Virginia Tech 16–14)
- (5:01) LOU – Keyjuan Brown 2-yard run (Cooper Ranvier kick) (Drive: 2 plays, 5 yards, 0:41; Louisville 21–16)

Fourth quarter

- (2:16) LOU – Keyjuan Brown 24-yard run (Cooper Ranvier kick) (Drive: 7 plays, 63 yards, 3:41; Louisville 28–16)

Statistics	LOU	VT
First downs	18	16
Total yards	371	240
Rushes–yards	34–235	40–164
Passing yards	136	76
Passing: comp–att–int	19–28–1	11–24–0
Turnovers	1	0
Time of possession	30:22	29:38

Team	Category	Player	Statistics
Louisville	Passing	Miller Moss	19–28, 136 yards, TD, INT
Louisville	Rushing	Isaac Brown	16 carries, 130 yards, TD
Louisville	Receiving	Chris Bell	8 receptions, 56 yards
Virginia Tech	Passing	Kyron Drones	11–24, 76 yards, TD
Virginia Tech	Rushing	Kyron Drones	14 carries, 85 yards, TD
Virginia Tech	Receiving	Ayden Greene	1 reception, 17 yards

=== vs. California ===
No. 15 Louisville Cardinals (7–1) vs. California Golden Bears (5–4) – Game summary

Quarter	1	2	3	4	OT	Total
California	7	10	6	0	6	29
No. 15 Louisville	7	6	7	3	3	26

at L&N Federal Credit Union Stadium • Louisville, KY

- Date: November 8
- Game time: 7:00 p.m.
- Game weather: Cloudy • Temperature: 58 °F (14 °C) • Wind: NW at 1 mile per hour (1.6 km/h)
- Game attendance: 51,381
- Referee: Jon Noli
- TV announcers (ESPN2): Dave Flemming (play-by-play), Brock Osweiler (analyst), and Stormy Buonantony (sideline)

Game information

First quarter

- (5:11) LOU – Duke Watson 1-yard run, Cooper Ranvier kick (Drive: 10 plays, 78 yards, 5:22; Louisville 7–0)
- (0:40) CAL – Landon Morris 20-yard pass from Jaron-Keawe Sagapolutele, Chase Meyer kick (Drive: 6 plays, 74 yards, 2:07; Tied 7–7)

Second quarter

- (11:01) LOU – Cooper Ranvier 30-yard field goal (Drive: 12 plays, 67 yards, 4:35; Louisville 10–7)
- (5:58) CAL – Chase Meyer 27-yard field goal (Drive: 9 plays, 65 yards, 5:03; Tied 10–10)
- (2:34) LOU – Cooper Ranvier 49-yard field goal (Drive: 7 plays, 44 yards, 3:24; Louisville 13–10)
- (0:07) CAL – Kendrick Raphael 2-yard run, Chase Meyer kick, (Drive: 9 plays, 75 yards, 2:27; California 17–13)

Third quarter

- (11:34) CAL – Chase Meyer 45-yard field goal (Drive: 6 plays, 10 yards, 2:32; California 20–13)
- (7:43) LOU – Miller Moss 1-yard run, Cooper Ranvier kick (Drive: 8 plays, 75 yards, 3:51; Tied 20–20)
- (0:23) CAL – Chase Meyer 26-yard field goal (Drive: 13 plays, 67 yards, 7:20; California 23–20)

Fourth quarter

- (11:08) LOU – Cooper Ranvier 39-yard field goal (Drive: 10 plays, 63 yards, 4:08; Tied 23–23)

Overtime

- LOU - Cooper Ranvier 49-yard field goal (Drive: 4 plays, -6 yards; Louisville 26–26)
- CAL - Jacob De Jesus 3-yard pass from Jaron-Keawe Sagapolutele (Drive: 7 plays, 25 yards; California 29–26)

Statistics	CAL	LOU
First downs	21	16
Total yards	427	351
Rushes–yards	25–77	30–148
Passing yards	350	203
Passing: comp–att–int	31–49–0	20–39–1
Turnovers	0	1
Time of possession	29:52	30:08

Team	Category	Player	Statistics
California	Passing	Jaron-Keawe Sagapolutele	30–47, 323 yards, 2 TD
California	Rushing	Kendrick Raphael	19 carries, 83 yards, TD
California	Receiving	Jacob De Jesus	16 receptions, 158 yards, TD
Louisville	Passing	Miller Moss	20–39, 203 yards, INT
Louisville	Rushing	Keyjuan Brown	14 carries, 136 yards
Louisville	Receiving	Caullin Lacy	4 receptions, 60 yards

=== vs. Clemson ===
No. 20 Louisville Cardinals (7–2) vs. Clemson Tigers (4–5) – Game summary

Quarter	1	2	3	4	Total
Clemson	3	7	3	7	20
No. 20 Louisville	3	6	10	0	19

at L&N Federal Credit Union Stadium • Louisville, KY

- Date: November 14
- Game time: 7:30 p.m.
- Game weather: Clear • Temperature: 64 °F (18 °C) • Wind: SW at 5 miles per hour (8.0 km/h)
- Game attendance: 51,234
- Referee: Mike Roche
- TV announcers (ESPN): Anish Shroff (play-by-play), Andre Ware (analyst), and Paul Carcaterra (sideline)

Game information

First quarter

- (08:38) CLEM – Nolan Hauser 27 yard field goal (Drive: 12 plays, 65 yards, 6:22; CLEM 3–0)
- (00:45) LOU – Cooper Ranvier 51 yard field goal (Drive: 8 plays, 55 yards, 3:12; Tied 3–3)

Second quarter

- (08:47) LOU – Miller Moss 4 yard rush, Ranvier kick missed (Drive: 3 plays, 38 yards, 1:14; LOU 9–3)
- (03:13) CLEM – Adam Randall 25-yard rush, Hauser kick (Drive: 1 play, 25 yards, 0:07; CLEM 10–9)

Third quarter

- (11:16) LOU – Nate Kurisky 2 yard pass from Caullin Lacy, Ranvier kick (Drive: 7 plays, 75 yards, 3:44; LOU 16–10)
- (07:07) CLEM – Hauser 48 yard field goal (Drive: 8 plays, 45 yards, 4:09; LOU 16–13)
- (01:32) LOU – Ranvier 39 yard field goal (Drive: 10 plays, 54 yards, 5:35; LOU 19–13)

Fourth quarter

- (07:16) CLEM – Randall 1-yard rush, Hauser kick (Drive: 6 plays, 56 yards, 2:08; CLEM 20–19)

Statistics	CLEM	LOU
First downs	19	16
Total yards	308	385
Rushes–yards	30–121	30–171
Passing yards	187	214
Passing: comp–att–int	22–34–0	20–29–0
Turnovers	1	1
Time of possession	30:55	29:05

Team	Category	Player	Statistics
Clemson	Passing	Cade Klubnik	22–34, 187 yards
Clemson	Rushing	Adam Randall	15 carries, 105 yards, 2 TD
Clemson	Receiving	T. J. Moore	6 receptions, 68 yards
Louisville	Passing	Miller Moss	19–27, 212 yards
Louisville	Rushing	Keyjuan Brown	15 carries, 135 yards
Louisville	Receiving	Chris Bell	5 receptions, 79 yards

=== at SMU ===
Louisville Cardinals (7–3) at SMU Mustangs (7–3) – Game summary

Quarter	1	2	3	4	Total
Louisville	3	3	0	0	6
SMU	7	14	3	14	38

at Gerald J. Ford Stadium • Dallas, TX

- Date: November 22
- Game time: 12:00 p.m.
- Game weather: Sunny • Temperature: 61 °F (16 °C) • Wind: NW at 5 miles per hour (8.0 km/h)
- Game attendance: 32,713
- Referee: Jerry Magallanes
- TV announcers (ESPN2): Roy Philpott (play-by-play), Sam Acho (analyst) and Taylor Davis (sideline)

Game information

First quarter

- SMU – Kevin Jennings 2-yard run (Sam Keltner kick), 10:40. Mustangs 7–0. Drive: 9 plays, 75 yards, 4:20.
- LOU – Cooper Ranvier 36-yard field goal, 4:15. Mustangs 7–3. Drive: 12 plays, 57 yards, 6:25.

Second quarter

- SMU – Jordan Hudson 7-yard pass from Kevin Jennings (Sam Keltner kick), 8:53. Mustangs 14–3. Drive: 10 plays, 59 yards, 5:19.
- SMU – T. J. Harden 5-yard pass from Kevin Jennings (Sam Keltner kick), 3:25. Mustangs 21–3. Drive: 7 plays, 70 yards, 3:29.
- LOU – Cooper Ranvier 29-yard field goal, 1:44. Mustangs 21–6. Drive: 6 plays, 63 yards, 1:41.

Third quarter

- SMU – Sam Keltner 49-yard field goal, 0:48. Mustangs 24–6. Drive: 12 plays, 60 yards, 4:52.

Fourth quarter

- SMU – Yamir Knight 6-yard pass from Kevin Jennings (Sam Keltner kick), 9:38. Mustangs 31–6. Drive: 9 plays, 68 yards, 5:13.
- SMU – Shaadie Clayton-Johnson 50-yard run (Stone Eby kick), 6:03. Mustangs 38–6. Drive: 4 plays, 65 yards, 2:08.

Statistics	LOU	SMU
First downs	12	28
Total yards	228	485
Rushes–yards	29–128	36–178
Passing yards	100	307
Passing: comp–att–int	14–20–1	30–38–0
Turnovers	1	0
Time of possession	24:04	35:56

Team	Category	Player	Statistics
Louisville	Passing	Deuce Adams	12–17, 94 yards
Louisville	Rushing	Shaun Boykins Jr.	8 carries, 52 yards
Louisville	Receiving	Chris Bell	5 receptions, 46 yards
SMU	Passing	Kevin Jennings	29–37, 303 yards, 3 TD
SMU	Rushing	TJ Harden	18 carries, 90 yards
SMU	Receiving	Jordan Hudson	8 receptions, 96 yards, TD

=== vs. Kentucky ===
Louisville Cardinals (7–4) vs. Kentucky Wildcats (5–6) – Game summary

Quarter	1	2	3	4	Total
Kentucky	0	0	0	0	0
Louisville	7	13	7	14	41

at L&N Federal Credit Union Stadium • Louisville, KY

- Date: November 29
- Game time: 12:00 p.m.
- Game weather: Cloudy • Temperature: 36 °F (2 °C) • Wind: SE at 7 miles per hour (11 km/h)
- Game attendance: 50,634
- Referee: Jason Autrey
- TV announcers (ACCN): Jorge Sedano (play-by-play), Rodney McLeod (analyst) and Victoria Arlen (sideline)

Game information

First quarter

- (4:44) LOU – Miller Moss 1-yard run (Cooper Ranvier kick) (Drive: 4 plays, 10 yards, 1:55; Louisville 7–0)

Second quarter

- (14:56) LOU – Cooper Ranvier 34-yard field goal (Drive: 6 plays, 50 yards, 2:11; Louisville 10–0)
- (8:18) LOU – Jacob Stewart 43-yard pass from Miller Moss (Cooper Ranvier kick) (Drive: 8 plays, 80 yards, 2:42; Louisville 17–0)
- (1:45) LOU – Cooper Ranvier 24-yard field goal (Drive: 6 plays, 50 yards, 4:15; Louisville 20–0)

Third quarter

- (8:23) LOU – Shaun Boykins Jr. 5-yard run (Cooper Ranvier kick) (Drive: 2 plays, 15 yards, 0:41; Louisville 27–0)

Fourth quarter

- (10:22) LOU – Dacari Collins 11-yard pass from Miller Moss (Cooper Ranvier kick) (Drive: 17 plays, 99 yards, 10:27; Louisville 34–0)
- (5:23) LOU – Jaleel Skinner 4-yard pass from Miller Moss (Cooper Ranvier kick) (Drive: 6 plays, 30 yards, 4:04; Louisville 41–0)

Statistics	UK	LOU
First downs	10	26
Total yards	140	440
Rushes–yards	26–40	50–258
Passing yards	100	182
Passing: comp–att–int	13–26–2	12–21–0
Turnovers	2	0
Time of possession	23:32	36:28

Team	Category	Player	Statistics
Kentucky	Passing	Cutter Boley	13–26, 100 yards, 2 INT
Kentucky	Rushing	Dante Dowdell	6 carries, 27 yards
Kentucky	Receiving	Hardley Gilmore IV	1 reception, 26 yards
Louisville	Passing	Miller Moss	12–20, 182 yards, 3 TD
Louisville	Rushing	Braxton Jennings	20 carries, 113 yards
Louisville	Receiving	Jacob Stewart	1 reception, 43 yards, TD

=== vs. Toledo (Boca Raton Bowl) ===
2025 Bush's Boca Raton Bowl
Louisville Cardinals (8–4) vs. Toledo Rockets (8–4) – Game summary

Quarter	1	2	3	4	Total
Toledo	3	0	0	19	22
Louisville	7	0	7	13	27

at Flagler Credit Union Stadium • Boca Raton, FL

- Date: December 23
- Game time: 2:00 p.m.
- Game weather: Clear • Temperature: 77 °F (25 °C)
- Game attendance: 15,329
- Referee: Charles Lamertina
- TV announcers (ESPN): Jay Alter (play-by-play), Rocky Boiman (analyst) and Ashley Stroehlein (sideline)

Game information

First quarter

- (10:26) LOU – TreyShun Hurry 17-yard pass from Miller Moss (Cooper Ranvier kick) (Drive: 8 plays, 75 yards, 4:34; Louisville 7–0)
- (0:11) TOL – Robert Hammond III 41-yard field goal (Drive: 10 plays, 34 yards, 4:55; Louisville 7–3)

Second quarter

- No scoring plays

Third quarter

- (3:40) LOU – Antonio Meeks 5-yard pass from Miller Moss (Cooper Ranvier kick) (Drive: 9 plays, 77 yards, 4:55; Louisville 14–3)

Fourth quarter

- (14:53) LOU – Isaac Brown 11-yard run (Cooper Ranvier kick) (Drive: 2 plays, 15 yards, 0:41; Louisville 21–3)
- (10:42) TOL – Jacob Petersen 26-yard pass from Kalieb Osborne (Chip Trayanum run) (Drive: 10 plays, 74 yards, 4:11; Louisville 21–11)
- (6:35) TOL – Robert Hammond III 50-yard field goal (Drive: 6 plays, 18 yards, 2:21; Louisville 21–14)
- (5:03) LOU – Isaac Brown 53-yard run (Avery Smith defensive PAT conversion) (Drive: 3 plays, 75 yards, 1:32; Louisville 27–16)
- (2:22) TOL – Chip Trayanum 3-yard run (Two-point conversion failed) (Drive: 6 plays, 68 yards, 2:24; Louisville 27–22)

Statistics	TOL	LOU
First downs	20	23
Total yards	336	333
Rushes–yards	40–169	36–180
Passing yards	167	153
Passing: comp–att–int	17–28–0	16–24–0
Turnovers	1	1
Time of possession	31:46	28:14

Team	Category	Player	Statistics
Toledo	Passing	Kalieb Osborne	17–28, 167 yards, TD
Toledo	Rushing	Kalieb Osborne	18 carries, 77 yards
Toledo	Receiving	Junior Vandeross III	7 receptions, 61 yards
Louisville	Passing	Miller Moss	16–24, 153 yards, 2 TD
Louisville	Rushing	Keyjuan Brown	15 carries, 112 yards
Louisville	Receiving	Caullin Lacy	6 receptions, 88 yards

== Awards and honors ==
All-ACC
Player	Position	Team
Chris Bell	WR	First Team
Rene Konga	DT	Second Team
Isaac Brown	RB	Third Team
Caullin Lacy	AP	Third Team
Clev Lubin	DE	Third Team
TJ Quinn	LB	Third Team
Cooper Ranvier	K	Third Team
Caullin Lacy	WR	Honorable Mention
Lance Robinson	OG	Honorable Mention
Pete Nygra	C	Honorable Mention
Antonio Watts	LB	Honorable Mention
Tayon Holloway	CB	Honorable Mention

== Rankings ==
Ranking movements Legend: ██ Increase in ranking ██ Decrease in ranking — = Not ranked RV = Received votes
	Week																
Poll	Pre	1	2	3	4	5	6	7	8	9	10	11	12	13	14	15	Final
AP	RV	RV	RV	RV	RV	RV	RV	—	19	16	14	19	RV	—	RV	RV	RV
Coaches	RV	RV	RV	RV	RV	RV	RV	RV	22	17	15	21	RV	—	RV	RV	RV
CFP	Not released										15	20	—	—	—	—	Not released
