= Chris Bell (wide receiver) =

American football player (born 2004)

No. 18 – Miami Dolphins
- Position: Wide receiver
- Roster status: Active

Personal information
- Born: June 7, 2004 (age 22)
- Listed height: 6 ft 2 in (1.88 m)
- Listed weight: 228 lb (103 kg)

Career information
- High school: Greenville Christian (Greenville, Mississippi)
- College: Louisville (2022–2025)
- NFL draft: 2026: 3rd round, 94th overall pick

Career history
- Miami Dolphins (2026–present)

Awards and highlights
- First-team All-ACC (2025)

Career NFL statistics as of Week 8, 2026
- Receptions: 12
- Receiving yards: 148
- Receiving touchdowns: 0
- Stats at Pro Football Reference

Christopher Bell Jr. (born June 7, 2004) is an American professional football wide receiver for the Miami Dolphins of the National Football League (NFL). He played college football for the Louisville Cardinals and was selected by the Dolphins in the third round of the 2026 NFL draft.

== Early life ==
Bell grew up in Yazoo City, Mississippi and attended Yazoo City High School before transferring to Greenville Christian School in Greenville, Mississippi during his senior season. Coming out of high school, he was rated as a three star recruit, and the 176th overall wide receiver in the class of 2022, where he initially committed to play college football for the Southern Miss Golden Eagles over offer from schools such as Louisiana, Maryland, and Arkansas State. However, after receiving offers from Louisville and Mississippi State, Bell decommitted from the Golden Eagles. Ultimately, he signed to play for the Louisville Cardinals over Mississippi State.

== College career ==
=== 2022 season ===
In his freshman season in 2022, Bell totaled seven receptions for 105 yards.

=== 2023 season ===
During the 2023 season, he played in all 14 games with 11 starts, hauling in 29 passes for 407 yards and two touchdowns.

=== 2024 season ===
In week 12 of the 2024 season, Bell racked up nine receptions for 112 yards and a touchdown, in an upset loss against Stanford. In week 13, he hauled in two passes for 101 yards and a touchdown, in a blowout win versus Pittsburgh. Bell finished the 2024 season, recording 43 receptions for 737 yards and four touchdowns.

=== 2025 season ===
Bell entered the 2025 season as a starter and one of the Cardinal's top players and leaders. He was also named to the preseason all-ACC team. In 11 appearances for the team, Bell recorded 72 receptions for 917 yards and six touchdowns. On November 22, 2025, in a game against SMU, Bell suffered a torn ACL, ending his season.

=== Statistics ===
Year	Team	Games		Receiving				Rushing			
Year	Team	GP	GS	Rec	Yds	Avg	TD	Att	Yds	Avg	TD
2022	Louisville	9	-	7	105	15.0	0	-	-	-	-
2023	Louisville	14	-	29	407	14.0	2	-	-	-	-
2024	Louisville	13	13	43	737	17.1	4	2	43	21.5	0
2025	Louisville	11	11	72	917	12.7	6	-	-	-	-
Career		47	24	151	2,166	14.3	12	2	43	21.5	0

== Professional career ==
Pre-draft measurables
Height	Weight	Arm length	Hand span	Wingspan
6 ft 1 7/8 in (1.88 m)	222 lb (101 kg)	31 3/4 in (0.81 m)	10 in (0.25 m)	6 ft 4 3/4 in (1.95 m)
All values from NFL Combine

Bell was selected by the Miami Dolphins in the third round, 94th overall, of the 2026 NFL draft.
