= Robert Weiner (American football) =

American college football coach

Current position
- Title: Associate head coach, quarterbacks coach
- Team: UConn
- Conference: Independent

Biographical details
- Born: Tampa, Florida, U.S.
- Education: Boston College (1987)

Coaching career (HC unless noted)

Football
- 1989–2003: Jesuit HS (FL) (assistant)
- 2004–2019: Plant HS (FL)
- 2020–2025: Toledo (co-OC / QB])
- 2025: Toledo (interim HC)
- 2026–present: UConn (AHC/QB)

Baseball
- 2003–2004: Crystal River HS (FL)

Head coaching record
- Overall: 0–1 (college football)
- Bowls: 0–1

Accomplishments and honors

Championships
- Football; 4 FHSAA (2006, 2008–2009, 2011)

Robert Weiner is an American football coach. He currently serves as the associate head coach and quarterbacks coach at the University of Connecticut.

== Early life and education ==
Weiner is from Tampa, Florida, and attended Jesuit High School. He then attended Boston College, earning a bachelor's degree in English and secondary education. Weiner never played football; instead, he played on his high school's tennis team.

== Coaching career ==
=== High school ===
Shortly after his graduation from Boston College, Weiner returned to his alma mater, Jesuit High School, to accept a position as an assistant coach for the football, basketball, and baseball teams. He held these positions from 1989 to 2003, when he departed Jesuit for Crystal River High School in Crystal River, Florida. He spent two seasons there before accepting the position of head football coach at Henry B. Plant High School in South Tampa. He served in this position from 2004 to 2019, with remarkable success. In the two seasons before Weiner arrived, Plant suffered through a combined 1–19 record, and the team had not recorded a winning season in the last decade. During Weiner's sixteen seasons as Plant's head coach, the team only recorded two losing seasons – his first and his last. The team went 3–7 under Weiner in his first year, but proceeded to win 14 consecutive district championships, a streak that ended after Plant went 4–6 in 2019, Weiner's last season. During Weiner's time at the helm, Plant won four FHSAA state championships (in 2006, 2008, 2009, and 2011), finished as state runners-up twice, and won a total of 172 games. While coaching at Plant High School, Weiner also taught AP English Literature and Composition. He has stated in interviews that Ulysses is among his favorite works that he studied in college.

Weiner coached several notable athletes during his time at Plant, including future Georgia quarterback Aaron Murray, future Miami and Purdue quarterback Robert Marve, and future South Florida and Arizona quarterback Jordan McCloud.

On January 22, 2013, Weiner announced that he had accepted a position as the wide receivers coach at South Florida, however, he reversed this decision within 48 hours and ended up remaining at Plant. Ultimately, Weiner accepted a position as the co-offensive coordinator and quarterbacks coach at Toledo on January 2, 2020. Weiner had long been linked to potential collegiate jobs; he stated that he had been offered a college coaching job in each of his final seven years at Plant, including one from Toledo that he declined.

==== Suspension ====
On October 2, 2019, Weiner received a six-week suspension for violations of the Florida High School Athletic Association rules regarding athletic recruiting and improper contact with a player that were self-reported by Plant High School. Specifically, Weiner violated the FHSAA's rules against coaches making living arrangements for players, since he made arrangements for a player (who was only practicing with the team and did not play in games) to live with a Plant High School parent after his elderly caretaker was no longer able to look after him. In addition to the six-week suspension, Weiner was also fined $5,000. Following the announcement of the suspension, Weiner defended his actions, saying, "I can also stand here and honestly say, without any question, that we did not violate the educational, athletic spirit and philosophy." Following an appeal, his suspension was reduced to three weeks.

=== College ===
Weiner's first season at Toledo was in 2020. He was rated No. 2 in the Mid-American Conference for class of 2022 recruiting by 247Sports. In 2022, Weiner coached Maxwell Award finalist, Dequan Finn to Toledo's first MAC West Championship since 2017. In December 2025, Weiner was named interim head coach of Toledo for the 2025 Boca Raton Bowl after Jason Candle left the program to become head coach at UConn.

== Personal life ==
Weiner and his longtime girlfriend, Tonya Thomas, maintain houses in Toledo, Ohio, and Tampa, Florida.

== Head coaching record ==
=== College football ===
Year	Team	Overall	Conference	Standing	Bowl/playoffs
Toledo Rockets (Mid-American Conference) (2025)
2025	Toledo	0–1	0–0		L Boca Raton
Toledo:		0–1	0–0		
Total:		0–1			
