= Antonio Watts =

American football player (born 2003)

No. 9 – Louisville Cardinals
- Position: Safety / linebacker
- Class: Senior

Personal information
- Born: February 12, 2003 (age 23)
- Listed height: 6 ft 2 in (1.88 m)
- Listed weight: 225 lb (102 kg)

Career information
- High school: Carver (Columbus, Georgia)
- College: Louisville (2022–present)
- Stats at ESPN

Antonio Watts (born February 12, 2003) is an American college football safety and linebacker for the Louisville Cardinals.

== Earlyl life ==
Watts started playing football at the age of five. "He was always the one who wanted to hit people," said his older brother Antwone. Watts attended George Washington Carver High School in Columbus, Georgia. He teamed up with both of his older brothers on the football team as a freshman in 2018. As a junior, Watts recorded 62 tackles, nine tackles for loss, and three interceptions. As a senior, he posted 104 tackles, seven tackles for loss, four interceptions, three forced fumbles, and 21 pass breakups. Watts garnered first-team All-State Class 4-A honors. He also participated in track and field.

Watts was rated as a three-star recruit by ESPN and 247Sports; these outlets ranked him as the No. 77 and No. 131 safety, respectively, in the class of 2022. He received multiple offers from NCAA Division I programs, including Akron, East Carolina, Eastern Michigan, Kent State, Louisville, South Alabama, and Syracuse. On January 30, 2022, Watts verbally committed to play college football for the Louisville Cardinals. He signed with the team three days later.

== College career ==
As a freshman in 2022, Watts was redshirted. In 2023, he played in 14 games, tallying 30 tackles, six tackles for loss, one sack, and one forced fumble. Heading into the 2024 season, Watts beat out Ben Perry for the starting job at the "STAR" position, a hybrid safety/linebacker role similar to a rover. In the 2024 Sun Bowl, he knocked away the potential game-winning pass on a two-point try in the final seconds to seal the 35-34 win over Washington. Watts started all 13 games that season. He posted 51 tackles, 6.5 tackles for loss, four pass breakups, and one forced fumble.

After a strong performance in fall camp, Watts retained his starting position for the 2025 season while stepping into a bigger leadership role on the team. He recorded 42 tackles, 6.5 tackles for loss, two sacks, three interceptions, three pass breakups, two forced fumbles, and one fumble recovery in 10 games. Watts missed the final three games of the season due to a knee injury suffered against Clemson, which required surgery. He earned All-Atlantic Coast Conference (ACC) honorable mention.

On January 2, 2026, Watts announced his intention to enter the NCAA transfer portal. The following day, he announced that he would instead return to the Cardinals for the 2026 season. Watts missed spring practices while continuing to recover from his knee injury, though he returned for fall camp.

== Personal life ==
Watts is the third-born of four brothers, all of whom played college football. The oldest, AJ, played at Akron, Louisiana–Monroe, and Memphis. The second oldest, Antwone, played at Albany State, Louisiana–Monroe, and Bethune–Cookman, while the youngest, Antavius, plays for Mississippi State as of 2026. Their uncle, Frank Watts, played football at Georgia, while his own son played at Georgia Military College.
