= Greenville Christian School =

Segregation academy in Mississippi

Location
- 2064 GCS Road; Greenville, Mississippi; 33°21′44″N 091°02′17″W

Information
- Type: Private School
- Motto: Training today, tomorrow's Christian leaders.
- Established: August 1969
- Grades: pre-kindergarten - 12
- Enrollment: 216
- Colors: Red, White, and Blue
- Mascot: The Saints
- Affiliation: Mississippi Private School Association
- Website: www.gcssaints.com
- Last updated: 4 December 2017

Greenville Christian School is a private, Christian school located in Greenville, Mississippi that was founded as a segregation academy. Greenville Christian offers preschool through grade 12 education to residents of Greenville and the surrounding areas. The school is accredited by the Southern Association of Colleges and Schools and the Mississippi Association of Independent Schools.

== History ==
Greenville Christian School was established by parents from the Christ Wesleyan Methodist Church as a segregation academy. A 1970 lawsuit sought to force the all-white school to return textbooks received from local public schools at no charge.

The school opened in August 1969, at the Greenville Hotel with thirty-seven students in Grades 1 through 9. In 1972, the school's new facility at Highway 1 south was completed, and classes commenced at the beginning of the school year in the fall. As a result of fast growth, new classrooms were added during the course of the next few years. In 1979, the school was recognized under the governing body of the Greenville Christian School Parents' Association. Since 1983, four new classrooms have been added, an athletic/training building has been constructed and a science complex has been completed.

Over time, the school became integrated and in 2021, its enrollment was 70% African American and top ranked football team had all black players.

Enrollment for the 2020/2021 school year is around 300 with a waiting list. Greenville Christian only accepts a certain number of students per classroom to encourage individual learning time to further help students. .

== Sports and extracurricular activities ==
Greenville Christian has an active Student Council to provide students with the opportunity to participate in the running of the school, along with a chapter of the National Beta Club academic honorary society. The school has competitive teams in American football, basketball, track and cross-country, baseball, girl's fast pitch softball, and soccer.
