= Miller Moss =

American football player (born 2002)

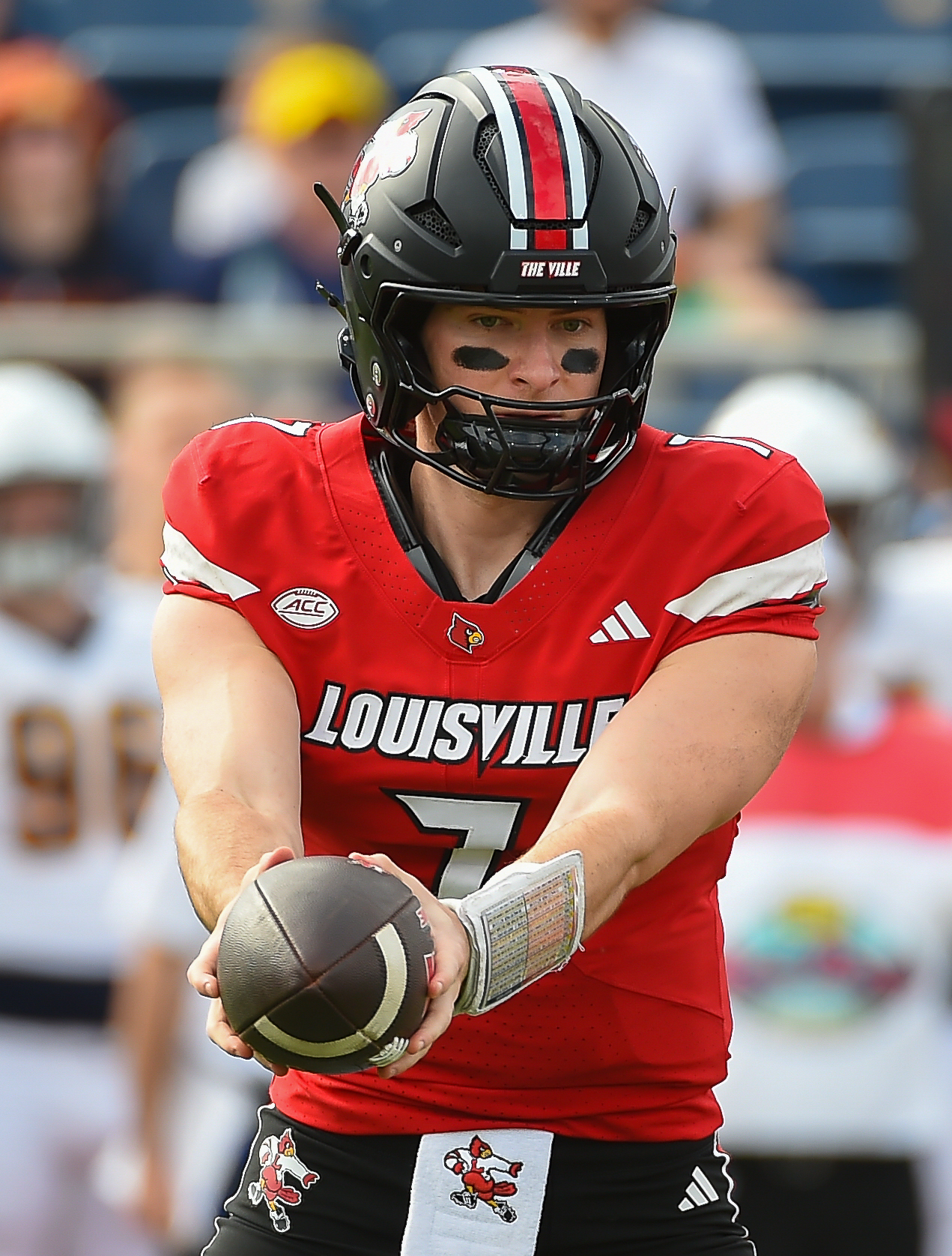
- Moss with the Louisville Cardinals in 2025

No. 16 – Chicago Bears
- Position: Quarterback
- Roster status: Practice squad

Personal information
- Born: March 19, 2002 (age 24); Santa Monica, California, U.S.
- Listed height: 6 ft 1 in (1.85 m)
- Listed weight: 211 lb (96 kg)

Career information
- High school: Bishop Alemany (Mission Hills, California)
- College: USC (2021–2024); Louisville (2025)
- NFL draft: 2026: undrafted

Career history
- Chicago Bears (2026–present)*
- * Offseason or practice squad member only
- Stats at Pro Football Reference

Miller Moss (born March 19, 2002) is an American professional football quarterback for the Chicago Bears of the National Football League (NFL). He played college football for the USC Trojans and Louisville Cardinals and he was signed as an undrafted free agent by the Chicago Bears.

== Early life ==
Moss was born on March 19, 2002, in Santa Monica, California. His father is architect Eric Owen Moss, the founder of Culver City-based Eric Owen Moss Architects. His mother is a managing partner at the firm as well as a former architecture professor at the University of Southern California (USC). Moss attended Loyola High School in Los Angeles, becoming the school's first freshman to start at quarterback. Moss later transferred to Bishop Alemany High School in Mission Hills, California. A four-star prospect, he committed to play college football at the University of Southern California.

== College career ==
=== USC ===
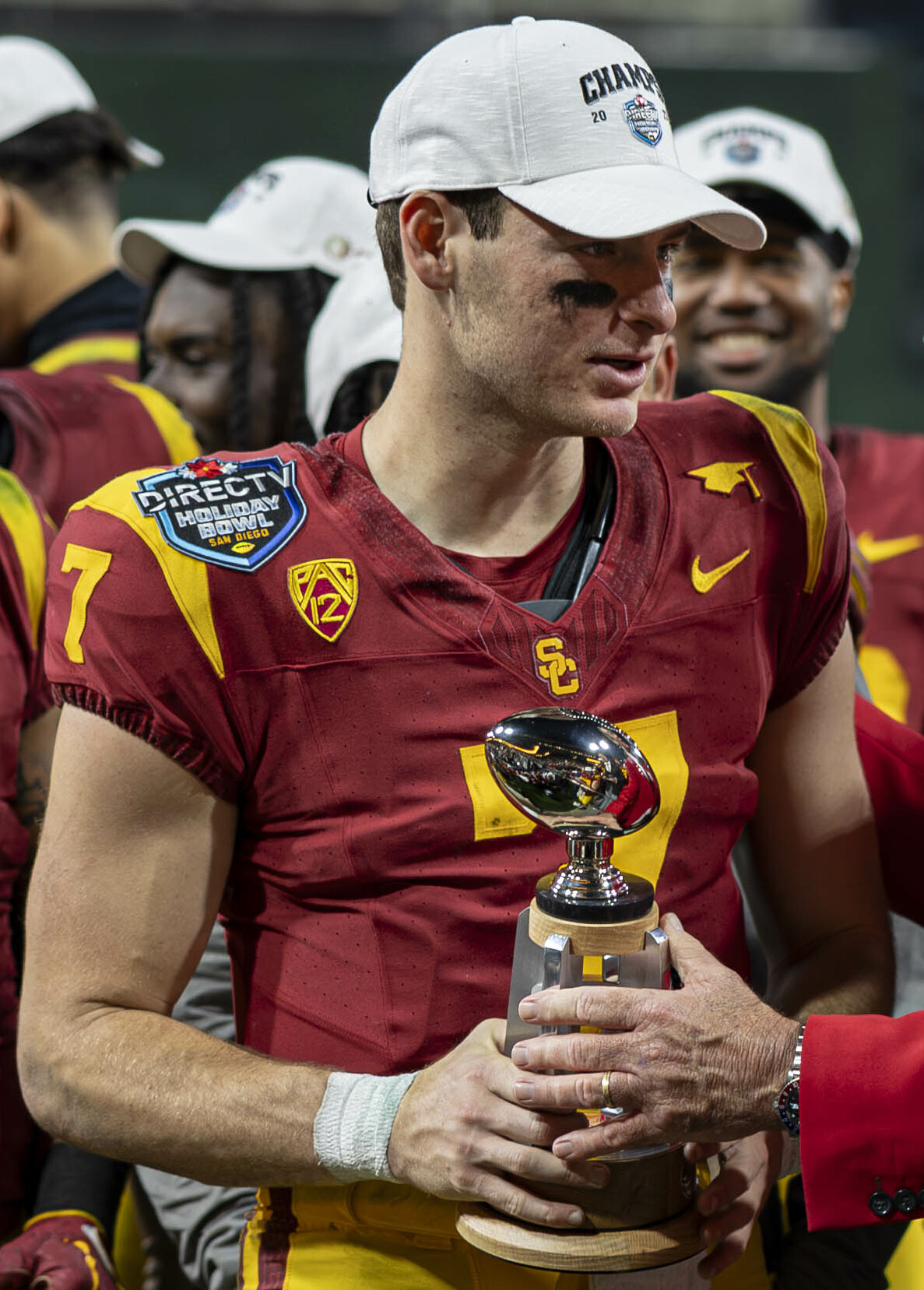
Moss being named Offensive MVP of the 2023 Holiday Bowl.

Moss played in two games his first year at USC in 2021 and took a redshirt. In 2022 and 2023, he was Caleb Williams's backup. After Williams sat out, Moss made his first start in the 2023 Holiday Bowl against Louisville. Moss led the Trojans to a 42–28 win and was named offensive MVP after throwing a Holiday Bowl-record six touchdowns.

Named the starter for the 2024 season, Moss led his team to a Vegas Kickoff Classic win against the LSU Tigers, completing 27 of 36 passes for 378 yards and a touchdown. He started for the first nine games of the season, throwing for 2,555 yards with 18 touchdowns and nine interceptions. He was replaced as starting quarterback by Jayden Maiava following a loss to Washington where Moss threw three picks in a 26-21 loss. He entered the transfer portal at the conclusion of the 2024 regular season.

=== Louisville ===
On December 14, 2024, Moss committed to the Louisville Cardinals. He started all 12 games for Louisville in 2025 and was named the MVP of the 2025 Boca Raton Bowl, in which Moss and Louisville defeated Toledo 27–22.

=== Statistics ===
Season	Team	Games			Passing								Rushing			
Season	Team	GP	GS	Record	Cmp	Att	Pct	Yds	Y/A	TD	Int	Rtg	Att	Yds	Avg	TD
2021	USC	2	0	—	8	13	61.5	74	8.7	1	0	134.7	3	-14	-4.7	0
2022	USC	5	0	—	12	14	85.7	159	11.4	1	0	204.7	3	9	3.0	0
2023	USC	5	1	1–0	46	65	70.8	681	10.5	7	1	191.2	4	32	8.0	2
2024	USC	9	9	4–5	233	362	64.4	2,555	7.1	18	9	135.1	21	-18	-0.9	2
2025	Louisville	12	12	9–3	244	380	64.2	2,679	7.1	16	7	133.6	54	-65	-1.2	9
Career		33	22	14–8	543	834	65.1	6,148	7.4	43	17	140.0	85	-56	-0.7	13

== Professional career ==
Pre-draft measurables
Height	Weight	Arm length	Hand span	Wingspan	Vertical jump	Broad jump
6 ft 1 3/8 in (1.86 m)	211 lb (96 kg)	31 in (0.79 m)	9 3/8 in (0.24 m)	6 ft 1 5/8 in (1.87 m)	32.0 in (0.81 m)	8 ft 7 in (2.62 m)
All values from Pro Day

Moss was signed as an undrafted free agent by the Chicago Bears after the conclusion of the 2026 NFL draft, rejoining his former USC teammate Williams. On August 30, the Bears waived Moss as a part of final roster cuts.

Before the 2026 regular season, he was re-signed to the Bears' practice squad on September 12. Moss was briefly elevated to the active roster for the season opener against the Carolina Panthers while backup quarterback Tyson Bagent was recovering from a back injury.

== Personal life ==
Moss is the son of Los Angeles-based architect Eric Owen Moss and Emily Kovner Moss.
