= Kalieb Osborne =

American football player

No. 7 – UConn Huskies
- Position: Quarterback
- Class: Junior

Personal information
- Listed height: 6 ft 4 in (1.93 m)
- Listed weight: 218 lb (99 kg)

Career information
- High school: Waterford Mott (Waterford, Michigan)
- College: Toledo (2024–2025); UConn (2026–present)
- Stats at ESPN

Kalieb De'Wayne Osborne is an American college football quarterback for the UConn Huskies. He previously played for the Toledo Rockets.

== Early life ==
Osborne attended Waterford Mott High School in Waterford, Michigan. As a senior, he threw for 3,532 yards with 34 touchdowns and rushed for 1,865 yards and 25 touchdowns. He committed to the University of Toledo to play college football.

== College career ==
After redshirting his first year at Toledo in 2024, Osborne played in seven games with one start in 2025, completing 32 of 52 passes for 427 yards and three touchdowns. He made his first career start in the 2025 Boca Raton Bowl. After the season, he entered the transfer portal and committed to the University of Connecticut, where his Toledo coach, Jason Candle, was hired. Osborne was named the starter to open the season. In his first career start he completed 19 of 26 for 265 yards with one two touchdowns and an interception and rushed for 90 yards on eight carries with a touchdown.

=== Statistics ===
Year	Team	Games			Passing								Rushing			
Year	Team	GP	GS	Record	Cmp	Att	Pct	Yds	Y/A	TD	Int	Rtg	Att	Yds	Avg	TD
2024	Toledo	0	0	—	Redshirted (redshirt)											
2025	Toledo	7	1	0–1	32	52	61.5	427	8.2	3	0	149.9	51	282	5.5	2
2026	UConn	8	8	4–4	129	215	60.0	1,857	8.6	14	2	152.2	89	330	3.7	7
Career		15	9	4−5	161	267	60.3	2,284	8.6	17	2	151.7	140	612	4.4	9
