= Keyjuan Brown =

American football player (born 2004)

No. 5 – Louisville Cardinals
- Position: Running back
- Class: Redshirt Junior

Personal information
- Born: September 19, 2004 (age 22)
- Listed height: 5 ft 10 in (1.78 m)
- Listed weight: 215 lb (98 kg)

Career information
- High school: South Atlanta (Atlanta, Georgia)
- College: Louisville (2023–present)
- Stats at ESPN

Keyjuan Brown (born September 19, 2004) is an American college football running back for the Louisville Cardinals.

== Early life ==
Brown attended South Atlanta High School in Atlanta, Georgia. As a junior in 2021, he rushed for a Georgia state leading 2,757 yards and 38 touchdowns. As a senior, he was the 6-2A player of the year after rushing for 2,706 yards and 31 touchdowns. Overall in his career, Brown rushed for 7,476 yards on 800 carries with 84 touchdowns and had 9,013 all-purpose yards and 98 total touchdowns. He committed to the University of Louisville to play college football.

== College career ==
Brown rushed 11 times for 65 yards with a touchdown in his one-game he played his first year at Louisville in 2023 and redshirted. As a redshirt freshman in 2024, he played in 11 games and had 243 rushing yards on 47 carries with three touchdowns. Brown entered the transfer portal after the season and committed to play at Boise State University before ultimately deciding to return to Louisville. He entered 2025 as a backup, but became a starter after injuries to Isaac Brown and Duke Watson. For the season, he rushed for 704 yards on 96 carries with six touchdowns.
