= Isaac Brown (American football) =

American football player (born 2005)

No. 1 – Louisville Cardinals
- Position: Running back
- Class: Junior

Personal information
- Born: March 2, 2005 (age 21)
- Listed height: 5 ft 9 in (1.75 m)
- Listed weight: 190 lb (86 kg)

Career information
- High school: Homestead (Homestead, Florida)
- College: Louisville (2024–present)

Awards and highlights
- ACC Rookie of the Year (2024); ACC Offensive Rookie of the Year (2024); Second-team All-ACC (2024); Third-team All-ACC (2025)
- Stats at ESPN

Isaac Brown (born March 2, 2005) is an American college football running back for the Louisville Cardinals.

== Early life ==
Brown attended Homestead Senior High School in Homestead, Florida. He had 650 rushing yards and 10 touchdowns as a junior and 1,084 yards as a senior. He committed to the University of Louisville to play college football.

College recruiting
Name	Hometown	School	Height	Weight	40^{‡}	Commit date
Isaac Brown; RB	Homestead, Florida, U.S.	Homestead	5 ft 9 in (1.75 m)	190 lb (86 kg)	–	Aug 1, 2022
Isaac Brown; RB	Recruit ratings: Rivals: 247Sports: ESPN: (80)					
Overall recruit ranking: 247Sports: 39 (RB) ESPN: 31 (RB)
Note: In many cases, Scout, Rivals, 247Sports, On3, and ESPN may conflict in their listings of height and weight.; In these cases, the average was taken. ESPN grades are on a 100-point scale.; Sources: "2024 Team Ranking". Rivals.com.

== College career ==
=== 2024 season ===
In his first game as a true freshman at Louisville, Brown rushed for 123 yards on five carries with a touchdown. He rushed for 1,173 yards, becoming the first true freshman in program history to rush for over 1,000 yards. He led the ACC with 7.1 yards per carry and finished third in rushing yards.

He was named ACC Rookie of the Year and ACC Offensive Rookie of the Year. Brown also received second-team All-ACC honors.

=== 2025 season ===
Brown entered the 2025 season as the starting running back for the Cardinals.

=== Statistics ===
Legend
	Led the FBS
**Bold**	Career high

Year	Team	Games		Rushing				Receiving			
Year	Team	GP	GS	Att	Yds	Avg	TD	Rec	Yds	Avg	TD
2024	Louisvile	13	9	165	1,173	7.1	11	30	152	5.1	1
2025	Louisville	9	8	101	884	8.8	7	13	48	3.7	0
Career		22	17	266	1,955	7.7	18	42	200	4.7	1
