= Caullin Lacy =

American football player (born 2001)

Profile
- Positions: Wide receiver, return specialist

Personal information
- Born: December 22, 2001 (age 24); Mobile, Alabama, U.S.
- Listed height: 5 ft 9 in (1.75 m)
- Listed weight: 183 lb (83 kg)

Career information
- High school: Faith (Mobile, Alabama)
- College: South Alabama (2020–2023); Louisville (2024–2025)
- NFL draft: 2026: undrafted

Career history
- New York Jets (2026)*
- * Offseason or practice squad member only

Awards and highlights
- First-team All-Sun Belt (2023); Third-team All-ACC (2025)
- Stats at Pro Football Reference

Caullin Stefan Lacy (born December 22, 2001) is an American professional football wide receiver. He played college football for the South Alabama Jaguars and Louisville Cardinals.

== Early life ==
Lacy grew up in Mobile, Alabama and attended Faith Academy where he lettered in football, basketball and track. At Faith Academy, he helped the football team win their first state championship as an AHSAA team during his senior year in 2019 finishing the game with 155 yards and 33 carries.

== College career ==
=== South Alabama (2020–2022) ===
Lacy appeared in all 11 games during his true freshman season in 2020. He started in the annual Battle for the Belt rivalry game against Troy ending the season with completing 98 yards on 11 receptions. During the 2021 season, he played in 11 games and started 6 ending the season with completing 291 yards on 41 receptions. During the 2022 season, he played and started in 13 games finishing the season with 65 receptions for 816 yards and 6 touchdowns. On Week 4, Lacy was named the Sun Belt Special Teams Player of the Week after his performance against Louisiana Tech where he completed 57 returning yards and also hauled three passes for 40 yards and a touchdown.

On December 1, 2023, Lacy announced that he would be entering the transfer portal.

=== Louisville (2024–2025) ===
On December 17, 2023, Lacy announced that he would be transferring to Louisville.

=== Statistics ===
Year	Team	Games		Receiving				Rushing				Kick returns				Punt returns			
Year	Team	GP	GS	Rec	Yds	Avg	TD	Att	Yds	Avg	TD	Ret	Yds	Avg	TD	Ret	Yds	Avg	TD
2020	South Alabama	11	1	11	98	8.9	0	20	112	5.6	0	6	105	17.5	0	3	3	1.0	0
2021	South Alabama	11	6	41	291	7.1	0	10	26	2.6	0	4	87	21.8	0	9	50	5.6	0
2022	South Alabama	13	9	64	812	12.7	6	1	2	2.0	0	5	157	31.4	0	22	184	8.4	1
2023	South Alabama	12	12	91	1,316	14.5	7	—	—	—	—	2	40	20.0	0	21	210	10.0	0
2024	Louisvile	5	3	18	196	10.9	1	5	21	4.2	1	5	191	38.2	1	6	35	5.8	0
2025	Louisville	13	12	60	635	10.6	2	15	53	3.5	0	12	251	20.9	0	25	454	18.2	2
Career		65	43	285	3,348	11.7	16	51	214	4.2	1	34	831	24.4	1	86	936	10.9	3

== Professional career ==
Pre-draft measurables
Height	Weight	Arm length	Hand span	Wingspan	40-yard dash	10-yard split	20-yard split	Vertical jump	Broad jump
5 ft 9 1/8 in (1.76 m)	183 lb (83 kg)	29 3/8 in (0.75 m)	9 7/8 in (0.25 m)	6 ft 2 1/4 in (1.89 m)	4.55 s	1.59 s	2.66 s	33.5 in (0.85 m)	9 ft 8 in (2.95 m)
All values from NFL Combine

On May 8, 2026, Lacy signed with the New York Jets as an undrafted free agent. He was waived/injured by New York on August 23. He was placed on injured reserve on August 24 and waived with an injury settlement four days later.
