= Ashley Stroehlein =

American sports anchor

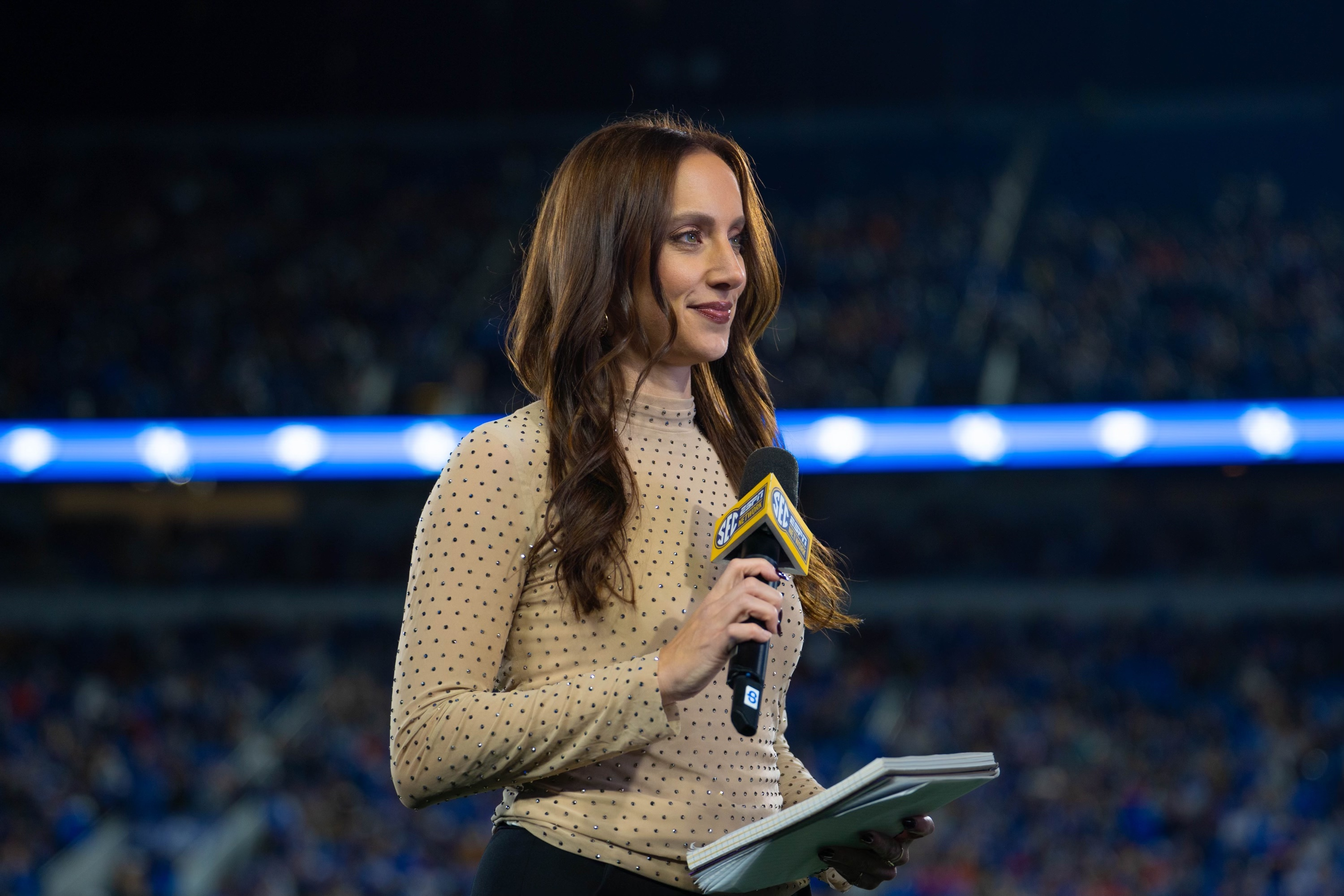
- Born: Ashley Nicole Stroehlein; Tazewell, Virginia
- Education: Radford University
- Occupations: Sideline reporter, sports journalist
- Employer(s): ESPN, SiriusXM, Space City Home Network

Ashley Stroehlein was a sideline reporter for ESPN's college football coverage, now a sideline reporter for the Houston Rockets on Space City Home Network, and host on SiriusXM's sports platforms. She previously worked as a sideline reporter for NFL Network's coverage of Conference USA in 2019, a host and reporter for Bristol Motor Speedway's NASCAR coverage and an in-game host for the Charlotte Checkers and Charlotte Knights. Stroehlein is also a former sports anchor and reporter for NBC Charlotte and WBTV.

== Early life and college ==
Stroehlein is a native of Council, Virginia. She is a former Virginia High School League Scholar/Athlete of the Year, Wendy's Heisman Finalist, WJHL Female Student/Athlete of the Year, earned All-District Honors in Basketball, Volleyball, Softball, Track, and Cross Country. Stroehlein graduated valedictorian of her class and attended Radford University on an academic scholarship. During her time at Radford she worked in athletics, played intramurals, and went on to graduate with honors, majoring in Mathematics.

== Career ==
After graduation she moved to North Carolina to coach basketball and track, while teaching secondary math at Statesville High School and Hough High School. During this time, she went to the Connecticut School of Broadcasting - Charlotte campus to study broadcasting. Upon completion of her courses at CTSB, Stroehlein was hired as a news editor for WBTV. Shortly later she moved into the role of part-time sports reporter, before being hired full-time as an on-air sports anchor. Stroehlein was there for five years before joining WCNC. She also started reporting as a sideline reporter for college football for national networks in 2019, first with the NFL Network and then ESPN in 2022 to 2025.

Stroehlein also worked as a freelance reporter for Bristol Motor Speedway during the track's NASCAR Truck, Xfinity and Cup Series races.

Previously, Stroehlein worked for CBS Radio's KISS 95.1 as a morning show producer and as an entertainment reporter for K 104.7, as well as an in game host for the Charlotte Knights and Charlotte Checkers.

In 2026, she replaced Vanessa Richardson covering the Houston Rockets for Space City Home Network. The previous two years, Stroehlein cover the Charlotte Hornets.
