= 2025 Syracuse Orange football team =

American college football season

2025 Syracuse Orange football
- Conference: Atlantic Coast Conference
- Record: 3–9 (1–7 ACC)
- Head coach: Fran Brown (2nd season)
- Offensive coordinator: Jeff Nixon (2nd season)
- Co-offensive coordinator: Mike Johnson (4th season)
- Offensive scheme: Spread
- Defensive coordinator: Elijah Robinson (2nd season)
- Co-defensive coordinator: Robert Wright (2nd season)
- Base defense: Multiple 4–2–5
- Home stadium: JMA Wireless Dome

Uniform
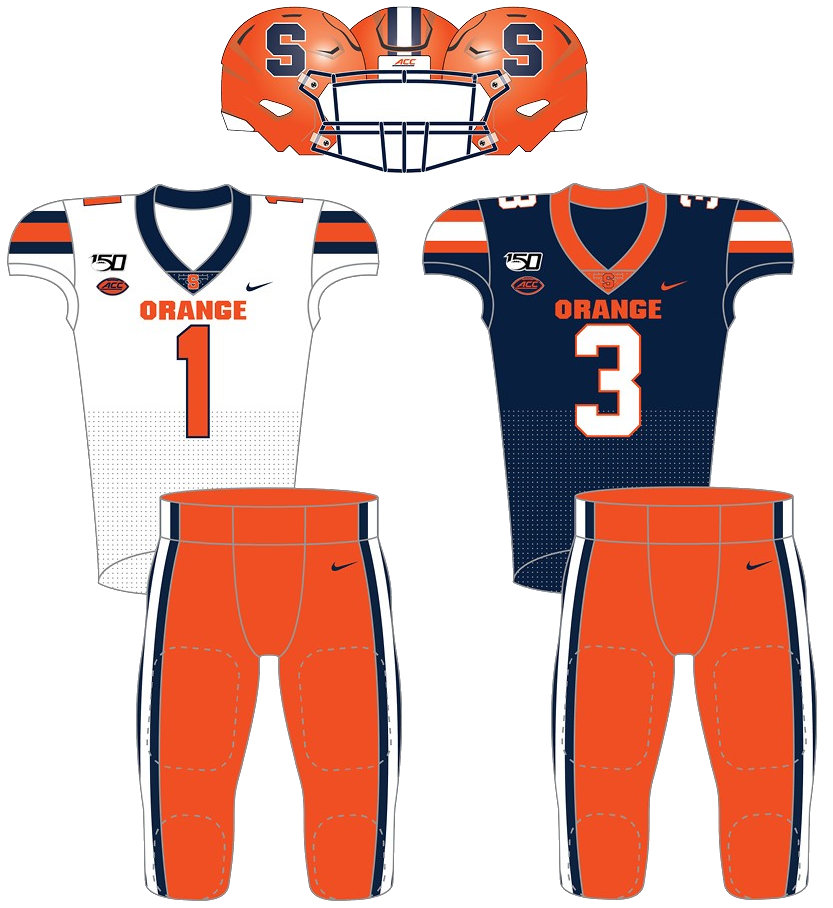

2025 Atlantic Coast Conference football standings
	Conf.			Overall
Team	W		L	W		L
No. 16 Virginia y	7	–	1	11	–	3
Duke y$	6	–	2	9	–	5
No. 2 Miami (FL) ^	6	–	2	13	–	3
Georgia Tech	6	–	2	9	–	4
SMU	6	–	2	9	–	4
Pittsburgh	6	–	2	8	–	5
Louisville	4	–	4	9	–	4
Wake Forest	4	–	4	9	–	4
NC State	4	–	4	8	–	5
California	4	–	4	7	–	6
Clemson	4	–	4	7	–	6
Stanford	3	–	5	4	–	8
Florida State	2	–	6	5	–	7
Virginia Tech	2	–	6	3	–	9
North Carolina	2	–	6	4	–	8
Boston College	1	–	7	2	–	10
Syracuse	1	–	7	3	–	9
Championship: Duke 27, Virginia 20^{OT}
^ – College Football Playoff participant; $ – Conference champion; y – Championship game participant; As of October 15, 2026; Rankings from AP Poll

The 2025 Syracuse Orange football team represented Syracuse University as a member of the Atlantic Coast Conference (ACC) during the 2025 NCAA Division I FBS football season. The Orange played their home games at the JMA Wireless Dome located in Syracuse, New York. They were led by second-year head coach Fran Brown. The Orange were in their 124th season overall and their 13th as a member of the ACC. Though they started the season 3–1, the Orange would end the season on a 8 game losing streak finishing last in conference play. This was mainly due to starting quarterback Steve Angeli tearing his Achilles during the in-conference game versus Clemson where they upset the Tigers 34–21.

The Syracuse Orange drew an average home attendance of 38,605.

== Offseason ==
=== Recruiting ===
Syracuse's 2025 class consisted of 35 signees. The class was ranked 11th in the ACC and 41st nationally by the 247Sports Composite.

=== Players leaving for NFL ===
==== NFL draftees ====
Round	Pick	Player	Position	NFL club
5	165	Oronde Gadsden II	TE	Los Angeles Chargers
6	181	Kyle McCord	QB	Philadelphia Eagles
7	236	LeQuint Allen	RB	Jacksonville Jaguars
7	254	Fadil Diggs	DE	New Orleans Saints

==== Undrafted free agents ====
Player	Position	NFL club
Justin Barron	S	Dallas Cowboys
Tom Callahan	LS	Las Vegas Raiders
Alijah Clark	DB	Dallas Cowboys
Clarence Lewis	DB	Tennessee Titans
Maximilian Mang	TE	Indianapolis Colts
Jackson Meeks	WR	Detroit Lions
Savion Washington	OT	Los Angeles Chargers
Marlowe Wax	LB	Los Angeles Chargers

== Schedule ==
Date	Time	Opponent	Site	TV	Result	Attendance
August 30	12:00 p.m.	vs. No. 24 Tennessee*	Mercedes-Benz Stadium; Atlanta, GA (Aflac Kickoff Game)	ABC	L 26–45	45,918
September 6	12:00 p.m.	UConn*	JMA Wireless Dome; Syracuse, NY (rivalry)	ACCNX/ESPN+	W 27–20 ^{OT}	39,391
September 12	7:00 p.m.	Colgate*	JMA Wireless Dome; Syracuse, NY (rivalry)	ACCN	W 66–24	37,372
September 20	12:00 p.m.	at Clemson	Memorial Stadium; Clemson, SC	ESPN	W 34–21	80,225
September 27	12:00 p.m.	Duke	JMA Wireless Dome; Syracuse, NY	ACCN	L 3–38	44,451
October 4	3:30 p.m.	at SMU	Gerald J. Ford Stadium; Dallas, TX	ACCN	L 18–31	34,845
October 18	7:30 p.m.	Pittsburgh	JMA Wireless Dome; Syracuse, NY (rivalry)	ACCN	L 13–30	40,772
October 25	12:00 p.m.	at No. 7 Georgia Tech	Bobby Dodd Stadium; Atlanta, GA	ESPN2	L 16–41	51,913
October 31	7:30 p.m.	North Carolina	JMA Wireless Dome; Syracuse, NY	ESPN	L 10–27	37,184
November 8	3:30 p.m.	at No. 18 Miami (FL)	Hard Rock Stadium; Miami Gardens, FL	ESPN	L 10–38	60,337
November 22	3:30 p.m.	at No. 9 Notre Dame*	Notre Dame Stadium; Notre Dame, IN	NBC	L 7–70	77,622
November 29	3:00 p.m.	Boston College	JMA Wireless Dome; Syracuse, NY	The CW	L 12–34	32,457
*Non-conference game; Rankings from AP Poll (and CFP Rankings, after November 4) – Released prior to game; All times are in Eastern time

== Game summaries ==
=== vs. No. 24 Tennessee ===
Syracuse Orange (0–0) vs. No. 24 Tennessee Volunteers (0–0) – Game summary

Quarter	1	2	3	4	Total
Orange	0	14	6	6	26
No. 24 Volunteers	17	14	7	7	45

at Mercedes-Benz Stadium • Atlanta, Georgia

- Date: August 30
- Game time: 12:00 p.m.
- Game weather:
- Game attendance: 45,918
- Referee: Ron Snodgrass
- TV announcers (ABC): Bob Wischusen (play-by-play), Louis Riddick (analyst), and Kris Budden (sideline)

Game information

First quarter

- TENN – Max Gilbert 34-yard field goal, 12:46. Volunteers 3–0. Drive: 9 plays, 59 yards, 2:14.
- TENN – Peyton Lewis 2-yard run (Max Gilbert kick), 6:02. Volunteers 10–0. Drive: 12 plays, 85 yards, 3:35.
- TENN – Colton Hood 22-yard fumble return (Max Gilbert kick), 0:56. Volunteers 17–0.

Second quarter

- SYR – Yasin Willis 2-yard run (Tripp Woody kick), 11:40. Volunteers 17–7. Drive: 11 plays, 75 yards, 4:16.
- TENN – Braylon Staley 73-yard pass from Joey Aguilar (Max Gilbert kick), 11:14. Volunteers 24–7. Drive: 2 plays, 75 yards, 0:26.
- SYR – Johntay Cook II 3-yard pass from Steve Angeli (Tripp Woody kick), 1:55. Volunteers 24–14. Drive: 9 plays, 49 yards, 3:38.
- TENN – DeSean Bishop 1-yard run (Max Gilbert kick), 0:21. Volunteers 31–14. Drive: 6 plays, 75 yards, 1:34.

Third quarter

- TENN – Star Thomas 7-yard pass from Joey Aguilar (Max Gilbert kick), 12:22. Volunteers 38–14. Drive: 7 plays, 17 yards, 2:27.
- SYR – Yasin Willis 1-yard run (pass failed), 7:33. Volunteers 38–20. Drive: 12 plays, 75 yards, 4:49.

Fourth quarter

- SYR – Yasin Willis 1-yard run (run failed), 11:54. Volunteers 38–26. Drive: 14 plays, 88 yards, 5:19.
- TENN – Miles Kitselman 2-yard pass from Joey Aguilar (Max Gilbert kick), 3:57. Volunteers 45–26. Drive: 9 plays, 54 yards, 4:42.

Statistics	SYR	TENN
First downs	24	22
Plays–yards	84–377	67–495
Rushes–yards	44–103	39–248
Passing yards	274	247
Passing: comp–att–int	23–40–1	16–28–0
Turnovers	2	1
Time of possession	34:31	25:29

Team	Category	Player	Statistics
Syracuse	Passing	Steve Angeli	23/40, 274 yards, TD, INT
Syracuse	Rushing	Yasin Willis	23 carries, 91 yards, 3 TD
Syracuse	Receiving	Dan Villari	5 receptions, 55 yards
Tennessee	Passing	Joey Aguilar	16/28, 247 yards, 3 TD
Tennessee	Rushing	Star Thomas	12 carries, 92 yards
Tennessee	Receiving	Braylon Staley	4 receptions, 95 yards, TD

=== vs UConn (rivalry) ===
UConn Huskies (1–0) at Syracuse Orange (0–1) – Game summary

Quarter	1	2	3	4	OT	Total
Huskies	0	14	3	3	0	20
Orange	0	6	0	14	7	27

at JMA Wireless Dome • Syracuse, New York

- Date: September 6
- Game time: 12:00 p.m.
- Game weather: Indoors
- Game attendance: 39,391
- Referee: Gary Patterson
- TV announcers (ACCNX/ESPN+): Bill Spaulding (play-by-play) and Craig Haubert (analyst)

Game information

First quarter

- No scoring plays.

Second quarter

- CONN – Alex Honig 15-yard pass from John Neider (Chris Freeman kick), 14:55. Huskies 7–0. Drive: 10 plays, 60 yards, 04:56.
- SYR – Tripp Woody 38-yard field goal, 3:37. Huskies 7–3. Drive: 4 plays, −1 yards, 00:55.
- CONN – Mel Brown 45-yard run (Chris Freeman kick), 1:02. Huskies 14–3. Drive: 6 plays, 77 yards, 02:29.
- SYR – Tripp Woody 32-yard field goal, 0:00. Huskies 14–6. Drive: 8 plays, 61 yards, 01:02.

Third quarter

- CONN – Chris Freeman 35-yard field goal, 9:55. Huskies 17–6. Drive: 10 plays, 73 yards, 05:02.

Fourth quarter

- SYR – Justus Ross-Simmons 53-yard pass from Steve Angeli (pass failed), 5:41. Huskies 17–12. Drive: 7 plays, 90 yards, 01:34.
- SYR – Yasin Willis 3-yard run (Darrell Gill Jr.–Steve Angeli pass), 0:48. Orange 20–17. Drive: 10 plays, 80 yards, 01:18.
- CONN – Chris Freeman 41-yard field goal, 0:01. Tied 20–20. Drive: 8 plays, 52 yards, 00:47.

Overtime

- SYR – Justus Ross-Simmons 6-yard pass from Steve Angeli (Tripp Woody kick). Orange 27–20. Drive: 5 plays, 25 yards.

Statistics	CONN	SYR
First downs	20	24
Plays–yards	82–461	78–416
Rushes–yards	28–45	34–142
Passing yards	274	417
Passing: Comp–Att–Int	25–44–0	33–53–1
Turnovers	0	2
Time of possession	33:34	26:26

Team	Category	Player	Statistics
UConn	Passing	Joe Fagnano	24/43, 259 yards
UConn	Rushing	Cam Edwards	21 carries, 75 yards
UConn	Receiving	Skyler Bell	11 receptions, 105 yards
Syracuse	Passing	Steve Angeli	33/53, 417 yards, 2 TD
Syracuse	Rushing	Yasin Willis	11 carries, 48 yards, TD
Syracuse	Receiving	Dan Villari	7 receptions, 104 yards

=== vs Colgate (FCS, rivalry) ===
Colgate Raiders (FCS) (0–2) at Syracuse Orange (1–1) – Game summary

Quarter	1	2	3	4	Total
Raiders (FCS)	3	0	14	7	24
Orange	14	24	7	21	66

at JMA Wireless Dome • Syracuse, New York

- Date: September 12
- Game time: 7:00 p.m.
- Game weather: Indoor
- Game attendance: 37,372
- Referee: Rory Bernard
- TV announcers (ACCN): Doug Sherman (play-by-play) and Forrest Conoly (analyst)

Game information

First quarter

- (10:30) SYR – Justus Ross-Simmons 26-yard pass from Steve Angeli, Tripp Woody kick (Drive: 7 plays, 65 yards, 2:29; Syracuse 7–0)
- (5:48) COL – Luke Volger 39-yard field goal (Drive: 6 plays, 20 yards, 2:24; Syracuse 7–3)
- (2:12) SYR – Darrell Gill Jr. 43-yard pass from Steve Angeli, Tripp Woody kick (Drive: 9 plays, 83 yards, 3:32; Syracuse 14–3)

Second quarter

- (14:00) SYR – Will Nixon 2-yard run, Tripp Woody kick (Drive: 5 plays, 36 yards, 2:18; Syracuse 21–3)
- (10:06) SYR – Tripp Woody 22-yard field goal (Drive: 5 plays, 49 yards, 1:16; Syracuse 24–3)
- (6:50) SYR – Darrell Gill Jr. 35-yard pass from Steve Angeli, Tripp Woody kick (Drive: 6 plays, 60 yards, 2:22; Syracuse 31–3)
- (1:43) SYR – Jaylan Hornsby 25-yard pass from Steve Angeli, Tripp Woody kick (Drive: 6 plays, 80 yards, 2:06; Syracuse 38–3)

Third quarter

- (9:13) SYR – Darien Williams 26-yard pass from Steve Angeli, Tripp Woody kick (Drive: 3 plays, 26 yards, 0:14; Syracuse 45–3)
- (4:36) COL – Reed Swanson 12-yard pass from Jake Stearney, Luke Vogeler kick (Drive: 11 plays, 90 yards, 4:31; Syracuse 45–10)
- (0:00) COL – Reed Swanson 23-yard pass from Jake Stearney, Luke Vogeler kick (Drive: 8 plays, 58 yards, 2:58; Syracuse 45–17)

Fourth quarter

- (11:03) SYR – Steve Angeli 1-yard run, Tripp Woody kick (Drive: 9 plays, 71 yards, 3:51; Syracuse 52–17)
- (9:27) COL – Cole Fulton 44-yard run, Luke Vogeler kick (Drive: 5 plays, 75 yards, 1:36; Syracuse 52–24)
- (6:26) SYR – Gabe Daniels 12-yard pass from Rickie Collins, Tripp Woody kick (Drive: 7 plays, 93 yards, 2:52; Syracuse 59–24)
- (4:54) SYR – Luke Carney 9-yard run, Tripp Woody kick (Drive: 2 plays, 13 yards, 0:23; Syracuse 66–24)

Statistics	COLG	SYR
First downs	25	32
Plays–yards	83–408	72–610
Rushes–yards	29–107	35–173
Passing yards	301	447
Passing: comp–att–int	30–54–2	27–37–1
Turnovers	3	2
Time of possession	33:21	26:39

Team	Category	Player	Statistics
Colgate	Passing	Jake Stearney	14/20, 148 yards, 2 TD
Colgate	Rushing	Cole Fulton	7 carries, 72 yards, TD
Colgate	Receiving	Reed Swanson	7 receptions, 110 yards, 2 TD
Syracuse	Passing	Steve Angeli	23/31, 382 yards, 5 TD
Syracuse	Rushing	Will Nixon	12 carries, 66 yards, TD
Syracuse	Receiving	Darrell Gill Jr.	6 receptions, 152 yards, 2 TD

=== at Clemson ===
Syracuse Orange (2–1) at Clemson Tigers (1–2) – Game summary

Quarter	1	2	3	4	Total
Orange	10	14	10	0	34
Tigers	7	7	0	7	21

at Memorial Stadium • Clemson, South Carolina

- Date: September 20
- Game time: 12:00 p.m.
- Game weather: Temperature: 82 °F (28 °C) • Wind: NE 2 mph • Weather: Sunny
- Game attendance: 80,225
- Referee: Mike Roche
- TV announcers (ESPN): Bob Wischusen (play-by-play), Louis Riddick (analyst), and Kris Budden (sideline)

Game information

First quarter

- (11:01) SYR – Justus Ross-Simmons 12-yard pass from Steve Angeli, Tripp Woody kick (Drive: 7 plays, 75 yards, 3:59; SYR 7–0)
- (07:40) SYR – Tripp Woody 23-yard field goal (Drive: 11 plays, 49 yards, 3:20; SYR 10–0)
- (03:21) CLEM – Bryant Wesco Jr. 38-yard pass from Cade Klubnik, Nolan Hauser kick (Drive: 9 plays, 75 yards, 4:19; SYR 10–7)

Second quarter

- (14:56) SYR – Will Nixon 9-yard run, Tripp Woody kick (Drive: 9 plays, 75 yards, 3:25; SYR 17–7)
- (09:13) SYR – Darrell Gill Jr. 22-yard pass from Steve Angeli, Tripp Woody kick (Drive: 8 plays, 80 yards, 3:39; SYR 24–7)
- (01:06) CLEM – Adam Randall 6-yard pass from Cade Klubnik, Nolan Hauser kick (Drive: 13 plays, 92 yards, 4:06; SYR 24–14)

Third quarter

- (11:42) SYR – Tripp Woody 49-yard field goal (Drive: 6 plays, 58 yards, 1:20; SYR 27–14)
- (02:12) SYR – Justus Ross-Simmons 18-yard pass from Rickie Collins, Tripp Woody kick (Drive: 1 plays, 18 yards, 0:06; SYR 34–14)

Fourth quarter

- (09:00) CLEM – Bryant Wesco Jr. 9-yard pass from Cade Klubnik, Nolan Hauser kick (Drive: 9 plays, 81 yards, 3:09; SYR 34–21)

Statistics	SYR	CLEM
First downs	24	29
Plays–yards	77–433	83–503
Rushes–yards	38–155	22–140
Passing yards	278	363
Passing: comp–att–int	21–39–0	37–61–1
Turnovers	0	1
Time of possession	30:40	29:20

Team	Category	Player	Statistics
Syracuse	Passing	Steve Angeli	18/31, 344 yards, 2 TD
Syracuse	Rushing	Yasin Willis	18 carries, 94 yards
Syracuse	Receiving	Johntay Cook II	6 receptions, 113 yards
Clemson	Passing	Cade Klubnik	37/60, 363 yards, 3 TD, INT
Clemson	Rushing	Adam Randall	16 carries, 130 yards
Clemson	Receiving	T. J. Moore	8 receptions, 92 yards

=== vs Duke ===
Duke Blue Devils (2–2) at Syracuse Orange (3–1) – Game summary

Quarter	1	2	3	4	Total
Blue Devils	10	14	7	7	38
Orange	3	0	0	0	3

at JMA Wireless Dome • Syracuse, New York

- Date: September 27
- Game time: 12:00 p.m.
- Game weather: None (played indoors)
- Game attendance: 44,451
- Referee: Adam Savoie
- TV announcers (ACCN): Wes Durham (play-by-play), Steve Addazio (analyst), and Dana Boyle (sideline)

Game information

First quarter

- (9:42) DUKE – Todd Pelino 22-yard field goal (Drive: 7 plays, 40 yards, 3:50; Duke 3–0)
- (4:10) SYR – Tripp Woody 29-yard field goal (Drive: 11 plays, 64 yards, 5:32; 3–3)
- (3:12) DUKE – Nate Sheppard 49-yard run, Todd Pelino kick (Drive: 4 plays, 75 yards, 0:58; Duke 10–3)

Second quarter

- (12:01) DUKE – Cooper Barkate 34-yard pass from Darian Mensah, Todd Pelino kick (Drive: 3 plays, 61 yards, 0:48; Duke 17–3)
- (1:55) DUKE – Cooper Barkate 12-yard pass from Darian Mensah, Todd Pelino kick (Drive: 12 plays, 68 yards, 5:24; Duke 24–3)

Third quarter

- (5:34) DUKE – Nate Sheppard 12-yard run, Todd Pelino kick (Drive: 7 plays, 60 yards, 3:14; Duke 31–3)

Fourth quarter

- (11:04) DUKE – Anderson Castle 13-yard run, Todd Pelino kick (Drive: 9 plays, 71 yards, 5:33; Duke 38–3)

Statistics	DUKE	SYR
First downs	23	19
Plays–yards	59–503	51–314
Rushes–yards	37–235	27–85
Passing yards	268	229
Passing: comp–att–int	22–28–0	24–37–1
Turnovers	0	3
Time of possession	31:15	28:45

Team	Category	Player	Statistics
Duke	Passing	Darian Mensah	22/28, 268 yards, 2 TD
Duke	Rushing	Nate Sheppard	15 carries, 168 yards, 2 TD
Duke	Receiving	Cooper Barkate	4 receptions, 72 yards, 2 TD
Syracuse	Passing	Rickie Collins	24/37, 229 yards, INT
Syracuse	Rushing	Yasin Willis	11 carries, 63 yards
Syracuse	Receiving	Johntay Cook	6 receptions, 74 yards

=== at SMU ===
Syracuse Orange (3–2) at SMU Mustangs (2–2) – Game summary

Quarter	1	2	3	4	Total
Orange	0	3	0	15	18
Mustangs	3	21	0	7	31

at Gerald J. Ford Stadium • Dallas, Texas

- Date: October 4
- Game time: 3:30 p.m.
- Game weather: Sunny, 89 degrees
- Game attendance: 34,845
- Referee: Mike Roche
- TV announcers (ACCN): Wes Durham (play-by-play), Steve Addazio (analyst), and Dana Boyle (sideline)

Game information

First quarter

- SMU – Sam Keltner 26-yard field goal, 2:34. Mustangs 3–0. Drive: 4 plays, 4 yards, 1:12.

Second quarter

- SMU – Yamir Knight 15-yard pass from Kevin Jennings (Sam Keltner kick), 12:58. Mustangs 10–0. Drive: 7 plays, 78 yards, 2:43.
- SMU – RJ Maryland 16-yard pass from Kevin Jennings (Sam Keltner kick), 8:02. Mustangs 17–0. Drive: 3 plays, 40 yards, 1:20.
- SMU – Derrick McFall 14-yard pass from Kevin Jennings (Sam Keltner kick), 2:18. Mustangs 24–0. Drive: 6 plays, 90 yards, 2:18.
- SYR – Tripp Woody 38-yard field goal, 0:00. Mustangs 24–3. Drive: 11 plays, 62 yards, 2:13.

Third quarter

- No scoring plays.

Fourth quarter

- SMU – Jordan Hudson 9-yard pass from Kevin Jennings (Sam Keltner kick), 12:37. Mustangs 31–3. Drive: 9 plays, 77 yards, 3:30.
- SYR – Rickie Collins 6-yard run (Tripp Woody kick), 9:59. Mustangs 31–10. Drive: 8 plays, 75 yards, 2:38.
- SYR – David Omopariola safety, 8:55. Mustangs 31–12.
- SYR – Johntay Cook 11-yard pass from Rickie Collins (run failed), 5:20. Mustangs 31–18. Drive: 8 plays, 62 yards, 3:29.

Statistics	SYR	SMU
First downs	18	21
Plays–yards	78–389	64–370
Rushes–yards	33–110	28–76
Passing yards	279	294
Passing: comp–att–int	22–45–3	30–36–1
Turnovers	3	1
Time of possession	31:25	28:35

Team	Category	Player	Statistics
Syracuse	Passing	Rickie Collins	22/45, 279 yards, TD, 3 INT
Syracuse	Rushing	Rickie Collins	10 carries, 57 yards, TD
Syracuse	Receiving	Johntay Cook	7 receptions, 82 yards, TD
SMU	Passing	Kevin Jennings	29/35, 285 yards, 4 TD, INT
SMU	Rushing	TJ Harden	16 carries, 67 yards
SMU	Receiving	Romello Brinson	7 receptions, 71 yards

=== vs Pittsburgh (rivalry) ===
Pittsburgh Panthers (4–2) at Syracuse Orange (3–3) – Game summary

Quarter	1	2	3	4	Total
Panthers	7	10	3	10	30
Orange	7	0	0	6	13

at JMA Wireless Dome • Syracuse, New York

- Date: October 18
- Game time: 7:30 p.m.
- Game weather: Indoor
- Game attendance: 40,772
- Referee: Tim Hedgepath
- TV announcers (ACCN): Chris Cotter (play-by-play), Max Browne (analyst), and Kendra Douglas (sideline)

Game information

First quarter

- (11:49) PITT – Mason Heintschel 36-yard run, Trey Butkowski kick (Drive: 3 plays, 37 yards, 1:55; Pittsburgh 7–0)
- (2:08) SYR – Darrell Gill Jr. 11-yard pass from Rickie Collins, Tripp Woody kick (Drive: 2 plays, 12 yards, 0:52; Tied 7–7)

Second quarter

- (11:00) PITT – Trey Butkowski 31-yard field goal (Drive: 14 plays, 62 yards, 6:08; Pittsburgh 10–7)
- (0:02) PITT – Kenny Johnson 66-yard punt return, Trey Butkowski kick (Pittsburgh 17–7)

Third quarter

- (11:20) PITT – Trey Butkowski 42-yard field goal (Drive: 9 plays, 51 yards, 3:40; Pittsburgh 20–7)

Fourth quarter

- (10:48) PITT – Trey Butkowski 32-yard field goal (Drive: 4 plays, 4 yards, 0:49; Pittsburgh 23–7)
- (6:19) SYR – Emanuel Ross 12-yard pass from Rickie Collins, Rickie Collins run failed (Drive: 9 plays, 65 yards, 4:22; Pittsburgh 23–13)
- (1:57) PITT – Juelz Goff 1-yard run, Trey Butkowski kick (Drive: 10 plays, 35 yards, 3:28; Pittsburgh 30–13)

Statistics	PITT	SYR
First downs	16	13
Plays–yards	67–260	66–212
Rushes–yards	41–117	32–76
Passing yards	143	136
Passing: comp–att–int	13–24–1	17–34–3
Turnovers	1	3
Time of possession	29:58	30:02

Team	Category	Player	Statistics
Pittsburgh	Passing	Mason Heintschel	13/24, 143 yards, INT
Pittsburgh	Rushing	Ja'Kyrian Turner	15 carries, 42 yards
Pittsburgh	Receiving	Kenny Johnson	4 receptions, 59 yards
Syracuse	Passing	Rickie Collins	15/31, 126 yards, 2 TD, 3 INT
Syracuse	Rushing	Rickie Collins	10 carries, 37 yards
Syracuse	Receiving	Johntay Cook II	6 receptions, 66 yards

=== at No. 7 Georgia Tech ===
Syracuse Orange (3–4) at No. 7 Georgia Tech Yellow Jackets (7–0) – Game summary

Quarter	1	2	3	4	Total
Orange	3	0	7	6	16
No. 7 Yellow Jackets	3	17	14	7	41

at Bobby Dodd Stadium • Atlanta, Georgia

- Date: October 25
- Game time: 12:00 p.m. EDT
- Game weather:
- Game attendance: 51,913
- Referee: Jon Noli
- TV announcers (ESPN): Dave Pasch (play-by-play), Dusty Dvoracek (analyst), and Taylor McGregor (sideline)

Game information

First quarter

- SYR – Tripp Woody 27-yard field goal, 10:59. Orange 3–0. Drive: 5 plays, 33 yards, 3:23.
- GT – Aidan Birr 20-yard field goal, 6:16. Tied 3–3. Drive: 11 plays, 72 yards, 4:43.

Second quarter

- GT – Josh Beetham 21-yard pass from Haynes King (Aidan Birr kick), 12:05. Yellow Jackets 10–3. Drive: 10 plays, 68 yards, 3:55.
- GT – Josh Beetham 13-yard pass from Haynes King (Aidan Birr kick), 4:01. Yellow Jackets 17–3. Drive: 9 plays, 65 yards, 3:47.
- GT – Aidan Birr 22-yard field goal, 0:01. Yellow Jackets 20–3. Drive: 6 plays, 31 yards, 0:44.

Third quarter

- SYR – Darrell Gill Jr. 34-yard pass from Rickie Collins (Tripp Woody kick), 14:19. Yellow Jackets 20–10. Drive: 2 plays, 75 yards, 0:41.
- GT – Dean Patterson 37-yard pass from Haynes King (Aidan Birr kick), 11:02. Yellow Jackets 27–10. Drive: 7 plays, 75 yards, 3:17.
- GT – Haynes King 2-yard run (Aidan Birr kick), 6:01. Yellow Jackets 34–10. Drive: 5 plays, 65 yards, 2:39.

Fourth quarter

- SYR – Will Nixon 1-yard run (pass failed), 7:58. Yellow Jackets 34–16. Drive: 16 plays, 89 yards, 5:39.
- GT – Haynes King 4-yard run (Aidan Birr kick), 3:47. Yellow Jackets 41–16. Drive: 7 plays, 46 yards, 4:10.

Statistics	SYR	GT
First downs	17	27
Plays–yards	63–381	68–543
Rushes–yards	34–157	37–239
Passing yards	224	304
Passing: comp–att–int	19–29–0	25–31–0
Turnovers	1	1
Time of possession	28:20	29:34

Team	Category	Player	Statistics
Syracuse	Passing	Rickie Collins	17/29, 224 yards, TD
Syracuse	Rushing	Yasin Willis	10 carries, 76 yards
Syracuse	Receiving	Darrell Gill Jr.	5 receptions, 79 yards, TD
Georgia Tech	Passing	Haynes King	25/31, 304 yards, 3 TD
Georgia Tech	Rushing	Haynes King	12 carries, 91 yards, 2 TD
Georgia Tech	Receiving	Jordan Allen	6 receptions, 67 yards

=== vs North Carolina ===
North Carolina Tar Heels (2–5) at Syracuse Orange (3–5) – Game summary

Quarter	1	2	3	4	Total
Tar Heels	3	3	14	7	27
Orange	7	3	0	0	10

at JMA Wireless Dome • Syracuse, New York

- Date: October 31
- Game time: 7:30 p.m.
- Game weather: Indoor
- Game attendance: 37,184
- Referee: Mike Roche
- TV announcers (ESPN): Anish Shroff (play-by-play), Andre Ware (analyst), and Paul Carcaterra (sideline)

Game information

First quarter

- UNC – Rece Verhoff 24-yard field goal, 7:59. Tar Heels 3–0. Drive: 7 plays, 51 yards, 3:20.
- SYR – Anwar Sparrow 51-yard fumble return (Tripp Woody kick), 4:38. Orange 7–3.

Second quarter

- SYR – Tripp Woody 31-yard field goal, 12:17. Orange 10–3. Drive: 13 plays, 50 yards, 5:41.
- UNC – Rece Verhoff 43-yard field goal, 0:43. Orange 10–6. Drive: 8 plays, 67 yards, 4:05.

Third quarter

- UNC – Demon June 72-yard pass from Gio Lopez (Rece Verhoff kick), 13:26. Tar Heels 13–10. Drive: 1 play, 72 yards, 0:13.
- UNC – Demon June 5-yard run (Rece Verhoff kick), 0:08. Tar Heels 20–10. Drive: 12 plays, 80 yards, 7:10.

Fourth quarter

- UNC – Jordan Shipp 21-yard pass from Gio Lopez (Rece Verhoff kick), 10:35. Tar Heels 27–10. Drive: 4 plays, 34 yards, 2:18.

Statistics	UNC	SYR
First downs	20	12
Plays–yards	62–426	50–152
Rushes–yards	43–210	32–113
Passing yards	216	39
Passing: comp–att–int	15-19-0	4-18-0
Turnovers	1	1
Time of possession	35:29	24:31

Team	Category	Player	Statistics
North Carolina	Passing	Gio Lopez	15/19, 216 yards, 2 TD
North Carolina	Rushing	Demon June	13 carries, 101 yards, TD
North Carolina	Receiving	Demon June	2 receptions, 81 yards, TD
Syracuse	Passing	Joseph Filardi	4/18, 39 yards
Syracuse	Rushing	Yasin Willis	15 carries, 61 yards
Syracuse	Receiving	Darius Johnson	1 reception, 25 yards

=== at No. 18 Miami (FL) ===
Syracuse Orange (3–6) at No. 18 Miami Hurricanes (6–2) – Game summary

Quarter	1	2	3	4	Total
Orange	0	0	3	7	10
No. 18 Hurricanes	0	14	17	7	38

at Hard Rock Stadium • Miami Gardens, Florida

- Date: November 8
- Game time: 3:30 p.m.
- Game weather: Sunny • Temperature: 83 °F (28 °C) • Wind: SW at 2 miles per hour (3.2 km/h)
- Game attendance: 60,337
- Referee: Riley Johnson
- TV announcers (ESPN): Bob Wischusen (play-by-play), Louis Riddick (analyst), and Kris Budden (sideline)

Game information

First quarter

- No scoring plays.

Second quarter

- MIA – Carson Beck 14-yard pass from Malachi Toney (Carter Davis kick), 2:16. Hurricanes 7–0. Drive: 5 plays, 90 yards, 3:08.
- MIA – Keionte Scott 38-yard interception return (Carter Davis kick), 1:50. Hurricanes 14–0.

Third quarter

- SYR – Tripp Woody 38-yard field goal, 11:12. Hurricanes 14–3. Drive: 8 plays, 55 yards, 3:48.
- MIA – Keelan Marion 61-yard pass from Carson Beck (Carter Davis kick), 9:57. Hurricanes 21–3. Drive: 3 plays, 78 yards, 1:09.
- MIA – Girard Pringle Jr. 19-yard run (Carter Davis kick), 2:25. Hurricanes 28–3. Drive: 9 plays, 83 yards, 4:52.
- MIA – Carter Davis 36-yard field goal, 0:00. Hurricanes 31–3. Drive: 4 plays, 5 yards, 1:28.

Fourth quarter

- MIA – Francis Mauigoa 3-yard run (Bert Auburn kick), 2:53. Hurricanes 38–3. Drive: 5 plays, 51 yards, 2:56.
- SYR – Elijah Washington-Baker 17-yard pass from Joseph Filardi (Tripp Woody kick), 0:21. Hurricanes 38–10. Drive: 8 plays, 75 yards, 2:32.

Statistics	SYR	MIA
First downs	20	21
Plays–yards	71–285	57–385
Rushes–yards	43–161	32–124
Passing yards	124	261
Passing: comp–att–int	15–28–2	19–25–0
Turnovers	3	0
Time of possession	29:37	30:23

Team	Category	Player	Statistics
Syracuse	Passing	Rickie Collins	12/25, 85 yards, 2 INT
Syracuse	Rushing	Yasin Willis	13 carries, 63 yards
Syracuse	Receiving	Daunte Bacheyie	2 receptions, 22 yards
Miami (FL)	Passing	Carson Beck	18/24, 247 yards, TD
Miami (FL)	Rushing	Girard Pringle Jr.	7 carries, 55 yards, TD
Miami (FL)	Receiving	Keelan Marion	3 receptions, 116 yards, TD

=== at Notre Dame ===
Syracuse Orange (3–7) at No. 9 Notre Dame Fighting Irish (8–2) – Game summary

Quarter	1	2	3	4	Total
Orange	0	0	0	7	7
No. 9 Fighting Irish	35	14	7	14	70

at Notre Dame Stadium • Notre Dame, Indiana

- Date: November 22
- Game time: 3:30 p.m.
- Game weather: Sunny, 47 °F (8 °C), Wind SW @ 6 mph (10 km/h)
- Game attendance: 77,662
- Referee: Mike Roche
- TV announcers (NBC): Dan Hicks (play-by-play), Jason Garrett (analyst), and Zora Stephenson (sideline)

Game information

First quarter

- (14:03) ND – Jalen Stroman 44-yard interception return, Erik Schmidt kick (Drive: 0:50, Notre Dame 7–0)
- (12:19) ND – Luke Talich 22-yard punt return, Erik Schmidt kick (Drive: 1:38, Notre Dame 14–0)
- (9:43) ND – Leonard Moore 46-yard interception return, Erik Schmidt kick (Drive: 2:36, Notre Dame 21–0)
- (6:32) ND – Jeremiyah Love 45-yard run, Erik Schmidt kick (Drive: 2 plays, 59 yards, 0:36, Notre Dame 28–0)
- (4:01) ND – Jadarian Price 58-yard run, Erik Schmidt kick (Drive: 3 plays, 69 yards, 0:52, Notre Dame 35–0)

Second quarter

- (14:56) ND – Will Pauling 6-yard pass from CJ Carr, Erik Schmidt kick (Drive: 6 plays, 36 yards, 2:23, Notre Dame 42–0)
- (6:49) ND – Jeremiyah Love 14-yard run, Erik Schmidt kick (Drive: 4 plays, 59 yards, 3:46, Notre Dame 49–0)

Third quarter

- (14:23) ND – Jeremiyah Love 68-yard run, Erik Schmidt kick (Drive: 3 plays, 75 yards, 0:37, Notre Dame 56–0)

Fourth quarter

- (13:32) ND – Aneyas Williams 30-yard run, Erik Schmidt kick (Drive: 6 plays, 79 yards, 2:23, Notre Dame 63–0)
- (6:06) ND – Kenny Minchey 25-yard run, Erik Schmidt kick (Drive: 7 plays, 39 yards, 4:14, Notre Dame 70–0)
- (0:07) SYR – Joseph Filardi 6-yard run, Tripp Woody kick (Drive: 12 plays, 75 yards, 5:59, Notre Dame 70–7)

Statistics	SYR	ND
First downs	18	17
Plays–yards	80–207	39–396
Rushes–yards	50–112	24–329
Passing yards	95	67
Passing: comp–att–int	17–30–3	9–15–0
Turnovers	3	0
Time of possession	41:50	18:10

Team	Category	Player	Statistics
Syracuse	Passing	Joseph Filardi	14/26, 83 yards, 3 INT
Syracuse	Rushing	Joseph Filardi	14 carries, 33 yards, TD
Syracuse	Receiving	Dan Villari	5 receptions, 30 yards
Notre Dame	Passing	CJ Carr	5/9, 49 yards, TD
Notre Dame	Rushing	Jeremiyah Love	8 carries, 171 yards, 3 TD
Notre Dame	Receiving	Jordan Faison	2 receptions, 21 yards

=== vs Boston College ===
Boston College Eagles (1–10) at Syracuse Orange (3–8) – Game summary

Quarter	1	2	3	4	Total
Eagles	3	3	14	14	34
Orange	0	6	0	6	12

at JMA Wireless Dome • Syracuse, New York

- Date: November 29
- Game time: 3:00 p.m. EST
- Game weather: Indoor
- Game attendance: 32,457
- Referee: John Noli
- TV announcers (The CW): Thom Brennaman (play-by-play), Will Blackmon (analyst) and Wes Bryant (sideline)

Game information

First quarter

- BC – Luca Lombardo 30-yard field goal, 4:04. Eagles 3–0. Drive: 7 plays, 28 yards, 3:54.

Second quarter

- SYR – Tripp Woody 49-yard field goal, 14:15. Tied 3–3. Drive: 8 plays, 53 yards, 4:44.
- SYR – Tripp Woody 29-yard field goal, 3:05. Orange 6–3. Drive: 14 plays, 65 yards, 9:36.
- BC – Luca Lombardo 31-yard field goal, 0:28. Tied 6–6. Drive: 9 plays, 62 tards, 2:37.

Third quarter

- BC – Turbo Richard 16-yard run (Luca Lombardo kick), 11:54. Eagles 13–6. Drive: 3 plays, 79 yards, 0:59.
- BC – Jordan McDonald 2-yard run (Luca Lombardo kick), 0:59. Eagles 20–6. Drive: 8 plays, 69 yards, 4:12.

Fourth quarter

- BC – Turbo Richard 46-yard run (Luca Lombardo kick), 13:35. Eagles 27–6. Drive: 2 plays, 71 yards, 0:35.
- BC – Jordan McDonald 14-yard run (Luca Lombardo kick), 9:24. Eagles 34–6. Drive: 7 plays, 68 yards, 3:08.
- SYR – Dan Villari 1-yard run (pass failed), 3:20. Eagles 34–12. Drive: 12 plays, 75 yards, 6:04.

Statistics	BC	SYR
First downs	20	12
Total yards	55–433	59–254
Rushes–yards	29–137	41–189
Passing yards	296	65
Passing: comp–att–int	18–26–0	10–18–0
Turnovers	0	0
Time of possession	26:50	33:10

Team	Category	Player	Statistics
Boston College	Passing	Grayson James	16/24, 288 yards
Boston College	Rushing	Turbo Richard	15 carries, 102 yards, 2 TD
Boston College	Receiving	Lewis Bond	8 receptions, 171 yards
Syracuse	Passing	Joseph Filardi	10/18, 65 yards
Syracuse	Rushing	Will Nixon	16 carries, 73 yards
Syracuse	Receiving	Johntay Cook	3 receptions, 28 yards

== Personnel ==
=== Roster and coaching staff ===
2025 Syracuse Orange football team roster
Players
Coaches
Offense

Pos.	#	Name	Class
TE	0	David Clement	Jr
WR	2	Johntay Cook	Jr
WR	3	Jaylan Hornsby	Fr
QB	4	Jakhari Williams	Fr
WR	5	Umari Hatcher	Sr
RB	6	Yasin Willis	So
WR	7	Darien Williams	Fr
WR	8	Tyshawn Russell	So
QB	9	Steve Angeli	Jr
QB	10	Rickie Collins	So
QB	11	Luke Carney	Fr
WR	12	Justus Ross-Simmons	Sr
QB	13	Joseph Filardi	Fr
TE	13	Jamie Tremble	So
WR	14	Darius Johnson	Fr
WR	15	Darrell Gill Jr.	Jr
QB	16	Rich Belin	Fr
WR	17	Gabe Daniels	Fr
WR	18	Emanuel Ross	Fr
TE	19	Daunte Bacheyie	Fr
RB	22	Jaden Hart	So
WR	23	Ja'Meer Thomas	Fr
RB	24	Will Nixon	Sr
WR	26	Ta'Ron Haile	Fr
RB	28	Malachi Coleman	Fr
TE	30	Chase Simmons	Sr
RB	31	Tyler Chandler	So
WR	32	Nick Armentano	So
RB	36	Malachi James	So
FB	38	Max Runyon	Sr
RB	39	Tylik Hill	Fr
TE	42	Rubin Wasserman	Fr
OL	50	Kahlil Stewart	Fr
OL	51	Austin Collins	Sr
OL	53	Ted Olsen	So
OL	55	Zach Rice	Jr
OL	56	Patrick Alberga	Sr
OL	57	Da'Metrius Weatherspoon	Sr
OL	60	Naquil Betrand	So
OL	62	Jackson Iak	Fr
OL	63	Carter Clark	Jr
OL	64	Skylar Harvey	Fr
OL	65	Adam Boehiem	Fr
OL	67	D'Joni Scatliffe	Fr
OL	68	Vito Shevchenko	Fr
OL	69	TJ Ferguson	Sr
OL	70	Kardiear Shepherd	Fr
OL	71	Jayden Mann	Fr
OL	72	Mark Petry	Sr
OL	73	Joshua Miller	So
OL	74	Matthew Hawn	Fr
OL	75	Trevion Mack	So
OL	76	Byron Washington	Fr
OL	77	Kam Pringle	Fr
OL	78	Joe Cruz	Jr
OL	79	Travis Brown-Miller	Fr
WR	83	Julian McFadden	Fr
TE	84	Elijah Washington-Baker	Fr
WR	85	Sean Murphy	Fr
WR	86	Terrell Wilfong	Fr
TE	87	Wyatt Bowman	Fr
WR	87	Nate Edwards	Fr
TE	89	Dan Villari	Sr

Defense

Pos.	#	Name	Class
DB	0	Braheem Long Jr.	So
DB, WR	1	Demetres Samuel Jr	Fr
DB	2	Duce Chestnut	Sr
DB	3	Kaylib Singleton	Fr
DL	4	Dion Wilson Jr.	Sr
LB	5	Antoine Deslauriers	Fr
LB	6	James Heard	So
DL	7	Chris Thomas	Sr
LB	8	David Reese	Sr
DL	9	Isaiah Hastings	Jr
DB	10	Davien Kerr	So
DL	11	Denis Jaquez Jr.	Sr
LB	12	Anwar Sparrow	Sr
LB	13	Gary Bryant III	Jr
DB	14	Davion Kerr	Fr
LB	15	Derek McDonald	Sr
DB	16	Chris Peal	So
DB	17	Jalil Martin	Jr
LB	18	David Omopariola	So
DB	19	Cornell Perry	Jr
DB	20	Rayshon Andrews	Fr
LB	21	Fran Brown Jr.	So
LB	22	Zyian Moultrie-Goddard	So
DB	23	Devin Grant	Sr
DB	24	Ibn McDaniels	Fr
DB	25	Ziyyon Bredell	Fr
DB	27	Javon Lawrence	Fr
LB	28	Jahide Lasaine Jr.	So
DB	29	Berry Buxton III	Sr
DB	31	Marcus Washington Jr.	Jr
DB	32	Greg Delaine	Jr
LB	33	Caden Brown	So
DB	34	Nate Prater	Jr
DB	36	Lucas Vermeulen	Fr
LB	37	Luis Puente	Fr
DB	38	James Trotter	Fr
DB	39	Bradley Chandler	Fr
DB	40	Tommy Porter	Sr
LB	42	Trey Dudley	Fr
LB	43	Garvin St. John	Fr
LB	45	Fatim Diggs	Fr
LB	49	Josh Kubala	Jr
DL	52	DeAngelo Thompson	Fr
DL	58	Nathan Nyandoro	Fr
DL	59	Marcale Billue	So
DL	77	Jaylen Pray	Fr
DL	88	Elijah Crawford	Fr
DL	90	Quante Gillians	Fr
DL	91	George Rooks	Sr
DL	92	Rashard Perry	Jr
DL	93	Nissi Ogbebor	Fr
DL	94	Kevin Jobity Jr.	Sr
DL	95	Eric Thomas	Fr
DL	97	Clark Calloway	Fr
DL	99	Elijah Fuentes-Cundiff	Sr

Special teams

Pos.	#	Name	Class
P	41	Jack Stonehouse	Sr
K	46	Evan Cox	Fr
K	47	Tripp Woody	Fr
K	48	Jan Bogdan	Fr
LS	61	Ethan Stangle	Jr
P	96	Mateja Pavlovich	Fr
K	98	Jadyn Oh	So

Head coach

- Fran Brown

Coordinators/assistant coaches

- Elijah Robinson – Assistant head coach/defensive coordinator
- Jeff Nixon –Offensive coordinator/running backs
- Ricky Brumfield – Special teams coordinator
- Michael Johnson – Co-offensive coordinator/tight ends
- Robert Wright – Co-defensive coordinator/linebackers
- Nunzio Campanile – Associate offensive coach/quarterbacks
- Joe Schaefer – Defensive backs
- Myles White – Passing game coordinator/wide receivers
- Dale Williams – Offensive linemen
- Nick Williams – Defensive ends
- Jeff Ambrosie – Assistant offensive line coach
- Ryan Barry – Defensive quality control
- Will Coale – Special teams quality control
- Mike Gillespie – Offensive quality control
- Dimitri Hill – Offensive quality control
- Ben Kaplan – Offensive quality control
- Dre Kates – Defensive quality control
- Tyree Nobles – Defensive quality control
- Dennis Thomas – Offensive quality control
- Zach Van Arsdale – Offensive quality control
- Blaine Miller – Senior defensive analyst
- Tyshon Fogg – Defensive analyst
- Manny Harris – Offensive analyst
- Devin Redd – Assistant running backs coach
- Jeremy Ruskin – Defensive analyst
- Nitron Stork – Defensive analyst

Legend

- (C) Team captain
- (S) Suspended
- (I) Ineligible
- Injured
- Redshirt

Roster
Last update: 7/24/25
