= 2025 Georgia Tech Yellow Jackets football team =

American college football season

2025 Georgia Tech Yellow Jackets football

Pop-Tarts Bowl, L 21–25 vs. BYU
- Conference: Atlantic Coast Conference

Ranking
- Coaches: No. 24
- Record: 9–4 (6–2 ACC)
- Head coach: Brent Key (3rd season)
- Offensive coordinator: Buster Faulkner (3rd season)
- Co-offensive coordinator: Chris Weinke (3rd season)
- Offensive scheme: Pro spread
- Defensive coordinator: Blake Gideon (1st season)
- Base defense: 4–2–5
- Home stadium: Bobby Dodd Stadium

Uniform
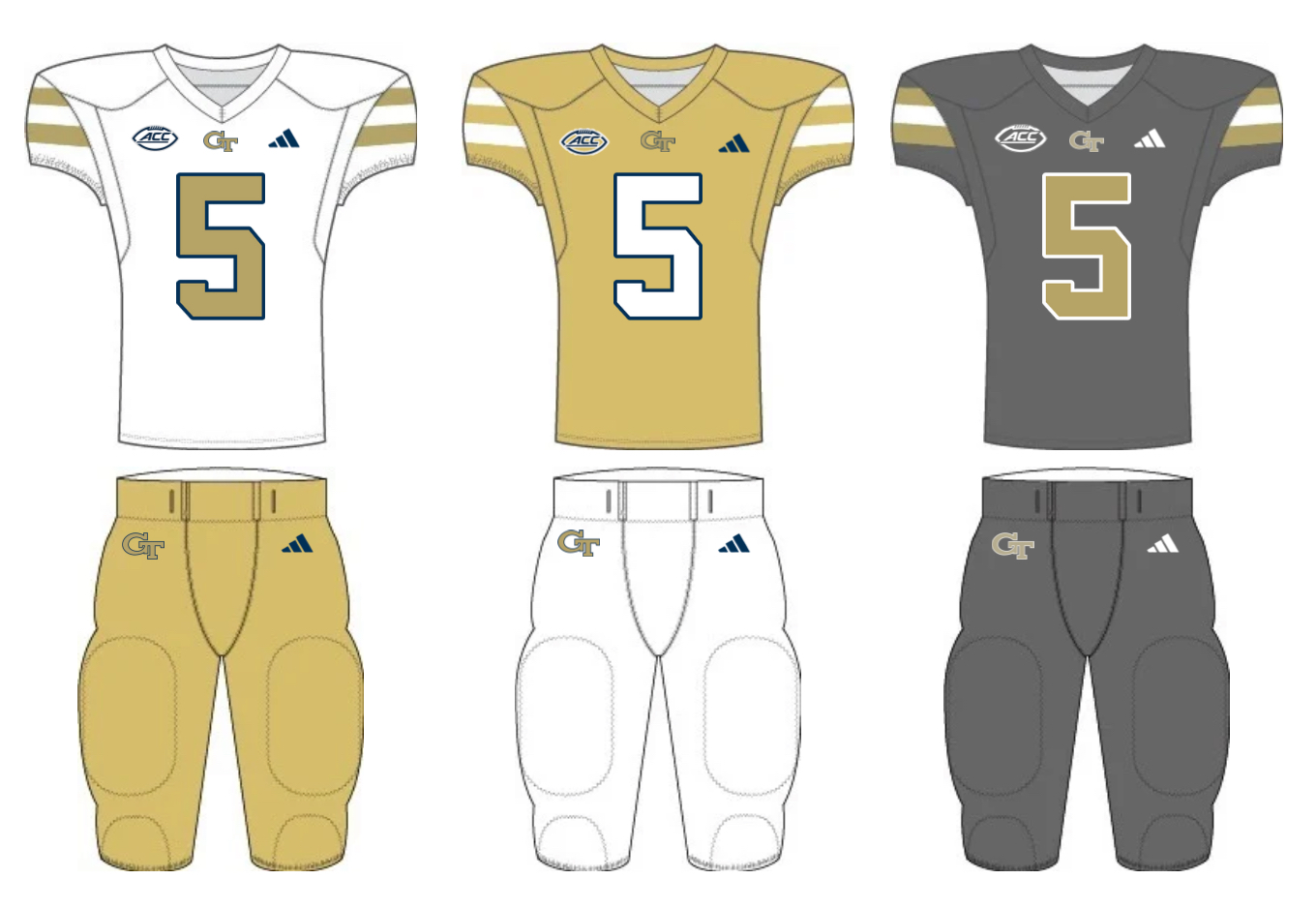

2025 Atlantic Coast Conference football standings
| | Conf. | | | Overall |
| Team | W | | L | W | | L |
|---|---|---|---|---|---|---|
| No. 16 Virginia y | 7 | – | 1 | 11 | – | 3 |
| Duke y$ | 6 | – | 2 | 9 | – | 5 |
| No. 2 Miami (FL) ^ | 6 | – | 2 | 13 | – | 3 |
| Georgia Tech | 6 | – | 2 | 9 | – | 4 |
| SMU | 6 | – | 2 | 9 | – | 4 |
| Pittsburgh | 6 | – | 2 | 8 | – | 5 |
| Louisville | 4 | – | 4 | 9 | – | 4 |
| Wake Forest | 4 | – | 4 | 9 | – | 4 |
| NC State | 4 | – | 4 | 8 | – | 5 |
| California | 4 | – | 4 | 7 | – | 6 |
| Clemson | 4 | – | 4 | 7 | – | 6 |
| Stanford | 3 | – | 5 | 4 | – | 8 |
| Florida State | 2 | – | 6 | 5 | – | 7 |
| Virginia Tech | 2 | – | 6 | 3 | – | 9 |
| North Carolina | 2 | – | 6 | 4 | – | 8 |
| Boston College | 1 | – | 7 | 2 | – | 10 |
| Syracuse | 1 | – | 7 | 3 | – | 9 |
Championship: Duke 27, Virginia 20^{OT}
^ – College Football Playoff participant; $ – Conference champion; y – Championship game participant; As of October 19, 2026; Rankings from AP Poll

The 2025 Georgia Tech Yellow Jackets football team represented Georgia Tech as a member of the Atlantic Coast Conference (ACC) during the 2025 NCAA Division I FBS football season. The Yellow Jackets were led by Brent Key in his third full year as Georgia Tech's head coach. They played their home games at Bobby Dodd Stadium located in Atlanta, Georgia.

This season marked the first time the Yellow Jackets begun a season 8–0, their best 8-game start since joining the ACC, and their first such start since 1966. Highlights included Aidan Birr's last-second fire-drill game-winning field goal over Clemson and thrilling wins over Colorado, Wake Forest, and eventual ACC champions Duke. They were ranked by the AP poll as high as 7th, their highest since 2009, before losing four of their final five games.

Quarterback Haynes King finished 10th in Heisman Trophy voting, and was named ACC Player of the Year. The Jackets finished ranked 24th in the Coaches Poll, their first ranking in the final poll since 2014.

== Offseason ==
=== 2025 NFL draft ===
| Round | Pick | Player | Position | Team |
|---|---|---|---|---|
| 5* | 173 | Jackson Hawes | TE | Buffalo Bills |
| 7* | 253 | Zeek Biggers | DT | Miami Dolphins |

=== Transfers ===
==== Incoming ====
| Name | Pos. | Height | Weight | Hometown | Prev. school |
|---|---|---|---|---|---|
| Matthew Alexander | DL | 6'3" | 260 lbs | Buford, GA | UCF |
| J.T. Byrne | TE | 6'6" | 238 lbs | Carmel, CA | California |
| Malachi Carney | OT | 6'4" | 280 lbs | Pleasant Grove, AL | South Alabama |
| Debron Gatling | WR | 6'0" | 175 lbs | Alpharetta, GA | South Carolina |
| Jyron Gilmore | CB | 5'8" | 161 lbs | Citra, FL | Georgia State |
| Kelvin Hill Jr. | CB | 5'10" | 170 lbs | Carrollton, GA | UAB |
| AJ Hoffler | DL | 6'4" | 240 lbs | Atlanta, GA | Clemson |
| Malachi Hosley | RB | 5'10" | 205 lbs | Columbus, GA | Penn |
| Melvin Jordan IV | LB | 5'11" | 216 lbs | Saint Petersburg, FL | Oregon State |
| Harry Lodge | TE | 6'6" | 230 lbs | Belmont, MA | Wake Forest |
| Brayden Manley | EDGE | 6'2" | 245 lbs | Vanceboro, NC | Mercer |
| Jon Mitchell | CB | 5'11" | 195 lbs | Jacksonville, FL | Penn State |
| Marshall Nichols | P | 6'1" | 200 lbs | Atlanta, GA | UNLV |
| Robert Dean Patterson | WR | 6'0" | 174 lbs | Lutz, FL | FIU |
| William Reed | OT | 6'6" | 280 lbs | Sammamish, WA | Princeton |
| Savion Riley | S | 6'2" | 202 lbs | Acworth, GA | Colorado |
| Eric Rivers | WR | 5'11" | 174 lbs | Chattanooga, TN | FIU |
| Andrew Rosinski | OT | 6'6" | 265 lbs | Ball Ground, GA | North Carolina |
| Cayman Spaulding | LB | 6'0" | 190 lbs | Lithonia, GA | Tennessee Tech |
| Akelo Stone | DL | 6'2" | 252 | Savannah, GA | Ole Miss |
| Ronald Triplette | EDGE | 6'2" | 240 lbs | Pearland, TX | UTSA |
| Daiquan White | CB | 5'11" | 168 lbs | Fairburn, GA | Eastern Michigan |
| Luke Whiting | LS | 6'4" | 225 lbs | Salt Lake City, UT | Florida Atlantic |

==== Outgoing ====
| Name | Pos. | Height | Weight | Hometown | New school |
|---|---|---|---|---|---|
| Cade Adams | DL | 6'0" | 285 lbs | Dawsonville, GA | Unknown |
| Nacari Ashley | LB | 6'3" | 210 lbs | Marietta, GA | Navarro College |
| Brandon Best | IOL | 6'4" | 295 lbs | Tucker, GA | Kennesaw State |
| Leo Blackburn | TE | 6'5" | 230 lbs | Atlanta, GA | Georgia State |
| Jordan Brown | OT | 6'5" | 325 lbs | Long Beach, CA | Arizona |
| Christian Burkhalter | EDGE | 6'5" | 230 lbs | Spanish Fort, AL | North Alabama |
| Anthony Carrie | RB | 5'11" | 195 lbs | Tampa, FL | FIU |
| Nehemiah Chandler | S | 6'2" | 165 lbs | Quincy, FL | South Alabama |
| Trevion Cooley | RB | 5'11" | 208 lbs | Knightdale, NC | Troy |
| Jacob Cruz | LB | 6'4" | 232 lbs | Acworth, GA | Jacksonville State |
| Jayden Davis | S | 6'2" | 175 lbs | Suwanee, GA | Georgia Southern |
| Austin Dean | LB | 6'2" | 215 lbs | Tampa, FL | Unknown |
| Evan Dickens | RB | 5'10" | 170 lbs | Roswell, GA | Liberty |
| Caleb Dozier | LB | 6'3" | 220 lbs | Headland, AL | South Alabama |
| Cedric Franklin | S | 6'2" | 185 lbs | Marietta, GA | Arkansas State |
| Khari Gee | S | 6'3" | 185 lbs | Atlanta, GA | Unknown |
| Syeed Gibbs | CB | 6'0" | 180 lbs | Everett, MA | Kansas |
| Kai Greer | IOL | 6'6" | 285 lbs | Waxhaw, NC | Stanford |
| Romello Height | EDGE | 6'5" | 216 lbs | Dublin, GA | Texas Tech |
| Trey Horne | WR | 6'3" | 195 lbs | Columbia, SC | Southern Miss |
| Harry Lodge | TE | 6'6" | 230 lbs | Belmont, MA | Wake Forest |
| Uche Iloh | DL | 6'7" | 228 lbs | Peachtree City, GA | Georgia Southern |
| Abdul Janneh | WR | 6'3" | 185 lbs | Duquesne, PA | Unknown |
| Christian Leary | WR | 5'10" | 173 lbs | Orlando, FL | Western Michigan |
| Horace Lockett | DL | 6'6" | 341 lbs | Atlanta, GA | UCF |
| Jackson Long | TE | 6'5" | 220 lbs | Hendersonville, TN | Unknown |
| Andrew Nelms | K/P | 6'1" | 195 lbs | Marietta, GA | Unknown |
| David Prince | TE | 6'4" | 220 lbs | Brunswick, GA | Unknown |
| Zach Pyron | QB | 6'2" | 212 lbs | Pinson, AL | South Alabama |
| Corey Robinson II | OT | 6'5" | 270 lbs | Roswell, GA | Arkansas |
| Malik Rutherford | WR | 5'9" | 170 lbs | Hialeah, FL | Withdrawn |
| Patrick Screws | OT | 6'6" | 315 lbs | Eufaula, AL | Troy |
| Taye Seymore | S | 5'11" | 203 lbs | Atlanta, GA | Auburn |
| Eric Singleton Jr. | WR | 5'11" | 173 lbs | Douglasville, GA | Auburn |
| Luke Whiting | LS | 6'4" | 225 lbs | Salt Lake City, UT | Colorado |

== Schedule ==
| Date | Time | Opponent | Rank | Site | TV | Result | Attendance |
|---|---|---|---|---|---|---|---|
| August 29 | 8:00 p.m. | at Colorado* | | Folsom Field; Boulder, CO | ESPN | W 27–20 | 52,868 |
| September 6 | 3:30 p.m. | Gardner–Webb* | | Bobby Dodd Stadium; Atlanta, GA | ACCNX/ESPN+ | W 59–12 | 37,775 |
| September 13 | 12:00 p.m. | No. 12 Clemson | | Bobby Dodd Stadium; Atlanta, GA (rivalry) | ESPN | W 24–21 | 48,059 |
| September 20 | 4:30 p.m. | Temple* | No. 18 | Bobby Dodd Stadium; Atlanta, GA | The CW | W 45–24 | 45,123 |
| September 27 | 12:00 p.m. | at Wake Forest | No. 16 | Allegacy Federal Credit Union Stadium; Winston-Salem, NC | ESPN | W 30–29 ^{OT} | 30,264 |
| October 11 | 3:30 p.m. | Virginia Tech | No. 13 | Bobby Dodd Stadium; Atlanta, GA (rivalry) | ACCN | W 35–20 | 50,878 |
| October 18 | 12:00 p.m. | at Duke | No. 12 | Wallace Wade Stadium; Durham, NC | ESPN | W 27–18 | 27,846 |
| October 25 | 12:00 p.m. | Syracuse | No. 7 | Bobby Dodd Stadium; Atlanta, GA | ESPN | W 41–16 | 51,913 |
| November 1 | 7:30 p.m. | at NC State | No. 8 | Carter–Finley Stadium; Raleigh, NC | ESPN2 | L 36–48 | 56,919 |
| November 15 | 3:30 p.m. | at Boston College | No. 16 | Alumni Stadium; Chestnut Hill, MA | ACCN | W 36–34 | 37,879 |
| November 22 | 7:00 p.m. | Pittsburgh | No. 16 | Bobby Dodd Stadium; Atlanta, GA | ESPN | L 28–42 | 52,413 |
| November 28 | 3:30 p.m. | vs. No. 4 Georgia* | No. 23 | Mercedes-Benz Stadium; Atlanta, GA (Clean, Old-Fashioned Hate) | ABC | L 9–16 | 73,728 |
| December 27 | 3:30 p.m. | vs. No. 12 BYU* | No. 22 | Camping World Stadium; Orlando, FL (Pop-Tarts Bowl) | ABC | L 21–25 | 34,126 |
*Non-conference game; Rankings from AP Poll (and CFP Rankings, after November 4) - Released prior to game; All times are in Eastern time

== Rankings ==
Ranking movements Legend: ██ Increase in ranking ██ Decrease in ranking RV = Received votes т = Tied with team above or below
| | Week | | | | | | | | | | | | | | | | |
| Poll | Pre | 1 | 2 | 3 | 4 | 5 | 6 | 7 | 8 | 9 | 10 | 11 | 12 | 13 | 14 | 15 | Final |
|---|---|---|---|---|---|---|---|---|---|---|---|---|---|---|---|---|---|
| AP | RV | RV | RV | 18 | 16 | 17 | 13 | 12 | 7 | 8 | 16 | 14 | 15 | 23 | 24 | 24 | RV |
| Coaches | RV | RV | RV | 19 | 17 | 16 | 13 | 12 | 7 | 7 | 14 | 12т | 12 | 19 | 23 | 22 | 24 |
| CFP | Not released | | | | | | | | | | 17 | 16 | 16 | 23 | 22 | 22 | Not released |

== Game summaries ==
=== at Colorado ===
Georgia Tech Yellow Jackets (0–0) at Colorado Buffaloes (0–0) – Game summary

| Quarter | 1 | 2 | 3 | 4 | Total |
|---|---|---|---|---|---|
| Yellow Jackets | 0 | 13 | 7 | 7 | 27 |
| Buffaloes | 7 | 3 | 3 | 7 | 20 |

at Folsom Field • Boulder, CO

- Date: August 29, 2025
- Game time: 8:00 p.m. EDT
- Game weather: Mostly cloudy • Temperature: 64 °F (18 °C) • Wind: W 7 mph
- Game attendance: 52,868
- Referee: Michael Vandervelde
- TV announcers (ESPN): Dave Pasch (play-by-play), Dusty Dvoracek (analyst), and Taylor McGregor (sideline)

Game information

First quarter

- COLO – Dekalon Taylor 8-yard pass from Kaidon Salter (Alejandro Mata kick), 12:08. Buffaloes 7–0. Drive: 5 plays, 36 yards, 2:27.

Second quarter

- GT – Aidan Birr 32-yard field goal, 13:31. Buffaloes 7–3. Drive: 13 plays, 84 yards, 6:30.
- GT – Haynes King 4-yard run (Aidan Birr kick), 4:33. Yellow Jackets 10–7. Drive: 10 plays, 80 yards, 5:57.
- COLO – Alejandro Mata 42-yard field goal, 1:39. Tied 10–10. Drive: 8 plays, 51 yards, 2:54.
- GT – Aidan Birr 43-yard field goal, 0:00. Yellow Jackets 13–10. Drive: 9 plays, 49 yards, 1:39.

Third quarter

- COLO – Alejandro Mata 29-yard field goal, 6:00. Tied 13–13. Drive: 8 plays, 39 yards, 4:15.
- GT – Haynes King 17-yard run (Aidan Birr kick), 0:14. Yellow Jackets 20–13. Drive: 11 plays, 75 yards, 5:46.

Fourth quarter

- COLO – Kaidon Salter 7-yard run (Alejandro Mata kick), 8:25. Tied 20–20. Drive: 15 plays, 75 yards, 6:49.
- GT – Haynes King 45-yard run (Aidan Birr kick), 1:07. Yellow Jackets 27–20. Drive: 5 plays, 61 yards, 1:44.

| Statistics | GT | COLO |
|---|---|---|
| First downs | 27 | 19 |
| Plays–yards | 68–463 | 60–305 |
| Rushes–yards | 47–320 | 31–146 |
| Passing yards | 143 | 159 |
| Passing: comp–att–int | 13–21–1 | 17–29–0 |
| Turnovers | 3 | 0 |
| Time of possession | 32:23 | 27:37 |

| Team | Category | Player | Statistics |
|---|---|---|---|
| Georgia Tech | Passing | Haynes King | 13/20, 143 yards, INT |
| Georgia Tech | Rushing | Haynes King | 19 carries, 156 yards, 3 TD |
| Georgia Tech | Receiving | Bailey Stockton | 4 receptions, 48 yards |
| Colorado | Passing | Kaidon Salter | 17/28, 159 yards, TD |
| Colorado | Rushing | Micah Welch | 11 carries, 64 yards |
| Colorado | Receiving | Omarion Miller | 1 reception, 39 yards |

=== vs. Gardner–Webb (FCS) ===
Gardner–Webb Runnin' Bulldogs (FCS) (1–0) at Georgia Tech Yellow Jackets (1–0) – Game summary

| Quarter | 1 | 2 | 3 | 4 | Total |
|---|---|---|---|---|---|
| Runnin' Bulldogs (FCS) | 6 | 0 | 0 | 6 | 12 |
| Yellow Jackets | 7 | 21 | 14 | 17 | 59 |

at Bobby Dodd Stadium • Atlanta, GA

- Date: September 6
- Game time: 3:30 p.m. EDT
- Game weather: Cloudy • Temperature: 86 °F (30 °C) • Wind: SW 11 mph
- Game attendance: 37,775
- Referee: Art Brown
- TV announcers (ACCNX/ESPN+): Justin Kutcher (play-by-play) and Forrest Conoly (analyst)

Game information

First quarter

- GWEB – Anthony Lowe 1-yard pass from Nate Hampton (Charlie Viorel kick failed), 10:17. Runnin' Bulldogs 6–0. Drive: 6 plays, 42 yards, 2:33.
- GT – Isiah Canion 11-yard pass from Aaron Philo (Aidan Birr kick), 3:07. Yellow Jackets 7–6. Drive: 4 plays, 58 yards, 1:20.

Second quarter

- GT – Malachi Hosley 55-yard run (Aidan Birr kick), 13:32. Yellow Jackets 14–6. Drive: 2 plays, 61 yards, 0:29.
- GT – Jamal Haynes 47-yard run (Aidan Birr kick), 9:35. Yellow Jackets 21–6. Drive: 3 plays, 94 yards, 1:07.
- GT – Jamal Haynes 1-yard run (Aidan Birr kick), 3:59. Yellow Jackets 28–6. Drive: 7 plays, 36 yards, 2:49.

Third quarter

- GT – Malachi Hosley 5-yard run (Aidan Birr kick), 7:12. Yellow Jackets 35–6. Drive: 5 plays, 25 yards, 2:19.
- GT – Ahmari Harvey 65-yard blocked field goal return (Aidan Birr kick), 0:36. Yellow Jackets 42–6.

Fourth quarter

- GWEB – Caleb Borders 14-yard pass from Cole Pennington (Charlie Viorel kick blocked), 13:39. Yellow Jackets 42–12. Drive: 7 plays, 75 yards, 1:57.
- GT – Aidan Birr 23-yard field goal, 10:19. Yellow Jackets 45–12. Drive: 8 plays, 57 yards, 3:17.
- GT – J.P. Powell 1-yard run (Aidan Birr kick), 6:21. Yellow Jackets 52–12. Drive: 3 plays, 86 yards, 1:36.
- GT – Dean Patterson 84-yard pass from Graham Knowles (Aidan Birr kick), 3:03. Yellow Jackets 59–12. Drive: 1 play, 84 yards, 0:12.

| Statistics | GWEB | GT |
|---|---|---|
| First downs | 20 | 21 |
| Plays–yards | 77–326 | 57–680 |
| Rushes–yards | 47–117 | 28–223 |
| Passing yards | 209 | 457 |
| Passing: comp–att–int | 20–30–0 | 22–29–1 |
| Turnovers | 1 | 2 |
| Time of possession | 37:23 | 22:40 |

| Team | Category | Player | Statistics |
|---|---|---|---|
| Gardner–Webb | Passing | Cole Pennington | 14/21, 164 yards, TD |
| Gardner–Webb | Rushing | Quasean Holmes | 14 carries, 48 yards |
| Gardner–Webb | Receiving | Anthony Lowe | 8 receptions, 87 yards, TD |
| Georgia Tech | Passing | Aaron Philo | 21/28, 373 yards, TD, INT |
| Georgia Tech | Rushing | Malachi Hosley | 9 carries, 100 yards, 2 TD |
| Georgia Tech | Receiving | Dean Patterson | 3 receptions, 87 yards, TD |

=== vs No. 12 Clemson (rivalry) ===
No. 12 Clemson Tigers (1–1) at Georgia Tech Yellow Jackets (2–0) – Game summary

| Quarter | 1 | 2 | 3 | 4 | Total |
|---|---|---|---|---|---|
| No. 12 Tigers | 0 | 7 | 7 | 7 | 21 |
| Yellow Jackets | 3 | 10 | 0 | 11 | 24 |

at Bobby Dodd Stadium • Atlanta, GA

- Date: September 13
- Game time: 12:00 p.m. EDT
- Game weather: Sunny • Temperature: 79 °F (26 °C) • Wind: NE 4 mph
- Game attendance: 48,059
- Referee: Adam Savoie
- TV announcers (ESPN): Bob Wischusen (play-by-play), Louis Riddick (analyst), and Kris Budden (sideline)

Game information

First quarter

- (05:50) GT – Aidan Birr 40-yard field goal (Drive: 4 plays, 7 yards, 1:34; GT 3–0)

Second quarter

- (14:55) GT – Jamal Haynes 5-yard run, Aidan Birr kick (Drive: 5 plays, 65 yards, 1:45; GT 10–0)
- (07:46) GT – Aidan Birr 42-yard field goal (Drive: 10 plays, 46 yards, 5:36; GT 13–0)
- (00:49) CLEM – Cade Klubnik 2-yard run, Nolan Hauser kick (Drive: 16 plays, 75 yards, 6:57; GT 13–7)

Third quarter

- (09:36) CLEM – Bryant Wesco Jr. 76-yard pass from Cade Klubnik, Nolan Hauser kick (Drive: 2 plays, 76 yards, 0:51; CLEM 14–13)

Fourth quarter

- (10:02) GT – Haynes King 1-yard run, Dean Patterson pass from Malik Rutherford for 2-pt (Drive: 13 plays, 90 yards, 6:15; GT 21–14)
- (03:26) CLEM – Adam Randall 2-yard run, Nolan Hauser Hauser kick (Drive: 13 plays, 75 yards, 6:36; Tie 21–21)
- (00:00) GT – Aidan Birr 55-yard field goal (Drive: 10 plays, 38 yards, 3:26; GT 24–21)

| Statistics | CLEM | GT |
|---|---|---|
| First downs | 17 | 18 |
| Plays–yards | 61–381 | 70–358 |
| Rushes–yards | 35–174 | 42–147 |
| Passing yards | 207 | 211 |
| Passing: comp–att–int | 15–26–1 | 20–28–0 |
| Turnovers | 2 | 0 |
| Time of possession | 27:55 | 32:05 |

| Team | Category | Player | Statistics |
|---|---|---|---|
| Clemson | Passing | Cade Klubnik | 15/26, 207 yards, TD, INT |
| Clemson | Rushing | Adam Randall | 15 carries, 80 yards, TD |
| Clemson | Receiving | Bryant Wesco Jr. | 7 receptions, 126 yards, TD |
| Georgia Tech | Passing | Haynes King | 20/28, 211 yards |
| Georgia Tech | Rushing | Haynes King | 25 carries, 103 yards, TD |
| Georgia Tech | Receiving | Isiah Canion | 5 receptions, 56 yards |

=== vs Temple ===
Temple Owls (2–1) at No. 18 Georgia Tech Yellow Jackets (3–0) – Game summary

| Quarter | 1 | 2 | 3 | 4 | Total |
|---|---|---|---|---|---|
| Owls | 0 | 7 | 7 | 10 | 24 |
| No. 18 Yellow Jackets | 21 | 0 | 14 | 10 | 45 |

at Bobby Dodd Stadium • Atlanta, GA

- Date: September 20
- Game time: 5:00 p.m. EDT
- Game weather: Sunny • Temperature: 87 °F (31 °C) • Wind: SW at 2 miles per hour (3.2 km/h)
- Game attendance: 45,123
- Referee: Riley Johnson
- TV announcers (The CW): Thom Brennaman (play-by-play), Will Blackmon (analyst), and Wes Bryant (sideline)

Game information

First quarter

- (11:37) GT – Haynes King 17-yard run, Aidan Birr kick (Drive: 5 plays, 71 yards, 2:19; Georgia Tech 7–0)
- (7:37) GT – Malik Rutherford 24-yard pass from Haynes King, Aidan Birr kick (Drive: 5 plays, 63 yards, 1:49; Georgia Tech 14–0)
- (2:38) GT – Isiah Canion 37-yard pass from Haynes King, Aidan Birr kick (Drive: 6 plays, 65 yards, 2:23; Georgia Tech 21–0)

Second quarter

- (12:29) TEM – Jay Ducker 2-yard run, Carl Hardin kick (Drive: 11 plays, 75 yards, 5:09; Georgia Tech 21–7)

Third quarter

- (13:53) TEM – JoJo Bermundez 28-yard pass from Evan Simon, Carl Hardin kick (Drive: 2 plays, 31 yards, 0:41; Georgia Tech 21–14)
- (11:47) GT – Malachi Hosley 34-yard run, Aidan Birr kick (Drive: 4 plays, 75 yards, 2:06; Georgia Tech 28–14)
- (2:56) GT – Malachi Hosley 2-yard run, Aidan Birr kick (Drive: 5 plays, 68 yards, 2:41; Georgia Tech 35–14)

Fourth quarter

- (8:50) GT – Aidan Birr 32-yard field goal (Drive: 8 plays, 46 yards, 4:16; Georgia Tech 38–14)
- (5:25) GT – Carl Hardin 41-yard field goal (Drive: 8 plays, 52 yards, 3:25; Georgia Tech 38–17)
- (5:15) GT – Daylon Gordon 47-yard run, Aidan Birr kick (Drive: 1 play, 47 yards, 0:09; Georgia Tech 45–17)
- (0:03) TEM – Xavier Irvin 4-yard pass from Gevani McCoy, Carl Hardin kick (Drive: 13 plays, 75 yards, 5:12; Georgia Tech 45–24)

| Statistics | TEM | GT |
|---|---|---|
| First downs | 19 | 19 |
| Plays–yards | 81–328 | 48–468 |
| Rushes–yards | 44–184 | 30–307 |
| Passing yards | 144 | 161 |
| Passing: comp–att–int | 17–37–0 | 13–18–0 |
| Turnovers | 0 | 1 |
| Time of possession | 37:29 | 22:31 |

| Team | Category | Player | Statistics |
|---|---|---|---|
| Temple | Passing | Evan Simon | 13/32, 127 yards, TD |
| Temple | Rushing | Jay Ducker | 14 carries, 76 yards, TD |
| Temple | Receiving | Jojo Bermudez | 4 receptions, 58 yards, TD |
| Georgia Tech | Passing | Haynes King | 13/18, 161 yards, 2 TD |
| Georgia Tech | Rushing | Jamal Haynes | 12 carries, 107 yards |
| Georgia Tech | Receiving | Isiah Canion | 2 receptions, 44 yards, TD |

=== at Wake Forest ===
No. 16 Georgia Tech Yellow Jackets (4–0) at Wake Forest Demon Deacons (2–1) – Game summary

| Quarter | 1 | 2 | 3 | 4 | OT | Total |
|---|---|---|---|---|---|---|
| No. 16 Yellow Jackets | 3 | 0 | 14 | 6 | 7 | 30 |
| Demon Deacons | 0 | 17 | 3 | 3 | 6 | 29 |

at Allegacy Federal Credit Union Stadium • Winston-Salem, NC

- Date: September 27
- Game time: 12:00 p.m. EDT
- Game weather:
- Game attendance: 30,264
- Referee: Darryl DeBerry
- TV announcers (ESPN): Mike Monaco (play-by-play), Kirk Morrison (analyst), and Dawn Davenport (sideline)

Game information

First quarter

- GT – Aidan Birr 35-yard field goal, 8:09. Yellow Jackets 3–0. Drive: 7 plays, 22 yards, 2:34.

Second quarter

- WAKE – Robby Ashford 4-yard run (Connor Calvert kick), 10:46. Demon Deacons 7–3. Drive: 6 plays, 66 yards, 2:25.
- WAKE – Demond Claiborne 27-yard run (Connor Calvert kick), 5:53. Demon Deacons 14–3. Drive: 4 plays, 69 yards, 1:28.
- WAKE – Connor Calvert 24-yard field goal, 0:22. Demon Deacons 17–3. Drive: 9 plays, 83 yards, 2:49.

Third quarter

- WAKE – Connor Calvert 24-yard field goal, 10:33. Demon Deacons 20–3. Drive: 12 plays, 68 yards, 4:27.
- GT – Eric Rivers 14-yard pass from Haynes King (Aidan Birr kick), 5:39. Demon Deacons 20–10. Drive: 13 plays, 78 yards, 4:49.
- GT – Haynes King 5-yard run (Aidan Birr kick), 0:17. Demon Deacons 20–17. Drive: 10 plays, 65 yards, 3:58.

Fourth quarter

- GT – Aidan Birr 19-yard field goal, 9:45. Tied 20–20. Drive: 7 plays, 53 yards, 3:58.
- WAKE – Connor Calvert 29-yard field goal, 5:08. Demon Deacons 23–20. Drive: 6 plays, 11 yards, 1:41.
- GT – Aidan Birr 33-yard field goal, 0:02. Tied 23–23. Drive: 9 plays, 54 yards, 1:39.

Overtime

- GT – Haynes King 2-yard run (Aidan Birr kick). Yellow Jackets 30–23. Drive: 4 plays, 25 yards.
- WAKE – Demond Claiborne 25-yard run (pass failed). Yellow Jackets 30–29. Drive: 1 play, 25 yards.

| Statistics | GT | WAKE |
|---|---|---|
| First downs | 27 | 20 |
| Plays–yards | 85-411 | 71-445 |
| Rushes–yards | 42-163 | 39-212 |
| Passing yards | 248 | 233 |
| Passing: comp–att–int | 29-43-0 | 14-31-0 |
| Turnovers | 1 | 0 |
| Time of possession | 32:46 | 27:14 |

| Team | Category | Player | Statistics |
|---|---|---|---|
| Georgia Tech | Passing | Haynes King | 28/42, 243 yards, TD |
| Georgia Tech | Rushing | Haynes King | 21 carries, 106 yards, 2 TD |
| Georgia Tech | Receiving | Eric Rivers | 8 receptions, 77 yards, TD |
| Wake Forest | Passing | Robby Ashford | 13/28, 219 yards |
| Wake Forest | Rushing | Demond Claiborne | 21 carries, 119 yards, 2 TD |
| Wake Forest | Receiving | Micah Mays Jr. | 2 receptions, 65 yards |

=== vs Virginia Tech (rivalry) ===
Virginia Tech Hokies (2–4) at No. 13 Georgia Tech Yellow Jackets (5–0) – Game summary

| Quarter | 1 | 2 | 3 | 4 | Total |
|---|---|---|---|---|---|
| Hokies | 0 | 7 | 7 | 6 | 20 |
| No. 13 Yellow Jackets | 15 | 6 | 7 | 7 | 35 |

at Bobby Dodd Stadium • Atlanta, GA

- Date: October 11
- Game time: 3:30 p.m. EDT
- Game weather:
- Game attendance: 50,878
- Referee: Mike Roche
- TV announcers (ACCN): Wes Durham (play-by-play), Steve Addazio (analyst), and Dana Boyle (sideline)

Game information

First quarter

- GT – Haynes King 2-yard run (Haynes King–Malik Rutherford pass), 10:53. Yellow Jackets 8–0. Drive: 9 plays, 80 yards, 4:01.
- GT – Malik Rutherford 9-yard pass from Haynes King (Aidan Birr kick), 4:34. Yellow Jackets 15–0. Drive: 6 plays, 38 yards, 2:36.

Second quarter

- GT – Aidan Birr 25-yard field goal, 9:01. Yellow Jackets 18–0. Drive: 12 plays, 90 yards, 6:16.
- VT – Kyron Drones 32-yard run (John Love kick), 2:52. Yellow Jackets 18–7. Drive: 2 plays, 46 yards, 0:37.
- GT – Aidan Birr 30-yard field goal, 0:04. Yellow Jackets 21–7. Drive: 9 plays, 62 yards, 3:09.

Third quarter

- VT – Ja'Ricous Hairston 33-yard pass from Kyron Drones (John Love kick), 11:34. Yellow Jackets 21–14. Drive: 9 plays, 75 yards, 3:26.
- GT – Malachi Hosley 15-yard run (Aidan Birr kick), 8:23. Yellow Jackets 28–14. Drive: 6 plays, 75 yards, 3:11.

Fourth quarter

- GT – Haynes King 26-yard run (Aidan Birr kick), 11:54. Yellow Jackets 35–14. Drive: 9 plays, 83 yards, 4:47.
- VT – Ja'Ricous Hairston 3-yard pass from Kyron Drones (pass failed), 4:58. Yellow Jackets 35–20. Drive: 11 plays, 75 yards, 6:56.

| Statistics | VT | GT |
|---|---|---|
| First downs | 20 | 28 |
| Plays–yards | 55-367 | 66-481 |
| Rushes–yards | 34-186 | 42-268 |
| Passing yards | 181 | 213 |
| Passing: comp–att–int | 13-21-1 | 20-24-0 |
| Turnovers | 1 | 0 |
| Time of possession | 28:06 | 31:54 |

| Team | Category | Player | Statistics |
|---|---|---|---|
| Virginia Tech | Passing | Kyron Drones | 13/21, 181 yards, 2 TD |
| Virginia Tech | Rushing | Kyron Drones | 16 carries, 83 yards, TD |
| Virginia Tech | Receiving | Ayden Greene | 4 receptions, 72 yards |
| Georgia Tech | Passing | Haynes King | 20/24, 213 yards, TD |
| Georgia Tech | Rushing | Malachi Hosley | 11 carries, 129 yards, TD |
| Georgia Tech | Receiving | Malik Rutherford | 6 receptions, 49 yards, TD |

=== at Duke ===
No. 12 Georgia Tech Yellow Jackets (6–0) at Duke Blue Devils (4–2) – Game summary

| Quarter | 1 | 2 | 3 | 4 | Total |
|---|---|---|---|---|---|
| No. 12 Yellow Jackets | 7 | 0 | 3 | 17 | 27 |
| Blue Devils | 0 | 7 | 3 | 8 | 18 |

at Wallace Wade Stadium • Durham, NC

- Date: October 18
- Game time: 12:00 p.m. EDT
- Game weather: Sunny
- Game attendance: 27,846
- Referee: Justin Elliott
- TV announcers (ESPN): Bob Wischusen (play-by-play), Louis Riddick (analyst), and Kris Budden (sideline)

Game information

First quarter

- GT – Omar Daniels 95-yard fumble return (Aidan Birr kick), 3:46. Yellow Jackets 7–0.

Second quarter

- DUKE – Landen King 20-yard pass from Darian Mensah (Todd Pelino kick), 0:27. Tied 7–7. Drive: 11 plays, 80 yards, 3:59.

Third quarter

- DUKE – Todd Pelino 23-yard field goal, 6:10. Blue Devils 10–7. Drive: 15 plays, 50 yards, 8:43.
- GT – Aidan Birr 40-yard field goal, 2:45. Tied 10–10. Drive: 8 plays, 63 yards, 3:21.

Fourth quarter

- GT – Aidan Birr 23-yard field goal, 11:01. Yellow Jackets 13–10. Drive: 12 plays, 89 yards, 4:35.
- GT – Malachi Hosley 10-yard run (Aidan Birr kick), 4:57. Yellow Jackets 20–10. Drive: 9 plays, 72 yards, 5:01.
- GT – Haynes King 28-yard run (Aidan Birr kick), 2:10. Yellow Jackets 27–10. Drive: 4 plays, 71 yards, 0:42.
- DUKE – Sahmir Hagans 19-yard pass from Darian Mensah (Darian Mensah–Cooper Barkate pass), 1:13. Yellow Jackets 27–18. Drive: 7 plays, 75 yards, 0:57.

| Statistics | GT | DUKE |
|---|---|---|
| First downs | 21 | 26 |
| Plays–yards | 57-376 | 76-441 |
| Rushes–yards | 36-171 | 32-68 |
| Passing yards | 205 | 373 |
| Passing: comp–att–int | 14-21-0 | 32-44-0 |
| Turnovers | 0 | 1 |
| Time of possession | 26:31 | 33:29 |

| Team | Category | Player | Statistics |
|---|---|---|---|
| Georgia Tech | Passing | Haynes King | 14/21, 205 yards |
| Georgia Tech | Rushing | Haynes King | 14 carries, 120 yards, TD |
| Georgia Tech | Receiving | Isiah Canion | 3 receptions, 56 yards |
| Duke | Passing | Darian Mensah | 32/44, 373 yards, 2 TD |
| Duke | Rushing | Nate Sheppard | 15 carries, 50 yards |
| Duke | Receiving | Cooper Barkate | 13 receptions, 172 yards |

=== vs Syracuse ===
Syracuse Orange (3–4) at No. 7 Georgia Tech Yellow Jackets (7–0) – Game summary

| Quarter | 1 | 2 | 3 | 4 | Total |
|---|---|---|---|---|---|
| Orange | 3 | 0 | 7 | 6 | 16 |
| No. 7 Yellow Jackets | 3 | 17 | 14 | 7 | 41 |

at Bobby Dodd Stadium • Atlanta, GA

- Date: October 25
- Game time: 12:00 p.m. EDT
- Game weather:
- Game attendance: 51,913
- Referee: Jon Noli
- TV announcers (ESPN): Dave Pasch (play-by-play), Dusty Dvoracek (analyst), and Taylor McGregor (sideline)

Game information

First quarter

- SYR – Tripp Woody 27-yard field goal, 10:59. Orange 3–0. Drive: 5 plays, 33 yards, 3:23.
- GT – Aidan Birr 20-yard field goal, 6:16. Tied 3–3. Drive: 11 plays, 72 yards, 4:43.

Second quarter

- GT – Josh Beetham 21-yard pass from Haynes King (Aidan Birr kick), 12:05. Yellow Jackets 10–3. Drive: 10 plays, 68 yards, 3:55.
- GT – Josh Beetham 13-yard pass from Haynes King (Aidan Birr kick), 4:01. Yellow Jackets 17–3. Drive: 9 plays, 65 yards, 3:47.
- GT – Aidan Birr 22-yard field goal, 0:01. Yellow Jackets 20–3. Drive: 6 plays, 31 yards, 0:44.

Third quarter

- SYR – Darrell Gill Jr. 34-yard pass from Rickie Collins (Tripp Woody kick), 14:19. Yellow Jackets 20–10. Drive: 2 plays, 75 yards, 0:41.
- GT – Dean Patterson 37-yard pass from Haynes King (Aidan Birr kick), 11:02. Yellow Jackets 27–10. Drive: 7 plays, 75 yards, 3:17.
- GT – Haynes King 2-yard run (Aidan Birr kick), 6:01. Yellow Jackets 34–10. Drive: 5 plays, 65 yards, 2:39.

Fourth quarter

- SYR – Will Nixon 1-yard run (pass failed), 7:58. Yellow Jackets 34–16. Drive: 16 plays, 89 yards, 5:39.
- GT – Haynes King 4-yard run (Aidan Birr kick), 3:47. Yellow Jackets 41–16. Drive: 7 plays, 46 yards, 4:10.

| Statistics | SYR | GT |
|---|---|---|
| First downs | 17 | 27 |
| Plays–yards | 63-381 | 68-543 |
| Rushes–yards | 34-157 | 37-239 |
| Passing yards | 224 | 304 |
| Passing: comp–att–int | 19-29-0 | 25-31-0 |
| Turnovers | 1 | 1 |
| Time of possession | 28:20 | 29:34 |

| Team | Category | Player | Statistics |
|---|---|---|---|
| Syracuse | Passing | Rickie Collins | 17/29, 224 yards, TD |
| Syracuse | Rushing | Yasin Willis | 10 carries, 76 yards |
| Syracuse | Receiving | Darrell Gill Jr. | 5 receptions, 79 yards, TD |
| Georgia Tech | Passing | Haynes King | 25/31, 304 yards, 3 TD |
| Georgia Tech | Rushing | Haynes King | 12 carries, 91 yards, 2 TD |
| Georgia Tech | Receiving | Jordan Allen | 6 receptions, 67 yards |

=== at NC State ===
No. 8 Georgia Tech Yellow Jackets (8–0) at NC State Wolfpack (4–4) – Game summary

| Quarter | 1 | 2 | 3 | 4 | Total |
|---|---|---|---|---|---|
| No. 8 Yellow Jackets | 7 | 10 | 13 | 6 | 36 |
| Wolfpack | 14 | 10 | 14 | 10 | 48 |

at Carter-Finley Stadium • Raleigh, NC

- Date: November 1
- Game time: 7:30 p.m. EDT
- Game weather: Cloudy
- Game attendance: 56,919
- Referee: Adam Savoie
- TV announcers (ESPN2): Matt Schumacker (play-by-play), Sam Acho (analyst), and Taylor Davis (sideline)

Game information

First quarter

- NCSU – Cody Hardy 5-yard pass from CJ Bailey (Kanoah Vinesett kick), 8:49. Wolfpack 7–0. Drive: 10 plays, 75 yards, 6:11.
- GT – Haynes King 12-yard run (Aidan Birr kick), 6:49. Tied 7–7. Drive: 4 plays, 75 yards, 2:00.
- NCSU – CJ Bailey 11-yard run (Kanoah Vinesett kick), 1:59. Wolfpack 14–7. Drive: 10 plays, 78 yards, 4:45.

Second quarter

- GT – Aidan Birr 43-yard field goal, 13:49. Wolfpack 14–10. Drive: 9 plays, 44 yards, 3:05.
- GT – J.T. Byrne 2-yard pass from Haynes King (Aidan Birr kick), 6:25. Yellow Jackets 17–14. Drive: 10 plays, 60 yards, 5:26.
- NCSU – Cody Hardy fumble return (Kanoah Vinesett kick), 3:07. Wolfpack 21–17. Drive: 7 plays, 75 yards, 3:24.
- NCSU – Kanoah Vinesett 34-yard field goal, 0:00. Wolfpack 24–17. Drive: 8 plays, 46 yards, 0:56.

Third quarter

- GT – Aidan Birr 23-yard field goal, 8:10. Wolfpack 24–20. Drive: 12 plays, 70 yards, 6:50.
- NCSU – Will Wilson 1-yard run (Kanoah Vinesett kick), 7:00. Wolfpack 31–20. Drive: 3 plays, 75 yards, 1:10.
- GT – Aidan Birr 29-yard field goal, 4:52. Wolfpack 31–23. Drive: 5 plays, 71 yards, 2:04.
- NCSU – Teddy Hoffman 55-yard pass from CJ Bailey (Kanoah Vinesett kick), 2:49. Wolfpack 38–23. Drive: 5 plays, 80 yards, 1:58.
- GT – Haynes King 3-yard run (Aidan Birr kick), 0:08. Wolfpack 38–30. Drive: 7 plays, 75 yards, 2:41.

Fourth quarter

- NCSU – Kanoah Vinesett 37-yard field goal, 9:46. Wolfpack 41–30. Drive: 11 plays, 55 yards, 5:22.
- NCSU – Jayden Scott 30-yard run (Kanoah Vinesett kick), 4:07. Wolfpack 48–30. Drive: 9 plays, 76 yards, 4:18.
- GT – Zion Taylor 16-yard pass from Haynes King (pass failed), 2:22. Wolfpack 48–36. Drive: 8 plays, 76 yards, 1:40.

| Statistics | GT | NCSU |
|---|---|---|
| First downs | 30 | 26 |
| Plays–yards | 70-559 | 67-583 |
| Rushes–yards | 33-151 | 34-243 |
| Passing yards | 408 | 340 |
| Passing: comp–att–int | 25-37-1 | 24-33-0 |
| Turnovers | 1 | 0 |
| Time of possession | 28:35 | 31:25 |

| Team | Category | Player | Statistics |
|---|---|---|---|
| Georgia Tech | Passing | Haynes King | 25/35, 408 yards, 2 TD |
| Georgia Tech | Rushing | Haynes King | 20 carries, 103 yards, 2 TD |
| Georgia Tech | Receiving | Jordan Allen | 5 receptions, 110 yards |
| NC State | Passing | CJ Bailey | 24/32, 340 yards, 2 TD |
| NC State | Rushing | Jayden Scott | 24 carries, 196 yards, TD |
| NC State | Receiving | Teddy Hoffman | 3 receptions, 74 yards, TD |

=== at Boston College ===
No. 16 Georgia Tech Yellow Jackets (8–1) at Boston College Eagles (1-9) – Game summary

| Quarter | 1 | 2 | 3 | 4 | Total |
|---|---|---|---|---|---|
| No. 16 Yellow Jackets | 7 | 7 | 3 | 19 | 36 |
| Eagles | 0 | 14 | 14 | 6 | 34 |

at Alumni Stadium • Chestnut Hill, MA

- Date: November 15
- Game time: 3:30 p.m. EST
- Game weather: Sunny, 46 °F (8 °C)
- Game attendance: 37,879
- Referee: Jerry Magallanes
- TV announcers (ACCN): Wes Durham (play-by-play), Steve Addazio (analyst), and Dana Boyle (sideline)

Game information

First quarter

- GT – Malachi Hosley 27-yard run (Aidan Birr kick), 4:59. Yellow Jackets 7–0. Drive: 7 plays, 83 yards, 3:36.

Second quarter

- BC – Turbo Richard 1-yard run (Luca Lombardo kick), 14:19. Tied 7–7. Drive: 11 plays, 75 yards, 5:40.
- GT – Malik Rutherford 71-yard pass from Haynes King (Aidan Birr kick), 9:44. Yellow Jacks 14–7. Drive: 4 plays, 84 yards, 1:58.
- BC – Kaelen Chudzinski 3-yard pass from Dylan Lonergan (Luca Lombardo kick), 0:22. Tied 14–14. Drive: 10 plays, 93 yards, 1:04.

Third quarter

- BC – Jordan McDonald 14-yard run (Luca Lombardo kick), 12:05. Eagles 21–14. Drive: 7 plays, 75 yards, 2:55.
- GT – Aidan Birr 34-yard field goal, 4:35. Eagles 21–17. Drive: 14 plays, 55 yards, 7:23.
- BC – Reed Harris 18-yard pass from Dylan Lonergan (Luca Lombardo kick), 1:19. Eagles 28–17. Drive: 6 plays, 75 yards, 3:16.

Fourth quarter

- GT – Aidan Birr 26-yard field goal, 13:52. Eagles 28–20. Drive: 10 plays, 66 yards, 2:27.
- GT – Jamal Haynes 2-yard run (run failed), 7:33. Eagles 28–26. Drive: 9 plays, 78 yards, 3:47.
- GT – Jordan Allen 54-yard run (Aidan Birr kick), 6:14. Yellow Jackets 33–28. Drive: 1 play, 54 yards, 0:10.
- BC – Turbo Richard 43-yard run (pass failed), 4:09. Eagles 34–33. Drive: 5 plays, 75 yards, 2:05.
- GT – Aidan Birr 23-yard field goal, 0:11. Yellow Jackets 36–34. Drive: 13 plays, 68 yards, 3:58.

| Statistics | GT | BC |
|---|---|---|
| First downs | 30 | 24 |
| Plays–yards | 76–628 | 66–537 |
| Rushes–yards | 42–257 | 26–175 |
| Passing yards | 371 | 362 |
| Passing: comp–att–int | 26–34–0 | 26–40–0 |
| Turnovers | 1 | 0 |
| Time of possession | 32:44 | 27:16 |

| Team | Category | Player | Statistics |
|---|---|---|---|
| Georgia Tech | Passing | Haynes King | 26/34, 371 yards, TD |
| Georgia Tech | Rushing | Malachi Hosley | 15 carries, 107 yards, TD |
| Georgia Tech | Receiving | Malik Rutherford | 5 receptions, 121 yards, TD |
| Boston College | Passing | Dylan Lonergan | 26/40, 362 yards, 2 TD |
| Boston College | Rushing | Turbo Richard | 11 carries, 141 yards, 2 TD |
| Boston College | Receiving | Reed Harris | 5 receptions, 142 yards, TD |

=== vs. Pittsburgh ===
Pittsburgh Panthers (7–3) at No. 16 Georgia Tech Yellow Jackets (9–1) – Game summary

| Quarter | 1 | 2 | 3 | 4 | Total |
|---|---|---|---|---|---|
| Panthers | 21 | 7 | 7 | 7 | 42 |
| No. 16 Yellow Jackets | 0 | 14 | 0 | 14 | 28 |

at Bobby Dodd Stadium • Atlanta, GA

- Date: November 22
- Game time: 7:00 p.m.
- Game weather: Sunny, 67 °F (19 °C)
- Game attendance: 52,413
- Referee: Adam Savoie
- TV announcers (ESPN): Dave Pasch (play-by-play), Dusty Dvoracek (analyst), and Taylor McGregor (sideline)

Game information

First quarter

- PITT – Kenny Johnson 31-yard pass from Mason Heintschel (Sam Carpenter kick), 7:49. Panthers 7–0. Drive: 3 plays, 69 yards, 0:57.
- PITT – Justin Holmes 19-yard pass from Mason Heintschel (Sam Carpenter kick), 3:13. Panthers 14–0. Drive: 6 plays, 55 yards, 2:31.
- PITT – Juelz Goff 1-yard run (Sam Carpenter kick), 0:39. Panthers 21–0. Drive: 4 plays, 28 yards, 1:55.

Second quarter

- PITT – Mason Heintschel 3-yard run (Sam Carpenter kick), 11:47. Panthers 28–0. Drive: 8 plays, 69 yards, 3:13.
- GT – Haynes King 5-yard run (Aidan Birr kick), 4:45. Panthers 28–7. Drive: 15 plays, 75 yards, 6:57.
- GT – Isiah Canion 5-yard pass from Haynes King (Aidan Birr kick), 1:08. Panthers 28–14. Drive: 4 plays, 30 yards, 1:01.

Third quarter

- PITT – Braylan Lovelace 100-yard interception return (Sam Carpenter kick), 5:55. Panthers 35–14.

Fourth quarter

- GT – Jamal Haynes 4-yard run (Aidan Birr kick), 8:46. Panthers 35–21. Drive: 7 plays, 63 yards, 3:10.
- GT – Isiah Canion 5-yard pass from Haynes King (Aidan Birr kick), 4:51. Panthers 35–28. Drive: 6 plays, 38 yards, 2:10.
- PITT – Ja'Kyrian Turner 56-yard run (Sam Carpenter kick), 2:41. Panthers 42–28. Drive: 4 plays, 75 yards, 2:10.

| Statistics | PITT | GT |
|---|---|---|
| First downs | 22 | 21 |
| Plays–yards | 67-412 | 74-378 |
| Rushes–yards | 40-186 | 33-121 |
| Passing yards | 226 | 257 |
| Passing: comp–att–int | 20-27-0 | 27-41-2 |
| Turnovers | 0 | 2 |
| Time of possession | 29:35 | 30:25 |

| Team | Category | Player | Statistics |
|---|---|---|---|
| Pittsburgh | Passing | Mason Heintschel | 20/27, 226 yards, 2 TD |
| Pittsburgh | Rushing | Ja'Kyrian Turner | 21 carries, 201 yards, TD |
| Pittsburgh | Receiving | Kenny Johnson | 6 receptions, 91 yards, TD |
| Georgia Tech | Passing | Haynes King | 27/41, 257 yards, 2 TD, 2 INT |
| Georgia Tech | Rushing | Haynes King | 20 carries, 76 yards, TD |
| Georgia Tech | Receiving | Malik Rutherford | 6 receptions, 68 yards |

=== vs No. 4 Georgia (Clean, Old-Fashioned Hate) ===
For the first time since 1913, this season's Clean, Old-Fashioned Hate rivalry game will not be played at either Georgia or Georgia Tech; it will instead take place at Mercedes-Benz Stadium, which paid Georgia Tech $10 million to host the game. Batt said the money would be "a transformative lift for Tech athletics", and promised that Tech would host the 2027 Georgia game on-campus.

The game will also be the first of a new annual college football series held at the Benz, called the Invesco QQQ Atlanta Gridiron Classic.

Invesco QQQ Atlanta Gridiron Classic
No. 4 Georgia Bulldogs (10–1) vs. No. 23 Georgia Tech Yellow Jackets (9–2) – Game summary

| Quarter | 1 | 2 | 3 | 4 | Total |
|---|---|---|---|---|---|
| No. 4 Bulldogs | 0 | 13 | 0 | 3 | 16 |
| No. 23 Yellow Jackets | 3 | 0 | 3 | 3 | 9 |

at Mercedes-Benz Stadium • Atlanta, GA

- Date: November 28
- Game time: 3:30 p.m. EST
- Game weather: Sunny • Temperature: 70 °F (21 °C)
- Game attendance: 73,728
- Referee: Justin Elliot
- TV announcers (ABC): Joe Tessitore (play-by-play), Jesse Palmer (analyst), and Katie George (sideline)

Game information

First quarter

- (1:20) GT – Aidan Birr 30-yard field goal (Drive: 7 plays, 24 yards, 4:27; Georgia Tech 3–0)

Second quarter

- (9:42) UGA – Peyton Woodring 22-yard field goal (Drive: 13 plays, 71 yards, 6:38; Tied 3–3)
- (4:35) UGA – Zachariah Branch 7-yard pass from Gunner Stockton, Peyton Woodring kick (Drive: 9 plays, 55 yards, 3:50; Georgia 10–3)
- (0:01) UGA – Peyton Woodring 30-yard field goal (Drive: 9 plays, 55 yards, 3:14; Georgia 13–3)

Third quarter

- (4:33) GT – Aidan Birr 44-yard field goal (Drive: 6 plays, 27 yards, 3:02; Georgia 13–6)

Fourth quarter

- (14:10) UGA – Peyton Woodring 50-yard field goal (Drive: 11 plays, 42 yards, 5:23; Georgia 16–6)
- (3:30) GT – Aidan Birr 41-yard field goal (Drive: 7 plays, 64 yards, 2:36; Georgia 16–9)

| Statistics | UGA | GT |
|---|---|---|
| First downs | 19 | 14 |
| Plays–yards | 67-260 | 50-250 |
| Rushes–yards | 46-190 | 23-69 |
| Passing yards | 70 | 181 |
| Passing: comp–att–int | 11-21-1 | 19-27-1 |
| Turnovers | 1 | 1 |
| Time of possession | 35:21 | 24:39 |

| Team | Category | Player | Statistics |
|---|---|---|---|
| Georgia | Passing | Gunner Stockton | 11/12, 70 yards, TD, INT |
| Georgia | Rushing | Nate Frazier | 16 carries, 108 yards |
| Georgia | Receiving | Zachariah Branch | 5 receptions, 53 yards, TD |
| Georgia Tech | Passing | Haynes King | 19/21, 181 yards, INT |
| Georgia Tech | Rushing | Haynes King | 10 carries, 39 yards |
| Georgia Tech | Receiving | Isiah Canion | 4 receptions, 54 yards |

=== vs No. 12 BYU (Pop-Tarts Bowl) ===
2025 Pop-Tarts Bowl
No. 22 Georgia Tech Yellow Jackets (9–3) vs No. 12 BYU Cougars (11–2) – Game summary

| Quarter | 1 | 2 | 3 | 4 | Total |
|---|---|---|---|---|---|
| No. 22 Yellow Jackets | 7 | 14 | 0 | 0 | 21 |
| No. 12 Cougars | 7 | 3 | 0 | 15 | 25 |

at Camping World Stadium • Orlando, FL

- Date: December 27
- Game time: 3:30 p.m. EST
- Game weather: Clear • Temperature: 76 °F (24 °C) • Wind: 7 mph (11 km/h) southeast
- Game attendance: 34,126
- Referee: Chris Coyte
- TV announcers (ABC): Mark Jones (play-by-play), Roddy Jones (analyst) and Quint Kessenich (sideline)

Game information

First quarter

- (4:56) BYU – Chase Roberts 7-yard pass from Bear Bachmeier (Will Ferrin kick) (Drive: 5 plays, 62 yards, 2:49; BYU 7–0)
- (0:20) GT – Trelain Maddox 3-yard run (Aidan Birr kick) (Drive: 10 plays, 75 yards, 4:36; Tied 7–7)

Second quarter

- (9:49) BYU – Will Ferrin 22-yard field goal (Drive: 12 plays, 71 yards, 5:31; BYU 10–7)
- (5:28) GT – Eric Rivers 5-yard pass from Haynes King (Aidan Birr kick) (Drive: 10 plays, 76 yards, 4:14; GT 14–10)
- (5:15) GT – J. T. Byrne 6-yard pass from Haynes King (Aidan Birr kick) (Drive: 1 play, 6 yards, 0:04; GT 21–10)

Third quarter

No scoring plays

Fourth quarter

- (11:13) BYU – Enoch Nawahine 2-yard run (Bear Bachmeier run for two-point conversion) (Drive: 11 plays, 80 yards, 4:42; GT 21–18)
- (2:00) BYU – Jovesa Damuni 4-yard run (Will Ferrin kick) (Drive: 9 plays, 70 yards, 3:44; BYU 25–21)

| Statistics | GT | BYU |
|---|---|---|
| First downs | 21 | 26 |
| Plays–yards | 68–401 | 63–425 |
| Rushes–yards | 28–131 | 24–100 |
| Passing yards | 270 | 325 |
| Passing: comp–att–int | 22–40–1 | 27–39–1 |
| Turnovers | 2 | 2 |
| Time of possession | 28:49 | 31:11 |

| Team | Category | Player | Statistics |
|---|---|---|---|
| Georgia Tech | Passing | Haynes King | 22/40, 254 yards, 2 TD, INT |
| Georgia Tech | Rushing | Malachi Mosley | 11 carries, 63 yards |
| Georgia Tech | Receiving | Malik Rutherford | 8 receptions, 105 yards |
| BYU | Passing | Bear Bachmeier | 27/38, 325 yards, TD, INT |
| BYU | Rushing | Jovesa Damuni | 7 carries, 48 yards, TD |
| BYU | Receiving | Carsen Ryan | 8 receptions, 120 yards |

== Roster ==
2025 Georgia Tech Yellow Jackets football team roster
Players
Coaches
Offense

| Pos. | # | Name | Class |
|---|---|---|---|
| RB | 0 | Malachi Hosley | Jr |
| RB | 1 | Jamal Haynes | RSr |
| WR | 3 | Eric Rivers | RSr |
| WR | 4 | Isiah Canion | So |
| WR | 6 | Debron Gatling | Fr |
| WR | 7 | Bailey Stockton | RSo |
| WR | 8 | Malik Rutherford | RSr |
| WR | 9 | Zion Taylor | RSo |
| QB | 10 | Haynes King | RSr |
| WR | 11 | Dean Patterson | RSr |
| QB | 12 | Aaron Philo | Fr |
| WR | 13 | Rahkeem Smith | Sr |
| QB | 14 | Graham Knowles | Fr |
| TE | 15 | Luke Harpring | Fr |
| QB | 16 | Grady Adamson | Fr |
| TE | 17 | Josh Beetham | RSr |
| QB | 18 | Ben Guthrie | RSo |
| RB | 20 | J.P. Powell | Fr |
| RB | 21 | Daylon Gordon | RSr |
| RB | 24 | Shane Marshall | Fr |
| RB | 27 | Chad Alexander | Jr |
| RB | 28 | Trelain Maddox | Fr |
| TE | 44 | Connor Roush | Fr |
| OL | 50 | Tana Alo-Tupuola | So |
| OL | 51 | Kevin Peay Jr. | Fr |
| OL | 52 | Harrison Moore | So |
| OL | 54 | Jimmy Bryson | Fr |
| OL | 55 | Xavier Canales | Fr |
| OL | 56 | Jacob Benjamin | RSo |
| OL | 57 | Jakolby Jones | So |
| OL | 64 | Ryan Purves | RJr |
| OL | 65 | Joshua Ruder | RSo |
| OL | 66 | Will Reed | RSr |
| OL | 67 | Joe Fusile | RSr |
| OL | 69 | Josh Petty | Fr |
| OL | 70 | Jameson Riggs | Fr |
| OL | 71 | Peyton Joseph | Fr |
| OL | 72 | Malachi Carney | RJr |
| OL | 74 | Benjamin Galloway | RSo |
| OL | 75 | Andrew Rosinski | Fr |
| OL | 77 | Keylan Rutledge | Sr |
| OL | 78 | Ethan Mackenny | Jr |
| OL | 79 | Jordan Floyd | Fr |
| TE | 80 | Brett Seither | RSr |
| WR | 81 | Cal Faulkner | Fr |
| TE | 83 | Blake Ragsdale | Fr |
| WR | 84 | Evan Haynes | Fr |
| WR | 85 | Jordan Allen | Fr |
| TE | 86 | Kevin Roche Jr. | Fr |
| WR | 87 | Jamauri Brice | Fr |
| TE | 88 | J.T. Byrne | RSr |
| WR | 89 | Chris Elko | RSo |

Defense

| Pos. | # | Name | Class |
|---|---|---|---|
| LB | 0 | Melvin Jordan IV | RJr |
| LB | 2 | E. J. Lightsey | RJr |
| DB | 3 | Ahmari Harvey | RSr |
| DB | 4 | Daiquan White | Jr |
| DB | 5 | Clayton Powell-Lee | Sr |
| DB | 6 | Rodney Shelley | Sr |
| DL | 8 | Jordan Boyd | So |
| DB | 9 | Omar Daniels | RSr |
| DL | 11 | Brayden Manley | Jr |
| DB | 13 | Savion Riley | RJr |
| LB | 15 | Tah'j Butler | So |
| DB | 16 | Kelvin Hill | So |
| LB | 17 | Jackson Hamilton | RSr |
| DB | 18 | Troy Stevenson IV | Fr |
| DB | 20 | Christian Pritchett | So |
| DB | 21 | Elgin Sessions | Fr |
| DB | 22 | D. J. Moore | RJr |
| DB | 23 | Zachary Tobe | Jr |
| DL | 24 | Ronald Triplette | RSr |
| DB | 25 | Dalen Penson | Fr |
| DB | 26 | Ben Hollerbach | RJr |
| DB | 27 | Tae Harris | Fr |
| LB | 28 | Austin Dean | RSr |
| DB | 29 | Nico Dowdell | RSo |
| DB | 29 | Jon Mitchell | Fr |
| DB | 30 | Lawson Pritchett | Fr |
| DB | 31 | Felix Fenton | Fr |
| LB | 31 | Jonorian Foots | RSo |
| DB | 32 | Jayden Barr | Fr |
| DL | 33 | Matthew Alexander | RSr |
| LB | 34 | Myles Forristall | RSo |
| LB | 35 | Cayman Spaulding | Jr |
| DB, LS | 36 | Kace Adams | RSo |
| DB | 37 | Joseph Moseley | Fr |
| DB | 38 | A. J. Cheeks | RSo |
| DB | 39 | Will Kiker | RSo |
| LB | 44 | Kyle Efford | RJr |
| LB | 45 | Bayler Duncan | Fr |
| DL | 49 | Chuma Okoye | RSo |
| LB | 53 | Jack Collins | RSo |
| DL | 55 | Christian Garrett | Fr |
| DL | 88 | A.J. Hoffler | Jr |
| DL | 90 | Blake Belin | Fr |
| DL | 91 | Andre Fuller Jr. | Fr |
| LB | 93 | Drew Cohen | Fr |
| DL | 94 | Derry Norris Jr. | Fr |
| DL | 95 | Jason Moore | RSr |
| DL | 96 | Shymeik Jones | RSo |
| DL | 97 | Landen Marshall | Fr |
| DL | 98 | Amontrae Bradford | So |
| DL | 99 | Jordan van den Berg | RSr |

Special teams

| Pos. | # | Name | Class |
|---|---|---|---|
| K | 33 | Aidan Birr | RJr |
| P, K | 39 | James Whatley | Fr |
| P | 40 | Joshua Taylor | RSo |
| K | 41 | Landon Shaffer | Fr |
| P | 47 | Marshall Nichols | Sr |
| LS | 48 | Joseph Stoever | RSo |
| LS | 49 | Ronnie Thomas | RJr |

Head coach

- Brent Key

Coordinators/assistant coaches

- Buster Faulkner – Offensive coordinator
- Chris Weinke – Assistant head coach, co-offensive coordinator, quarterbacks
- Norval McKenzie – Running backs, run game coordinator
- Geep Wade – Offensive line
- Trent McKnight – Wide receivers
- Blake Gideon – Defensive coordinator
- Jess Simpson – Defensive line
- Cory Peoples – Defensive backs
- Kyle Pope – Outside linebackers, defensive ends
- Darius Eubanks – Linebackers
- Kobie Jones – Cornerbacks
- Nathan Brock – Tight ends
- Dylan Dockery – H-Backs
- Brendan Farrell – Special Teams, Game Management
- Tim Salem – Special Teams
- Brian Bohannon – Senior offensive analyst
- Mike Polly – Assistant offensive line
- Emil Ekiyor Jr. – Quality control assistant

Legend

- (C) Team captain
- (S) Suspended
- (I) Ineligible
- Injured
- Redshirt

Roster
Last update: 7 May 2025
