= Johntay Cook =

American football player (born 2004)

Johntay Cook II
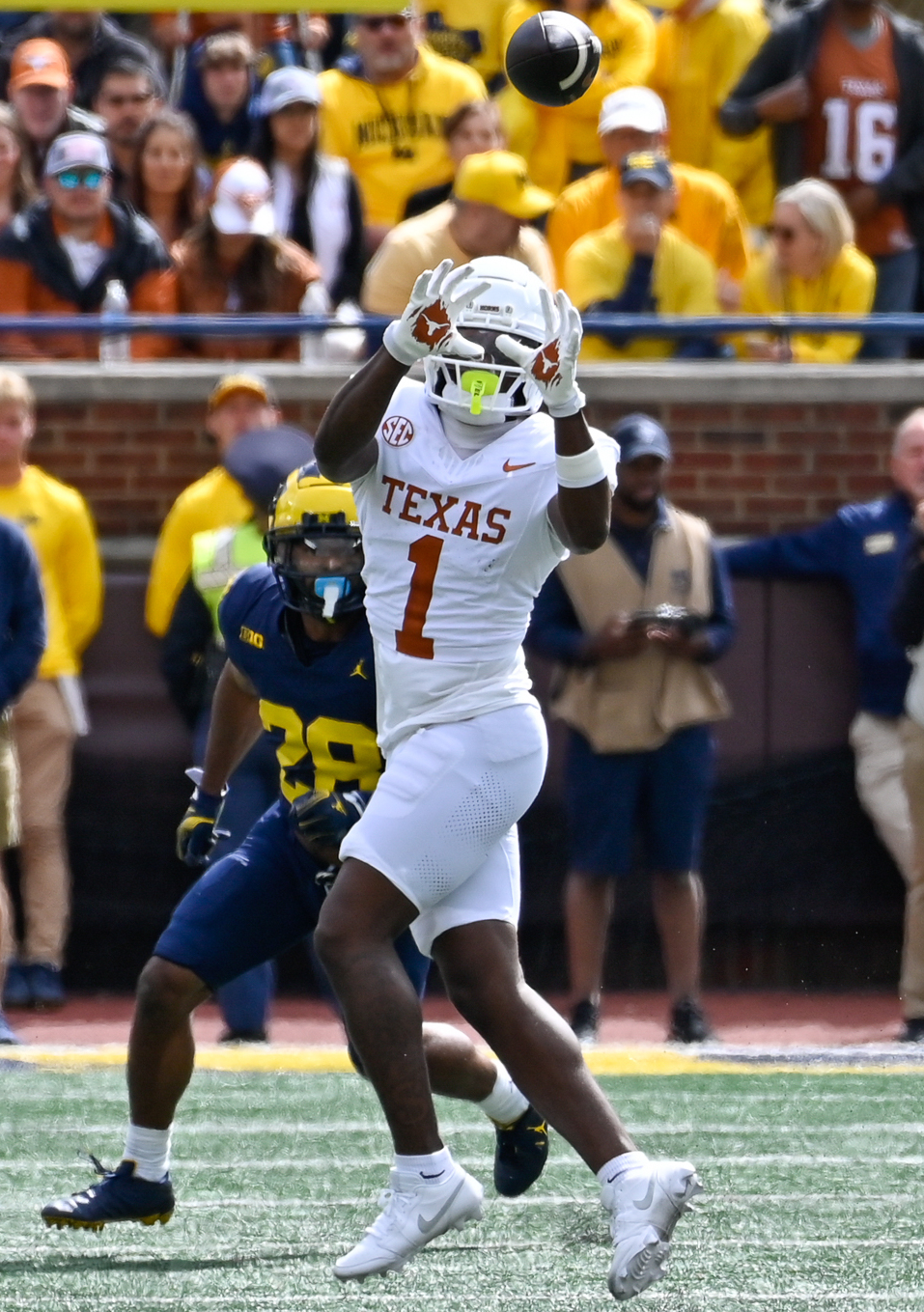
- Cook with Texas in 2024

No. 0 – Ole Miss Rebels
- Position: Wide receiver
- Class: Senior

Personal information
- Born: December 28, 2004 (age 21)
- Listed height: 5 ft 11 in (1.80 m)
- Listed weight: 190 lb (86 kg)

Career information
- High school: DeSoto (DeSoto, Texas)
- College: Texas (2023–2024); Syracuse (2025); Ole Miss (2026–present)
- Stats at ESPN

Johntay Cook II (born December 28, 2004) is an American college football wide receiver for the Ole Miss Rebels. He previously played for the Syracuse Orange and Texas Longhorns.

== Early life ==
Cook II attended DeSoto High School in DeSoto, Texas. As a senior in 2022, he was the Dallas Morning News Offensive Player of the Year after he had 84 receptions for 1,469 yards and 22 touchdowns. For his career, he had 165 receptions for 2,965 receiving yards and 50 touchdowns. Cook II was selected to play in the 2023 Under Armour All-America Game. A five-star recruit, he committed to the University of Texas at Austin to play college football.

== College career ==
=== Texas ===
Cook II was a backup his first year at Texas in 2023. In his first career game, he had two receptions for 26 yards.

=== Washington ===
In the middle of the 2024/2025 season, Cook would enter the transfer before subsequently announcing his commitment to the Washington Huskies on December 28th, 2024. On January 14th, 2025, it was announced that Cook and Washington parted ways.

=== Syracuse Orange ===
On May 1, 2025, Cook committed to the Syracuse Orange. In his lone season at Syracuse, he played and started in all 12 games, recording 45 receptions for 549 yards and two touchdowns.

=== Ole Miss ===
On January 16, 2026, Cook committed to Ole Miss.

=== College statistics ===
Year	Team	Games		Receiving				Rushing		
Year	Team	GP	GS	Rec	Yds	Avg	TD	Att	Yds	TD
2023	Texas	14	0	8	136	17.0	0	0	0	0
2024	Texas	6	0	8	137	17.1	2	0	0	0
2025	Syracuse	12	12	45	549	12.2	2	1	18	0
Career		32	12	61	822	13.5	4	1	18	0

== Arrests ==
On February 6, 2025, Cook was charged with misdemeanor, theft, and interfering with public duties in Tarrant County, where he was booked in the Lon Evans Corrections Center.

Cook was arrested for a second time in two weeks on February 14. Cook was arrested and charged with possession of less than two ounces of marijuana in Grayson County, according to multiple reports.
