= Joseph Filardi =

American football player (born 2007)

No. 13 – Syracuse Orange
- Position: Quarterback
- Class: Sophomore

Personal information
- Born: April 24, 2007 (age 19)
- Listed height: 6 ft 1 in (1.85 m)
- Listed weight: 195 lb (88 kg)

Career information
- High school: Half Hollow Hills West (Dix Hills, New York)
- College: Syracuse (2025–present)
- Stats at ESPN

Joseph Robert Filardi (born April 24, 2007) is an American multi-sport athlete who plays quarterback for the Syracuse Orange football team and defender for the Syracuse Orange lacrosse team.

== Early life ==
Filardi attended and played high school football at Half Hollow Hills West in Dix Hills, New York. As a senior, he threw for 3,102 yards and 43 touchdowns while also rushing for 1,204 yards and 12 touchdowns. Filardi earned the Carl A. Hansen Award for Suffolk County's top player. He also plays lacrosse, where as a Junior he scored 30 goals and 30 assists and was named a high school All-American. Filardi was ranked as the #52 recruit in the 2025 class according to Inside Lacrosse. He committed to play college lacrosse at Syracuse University, graduating one semester early.

== College career ==
Although Filardi initially intended to play lacrosse at Syracuse, he also joined the football team as a walk-on. He made his first appearance and start on October 31, 2025 against North Carolina, where he completed 4 of 18 passes for 39 yards.

=== College football statistics ===
Legend
**Bold**	Career high

Season	Team	Games			Passing								Rushing			
Season	Team	GP	GS	Record	Cmp	Att	Pct	Yds	Y/A	TD	Int	Rtg	Att	Yds	Y/A	TD
2025	Syracuse	4	3	0–3	34	65	47.7	226	3.5	1	3	72.7	30	87	2.9	1
Career		4	3	0–3	34	65	47.7	226	3.5	1	3	72.7	30	87	2.9	1

=== College lacrosse statistics ===
Year	Team	GP	G	A
2026	Syracuse	10	0	0
Career		10	0	0
