= Antoine Deslauriers =

Canadian player of American football

No. 5 – Syracuse Orange
- Position: Linebacker
- Class: Sophomore

Personal information
- Born: Montreal, Quebec, Canada
- Listed height: 6 ft 1 in (1.85 m)
- Listed weight: 235 lb (107 kg)

Career information
- High school: Collège Laval (Saint-Vincent-de-Paul, Quebec); Rabun Gap-Nacoochee (Rabun County, Georgia)
- College: Syracuse (2025–present)

Antoine Deslauriers is a Canadian college football linebacker for the Syracuse Orange.

== Early life ==
Deslauriers was born in Montreal, Quebec, where he grew up. He grew up playing Canadian football and played five years in high school at Collège Laval. His play in Canada received the attention of American schools, and in 2023 he moved to the U.S. to play high school football at Rabun Gap-Nacoochee School in Georgia. In his first season, he was named first-team all-conference after posting 72 tackles, 18 tackles-for-loss (TFLs) and two sacks. Deslauriers, a team captain, won a state championship in 2024 and was named first-team all-conference and all-state after totaling 135 tackles, 21 TFLs and four sacks. A three-star recruit and ranked the 18th-best linebacker prospect nationally by ESPN, he signed to play college football for the Syracuse Orange.

== College career ==
Deslauriers won a starting role for Syracuse as a true freshman in 2025. He started 11 of 12 games, recording 60 tackles which placed second on the team. At the conclusion of the 2025 season, he was named a True Freshman All-American by On3.com.
