= Collège Laval =

Coordinates: 45.615°N 73.651°W

Location
- 1275, avenue du Collège, Laval; Laval; Canada

Information
- School type: Private Secondary
- Founded: 1854
- Principal: Caroline Claveau
- Grades: 7–11
- Enrollment: 2000
- Language: French
- Website: collegelaval.ca

Collège Laval (French pronunciation: [kɔlɛʒ laval]) is a private French-language high school located in Saint-Vincent-de-Paul, Laval, Quebec, in Canada. Today the college has an enrollment of 2000 students, and over 10,000 in alumni. The school is a member of the Quebec-based Fédération des établissements d'enseignement privés.

== History ==
It was established in 1854 and has been under the management of Marist Brothers since 1888.

In 1996 it started accepting female students after it had been a male-only institution since its founding. A school uniform is worn by all students.
