= Darrell Gill Jr. =

American football player (born 2004)

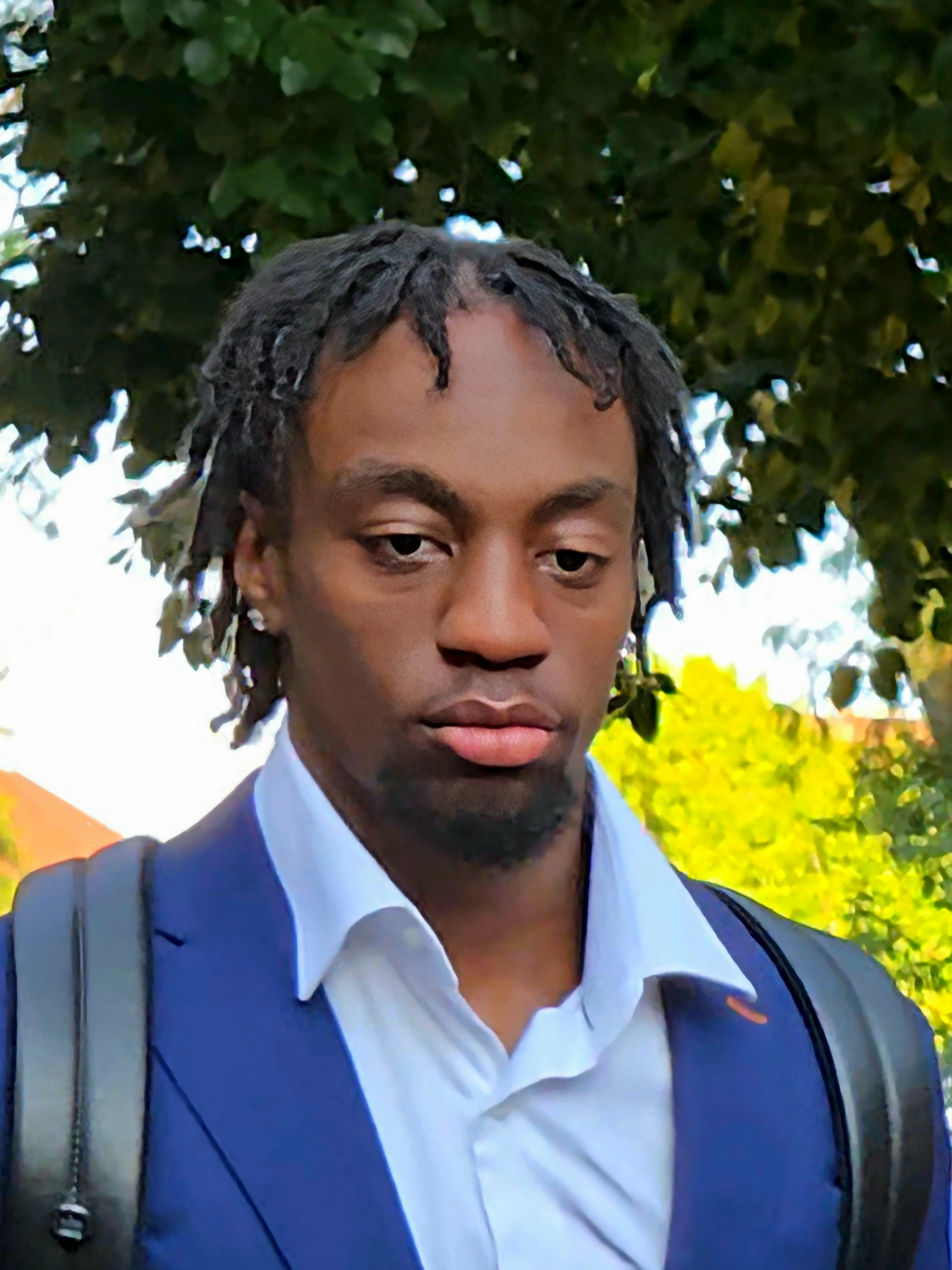

No. 15 – Ole Miss Rebels
- Position: Wide receiver
- Class: Senior

Personal information
- Born: December 12, 2004 (age 21)
- Listed height: 6 ft 1 in (1.85 m)
- Listed weight: 185 lb (84 kg)

Career information
- High school: Atascocita (Atascocita, Texas)
- College: Syracuse (2023–2025); Ole Miss (2026–present)
- Stats at ESPN

Darrell Lorenzo Gill Jr. (born December 12, 2004) is an American football wide receiver for the Ole Miss Rebels. He previously played for the Syracuse Orange.

== Early life ==
Gill Jr. attended Atascocita High School in Atascocita, Texas. Coming out of high school, he initially planned to enroll at Texas State on scholarship as a sprinter, high jumper and triple jumper. However, Gill Jr. ultimately committed to play college football for the Syracuse Orange.

== College career ==
=== Syracuse ===
As a freshman in 2023, Gill Jr. totaled seven receptions. In week 13 of the 2024 season, he brought in nine passes for 185 yards and a touchdown in a victory against UConn. In the 2024 Holiday Bowl, Gill Jr. tallied four receptions for 145 yards in a win over Washington State. During the 2024 season, he recorded 31 receptions for 570 yards and two touchdowns. In week 3 of the 2025 season, Gill Jr. hauled in six passes for 152 yards and two touchdowns in a win over Colgate, earning ACC Receiver of the Week honors. He finished the 2025 season with 32 catches for 506 yards and five touchdowns. After the conclusion of the season, Gill Jr. entered the NCAA transfer portal, despite previously announcing he would return to the Orange for the 2026 season.
