= 2023 Atlantic Coast Conference football season =

2023 ACC Football season
- League: NCAA Division I Football Bowl Subdivision
- Sport: Football
- Teams: 14

2024 NFL draft
- Top draft pick: Drake Maye, North Carolina
- Picked by: New England Patriots, 3rd overall

Regular season
- Season champions: Florida State
- Runners-up: Louisville

ACC Championship Game
- Venue: Bank of America Stadium, Charlotte, North Carolina
- Champions: Florida State
- Runners-up: Louisville
- Finals MVP: Lawrance Toafili, RB, Florida State

Seasons
- ← 2022 2024 →

2023 Atlantic Coast Conference football standings
	Conf.			Overall
Team	W		L	W		L
No. 6 Florida State y$	8	–	0	13	–	1
No. 19 Louisville y	7	–	1	10	–	4
No. 21 NC State	6	–	2	9	–	4
Georgia Tech	5	–	3	7	–	6
Virginia Tech	5	–	3	7	–	6
No. 20 Clemson	4	–	4	9	–	4
Duke	4	–	4	8	–	5
North Carolina	4	–	4	8	–	5
Boston College	3	–	5	7	–	6
Miami (FL)	3	–	5	7	–	6
Syracuse	2	–	6	6	–	7
Pittsburgh	2	–	6	3	–	9
Virginia	2	–	6	3	–	9
Wake Forest	1	–	7	4	–	8
Championship: Florida State 16, Louisville 6
$ – Conference champion; y – Championship game participant; Rankings from AP Poll

The 2023 Atlantic Coast Conference football season, part of the 2023 NCAA Division I FBS football season, was the 71st season of college football play for the Atlantic Coast Conference (ACC). The ACC consisted of 14 members, with California, Stanford, and SMU having been announced to join the ACC on July 1, 2024. The 2023 season was the first season without divisions since 2005 (other than the pandemic-disrupted 2020 season). The entire schedule was released on January 30, 2023.

== Preseason ==
=== Recruiting classes ===
National rankings
Team	Rivals	24/7	On3 Recruits	Total signees
Boston College	62	60	63	18
Clemson	10	11	11	26
Duke	53	55	62	26
Florida State	26	19	20	18
Georgia Tech	63	63	64	19
Louisville	43	35	27	15
Miami	7	7	6	24
North Carolina	29	29	30	20
NC State	37	40	35	18
Pittsburgh	53	51	53	19
Syracuse	97	84	76	16
Virginia	59	64	67	21
Virginia Tech	39	37	41	27
Wake Forest	46	53	56	20

=== ACC Kickoff ===
The 2023 ACC Kickoff was held on July 25 through 27 at the Westin hotel in Charlotte, North Carolina. This year was the first year where the event expanded to three full interview days. Each team had their head coach and three players available to talk to the media. Coverage of the event was televised by the ACC Network. The preseason poll and preseason All-ACC Teams were released after the event, with the preseason poll being released on August 1, 2023.

Predicted finish	Team	Votes (1st place)
1	Clemson	2,370 (103)
2	Florida State	2,304 (67)
3	North Carolina	1,981 (5)
4	NC State	1,662 (1)
5	Miami	1,553
6	Duke	1,511
6	Pittsburgh	1,511
8	Louisville	1,344
9	Wake Forest	1,181
10	Syracuse	826
11	Virginia Tech	678
12	Georgia Tech	633
13	Boston College	561
14	Virginia	365

=== Preseason ACC Player of the year ===
Ranking	Player	Position	Team	Votes
1	Drake Maye	QB	North Carolina	88
2	Jordan Travis	QB	Florida State	66
3	Will Shipley	RB	Clemson	17
4	Jeremiah Trotter Jr.	LB	Clemson	3
5	Riley Leonard	QB	Duke	1
5	Tyler Davis	DT	Clemson	1

=== Preseason all-conference teams ===
==== Offense ====
Position	Player	School	Votes
Quarterback	Drake Maye	North Carolina	107
Running back	Will Shipley	Clemson	196
Running back	Trey Benson	Florida State	125
Wide receiver	Johnny Wilson	Florida State	117
Wide receiver	Devontez Walker	North Carolina	51
Wide receiver	Jalon Calhoun	Duke	49
Tight end	Oronde Gadsden II	Syracuse	89
All-Purpose	Will Shipley	Clemson	105
Tackle	Graham Barton	Duke	110
Tackle	Matt Goncalves	Pittsburgh	58
Guard	Christian Mahogany	Boston College	101
Guard	Javion Cohen	Miami	69
Center	Bryan Hudson	Louisville	56

==== Defense ====
Position	Player	School	Votes
Defensive end	Jared Verse	Florida State	136
Defensive end	Donovan Ezeiruaku	Boston College	58
Defensive tackle	Tyler Davis	Clemson	124
Defensive tackle	DeWayne Carter	Duke	97
Linebacker	Jeremiah Trotter Jr.	Clemson	132
Linebacker	Cedric Gray	North Carolina	109
Linebacker	Barrett Carter	Clemson	87
Cornerback	Fentrell Cypress II	Florida State	88
Cornerback	Aydan White	NC State	85
Safety	Kamren Kinchens	Miami	117
Safety	Andrew Mukuba	Clemson	46

==== Specialist ====
Position	Player	School	Votes
Placekicker	Andres Borregales	Miami	70
Punter	Daniel Sparks	Virginia	54
Specialist	Will Shipley	Clemson	68

=== Preseason awards ===
==== All−American Teams ====
	AP 1st Team	AP 2nd Team	AS 1st Team	AS 2nd Team	WCFF 1st Team	WCFF 2nd Team	ESPN	CBS 1st Team	CBS 2nd Team	CFN 1st Team	CFN 2nd Team	PFF 1st Team	PFF 2nd Team	PFF 3rd Team	SN 1st Team	SN 2nd Team
Graham Barton, OT, Duke				✓	✓				✓				✓			✓
Trey Benson, RB, Florida State														✓		
Barrett Carter, LB, Clemson		✓		✓		✓	✓		✓				✓			
DeWayne Carter, DT, Duke														✓		
Fentrell Cypress, CB, Florida State				✓										✓		
Tyler Davis, DT, Clemson		✓		✓					✓							
Oronde Gadsden, TE, Syracuse		✓														✓
Cedric Gray, LB, North Carolina		✓												✓		✓
Kamren Kinchens, S, Miami (FL)	✓		✓		✓		✓	✓		✓		✓			✓	
Christian Mahogany, OG, Boston College		✓								✓				✓		
Drake Maye, QB, North Carolina		✓		✓		✓			✓				✓			✓
R.J. Mickens, S, Clemson														✓		
Will Shipley, RB, Clemson		✓		✓											✓	
Leonard Taylor III, DT, Miami (FL)						✓				✓			✓			
Jordan Travis, QB, Florida State														✓		
Jeremiah Trotter Jr., LB, Clemson		✓	✓		✓			✓			✓	✓			✓	
Jared Verse, DE, Florida State	✓		✓		✓		✓	✓		✓		✓			✓	
James Williams, S, Miami (FL)											✓		✓			
Johnny Wilson, WR, Florida State														✓		✓

=== Preseason award watchlists ===
Award	Head Coach/Player	School	Position	Year	Ref
Lott Trophy	Barrett Carter	Clemson	LB	Jr.	
Lott Trophy	DeWayne Carter	Duke	DL	(redshirt) Sr.	
Lott Trophy	Jared Verse	Florida State	DE	Sr.	
Lott Trophy	Kamren Kinchens	Miami	S	Jr.	
Lott Trophy	Cedric Gray	North Carolina	LB	Sr.	
Lott Trophy	Chico Bennett	Virginia	DE	Sr.	
Dodd Trophy	Mack Brown	North Carolina	—	—	
Dodd Trophy	Dave Clawson	Wake Forest	—	—	
Dodd Trophy	Dave Doeren	NC State	—	—	
Dodd Trophy	Mike Norvell	Florida State	—	—	
Dodd Trophy	Dabo Swinney	Clemson	—	—	
Maxwell Award	Will Shipley	Clemson	RB	Jr.	
Maxwell Award	Riley Leonard	Duke	QB	Jr.	
Maxwell Award	Jordan Travis	Florida State	QB	Sr.	
Maxwell Award	Trey Benson	Florida State	RB	Jr.	
Maxwell Award	Jack Plummer	Louisville	QB	Sr.	
Maxwell Award	Drake Maye	North Carolina	QB	So.	
Maxwell Award	Phil Jurkovec	Pittsburgh	QB	Sr.	
Maxwell Award	Garrett Shrader	Syracuse	QB	Sr.	
Maxwell Award	Oronde Gadsden II	Syracuse	TE	Jr.	
Maxwell Award	Donavon Greene	Wake Forest	QB	Jr.	
Davey O'Brien Award	Cade Klubnik	Clemson	QB	So.	
Davey O'Brien Award	Riley Leonard	Duke	QB	Jr.	
Davey O'Brien Award	Jordan Travis	Florida State	QB	Sr.	
Davey O'Brien Award	Drake Maye	North Carolina	QB	So.	
Davey O'Brien Award	Garrett Shrader	Syracuse	QB	Sr.	
Doak Walker Award	Pat Garwo	Boston College	RB	Gs.	
Doak Walker Award	Will Shipley	Clemson	RB	Jr.	
Doak Walker Award	Trey Benson	Florida State	RB	Jr.	
Doak Walker Award	Dontae Smith	Georgia Tech	RB	Sr.	
Doak Walker Award	Jawhar Jordan	Louisville	RB	Jr.	
Doak Walker Award	Rodney Hammond Jr.	Pittsburgh	RB	Jr.	
Doak Walker Award	LeQuint Allen	Syracuse	RB	So.	
Doak Walker Award	Bhayshul Tuten	Virginia Tech	RB	Jr.	
Doak Walker Award	Justice Ellison	Wake Forest	RB		
Biletnikoff Award	Ryan O'Keefe	Boston College	WR	Sr.	
Biletnikoff Award	Jalon Calhoun	Duke	WR	(redshirt) Sr.	
Biletnikoff Award	Keon Coleman	Florida State	WR	Jr.	
Biletnikoff Award	Johnny Wilson	Florida State	WR	Jr.	
Biletnikoff Award	Jamari Thrash	Louisville	WR	Jr.	
Biletnikoff Award	Devontez Walker	North Carolina	WR	Jr.	
Biletnikoff Award	Bradley Rozner	NC State	WR	Gs.	
Biletnikoff Award	Oronde Gadsden II	Syracuse	TE	Jr.	
Biletnikoff Award	Ali Jennings III	Virginia Tech	WR	Sr.	
Biletnikoff Award	Jaylin Lane	Virginia Tech	WR	Sr.	
John Mackey Award	George Takacs	Boston College	TE	Gs.	
John Mackey Award	Jake Briningstool	Clemson	TE	So.	
John Mackey Award	Jaheim Bell	Florida State	TE	Jr.	
John Mackey Award	John Copenhaver	North Carolina	TE	Jr.	
John Mackey Award	Bryson Nesbit	North Carolina	TE	Jr.	
John Mackey Award	Trent Pennix	NC State	TE	Gs.	
John Mackey Award	Gavin Bartholomew	Pittsburgh	TE	Jr.	
John Mackey Award	Nick Gallo	Virginia Tech	TE	Sr.	
Rimington Trophy	Will Putnam	Clemson	C	Gs.	
Rimington Trophy	Jacob Monk	Duke	C	Gs.	
Rimington Trophy	Maurice Smith	Florida State	C	(redshirt) Jr.	
Rimington Trophy	Bryan Hudson	Louisville	C	(redshirt) Sr.	
Rimington Trophy	Matthew Lee	Miami	C	(redshirt) Sr.	
Rimington Trophy	Dylan McMahon	NC State	C	(redshirt) Jr.	
Rimington Trophy	Jake Kradel	Pittsburgh	C	(redshirt) Sr.	
Butkus Award	Barrett Carter	Clemson	LB	So.	
Butkus Award	Jeremiah Trotter Jr.	Clemson	LB	Jr.	
Butkus Award	Tatum Bethune	Florida State	LB	(redshirt) Sr.	
Butkus Award	Cedric Gray	North Carolina	LB	Sr.	
Butkus Award	Payton Wilson	NC State	LB	(redshirt) Jr.	
Butkus Award	Marlowe Wax	Syracuse	LB	So.	

Award	Head Coach/Player	School	Position	Year	Ref
Jim Thorpe Award	Andrew Mukuba	Clemson	S	Jr.	
Jim Thorpe Award	Fentrell Cypress	Florida State	CB	Jr.	
Jim Thorpe Award	Kamren Kinchens	Miami	S	Jr.	
Jim Thorpe Award	Aydan White	NC State	CB	Jr.	
Bronko Nagurski Trophy	Barrett Carter	Clemson	LB	Jr.	
Bronko Nagurski Trophy	DeWayne Carter	Duke	DT	(redshirt) Jr.	
Bronko Nagurski Trophy	Fentrell Cypress II	Florida State	CB	(redshirt) Sr.	
Bronko Nagurski Trophy	Tyler Davis	Clemson	DT	Sr.	
Bronko Nagurski Trophy	Donovan Ezeiruaku	Boston College	DE	Jr.	
Bronko Nagurski Trophy	Cedric Gray	North Carolina	LB	Sr.	
Bronko Nagurski Trophy	Kam Kinchens	Miami	S	Jr.	
Bronko Nagurski Trophy	Jeremiah Trotter Jr.	Clemson	LB	Jr.	
Bronko Nagurski Trophy	Jared Verse	Florida State	DE	Jr.	
Bronko Nagurski Trophy	Aydan White	N.C. State	CB	So.	
Outland Trophy	Jeremiah Byers	Florida State	OT	(redshirt) Jr.	
Outland Trophy	Javion Cohen	Miami	G	(redshirt) Jr.	
Outland Trophy	Tyler Davis	Clemson	DT	Sr.	
Outland Trophy	Matt Goncalves	Pitt	OT	(redshirt) Sr.	
Outland Trophy	Bryan Hudson	Louisville	C	Sr.	
Outland Trophy	Christian Mahogany	Boston College	G	(redshirt) Jr.	
Outland Trophy	Ruke Orhorhoro	Clemson	DT	GS	
Lou Groza Award	Andrés Borregales	Miami	PK	Jr.	
Lou Groza Award	Ryan Coe	North Carolina	PK	Sr.	
Lou Groza Award	Brayden Narveson	N.C. State	PK	Sr.	
Lou Groza Award	Ben Sauls	Pitt	PK	Jr.	
Ray Guy Award	Alex Mastromanno	Florida State	P	Jr.	
Ray Guy Award	Ben Kiernan	North Carolina	P	GS	
Ray Guy Award	Daniel Sparks	Virginia	P	Sr.	
Ray Guy Award	Ivan Mora	Wake Forest	P	(redshirt) Jr.	
Ray Guy Award	Max Von Marburg	Syracuse	P	So.	
Ray Guy Award	Peter Moore	Virginia Tech	P	(redshirt) Jr.	
Ray Guy Award	Porter Wilson	Duke	P	GS	
Paul Hornung Award	Ryan O'Keefe	Boston College	WR	Sr.	
Paul Hornung Award	Will Shipley	Clemson	RB	Jr.	
Paul Hornung Award	Jaylen Stinson	Duke	S	Sr.	
Paul Hornung Award	Jawhar Jordan	Louisville	RB	(redshirt) Jr.	
Paul Hornung Award	M.J. Devonshire	Pittsburgh	CB	(redshirt) Sr.	
Paul Hornung Award	Trebor Pena	Syracuse	WR	So.	
Paul Hornung Award	Jaylin Lane	Virginia Tech	WR	Sr.	
Wuerffel Trophy	Will Shipley	Clemson	RB	Jr.	
Wuerffel Trophy	Ja'Mion Franklin	Duke	DT	(redshirt) Sr.	
Wuerffel Trophy	Jared Verse	Florida State	DE	Sr.	
Wuerffel Trophy	LaMiles Brooks	Georgia Tech	DB	Jr.	
Wuerffel Trophy	Ashton Gillotte	Louisville	DE	Jr.	
Wuerffel Trophy	Kamren Kinchens	Miami	S	Jr.	
Wuerffel Trophy	Joseph Shimko	NC State	LS	Sr.	
Wuerffel Trophy	Elijah Green	North Carolina	RB	Jr.	
Wuerffel Trophy	Kaimon Rucker	North Carolina	LB	Sr.	
Wuerffel Trophy	David Green	Pittsburgh	DT	Sr.	
Wuerffel Trophy	Gavin Bartholomew	Pittsburgh	TE	Jr.	
Wuerffel Trophy	Garrett Shrader	Syracuse	QB	Sr.	
Wuerffel Trophy	Chico Bennett Jr.	Virginia	DE	Gs.	
Wuerffel Trophy	Matt Johnson	Virginia Tech	LB	Sr.	
Wuerffel Trophy	Jaylen Hudson	Wake Forest	LB	Jr.	
Walter Camp Award	Jeremiah Trotter Jr.	Clemson	LB	Jr.	
Walter Camp Award	Jordan Travis	Florida State	QB	Sr.	
Walter Camp Award	Jared Verse	Florida State	DE	Sr.	
Walter Camp Award	Drake Maye	North Carolina	QB	So.	

Award	Head Coach/Player	School	Position	Year	Ref
Bednarik Award	Donovan Ezeiruaku	Boston College	DE	Jr.	
Bednarik Award	Barrett Carter	Clemson	LB	Jr.	
Bednarik Award	Tyler Davis	Clemson	DT	Sr.	
Bednarik Award	Jeremiah Trotter Jr.	Clemson	LB	Jr.	
Bednarik Award	DeWayne Carter	Duke	DT	(redshirt) Sr.	
Bednarik Award	Jared Verse	Florida State	DE	(redshirt) Jr.	
Bednarik Award	LaMiles Brooks	Georgia Tech	DB	Jr.	
Bednarik Award	Kamren Kinchens	Miami	S	Jr.	
Bednarik Award	Leonard Taylor III	Miami	DL	So.	
Bednarik Award	Cedric Gray	North Carolina	LB	Sr.	
Bednarik Award	Aydan White	NC State	CB	Jr.	
Bednarik Award	Payton Wilson	NC State	LB	(redshirt) Jr.	
Bednarik Award	M.J. Devonshire	Pittsburgh	DB	(redshirt) Sr.	
Bednarik Award	Marlowe Wax	Syracuse	LB	So.	
Bednarik Award	Chico Bennett Jr.	Virginia	DE	Gs.	
Rotary Lombardi Award	Christian Mahogany	Boston College	OG	Gs.	
Rotary Lombardi Award	Barrett Carter	Clemson	LB	Jr.	
Rotary Lombardi Award	Tyler Davis	Clemson	DT	Gs.	
Rotary Lombardi Award	Jeremiah Trotter Jr.	Clemson	LB	Jr.	
Rotary Lombardi Award	Graham Barton	Duke	OT	Sr.	
Rotary Lombardi Award	DeWayne Carter	Duke	DT	(redshirt) Sr.	
Rotary Lombardi Award	D'Mitri Emmanuel	Florida State	OG	(redshirt) Sr.	
Rotary Lombardi Award	Jared Verse	Florida State	DE	(redshirt) Jr.	
Rotary Lombardi Award	Cedric Gray	North Carolina	LB	Sr.	
Rotary Lombardi Award	Marlowe Wax	Syracuse	LB	Jr.	
Rotary Lombardi Award	Michael Jurgens	Wake Forest	OG	(redshirt) Sr.	
Patrick Mannelly Award	James Rosenberry	Florida State	(redshirt) Jr.	LS	
Patrick Mannelly Award	Drew Little	North Carolina	Gs.	LS	
Patrick Mannelly Award	Joe Shimko	NC State	Gs.	LS	
Earl Campbell Tyler Rose Award	Ryan O'Keefe	Boston College	WR	Gs.	
Earl Campbell Tyler Rose Award	Cade Klubnik	Clemson	QB	So.	
Earl Campbell Tyler Rose Award	Bradley Rozner	NC State	WR	Gs.	
Polynesian College Football Player Of The Year Award	Lawrance Toafili	Florida State	RB	(redshirt) Jr.	
Polynesian College Football Player Of The Year Award	Jermayne Lole	Louisville	DL	Gs.	
Polynesian College Football Player Of The Year Award	Francis Mauigoa	Miami (FL)	OL	Fr.	
Polynesian College Football Player Of The Year Award	Francisco Mauigoa	Miami (FL)	LB	Jr.	
Polynesian College Football Player Of The Year Award	Josh Ilaoa	Syracuse	OL	Jr.	
Polynesian College Football Player Of The Year Award	Aaron Faumui	Virginia	DL	Gs.	
Manning Award	Riley Leonard	Duke	QB	Jr.	
Manning Award	Jordan Travis	Florida State	QB	Sr.	
Manning Award	Drake Maye	North Carolina	QB	So.	
Manning Award	Garrett Shrader	Syracuse	QB	Jr.	
Johnny Unitas Golden Arm Award	Riley Leonard	Duke	QB	Jr.	
Johnny Unitas Golden Arm Award	Jordan Travis	Florida State	QB	Sr.	
Johnny Unitas Golden Arm Award	Tyler Van Dyke	Miami	QB	(redshirt) So.	
Johnny Unitas Golden Arm Award	Drake Maye	North Carolina	QB	So.	
Johnny Unitas Golden Arm Award	Brennan Armstrong	NC State	QB	Gs.	
Johnny Unitas Golden Arm Award	Phil Jurkovec	Pittsburgh	QB	Sr.	
Johnny Unitas Golden Arm Award	Garrett Shrader	Syracuse	QB	Sr.	
Johnny Unitas Golden Arm Award	Grant Wells	Virginia Tech	QB	(redshirt) Sr.	
Johnny Unitas Golden Arm Award	Mitch Griffis	Wake Forest	QB	(redshirt) Fr.	

== Coaches ==
=== Coaching changes ===
The ACC entered the 2023 season with two new head football coaches:

- On September 25, 2022, Georgia Tech fired head coach Geoff Collins and was replaced by interim head coach Brent Key. On November 29, 2022, Key was hired as the next head coach.
- On December 5, 2022, Cincinnati hired Louisville head coach Scott Satterfield and was replaced by former Purdue head coach Jeff Brohm on December 7, 2022.

=== Head coaching records ===
Team	Head coach	Years at school	Overall record	Record at school	ACC record
Boston College	Jeff Hafley	4	15–20	15–20	9–17
Clemson	Dabo Swinney	15	161–39	161–39	99–19
Duke	Mike Elko	2	9–4	9–4	5–3
Florida State	Mike Norvell	4	56–31	18–16	11–13
Georgia Tech	Brent Key	2	4–4	4–4	4–3
Louisville	Jeff Brohm	1	66–44	0–0	0–0
Miami	Mario Cristobal	2	67–67	5–7	3–5
North Carolina	Mack Brown	15	274–144–1	99–68–1	61–49–1
NC State	Dave Doeren	11	95–58	72–54	38–44
Pittsburgh	Pat Narduzzi	9	62–41	62–41	41–25
Syracuse	Dino Babers	8	73–65	36–49	18–39
Virginia	Tony Elliot	2	3–7	3–7	1–6
Virginia Tech	Brent Pry	2	3–8	3–8	1–6
Wake Forest	Dave Clawson	10	149–132	59–53	29–42

== Rankings ==
Legend
	Improvement in ranking
	Drop in ranking
	Not ranked previous week
RV	Received votes but were not ranked in Top 25 of poll
т	Tied with team above or below also with this symbol

		Pre	Wk 1	Wk 2	Wk 3	Wk 4	Wk 5	Wk 6	Wk 7	Wk 8	Wk 9	Wk 10	Wk 11	Wk 12	Wk 13	Wk 14	Final
Boston College	AP																
Boston College	C																
Boston College	CFP	Not released															
Clemson	AP	9	25	RV	RV	RV	RV	RV	RV			RV		RV	RV	RV	20
Clemson	C	9	21	22	23	RV	RV	RV	RV	RV				RV	RV	RV	20
Clemson	CFP	Not released												24	23		
Duke	AP	RV	21	21	18	17	19	17	16	20		RV					RV
Duke	C	RV	24	20	18	16	21	18	17	21	RV	RV					RV
Duke	CFP	Not released															
Florida State	AP	8	4 (3)	3 (3)	4 (1)	5 (3)	5 (4)	4 (1)	4 (1)	4 (3)	4 (3)	4 (2)	4	5	4	4	6т
Florida State	C	8	5	3	3	4	5	4	4	4	4	4	4	4	4	3	6
Florida State	CFP	Not released									4	4	4	5	4	5	
Georgia Tech	AP																
Georgia Tech	C																
Georgia Tech	CFP	Not released															
Louisville	AP	RV	RV		RV	RV	25	14	21	18	15	11	9	9	15	16	19
Louisville	C		RV	RV	RV	RV	25	15	21	18	15	11	9	9	14	15	18
Louisville	CFP	Not released									13	11	10	10	14		
Miami	AP	RV	RV	22	20	18	17	25	RV	RV	RV						
Miami	C	RV	RV	23	21	18	17	RV	RV	RV	RV						
Miami	CFP	Not released															
North Carolina	AP	21	17	20	17	15	14	12	10	17	RV	24	22	RV	RV		
North Carolina	C	20	16	18	17	15	13	12	10	17	25	23	20	RV			RV
North Carolina	CFP	Not released										24	20				
NC State	AP	RV	RV									RV	RV	RV	21т	19	21
NC State	C	RV	RV									RV	RV	24	20	18	21
NC State	CFP	Not released												22	19		
Pittsburgh	AP	RV	RV														
Pittsburgh	C	RV	RV														
Pittsburgh	CFP	Not released															
Syracuse	AP				RV	RV											
Syracuse	C			RV	RV	RV											
Syracuse	CFP	Not released															
Virginia	AP																
Virginia	C																
Virginia	CFP	Not released															
Virginia Tech	AP																
Virginia Tech	C																
Virginia Tech	CFP	Not released															
Wake Forest	AP																
Wake Forest	C	RV	RV	RV	RV												
Wake Forest	CFP	Not released															

== Schedule ==
The regular season began on August 31, 2023, and ended on November 25, 2023. The ACC Championship Game will be played on Saturday December 2, 2023, at Bank of America Stadium in Charlotte, North Carolina.

=== Regular season ===
==== Week one ====
Date	Time	Visiting team	Home team	Site	TV	Result	Attendance	Ref.
August 31	7:00 p.m.	Elon	Wake Forest	Allegacy Federal Credit Union Stadium • Winston-Salem, NC	ACCN	W 37–17	30,028	
August 31	7:30 p.m.	NC State	UConn	Pratt & Whitney Stadium at Rentschler Field • East Hartford, CT	CBSSN	W 24–14	36,536	
September 1	7:00 p.m.	Miami (OH)	Miami	Hard Rock Stadium • Miami Gardens, FL	ACCN	W 38–3	49,024	
September 1	7:30 p.m.	Louisville	Georgia Tech	Mercedes-Benz Stadium • Atlanta, GA (Chick-fil-A Kickoff)	ESPN	LOU 39–34	36,101	
September 2	Noon	Northern Illinois	Boston College	Alumni Stadium • Chestnut Hill, MA	ACCN	L 24–27 ^{OT}	30,122	
September 2	Noon	Virginia	No. 12 Tennessee	Nissan Stadium • Nashville, TN	ABC	L 13–49	69,507	
September 2	3:30 p.m.	Wofford	Pittsburgh	Acrisure Stadium • Pittsburgh, PA	ACCN	W 45–7	45,096	
September 2	4:00 p.m.	Colgate	Syracuse	JMA Wireless Dome • Syracuse, NY (rivalry)	ACCNX/ESPN+	W 65–0	32,465	
September 2	7:30 p.m.	No. 21 North Carolina	South Carolina	Bank of America Stadium • Charlotte, NC (Duke's Mayo Classic, rivalry, College GameDay)	ABC	W 31–17	68,723	
September 2	8:00 p.m.	Old Dominion	Virginia Tech	Lane Stadium • Blacksburg, VA	ACCN	W 36–17	65,632	
September 3	7:30 p.m.	No. 5 LSU	No. 8 Florida State	Camping World Stadium • Orlando, FL (Camping World Kickoff)	ABC	W 45–24	65,429	
September 4	8:00 p.m.	No. 9 Clemson	Duke	Wallace Wade Stadium • Durham, NC	ESPN	DUKE 28–7	31,638	
^{#}Rankings from AP Poll released prior to game. All times are in Eastern Time.

==== Week two ====
Date	Time	Visiting team	Home team	Site	TV	Result	Attendance	Ref.
September 7	7:00 p.m.	Murray State	Louisville	L&N Federal Credit Union Stadium • Louisville, KY	ACCN	W 56–0	45,273	
September 9	11:00 a.m.	Vanderbilt	Wake Forest	Allegacy Federal Credit Union Stadium • Winston-Salem, NC	ACCN	W 36–20	28,363	
September 9	Noon	No. 5 (FCS) Holy Cross	Boston College	Alumni Stadium • Chestnut Hill, MA (rivalry)	ACCNX/ESPN+	W 31–28	40,122	
September 9	Noon	No. 10 Notre Dame	NC State	Carter–Finley Stadium • Raleigh, NC	ABC	L 24–45	56,919	
September 9	Noon	James Madison	Virginia	Scott Stadium • Charlottesville, VA	ESPNU	L 35–36	56,508	
September 9	Noon	Purdue	Virginia Tech	Lane Stadium • Blacksburg, VA	ESPN2	L 17–24	65,632	
September 9	1:00 p.m.	South Carolina State	Georgia Tech	Bobby Dodd Stadium • Atlanta, GA	ACCNX/ESPN+	W 48–13	31,452	
September 9	2:15 p.m.	Charleston Southern	No. 25 Clemson	Memorial Stadium • Clemson, SC	ACCN	W 66–17	81,500	
September 9	3:30 p.m.	No. 23 Texas A&M	Miami	Hard Rock Stadium • Miami Gardens, FL	ABC	W 48–33	48,792	
September 9	3:30 p.m.	Western Michigan	Syracuse	JMA Wireless Dome • Syracuse, NY	ACCNX/ESPN+	W 48–7	32,637	
September 9	5:15 p.m.	Appalachian State	No. 17 North Carolina	Kenan Stadium • Chapel Hill, NC	ACCN	W 40–34 ^{2OT}	50,500	
September 9	6:00 p.m.	Lafayette	No. 21 Duke	Wallace Wade Stadium • Durham, NC	ACCNX/ESPN+	W 42–7	17,481	
September 9	6:30 p.m.	Cincinnati	Pittsburgh	Acrisure Stadium • Pittsburgh, PA (River City Rivalry)	CW	L 21–27	49,398	
September 9	8:30 p.m.	Southern Miss	No. 4 Florida State	Doak Campbell Stadium • Tallahassee, FL	ACCN	W 66–13	74,467	
^{#}Rankings from AP Poll released prior to game. All times are in Eastern Time.

==== Week three ====
Date	Time	Visiting team	Home team	Site	TV	Result	Attendance	Ref.
September 14	7:30 p.m.	Bethune–Cookman	No. 22 Miami	Hard Rock Stadium • Miami Gardens, FL	ACCN	W 48–7	40,077	
September 15	7:00 p.m.	Virginia	Maryland	SECU Stadium • College Park, MD (rivalry)	FS1	L 14–42	37,041	
September 16	Noon	No. 3 Florida State	Boston College	Alumni Stadium • Chestnut Hill, MA	ABC	FSU 31–29	41,383	
September 16	Noon	Louisville	Indiana	Lucas Oil Stadium • Indianapolis, IN	BTN	W 21–14	37,250	
September 16	Noon	Wake Forest	Old Dominion	S.B. Ballard Stadium • Norfolk, VA	ESPN2	W 27–24	18,276	
September 16	2:00 p.m.	VMI	NC State	Carter–Finley Stadium • Raleigh, NC	CW	W 45–7	56,919	
September 16	3:30 p.m.	Northwestern	No. 21 Duke	Wallace Wade Stadium • Durham, NC	ACCN	W 38–14	18,141	
September 16	3:30 p.m.	Minnesota	No. 20 North Carolina	Kenan Stadium • Chapel Hill, NC	ESPN	W 31–13	45,151	
September 16	3:30 p.m.	Virginia Tech	Rutgers	SHI Stadium • Piscataway, NJ	BTN	L 16–35	52,657	
September 16	7:30 p.m.	Georgia Tech	No. 17 Ole Miss	Vaught–Hemingway Stadium • Oxford, MS	SECN	L 23–48	64,150	
September 16	7:30 p.m.	Pittsburgh	West Virginia	Milan Puskar Stadium • Morgantown, WV (Backyard Brawl)	ABC	L 6–17	61,106	
September 16	7:30 p.m.	Syracuse	Purdue	Ross–Ade Stadium • West Lafayette, IN	NBC	W 35–20	61,441	
September 16	8:00 p.m.	Florida Atlantic	Clemson	Memorial Stadium • Clemson, SC	ACCN	W 48–14	81,295	
^{#}Rankings from AP Poll released prior to game. All times are in Eastern Time.

==== Week four ====
Date	Time	Visiting team	Home team	Site	TV	Result	Attendance	Ref.
September 22	7:30 p.m.	NC State	Virginia	Scott Stadium • Charlottesville, VA	ESPN	NCSU 24–21	42,979	
September 23	Noon	No. 4 Florida State	Clemson	Memorial Stadium • Clemson, SC (rivalry)	ABC	FSU 31–24 ^{OT}	81,500	
September 23	Noon	Army	Syracuse	JMA Wireless Dome • Syracuse, NY	ACCN	W 29–16	37,594	
September 23	Noon	Virginia Tech	Marshall	Joan C. Edwards Stadium • Huntington, WV	ESPN2	L 17–24	31,475	
September 23	3:30 p.m.	Boston College	Louisville	L&N Federal Credit Union Stadium • Louisville, KY	ACCN	LOU 56–28	48,294	
September 23	3:30 p.m.	No. 20 Miami	Temple	Lincoln Financial Field • Philadelphia, PA	ESPN2	W 41–7	17,234	
September 23	3:30 p.m.	No. 18 Duke	UConn	Pratt & Whitney Stadium at Rentschler Field • East Hartford, CT	CBSSN	W 41–7	29,033	
September 23	6:30 p.m.	Georgia Tech	Wake Forest	Allegacy Federal Credit Union Stadium • Winston-Salem, NC	CW	GT 30–16	32,528	
September 23	8:00 p.m.	No. 17 North Carolina	Pittsburgh	Acrisure Stadium • Pittsburgh, PA	ACCN	UNC 41–24	48,544	
^{#}Rankings from AP Poll released prior to game. All times are in Eastern Time.

==== Week five ====
Date	Time	Visiting team	Home team	Site	TV	Result	Attendance	Ref.
September 29	7:00 p.m.	Louisville	NC State	Carter–Finley Stadium • Raleigh, NC	ESPN	LOU 13–10	56,919	
September 30	Noon	Clemson	Syracuse	JMA Wireless Dome • Syracuse, NY	ABC	CLEM 31–14	40,973	
September 30	2:00 p.m.	Virginia	Boston College	Alumni Stadium • Chestnut Hill, MA	CW	BC 27–24	41,868	
September 30	3:30 p.m.	Bowling Green	Georgia Tech	Bobby Dodd Stadium • Atlanta, GA	ACCN	L 27–38	30,097	
September 30	7:30 p.m.	No. 11 Notre Dame	No. 17 Duke	Wallace Wade Stadium • Durham, NC (College GameDay)	ABC	L 14–21	40,768	
September 30	8:30 p.m.	Pittsburgh	Virginia Tech	Lane Stadium • Blacksburg, VA	ACCN	VT 38–21	65,632	
^{#}Rankings from AP Poll released prior to game. All times are in Eastern Time.

Date	Bye Week			
September 30	No. 5 Florida State	No. 18 Miami	No. 15 North Carolina	Wake Forest

==== Week six ====
Date	Time	Visiting team	Home team	Site	TV	Result	Attendance	Ref.
October 7	Noon	Boston College	Army	Michie Stadium • West Point, NY	CBSSN	W 27–24	34,017	
October 7	Noon	No. 10 (FCS) William & Mary	Virginia	Scott Stadium • Charlottesville, VA	ACCN	W 27–13	38,289	
October 7	2:00 p.m.	Marshall	NC State	Carter–Finley Stadium • Raleigh, NC	CW	W 48–41	56,919	
October 7	3:30 p.m.	Wake Forest	Clemson	Memorial Stadium • Clemson, SC	ACCN	CLEM 17–12	80,810	
October 7	3:30 p.m.	Virginia Tech	No. 5 Florida State	Doak Campbell Stadium • Tallahassee, FL	ABC	FSU 39–17	79,560	
October 7	3:30 p.m.	Syracuse	No. 14 North Carolina	Kenan Stadium • Chapel Hill, NC	ESPN	UNC 40–7	50,500	
October 7	7:30 p.m.	No. 10 Notre Dame	No. 25 Louisville	L&N Federal Credit Union Stadium • Louisville, KY	ABC	W 33–20	59,081	
October 7	8:00 p.m.	Georgia Tech	No. 17 Miami	Hard Rock Stadium • Miami Gardens, FL	ACCN	GT 23–20	58,045	
^{#}Rankings from AP Poll released prior to game. All times are in Eastern Time.

Date	Bye Week	
October 7	No. 19 Duke	Pittsburgh

==== Week seven ====
Date	Time	Visiting team	Home team	Site	TV	Result	Attendance	Ref.
October 14	Noon	Syracuse	No. 4 Florida State	Doak Campbell Stadium • Tallahassee, FL	ABC	FSU 41–3	79,560	
October 14	3:30 p.m.	Wake Forest	Virginia Tech	Lane Stadium • Blacksburg, VA	ACCN	VT 30–13	65,632	
October 14	6:30 p.m.	No. 14 Louisville	Pittsburgh	Acrisure Stadium • Pittsburgh, PA	CW	PITT 38–21	46,296	
October 14	7:30 p.m.	No. 25 Miami	No. 12 North Carolina	Kenan Stadium • Chapel Hill, NC	ABC	UNC 41–31	50,500	
October 14	8:00 p.m.	NC State	No. 17 Duke	Wallace Wade Stadium • Durham, NC (Tobacco Road)	ACCN	DUKE 24–3	31,833	
^{#}Rankings from AP Poll released prior to game. All times are in Eastern Time.

Date	Bye Week			
October 14	Boston College	Clemson	Georgia Tech	Virginia

==== Week eight ====
Date	Time	Visiting team	Home team	Site	TV	Result	Attendance	Ref.
October 21	Noon	Boston College	Georgia Tech	Bobby Dodd Stadium • Atlanta, GA	ACCN	BC 38–23	35,656	
October 21	3:30 p.m.	Pittsburgh	Wake Forest	Allegacy Federal Credit Union Stadium • Winston-Salem, NC	ACCN	WAKE 21–17	31,855	
October 21	6:30 p.m.	Virginia	No. 10 North Carolina	Kenan Stadium • Chapel Hill, NC (South's Oldest Rivalry)	CW	UVA 31–27	50,500	
October 21	7:30 p.m.	No. 16 Duke	No. 4 Florida State	Doak Campbell Stadium • Tallahassee, FL	ABC	FSU 38–20	79,560	
October 21	8:00 p.m.	Clemson	Miami	Hard Rock Stadium • Miami Gardens, FL	ACCN	MIA 28–20 ^{2OT}	48,562	
^{#}Rankings from AP Poll released prior to game. All times are in Eastern Time.

Date	Bye Week			
October 21	No. 21 Louisville	NC State	Syracuse	Virginia Tech

==== Week nine ====
Date	Time	Visiting team	Home team	Site	TV	Result	Attendance	Ref.
October 26	7:30 p.m.	Syracuse	Virginia Tech	Lane Stadium • Blacksburg, VA	ESPN	VT 38–10	60,236	
October 28	Noon	No. 4 Florida State	Wake Forest	Allegacy Federal Credit Union Stadium • Winston-Salem, NC	ABC	FSU 41–16	31,288	
October 28	Noon	UConn	Boston College	Alumni Stadium • Chestnut Hill, MA	ACCN	W 21–14	36,902	
October 28	2:00 p.m.	Clemson	NC State	Carter–Finley Stadium • Raleigh, NC (Textile Bowl)	CW	NCSU 24–17	56,919	
October 28	3:30 p.m.	Pittsburgh	No. 14 Notre Dame	Notre Dame Stadium • South Bend, IN (rivalry)	NBC	L 7–58	77,622	
October 28	3:30 p.m.	No. 20 Duke	No. 18 Louisville	L&N Federal Credit Union Stadium • Louisville, KY	ESPN	LOU 23–0	52,319	
October 28	3:30 p.m.	Virginia	Miami	Hard Rock Stadium • Miami Gardens, FL	ACCN	MIA 29–26 ^{OT}	58,503	
October 28	8:00 p.m.	No. 17 North Carolina	Georgia Tech	Bobby Dodd Stadium • Atlanta, GA	ACCN	GT 46–42	35,945	
^{#}Rankings from AP Poll released prior to game. All times are in Eastern Time.

==== Week ten ====
Date	Time	Visiting team	Home team	Site	TV	Result	Attendance	Ref.
November 2	7:30 p.m.	Wake Forest	Duke	Wallace Wade Stadium • Durham, NC (Tobacco Road)	ESPN	DUKE 24–21	18,277	
November 3	7:30 p.m.	Boston College	Syracuse	JMA Wireless Dome • Syracuse, NY (rivalry)	ESPN2	BC 17–10	42,523	
November 4	Noon	Campbell	North Carolina	Kenan Stadium • Chapel Hill, NC	ACCN	W 59–7	47,667	
November 4	Noon	No. 15 Notre Dame	Clemson	Memorial Stadium • Clemson, SC	ABC	W 31–23	81,500	
November 4	2:00 p.m.	Georgia Tech	Virginia	Scott Stadium • Charlottesville, VA	CW	GT 45–17	42,606	
November 4	3:30 p.m.	Virginia Tech	No. 13 Louisville	L&N Federal Credit Union Stadium • Louisville, KY	ACCN	LOU 34–3	49,945	
November 4	3:30 p.m.	No. 4 Florida State	Pittsburgh	Acrisure Stadium • Pittsburgh, PA	ESPN	FSU 24–7	57,557	
November 4	8:00 p.m.	Miami	NC State	Carter–Finley Stadium • Raleigh, NC	ACCN	NCSU 20–6	56,919	
^{#}Rankings from College Football Playoff. All times are in Eastern Time.

==== Week eleven ====
Date	Time	Visiting team	Home team	Site	TV	Result	Attendance	Ref.
November 9	7:30 p.m.	Virginia	No. 11 Louisville	L&N Federal Credit Union Stadium • Louisville, KY	ESPN	LOU 31–24	44,628	
November 11	Noon	Georgia Tech	Clemson	Memorial Stadium • Clemson, SC (rivalry)	ABC	CLEM 42–21	81,426	
November 11	Noon	Virginia Tech	Boston College	Alumni Stadium • Chestnut Hill, MA (rivalry)	ACCN	VT 48–22	33,665	
November 11	2:00 p.m.	NC State	Wake Forest	Allegacy Federal Credit Union Stadium • Winston-Salem, NC (rivalry)	CW	NCSU 26–6	29,591	
November 11	3:30 p.m.	Miami	No. 4 Florida State	Doak Campbell Stadium • Tallahassee, FL (rivalry)	ABC	FSU 27–20	79,560	
November 11	3:30 p.m.	Pittsburgh	Syracuse	Yankee Stadium • Bronx, NY (rivalry)	ACCN	SYR 28–13	17,101	
November 11	8:00 p.m.	Duke	No. 24 North Carolina	Kenan Stadium • Chapel Hill, NC (Victory Bell)	ACCN	UNC 47–45 ^{2OT}	50,500	
^{#}Rankings from College Football Playoff. All times are in Eastern Time.

==== Week twelve ====
Date	Time	Visiting team	Home team	Site	TV	Result	Attendance	Ref.
November 16	7:00 p.m.	Boston College	Pittsburgh	Acrisure Stadium • Pittsburgh, PA	ESPN	PITT 24–16	41,842	
November 18	Noon	No. 10 Louisville	Miami	Hard Rock Stadium • Miami Gardens, FL	ABC	LOU 38–31	44,996	
November 18	3:00 p.m.	Duke	Virginia	Scott Stadium • Charlottesville, VA	CW	UVA 30–27	36,400	
November 18	3:30 p.m.	NC State	Virginia Tech	Lane Stadium • Blacksburg, VA	ACCN	NCSU 35–28	65,632	
November 18	3:30 p.m.	Wake Forest	No. 19 Notre Dame	Notre Dame Stadium • South Bend, IN	NBC	L 7–45	77,622	
November 18	3:30 p.m.	No. 20 North Carolina	Clemson	Memorial Stadium • Clemson, SC	ESPN	CLEM 31–20	81,305	
November 18	6:30 p.m.	North Alabama	No. 4 Florida State	Doak Campbell Stadium • Tallahassee, FL	CW	W 58–13	79,560	
November 18	8:00 p.m.	Syracuse	Georgia Tech	Bobby Dodd Stadium • Atlanta, GA	ACCN	GT 31–22	33,332	
^{#}Rankings from College Football Playoff. All times are in Eastern Time.

==== Week thirteen ====
Date	Time	Visiting team	Home team	Site	TV	Result	Attendance	Ref.
November 24	Noon	Miami	Boston College	Alumni Stadium • Chestnut Hill, MA	ABC	MIA 45–20	30,569	
November 25	Noon	Kentucky	No. 10 Louisville	L&N Federal Credit Union Stadium • Louisville, KY (Governor's Cup)	ABC	L 31–38	59,225	
November 25	Noon	Pittsburgh	Duke	Wallace Wade Stadium • Durham, NC	ACCN	DUKE 30–19	17,639	
November 25	2:00 p.m.	Wake Forest	Syracuse	JMA Wireless Dome • Syracuse, NY	CW	SYR 35–31	35,018	
November 25	3:30 p.m.	Virginia Tech	Virginia	Scott Stadium • Charlottesville, VA (Commonwealth Cup)	ACCN	VT 55–17	42,976	
November 25	7:00 p.m.	No. 5 Florida State	Florida	Ben Hill Griffin Stadium • Gainesville, FL (rivalry)	ESPN	W 24–15	90,341	
November 25	7:30 p.m.	No. 1 Georgia	Georgia Tech	Bobby Dodd Stadium • Atlanta, GA (Clean, Old-Fashioned Hate)	ABC	L 23–31	51,447	
November 25	7:30 p.m.	No. 24 Clemson	South Carolina	Williams–Brice Stadium • Columbia, SC (rivalry)	SECN	W 16–7	80,172	
November 25	8:00 p.m.	North Carolina	No. 22 NC State	Carter–Finley Stadium • Raleigh, NC (rivalry)	ACCN	NCSU 39–20	56,919	
^{#}Rankings from College Football Playoff. All times are in Eastern Time.

=== Championship Game ===
Date	Time	Visiting team	Home team	Site	TV	Result	Attendance	Ref.
December 2	8:00 p.m.	No. 14 Louisville	No. 4 Florida State	Bank of America Stadium • Charlotte, North Carolina	ABC	FSU 16–6	62,314	
^{#}Rankings from College Football Playoff. All times are in Eastern Time.

== Head-to-head matchups ==
2023 ACC head-to-head matchups
Team	Boston College	Clemson	Duke	Florida State	Georgia Tech	Louisville	Miami	NC State	North Carolina	Pittsburgh	Syracuse	Virginia	Virginia Tech	Wake Forest
vs. Boston College	—	×	×	31–29	23–38	56–28	45–20	×	×	24–16	10–17	24–27	48–22	×
vs. Clemson	×	—	28–7	31–24	21–42	×	28–20	24–17	20–31	×	14–31	×	×	12–17
vs. Duke	×	7–28	—	38–20	×	23–0	×	3–24	47–45	19–30	×	30–27	×	21–24
vs. Florida State	29–31	24–31	20–38	—	×	×	20–27	×	×	7–24	3–41	×	17–39	16–41
vs. Georgia Tech	38–23	42–21	×	×	—	39–34	20–23	×	42–46	×	22–31	17–45	×	16–30
vs. Louisville	28–56	×	0–23	×	34–39	—	31–38	10–13	×	38–21	×	24–31	3–34	×
vs. Miami	20–45	20–28	×	27–20	23–20	38–31	—	20–6	41–31	×	×	26–29	×	×
vs. NC State	×	17–24	24–3	×	×	13–10	6–20	—	20–39	×	×	21–24	28–35	6–26
vs. North Carolina	×	31–20	45–47	×	46–42	×	31–41	39–20	—	24–41	7–40	31–27	×	×
vs. Pittsburgh	16–24	×	30–19	24–7	×	21–38	×	×	41–24	—	28–13	×	38–21	21–17
vs. Syracuse	17–10	31–14	×	41–3	31–22	×	×	×	40–7	13–28	—	×	38–10	31–35
vs. Virginia	27–24	×	27–30	×	45–17	31–24	29–26	24–21	27–31	×	×	—	55–17	×
vs. Virginia Tech	22–48	×	×	39–17	×	34–3	×	35–28	×	21–38	10–38	17–55	—	13–30
vs. Wake Forest	×	17–12	24–21	41–16	30–16	×	×	26–6	×	17–21	35–31	×	30–13	—
Total	3–5	4–4	4–4	8–0	5–3	7–1	3–5	6–2	4–4	2–6	2–6	2–6	5–3	1–7

× – Matchup not played in 2023
Updated after the season.

== ACC vs other conferences ==
=== ACC vs Power Five matchups ===
The following games include ACC teams competing against "Power Five" conference teams from the Big Ten, Big 12, Pac-12, and SEC, as well as Notre Dame. All rankings are from the AP Poll at the time of the game.

Date	Conference	Visitor	Home	Site	Score
September 2	SEC	Virginia	No. 12 Tennessee	Nissan Stadium • Nashville, TN	L 13–49
September 2	SEC	No. 21 North Carolina	South Carolina	Bank of America Stadium • Charlotte, NC (Duke's Mayo Classic/rivalry)	W 31–17
September 3	SEC	No. 5 LSU	No. 8 Florida State	Camping World Stadium • Orlando, FL (Camping World Kickoff)	W 45–24
September 9	SEC	No. 23 Texas A&M	Miami	Hard Rock Stadium • Miami Gardens, FL	W 48–33
September 9	Independent	No. 10 Notre Dame	NC State	Carter–Finley Stadium • Raleigh, NC	L 24–45
September 9	Big 12	Cincinnati	Pittsburgh	Acrisure Stadium • Pittsburgh, PA (River City Rivalry)	L 21–27
September 9	Big Ten	Purdue	Virginia Tech	Lane Stadium • Blacksburg, VA	L 17–24
September 9	SEC	Vanderbilt	Wake Forest	Allegacy Federal Credit Union Stadium • Winston-Salem, NC	W 36–20
September 15	Big Ten	Virginia	Maryland	SECU Stadium • College Park, MD (rivalry)	L 14–42
September 16	Big Ten	Northwestern	No. 21 Duke	Wallace Wade Stadium • Durham, NC	W 38–14
September 16	SEC	Georgia Tech	No. 17 Ole Miss	Vaught–Hemingway Stadium • Oxford, MS	L 23–48
September 16	Big Ten	Louisville	Indiana	Lucas Oil Stadium • Indianapolis, IN	W 21–14
September 16	Big Ten	Minnesota	No. 20 North Carolina	Kenan Stadium • Chapel Hill, NC	W 31–13
September 16	Big 12	Pittsburgh	West Virginia	Milan Puskar Stadium • Morgantown, WV (Backyard Brawl)	L 6–17
September 16	Big Ten	Syracuse	Purdue	Ross–Ade Stadium • West Lafayette, IN	W 35–20
September 16	Big Ten	Virginia Tech	Rutgers	SHI Stadium • Piscataway, NJ	L 16–35
September 30	Independent	No. 11 Notre Dame	No. 17 Duke	Wallace Wade Stadium • Durham, NC	L 14–21
October 7	Independent	No. 10 Notre Dame	No. 25 Louisville	Cardinal Stadium • Louisville, KY	W 33–20
October 28	Independent	Pittsburgh	No. 14 Notre Dame	Notre Dame Stadium • South Bend, IN (rivalry)	L 7–58
November 4	Independent	No. 15 Notre Dame	Clemson	Memorial Stadium • Clemson, SC	W 31–23
November 18	Independent	Wake Forest	No. 19 Notre Dame	Notre Dame Stadium • South Bend, IN	L 7–45
November 25	SEC	No. 24 Clemson	South Carolina	Williams–Brice Stadium • Columbia, SC (rivalry)	W 16–7
November 25	SEC	No. 5 Florida State	Florida	Ben Hill Griffin Stadium • Gainesville, FL (rivalry)	W 24–15
November 25	SEC	No. 1 Georgia	Georgia Tech	Bobby Dodd Stadium • Atlanta, GA (Clean, Old-Fashioned Hate)	L 23–31
November 25	SEC	Kentucky	No. 10 Louisville	Cardinal Stadium • Louisville, KY (Governor's Cup)	L 31–38

=== ACC vs Group of Five matchups ===
The following games include ACC teams competing against teams from the American, C-USA, MAC, Mountain West, or Sun Belt.

Date	Conference	Visitor	Home	Site	Score
September 1	MAC	Miami (OH)	Miami	Hard Rock Stadium • Miami Gardens, FL	W 38–3
September 2	MAC	Northern Illinois	Boston College	Alumni Stadium • Chestnut Hill, MA	L 24–27^{OT}
September 2	Sun Belt	Old Dominion	Virginia Tech	Lane Stadium • Blacksburg, VA	W 36–17
September 9	Sun Belt	Southern Miss	No. 4 Florida State	Doak Campbell Stadium • Tallahassee, FL	W 66–13
September 9	Sun Belt	Appalachian State	No. 17 North Carolina	Kenan Stadium • Chapel Hill, NC	W 40–34^{2OT}
September 9	MAC	Western Michigan	Syracuse	JMA Wireless Dome • Syracuse, NY	W 48–8
September 9	Sun Belt	James Madison	Virginia	Scott Stadium • Charlottesville, VA	L 35–36
September 16	American	Florida Atlantic	Clemson	Memorial Stadium • Clemson, SC	W 48–14
September 16	Sun Belt	Wake Forest	Old Dominion	S.B. Ballard Stadium • Norfolk, VA	W 27–24
September 23	American	No. 20 Miami	Temple	Lincoln Financial Field • Philadelphia, PA	W 41–7
September 23	Sun Belt	Virginia Tech	Marshall	Joan C. Edwards Stadium • Huntington, WV	L 17–24
September 30	MAC	Bowling Green	Georgia Tech	Bobby Dodd Stadium • Atlanta, GA	L 27–38
October 7	Sun Belt	Marshall	NC State	Carter–Finley Stadium • Raleigh, NC	W 48–41

=== ACC vs FBS independents matchups ===
The following games include ACC teams competing against FBS independents Army, UConn, or UMass (but excluding independent Notre Dame, which appears in the Power Five section above).

Date	Visitor	Home	Site	Score
August 31	NC State	UConn	Rentschler Field • East Hartford, CT	W 24–14
September 23	No. 18 Duke	UConn	Rentschler Field • East Hartford, CT	W 41–7
September 23	Army	Syracuse	JMA Wireless Dome • Syracuse, NY	W 29–16
October 7	Boston College	Army	Michie Stadium • West Point, NY	W 27–24
October 28	UConn	Boston College	Alumni Stadium • Chestnut Hill, MA	W 21–14

=== ACC vs FCS matchups ===
The Football Championship Subdivision comprises 13 conferences and two independent programs.

Date	Visitor	Home	Site	Score
August 31	Elon	Wake Forest	Allegacy Federal Credit Union Stadium • Winston-Salem, NC	W 31–17
September 2	Wofford	Pittsburgh	Acrisure Stadium • Pittsburgh, PA	W 45–7
September 2	Colgate	Syracuse	JMA Wireless Dome • Syracuse, NY	W 65–0
September 7	Murray State	Louisville	Cardinal Stadium • Louisville, KY	W 56–0
September 9	Holy Cross	Boston College	Alumni Stadium • Chestnut Hill, MA	W 31–28
September 9	Charleston Southern	No. 25 Clemson	Memorial Stadium • Clemson, SC	W 66–17
September 9	Lafayette	No. 21 Duke	Wallace Wade Stadium • Durham, NC	W 42–7
September 9	South Carolina State	Georgia Tech	Bobby Dodd Stadium • Atlanta, GA	W 48–13
September 14	Bethune–Cookman	No. 22 Miami	Hard Rock Stadium • Miami Gardens, FL	W 48–7
September 16	VMI	NC State	Carter–Finley Stadium • Raleigh, NC	W 45–7
October 7	William & Mary	Virginia	Scott Stadium • Charlottesville, VA	W 27–13
November 4	Campbell	North Carolina	Kenan Stadium • Chapel Hill, NC	W 59–7
November 18	North Alabama	No. 4 Florida State	Doak Campbell Stadium • Tallahassee, FL	W 58–13

=== Records against other conferences ===
Regular season

Power 5 conferences	Record
Big Ten	4–3
Big 12	0–2
Notre Dame	2–4
Pac-12	0–0
SEC	6–4
Power 5 total	12–13
Other FBS conferences	Record
American	2–0
C–USA	0–0
Independents (Excluding Notre Dame)	5–0
MAC	2–2
Mountain West	0–0
Sun Belt	5–2
Other FBS total	14–4
FCS opponents	Record
Football Championship Subdivision	13–0
Total non-conference record	38–18

Post Season

Power 5 conferences	Record
Big Ten	0–1
Big 12	1–2
Notre Dame	0–0
Pac-12	0–1
SEC	1–1
Power 5 total	2–5
Other FBS conferences	Record
American	2–1
C–USA	0–0
Independents (Excluding Notre Dame)	0–0
MAC	0–0
Mountain West	0–0
Sun Belt	1–0
Other FBS total	3–1
Total bowl record	5–6

== Postseason ==
The bowl games will begin on December 16, 2023, and will end with the College Football Playoff National Championship on January 8, 2024.

=== Bowl games ===
Legend
ACC win
ACC loss
Cancellation

For the 2020–2025 bowl cycle, The ACC will have annually ten appearances in the following bowls: Orange Bowl and Peach Bowl (unless they are selected for playoffs filled by a SEC and at-large team if champion is in the playoffs), Military Bowl, Duke's Mayo Bowl, Gator Bowl, Pop-Tarts Bowl, Fenway Bowl, ReliaQuest Bowl, Holiday Bowl and Sun Bowl. The ACC teams will go to a New Year's Six bowl if a team finishes higher than the champions of Power Five conferences in the final College Football Playoff rankings. The ACC champion are also eligible for the College Football Playoff if they're among the top four teams in the final CFP ranking.

Bowl game	Date	Site	Television	Time (EST)	ACC team	Opponent	Score	Attendance
Boca Raton Bowl	December 21	FAU Stadium • Boca Raton, FL	ESPN	8:00 p.m.	**Syracuse**	South Florida	**L** 0–45	20,711
Gasparilla Bowl	December 22	Raymond James Stadium • Tampa, FL	ESPN	6:30 p.m.	**Georgia Tech**	UCF	**W** 30–17	30,281
Birmingham Bowl	December 23	Protective Stadium • Birmingham, AL	ABC	Noon	**Duke**	Troy	**W** 17–10	20,023
Military Bowl	December 27	Navy–Marine Corps Memorial Stadium • Annapolis, MD	ESPN	2:00 p.m.	**Virginia Tech**	Tulane	**W** 41–20	35,849
Duke's Mayo Bowl	December 27	Bank of America Stadium • Charlotte, NC	ESPN	5:30 p.m.	**North Carolina**	West Virginia	**L** 10–30	42,925
Holiday Bowl	December 27	Petco Park • San Diego, CA	Fox	8:00 p.m.	No. 15 **Louisville**	USC	**L** 28–42	35,317
Fenway Bowl	December 28	Fenway Park • Boston, MA	ESPN	11:00 a.m.	**Boston College**	No. 24 SMU	**W** 23–14	16,238
Pinstripe Bowl	December 28	Yankee Stadium • Bronx, NY	ESPN	2:15 p.m.	**Miami**	Rutgers	**L** 24–31	35,314
Pop-Tarts Bowl	December 28	Camping World Stadium • Orlando, FL	ESPN	5:45 p.m.	No. 18 **NC State**	No. 25 Kansas State	**L** 19–28	31,111
Gator Bowl	December 29	EverBank Stadium • Jacksonville, FL	ESPN	Noon	No. 22 **Clemson**	Kentucky	**W** 38–35	40,132
**New Year's Six Bowls**
Orange Bowl	December 30	Hard Rock Stadium • Miami Gardens, FL	ESPN	4:00 p.m.	No. 5 **Florida State**	No. 6 Georgia	**L** 3–63	63,324

Rankings are from CFP rankings. All times Eastern Time Zone. ACC teams shown in bold.

== Awards and honors ==
=== Player of the week honors ===
Week	Quarterback		Running Back		Receiver		Offensive Line		Defensive Line		Linebacker		Defensive Back		Specialist			Rookie		
Week	Player	Team	Player	Team	Player	Team	Player	Team	Player	Team	Player	Team	Player	Team	Player	Team	Position	Player	Team	Position
Week 1	Jordan Travis	Florida State	British Brooks	North Carolina	Keon Coleman	Florida State	Bless Harris	Florida State	Kaimon Rucker	North Carolina	Payton Wilson	NC State	Jeremiah Lewis	Duke	Brock Travelstead	Louisville	K	Ike Daniels	Syracuse	RB
Week 2	Tyler Van Dyke	Miami	Demond Claiborne	Wake Forest	Jacolby George	Miami	Anez Cooper	Miami	Kyle Kennard	Georgia Tech	Keli Lawson	Virginia Tech	Jaden Davis	Miami	Matthew Dennis	Wake Forest	K	Anthony Colandrea	Virginia	QB
Week 2	Tyler Van Dyke	Miami	Omarion Hampton	North Carolina	Jacolby George	Miami	D'Mitri Emmanuel	Florida State	Kyle Kennard	Georgia Tech	Keli Lawson	Virginia Tech	Jaden Davis	Miami	Peter Moore	Virginia Tech	P	Anthony Colandrea	Virginia	QB
Week 3	Garrett Shrader	Syracuse	LeQuint Allen	Syracuse	Nate McCollum	North Carolina	Christopher Bleich	Syracuse	Jasheen Davis	Wake Forest	Jacob Roberts	Wake Forest	Cam'Ron Kelly	Louisville	Julian Gray	NC State	WR/KR	Tyler Brown	Clemson	WR
Week 4	Jack Plummer	Louisville	Jawhar Jordan	Louisville	Malik Washington	Virginia	Bryan Hudson	Louisville	Kaimon Rucker (2)	North Carolina	Kalen DeLoach	Florida State	Jaylon King	Georgia Tech	Alijah Huzzie	North Carolina	PR	Kevin Concepcion	NC State	WR
Week 4	Jack Plummer	Louisville	Jawhar Jordan	Louisville	Malik Washington	Virginia	Bryan Hudson	Louisville	Kaimon Rucker (2)	North Carolina	Kalen DeLoach	Florida State	Renardo Green	Florida State	Alijah Huzzie	North Carolina	PR	Kevin Concepcion	NC State	WR
Week 5	Kyron Drones	Virginia Tech	Bhayshul Tuten	Virginia Tech	Tyler Brown	Clemson	Christian Mahogany	Boston College	T. J. Parker	Clemson	Payton Wilson (2)	NC State	Cam'Ron Kelly (2)	Louisville	Brock Travelstead (2)	Louisville	K/P	Tyler Brown (2)	Clemson	WR
Week 6	Drake Maye	North Carolina	Trey Benson	Florida State	Nate McCollum (2)	North Carolina	Darius Washington	Florida State	Mason Reiger	Louisville	Payton Wilson (3)	NC State	Devin Neal	Louisville	Bhayshul Tuten	Virginia Tech	RB/KR	Kevin Concepcion (2)	NC State	WR
Week 7	Drake Maye (2)	North Carolina	Omarion Hampton (2)	North Carolina	Devontez Walker	North Carolina	Jacob Monk	Duke	Antwaun Powell-Ryland	Virginia Tech	Cedric Gray	North Carolina	M.J. Devonshire	Pittsburgh	Keon Coleman	Florida State	WR/PR	Sam Okunlola	Pittsburgh	DE
Week 7	Drake Maye (2)	North Carolina	Omarion Hampton (2)	North Carolina	Devontez Walker	North Carolina	Jacob Monk	Duke	Antwaun Powell-Ryland	Virginia Tech	Tre Freeman	Duke	M.J. Devonshire	Pittsburgh	Keon Coleman	Florida State	WR/PR	Sam Okunlola	Pittsburgh	DE
Week 8	Jordan Travis (2)	Florida State	Kye Robichaux	Boston College	Malik Washington (2)	Virginia	Christian Mahogany (2)	Boston College	Rueben Bain Jr.	Miami	James Jackson	Virginia	Elijah Jones	Boston College	Deuce Spann	Florida State	WR/KR	Rueben Bain Jr.	Miami	DL
Week 8	Thomas Castellanos	Boston College	Kye Robichaux	Boston College	Malik Washington (2)	Virginia	Christian Mahogany (2)	Boston College	Rueben Bain Jr.	Miami	James Jackson	Virginia	Elijah Jones	Boston College	Deuce Spann	Florida State	WR/KR	Rueben Bain Jr.	Miami	DL
Week 9	Haynes King	Georgia Tech	Jawhar Jordan (2)	Louisville	Malik Washington (3)	Virginia	Weston Franklin	Georgia Tech	Ruben Bain Jr. (2)	Miami	Patyon Wilson (4)	NC State	Kamren Kinchens	Miami	Andres Borregales	Miami	K	Kevin Concepcion (3)	NC State	WR
Week 10	Jordan Travis (3)	Florida State	Phil Mafah	Clemson	Ja'Khi Douglas	Florida State	Will Putnam	Clemson	Ryan Smith	Duke	Jeremiah Trotter Jr.	Clemson	Elijah Jones (2)	Boston College	Aidan Swanson	Clemson	P	Mark Fletcher Jr.	Miami	RB
Week 11	Kyron Drones (2)	Virginia Tech	Omarion Hampton (3)	North Carolina	Jacolby George (2)	Miami	Christopher Bleich (2)	Syracuse	Ashton Gillotte	Louisville	Kalen DeLoach (2)	Florida State	Dorian Strong	Virginia Tech	Noah Burnette	North Carolina	K	Shelton Lewis	Clemson	CB
Week 11	Kyron Drones (2)	Virginia Tech	Dan Villari	Syracuse	Jacolby George (2)	Miami	Christopher Bleich (2)	Syracuse	Ashton Gillotte	Louisville	Kalen DeLoach (2)	Florida State	Dorian Strong	Virginia Tech	Noah Burnette	North Carolina	K	Shelton Lewis	Clemson	CB
Week 12	Brennan Armstrong	NC State	Omarion Hampton (4)	North Carolina	Xavier Restrepo	Miami	Will Putnam (2)	Clemson	Dayon Hayes	Pittsburgh	Kyle Efford	Georgia Tech	Nate Wiggins	Clemson	Will Bettridge	Virginia	K	Anthony Colandrea (2)	Virginia	QB
Week 12	Jack Plummer (2)	Louisville	Omarion Hampton (4)	North Carolina	Xavier Restrepo	Miami	Will Putnam (2)	Clemson	Dayon Hayes	Pittsburgh	Kyle Efford	Georgia Tech	Nate Wiggins	Clemson	Will Bettridge	Virginia	K	Anthony Colandrea (2)	Virginia	QB
Week 13	Brennan Armstrong (2)	NC State	Trey Benson (2)	Florida State	Kevin Concepcion	NC State	Matt Lee	Miami	Jared Verse	Florida State	Payton Wilson (5)	NC State	Khalil Barnes	Clemson	Jonathan Weitz	Clemson	PK	Kevin Concepcion (4)	NC State	WR

=== All-conference teams ===
First team

Position	Player	Team
First team offense
QB	Jordan Travis	Florida State
RB	Omarion Hampton	North Carolina
RB	Jawhar Jordan	Louisville
WR	Malik Washington	Virginia
WR	Keon Coleman	Florida State
WR	Xavier Restrepo	Miami
TE	Bryson Nesbit	North Carolina
All Purpose Back	Keon Coleman	Florida State
T	Graham Barton	Duke
T	Darius Washington	Florida State
G	Christian Mahogany	Boston College
G	D'Mitri Emmanuel	Florida State
C	Bryan Hudson	Louisville
First team defense
DE	Ashton Gillotte	Louisville
DE	Jared Verse	Florida State
DT	Tyler Davis	Clemson
DT	DeWayne Carter	Duke
LB	Payton Wilson	NC State
LB	Jeremiah Trotter Jr.	Clemson
LB	Kalen DeLoach (tie)	Florida State
LB	Cedric Gray (tie)	North Carolina
CB	Nate Wiggins	Clemson
CB	Elijah Jones	Boston College
S	Kamren Kinchens	Miami
S	Jonas Sanker	Virginia
First team special teams
PK	Andy Borregales	Miami
P	Porter Wilson	Duke
SP	Keon Coleman	Florida State

Second team

Position	Player	Team
Second team offense
QB	Drake Maye	North Carolina
RB	Trey Benson	Florida State
RB	LeQuint Allen	Syracuse
WR	Kevin Concepcion	NC State
WR	Jamari Thrash	Louisville
WR	Jordan Moore	Duke
TE	Jaheim Bell	Florida State
All Purpose Back	Bhayshul Tuten	Virginia Tech
T	Jalen Rivers	Miami
T	Ozzy Trapilo	Boston College
G	Jacob Monk	Duke
G	Michael Jurgens	Wake Forest
C	Matt Lee	Miami
Second team defense
DE	Antwaun Powell-Ryland	Virginia Tech
DE	Kaimon Rucker	North Carolina
DT	Braden Fiske	Florida State
DT	Joshua Farmer	Florida State
LB	Francisco Mauigoa	Miami
LB	Marlowe Wax	Syracuse
LB	Tre Freeman (tie)	Duke
LB	Barrett Carter	Clemson
CB	Renardo Green	Florida State
CB	M.J. Devonshire	Pittsburgh
S	Malik Mustapha	Wake Forest
S	Jaylon King	Georgia Tech
Second team special teams
PK	Noah Burnette	North Carolina
P	Alex Mastromanno	Florida State
SP	Brashard Smith	Miami

Third team

Position	Player	Team
Third team offense
QB	Jack Plummer	Louisville
RB	Jamal Haynes	Georgia Tech
RB	Jordan Waters	Duke
WR	Devontez Walker	North Carolina
WR	Jacolby George	Miami
WR	Johnny Wilson	Florida State
TE	Jake Briningstool	Clemson
All Purpose Back	Jawhar Jordan	Louisville
T	Blake Miller	Clemson
T	Anthony Belton	NC State
G	Michael Gonzalez	Louisville
G	Willie Lampkin	North Carolina
C	Will Putnam	Clemson
Third team defense
DE	Rueben Bain Jr.	Miami
DE	Jasheen Davis	Wake Forest
DT	Aeneas Peebles	Duke
DT	Ruke Orhorhoro	Clemson
LB	Vinny DePalma	Boston College
LB	Tatum Bethune	Florida State
LB	Power Echols	North Carolina
CB	Aydan White	NC State
CB	Dorian Strong	Virginia Tech
S	Shyheim Brown	Florida State
S	Devin Neal	Louisville
Third team special teams
PK	Ryan Fitzgerald	Florida State
P	Jack Stonehouse	Syracuse
SP	Tucker Holloway	Virginia Tech

=== ACC individual awards ===
ACC Player of the Year

Jordan Travis, QB, Florida State

ACC Rookie of the Year

Kevin Concepcion, WR, NC State

ACC Coach of the Year

Mike Norvell – Florida State

ACC Offensive Player of the Year

Jordan Travis, QB, Florida State

ACC Offensive Rookie of the Year

Kevin Concepcion, WR, NC State

Jacobs Blocking Trophy

Bryan Hudson – Louisville

ACC Defensive Player of the Year

Payton Wilson, LB, NC State

ACC Defensive Rookie of the Year

Rueben Bain Jr., DL, Miami

=== All-Americans ===
==== Consensus All-Americans ====
Currently, the NCAA compiles consensus all-America teams in the sports of Division I FBS football and Division I men's basketball using a point system computed from All-America teams named by coaches associations or media sources. Players are chosen against other players playing at their position only. To be selected a consensus All-American, players must be chosen to the first team on at least half of the five official selectors as recognized by the NCAA. Second- and third-team honors are used to break ties. Players named first-team by all five selectors are deemed unanimous All-Americans. Currently, the NCAA recognizes All-Americans selected by the AP, AFCA, FWAA, TSN, and the WCFF to determine consensus and unanimous All-Americans.

2023 Consensus All-Americans
Unanimous	Consensus
Payton Wilson – NC State	None

==== Associated Press ====
2023 AP All-Americans
First Team	Second Team	Third Team
Payton Wilson – NC State	Jeremiah Trotter Jr. – Clemson; Jared Verse – Florida State; Omarion Hampton – North Carolina; Malik Washington – Virginia	Bralen Trice – Florida State

==== AFCA ====
2023 AFCA All-Americans
First Team	Second Team
Jared Verse – Florida State; Payton Wilson – NC State; James Rosenberry – Florida State	Malik Washington – Virginia; Graham Barton – Duke; Omarion Hampton – North Carolina; Jeremiah Trotter Jr. – Clemson; Joe Shimko – NC State

==== FWAA ====
2023 FWAA All-Americans
First Team	Second Team
Payton Wilson – NC State	Malik Washington – Virginia

==== The Sporting News ====
2023 Sporting News All-Americans
First Team	Second Team
Payton Wilson – NC State	Omarion Hampton – North Carolina; Jeremiah Trotter Jr. – Clemson; Alex Mastromanno – Florida State; Bhayshul Tuten – Virginia Tech

==== WCFF ====
2023 Walter Camp All-Americans
First Team	Second Team
Omarion Hampton – North Carolina; Payton Wilson – NC State	Ashton Gillotte – Louisville; Malik Washington – Virginia

== Home game attendance ==
Team	Stadium	Capacity	Game 1	Game 2	Game 3	Game 4	Game 5	Game 6	Game 7	Total	Average	% of capacity
Boston College	Alumni Stadium	44,500	30,122	40,122	41,383	41,868†	36,902	33,665	30,569	254,651	36,379	81.75%
Clemson	Memorial Stadium	81,500	81,500	81,295	81,500	80,810	81,500	81,426	81,305	569,336	81,334	99.8%
Duke	Wallace Wade Stadium	40,004	31,638	17,481	18,141	**40,768**†	31,833	18,277	17,639	175,777	25,111	62.77%
Florida State	Doak Campbell Stadium	79,560	74,467	79,560	79,560	79,560	79,560	79,560		472,267	78,711	98.93%
Georgia Tech	Bobby Dodd Stadium	55,000	31,452	30,097	35,656	35,945	33,332	51,447		217,929	36,322	66.04%
Louisville	L&N Federal Credit Union Stadium	60,800	45,273	48,294	59,081	52,319	49,945	44,628	59,225†	358,765	51,252	84.3%
Miami	Hard Rock Stadium	65,326	49,024	48,792	40,077	58,045	48,562	58,503†	44,996	347,999	49,714	76.1%
North Carolina	Kenan Memorial Stadium	50,500	50,500	45,151	50,500	50,500	50,500	47,667	50,500	345,318	49,331	97.69%
NC State	Carter–Finley Stadium	56,919	56,919	56,919	56,919	56,919	56,919	56,919	56,919	398,433	56,919	100%
Pittsburgh	Acrisure Stadium	68,400	45,096	49,398	48,544	46,296	57,557	41,842		288,733	48,122	70.35%
Syracuse	JMA Wireless Dome	49,057	32,465	32,637	37,594	40,973	42,523	35,018		221,210	36,868	75.15%
Virginia	Scott Stadium	61,500	56,508	42,979	38,289	42,606	36,400	42,976		259,758	43,293	70.4%
Virginia Tech	Lane Stadium	65,632	65,632	65,632	65,632	65,632	60,236	65,632		388,396	64,733	98.63%
Wake Forest	Allegacy Federal Credit Union Stadium	31,500	30,028	28,363	**32,528**†	**31,855**	31,288	29,591		183,653	30,609	97.17%

Bold – Exceeded capacity
† Season High

== NFL draft ==
The NFL draft was held at Campus Martius Park in Detroit. The following list includes all ACC players in the draft.

=== List of selections ===
Player	Position	School	Draft Round	Round Pick	Overall Pick	Team
Drake Maye	QB	North Carolina	1	3	3	New England Patriots
Jared Verse	DE	Florida State	1	19	19	Los Angeles Rams
Graham Barton	C	Duke	1	26	26	Tampa Bay Buccaneers
Nate Wiggins	CB	Clemson	1	30	30	Baltimore Ravens
Keon Coleman	WR	Florida State	2	1	33	Buffalo Bills
Ruke Orhorhoro	DT	Clemson	2	3	35	Atlanta Falcons
Braden Fiske	DT	Florida State	2	7	39	Los Angeles Rams
Renardo Green	CB	Florida State	2	32	64	San Francisco 49ers
Trey Benson	RB	Florida State	3	2	66	Arizona Cardinals
Matt Goncalves	OT	Pittsburgh	3	15	79	Indianapolis Colts
Elijah Jones	CB	Boston College	3	26	90	Arizona Cardinals
DeWayne Carter	DT	Duke	3	31	95	Buffalo Bills
Jarrian Jones	CB	Florida State	3	32	96	Jacksonville Jaguars
Payton Wilson	LB	NC State	3	34	98	Pittsburgh Steelers
Kamren Kinchens	S	Miami	3	35	99	Los Angeles Rams
Cedric Gray	LB	North Carolina	4	6	106	Tennessee Titans
Devontez Walker	WR	North Carolina	4	13	113	Baltimore Ravens
Malik Mustapha	S	Wake Forest	4	24	124	San Francisco 49ers
Will Shipley	RB	Clemson	4	27	127	Philadelphia Eagles
Isaac Guerendo	RB	Louisville	4	29	129	San Francisco 49ers
Xavier Thomas	DE	Clemson	5	3	138	Arizona Cardinals
Jarvis Brownlee Jr.	CB	Louisville	5	11	146	Tennessee Titans
Jeremiah Trotter Jr.	LB	Clemson	5	20	155	Philadelphia Eagles
Jamari Thrash	WR	Louisville	5	21	156	Cleveland Browns
Jacob Monk	C	Duke	5	28	163	Green Bay Packers
Bub Means	WR	Pittsburgh	5	35	170	New Orleans Saints
Jordan Travis	QB	Florida State	5	36	171	New York Jets
Caelen Carson	CB	Wake Forest	5	39	174	Dallas Cowboys
Malik Washington	WR	Virginia	6	1	184	Miami Dolphins
Johnny Wilson	WR	Florida State	6	2	185	Philadelphia Eagles
Dylan McMahon	OG	NC State	6	7	190	Philadelphia Eagles
Tyler Davis	DT	Clemson	6	13	196	Los Angeles Rams
Jawhar Jordan	RB	Louisville	6	21	205	Houston Texans
Christian Mahogany	OG	Boston College	6	26	210	Detroit Lions
Jaden Davis	CB	Miami	7	1	226	Arizona Cardinals
MJ Devonshire	CB	Pittsburgh	7	4	229	Las Vegas Raiders
Michael Jurgens	C	Wake Forest	7	5	230	Minnesota Vikings
Jaheim Bell	TE	Florida State	7	6	231	New England Patriots
Matt Lee	C	Miami	7	12	237	Cincinnati Bengals
James Williams	S	Miami	7	17	242	Tennessee Titans
Tatum Bethune	LB	Florida State	7	26	251	San Francisco 49ers

=== Total picks by school ===
Team	Round 1	Round 2	Round 3	Round 4	Round 5	Round 6	Round 7	Total
Boston College	–	–	1	–	–	1	–	2
Clemson	1	1	–	1	2	1	–	6
Duke	1	–	1	–	1	–	–	3
Florida State	1	3	2	–	1	1	2	10
Georgia Tech	–	–	–	–	–	–	–	0
Louisville	–	–	–	1	2	1	–	4
Miami	–	–	1	–	–	–	3	4
NC State	–	–	1	–	–	1	–	2
North Carolina	1	–	–	2	–	–	–	3
Pittsburgh	–	–	1	–	1	–	1	3
Syracuse	–	–	–	–	–	–	–	0
Virginia	–	–	–	–	–	1	–	1
Virginia Tech	–	–	–	–	–	–	–	0
Wake Forest	–	–	–	1	1	–	1	3
Total	4	4	7	5	8	6	7	41
