= Kamren Kinchens =

American football player (born 2002)

No. 5 – Los Angeles Rams
- Position: Free safety
- Roster status: Active

Personal information
- Born: September 29, 2002 (age 24); Miami, Florida, U.S.
- Listed height: 6 ft 0 in (1.83 m)
- Listed weight: 201 lb (91 kg)

Career information
- High school: Miami Northwestern (FL)
- College: Miami (FL) (2021–2023)
- NFL draft: 2024: 3rd round, 99th overall pick

Career history
- Los Angeles Rams (2024–present)

Awards and highlights
- First-team All-American (2022); 2× First-team All-ACC (2022, 2023)

Career NFL statistics as of Week 10, 2026
- Total tackles: 181
- Sacks: 0.5
- Forced fumbles: 1
- Fumble recoveries: 3
- Pass deflections: 15
- Interceptions: 7
- Defensive touchdowns: 1
- Stats at Pro Football Reference

Kamren Kinchens (kin-CHINZ; born September 29, 2002) is an American professional football free safety for the Los Angeles Rams of the National Football League (NFL). He played college football for the Miami Hurricanes, earning All-American honors in 2022.

== Early life ==
Kinchens was born on September 29, 2002. He attended Miami Northwestern Senior High School in Miami, Florida. A four-star recruit, he committed to play college football at the University of Miami.

== College career ==
Kinchens played in all 12 games and started the final five of his true freshman year at Miami in 2021 and had 44 tackles. He returned to Miami as a starter in 2022. Against Georgia Tech, he tied a school record with three interceptions. He finished the year with 59 tackles, six interceptions, and one touchdown. He was named a first-team All-American by CBS Sports. Kinchens declared for the 2024 NFL draft following the 2023 season.

== Professional career ==
Pre-draft measurables
Height	Weight	Arm length	Hand span	Wingspan	40-yard dash	10-yard split	20-yard split	Vertical jump	Broad jump	Bench press
5 ft 11 1/4 in (1.81 m)	203 lb (92 kg)	31 1/4 in (0.79 m)	9 3/4 in (0.25 m)	6 ft 3 in (1.91 m)	4.62 s	1.53 s	2.59 s	35.0 in (0.89 m)	9 ft 2 in (2.79 m)	13 reps
All values from NFL Combine/Pro Day

Kinchens was selected by the Los Angeles Rams in the third round with the 99th overall selection in the 2024 NFL draft.

In a Week 9 matchup at the Seattle Seahawks, Kinchens intercepted two passes by Seahawks quarterback Geno Smith, including one that was returned for 103-yard touchdown, the longest defensive touchdown scored in Rams history, earning him the NFC Defensive Player of the Week. He won the award a second time in Week 11 after recording eight tackles, one fumble, and an interception against the New England Patriots.

== NFL career statistics ==
Legend
	Led the league
**Bold**	Career high

=== Regular season ===
Year	Team	Games		Tackles					Interceptions						Fumbles				
Year	Team	GP	GS	Cmb	Solo	Ast	Sck	TFL	Int	Yds	Avg	Lng	TD	PD	FF	Fum	FR	Yds	TD
2024	LAR	**17**	4	57	36	21	0.0	**1**	**4**	**123**	**30.8**	**103**	**1**	**6**	**1**	**1**	1	0	0
2025	LAR	**17**	**8**	**84**	**56**	**28**	0.0	0	2	53	26.5	31	0	**6**	0	0	**2**	**13**	0
Career		34	12	141	92	49	0.0	1	6	176	29.3	103	1	12	1	1	3	13	0

=== Postseason ===
Year	Team	Games		Tackles					Interceptions						Fumbles				
Year	Team	GP	GS	Cmb	Solo	Ast	Sck	TFL	Int	Yds	Avg	Lng	TD	PD	FF	Fum	FR	Yds	TD
2024	LAR	2	1	11	**8**	3	0.0	0	0	0	0.0	0	0	0	0	0	0	0	0
2025	LAR	**3**	**2**	**13**	**8**	**5**	**1.0**	**1**	0	0	0.0	0	0	**1**	0	0	0	0	0
Career		5	3	24	16	8	1.0	1	0	0	0.0	0	0	1	0	0	0	0	0
