= Matt Lee (American football) =

American football player (born 2001)

Profile
- Position: Center

Personal information
- Born: June 6, 2001 (age 25); Oviedo, Florida, U.S.
- Listed height: 6 ft 4 in (1.93 m)
- Listed weight: 310 lb (141 kg)

Career information
- High school: Hagerty (Oviedo, Florida)
- College: UCF (2019–2022); Miami (FL) (2023)
- NFL draft: 2024: 7th round, 237th overall pick

Career history
- Cincinnati Bengals (2024–2025)

Awards and highlights
- First-team All-AAC (2020); 2× Second-team All-ACC (2022, 2023); Third-team All-AAC (2021)

Career NFL statistics as of 2025
- Games played: 22
- Games started: 1
- Stats at Pro Football Reference

Matthew Lee (born June 6, 2001) is an American professional football center. He played college football for the UCF Knights and Miami Hurricanes.

== Early life ==
Lee was born in Oviedo, Florida, on June 6, 2001. He attended Paul J. Hagerty High School. Coming out of high school, Lee initially decided to commit to play college football for the South Florida Bulls. However, Lee decided to flip his commitment to play for the UCF Knights.

== College career ==
In Lee's first season at UCF in 2019, he played in four games and would redshirt on the year. During the 2020 season, Lee would play in ten games, starting in all ten, where for his performance he was named first-team all-conference. In 2021, Lee played in 12 games, starting all 12, where for his performance he earned third team all conference honors. During the 2022 season, Lee would appear in 13 games, making 13 starts. For his performance on the season, Lee earned second team all conference honors. After the conclusion of the 2022 season, Lee decided to enter the NCAA transfer portal. Matt Lee was a four-star transfer and according to On3’s Transfer Portal Rankings, he was the second-best interior lineman and highest ranked center.

Lee transferred to play for the Miami Hurricanes. On the 2023 season, Lee graded out as a top 15 center and finished with a 76.5 overall grade by PFF. After the conclusion of the 2023 season, Lee declared for the 2024 NFL draft.

== Professional career ==
Pre-draft measurables
Height	Weight	Arm length	Hand span	Wingspan	40-yard dash	10-yard split	20-yard split	20-yard shuttle	Three-cone drill	Vertical jump	Broad jump	Bench press
6 ft 3 5/8 in (1.92 m)	301 lb (137 kg)	32 1/8 in (0.82 m)	9 1/4 in (0.23 m)	6 ft 6 5/8 in (2.00 m)	5.03 s	1.76 s	2.93 s	4.69 s	7.97 s	31.0 in (0.79 m)	9 ft 3 in (2.82 m)	25 reps
All values from NFL Combine/Pro Day

Lee was drafted by the Cincinnati Bengals in the seventh round with the 237th overall selection of the 2024 NFL draft. He appeared in all 17 games for Cincinnati, including one start, during his rookie campaign.

In 2025, Lee made five appearances for the Bengals, compiling 16 special teams snaps. On October 28, 2025, Lee was placed on injured reserve due to a knee injury he suffered in Week 8 against the New York Jets.

On April 7, 2026, Lee was waived by the Bengals.
