= Jeremiah Trotter Jr. =

American football player (born 2002)

No. 54 – Philadelphia Eagles
- Position: Linebacker
- Roster status: Active

Personal information
- Born: December 24, 2002 (age 23); Hainesport Township, New Jersey, U.S.
- Listed height: 6 ft 0 in (1.83 m)
- Listed weight: 225 lb (102 kg)

Career information
- High school: St. Joseph's Prep (Philadelphia, Pennsylvania)
- College: Clemson (2021–2023)
- NFL draft: 2024: 5th round, 155th overall pick

Career history
- Philadelphia Eagles (2024–present)

Awards and highlights
- Super Bowl champion (LIX); Second-team All-American (2022); First-team All-ACC (2023)

Career NFL statistics as of Week 8, 2025
- Total tackles: 36
- Sacks: 1
- Pass deflections: 1
- Stats at Pro Football Reference

Jeremiah Trotter Jr. (born December 24, 2002) is an American professional football linebacker for the Philadelphia Eagles of the National Football League (NFL). He played college football for the Clemson Tigers and was selected by the Eagles in the fifth round of the 2024 NFL draft. He is the son of former Eagles linebacker Jeremiah Trotter.

== Early life ==
Trotter grew up in Hainesport Township, New Jersey, and attended St. Joseph's Preparatory School in Philadelphia, Pennsylvania. He was selected to play in the 2021 All-American Bowl as a senior. Trotter was rated a four-star recruit and committed to play college football at Clemson over offers from South Carolina, Maryland, Georgia Tech, and Michigan State.

== College career ==
Trotter joined the Clemson Tigers as an early enrollee in January 2021. He played in 13 games as a freshman and finished the season with 22 tackles, one tackle for loss, and one sack. Trotter was named a starter at linebacker entering his sophomore season. He was named the Atlantic Coast Conference (ACC) Linebacker of the Week for Week 7 after making 13 tackles in a 34-28 win over Florida State. Trotter finished the season with 89 tackles, 13.5 tackles for loss, 6.5 sacks, two interceptions, and one forced fumble and was named a second-team All-American by the Associated Press.

=== College statistics ===
| Year | Team | Class | GP | Tackles | | | | | Interceptions | | | | | Fumbles | |
| Year | Team | Class | GP | Solo | Ast | Tot | Loss | Sk | Int | Yds | Avg | TD | PD | FF | FR |
|---|---|---|---|---|---|---|---|---|---|---|---|---|---|---|---|
| 2021 | Clemson | FR | 5 | 9 | 6 | 15 | 1.0 | 1.0 | 0 | 0 | 0.0 | 0 | 0 | 0 | 0 |
| 2022 | Clemson | SO | 14 | 50 | 39 | 89 | 13.5 | 6.5 | 2 | 35 | 17.5 | 1 | 5 | 1 | 0 |
| 2023 | Clemson | JR | 12 | 54 | 34 | 88 | 15.0 | 5.5 | 2 | 28 | 14.0 | 1 | 5 | 2 | 0 |
| Career | | | 31 | 113 | 79 | 192 | 29.5 | 13.0 | 4 | 63 | 15.8 | 2 | 10 | 3 | 0 |

== Professional career ==
Pre-draft measurables
| Height | Weight | Arm length | Hand span | Wingspan | 40-yard dash | 10-yard split | 20-yard split | 20-yard shuttle | Three-cone drill | Vertical jump | Broad jump | Bench press |
|---|---|---|---|---|---|---|---|---|---|---|---|---|
| 6 ft 0 in (1.83 m) | 228 lb (103 kg) | 31 1/2 in (0.80 m) | 9 1/4 in (0.23 m) | 6 ft 2 3/4 in (1.90 m) | 4.82 s | 1.64 s | 2.81 s | 4.40 s | 7.13 s | 33.0 in (0.84 m) | 9 ft 8 in (2.95 m) | 21 reps |
All values from NFL Combine/Pro Day

Trotter was selected by the Philadelphia Eagles in the fifth round, 155th overall, of the 2024 NFL draft. In his rookie season, he appeared in 17 games and one start, where he had a half-sack, 25 tackles, and one pass defended. Trotter made his first career fumble recovery in a Wild Card game against the Green Bay Packers. In the opening kick-off, Keisean Nixon fumbled the ball for the Packers (forced by Oren Burks) and Trotter recovered it. The Eagles scored a touchdown three plays later, and finished the game with a 22–10 win at home. He had one tackle in Super Bowl LIX, a 40–22 win over the Kansas City Chiefs.

== NFL career statistics ==
Legend
| Won the Super Bowl |

=== Regular season ===
| Year | Team | Games | | Tackles | | | | Fumbles | | | | Interceptions | | | | | |
| Year | Team | G | GS | Comb | Solo | Ast | Sack | FF | FR | Yds | TD | Int | Yds | Avg | Lng | TD | PD |
|---|---|---|---|---|---|---|---|---|---|---|---|---|---|---|---|---|---|
| 2024 | PHI | 17 | 1 | 25 | 9 | 16 | 0.5 | 0 | 0 | 0 | 0 | 0 | 0 | 0 | 0 | 0 | 1 |
| 2025 | PHI | 17 | 1 | 32 | 15 | 17 | 0.0 | 0 | 0 | 0 | 0 | 0 | 0 | 0 | 0 | 0 | 1 |
| Career | | 34 | 2 | 57 | 24 | 33 | 0.5 | 0 | 0 | 0 | 0 | 0 | 0 | 0 | 0 | 0 | 1 |

=== Postseason ===
| Year | Team | Games | | Tackles | | | | Interceptions | | | | | | Fumbles | | | |
| Year | Team | GP | GS | Comb | Solo | Ast | Sck | PD | Int | Yds | Avg | Lng | TD | FF | FR | Yds | TD |
|---|---|---|---|---|---|---|---|---|---|---|---|---|---|---|---|---|---|
| 2024 | PHI | 4 | 0 | 5 | 4 | 1 | 0.0 | 0 | 0 | 0 | 0 | 0 | 0 | 0 | 1 | 0 | 0 |
| 2025 | PHI | 1 | 0 | 2 | 1 | 1 | 0.0 | 0 | 0 | 0 | 0 | 0 | 0 | 0 | 0 | 0 | 0 |
| Career | | 5 | 0 | 7 | 5 | 2 | 0.0 | 0 | 0 | 0 | 0 | 0 | 0 | 0 | 1 | 0 | 0 |

== Personal life ==
Trotter is the son of Jeremiah Trotter, a 12-year NFL linebacker. His brother, Josiah, was a linebacker at the University of Missouri and was drafted by the Tampa Bay Buccaneers in the 2nd round of the 2026 NFL Draft. His cousin Terrance Ganaway is a former NFL running back.
