= Jordan Travis =

American football player (born 2000)

No. 13
- Position: Quarterback

Personal information
- Born: May 2, 2000 (age 26)
- Listed height: 6 ft 1 in (1.85 m)
- Listed weight: 200 lb (91 kg)

Career information
- High school: The Benjamin School (Palm Beach Gardens, Florida)
- College: Louisville (2018); Florida State (2019–2023)
- NFL draft: 2024: 5th round, 171st overall pick

Career history
- New York Jets (2024)

Awards and highlights
- ACC Player of the Year (2023); ACC Offensive Player of the Year (2023); First-team All-ACC (2023); Second-team All-ACC (2022)
- Stats at Pro Football Reference

Jordan Travis (born May 2, 2000) is an American former professional football quarterback. He played college football for the Louisville Cardinals and the Florida State Seminoles, winning ACC Player of the Year in 2023 before being selected by the New York Jets in the fifth round of the 2024 NFL draft.

On April 30, 2025, in a handwritten note, Travis announced his retirement from football citing his severe leg injury he suffered in November 2023, during his final season at Florida State.

== Early life ==
Travis attended Palm Beach Central High School. After his sophomore year, he transferred to The Benjamin School where he graduated in 2018. Coming out of high school he was ranked No. 24 dual-threat quarterback by 247Sports. His brother Devon Travis played baseball at Florida State under Mike Martin.

== College career ==
=== Louisville ===
Travis began his college career committing to the Louisville Cardinals over the Baylor Bears. Playing just 3 games, he completed 4-of-14 passing attempts and gained 40 yards rushing. In November 2018, Travis announced he would be transferring.

=== Florida State ===
On December 22, 2018, Travis announced he would be transferring to Florida State. He spent five seasons with the Florida State Seminoles, leading the team to ten win seasons as a redshirt junior and senior. He transferred to FSU in 2019 under head coach Willie Taggart but did not take the field until Taggart was fired. During his time as a Seminole, Travis became the first Florida State starting quarterback to win three games against rival Miami. In his senior season, Travis was named one of 20 semifinalists for the Davey O'Brien National Quarterback Award.

On November 18, 2023, Travis experienced a serious leg injury against North Alabama. He was fighting for extra yards, but a defender used a controversial hip-drop tackle on Travis's left leg. Travis's ankle was trapped under the weight of the defender's body and twisted awkwardly, causing a gruesome dislocation and fracture. An air cast was placed on his leg and he was carted off. On November 20, Travis announced that the injury was season-ending and would also end his college football career. Travis went on to finish fifth in Heisman Trophy voting behind Marvin Harrison Jr., Bo Nix, Michael Penix Jr., and eventual winner Jayden Daniels. Due in part to Travis' absence, Florida State became the first undefeated Power Five conference champion left out of the College Football Playoff. The CFP Selection Committee factors player availability into its selections, and committee chairman Boo Corrigan said the Seminoles were "a different team" without Travis. This decision was met with much controversy.

=== Statistics ===
Season	Team	Games			Passing								Rushing			
Season	Team	GP	GS	Record (Note: Accounts for only GS as a QB. On 9/26/20 Travis started at WR.)	Cmp	Att	Pct	Yds	Avg	TD	Int	Rtg	Att	Yds	Avg	TD
2018	Louisville	3	0	—	4	14	28.6	71	5.1	1	1	80.5	8	40	5.0	0
2019	Florida State	4	0	—	6	11	54.5	79	7.2	0	0	114.9	23	228	9.9	3
2020	Florida State	8	6	2–3	72	131	55.0	1,056	8.1	6	6	128.6	97	569	5.9	7
2021	Florida State	10	8	5–3	122	194	62.9	1,539	7.9	15	6	148.9	134	530	4.0	7
2022	Florida State	13	13	10–3	226	353	64.0	3,214	9.1	24	5	160.1	82	417	5.1	7
2023	Florida State	11	11	11–0	205	320	64.1	2,734	8.5	20	2	155.2	72	160	2.2	7
Career		49	38	28–9	635	1,023	62.1	8,693	8.5	66	20	150.8	416	1,934	4.6	31

== Professional career ==
Pre-draft measurables
Height	Weight	Arm length	Hand span
6 ft 1 1/8 in (1.86 m)	200 lb (91 kg)	31 3/8 in (0.80 m)	9 in (0.23 m)
All values from NFL Combine

Travis was selected by the New York Jets in the fifth round (171st overall) of the 2024 NFL draft.

Travis was placed on the reserve/non-football injury list on August 27, 2024 while still recovering from his severe leg injury. He never played a down during the 2024 season while on extended rehabilitation for his leg. On April 30, 2025, Travis announced that the rehab had been unsuccessful and that he had been advised to medically retire from football.
