= Tyler Davis (defensive lineman) =

American football player (born 2000)

No. 90 – Los Angeles Rams
- Position: Defensive end
- Roster status: Active

Personal information
- Born: November 1, 2000 (age 26); Apopka, Florida, U.S.
- Listed height: 6 ft 2 in (1.88 m)
- Listed weight: 306 lb (139 kg)

Career information
- High school: Wekiva (Apopka)
- College: Clemson (2019−2023)
- NFL draft: 2024: 6th round, 196th overall pick

Career history
- Los Angeles Rams (2024–present)

Awards and highlights
- 3× First-team All-ACC (2021, 2022, 2023); Second-team All-ACC (2019)

Career NFL statistics as of 2025
- Total tackles: 72
- Sacks: 1.5
- Fumble recoveries: 1
- Pass deflections: 2
- Stats at Pro Football Reference

Tyler Austin Davis (born November 1, 2000) is an American professional football defensive end for the Los Angeles Rams of the National Football League (NFL). He played college football for the Clemson Tigers.

== Early life ==
Davis played football at Wekiva High School in Apopka, Florida and was a four-star recruit. He committed to Clemson, turning down offers from Florida State, Miami, Georgia, Ohio State, among others.

== College career ==
Davis was named to the first team All-ACC in the 2021 season.

=== College statistics ===
Year	Team	Games	Tackles				
Year	Team	Games	Total	Solo	Ast	TFL	Sacks
2019	Clemson	15	45	21	24	10.5	6.5
2020	Clemson	7	14	9	5	5.0	2.0
2021	Clemson	8	21	8	13	1.5	1.5
2022	Clemson	12	31	14	17	9.5	5.5
2023	Clemson	13	34	12	22	3.5	0.5
Career		55	145	64	81	30.0	16.0

== Professional career ==
Pre-draft measurables
Height	Weight	Arm length	Hand span	Wingspan	40-yard dash	10-yard split	20-yard split	20-yard shuttle	Three-cone drill	Vertical jump	Broad jump	Bench press
6 ft 2 in (1.88 m)	301 lb (137 kg)	31 3/8 in (0.80 m)	9 1/4 in (0.23 m)	6 ft 3 in (1.91 m)	5.02 s	1.72 s	2.88 s	4.72 s	7.69 s	28.5 in (0.72 m)	9 ft 0 in (2.74 m)	29 reps
All values from NFL Combine/Pro Day

Davis was selected by the Los Angeles Rams with the 196th overall pick in the sixth round of the 2024 NFL draft.

== NFL career statistics ==
Legend
**Bold**	Career high

=== Regular season ===
Year	Team	Games		Tackles					Interceptions						Fumbles				
Year	Team	GP	GS	Cmb	Solo	Ast	Sck	TFL	Int	Yds	Avg	Lng	TD	PD	FF	Fum	FR	Yds	TD
2024	LAR	16	0	29	12	17	0.5	**2**	0	0	0.0	0	0	0	0	0	0	0	0
2025	LAR	**17**	**1**	**43**	**14**	**29**	**1.0**	1	0	0	0.0	0	0	**2**	0	0	**1**	0	0
Career		33	1	72	26	46	1.5	3	0	0	0.0	0	0	2	0	0	1	0	0

=== Postseason ===
Year	Team	Games		Tackles					Interceptions						Fumbles				
Year	Team	GP	GS	Cmb	Solo	Ast	Sck	TFL	Int	Yds	Avg	Lng	TD	PD	FF	Fum	FR	Yds	TD
2024	LAR	2	**1**	**7**	**3**	**4**	0.0	0	0	0	0.0	0	0	0	0	0	0	0	0
2025	LAR	**3**	0	5	1	**4**	0.0	0	0	0	0.0	0	0	0	0	0	0	0	0
Career		5	1	12	4	8	0.0	0	0	0	0.0	0	0	0	0	0	0	0	0
