= Bryan Hudson (American football) =

American football player (born 2001)

No. 60 – New York Giants
- Position: Center
- Roster status: Active

Personal information
- Born: January 11, 2001 (age 25)
- Listed height: 6 ft 5 in (1.96 m)
- Listed weight: 305 lb (138 kg)

Career information
- High school: Scott County (Georgetown, Kentucky)
- College: Virginia Tech (2019–2020); Louisville (2021–2023)
- NFL draft: 2024: undrafted

Career history
- Detroit Lions (2024)*; New England Patriots (2024); New York Giants (2024–present)
- * Offseason or practice squad member only

Awards and highlights
- First-team All-ACC (2023); Second-team All-ACC (2022); ACC Jacobs Blocking Trophy (2023)

Career NFL statistics as of Week 18, 2025
- Games played: 2
- Stats at Pro Football Reference

Bryan Hudson (born January 11, 2001) is an American professional football center for the New York Giants of the National Football League (NFL). He played college football for the Virginia Tech Hokies and the Louisville Cardinals.

== College career ==
Hudson played college football for the Virginia Tech Hokies from 2019 to 2020 and the Louisville Cardinals from 2021 to 2023. At Virginia Tech, he played in 21 games, starting in ten, earning second-team freshman All-America team from The Athletic in 2019. Hudson then transferred to Louisville where he would start in 32 of the 36 games he played. In 2022, he earned second-team All-ACC honors and in 2023, was named ACC Jacobs Blocking Trophy winner for the best blocker in the conference and first-team All-ACC.

== Professional career ==
Pre-draft measurables
| Height | Weight | Arm length | Hand span | Wingspan | 40-yard dash | 10-yard split | 20-yard split | 20-yard shuttle | Three-cone drill | Vertical jump | Broad jump |
|---|---|---|---|---|---|---|---|---|---|---|---|
| 6 ft 4 3/4 in (1.95 m) | 300 lb (136 kg) | 32 3/4 in (0.83 m) | 9 5/8 in (0.24 m) | 6 ft 8 1/4 in (2.04 m) | 5.26 s | 1.85 s | 2.95 s | 4.53 s | 7.46 s | 29 in (0.74 m) | 9 ft 5 in (2.87 m) |
All values from Pro Day

=== Detroit Lions ===
After not being selected in the 2024 NFL draft, Hudson signed with the Detroit Lions as an undrafted free agent. he was later released on August 26, 2024, as part of final roster cuts.

=== New England Patriots ===
On August 29, 2024, the New England Patriots signed Hudson to the practice squad. He was activated on October 5, 2024, but did not see any game action and returned to the practice squad on October 7. He was released on November 5, 2024.

=== New York Giants ===
On November 6, 2024, Hudson was signed by the New York Giants. He signed a reserve/future contract on January 6, 2025. Hudson was waived on August 26, 2025, as part of final roster cutdowns. On August 27, he signed to the practice squad. He was promoted to the active roster on December 27. On August 30, 2026, Hudson was announced as part of the Giants' initial 53-man roster for the 2026 season.
