= Christian Mahogany =

American football player (born 2000)

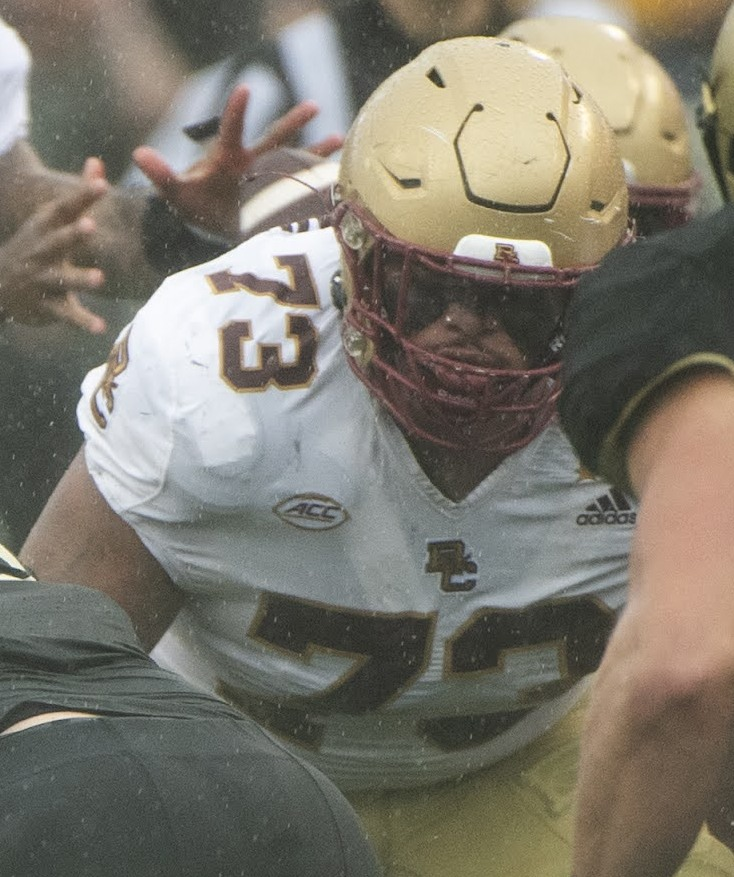
- Mahogany with Boston College in 2023

No. 73 – Detroit Lions
- Position: Guard
- Roster status: Active

Personal information
- Born: October 11, 2000 (age 26); Elmwood Park, New Jersey, U.S.
- Listed height: 6 ft 3 in (1.91 m)
- Listed weight: 330 lb (150 kg)

Career information
- High school: Paramus Catholic (Paramus, New Jersey)
- College: Boston College (2019–2023)
- NFL draft: 2024: 6th round, 210th overall pick

Career history
- Detroit Lions (2024–present)

Awards and highlights
- First-team All-ACC (2023); Second-team All-ACC (2021)

Career NFL statistics as of 2025
- Games played: 18
- Games started: 12
- Stats at Pro Football Reference

Christian Joshua Mahogany (born October 11, 2000) is an American professional football guard for the Detroit Lions of the National Football League (NFL). He played college football for the Boston College Eagles, twice named to the All-Atlantic Coast Conference (ACC) team. He was selected by the Lions in the sixth round of the 2024 NFL draft.

== Early life ==
Mahogany grew up in Elmwood Park, New Jersey and attended Paramus Catholic High School. He was rated a three-star recruit and committed to play college football at Boston College.

== College career ==
Mahogany redshirted his true freshman season at Boston College in 2019. For his freshman 2020 season, he was named the Eagles' starting left guard and started all 11 of the team's games. The next year in 2021, Mahogany once again started 11 games and was named second-team All-ACC as a sophomore at right guard. Mahogany missed his 2022 junior season after he suffered a torn ACL while playing basketball during the offseason. For his senior year in 2023, Mahogany returned to start all 12 games at right guard. Through 422 pass blocking snaps, he did not give up a quarterback hit or sack. Upon the completion of his final collegiate year, Mahogany was selected first-team All-ACC honors.

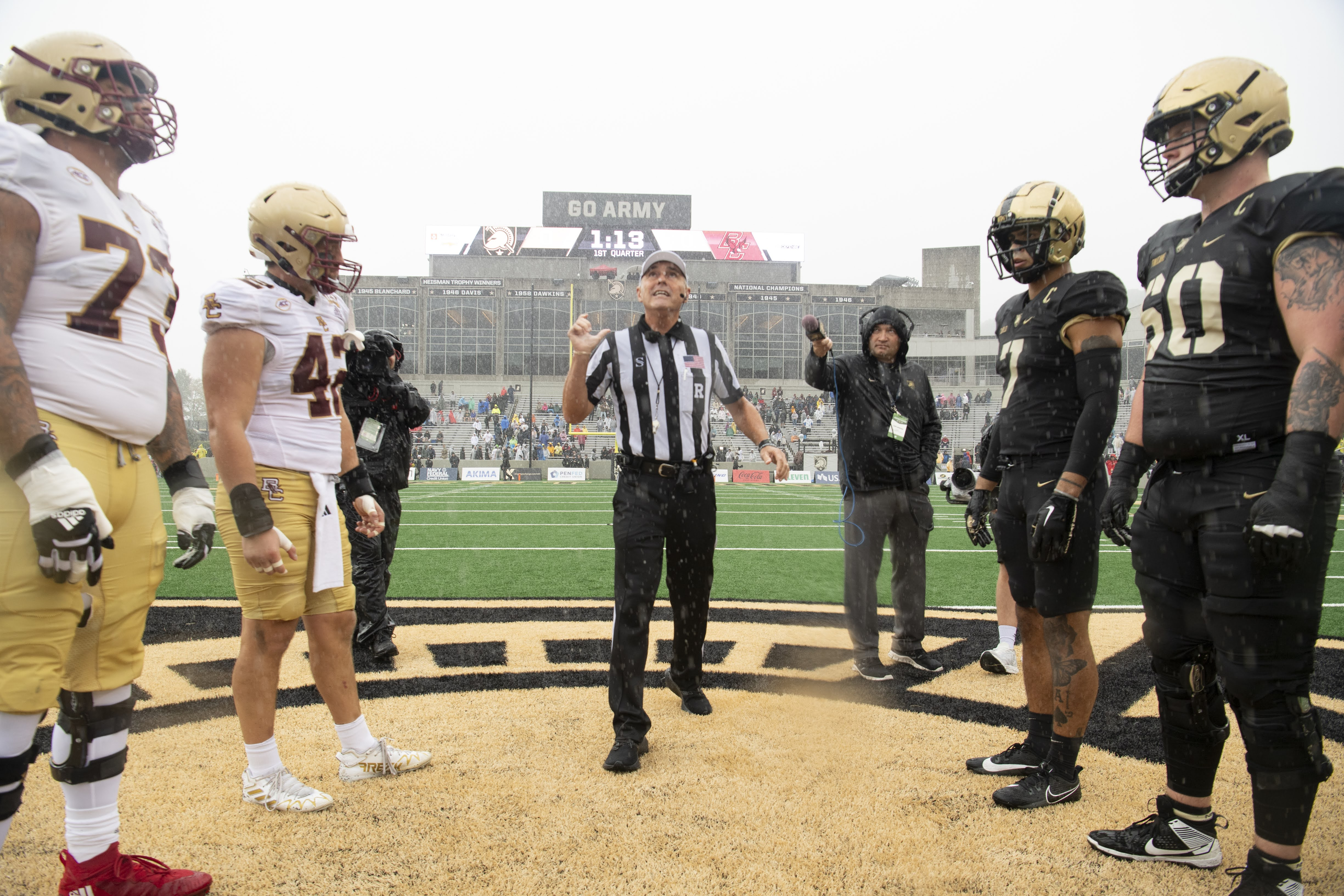
Mahogany (far left) during a coin toss vs Army in 2023

== Professional career ==
Pre-draft measurables
| Height | Weight | Arm length | Hand span | Wingspan | 40-yard dash | 10-yard split | 20-yard split | 20-yard shuttle | Three-cone drill | Vertical jump | Broad jump |
|---|---|---|---|---|---|---|---|---|---|---|---|
| 6 ft 3 3/8 in (1.91 m) | 314 lb (142 kg) | 33 1/2 in (0.85 m) | 10 1/2 in (0.27 m) | 6 ft 9 5/8 in (2.07 m) | 5.13 s | 1.74 s | 2.95 s | 4.53 s | 7.81 s | 32.5 in (0.83 m) | 9 ft 1 in (2.77 m) |
All values from NFL Combine

Mahogany was selected by the Detroit Lions in the sixth round (210th overall) of the 2024 NFL draft. He began his rookie season on the non-football injury list. Mahogany was activated on October 29.

Mahogany began the 2025 season as one of Detroit's starting guards. He suffered a broken bone in Week 9 against the Minnesota Vikings, causing him to be placed on injured reserve on November 1, 2025. Mahogany was activated on December 20, ahead of the team's Week 16 matchup against the Pittsburgh Steelers.

During the 2026 offseason, Mahogany learned that he will be competing to keep his starting role as left guard as he returns from a season-ending injury and the Lions signing of free agent left guards.
