= Marlowe Wax =

American football player (born 2002)

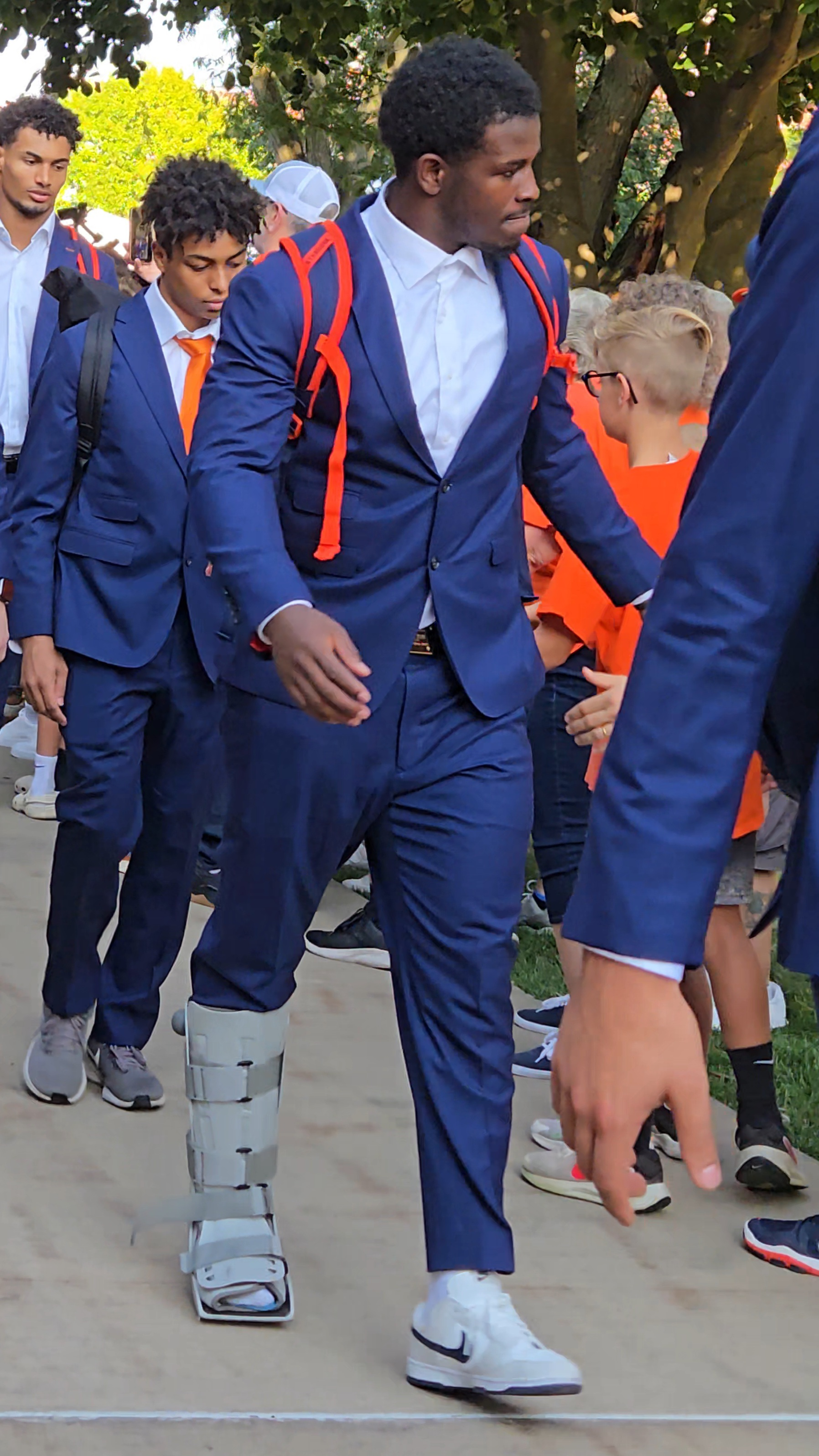
- Wax with the Syracuse Orange in 2024

No. 58 – Los Angeles Chargers
- Position: Linebacker
- Roster status: Active

Personal information
- Born: December 13, 2002 (age 23); Baltimore, Maryland, U.S.
- Listed height: 6 ft 1 in (1.85 m)
- Listed weight: 236 lb (107 kg)

Career information
- High school: Mount Saint Joseph (Baltimore, Maryland)
- College: Syracuse (2020–2024)
- NFL draft: 2025: undrafted

Career history
- Los Angeles Chargers (2025–present)

Awards and highlights
- Second-team All-ACC (2023)

Career NFL statistics as of Week 5, 2026
- Total tackles: 24
- Stats at Pro Football Reference

Marlowe Eugene Wax Jr. (born December 13, 2002) is an American professional football linebacker for the Los Angeles Chargers of the National Football League (NFL). He played college football for the Syracuse Orange.

== Early life ==
Wax attended Mount Saint Joseph High School in Baltimore, Maryland. He was rated as a three-star recruit and committed to play college football for the Syracuse Orange over other offers from schools such as Pittsburgh, Kent State, East Carolina, Marshall, Toledo, and Temple.

== College career ==
As a freshman in 2020, Wax tallied 33 tackles with five and a half being for a loss, and three sacks in 11 games. In 2021, he totaled 60 tackles with nine going for a loss, five sacks, and a forced fumble. In week 11 of the 2022 season, Wax notched 14 tackles in a 19-9 loss to Pittsburgh. During the 2022 season, he recorded 91 tackles with 10.5 going for a loss, four and a half sacks, two forced fumbles, and two fumble recoveries, earning all-ACC honorable mention. In 2023, Wax notched 110 tackles with 11.5 being for a loss, four sacks, and four forced fumbles, earning second-team all-ACC honors. In the 2024 season opener, he recorded six tackles, a sack, and a forced fumbles in a win over Ohio. In week 11, Wax recorded nine tackles a sack and a half, and the game-sealing forced fumble in a victory versus Virginia Tech. During the 2024 season, he played in just eight games due to injury and finished with 44 tackles. After the season, Wax declared for the 2025 NFL draft.

== Professional career ==
Pre-draft measurables
Height	Weight	Arm length	Hand span	Wingspan	40-yard dash	10-yard split	20-yard split	20-yard shuttle	Three-cone drill	Vertical jump	Broad jump	Bench press
6 ft 0 in (1.83 m)	227 lb (103 kg)	31 3/8 in (0.80 m)	8 3/4 in (0.22 m)	6 ft 5 1/8 in (1.96 m)	4.62 s	1.52 s	2.65 s	4.29 s	6.98 s	29.0 in (0.74 m)	9 ft 6 in (2.90 m)	23 reps
All values from Pro Day

After not being selected in the 2025 NFL draft, Wax signed with the Los Angeles Chargers as an undrafted free agent. Wax made the team's initial 53-man roster following the 2025 preseason.

== NFL career statistics ==
=== Regular season ===
Year	Team	Games		Tackles					Interceptions						Fumbles				
Year	Team	GP	GS	Cmb	Solo	Ast	Sck	TFL	Int	Yds	Avg	Lng	TD	PD	FF	Fum	FR	Yds	TD
2025	LAC	17	0	21	11	10	0.0	1	0	0	0.0	0	0	0	0	0	0	0	0
2026	LAC	5	0	3	3	0	0.0	0	0	0	0.0	0	0	0	0	0	0	0	0
Career		22	0	24	14	10	0.0	1	0	0	0.0	0	0	0	0	0	0	0	0

=== Postseason ===
Year	Team	Games		Tackles					Interceptions						Fumbles				
Year	Team	GP	GS	Cmb	Solo	Ast	Sck	TFL	Int	Yds	Avg	Lng	TD	PD	FF	Fum	FR	Yds	TD
2025	LAC	1	0	0	0	0	0.0	0	0	0	0.0	0	0	0	0	0	0	0	0
Career		1	0	0	0	0	0.0	0	0	0	0.0	0	0	0	0	0	0	0	0
