= Michael Jurgens =

American football player (born 2000)

No. 65 – Minnesota Vikings
- Position: Center
- Roster status: Active

Personal information
- Born: January 1, 2000 (age 26); Damascus, Maryland, U.S.
- Listed height: 6 ft 5 in (1.96 m)
- Listed weight: 311 lb (141 kg)

Career information
- High school: Damascus (MD)
- College: Wake Forest (2018–2023)
- NFL draft: 2024: 7th round, 230th overall pick

Career history
- Minnesota Vikings (2024–present)

Awards and highlights
- Second-team All-ACC (2023)

Career NFL statistics as of Week 10, 2026
- Games played: 22
- Games started: 3
- Stats at Pro Football Reference

Michael Jurgens (born January 1, 2000) is an American professional football center for the Minnesota Vikings of the National Football League (NFL). He played college football for the Wake Forest Demon Deacons and was selected by the Vikings in the seventh round of the 2024 NFL draft.

== Early life and college ==
Jurgens was born on January 1, 2000, and grew up in Damascus, Maryland. He attended Damascus High School where he was team captain and was a top offensive lineman, helping the team go 42–0 in his career. He was named first-team All-Met, All-State, and the team offensive lineman of the year as a junior, and then was first-team All-Met and the MCPS Coaches 3A-2A Player of the Year as a senior. He played at the Maryland Crab Bowl all-star game and set Damascus records for single-game, season and career pancake blocks. He committed to play college football for the Wake Forest Demon Deacons as a three-star recruit.

Jurgens redshirted as a true freshman at Wake Forest in 2018 while appearing in two games. He then played 13 games in 2019, and started eight games in 2020 while playing center. In 2021, he started all 13 games at center and helped them to 11 wins which included a Gator Bowl victory, earning honorable mention All-Atlantic Coast Conference (ACC) honors. He again started all 13 games in 2022 and repeated as an honorable mention All-ACC selection. He opted to return for a final season in 2023. He was team captain and was chosen second-team All-ACC in his last year.

== Professional career ==
Pre-draft measurables
Height	Weight	Arm length	Hand span	Wingspan	40-yard dash	10-yard split	20-yard split	20-yard shuttle	Three-cone drill	Vertical jump	Broad jump	Bench press
6 ft 4 3/4 in (1.95 m)	307 lb (139 kg)	32 in (0.81 m)	9 3/8 in (0.24 m)	6 ft 5 in (1.96 m)	5.43 s	1.80 s	3.09 s	4.80 s	7.50 s	32 in (0.81 m)	8 ft 11 in (2.72 m)	22 reps
All values from Pro Day

Jurgens was selected by the Minnesota Vikings in the seventh round (230th overall) of the 2024 NFL draft.

On August 30, 2026, Jurgens was placed on the Vikings injured reserve list/designated for return during final roster cuts. On October 10, he was activated from the injured reserve list.
