= Will Putnam =

American football player (born 2000)

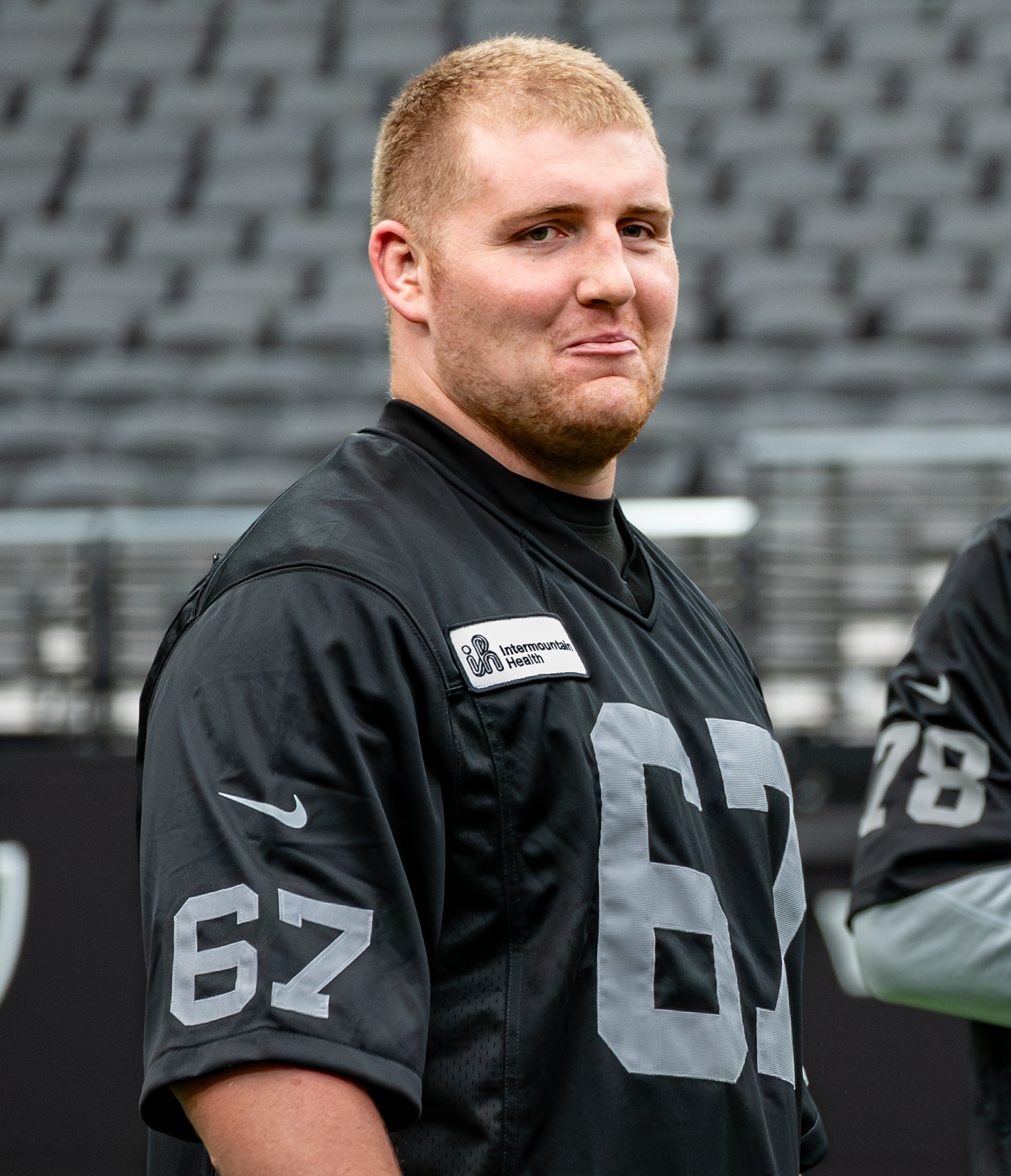
- Putnam with the Las Vegas Raiders in 2024

No. 67 – Las Vegas Raiders
- Position: Center
- Roster status: Practice squad

Personal information
- Born: August 13, 2000 (age 26); Detroit, Michigan, U.S.
- Listed height: 6 ft 4 in (1.93 m)
- Listed weight: 301 lb (137 kg)

Career information
- High school: Plant (Tampa, Florida)
- College: Clemson (2019–2023)
- NFL draft: 2024: undrafted

Career history
- Las Vegas Raiders (2024–present)

Awards and highlights
- 2x Third-team All-ACC (2022–2023)

Career NFL statistics as of 2025
- Games played: 15
- Games started: 2
- Stats at Pro Football Reference

William Putnam (born August 13, 2000) is an American professional football center for the Las Vegas Raiders of the National Football League (NFL). He played college football for the Clemson Tigers.

== Early life ==
Putnam grew up in Chatham, Illinois and attended Glenwood High School before transferring to Henry B. Plant High School during his junior year due to his father being with the U.S. Army as well as his job. He was selected to the 2019 All-American Bowl. He was a four-star rated recruit and committed to play college football at Clemson University over offers from Florida State, Auburn, Miami (FL), Michigan and Penn State.

== College career ==
During Putnam's true freshman season in 2019, he played in 11 games, finishing the season with 192 snaps. During the 2020 season, he played in and started all 12 games, finishing the season with 790 snaps and a tackle leading the ACC as the only ream to allow fewer than two sacks per game. During the 2021 season, he played in and started 10 games, finishing the season with 633 offensive snaps and was a third-team all-conference pick by Phil Steele. During the 2022 season, he played in and started all 14 games as a first-year center. He finished the season with 996 offensive snaps which was the fourth-most in a season at center in Clemson history. He was also a third-team All-ACC selection. During the 2023 season, he played in and started all 13 games as a permanent team captain, finishing the season with 953 offensive snaps and as a third-team All-ACC selection.

== Professional career ==
Pre-draft measurables
Height	Weight	Arm length	Hand span	Wingspan	40-yard dash	10-yard split	20-yard split	20-yard shuttle	Three-cone drill	Vertical jump	Broad jump	Bench press
6 ft 4 1/2 in (1.94 m)	301 lb (137 kg)	31 in (0.79 m)	9 3/8 in (0.24 m)	6 ft 3 1/2 in (1.92 m)	5.48 s	1.81 s	3.15 s	4.69 s	7.85 s	24.0 in (0.61 m)	8 ft 4 in (2.54 m)	28 reps
All values from Pro Day

Putnam signed with the Las Vegas Raiders as an undrafted free agent on April 27, 2024. He was waived on August 27, and re-signed to the practice squad. Putnam signed a reserve/future contract with Las Vegas on January 6, 2025.

On April 6, 2026, Putnam re-signed with the Raiders. Putnam was waived by the Raiders as a part of final roster cuts on August 30; he was re-signed to the team's practice squad.

== Personal life ==
Putnam is the grandson of former Lafayette head coach, Neil Putnam.
