= Aydan White =

American football player (born 2002)

Profile
- Position: Cornerback

Personal information
- Born: February 12, 2002 (age 24); Asheville, North Carolina, U.S.
- Listed height: 6 ft 0 in (1.83 m)
- Listed weight: 183 lb (83 kg)

Career information
- High school: Christ School (Arden, North Carolina)
- College: NC State (2020–2024)
- NFL draft: 2025: undrafted

Career history
- Jacksonville Jaguars (2025)*
- * Offseason or practice squad member only

Awards and highlights
- First-team All-ACC (2022); Third-team All-ACC (2023)
- Stats at Pro Football Reference

Aydan White (born February 12, 2002) is an American professional football cornerback. He played college football for the NC State Wolfpack.

== Early life ==
White was born in Asheville, North Carolina. White attended Christ School, a private boarding school in Arden, North Carolina. White played both receiver and corner in high school, recording 60 catches for over 1,000 yards as a junior but was primarily recruited as a corner. In addition to playing football, White also ran track, winning three state titles in the 110-meter hurdles. A 3 star prospect, he committed to play college football at North Carolina State University over offers from ECU and Wake Forest.

== College career ==
As a freshman in 2020, White was originally meant to redshirt in order to put additional muscle on his frame but would end up playing following injuries in the teams secondary. In his second game receiving playing time he would record a key interception in the 4th quarter of the Wolfpack's 15–14 win over Liberty and was named the ACC Rookie of the Week. White would make his first two starts in 2021, but suffered from inconsistent play, and would later call his 2021 campaign "eye opening". Entering the 2022 season, White would miss spring practice with a torn labrum, but would heal prior to the start of the season. White would emerge as a star in 2022, recording 46 tackles and 4 interceptions. On September 18, 2022, he was named the Walter Camp Defensive Player of the Week following a two interception, one pick-six performance against Texas Tech. At the conclusion of the season, White was named a member of the All-ACC first team.

On January 2, 2024, White announced that he would be entering the transfer portal. On January 11, he announced that he had withdrawn from the transfer portal and would return to NC State for his final year of eligibility.

== Professional career ==
Pre-draft measurables
Height	Weight	Arm length	Hand span
5 ft 11 3/4 in (1.82 m)	183 lb (83 kg)	31 1/4 in (0.79 m)	9 in (0.23 m)
All values from Pro Day

On April 27, 2025, White signed with the Jacksonville Jaguars as an undrafted free agent. He was waived on August 26 as part of final roster cuts.
