= MJ Devonshire =

American football player (born 2000)

Dallas Renegades
- Position: Cornerback
- Roster status: Unsigned draft pick

Personal information
- Born: September 12, 2000 (age 26); Aliquippa, Pennsylvania, U.S.
- Listed height: 5 ft 11 in (1.80 m)
- Listed weight: 186 lb (84 kg)

Career information
- High school: Aliquippa
- College: Kentucky (2019–2020); Pittsburgh (2021–2023)
- NFL draft: 2024: 7th round, 229th overall pick

Career history
- Las Vegas Raiders (2024)*; Carolina Panthers (2025)*; Baltimore Ravens (2025)*; Buffalo Bills (2025)*; Green Bay Packers (2026)*; Dallas Renegades (2027-present)
- * Offseason or practice squad member only

Awards and highlights
- 2× Second-team All-ACC (2022, 2023)
- Stats at Pro Football Reference

Marlin "MJ" Devonshire Jr. (born September 12, 2000) is an American professional football cornerback. He played college football for the Kentucky Wildcats and the Pittsburgh Panthers and was selected by the Las Vegas Raiders in the seventh round of the 2024 NFL draft.

== Early life ==
Devonshire was born in Aliquippa, Pennsylvania where he attended high school at Aliquippa. In his senior season, Devonshire recorded eight interceptions, and eight punt return touchdowns. Devonshire would decide to commit to play college football at the University of Kentucky.

== College career ==
=== Kentucky ===
In Devonshire's first season in 2019 he totaled five tackles with one pass deflection. In the 2020 season, Devonshire had one tackle and a pass deflection. After the conclusion of the 2020 season, Devonshire would decide to enter the NCAA transfer portal.

=== Pittsburgh ===
Devonshire would decide to transfer to the University of Pittsburgh to continue out his college career. In week eleven of the 2021 season, Devonshire recorded his first career interception that sealed the win for the Panthers over North Carolina. Devonshire finished the 2021 season with 17 tackles, with one being for a loss, three pass deflections, and an interception. In week one of the 2022 season, Devonshire intercepted a pass and returned it for 56 yards to take the lead, as he helped Pittsburgh beat their rival West Virginia. For his performance on the week, Devonshire was named the ACC defensive back of the week. In week four, Devonshire returned a punt 82 yards for a touchdowns, in a win over Rhode Island. Devonshire finished the 2022 season with 34 tackles, eight pass deflections, three interceptions, and two touchdowns, Devonshire also returned 24 punts for 233 yards and a touchdown. For his performance on the year, Devonshire was named second team All-ACC as a returner. Devonshire entered the 2023 season, as one of the Panthers best players. In week seven of the 2023 season, Devonshire totaled six tackles, five pass deflections, and he intercepted a pass and returned it 86 yards for a touchdown, as he helped Pittsburgh upset #14 Louisville. For his performance on the week he was named the ACC defensive back of the week.

== Professional career ==
Pre-draft measurables
Height	Weight	Arm length	Hand span	Wingspan	40-yard dash	10-yard split	20-yard split	20-yard shuttle	Three-cone drill	Vertical jump	Broad jump	Bench press
5 ft 10 3/4 in (1.80 m)	186 lb (84 kg)	32 7/8 in (0.84 m)	8 3/4 in (0.22 m)	6 ft 6 3/4 in (2.00 m)	4.45 s	1.54 s	2.59 s	4.31 s	7.00 s	38.5 in (0.98 m)	10 ft 4 in (3.15 m)	10 reps
All values from NFL Combine/Pro Day

=== Las Vegas Raiders ===
Devonshire was selected by the Las Vegas Raiders in the seventh round (229th overall) of the 2024 NFL draft. He was waived on August 28, and re-signed to the practice squad.

Devonshire signed a reserve/future contract with Las Vegas on January 6, 2025. On April 25, Devonshire was waived by the Raiders.

=== Carolina Panthers ===
On April 28, 2025, Devonshire was claimed off waivers by the Carolina Panthers. He was waived on July 25.

=== Baltimore Ravens ===
On August 9, 2025, Devonshire signed with the Baltimore Ravens. He was waived by the Ravens on August 25.

=== Buffalo Bills ===
On December 9, 2025, Devonshire signed with the Buffalo Bills' practice squad. On January 19, 2026, he signed a reserve/futures contract with Buffalo. On May 11, Devonshire was waived by the Bills.

=== Green Bay Packers ===
On May 13, 2026, Devonshire was claimed off waivers by the Green Bay Packers. On August 30, he was released by the Packers as a part of final roster cuts.
