= Graham Barton =

American football player (born 2002)

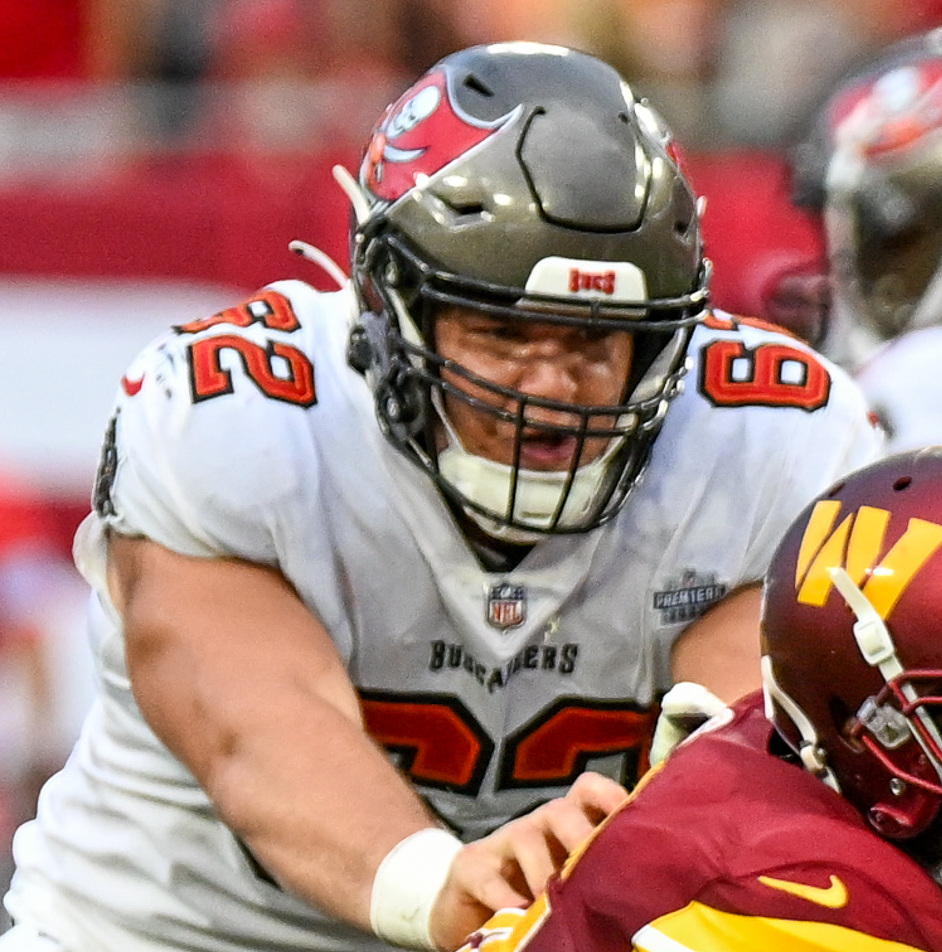
- Barton with the Tampa Bay Buccaneers in 2024

No. 62 – Tampa Bay Buccaneers
- Position: Center
- Roster status: Active

Personal information
- Born: June 1, 2002 (age 24); Brentwood, Tennessee, U.S.
- Listed height: 6 ft 5 in (1.96 m)
- Listed weight: 314 lb (142 kg)

Career information
- High school: Ravenwood (Brentwood)
- College: Duke (2020–2023)
- NFL draft: 2024: 1st round, 26th overall pick

Career history
- Tampa Bay Buccaneers (2024–present)

Awards and highlights
- Second-team All-American (2023); 2× first-team All-ACC (2022, 2023)

Career NFL statistics as of Week 4, 2026
- Games played: 37
- Games started: 37
- Fumble recoveries: 1
- Stats at Pro Football Reference

Graham Barton (born June 1, 2002) is an American professional football center for the Tampa Bay Buccaneers of the National Football League (NFL). He played college football for the Duke Blue Devils, earning all-conference honors in 2022 and 2023, and All-American honors in the latter year. Barton was selected by the Buccaneers in the first round of the 2024 NFL draft.

== Early life ==
Barton was born on June 1, 2002, in Brentwood, Tennessee, and attended Ravenwood High School. His parents are Philip and Heather Barton. Graham also has one sibling, Anna Barton. Considered a three-star recruit by the 247Sports rankings, Barton was listed as the No. 14 offensive guard in 2020, and the No. 10 prospect in the state of Tennessee. He committed to play college football at Duke over offers from Michigan State and Vanderbilt.

== College career ==
Barton first saw playing time during his freshman season at Duke after both the first and second string centers suffered season-ending injuries. He started the Blue Devils' final five games of the season and was named a second team Freshman All-America by The Athletic. Barton was named Duke's starting left tackle entering his sophomore season. He was named first-team All-Atlantic Coast Conference (ACC) as a junior.

== Professional career ==
Pre-draft measurables
Height	Weight	Arm length	Hand span	Wingspan	40-yard dash	10-yard split	20-yard split	20-yard shuttle	Three-cone drill
6 ft 5 3/8 in (1.97 m)	313 lb (142 kg)	32 7/8 in (0.84 m)	9 3/8 in (0.24 m)	6 ft 7 3/4 in (2.03 m)	4.97 s	1.68 s	2.82 s	4.55 s	7.31 s
All values from NFL Combine/Pro Day

The Tampa Bay Buccaneers selected Barton in the first round (26th overall) of the 2024 NFL draft. He was the first center drafted in 2024 and was the seventh offensive lineman.

On June 23, 2024, the Tampa Bay Buccaneers signed Barton to a four-year, $14.02 million contract that's fully guaranteed at signing with a signing bonus of $7.02 million.

Throughout training camp, Barton competed to be the starting center against fourth-year veteran Robert Hainsey, who was the starter the previous season. Head coach Todd Bowles named Barton the starting center to begin the season.
