= Chico Bennett Jr. =

American gridiron football player (born 2001)

Profile
- Position: Defensive end

Personal information
- Born: June 15, 2001 (age 25); Killeen, Texas, U.S.
- Listed height: 6 ft 4 in (1.93 m)
- Listed weight: 256 lb (116 kg)

Career information
- High school: Rock Ridge (Ashburn, Virginia); Battle Ground (Franklin, Tennessee)
- College: Georgia Tech (2019–2020); Virginia (2022–2024)
- NFL draft: 2025: undrafted

Career history
- Saskatchewan Roughriders (2025)

Awards and highlights
- Grey Cup champion (2025)

Career CFL statistics as of 2025
- Total tackles: 2
- Stats at CFL.ca

Chico Bennett Jr. (born June 15, 2001) is an American professional football defensive end. He played college football for the Georgia Tech Yellow Jackets and the Virginia Cavaliers.

== College career ==
Bennett played college football for the Georgia Tech Yellow Jackets from 2019 to 2020 and the Virginia Cavaliers from 2022 to 2024. In two seasons at Georgia Tech, he played in 15 games, recording 31 tackles, including two tackles for loss, and 0.5 sack. On December 14, 2020, Bennett announced he would enter the transfer portal, eventually landing at the University of Virginia.

After not playing in the 2021 season, he earned an All-ACC honorable mention behind 34 tackles, including 7.5 tackles for loss, seven sacks, one fumble recovery and two forced fumbles in ten games in 2022. Bennett appeared in 11 games in 2023, registering 34 tackles with 4.5 tackles for loss. In his final season, he played in 12 games, making 39 tackles, including 7.5 tackles for loss, one sack, one fumble recovery, one forced fumble and his first interception, against Boston College.

== Professional career ==
Pre-draft measurables
Height	Weight	Arm length	Hand span	40-yard dash	10-yard split	20-yard split	20-yard shuttle	Three-cone drill	Vertical jump	Broad jump	Bench press
6 ft 4 in (1.93 m)	249 lb (113 kg)	33 1/2 in (0.85 m)	9 3/8 in (0.24 m)	4.76 s	1.62 s	2.66 s	4.38 s	7.14 s	33 in (0.84 m)	9 ft 6 in (2.90 m)	20 reps
All values from Pro Day

Bennett attended the Philadelphia Eagles’ rookie mini-camp, before signing with the Saskatchewan Roughriders of the Canadian Football League (CFL) on September 22, 2025. He played in the final two games of the 2025 season, recording one tackle in each contest.

On May 30, 2026, Bennett was released by the Roughriders as part of final roster cuts.
