= Matt Goncalves =

American football player (born 2001)

No. 71 – Indianapolis Colts
- Position: Guard
- Roster status: Active

Personal information
- Born: January 26, 2001 (age 25); Manorville, New York, U.S.
- Listed height: 6 ft 6 in (1.98 m)
- Listed weight: 317 lb (144 kg)

Career information
- High school: Eastport-South Manor (Manorville)
- College: Pittsburgh (2019–2023)
- NFL draft: 2024: 3rd round, 79th overall pick

Career history
- Indianapolis Colts (2024–present)

Awards and highlights
- Third-team All-ACC (2022)
- Stats at Pro Football Reference

Matthew Dylan Goncalves (Pronounced: Gone-SAL-ves; born January 26, 2001) is an American professional football guard for the Indianapolis Colts of the National Football League (NFL). He played college football for the Pittsburgh Panthers and was selected by the Colts in the third round of the 2024 NFL draft.

== Early life ==
Goncalves grew up in Manorville, New York, where he attended Eastport-South Manor High School.

Just two games into his 2017 junior season, he suffered a season-ending knee injury. "The injury was devastating, worst thing in my life," Goncalves recalled. "I gained some weight and hit the weight room to get stronger. And the hard work paid off."

After rehabbing his injury, Goncalves returned to form, emerging as a top player, regarded as both a "road grader"-type run-blocker from the left tackle position but also demonstrating pass blocking skill as part of a line that did not give up a single sack in the final six games of his senior year. He was named a first-team All-Long Island selection for 2018.

Goncalves played both offensively and defensively in high school was regarded the consensus top offensive line prospect in New York state, committing to play college football for the Pittsburgh Panthers.

== College career ==
Goncalves redshirted as a true freshman in 2019 at Pittsburgh. He played nine games, three as a starter, in 2020, performing well enough to earn honors as a Freshman All-American.

He played 13 games with five starts in 2021. He started all 13 games in 2022, five at left tackle and eight at right tackle. Entering the 2023 season, Goncalves was the only Pittsburgh player on the preseason All-Atlantic Coast Conference (ACC) team.

Three games into his senior year, he suffered a season-ending lower body injury, effectively ending his college career.

== Professional career ==
Pre-draft measurables
Height	Weight	Arm length	Hand span	Wingspan	40-yard dash	10-yard split	20-yard split	20-yard shuttle	Vertical jump	Bench press
6 ft 6 1/4 in (1.99 m)	327 lb (148 kg)	33 1/4 in (0.84 m)	9 in (0.23 m)	6 ft 9 1/4 in (2.06 m)	5.22 s	1.79 s	2.99 s	4.89 s	30.5 in (0.77 m)	19 reps
All values from NFL Combine/Pro Day

Goncalves was selected by the Indianapolis Colts with the 79th overall pick in the third round of the 2024 NFL draft.

According to Colts area scout Chad Henry, Goncalves was attractive to the Colts for his physical skills, intelligence, and consistency. Henry told the Indianapolis Star: "It's pretty easy to identify what he is when you watch him on film. He's pretty consistent every game.... If I'm giving this guy a nickname, it'd The Blueprint because he is the pure, exact blueprint of what we want in an offensive lineman. I don't know that there was an offensive lineman who was on the board who fits our room better than this guy: big, smart, tough, strong, mean, high give-a-(expletive) factor, versatile, dependable, really cares."

Prior to the 2025 season, Goncalves was shifted to the guard position following the departure of Will Fries in free agency.
