= 2023 Pop-Tarts Bowl =

American college football game

- 34th Pop-Tarts Bowl
NC State Wolfpack	Kansas State Wildcats
(9–3)	(8–4)
ACC	Big 12
19	28
Head coach: Dave Doeren	Head coach: Chris Klieman
AP / Coaches / CFP; 19 / 18 / 18	AP / Coaches / CFP; NR / NR / 25
	1	2	3	4	Total
NC State	0	10	9	0	19
Kansas State	7	14	0	7	28
- Date: December 28, 2023
- Season: 2023
- Stadium: Camping World Stadium
- Location: Orlando, Florida
- MVP: Avery Johnson (QB, Kansas State)
- Favorite: Kansas State by 3.5
- Referee: Larry Smith (Big 10)
- Attendance: 31,111

United States TV coverage
- Network: ESPN; ESPN Radio
- Announcers: Anish Shroff (play-by-play), Andre Ware (analyst), and Paul Carcaterra (sideline) (ESPN); Sean Kelley (play-by-play) and Rene Ingoglia (analyst) (ESPN Radio)

The 2023 Pop-Tarts Bowl was a college football bowl game played on December 28, 2023, at Camping World Stadium in Orlando, Florida. The 34th annual Pop-Tarts Bowl (although the first under that name) featured NC State from the Atlantic Coast Conference (ACC) and Kansas State from the Big 12 Conference. The bowl was ranked 9th in the fbs, the game began at approximately 5:45 p.m. EST and was aired on ESPN. The Pop-Tarts Bowl was one of the 2023–24 bowl games concluding the 2023 FBS football season. The bowl game's title sponsor was Kellanova through their Pop-Tarts brand.

== Teams ==
Consistent with conference tie-ins, the bowl featured the NC State Wolfpack of the Atlantic Coast Conference (ACC) against the Kansas State Wildcats of the Big 12 Conference.

This was the first time that NC State and Kansas State played each other.

=== NC State Wolfpack ===
The Wolfpack entered the game with a 9–3 record (6–2 in the ACC), having finished in third place in the conference and 18th in the College Football Playoff rankings.

This was NC State's sixth Pop-Tarts Bowl, tying Miami (FL) for the most appearances in the game. The Wolfpack had a 3–2 record in prior editions of the game, most recently appearing in the 2010 Champs Sports Bowl (when the bowl was played under that name), which they won.

=== Kansas State Wildcats ===
The Wildcats entered the game with an 8–4 record (6–3 in the Big 12), tied for fourth place in their conference and 25th in the College Football Playoff rankings.

This was Kansas State's first Pop-Tarts Bowl.

== Game summary ==
2023 Pop-Tarts Bowl

Quarter	1	2	3	4	Total
No. 18 NC State	0	10	9	0	19
No. 25 Kansas State	7	14	0	7	28

at Camping World Stadium • Orlando, Florida

- Date: Thursday, December 28, 2023
- Game time: 5:45 p.m. EST
- Game weather: Cloudy • Temperature: 61 °F (16 °C) • Wind: 7 mph (11 km/h) W
- Game attendance: 31,111
- Referee: Larry Smith
- TV announcers (ESPN): Anish Shroff (play-by-play), Andre Ware (analyst), and Paul Carcaterra (sideline)
- Box score

Game information

First Quarter

- (12:35) KSU – DJ Giddens 37 yard pass from Avery Johnson, Chris Tennant kick (Drive: 6 plays, 75 yards, 2:25; Kansas State 7–0)

Second Quarter

- (7:29) KSU – DJ Giddens 4 yard run, Chris Tennant kick (Drive: 9 plays, 90 yards, 4:49; Kansas State 14–0)
- (3:22) NCSU – Brennan Armstrong 31 yard run, Brayden Narveson kick (Drive: 9 plays, 76 yards, 4:07; Kansas State 14–7)
- (0:55) KSU – Avery Johnson 19 yard run, Chris Tennant kick (Drive: 10 plays, 75 yards, 2:27; Kansas State 21–7)
- (0:00) NCSU – Brayden Narveson 26 yard field goal (Drive: 8 plays, 57 yards, 0:00; Kansas State 21–10)

Third Quarter

- (12:51) NCSU – Brayden Narveson 49 yard field goal (Drive: 6 plays, 44 yards, 2:09; Kansas State 21–13)
- (1:50) NCSU – Trent Pennix 60 yard run, two point pass conversion failed (Drive: 7 plays, 75 yards, 4:03; Kansas State 21–19)

Fourth Quarter

- (2:48) KSU – Jayce Brown 11 yard pass from Avery Johnson, Chris Tennant kick (Drive: 15 plays, 72 yards, 7:24; Kansas State 28–19)

=== Statistics ===
Statistics	NCSU	KSU
First downs	17	22
Plays–yards	62–399	71–435
Rushes–yards	33–235	40–257
Passing yards	164	178
Passing: comp–att–int	14–29–1	14–31–0
Time of possession	29:06	30:54

Team	Category	Player	Statistics
NC State	Passing	Brennan Armstrong	14/28, 164 yards, INT
NC State	Rushing	Brennan Armstrong	17 carries, 121 yards, TD
NC State	Receiving	Kevin Concepcion	7 catches, 72 yards
Kansas State	Passing	Avery Johnson	14/31, 178 yards, 2 TD
Kansas State	Rushing	DJ Giddens	28 carries, 151 yards, TD
Kansas State	Receiving	Jayce Brown	5 catches, 52 yards, TD
