= 2023 Kansas State Wildcats football team =

American college football season

2023 Kansas State Wildcats football

Pop-Tarts Bowl champion

Pop-Tarts Bowl, W 28–19 vs. NC State
- Conference: Big 12 Conference

Ranking
- Coaches: No. 19
- AP: No. 18
- Record: 9–4 (6–3 Big 12)
- Head coach: Chris Klieman (5th season)
- Offensive coordinator: Collin Klein (2nd season)
- Offensive scheme: Pro spread
- Defensive coordinator: Joe Klanderman (4th season)
- Base defense: 3–3–5
- Home stadium: Bill Snyder Family Football Stadium

Uniform
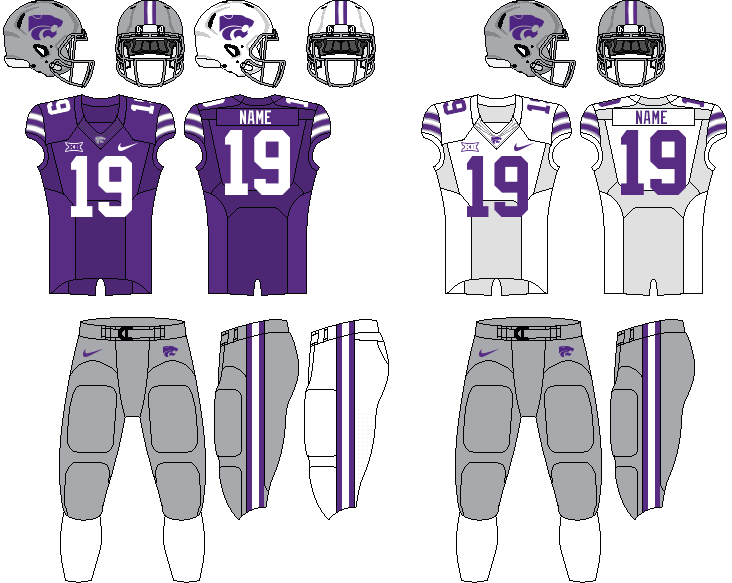

2023 Big 12 Conference football standings
	Conf.			Overall
Team	W		L	W		L
No. 3 Texas y$^	8	–	1	12	–	2
No. 16 Oklahoma State y	7	–	2	10	–	4
No. 15 Oklahoma	7	–	2	10	–	3
Iowa State	6	–	3	7	–	6
No. 18 Kansas State	6	–	3	9	–	4
West Virginia	6	–	3	9	–	4
Texas Tech	5	–	4	7	–	6
No. 23 Kansas	5	–	4	9	–	4
UCF	3	–	6	6	–	7
TCU	3	–	6	5	–	7
Houston	2	–	7	4	–	8
BYU	2	–	7	5	–	7
Baylor	2	–	7	3	–	9
Cincinnati	1	–	8	3	–	9
Championship: Texas 49, Oklahoma State 21
^ – College Football Playoff participant; $ – Conference champion; y – Championship game participant; Rankings from AP Poll

The 2023 Kansas State Wildcats football team represented Kansas State University in the Big 12 Conference during the 2023 NCAA Division I FBS football season. The Wildcats were led by Chris Klieman in his fifth year as their head coach. They played their home games at Bill Snyder Family Football Stadium in Manhattan, Kansas.

== Pre-season ==
=== Big 12 preseason poll ===
The Big 12 preseason poll was released on July 6. Kansas State was picked 2nd in the conference.

First place votes in parentheses.

Big 12 media poll
Predicted finish	Team	Points
1	Texas (41)	886
2	Kansas State (14)	858
3	Oklahoma (4)	758
4	Texas Tech (4)	729
5	TCU (3)	727
6	Baylor	572
7	Oklahoma State (1)	470
8	UCF	463
9	Kansas	461
10	Iowa State	334
11	BYU	318
12	Houston	215
13	Cincinnati	202
14	West Virginia	129

== Schedule ==
Date	Time	Opponent	Rank	Site	TV	Result	Attendance
September 2	6:00 p.m.	No. 12 (FCS) Southeast Missouri State*	No. 16	Bill Snyder Family Football Stadium; Manhattan, KS	ESPN+	W 45–0	52,066
September 9	11:00 a.m.	Troy*	No. 15	Bill Snyder Family Football Stadium; Manhattan, KS	FS1	W 42–13	51,940
September 16	11:00 a.m.	at Missouri*	No. 15	Faurot Field; Columbia, MO	SECN	L 27–30	62,621
September 23	7:00 p.m.	UCF		Bill Snyder Family Football Stadium; Manhattan, KS	FS1	W 44–31	51,912
October 6	6:30 p.m.	at Oklahoma State		Boone Pickens Stadium; Stillwater, OK	ESPN	L 21–29	53,855
October 14	6:00 p.m.	at Texas Tech		Jones AT&T Stadium; Lubbock, TX	FS1	W 38–21	56,200
October 21	6:00 p.m.	TCU		Bill Snyder Family Football Stadium; Manhattan, KS	ESPN2	W 41–3	52,580
October 28	11:00 a.m.	Houston^{†}		Bill Snyder Family Football Stadium; Manhattan, KS	ESPN2	W 41–0	51,928
November 4	11:00 a.m.	at No. 7 Texas	No. 23	Darrell K Royal–Texas Memorial Stadium; Austin, TX (Big Noon Kickoff)	FOX	L 30–33 ^{OT}	102,846
November 11	2:00 p.m.	Baylor	No. 25	Bill Snyder Family Football Stadium; Manhattan, KS	ESPN+	W 59–25	51,790
November 18	6:00 p.m.	at No. 25 Kansas	No. 21	David Booth Kansas Memorial Stadium; Lawrence, KS (Sunflower Showdown)	FS1	W 31–27	47,233
November 25	7:00 p.m.	Iowa State	No. 19	Bill Snyder Family Football Stadium; Manhattan, KS (rivalry)	FOX	L 35–42	51,481
December 28	4:45 p.m.	vs. No. 18 NC State*	No. 25	Camping World Stadium; Orlando, FL (Pop-Tarts Bowl)	ESPN	W 28–19	31,111
*Non-conference game; ^{†}Homecoming; Rankings from AP Poll (and CFP Rankings, after October 31) - Released prior to game; All times are in Central time

== Game summaries ==
=== Southeast Missouri State ===
Game One – No. 12 (FCS) Southeast Missouri State at No. 16 Kansas State Wildcats

Quarter	1	2	3	4	Total
No. 12 (FCS) Redhawks	0	0	0	0	0
No. 16 Wildcats	7	28	3	7	45

at Bill Snyder Family Stadium • Manhattan, Kansas

- Date: Saturday, September 2, 2023
- Game time: 6:00 p.m. CDT
- Game weather: • Temperature: 100 degrees, sunny, wind S at 9 mph
- Game attendance: 52,066
- Referee: Henry Johnson
- TV announcers (ESPN+): Mark Neely (play-by-play), Adam Breneman (analyst), and Tori Petry (sidelines)
- Sources: K-State Box Score K-State Recap

Statistics	Southeast Missouri State	Kansas State
First downs	13	28
Total yards	227	588
Rushes/yards	26/6	40/228
Passing yards	221	360
Passing: Comp–Att–Int	25–37–0	22–31–1
Turnovers	0	1
Time of possession	30:35	29:25
Penalties–yards	5−65	4−36

Team	Category	Player	Statistics
Southeast Missouri State	Passing	Paxton DeLaurent	24/36, 213 YDS
Southeast Missouri State	Rushing	Darrell Smith	6 CAR, 18 YDS, 11 Long
Southeast Missouri State	Receiving	Ryan Flournoy	10 REC, 96 YDS, 24 Long
Kansas State	Passing	Will Howard	18/26, 297 YDS, 2 TDS, 1 INT
Kansas State	Rushing	DJ Giddens	15 CAR, 128 YDS, 43 Long
Kansas State	Receiving	RJ Garcia II	5 REC, 119 YDS, 1 TD, 44 Long

Scoring summary

Quarter	Time	Drive			Team	Scoring information	Score	
Quarter	Time	Plays	Yards	TOP	Team	Scoring information	SEMO	KSU
1st	9:33	9	67	4:03	KSU	Jadon Jackson 33-yard touchdown reception from Will Howard, Chris Tennant kick good	0	7
2nd	11:57	13	84	5:45	KSU	Will Howard 1-yard touchdown run, Chris Tennant kick good	0	14
2nd	8:13	6	87	2:16	KSU	RJ Garcia II 37-yard touchdown reception from Will Howard, Chris Tennant kick good	0	21
2nd	5:35	4	60	1:42	KSU	Treshaun Ward 3-yard touchdown run, Chris Tennant kick good	0	28
2nd	0:38	9	89	1:36	KSU	Will Howard 8-yard touchdown reception from Treshaun Ward, Chris Tennant kick good	0	35
3rd	12:17	7	34	2:37	KSU	51-yard field goal by Chris Tennant	0	38
4th	14:30	8	79	3:42	KSU	Avery Johnson 7-yard touchdown run, Leyton Simmering kick good	0	45
"TOP" = time of possession. For other American football terms, see Glossary of American football.							SEMO 0	KSU 45

=== Troy ===
Team	1	2	3	4	Total
Troy	0	10	0	3	13
• No. 15 Kansas State	7	14	7	14	42

- Date: September 9
- Location: Bill Snyder Family Football Stadium, (Manhattan, KS)
- Game start: 11:00 a.m. CDT
- Game attendance: 51,940
- Game weather: 77 degrees, sunny, wind SE at 1 mph
- Referee: Stephen Baron
- TV announcers (FS1): Eric Collins (play-by-play) and Devin Gardner (analyst)
- Sources: K-State Box Score K-State Recap

Statistics	Troy	Kansas State
First downs	15	20
Total yards	286	397
Rushes/yards	28/70	38/147
Passing yards	216	250
Passing: Comp–Att–Int	22–38–1	21–32–1
Turnovers	2	1
Time of possession	30:23	29:37
Penalties–yards	3–22	5–45

Team	Category	Player	Statistics
Troy	Passing	Gunnar Watson	17/32 167 YDS, 1 TD, 1 INT
Troy	Rushing	Kimani Vidal	17 CAR, 83 YDS, 46 Long
Troy	Receiving	Chris Lewis	5 REC, 50 YDS, 1 TD, 21 Long
Kansas State	Passing	Will Howard	21/32 250 YDS, 3 TD, 1 INT
Kansas State	Rushing	Treshaun Ward	16 CAR, 58 YDS, 20 Long
Kansas State	Receiving	Phillip Brooks	7 REC, 94 YDS, 1 TD, 39 Long

Scoring summary

Quarter	Time	Drive			Team	Scoring information	Score	
Quarter	Time	Plays	Yards	TOP	Team	Scoring information	TROY	KSU
1st	11:35	8	71	3:20	KSU	Jadon Jackson 9-yard touchdown reception from Will Howard, Chris Tennant kick good	0	7
2nd	14:16	12	56	4:25	KSU	Phillip Brooks 2-yard touchdown run, Chris Tennant kick good	0	14
2nd	3:46	14	73	6:44	TROY	24-yard field goal by Scott Taylor Renfroe	3	14
2nd	0:52	5	75	1:37	TROY	Chris Lewis 21-yard touchdown reception from Gunnar Watson, Scott Taylor Renfroe kick good	10	14
2nd	0:10	5	66	0:39	KSU	Phillip Brooks 39-yard touchdown reception from Will Howard, Chris Tennant kick good	10	21
3rd	3:47	8	44	3:17	KSU	Will Howard 2-yard touchdown run, Chris Tennant kick good	10	28
4th	13:58	6	62	2:02	TROY	37-yard field goal by Scott Taylor Renfroe	13	28
4th	8:48	9	76	5:04	KSU	Treshaun Ward 1-yard touchdown reception from Will Howard, Chris Tennant kick good	13	35
4th	2:50	6	34	3:44	KSU	Will Howard 1-yard touchdown run, Chris Tennant kick good	13	42
"TOP" = time of possession. For other American football terms, see Glossary of American football.							TROY 13	KSU 42

=== at Missouri ===
Game Three – No. 15 Kansas State Wildcats (2–0) at Missouri Tigers (2–0) – Game summary

Quarter	1	2	3	4	Total
No. 15 Kansas State	7	7	10	3	27
Missouri	10	7	0	13	30

at Faurot Field • Columbia, Missouri

- Date: Saturday, September 16, 2023
- Game time: 11:00 a.m. CDT
- Game weather: • Temperature:
- Game attendance: 62,621
- TV announcers (SECN): Taylor Zarzour (play-by-play), Matt Stinchcomb (analyst), and Alyssa Lang (sidelines)

Game information

First quarter

- (10:46) KSU – Phillip Brooks 10-yard pass from Will Howard (Chris Tennant kick) (Drive: 11 plays, 75 yards, 4:14; Kansas State 7-0)
- (7:57) MIZZ – Luther Burden III 47-yard pass from Brady Cook (Harrison Mevis kick) (Drive: 6 plays, 75 yards, 2:49; Tied 7-7)
- (3:58) MIZZ – Harrison Mevis 30-yard field goal (Drive: 7 plays, 35 yards, 3:04; Missouri 10-7)

Second quarter

- (10:05) KSU – Ben Sinnott 3-yard pass from Will Howard (Chris Tennant kick) (Drive: 10 plays, 64 yards, 4:46; Kansas State 14-10)
- (7:36) MIZZ – Brady Cook 1-yard run (Harrison Mevis kick) (Drive: 6 plays, 75 yards, 2:29; Missouri 17-14)

Third quarter

- (10:07) KSU – Chris Tennant 46-yard field goal (Drive: 6 plays, 16 yards, 2:37; Tied 17-17)
- (1:39) KSU – Ben Sinnott 3-yard pass from Will Howard (Chris Tennant kick) (Drive: 12 plays, 74 yards, 5:52; Kansas State 24-17)

Fourth quarter

- (14:14) MIZZ – Harrison Mevis 25-yard field goal (Drive: 6 plays, 68 yards, 1:51; Kansas State 24-20)
- (8:24) MIZZ – Luther Burden III 26-yard pass from Brady Cook (Harrison Mevis kick) (Drive: 2 plays, 77 yards, 0:29; Missouri 27-24)
- (5:25) KSU – Chris Tennant 26-yard field goal (Drive: 8 plays, 67 yards, 2:59; Tied 27-27)
- (0:00) MIZZ – Harrison Mevis 61-yard field goal (Drive: 10 plays, 38 yards, 1:25; Missouri 30-27)

Statistics	KSU	MIZZ
First downs	19	20
Total yards	74–408	64–430
Rushes/yards	35–138	28–74
Passing yards	270	356
Passing: Comp–Att–Int	25–39–1	23–36–0
Time of possession	34:00	26:00

Team	Category	Player	Statistics
Kansas State	Passing	Will Howard	25-39, 270 yards, 3 TD, 1 INT
Kansas State	Rushing	Treshaun Ward	10 carries, 54 yards
Kansas State	Receiving	Ben Sinnott	5 receptions, 78 yards, 2 TD
Missouri	Passing	Brady Cook	23-35, 356 yards, 2 TD
Missouri	Rushing	Cody Schrader	10 carries, 58 yards
Missouri	Receiving	Luther Burden III	7 receptions, 114 yards, 2 TD

=== UCF ===
Game Four – UCF Knights (3–0) at Kansas State Wildcats (2–1) – Game summary

Quarter	1	2	3	4	Total
Knights	10	7	7	7	31
Wildcats	7	14	10	13	44

at Bill Snyder Family Stadium, Manhattan, Kansas

- Date: September 23, 2023
- Game time: 8:00 p.m. EDT
- Game attendance: 51,912
- TV announcers (FS1): Eric Collins and Devin Gardner
- Gamecast

Game information

First Quarter

- Kansas State: D.J. Gidden 1-yard touchdown run (Chris Tennant kick), 11:34
- UCF: Colton Boomer 29-yard field goal, 9:08
- UCF: R.J. Harvey 27-yard touchdown pass from Timmy McClain (Colton Boomer kick), 1:47

Second Quarter

- Kansas State: D.J. Gidden 9-yard touchdown run (Chris Tennant kick), 12:19
- Kansas State: D.J. Gidden 18-yard touchdown run (Chris Tennant kick), 6:20
- UCF: Kobe Hudson 69-yard touchdown pass from Timmy McClain (Colton Boomer Kick), 3:19

Third Quarter

- UCF: Kobe Hudson 46-yard touchdown pass from Timmy McClain (Colton Boomer kick), 13:40
- Kansas State: Chris Tennant 30-yard field goal, 9:33
- Kansas State: Will Howard 2-yard touchdown run (Chris Tennant kick), 1:28

Fourth Quarter

- Kansas State: D.J. Gidden 3-yard touchdown run (PAT failed), 4:01
- Kansas State: Will Howard 31-yard touchdown run (Chris Tennant kick), 2:01
- UCF: R.J. Harvey 1-yard touchdown run (Colton Boomer kick), 0:03

Win Probability

- Kansas State 57.9%

Line

- Kansas State -4.0

Over/Under

- 52.5

Statistics	UCF	KSU
First downs	19	32
Total yards	407	536
Rushing yards	143	255
Passing yards	264	255
Turnovers	2	1
Time of possession	25:37	34:23

Team	Category	Player	Statistics
UCF	Passing	Timmy McClain	14-24, 264 yards, 3 TD, 1 INT
UCF	Rushing	Johnny Richardson	6 carries, 76 yards
UCF	Receiving	Kobe Hudson	6 receptions, 138 yards, 2 TD
Kansas State	Passing	Will Howard	27-42, 255 yards, 1 INT
Kansas State	Rushing	D.J. Giddens	30 carries, 207 yards, 4 TD
Kansas State	Receiving	D.J. Giddens	8 receptions, 96 yards

=== at Oklahoma State ===
Game Five – Kansas State Wildcats (3–1) at Oklahoma State Cowboys (2–2)

Quarter	1	2	3	4	Total
Wildcats	0	7	8	6	21
Cowboys	10	10	6	3	29

at Boone Pickens Stadium • Stillwater, Oklahoma

- Date: Friday, October 6, 2023
- Game time: 6:30 p.m. CDT
- Game weather: • Temperature:
- Game attendance: 62,621
- TV announcers (ESPN): Anish Shroff (play-by-play), Andre Ware (analyst), and Paul Carcaterra (sidelines)

Game information

First quarter

Second quarter

Third quarter

Fourth quarter

Statistics	KSU	OSU
First downs	18	20
Total yards	372	412
Rushing yards	220	174
Passing yards	152	238
Passing: Comp–Att–Int	15-32-3	20-36-0
Time of possession	25:18	34:42

Team	Category	Player	Statistics
Kansas State	Passing	Will Howard	15/34, 152 yards, TD, 3 INT
Kansas State	Rushing	Will Howard	10 carries, 104 yards, TD
Kansas State	Receiving	Phillip Brooks	3 receptions, 50 yards
Oklahoma State	Passing	Alan Bowman	19/35, 235 yards
Oklahoma State	Rushing	Ollie Gordon II	21 carries, 136 yards, TD
Oklahoma State	Receiving	Jaden Bray	4 receptions, 77 yards

=== at Texas Tech ===
Kansas State Wildcats at Texas Tech Red Raiders – Game summary

Quarter	1	2	3	4	Total
Wildcats	10	7	14	7	38
Red Raiders	0	14	7	0	21

at Jones AT&T Stadium, Lubbock, Texas

- Date: October 14
- Game time: 6:00 p.m. CDT
- Game weather: Sunny
- Game attendance: 56,200
- Referee: Derek Anderson
- TV announcers (FS1): Alex Faust and Petros Papadakis
- Box score, Recap

Game information

First quarter

- KSU – Chris Tennant 47-yard field goal, 11:28. Wildcats 3–0. Drive: 8 plays, 50 yards, 3:32.
- KSU – Avery Johnson 2-yard run (Chris Tennant kick), 2:54. Wildcats 10–0. Drive: 5 plays, 59 yards, 2:15.

Second quarter

- TTU – Behren Morton 1-yard run (Gino Garcia kick), 11:53. Wildcats 10–7. Drive: 14 plays, 75 yards, 6:01.
- KSU – Avery Johnson 5-yard run (Chris Tennant kick), 1:20. Wildcats 17–7. Drive: 7 plays, 80 yards, 2:44.
- TTU – Tahj Brooks 2-yard run (Gino Garcia kick), 0:23. Wildcats 17–14. Drive: 7 plays, 89 yards, 0:54.

Third quarter

- TTU – Jerand Bradley 8-yard pass from Jake Strong (Gino Garcia kick), 7:31. Red Raiders 21–17. Drive: 10 plays, 99 yards, 4:04.
- KSU – Avery Johnson 30-yard run (Chris Tennant kick), 2:24. Wildcats 24–21. Drive: 9 plays, 75 yards, 5:07.
- KSU – Avery Johnson 11-yard run (Chris Tennant kick), 2:06. Wildcats 31–21. Drive: 1 play, 11 yards, 0:04.

Fourth quarter

- KSU – Avery Johnson 3-yard run (Chris Tennant kick), 4:58. Wildcats 38–21. Drive: 10 plays, 80 yards, 5:59.

Top passers

- KSU – Will Howard – 6/9, 86 yards
- TTU – Jake Strong – 16/28, 173 yards, TD, 3 INT

Top rushers

- KSU – Treshaun Ward – 15 rushes, 118 yards
- TTU – Tahj Brooks – 17 rushes, 98 yards, TD

Top receivers

- KSU – Ben Sinnott – 6 receptions, 72 yards
- TTU – Coy Eakin – 5 receptions, 102 yards

Starting quarterback Behren Morton exited the game at halftime with an undisclosed injury. Morton had been dealing with a sprained AC joint in his throwing shoulder ever since he took over for the injured Tyler Shough. True freshman Avery Johnson ran for five touchdowns in the game, which he did not start.

=== Houston ===
	1	2	3	4	Total
Cougars	0	0	0	0	0
Wildcats	7	21	7	6	41

=== at No. 7 Texas ===
Team	1	2	3	4	OT	Total
No. 23 Kansas State	0	7	7	16	0	30
• No. 7 Texas	10	7	10	3	3	33

- Date: November 4, 2023
- Location: Darrell K Royal–Texas Memorial Stadium (Austin, TX)
- Game start: 11:05 a.m. CDT
- Game attendance: 102,846
- Game weather: Sunny, 68 °F (20 °C)
- Referee: Kevin Mar
- TV announcers (FOX): Gus Johnson, Joel Klatt, and Jenny Taft

Fox's Big Noon Kickoff show was on Texas's campus for the first time this season.

102,846 is the 5th highest attendance for a game at Darrell K Royal–Texas Memorial Stadium to date

Statistics	Kansas State	Texas
First downs	20	18
Plays–yards	73–360	74–478
Rushes–yards	29–33	37–230
Passing yards	327	248
Passing: comp–att–int	26–41–1	19–37–2
Turnovers		
Time of possession	27:52	32:08

Team	Category	Player	Statistics
Kansas State	Passing	Will Howard	26–42, 327 yards, 4 TD, 1 INT
Kansas State	Rushing	Treshuan Ward	9 carries, 30 yards
Kansas State	Receiving	Jayce Brown	4 receptions, 77 yards, 1 TD
Texas	Passing	Maalik Murphy	19–37, 248 yards, 1 TD, 2 INT
Texas	Rushing	Jonathon Brooks	22 carries, 112 yards, 1 TD
Texas	Receiving	Adonai Mitchell	8 receptions, 149 yards, 1 TD

Scoring summary

Quarter	Time	Drive			Team	Scoring information	Score	
Quarter	Time	Plays	Yards	TOP	Team	Scoring information	Kansas State	Texas
1st	08:36	3	47	01:13	Texas	Adonai Mitchell 37-yard touchdown reception from Maalik Murphy, Bert Auburn kick good	0	7
1st	01:06	9	79	03:58	Texas	32-yard field goal by Bert Auburn	0	10
2nd	11:34	4	63	02:37	Texas	CJ Baxter 54-yard touchdown run, Bert Auburn kick good	0	17
2nd	00:54	4	42	00:41	Kansas State	Phillip Brooks 6-yard touchdown reception from Will Howard, Chris Tennant kick good	7	17
3rd	09:21	1	5	00:05	Texas	Jonathon Brooks 5-yard touchdown run, Bert Auburn kick good	7	24
3rd	04:13	7	41	03:07	Texas	49-yard field goal by Bert Auburn	7	27
3rd	00:00	8	75	04:13	Kansas State	Phillip Brooks 26-yard touchdown reception from Will Howard, Chris Tennant kick good	14	27
4th	13:33	2	12	00:15	Kansas State	Keagan Johnson 12-yard touchdown reception from Will Howard, Chris Tennant kick good	21	27
4th	12:37	1	32	00:07	Kansas State	Jayce Brown 32-yard touchdown reception from Will Howard, 2-point run failed	27	27
4th	06:03	14	69	06:27	Texas	34-yard field goal by Bert Auburn	27	30
4th	00:01	10	33	01:17	Kansas State	45-yard field goal by Chris Tennant	30	30
OT	—	4	1	—	Texas	42-yard field goal by Bert Auburn	30	33
"TOP" = time of possession. For other American football terms, see Glossary of American football.							30	33

=== at No. 25 Kansas ===
Favorite	Spread
Kansas State	–6.5

No. 21 Kansas State Wildcats at No. 25 Kansas Jayhawks

Quarter	1	2	3	4	Total
No. 21 Wildcats	7	9	8	7	31
No. 25 Jayhawks	7	13	7	0	27

at David Booth Kansas Memorial Stadium • Lawrence, Kansas

- Date: Saturday, November 18, 2023
- Game time: 6:00 pm CST
- Game weather: Sunny • Temperature: 55 °F (13 °C)
- Game attendance: 47,233
- Referee: David Alvarez
- TV announcers (FS1): Alex Faust and Petros Papadakis
- Game summary

Game information

First quarter

- 13:44 KSU Will Howard 11 yard pass Ben Sinnott (Chris Tennant kick good) 5–75, 1:16 KSU 7–0
- 2:05 KU Devin Neal 36 yard run (Seth Keller kick good) 11–82, 6:10 7–7

Second quarter

- 10:55 KU Devin Neal 9 yard run (Seth Keller kick blocked) 8–76, 4:28 KU 13–7
- KSU Keenan Garber blocked extra point returned for a two point conversion KU 13–9
- 7:24 KSU Will Howard 11 pass to Keagan Johnson (Chris Tennant kick good) 8–75, 3:33 KSU 16–13
- 0:26 KU Cole Ballard 5 yard pass to Lawrence Arnold (Seth Keller kick good) 13–75, 7:00 KU 20–16

Third quarter

- 13:28 KU Devin Neal 2 yard run (Seth Keller kick good) 3–65, 1:32 KU 27–16
- 6:35 KSU D. J. Giddens 1 yard run (Will Howard run good) 10–87, 4:01 KU 27–24

Fourth quarter

- 10:22 KSU Will Howard 15 yard run (Chris Tennant kick good) 6–55, 3:01 KSU 31–27

Statistics	KSU	KU
First downs	20	19
Plays–yards	61–331	57–396
Rushes–yards	37–166	41–234
Passing yards	165	162
Passing: comp–att–int	13–24–1	11–16–2
Turnovers		
Time of possession	26:40	33:20

Team	Category	Player	Statistics
Kansas State	Passing	Will Howard	13/24 165 yards 2 TDs 1 INT
Kansas State	Rushing	D. J. Giddens	21 carries 102 yards 1 TD
Kansas State	Receiving	Jayce Brown	4 receptions 96 yards
Kansas	Passing	Cole Ballard	11/16 162 yards 1 TD 2 INTs
Kansas	Rushing	Devin Neal	18 carries 138 yards 3 TD
Kansas	Receiving	Mason Fairchild	1 reception 59 yards

In the first matchup in Sunflower Showdown with both teams ranked in 28 years, the teams traded scores early in the game. In the beginning of the second half, Kansas took an 11 point lead. K-State would come back to win the game. It was the 15th straight loss for KU in the rivalry. The loss also officially eliminated Kansas' slim hopes to play in the Big 12 championship game.

=== Iowa State Cyclones ===
Iowa State Cyclones (6–5) vs. Kansas State Wildcats (8–3)

Quarter	1	2	3	4	Total
Iowa State	7	7	14	14	42
Kansas State	6	14	8	7	35

at Bill Snyder Family Football Stadium • Manhattan, KS

- Date: Saturday, November 25, 2023
- Game time: 7:00 p.m. CDT
- Game weather: snow; NW 2 MPH • Temperature: 26°F
- Game attendance: 51,481
- Referee: Derek Anderson
- TV announcers (FOX): Tim Brando, Spencer Tillman, and Josh Sims

Game information

First Quarter

- (14:42) ISU - Sama, Abu 71 yd run (Contreraz, Chase kick) (Drive: 1 play, 71 yards, 0:11; ISU 7–0)
- (8:17) KSU - Tennant, Chris 23 yd field goal (Drive: 7 plays, 34 yards, 3:36; ISU 7–3)
- (0:16) KSU - Tennant, Chris 22 yd field goal (Drive: 14 plays, 80 yards, 6:29; ISU 7–6)

Second Quarter

- (14:47) ISU - Sama, Abu 77 yd run (Contreraz, Chase kick) (Drive: 2 plays, 81 yards, 0:27; ISU 14–6)
- (8:55) KSU - Giddens, DJ 1 yd run (Tennant, Chris kick) (Drive: 12 plays, 87 yards, 5:44; ISU 14–13)
- (0:15) KSU - Sinnott, Ben 15 yd pass from Howard, Will (Tennant, Chris kick) (Drive: 8 plays, 41 yards, 0:49; KSU 20–14)

Third Quarter

- (10:37) ISU - Noel, Jaylin 79 yd pass from Becht, Rocco (Contreraz, Chase kick) (Drive: 2 plays, 82 yards, 0:48; ISU 21–20)
- (6:36) KSU - Howard, Will 5 yd run (Brooks, Phillip pass) (Drive: 9 plays, 79 yards, 3:55; KSU 28–21)
- (4:53) ISU - Sama, Abu 60 yd run (Contreraz, Chase kick) (Drive: 4 plays, 72 yards, 1:37; Tied 28–28)

Fourth Quarter

- (14:49) KSU - Ward, Treshaun 2 yd run (Tennant, Chris kick) (Drive: 11 plays, 75 yards, 5:04; KSU 35–28)
- (12:31) ISU - Higgins, Jayden 33 yd pass from Becht, Rocco (Contreraz, Chase kick) (Drive: 4 plays, 60 yards, 2:10; Tied 35–35)
- (8:04) ISU - Noel, Jaylin 82 yd pass from Becht, Rocco (Contreraz, Chase kick) (Drive: 3 plays, 76 yards, 2:03; ISU 42–35)

Statistics	ISU	KSU
First downs	10	32
Total yards	488	497
Rushes/yards	23/258	54/209
Passing yards	230	288
Passing: Comp–Att–Int	8–12–0	24–48–1
Turnovers	2	1
Time of possession	17:48	42:12

Team	Category	Player	Statistics
ISU	Passing	Rocco Becht	8–12, 230 YDS, 3 TD
ISU	Rushing	Abu Sama III	16 CAR, 276 YDS, 3 TD
ISU	Receiving	Jaylin Noel	3 REC, 160 YDS, 2 TD
KSU	Passing	Will Howard	24–48, 288 yards, TD, INT
KSU	Rushing	DJ Giddens	31 CAR, 114 YDS, TD
KSU	Receiving	Ben Sinnott	10 REC, 136 YDS, TD

=== vs No. 18 NC State (Pop-Tarts Bowl) ===
2023 Pop-Tarts Bowl
No. 18 NC State Wolfpack (9-3, 6-2) vs No. 25 Kansas State Wildcats (8-4, 6-3) – Game summary

Quarter	1	2	3	4	Total
No. 18 Wolfpack	0	10	9	0	19
No. 25 Wildcats	7	14	0	7	28

at Camping World Stadium • Orlando, Florida

- Date: Thursday, December 28th, 2023
- Game time: 5:45 p.m. EST
- Game weather: Cloudy • Temperature: 61 °F (16 °C) • Wind: 7 mph (11 km/h) W
- Game attendance: 31,111
- Referee: Larry Smith
- TV announcers (ESPN/ESPN Radio): Anish Shroff (play-by-play), Andre Ware (analyst), and Paul Carcaterra (sideline)/Sean Kelley (play-by-play) and Rene Ingoglia (analyst)
- Box score

Game information

First quarter

- (12:35) KSU – DJ Giddens 37 yard pass from Avery Johnson, Chris Tennant kick (Drive: 6 plays, 75 yards, 2:25; Kansas State 7–0)

Second quarter

- (7:29) KSU – DJ Giddens 4 yard run, Chris Tennant kick (Drive: 9 plays, 90 yards, 4:49; Kansas State 14–0)
- (3:22) NCSU – Brennan Armstrong 31 yard run, Brayden Narveson kick (Drive: 9 plays, 76 yards, 4:07; Kansas State 14–7)
- (0:55) KSU – Avery Johnson 19 yard run, Chris Tennant kick (Drive: 10 plays, 75 yards, 2:27; Kansas State 21–7)
- (0:00) NCSU – Brayden Narveson 26 yard field goal (Drive: 8 plays, 57 yards, 0:00; Kansas State 21–10)

Third quarter

- (12:51) NCSU – Brayden Narveson 49 yard field goal (Drive: 6 plays, 44 yards, 2:09; Kansas State 21–13)
- (1:50) NCSU – Trent Pennix 60 yard run, two point pass conversion failed (Drive: 7 plays, 75 yards, 4:03; Kansas State 21–19)

Fourth quarter

- (2:48) KSU – Jayce Brown 11 yard pass from Avery Johnson, Chris Tennant kick (Drive: 15 plays, 72 yards, 7:24; Kansas State 28–19)

Statistics	No. 18 NC State	No. 25 Kansas State
First downs	17	22
Total yards	62–399	71–435
Rushes/yards	33–235	40–257
Passing yards	164	178
Passing: Comp–Att–Int	14–29–1	14–31–0
Turnovers	1	0
Time of possession	29:06	30:54

Team	Category	Player	Statistics
No. 18 NC State	Passing	Brennan Armstrong	14/28, 164 yards, INT
No. 18 NC State	Rushing	Brennan Armstrong	17 carries, 121 yards, TD
No. 18 NC State	Receiving	Kevin Concepcion	7 receptions, 72 yards
No. 25 Kansas State	Passing	Avery Johnson	14/31, 178 yards, 2 TD
No. 25 Kansas State	Rushing	DJ Giddens	28 carries, 151 yards, TD
No. 25 Kansas State	Receiving	Jayce Brown	5 receptions, 52 yards, TD

== Rankings ==
Ranking movements Legend: ██ Increase in ranking ██ Decrease in ranking — = Not ranked RV = Received votes
	Week															
Poll	Pre	1	2	3	4	5	6	7	8	9	10	11	12	13	14	Final
AP	16	15	15	RV	RV	RV	—	—	RV	25	RV	23	19	RV	RV	18
Coaches	17	15	15	RV	25	RV	—	RV	RV	RV	RV	24	20	RV	RV	19
CFP	Not released									23	25	21	19	25	25	Not released
