= KC Concepcion =

KC Concepcion may refer to:

- KC Concepcion (actress) (born 1985), Filipino actress
- KC Concepcion (American football) (born 2004), American football player
