= 2023 NC State Wolfpack football team =

American college football season

2023 NC State Wolfpack football

Pop-Tarts Bowl, L 19–28 vs. Kansas State
- Conference: Atlantic Coast Conference

Ranking
- Coaches: No. 21
- AP: No. 21
- Record: 9–4 (6–2 ACC)
- Head coach: Dave Doeren (11th season)
- Offensive coordinator: Robert Anae (1st season)
- Offensive scheme: Veer and shoot
- Defensive coordinator: Tony Gibson (5th season)
- Base defense: 3–3–5
- Home stadium: Carter–Finley Stadium

2023 Atlantic Coast Conference football standings
	Conf.			Overall
Team	W		L	W		L
No. 6 Florida State y$	8	–	0	13	–	1
No. 19 Louisville y	7	–	1	10	–	4
No. 21 NC State	6	–	2	9	–	4
Georgia Tech	5	–	3	7	–	6
Virginia Tech	5	–	3	7	–	6
No. 20 Clemson	4	–	4	9	–	4
Duke	4	–	4	8	–	5
North Carolina	4	–	4	8	–	5
Boston College	3	–	5	7	–	6
Miami (FL)	3	–	5	7	–	6
Syracuse	2	–	6	6	–	7
Pittsburgh	2	–	6	3	–	9
Virginia	2	–	6	3	–	9
Wake Forest	1	–	7	4	–	8
Championship: Florida State 16, Louisville 6
$ – Conference champion; y – Championship game participant; Rankings from AP Poll

The 2023 NC State Wolfpack football team represented North Carolina State University during the 2023 NCAA Division I FBS football season. The Wolfpack played their home games at Carter–Finley Stadium in Raleigh, North Carolina, and competed as members of the Atlantic Coast Conference. They were led by head coach Dave Doeren, in his 11th season. The NC State Wolfpack football team drew an average home attendance of 56,919 in 2023.

== Coaching staff ==
Name	Title
Dave Doeren	Head Coach
Robert Anae	Offensive Coordinator/Inside Receivers/Tight Ends
Tony Gibson	Defensive Coordinator/Linebackers
Charlie Wiles	Defensive Line
Joe DeForest	Safeties
Freddie Aughtry-Lindsay	Nickels
Todd Goebbel	Running Backs/Special Teams
Garett Tujague	Offensive Line
Brian Mitchell	Cornerbacks
Kurt Roper	Quarterbacks
Joker Phillips	Receivers
Ruffin McNeill	Special Assistant to the Head Coach

== Schedule ==
NC State announced its 2023 football schedule on January 30, 2023. The 2023 season is the first that the Atlantic Coast Conference eliminated divisions, and thus the Wolfpack will face conference opponents on a rotational pod basis. The 2023 schedule consists of seven home games and five away games in the regular season. The Wolfpack will host ACC foes Clemson, Louisville, Miami and North Carolina and will travel to Duke, Virginia, Virginia Tech, and Wake Forest.

The Wolfpack will host three of the four non-conference opponents, Marshall from the Sun Belt Conference, Notre Dame from FBS Independents, and VMI from Division I FCS, and will travel to UConn from FBS Independents.

Date	Time	Opponent	Rank	Site	TV	Result	Attendance
August 31	7:30 p.m.	at UConn*		Pratt & Whitney Stadium; East Hartford, CT	CBSSN	W 24–14	36,526
September 9	12:00 p.m.	No. 10 Notre Dame*		Carter–Finley Stadium; Raleigh, NC	ABC	L 24–45	56,919
September 16	2:00 p.m.	VMI*		Carter–Finley Stadium; Raleigh, NC	CW	W 45–7	56,919
September 22	7:30 p.m.	at Virginia		Scott Stadium; Charlottesville, VA	ESPN	W 24–21	42,979
September 29	7:00 p.m.	Louisville		Carter–Finley Stadium; Raleigh, NC	ESPN	L 10–13	56,919
October 7	2:00 p.m.	Marshall*		Carter–Finley Stadium; Raleigh, NC	CW	W 48–41	56,919
October 14	8:00 p.m.	at No. 17 Duke		Wallace Wade Stadium; Durham, NC (rivalry)	ACCN	L 3–24	31,833
October 28	2:00 p.m	Clemson^{†}		Carter–Finley Stadium; Raleigh, NC (Textile Bowl)	CW	W 24–17	56,919
November 4	8:00 p.m.	Miami		Carter–Finley Stadium; Raleigh, NC	ACCN	W 20–6	56,919
November 11	2:00 p.m	at Wake Forest		Allegacy Federal Credit Union Stadium; Winston-Salem, NC (rivalry)	CW	W 26–6	29,591
November 18	3:30 p.m.	at Virginia Tech		Lane Stadium; Blacksburg, VA	ACCN	W 35–28	65,632
November 25	8:00 p.m.	North Carolina	No. 22	Carter–Finley Stadium; Raleigh, NC (rivalry)	ACCN	W 39–20	56,919
December 28	5:45 p.m.	vs. No. 25 Kansas State*	No. 18	Camping World Stadium; Orlando, FL (Pop-Tarts Bowl)	ESPN	L 19–28	31,111
*Non-conference game; ^{†}Homecoming; Rankings from AP Poll (and CFP Rankings, after October 31) - Released prior to game; All times are in Eastern time

== Game summaries ==
=== At UConn ===
NC State at UConn

Team	1	2	3	4	Total
• Wolfpack	7	3	14	0	24
Huskies	7	0	7	0	14

- Date: August 31, 2023
- Location: Rentschler Field
  East Hartford, CT
- Game start: 7:30 p.m. EDT
- Elapsed time: 3 hours, 6 minutes
- Game attendance: 36,526
- Game weather: Temperature: 76 °F (24 °C) • Weather: Sunny
- Referee: Stuart Mullins
- TV announcers (CBSSN): Ed Cohen (play–by–play), Christian Fauria (analyst), Keiana Martin (sideline reporter)

Scoring summary
1	08:21	CONN	Victor Rosa 18 yard run (Joe McFadden kick) (12 plays, 75 yards, 6:39)	CONN 7–0
1	02:40	NCSU	Brennan Armstrong 4 yard run (Brayden Narveson kick) (9 plays, 66 yards, 4:27)	Tied 7–7
2	00:00	NCSU	Brayden Narveson 44 yard field goal (12 plays, 59 yards, 2:56)	NCSU 10–7
3	02:22	NCSU	Delbert Mims 1 yard run (Brayden Narveson kick) (11 plays, 91 yards, 6:27)	NCSU 17–7
3	02:04	CONN	Victor Rosa 71 yard run (Joe McFadden kick) (1 play, 71 yards, 0:11)	NCSU 17–14
3	00:34	NCSU	Brennan Armstrong 8 yard run (Brayden Narveson kick) (4 plays, 27 yards, 1:20)	NCSU 24–14

Statistics	NCSU	CONN
First downs	23	15
Total yards	364	273
Rushing yards	209	160
Passing yards	155	113
Turnovers	0	1
Time of possession	34:00	26:00

Team	Category	Player	Statistics
NC State	Passing	Brennan Armstrong	17–26, 155 yards
NC State	Rushing	Brennan Armstrong	19 carries, 96 yards, 2 TD
NC State	Receiving	Kevin Concepcion	4 receptions, 36 yards
UConn	Passing	Joe Fagnano	14–26, 113 yards, 1 INT
UConn	Rushing	Victor Rosa	9 carries, 99 yards, 2 TD
UConn	Receiving	Justin Joly	4 receptions, 38 yards

=== No. 10 Notre Dame ===
No. 10 Notre Dame at NC State

Team	1	2	3	4	Total
• No. 10 Fighting Irish	3	14	7	21	45
Wolfpack	0	7	10	7	24

- Date: September 9, 2023
- Location: Carter–Finley Stadium
  Raleigh, NC
- Game start: 12:00 p.m. EDT
- Elapsed time: 5 hours, 24 minutes (1 hour, 45 minute delay due to weather)
- Game attendance: 56,919
- Game weather: Temperature: 79 °F (26 °C) • Weather: Cloudy • Wind: SE 5 MPH
- Referee: Adam Savole
- TV announcers (ABC): Sean McDonough (play-by-play), Greg McElroy (analyst), and Molly McGrath (sideline)

Scoring summary
1	03:18	ND	Spencer Shrader 54 yard field goal (12 plays, 50 yards, 5:51)	ND 3–0
2	14:32	ND	Audric Estimé 80 yard run (Spencer Shrader kick) (1 play, 80 yards, 0:13)	ND 10–0
2	01:16	NCSU	Bradley Rozner 9 yard pass from Brennan Armstrong (Brayden Narveson kick) (7 plays, 62 yards, 1:03)	ND 10–7
2	00:40	ND	Jaden Greathouse 13 yard pass from Sam Hartman (Spencer Shrader kick) (3 plays, 78 yards, 0:30)	ND 17–7
3	07:27	NCSU	Brayden Narveson 49 yard field goal (5 plays, 33 yards, 1:15)	ND 17–10
3	05:50	ND	Holden Staes 40 yard pass from Sam Hartman (Spencer Shrader kick) (3 plays, 76 yards, 1:30)	ND 24–10
3	02:55	NCSU	Brennan Armstrong 1 yard run (Brayden Narveson kick) (7 plays, 75 yards, 2:55)	ND 24–17
4	11:38	ND	Davis Sherwood 10 yard pass from Sam Hartman (Spencer Shrader kick) (5 plays, 33 yards, 2:43)	ND 31–17
4	10:42	ND	Audric Estimé 7 yard run (Spencer Shrader kick) (3 plays, 16 yards, 0:36)	ND 38–17
4	04:35	ND	Holden Staes 35 yard pass from Sam Hartman (Spencer Shrader kick) (5 plays, 54 yards, 3:03)	ND 45–17
4	02:03	NCSU	Dacari Collins 23 yard pass from Brennan Armstrong (Brayden Narveson kick) (9 plays, 65 yards, 2:32)	ND 45–24

Statistics	ND	NCSU
First downs	16	20
Total yards	456	344
Rushing yards	170	84
Passing yards	286	260
Turnovers	1	3
Time of possession	32:53	27:07

Team	Category	Player	Statistics
Notre Dame	Passing	Sam Hartman	15–24, 286 yards, 4 TD
Notre Dame	Rushing	Audric Estimé	14 rushes, 134 yards, 2 TD
Notre Dame	Receiving	Holden Staes	4 receptions, 115 yards, 2 TD
NC State	Passing	Brennan Armstrong	22–47, 260 yards, 2 TD, 3 INT
NC State	Rushing	Brennan Armstrong	12 rushes, 26 yards, 1 TD
NC State	Receiving	Juice Vereen	4 receptions, 65 yards

=== VMI ===
VMI at NC State

Team	1	2	3	4	Total
Keydets	0	0	7	0	7
• Wolfpack	21	10	7	7	45

- Date: September 16, 2023
- Location: Carter–Finley Stadium
  Raleigh, NC
- Game start: 2:00 p.m. EDT
- Elapsed time: 2 hours, 53 minutes
- Game attendance: 56,919
- Game weather: Temperature 80 °F (27 °C) • Weather: Sunny • Wind: NE 5 MPH
- Referee: Gary Patterson
- TV announcers (CW): Tom Werme (play-by-play), James Bates (analyst), and Treavor Scales (sideline)

Scoring summary
1	08:27	NCSU	Delbert Mimms III 1 yard run (Brayden Narveson kick) (12 plays, 58 yards, 5:35)	NCSU 7–0
1	07:07	NCSU	Robert Kennedy 30 yard interception return (Brayden Narveson kick)	NCSU 14–0
1	02:51	NCSU	Bradley Rozner 16 yard pass from Brennan Armstrong (Brayden Narveson kick) (4 plays, 82 yards, 1:35)	NCSU 21–0
2	07:37	NCSU	Brayden Narveson 31 yard field goal (17 plays, 83 yards, 7:46)	NCSU 24–0
2	00:25	NCSU	Delbert Mimms III 1 yard run (12 plays, 80 yards, 4:54)	NCSU 31–0
3	02:36	VMI	Egypt Nelson 22 yard pass from Collin Shannon (Caden Beck kick) (7 plays, 68 yards, 3:21)	NCSU 31–7
3	02:25	NCSU	Julian Gray 82 yard kickoff return (Brayden Narveson kick)	NCSU 38–7
4	07:45	NCSU	Demarcus Jones II 2 yard run (Brayden Narveson kick) (12 plays, 96 yards, 5:57)	NCSU 45–7

Statistics	VMI	NCSU
First downs	10	26
Total yards	176	498
Rushing yards	15	234
Passing yards	176	264
Turnovers	1	0
Time of possession	20:57	39:03

Team	Category	Player	Statistics
VMI	Passing	Collin Shannon	14–24, 176 yards, 1 TD, 1 INT
VMI	Rushing	Rashad Raymond	6 rushes, 29 yards
VMI	Receiving	Egypt Nelson	3 receptions, 107 yards, 1 TD
NC State	Passing	Brennan Armstrong	27–32, 264 yards, 1 TD
NC State	Rushing	Kendrick Raphael	16 rushes, 85 yards
NC State	Receiving	Julian Gray	2 receptions, 80 yards

=== At Virginia ===
NC State at Virginia

Team	1	2	3	4	Total
• Wolfpack	0	14	7	3	24
Cavaliers	0	7	6	8	21

- Date: September 22, 2023
- Location: Scott Stadium
  Charlottesville, VA
- Game start: 7:30 p.m. EDT
- Elapsed time: 3 hours, 39 minutes
- Game attendance: 42,979
- Game weather: Sunny
- Referee: Riley Johnson
- TV announcers (ESPN): Anish Shroff (play-by-play), Andre Ware (analyst), Paul Carcaterra (sideline)

Scoring summary
2	04:55	NCSU	KC Concepcion 12 yard pass from Brennan Armstrong (Brayden Narveson kick) (7 plays, 49 yards, 2:43)	NCSU 7–0
2	11:46	UVA	Malik Washington 8 yard pass from Anthony Colandrea (Will Bettridge kick) (8 plays, 75 yards, 3:09)	Tied 7–7
2	00:28	NCSU	Delbert Mimms III 1 yard run (Brayden Narveson kick) (8 plays, 67 yards, 2:36)	NCSU 14–7
3	06:48	UVA	Will Bettridge 21 yard field goal (5 plays, 60 yards, 1:59)	NCSU 14–10
3	02:24	UVA	Will Bettridge 36 yard field goal (5 plays, 38 yards, 2:58)	NCSU 14–13
3	00:11	NCSU	KC Concepcion 48 yard pass from Brennan Armstrong (Brayden Narveson kick) (5 plays, 74 yards, 2:13)	NCSU 21–13
4	00:36	UVA	Malik Washington 3 yard pass from Anthony Colandrea (Malachi Fields pass from Anthony Colandrea for 2-point conversion) (11 plays, 66 yards, 2:53)	Tied 21–21
4	00:00	NCSU	Brayden Narveson 33 yard field goal (5 plays, 33 yards, 0:36)	NCSU 24–21

Statistics	NCSU	UVA
First downs	21	20
Total yards	319	384
Rushing yards	139	113
Passing yards	180	271
Turnovers	1	2
Time of possession	27:26	32:34

Team	Category	Player	Statistics
NC State	Passing	Brennan Armstrong	15–30, 180 yards, 2 TD, 1 INT
NC State	Rushing	Brennan Armstrong	15 rushes, 64 yards
NC State	Receiving	KC Concepcion	6 receptions, 116 yards, 2 TD
Virginia	Passing	Anthony Colandrea	18–30, 271 yards, 2 TD, 2 INT
Virginia	Rushing	Anthony Colandrea	13 rushes, 43 yards
Virginia	Receiving	Malik Washington	10 receptions, 170 yards, 2 TD

=== Louisville ===
Louisville at NC State

Team	1	2	3	4	Total
• Cardinals	0	0	10	3	13
Wolfpack	0	10	0	0	10

- Date: September 29, 2023
- Location: Carter–Finley Stadium
  Raleigh, NC
- Game start: 7:00 p.m. EDT
- Elapsed time: 3 hours, 22 minutes
- Game attendance: 56,919
- Game weather: 69 °F (21 °C) • Weather: Sunny • Wind: NE 4 MPH
- Referee: Jerry Magallanes
- TV announcers (ESPN): Anish Shroff (play-by-play), Andre Ware (analyst), Paul Carcaterra (sideline)

Scoring summary
2	6:27	NCSU	Delbert Mimms III 4-yard run (Brayden Narveson kick) (13 plays, 65 yards, 6:54)	NCSU 7–0
2	0:00	NCSU	Brayden Narveson 48-yard field goal	NCSU 10–0
3	6:38	LOU	Chris Bell 39-yard pass from Jack Plummer (Brock Travelstead kick) (3 plays, 46 yards, 0:56)	NCSU 10–7
3	1:32	LOU	Brock Travelstead 33-yard field goal (7 plays, 40 yards, 3:13)	TIED 10–10
4	5:32	LOU	Brock Travelstead 53-yard field goal (10 plays, 41 yards, 5:13)	LOU 13–10

Statistics	LOU	NCSU
First downs	18	9
Total yards	306	201
Rushing yards	20	89
Passing yards	286	112
Turnovers	3	3
Time of possession	31:03	28:57

Team	Category	Player	Statistics
Louisville	Passing	Jack Plummer	21–35, 286 yards, 1 TD, 2 INT
Louisville	Rushing	Jawhar Jordan	16 rushes, 32 yards
Louisville	Receiving	Chris Bell	3 receptions, 85 yards, 1 TD
NC State	Passing	Brennan Armstrong	13–25, 112 yards, 2 INT
NC State	Rushing	Brennan Armstrong	17 rushes, 65 yards
NC State	Receiving	Terrell Timmons Jr.	3 receptions, 71 yards

=== Marshall ===
Marshall at NC State

Team	1	2	3	4	Total
Thundering Herd	14	10	10	7	41
• Wolfpack	7	14	14	13	48

- Date: October 7, 2023
- Location: Carter–Finley Stadium
  Raleigh, NC
- Game start: 2:00 p.m. EDT
- Elapsed time: 3 hours, 58 minutes
- Game attendance: 56,919
- Game weather: 72 °F (22 °C) • Weather: Sunny • Wind: NW 11 MPH
- Referee: Jeff Flanagan
- TV announcers (CW): Evan Lepler (play-by-play), James Bates (analyst), and Treavor Scales (sideline)

Scoring summary
1	11:14	MRSH	Cam Fancher 7-yard run (Rece Verhoff kick) (4 plays, 29 yards, 1:27)	MRSH 7–0
1	8:20	NCSU	Kevin Concepcion 17-yard pass from MJ Morris (Brayden Narveson kick) (7 plays, 43 yards, 2:47)	TIED 7–7
1	2:57	MRSH	Josh Moten 27-yard interception return (Rece Verhoff kick) (2 plays, 0 yards, 0:13)	MRSH 14–7
2	11:43	NCSU	Delbert Mimms III 18-yard run (Brayden Narveson kick) (6 plays, 55 yards, 2:23)	TIED 14–14
2	9:45	NCSU	Trent Pennix 39-yard pass from MJ Morris (Brayden Narveson kick) (1 play, 39 yards, 0:07)	NCSU 21–14
2	2:34	MRSH	Rece Verhoff 43-yard field goal (9 plays, 34 yards, 3:56)	NCSU 21–17
2	0:31	MRSH	Cam Fancher 4-yard run (Rece Verhoff kick) (5 plays, 66 yards, 1:18)	MRSH 24–21
3	9:03	NCSU	Michael Allen 37-yard run (Brayden Narveson kick) (6 plays, 58 yards, 3:23)	NCSU 28–24
3	7:31	MRSH	Jayden Harrison 28-yard pass from Cam Fancher (Rece Verhoff kick) (5 plays, 75 yards, 1:32)	MRSH 31–28
3	6:43	NCSU	Trent Pennix 62-yard pass from MJ Morris (Brayden Narveson kick) (2 plays, 68 yards, 0:43)	NCSU 35–31
3	1:24	MRSH	Rece Verhoff 26-yard field goal (10 plays, 66 yards, 5:19)	NCSU 35–34
4	14:44	NCSU	Brayden Narveson 40-yard field goal (5 plays, 45 yards, 1:33)	NCSU 38–34
4	7:03	NCSU	Brayden Narveson 27-yard field goal (7 plays, 45 yards, 3:16)	NCSU 41–34
4	6:04	NCSU	Kevin Concepcion 8-yard pass from MJ Morris (Brayden Narveson kick) (2 plays, 9 yards, 0:47)	NCSU 48–34
4	1:29	MRSH	Caleb Coombs 16-yard pass from Cam Fancher (Rece Verhoff kick) (16 plays, 76 yards, 4:30)	NCSU 48–41

Statistics	HERD	NCSU
First downs	22	16
Total yards	419	401
Rushing yards	104	136
Passing yards	315	365
Turnovers	3	3
Time of possession	32:44	27:16

Team	Category	Player	Statistics
Marshall	Passing	Cam Fancher	29–51, 315 yards, 2 TD, 1 INT
Marshall	Rushing	Rasheen Ali	14 rushes, 63 yards
Marshall	Receiving	Darryle Simmons	8 receptions, 87 yards
NC State	Passing	MJ Morris	17–32, 265 yards, 4 TD, 3 INT
NC State	Rushing	Michael Allen	9 rushes, 70 yards, 1 TD
NC State	Receiving	KC Concepcion	8 receptions, 102 yards, 2 TD

=== At No. 17 Duke ===
NC State at No. 17 Duke

Team	1	2	3	4	Total
Wolfpack	3	0	0	0	3
• No. 17 Blue Devils	7	10	7	0	24

- Date: October 14, 2023
- Location: Wallace Wade Stadium
  Durham, NC
- Game start: 8:00 p.m. EDT
- Elapsed time: 3 hours, 4 minutes
- Game attendance: 31,833
- Game weather: Cloudy
- Referee: Mike Roche
- TV announcers (ACCN): Wes Durham (play-by-play), Tim Hasselbeck (analyst), and Taylor Tannebaum (sideline)

Scoring summary

Statistics	NCSU	DUKE
First downs	18	12
Total yards	305	301
Rushing yards	112	194
Passing yards	193	107
Turnovers	1	1
Time of possession	36:56	23:04

Team	Category	Player	Statistics
NC State	Passing	MJ Morris	24–40, 193 yards, 1 INT
NC State	Rushing	MJ Morris	14 rushes, 38 yards
NC State	Receiving	KC Concepcion	6 receptions, 63 yards
Duke	Passing	Henry Belin IV	4–12, 107 yards, 2 TD, 1 INT
Duke	Rushing	Jordan Waters	13 rushes, 123 yards, 1 TD
Duke	Receiving	Jalon Calhoun	1 reception, 69 yards, 1 TD

=== Clemson ===
Clemson at NC State

Team	1	2	3	4	Total
Tigers	0	7	0	10	17
• Wolfpack	7	3	14	0	24

- Date: October 28, 2023
- Location: Carter–Finley Stadium
  Raleigh, NC
- Game start: 2:00 p.m EDT
- Game attendance: 56,919
- Game weather: 81 °F (27 °C) • Weather: Sunny • Wind: NW 4 MPH
- Referee: Jeff Heaser
- TV announcers (CW): Tom Werme (play-by-play), James Bates (analyst), and Treavor Scales (sideline)

Scoring summary
1	7:18	NCSU	Kevin Concepcion 9-yard pass from MJ Morris (Brayden Narveson kick) (4 plays, 60 yards, 2:23)	NCSU 7–0
2	12:11	NCSU	Brayden Narveson 41-yard field goal (8 plays, 55 yards, 4:52)	NCSU 10–0
2	8:24	CLEM	Phil Mafah 1-yard rush (Jonathan Weitz kick) (9 plays, 75 yards, 3:47)	NCSU 10–7
3	10:01	NCSU	Payton Wilson 15-yard interception return (Brayden Narveson kick) (1 play, 15 yards, 0:08)	NCSU 17–7
3	4:35	NCSU	Kevin Concepcion 72-yard pass from MJ Morris (Brayden Narveson kick) (3 plays, 80 yards, 1:40)	NCSU 24–7
4	14:57	CLEM	Phil Mafah 1-yard rush (Jonathan Weitz kick) (10 plays, 75 yards, 4:38)	NCSU 24–14
4	6:57	CLEM	Jonathan Weitz 19-yard field goal (5 plays, 49 yards, 1:47)	NCSU 24–17

Statistics	CLEM	NCSU
First downs	20	9
Total yards	364	202
Rushing yards	101	64
Passing yards	263	138
Turnovers	2	0
Time of possession	33:41	26:19

Team	Category	Player	Statistics
Clemson	Passing	Cade Klubnik	33–50, 263 yards, 2 INT
Clemson	Rushing	Phil Mafah	16 rushes, 84 yards
Clemson	Receiving	Jake Briningstool	8 receptions, 93 yards
NC State	Passing	MJ Morris	11–20, 138 yards, 2 TD
NC State	Rushing	KC Concepcion	2 rushes, 51 yards
NC State	Receiving	KC Concepcion	5 receptions, 83 yards, 2 TD

=== Miami ===
Miami at NC State

Team	1	2	3	4	Total
Hurricanes	3	3	0	0	6
• Wolfpack	7	3	0	10	20

- Date: November 4, 2023
- Location: Carter–Finley Stadium
  Raleigh, NC
- Game start: 8:00 p.m. EDT
- Elapsed time: 3 hours, 13 minutes
- Game attendance: 56,919
- Game weather: 54 °F (12 °C) • Weather: Clear • Wind: NE 4 MPH
- Referee: Jerry Magallanes
- TV announcers (ACCN): Wes Durham (play-by-play), Tim Hasselbeck (analyst), and Taylor Tannebaum (sideline)

Scoring summary
1	6:57	MIA	Andres Borregales 48-yard field goal (12 plays, 43 yards, 5:06)	MIA 3–0
1	2:17	NCSU	Jordan Poole 12-yard pass from MJ Morris (Brayden Narveson kick) (5 plays, 72 yards, 2:06)	NCSU 7–3
2	13:09	MIA	Andres Borregales 27-yard field goal (9 plays, 66 yards, 4:08)	NCSU 7–6
2	2:55	NCSU	Brayden Narveson 39-yard field goal (4 plays, –12 yards, 2:06)	NCSU 10–6
4	5:03	NCSU	Kendrick Raphael 31-yard run (Brayden Narveson kick) (8 plays, 97 yards, 4:44)	NCSU 17–6
4	1:37	NCSU	Brayden Narveson 19-yard field goal (6 plays, 14 yards, 2:15)	NCSU 20–6

Statistics	MIA	NCSU
First downs	19	12
Total yards	292	231
Rushing yards	119	108
Passing yards	173	123
Turnovers	4	2
Time of possession	35:16	24:44

Team	Category	Player	Statistics
Miami	Passing	Tyler Van Dyke	21–38, 173 yards, 3 INT
Miami	Rushing	Mark Fletcher Jr.	23 rushes, 115 yards
Miami	Receiving	Jacolby George	5 receptions, 59 yards
NC State	Passing	MJ Morris	11–23, 123 yards, 1 TD, 1 INT
NC State	Rushing	Brennan Armstrong	8 rushes, 51 yards
NC State	Receiving	KC Concepcion	5 receptions, 61 yards

=== At Wake Forest ===
NC State at Wake Forest

Team	1	2	3	4	Total
• Wolfpack	7	14	0	5	26
Demon Deacons	0	0	0	6	6

- Date: November 11, 2023
- Location: Allegacy Federal Credit Union Stadium
  Winston-Salem, NC
- Game start: 2:00 p.m EST
- Game attendance: 29,591
- TV announcers (CW): Tom Werme (play-by-play), James Bates (analyst), and Treavor Scales (sideline)

Scoring summary

Statistics	NCSU	WAKE
First downs	19	8
Total yards	379	163
Rushing yards	268	7
Passing yards	111	156
Turnovers	1	2
Time of possession	40:16	19:44

Team	Category	Player	Statistics
NC State	Passing	Brennan Armstrong	12–17, 113 yards, 1 TD
NC State	Rushing	Brennan Armstrong	15 rushes, 96 yards, 1 TD
NC State	Receiving	Dacari Collins	2 receptions, 40 yards
Wake Forest	Passing	Michael Kern	14–26, 137 yards, 1 TD, 1 INT
Wake Forest	Rushing	Demond Claiborne	8 rushes, 12 yards
Wake Forest	Receiving	Horatio Fields	3 receptions, 31 yards

=== At Virginia Tech ===
NC State at Virginia Tech

Team	1	2	3	4	Total
• Wolfpack	0	21	14	0	35
Hokies	0	7	7	14	28

- Date: November 18, 2023
- Location: Lane Stadium
  Blacksburg, VA
- Game start: 3:30 p.m. EST
- Game attendance: 65,632
- Game weather: Sunny • Temperature: 53 °F (12 °C)
- Referee: Jeff Flanagan
- TV announcers (ACCN): Chris Cotter (play-by-play), Mark Herzlich (analyst) and Sherree Burruss (sideline)

Scoring summary
2	12:04	NCSU	Kevin "KC" Concepcion 3-yard from Brennan Armstrong (Brayden Narveson kick) (7 plays, 64 yards, 4:05)	NCSU 7–0
2	4:46	NCSU	Brennan Armstrong 1-yard rush (Brayden Narveson kick) (8 plays, 60 yards, 4:49)	NCSU 14–0
2	4:26	VT	Xayvion Turner-Bradshaw 47-yard rush (Josh Love kick) (1 play, 47 yards, 0:11)	NCSU 14–7
2	0:18	NCSU	Kevin "KC" Concepcion 28-yard pass from Brennan Armstrong (Brayden Narveson kick) (11 plays, 75 yards, 4:08)	NCSU 21–7
3	9:03	NCSU	Brennan Armstrong 1-yard rush (Brayden Narveson kick) (12 plays, 75 yards, 5:57)	NCSU 28–7
3	8:10	VT	Da'Quan Felton 42-yard pass from Kyron Drones (John Love kick) (2 plays, 76 yards, 0:46)	NCSU 28–14
3	5:53	NCSU	Trent Pennix 17-yard pass from Kevin "KC" Concepcion (Brayden Narveson kick) (4 plays, 75 yards, 2:17)	NCSU 35–14
4	7:03	VT	Da'Quan Felton 12-yard passing from Kyron Drones (John Love kick) (10 plays, 92 yards, 3:49)	NCSU 35–21
4	1:40	VT	Stephen Gosnell 13-yard pass from Kyron Drones (John Love kick) (4 plays, 56 yards, 1:11)	NCSU 35–28

Statistics	NCSU	VT
First downs	24	17
Total yards	408	349
Rushing yards	188	124
Passing yards	220	225
Turnovers	0	1
Time of possession	40:37	19:23

Team	Category	Player	Statistics
NC State	Passing	Brennan Armstrong	18–26, 203 yards, 2 TD
NC State	Rushing	Brennan Armstrong	21 rushes, 89 yards, 2 TD
NC State	Receiving	KC Concepcion	7 receptions, 63 yards, 2 TD
Virginia Tech	Passing	Kyron Drones	17–30, 225 yards, 3 TD, 1 INT
Virginia Tech	Rushing	Kyron Drones	9 rushes, 51 yards
Virginia Tech	Receiving	Da'Quan Felton	7 receptions, 87 yards, 2 TD

=== North Carolina ===
North Carolina at NC State

Team	1	2	3	4	Total
Tar Heels	0	7	13	0	20
• Wolfpack	6	20	13	0	39

- Date: November 25, 2023
- Location: Carter–Finley Stadium
  Raleigh, NC
- Game start: 8:00 p.m. EST
- Elapsed time: 3 hours, 22 minutes
- Game attendance: 56,919
- Game weather: 39 °F (4 °C) • Weather: Clear • Wind: NE 3 MPH
- Referee: Adam Savoie
- TV announcers (ACCN): Wes Durham (play-by-play), Tim Hasselbeck (analyst), and Taylor Tannebaum (sideline)

Scoring summary
1	10:35	NSCU	Brayden Narveson 32 yd. field goal (6 plays, 43 yards, 3:15)	NCSU 3–0
1	5:32	NCSU	Brayden Narveson 40 yd. field goal (8 plays, 24 yards, 3:54)	NCSU 6–0
2	12:56	NCSU	KC Concepcion 11 yd. pass from Brennan Armstrong (Brayden Narveson kick) (11 plays, 83 yards, 5:53)	NCSU 13–0
2	10:15	NCSU	KC Concepcion 6 yd. pass from Brennan Armstrong (Brayden Narveson kick) (4 plays, 55 yards, 1:39)	NCSU 20–0
2	5:57	NCSU	Brayden Narveson 28 yd. field goal (7 plays, 46 yards, 2:57)	NCSU 23–0
2	4:34	UNC	John Copenhaver 15 yd. pass from Drake Maye (Noah Burnette kick) (4 plays, 75 yards, 1:23)	NCSU 23–7
2	0:00	NCSU	Brayden Narveson 24 yd. field goal (13 plays, 70 yards, 4:28)	NCSU 26–7
3	10:26	NCSU	Dacari Collins 20 yd. pass from Brennan Armstrong (Brayden Narveson kick) (8 plays, 75 yards, 4:34)	NCSU 33–7
3	8:50	UNC	Drake Maye 1 yd. rush (Noah Burnette kick) (6 plays, 75 yards, 1:36)	NCSU 33–14
3	7:54	NCSU	Delbert Mimms, III 7 yd. rush (Juice Vereen pass from Brennan Armstrong failed) (3 plays, 75 yards, 0:56)	NCSU 39–14
3	5:44	UNC	Tez Walker 0 yd. pass from Drake Maye (John Copenhaver pass from Drake Maye failed) (10 plays, 75 yards, 2:10)	NCSU 39–20

Statistics	UNC	NCSU
First downs	21	27
Total yards	384	504
Rushing yards	130	170
Passing yards	254	334
Turnovers	3	0
Time of possession	19:54	40:06

Team	Category	Player	Statistics
North Carolina	Passing	Drake Maye	22–38, 254 yards, 2 TD, 2 INT
North Carolina	Rushing	Drake Maye	9 rushes, 106 yards, 1 TD
North Carolina	Receiving	John Copenhaver	5 receptions, 64 yards, 1 TD
NC State	Passing	Brennan Armstrong	22–31, 334 yards, 3 TD
NC State	Rushing	KC Concepcion	11 rushes, 55 yards
NC State	Receiving	KC Concepcion	7 receptions, 131 yards, 2 TD

=== Vs. Kansas State–Pop-Tarts Bowl ===
No. 18 NC State vs No. 25 Kansas State

Team	1	2	3	4	Total
No. 18 Wolfpack	0	10	9	0	19
• No. 25 Wildcats	7	14	0	7	28

- Date: December 28, 2023
- Location: Camping World Stadium
  Orlando, FL
- Game start: 5:45 p.m. EST
- Game attendance: 31,111
- Game weather: Cloudy • Temperature: 61 °F (16 °C) • Wind: 7 mph (11 km/h) W
- Referee: Larry Smith
- TV announcers (ESPN): Anish Shroff (play-by-play), Andre Ware (analyst), Paul Carcaterra (sideline)

Scoring summary
1	12:35	KSU	DJ Giddens 37-yard pass from Avery Johnson (Chris Tennant kick) (6 plays, 75 yards, 2:25)	KSU 7–0
2	7:29	KSU	DJ Giddens 4-yard run (Chris Tennant kick) (9 plays, 90 yards, 4:49)	KSU 14–0
2	3:22	NCSU	Brennan Armstrong 31-yard run (Brayden Narveson kick) (9 plays, 76 yards, 4:07)	KSU 14–7
2	0:55	KSU	Avery Johnson 19-yard run (Chris Tennant kick) (10 plays, 75 yards, 2:27)	KSU 21–7
2	0:00	NCSU	Brayden Narveson 26-yard field goal (8 plays, 57 yards, 0:00)	KSU 21–10
3	12:51	NCSU	Brayden Narveson 49-yard field goal (6 plays, 44 yards, 2:09)	KSU 21–13
3	1:50	NCSU	Trent Pennix 60-yard run (two point pass conversion failed) (7 plays, 75 yards, 4:03)	KSU 21–19
4	2:48	KSU	Jayce Brown 11-yard pass from Avery Johnson (Chris Tennant kick) (15 plays, 72 yards, 7:24)	KSU 28–19

Statistics	NCSU	KSU
First downs	17	22
Total yards	399	435
Rushing yards	235	257
Passing yards	164	178
Turnovers	1	0
Time of possession	29:06	30:54

Team	Category	Player	Statistics
NC State	Passing	Brennan Armstrong	14/28, 164 yards, INT
NC State	Rushing	Brennan Armstrong	17 carries, 121 yards, TD
NC State	Receiving	KC Concepcion	7 receptions, 72 yards
Kansas State	Passing	Avery Johnson	14/31, 178 yards, 2 TD
Kansas State	Rushing	DJ Giddens	28 carries, 151 yards, TD
Kansas State	Receiving	Jayce Brown	5 receptions, 52 yards, TD

== Rankings ==
Ranking movements Legend: ██ Increase in ranking ██ Decrease in ranking — = Not ranked RV = Received votes т = Tied with team above or below
	Week															
Poll	Pre	1	2	3	4	5	6	7	8	9	10	11	12	13	14	Final
AP	RV	RV	—	—	—	—	—	—	—	—	RV	RV	RV	21т	19	21
Coaches	RV	RV	—	—	—	—	—	—	—	—	RV	RV	24	20	18	21
CFP	Not released									—	—	—	22	19	18	Not released

== Players drafted into the NFL ==
Round	Pick	Player	Position	NFL Club
3	98	Payton Wilson	LB	Pittsburgh Steelers
6	190	Dylan McMahon	OG	Philadelphia Eagles
