= Jayce Brown =

American football player (born 2005)

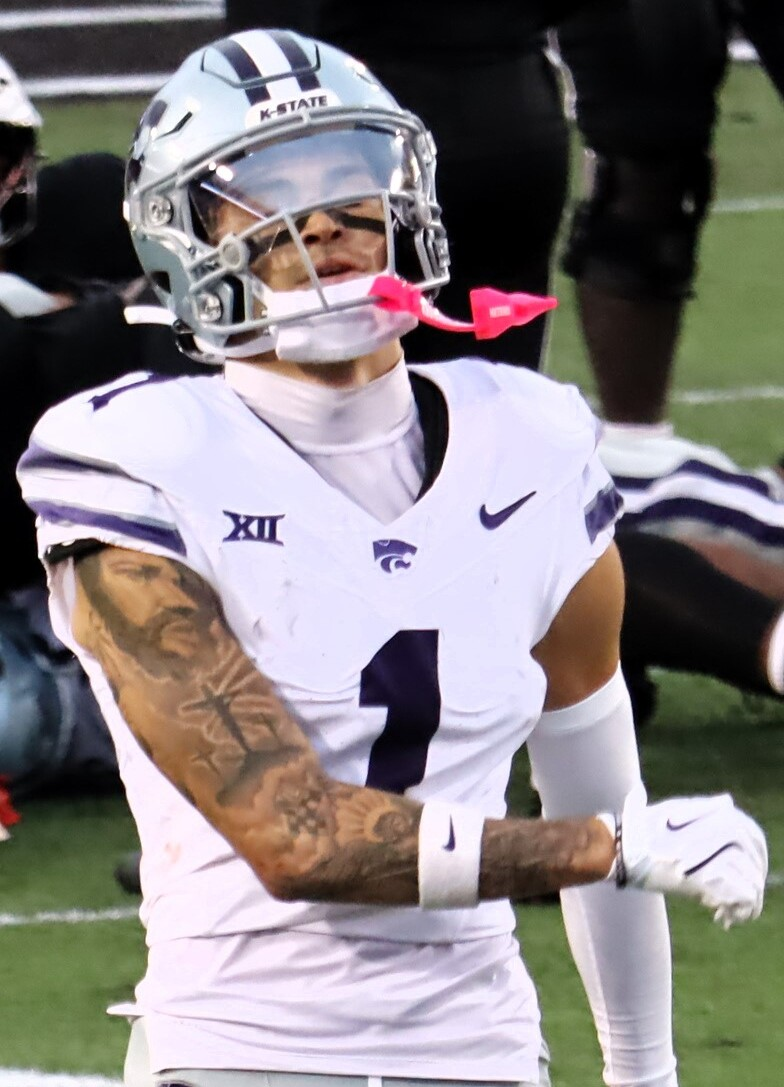
- Brown in 2024

No. 1 – LSU Tigers
- Position: Wide receiver
- Class: Senior

Personal information
- Born: April 30, 2005 (age 21)
- Listed height: 5 ft 11 in (1.80 m)
- Listed weight: 175 lb (79 kg)

Career information
- High school: Choctawhatchee (Fort Walton Beach, Florida)
- College: Kansas State (2023–2025); LSU (2026–present)

Awards and highlights
- Third-team All-Big 12 (2025)
- Stats at ESPN

Jayce Brown (born April 30, 2005) is an American college football wide receiver for the LSU Tigers. He previously played for the Kansas State Wildcats

== Early life ==
Brown attended Choctawhatchee High School in Fort Walton Beach, Florida. He was rated as a three-star recruit and committed to play college football for the Kansas State Wildcats offers from schools such as Tulane, Georgia State, Middle Tennessee, Air Force, and Army.

== College career ==
In week 8 of the 2023 season, Brown hauled in four receptions for 88 yards and his first career touchdown in a 41-3 win over TCU. He made his first start in the 2023 Pop-Tarts Bowl, where me made five catches for 52 yards and a touchdown in a win over NC State. During the 2023 season, Brown appeared in ten games with six starts, where he hauled in 27 receptions for 437 yards and three touchdowns. In week 7 of the 2024 season, he notched six receptions for 121 yards and two touchdowns in a win over Colorado.

=== College statistics ===
Season	Team	GP	Receiving		
Season	Team	GP	Rec	Yds	TD
2023	Kansas State	10	27	437	3
2024	Kansas State	13	47	823	5
2025	Kansas State	13	41	712	5
Career		36	115	1,972	13
