= MJ Morris =

American football player (born 2003)

No. 19 – Texas Longhorns
- Position: Quarterback
- Class: Redshirt Senior

Personal information
- Born: June 30, 2002 (age 24)
- Listed height: 6 ft 1 in (1.85 m)
- Listed weight: 208 lb (94 kg)

Career information
- High school: Carrollton
- College: NC State (2022–2023); Maryland (2024); Coastal Carolina (2025); Texas (2026–present)
- Stats at ESPN

MJ Morris (born June 30, 2002) is an American college football quarterback for the Texas Longhorns. He previously played for the NC State Wolfpack, Maryland Terrapins and Coastal Carolina Chanticleers.

== Early life ==
Morris attended Carrollton High School in Carrollton, Georgia, for his freshman and sophomore year before transferring to Pace Academy in Atlanta, Georgia for his junior year before transferring back to Carrollton for his senior year. As a senior, he passed for 3,089 yards with 33 touchdowns. Morris committed to North Carolina State University to play college football.

== College career ==
=== NC State ===
Morris entered his true freshman year at NC State in 2022 as backup to Devin Leary and Jack Chambers. He earned his first extensive playing time during the team's eighth game against Virginia Tech. Trailing 21–3, Morris replaced Chambers, completing 20 of 29 passes for 265 yards and three touchdowns in the victory. He played four games his sophomore year going 3–1 as a starter and then deciding to redshirt. On November 30, 2023, Morris announced he was entering the transfer portal.

=== Maryland ===
On December 13, 2023, Morris indicated his intent to transfer to the University of Maryland, College Park.

On December 28, 2024, Morris announced that he would enter the transfer portal for the second time.

=== Coastal Carolina ===
On January 7, 2025, Morris announced that he would transfer to Coastal Carolina University.

=== Texas ===
On January 22, 2026, Morris announced that he would transfer to the University of Texas at Austin.

=== Statistics ===
Year	Team	Games			Passing								Rushing			
Year	Team	GP	GS	Record	Comp	Att	Pct	Yards	Avg	TD	Int	Rate	Att	Yards	Avg	TD
2022	NC State	5	3	2−1	52	86	60.5	648	7.5	7	1	148.3	49	88	1.6	1
2023	NC State	4	4	3−1	63	113	55.8	719	6.4	7	5	120.8	32	15	0.5	0
2024	Maryland	7	1	0−1	36	61	59.0	350	5.7	5	5	117.9	28	12	0.4	1
2025	Coastal Carolina	4	2	1−1	35	60	58.3	304	5.1	1	4	93.1	11	31	2.8	0
Career		20	10	6−4	186	320	58.1	2,021	6.3	20	15	122.4	120	146	1.2	2
