= Brennan Armstrong =

American football player (born 1999)

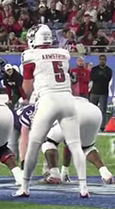
- Armstrong at the 2023 Pop-Tarts Bowl

Profile
- Position: Quarterback

Personal information
- Born: October 18, 1999 (age 27); Shelby, Ohio, U.S.
- Listed height: 6 ft 2 in (1.88 m)
- Listed weight: 215 lb (98 kg)

Career information
- High school: Shelby
- College: Virginia (2018–2022); NC State (2023)
- NFL draft: 2024: undrafted

Career history
- BC Lions (2024)*
- * Offseason or practice squad member only

Awards and highlights
- Dudley Award (2021); Third-team All-ACC (2021)

Brennan Armstrong (born October 18, 1999) is an American professional football quarterback. He was most recently a member of the BC Lions of the Canadian Football League (CFL). He played college football for the NC State Wolfpack. Armstrong attended and played football for Shelby High School in Ohio. He started his career with the Virginia Cavaliers, winning the starting job for his redshirt sophomore season and leading them to a 5–5 record.

As a redshirt junior, Armstrong led Virginia to the Wasabi Fenway Bowl which was canceled due to COVID-19. He is Virginia's all-time leader in career passing yards, total offense, passing touchdowns, consecutive games with a passing touchdown, 200, 300, and 400-yard games, and career pass attempts. He is also their single season leader in passing yards in a season, total offense, passing touchdowns, and passing completions. He also owns three single-game records when he threw for 554 yards and had 538 yards against North Carolina in 2021. Against BYU he tied Virginia's record for single-game touchdowns responsible with six.

== Early life ==
Armstrong attended Shelby High School in Shelby, Ohio, where he was a two-way football player and also played baseball and basketball. In the three seasons prior to Armstrong's arrival, the high school had a 3–27 record, but by his senior year, Armstrong led Shelby to a program best 13-1 record.

College recruiting
Name	Hometown	School	Height	Weight	Commit date
Brennan Armstrong; QB	Shelby, Ohio	Shelby High School	6 ft 2 in (1.88 m)	203 lb (92 kg)	Nov 20, 2017
Brennan Armstrong; QB	Recruit ratings: Scout: Rivals: 247Sports: ESPN:				
Overall recruit ranking: 247Sports: 619
Note: In many cases, Scout, Rivals, 247Sports, On3, and ESPN may conflict in their listings of height and weight.; In these cases, the average was taken. ESPN grades are on a 100-point scale.; Sources: "2018 Team Ranking". Rivals.com.

== College career ==
=== Virginia ===
In Armstrong's true freshman season at the University of Virginia, he appeared in four games for the Cavaliers. He made his college football debut against Richmond in a game where he ran three times for eleven yards while also throwing twice, completing once, and throwing for six yards. He also played sparingly against Louisville in the team's ACC opener. In that game he ran for fifty yards including a 34 yard run in the second quarter. In a game against Georgia Tech he led the offense after starting quarterback Bryce Perkins went down with an injury. He completed one of his two pass attempts going for a 56 yard touchdown for the first of his career to wide receiver Joe Reed. He also made an appearance in the team's bowl game against South Carolina in the 2018 Belk Bowl. Due to the new NCAA rules, he retained his redshirt for the season.

In Armstrong's redshirt freshman season, he appeared in seven games. He missed five games against Florida State, Old Dominion, Notre Dame, and Miami due to an injury. In a game against Pittsburgh he appeared on punt coverage. In a game against FCS opponent William & Mary he went nine of ten for 103 yards. He completed one pass against North Carolina on a fake field goal to Tanner Cowley for five yards that led to a touchdown. He also threw his second career touchdown in a win against Liberty where he went three of four for 73 yards.

==== 2020 ====
In Armstrong's redshirt sophomore season, he was named as one of Virginia's four team captains along with Richard Burney, Terrell Jana, and Charles Snowden. He had an FBS leading six games with 200+ passing yard and 45+ rushing yard games, he also had an FBS leading four games with both those stat lines and also including both a rushing and passing touchdown. He finished the year third in the ACC and eighteenth in the nation with 296.6 yards of total offense per game and was eighth among non-option quarterbacks with 552 rushing yards. He started nine of ten games for Virginia. He became just the second left-handed quarterback since Jameel Sewell to start a game for the Cavaliers. Armstrong made his first start against Duke in a game where he threw for 269 yards and two touchdowns in a 38–20 win, his 269 yards would be good enough for second all-time for a quarterback making their first start with the team. In the fourth quarter the team was down by three, he would then go eight of nine for 144 yards and two touchdowns to secure the win and the fourth quarter comeback. He then made history again joining Matt Blundin when he threw for 270 passing yards against No. 1 Clemson where he became the second UVA quarterback to throw for 200+ yards in their first two career starts. In that game he also threw for three touchdowns and ran for a team-best 89 yards which made him the only player since 2000 to pass for 225+ yards, rush for 70+ yards, and throw for 3+ touchdowns against Clemson despite Virginia losing 23–41. Armstrong was knocked out of the game in the second quarter against NC State with a concussion. Prior to his injury he went six of nine for 57 yards, the team ended up losing 21–38 in his absence. He would also miss their next game against Wake Forest due to the injury. Against No. 11 Miami, he threw for 181 yards and two touchdowns and rushed for 91 yards in a narrow 14–19 loss. The next week against No. 15 North Carolina, Armstrong led the team to an upset win in which he threw for 208 yards and an additional three touchdowns in the 44–41 victory. He led the team to five straight wins including their win over Miami and North Carolina along with Louisville 31–17, Abilene Christian 55–15, and Boston College 43–32. In the games against Abilene Christian and Boston College he became the first Virginia quarterback to have 400+ yards of total offense in back-to-back games. The team's game against Florida State was postponed following positive COVID-19 tests at FSU. The team would finish of the year with a 15–33 loss to Virginia Tech, in that game Armstrong threw for 259 yards and two touchdowns.

==== 2021 ====
In Armstrong's redshirt junior season, he was once again voted as team captain alongside Mandy Alonso, Nick Jackson, and Wayne Taulapapa. He became the first two-time team captain since Micah Kiser and the second under Bronco Mendenhall. In the season-opener against William & Mary he passed for the most yards in UVA history in a season-opener with 339 yards. In a game against Illinois he threw for a career-high five touchdown passes alongside 405 passing yards, becoming the fourth Virginia quarterback to throw for 400 yards in a game and the second to reach that feat and also throw for five touchdowns. Against North Carolina, Armstrong set another Virginia record when he threw for 554 yards against the Tar Heels, which at the time was also the highest of the season up to that point. In three-straight games against Illinois, North Carolina, and Wake Forest he became the first Virginia quarterback to throw for 400 yards in three-straight games. Following a 30–28 win over Miami, Armstrong threw for 487 passing yards while erasing a seventeen-point fourth-quarter deficit in a 34–33 win over Louisville. In a game against BYU he suffered an injury after accounting for a total of six touchdowns in the team's 49–66 loss. In that game he broke the school's record for passing yards with an eight-yard completion to tight end Jelani Woods. He also broke the record for 300-yard passing games with his ninth of his career, passing Matt Schaub's eight games. The team would lose the final four games of the season, as Armstrong was injured, to Notre Dame 3–28, Armstrong returned for the team's game against Pittsburgh 38–48, and Virginia Tech 24–29 to finish at an even 6–6. Virginia was scheduled to play SMU in the Wasabi Fenway Bowl but was ultimately cancelled due to COVID-19 within Virginia. After the season he won the Dudley Award.

==== 2022 ====
In Armstrong's redshirt senior season, he started all ten games for the Cavaliers. He finished the year fifth in both total offense per game (258.1) and passing yards per game (221.0). In the team's season-opener against Richmond, him and teammate Perris Jones became just the second Cavalier duo to reach 100 yards in a season-opener. On a 64-yard touchdown run he broke the school's all-time career total offense record, it was also the sixth-longest run by a UVA quarterback. His school-record eighteen-straight games with a touchdown came to an end against Illinois where the team could only score three points. The next week he broke the school's career passing yards record with a seventeen yard completion to Lavel Davis Jr. Two weeks later he broke another one of Schaub's records as he threw for his 21st 200-yard game against Duke despite the team's loss. The next week the team lost again to Louisville, but Armstrong had 12th 300-yard game of his career and tied Virginia's career touchdown record on a 40-yard passing touchdown to Dontayvion Wicks. The next week against Georgia Tech he broke the record, this time on a 44-yard pass to Wicks again, he also became the ACC's leader in passing yards by a left-handed quarterback with 9,034 and was good enough for twelfth most all-time in FBS history. Following the 2022 University of Virginia shooting that resulted in the death of three students and players, Virginia did not play their final two games against Coastal Carolina and Virginia Tech.

=== NC State ===
On January 7, 2023, Armstrong transferred to North Carolina State University.

=== Virginia records ===
Held the following Virginia records:

Career records

- Career passing yards: 9,034
- Career total offense: 10,301
- Career passing touchdowns: 58
- Consecutive games with a passing touchdown: 18 (2021-2022)
- 200-yard career passing games: 25
- 300-yard career passing games: 12
- 400-yard career passing games: 6
- Career pass attempts: 1,131

Season records

- Passing yards in a season: 4,449 (2021)
- Total offense in a season: 4,700 (2021)
- Passing touchdowns in a season: 31 (2021)
- Passing completions in a season: 326 (2021)
- 2nd passing attempts in a season: 500 (2021)

Single-game records

- Passing yards in a game: 554 (vs. UNC 2021)
- Total offense in a game: 538 (vs. UNC 2021)
- T-2nd passing touchdowns in a game: 5 (vs. Illinois)
- T-1st touchdowns responsible for: 6 (vs. BYU 2021)

=== Statistics ===
Year	Team	Games			Passing								Rushing			
Year	Team	GP	GS	Record	Comp	Att	Pct	Yards	Avg	TD	Int	Rate	Att	Yards	Avg	TD
2018	Virginia	4	0	0–0	2	5	40.0	62	12.4	1	0	210.2	9	74	8.2	0
2019	Virginia	7	0	0–0	15	20	75.0	196	9.8	1	2	153.8	7	19	2.7	0
2020	Virginia	9	9	5–4	157	268	58.6	2,117	7.9	18	11	138.9	126	552	4.4	5
2021	Virginia	11	11	6–5	326	500	65.2	4,449	8.9	31	10	156.4	98	251	2.6	9
2022	Virginia	10	10	3–7	185	338	54.7	2,210	6.5	7	12	109.4	123	371	3.0	6
2023	NC State	6	5	3–2	94	160	58.8	971	6.1	5	6	112.5	70	281	4.0	3
Career		47	35	17−18	779	1,291	60.3	10,005	7.7	63	41	135.2	433	1,548	3.6	23

== Professional career ==
In 2024, Armstrong participated in the Kansas City Chiefs rookie minicamp as a tryout player. On May 10, 2024, the Jacksonville Jaguars announced Armstrong would participate in their rookie camp as a tryout player.

Armstrong was signed to the practice roster of the BC Lions on August 8, 2024. Following the signing of Nathan Rourke, Armstrong was released on August 14.
