= 2023 NCAA Division I FBS football rankings =

- Season: 2023
- Bowl season: 2023–24 bowl games
- Preseason No. 1: Georgia
- End of season champions: Michigan
- Conference with most teams in final AP poll: SEC (6)

Two human polls and a committee's selections comprise the 2023 National Collegiate Athletic Association (NCAA) Division I Football Bowl Subdivision (FBS) football rankings, in addition to various publications' preseason polls. Unlike most sports, college football's governing body, the NCAA, does not bestow a national championship at the FBS level. Instead, that title is bestowed by one or more different polling agencies. There are two main weekly polls that begin in the preseason—the AP Poll and the Coaches Poll. One additional poll, the College Football Playoff (CFP) ranking, is usually released starting midway through the season. The CFP rankings determine who makes the four-team playoff that determines the College Football Playoff National Champion.

== Legend ==
	Increase in ranking
	Decrease in ranking
	Not ranked previous week
	Selected for College Football Playoff
(#–#)	Win–loss record
(Italics)	Number of first place votes

== AP Poll ==
	Preseason Aug 14	Week 1 Sep 5	Week 2 Sep 10	Week 3 Sep 17	Week 4 Sep 24	Week 5 Oct 1	Week 6 Oct 8	Week 7 Oct 15	Week 8 Oct 22	Week 9 Oct 29	Week 10 Nov 5	Week 11 Nov 12	Week 12 Nov 19	Week 13 Nov 26	Week 14 Dec 3	Week 15 (Final) Jan 9	
1.	Georgia (60)	Georgia (1–0) (58)	Georgia (2–0) (55)	Georgia (3–0) (57)	Georgia (4–0) (55)	Georgia (5–0) (35)	Georgia (6–0) (50)	Georgia (7–0) (43)	Georgia (7–0) (38)	Georgia (8–0) (48)	Georgia (9–0) (49)	Georgia (10–0) (54)	Georgia (11–0) (61)	Georgia (12–0) (52)	Michigan (13–0) (51)	Michigan (15–0) (61)	1.
2.	Michigan (2)	Michigan (1–0) (2)	Michigan (2–0) (2)	Michigan (3–0) (2)	Michigan (4–0) (1)	Michigan (5–0) (12)	Michigan (6–0) (11)	Michigan (7–0) (16)	Michigan (8–0) (19)	Michigan (8–0) (9)	Michigan (9–0) (9)	Michigan (10–0) (7)	Ohio State (11–0) (1)	Michigan (12–0) (10)	Washington (13–0) (11)	Washington (14–1)	2.
3.	Ohio State (1)	Alabama (1–0)	Florida State (2–0) (3)	Texas (3–0) (3)	Texas (4–0) (2)	Texas (5–0) (10)	Ohio State (5–0) (1)	Ohio State (6–0) (1)	Ohio State (7–0) (3)	Ohio State (8–0) (3)	Ohio State (9–0) (3)	Ohio State (10–0) (1)	Michigan (11–0)	Washington (12–0)	Texas (12–1)	Texas (12–2)	3.
4.	Alabama	Florida State (1–0) (3)	Texas (2–0) (2)	Florida State (3–0) (1)	Ohio State (4–0) (1)	Ohio State (4–0) (1)	Florida State (5–0) (1)	Florida State (6–0) (1)	Florida State (7–0) (3)	Florida State (8–0) (3)	Florida State (9–0) (2)	Florida State (10–0)	Washington (11–0)	Florida State (12–0)	Florida State (13–0)	Georgia (13–1)	4.
5.	LSU	Ohio State (1–0)	USC (3–0)	USC (3–0)	Florida State (4–0) (3)	Florida State (4–0) (4)	Oklahoma (6–0)	Washington (6–0) (2)	Washington (7–0)	Washington (8–0)	Washington (9–0)	Washington (10–0)	Florida State (11–0)	Oregon (11–1)	Alabama (12–1)	Alabama (12–2)	5.
6.	USC	USC (2–0)	Ohio State (2–0)	Ohio State (3–0)	Penn State (4–0)	Penn State (5–0)	Penn State (5–0)	Oklahoma (6–0)	Oklahoma (7–0)	Oregon (7–1)	Oregon (8–1)	Oregon (9–1)	Oregon (10–1)	Ohio State (11–1)	Georgia (12–1)	Oregon (12–2) т	6.
7.	Penn State	Penn State (1–0)	Penn State (2–0)	Penn State (3–0)	Washington (4–0) (1)	Washington (5–0)	Washington (5–0)	Penn State (6–0)	Texas (6–1)	Texas (7–1)	Texas (8–1)	Texas (9–1)	Texas (10–1)	Texas (11–1)	Ohio State (11–1)	Florida State (13–1) т	7.
8.	Florida State	Washington (1–0)	Washington (2–0)	Washington (3–0)	USC (4–0)	Oregon (5–0)	Oregon (5–0)	Texas (5–1)	Oregon (6–1)	Alabama (7–1)	Alabama (8–1)	Alabama (9–1)	Alabama (10–1)	Alabama (11–1)	Oregon (11–2)	Missouri (11–2)	8.
9.	Clemson	Tennessee (1–0)	Notre Dame (3–0)	Notre Dame (4–0)	Oregon (4–0)	USC (5–0)	Texas (5–1)	Oregon (5–1)	Alabama (7–1)	Penn State (7–1)	Penn State (8–1)	Louisville (9–1)	Louisville (10–1)	Missouri (10–2)	Missouri (10–2)	Ole Miss (11–2)	9.
10.	Washington	Notre Dame (2–0)	Alabama (1–1)	Oregon (3–0)	Utah (4–0)	Notre Dame (5–1)	USC (6–0)	North Carolina (6–0)	Penn State (6–1)	Oklahoma (7–1)	Ole Miss (8–1)	Oregon State (8–2)	Missouri (9–2)	Penn State (10–2)	Penn State (10–2)	Ohio State (11–2)	10.
11.	Texas	Texas (1–0)	Tennessee (2–0)	Utah (3–0)	Notre Dame (4–1)	Alabama (4–1)	Alabama (5–1)	Alabama (6–1)	Oregon State (6–1)	Ole Miss (7–1)	Louisville (8–1)	Missouri (8–2)	Penn State (9–2)	Ole Miss (10–2)	Ole Miss (10–2)	Arizona (10–3)	11.
12.	Tennessee	Utah (1–0)	Utah (2–0)	LSU (2–1)	Alabama (3–1)	Oklahoma (5–0)	North Carolina (5–0)	Oregon State (6–1)	Ole Miss (6–1)	Notre Dame (7–2)	Oregon State (7–2)	Penn State (8–2)	Ole Miss (9–2)	Oklahoma (10–2)	Oklahoma (10–2)	LSU (10–3)	12.
13.	Notre Dame	Oregon (1–0)	Oregon (2–0)	Alabama (2–1)	LSU (3–1)	Washington State (4–0)	Ole Miss (5–1)	Ole Miss (5–1)	Utah (6–1)	LSU (6–2)	Utah (7–2)	Ole Miss (8–2)	Oklahoma (9–2)	LSU (9–3)	LSU (9–3)	Penn State (10–3)	13.
14.	Utah	LSU (0–1)	LSU (1–1)	Oregon State (3–0)	Oklahoma (4–0)	North Carolina (4–0)	Louisville (6–0)	Utah (5–1)	Notre Dame (6–2)	Missouri (7–1)	Tennessee (7–2)	Oklahoma (8–2)	LSU (8–3)	Arizona (9–3)	Arizona (9–3)	Notre Dame (10–3)	14.
15.	Oregon	Kansas State (1–0)	Kansas State (2–0)	Ole Miss (3–0)	North Carolina (4–0)	Oregon State (4–1)	Oregon State (5–1)	Notre Dame (6–2)	LSU (6–2)	Louisville (7–1)	Oklahoma State (7–2)	LSU (7–3)	Oregon State (8–3)	Louisville (10–2)	Notre Dame (9–3)	Oklahoma (10–3)	15.
16.	Kansas State	Oregon State (1–0)	Oregon State (2–0)	Oklahoma (3–0)	Washington State (4–0)	Ole Miss (4–1)	Utah (4–1)	Duke (5–1)	Missouri (7–1)	Oregon State (6–2)	Missouri (7–2)	Utah (7–3)	Arizona (8–3)	Notre Dame (9–3)	Louisville (10–3)	Oklahoma State (10–4)	16.
17.	TCU	North Carolina (1–0)	Ole Miss (2–0)	North Carolina (3–0)	Duke (4–0)	Miami (FL) (4–0)	Duke (4–1)	Tennessee (5–1)	North Carolina (6–1)	Air Force (8–0)	Oklahoma (7–2)	Tulane (9–1)	Notre Dame (8–3)	Tulane (11–1)	SMU (11–2)	Tennessee (9–4)	17.
18.	Oregon State	Oklahoma (1–0)	Colorado (2–0)	Duke (3–0)	Miami (FL) (4–0)	Utah (4–1)	UCLA (4–1)	USC (6–1)	Louisville (6–1)	Utah (6–2)	LSU (6–3)	James Madison (10–0)	Tulane (10–1)	Iowa (10–2)	Liberty (13–0)	Kansas State (9–4)	18.
19.	Wisconsin	Wisconsin (1–0)	Oklahoma (2–0)	Colorado (3–0)	Oregon State (3–1)	Duke (4–1)	Washington State (4–1)	LSU (5–2)	Air Force (7–0)	Tennessee (6–2)	Kansas (7–2)	Arizona (7–3)	Kansas State (8–3)	Oklahoma State (9–3)	NC State (9–3)	Louisville (10–4)	19.
20.	Oklahoma	Ole Miss (1–0)	North Carolina (2–0)	Miami (FL) (3–0)	Ole Miss (3–1)	Kentucky (5–0)	Tennessee (4–1)	Missouri (6–1)	Duke (5–2)	UCLA (6–2)	Tulane (8–1)	Notre Dame (7–3)	Iowa (9–2)	Liberty (12–0)	Iowa (10–3)	Clemson (9–4)	20.
21.	North Carolina	Duke (1–0)	Duke (2–0)	Washington State (3–0)	Tennessee (3–1)	Missouri (5–0)	Notre Dame (5–2)	Louisville (6–1)	Tennessee (5–2)	Tulane (7–1)	James Madison (9–0)	Tennessee (7–3)	Oklahoma State (8–3)	NC State (9–3) т	Oregon State (8–4)	NC State (9–4)	21.
22.	Ole Miss	Colorado (1–0)	Miami (FL) (2–0)	UCLA (3–0)	Florida (3–1)	Tennessee (4–1)	LSU (4–2)	Air Force (6–0)	Tulane (6–1)	Kansas (6–2)	Notre Dame (7–3)	North Carolina (8–2)	Liberty (11–0)	Oregon State (8–4) т	Oklahoma State (9–4)	SMU (11–3)	22.
23.	Texas A&M	Texas A&M (1–0)	Washington State (2–0)	Tennessee (2–1)	Missouri (4–0)	LSU (3–2)	Kansas (5–1)	Tulane (5–1)	UCLA (5–2)	James Madison (8–0)	Arizona (6–3)	Kansas State (7–3)	Toledo (10–1)	Toledo (11–1)	Tulane (11–2)	Kansas (9–4)	23.
24.	Tulane	Tulane (1–0)	UCLA (2–0)	Iowa (3–0)	Kansas (4–0)	Fresno State (5–0)	Kentucky (5–1)	Iowa (6–1)	USC (6–2)	USC (7–2)	North Carolina (7–2)	Oklahoma State (7–3)	James Madison (10–1)	James Madison (11–1)	James Madison (11–1)	Iowa (10–4)	24.
25.	Iowa	Clemson (0–1)	Iowa (2–0)	Florida (2–1)	Fresno State (4–0)	Louisville (5–0)	Miami (FL) (4–1)	UCLA (4–2)	James Madison (7–0)	Kansas State (6–2)	Liberty (9–0)	Liberty (10–0)	Tennessee (7–4)	SMU (10–2)	Tennessee (8–4)	Liberty (13–1)	25.
	Preseason Aug 14	Week 1 Sep 5	Week 2 Sep 10	Week 3 Sep 17	Week 4 Sep 24	Week 5 Oct 1	Week 6 Oct 8	Week 7 Oct 15	Week 8 Oct 22	Week 9 Oct 29	Week 10 Nov 5	Week 11 Nov 12	Week 12 Nov 19	Week 13 Nov 26	Week 14 Dec 3	Week 15 (Final) Jan 9	
		Dropped: TCU (0–1); Iowa (1–0)	Dropped: Wisconsin (1–1); Texas A&M (1–1); Tulane (1–1); Clemson (1–1)	Dropped: Kansas State (2–1)	Dropped: Colorado (3–1); UCLA (3–1); Iowa (3–1)	Dropped: Florida (3–2); Kansas (4–1)	Dropped: Missouri (5–1); Fresno State (5–1)	Dropped: Washington State (4–2); Kansas (5–2); Kentucky (5–2); Miami (FL) (4–2)	Dropped: Iowa (6–2)	Dropped: North Carolina (6–2); Duke (5–3)	Dropped: Air Force (8–1); UCLA (6–3); USC (7–3); Kansas State (6–3)	Dropped: Kansas (7–3)	Dropped: Utah (7–4); North Carolina (8–3)	Dropped: Kansas State (8–4); Tennessee (8–4)	Dropped: Toledo (11–2)	Dropped: Oregon State (8–5); Tulane (11–3); James Madison (11–2)	

== Coaches Poll ==
	Preseason Aug 7	Week 1 Sep 5	Week 2 Sep 10	Week 3 Sep 17	Week 4 Sep 24	Week 5 Oct 1	Week 6 Oct 8	Week 7 Oct 15	Week 8 Oct 22	Week 9 Oct 29	Week 10 Nov 5	Week 11 Nov 12	Week 12 Nov 19	Week 13 Nov 26	Week 14 Dec 3	Week 15 (Final) Jan 9	
1.	Georgia (61)	Georgia (1–0) (63)	Georgia (2–0) (64)	Georgia (3–0) (62)	Georgia (4–0) (61)	Georgia (5–0) (59)	Georgia (6–0) (61)	Georgia (7–0) (58)	Georgia (7–0) (58)	Georgia (8–0) (58)	Georgia (9–0) (55)	Georgia (10–0) (58)	Georgia (11–0) (61)	Georgia (12–0) (59)	Michigan (13–0) (51)	Michigan (15–0) (63)	1.
2.	Michigan	Michigan (1–0) (1)	Michigan (2–0) (2)	Michigan (3–0) (1)	Michigan (4–0)	Michigan (5–0) (1)	Michigan (6–0)	Michigan (7–0) (4)	Michigan (8–0) (4)	Michigan (8–0) (3)	Michigan (9–0) (4)	Michigan (10–0) (3)	Ohio State (11–0) (1)	Michigan (12–0) (4)	Washington (13–0) (8)	Washington (14–1)	2.
3.	Alabama (4)	Alabama (1–0) (2)	Florida State (2–0)	Florida State (3–0)	Ohio State (4–0) (2)	Ohio State (4–0) (2)	Ohio State (5–0) (2)	Ohio State (6–0) (1)	Ohio State (7–0) (2)	Ohio State (8–0) (3)	Ohio State (9–0) (5)	Ohio State (10–0) (3)	Michigan (11–0) (1)	Washington (12–0)	Florida State (13–0)	Georgia (13–1)	3.
4.	Ohio State (1)	Ohio State (1–0)	Ohio State (2–0)	Ohio State (3–0) (1)	Florida State (4–0)	Texas (5–0) (1)	Florida State (5–0)	Florida State (6–0)	Florida State (7–0)	Florida State (8–0)	Florida State (9–0)	Florida State (10–0)	Florida State (11–0)	Florida State (12–0)	Texas (12–1) т	Texas (12–2)	4.
5.	LSU	Florida State (1–0)	USC (3–0)	USC (3–0)	Texas (4–0)	Florida State (4–0)	Penn State (5–0)	Washington (6–0)	Washington (7–0)	Washington (8–0)	Washington (9–0)	Washington (10–0)	Washington (11–0)	Oregon (11–1)	Alabama (12–1) т (3)	Alabama (12–2)	5.
6.	USC	USC (2–0)	Texas (2–0)	Texas (3–0)	USC (4–0)	Penn State (5–0)	Washington (5–0) (1)	Penn State (6–0)	Oklahoma (7–0)	Texas (7–1)	Oregon (8–1)	Oregon (9–1)	Oregon (10–1)	Ohio State (11–1)	Georgia (12–1)	Florida State (13–1)	6.
7.	Penn State	Penn State (1–0)	Penn State (2–0)	Penn State (3–0)	Penn State (4–0)	USC (5–0)	Oklahoma (6–0)	Oklahoma (6–0)	Texas (6–1)	Oregon (7–1)	Texas (8–1)	Texas (9–1)	Texas (10–1)	Texas (11–1)	Ohio State (11–1)	Oregon (12–2)	7.
8.	Florida State	Washington (1–0)	Washington (2–0)	Washington (3–0)	Washington (4–0) (1)	Washington (5–0) (1)	Oregon (5–0)	Texas (5–1) т	Alabama (7–1)	Alabama (7–1)	Alabama (8–1)	Alabama (9–1)	Alabama (10–1)	Alabama (11–1)	Oregon (11–2)	Missouri (11–2)	8.
9.	Clemson	Tennessee (1–0)	Tennessee (2–0)	Notre Dame (4–0)	Oregon (4–0)	Oregon (5–0)	USC (6–0)	Alabama (6–1) т	Oregon (6–1)	Penn State (7–1)	Penn State (8–1)	Louisville (9–1)	Louisville (10–1)	Missouri (10–2)	Missouri (10–2)	Ole Miss (11–2)	9.
10.	Tennessee	Texas (1–0)	Alabama (1–1)	Utah (3–0)	Utah (4–0)	Alabama (4–1)	Alabama (5–1)	North Carolina (6–0)	Penn State (6–1)	Ole Miss (7–1)	Ole Miss (8–1)	Oregon State (8–2)	Missouri (9–2)	Penn State (10–2)	Penn State (10–2)	Ohio State (11–2)	10.
11.	Washington	Notre Dame (2–0)	Notre Dame (3–0)	Oregon (3–0)	Alabama (3–1)	Notre Dame (5–1)	Texas (5–1)	Oregon (5–1)	Ole Miss (6–1)	Oklahoma (7–1)	Louisville (8–1)	Missouri (8–2)	Penn State (9–2)	Ole Miss (10–2)	Ole Miss (10–2)	Arizona (10–3)	11.
12.	Texas	Utah (1–0)	Utah (2–0)	Alabama (2–1)	LSU (3–1)	Oklahoma (5–0)	North Carolina (5–0)	Ole Miss (5–1)	Oregon State (6–1)	Notre Dame (7–2)	Tennessee (7–2)	Penn State (8–2)	Ole Miss (9–2)	Oklahoma (10–2)	Oklahoma (10–2)	LSU (10–3)	12.
13.	Notre Dame	Oregon (1–0)	Oregon (2–0)	LSU (2–1)	Notre Dame (4–1)	North Carolina (4–0)	Ole Miss (5–1)	Oregon State (6–1)	Utah (6–1)	LSU (6–2)	Oregon State (7–2)	Oklahoma (8–2)	Oklahoma (9–2)	LSU (10–2)	LSU (9–3)	Penn State (10–3)	13.
14.	Utah	LSU (0–1)	LSU (1–1)	Oklahoma (3–0)	Oklahoma (4–0)	Washington State (4–0)	Oregon State (5–1)	Utah (5–1)	Notre Dame (6–2)	Missouri (7–1)	Utah (7–2)	Ole Miss (8–2)	LSU (8–3)	Louisville (10–2)	Arizona (9–3)	Notre Dame (10–3)	14.
15.	Oregon	Kansas State (1–0)	Kansas State (2–0)	Oregon State (3–0)	North Carolina (4–0)	Ole Miss (4–1)	Louisville (6–0)	Tennessee (5–1)	LSU (6–2)	Louisville (7–1)	Missouri (7–2)	LSU (7–3)	Oregon State (8–3)	Arizona (9–3)	Louisville (10–3)	Oklahoma (10–3)	15.
16.	TCU	North Carolina (1–0)	Oklahoma (2–0)	Ole Miss (3–0)	Duke (4–0)	Oregon State (4–1)	Utah (4–1)	USC (6–1)	Missouri (7–1)	Tennessee (6–2)	Oklahoma (7–2)	Utah (7–3)	Arizona (8–3)	Notre Dame (9–3)	Notre Dame (9–3)	Oklahoma State (10–4)	16.
17.	Kansas State	Oklahoma (1–0)	Oregon State (2–0)	North Carolina (3–0)	Washington State (4–0)	Miami (FL) (4–0)	Tennessee (4–1)	Duke (5–1)	North Carolina (6–1)	Air Force (8–0)	Oklahoma State (7–2)	Tulane (9–1)	Notre Dame (8–3)	Iowa (10–2)	Iowa (10–3)	Tennessee (9–4)	17.
18.	Oregon State	Oregon State (1–0)	North Carolina (2–0)	Duke (3–0)	Miami (FL) (4–0)	Tennessee (4–1)	Duke (4–1)	Notre Dame (6–2)	Louisville (6–1)	Utah (6–2)	Kansas (7–2)	Notre Dame (7–3)	Tulane (10–1)	Tulane (11–1)	NC State (9–3)	Louisville (10–4)	18.
19.	Oklahoma	Wisconsin (1–0)	Ole Miss (2–0)	Colorado (3–0)	Tennessee (3–1)	Utah (4–1)	Washington State (4–1)	LSU (5–2)	Air Force (7–0)	Oregon State (6–2)	LSU (6–3)	Tennessee (7–3)	Iowa (9–2)	Oklahoma State (9–3)	SMU (11–2)	Kansas State (9–4)	19.
20.	North Carolina	Ole Miss (1–0)	Duke (2–0)	Tennessee (2–1)	Ole Miss (3–1)	Kentucky (5–0)	LSU (4–2)	Missouri (6–1)	Tennessee (5–2)	UCLA (6–2)	Tulane (8–1)	North Carolina (8–2)	Kansas State (8–3)	NC State (9–3)	Liberty (13–0)	Clemson (9–4)	20.
21.	Wisconsin	Clemson (0–1)	Colorado (2–0)	Miami (FL) (3–0)	Oregon State (3–1)	Duke (4–1)	Notre Dame (5–2)	Louisville (6–1)	Duke (5–2)	Tulane (7–1)	James Madison (9–0)	James Madison (10–0)	Oklahoma State (8–3)	Oregon State (8–4)	Oklahoma State (9–4)	NC State (9–4)	21.
22.	Ole Miss	Tulane (1–0)	Clemson (1–1)	Iowa (3–0)	Missouri (4–0)	Missouri (5–0)	UCLA (4–1)	Air Force (6–0)	USC (6–2)	USC (7–2)	Notre Dame (7–3)	Arizona (7–3)	Liberty (11–0)	Liberty (12–0)	Oregon State (8–4)	Iowa (10–4)	22.
23.	Tulane	Texas A&M (1–0)	Miami (FL) (2–0)	Clemson (2–1)	Florida (3–1)	LSU (3–2)	Kentucky (5–1)	Iowa (6–1)	Tulane (6–1)	Kansas (6–2)	North Carolina (7–2)	Iowa (8–2)	Tennessee (7–4)	Tennessee (8–4)	Tennessee (8–4)	Kansas (9–4)	23.
24.	Texas Tech	Duke (1–0)	Iowa (2–0)	Washington State (3–0)	Kansas (4–0)	Fresno State (5–0)	Kansas (5–1)	Tulane (5–1)	UCLA (5–2)	James Madison (8–0)	Arizona (6–3)	Kansas State (7–3)	NC State (8–3)	SMU (10–2)	Tulane (11–2)	SMU (11–3)	24.
25.	Texas A&M	Colorado (1–0)	UCLA (2–0)	UCLA (3–0)	Kansas State (3–1)	Louisville (5–0)	Missouri (5–1)	UCLA (4–2)	James Madison (7–0)	North Carolina (6–2)	Fresno State (8–1)	Oklahoma State (7–3)	SMU (9–2)	James Madison (11–1)	James Madison (11–1)	West Virginia (9–4)	25.
	Preseason Aug 7	Week 1 Sep 5	Week 2 Sep 10	Week 3 Sep 17	Week 4 Sep 24	Week 5 Oct 1	Week 6 Oct 8	Week 7 Oct 15	Week 8 Oct 22	Week 9 Oct 29	Week 10 Nov 5	Week 11 Nov 12	Week 12 Nov 19	Week 13 Nov 26	Week 14 Dec 3	Week 15 (Final) Jan 9	
		Dropped: TCU (0–1); Texas Tech (0–1)	Dropped: Wisconsin (1–1); Tulane (1–1); Texas A&M (1–1)	Dropped: Kansas State (2–1)	Dropped: Colorado (3–1); Iowa (3–1); Clemson (2–2); UCLA (3–1)	Dropped: Florida (3–2); Kansas (4–1); Kansas State (3–1)	Dropped: Miami (FL) (4–1); Fresno State (5–1)	Dropped: Washington State (4–2); Kentucky (5–2); Kansas (5–2)	Dropped: Iowa (6–2)	Dropped: Duke (5–3)	Dropped: Air Force (8–1); UCLA (6–3); USC (7–3)	Dropped: Kansas (7–3); Fresno State (8–2)	Dropped: Utah (7–4); North Carolina (8–3); James Madison (10–1)	Dropped: Kansas State (8–4)	None	Dropped: Liberty (13–1); Oregon State (8–5); Tulane (11–3); James Madison (11–2)	

== CFP rankings ==
	Week 9 Oct 31	Week 10 Nov 7	Week 11 Nov 14	Week 12 Nov 21	Week 13 Nov 28	Week 14 (Final) Dec 3	
1.	Ohio State (8–0)	Ohio State (9–0)	Georgia (10–0)	Georgia (11–0)	Georgia (12–0)	Michigan (13–0)	1.
2.	Georgia (8–0)	Georgia (9–0)	Ohio State (10–0)	Ohio State (11–0)	Michigan (12–0)	Washington (13–0)	2.
3.	Michigan (8–0)	Michigan (9–0)	Michigan (10–0)	Michigan (11–0)	Washington (12–0)	Texas (12–1)	3.
4.	Florida State (8–0)	Florida State (9–0)	Florida State (10–0)	Washington (11–0)	Florida State (12–0)	Alabama (12–1)	4.
5.	Washington (8–0)	Washington (9–0)	Washington (10–0)	Florida State (11–0)	Oregon (11–1)	Florida State (13–0)	5.
6.	Oregon (7–1)	Oregon (8–1)	Oregon (9–1)	Oregon (10–1)	Ohio State (11–1)	Georgia (12–1)	6.
7.	Texas (7–1)	Texas (8–1)	Texas (9–1)	Texas (10–1)	Texas (11–1)	Ohio State (11–1)	7.
8.	Alabama (7–1)	Alabama (8–1)	Alabama (9–1)	Alabama (10–1)	Alabama (11–1)	Oregon (11–2)	8.
9.	Oklahoma (7–1)	Ole Miss (8–1)	Missouri (8–2)	Missouri (9–2)	Missouri (10–2)	Missouri (10–2)	9.
10.	Ole Miss (7–1)	Penn State (8–1)	Louisville (9–1)	Louisville (10–1)	Penn State (10–2)	Penn State (10–2)	10.
11.	Penn State (7–1)	Louisville (8–1)	Oregon State (8–2)	Penn State (9–2)	Ole Miss (10–2)	Ole Miss (10–2)	11.
12.	Missouri (7–1)	Oregon State (7–2)	Penn State (8–2)	Ole Miss (9–2)	Oklahoma (10–2)	Oklahoma (10–2)	12.
13.	Louisville (7–1)	Tennessee (7–2)	Ole Miss (8–2)	Oklahoma (9–2)	LSU (9–3)	LSU (9–3)	13.
14.	LSU (6–2)	Missouri (7–2)	Oklahoma (8–2)	LSU (8–3)	Louisville (10–2)	Arizona (9–3)	14.
15.	Notre Dame (7–2)	Oklahoma State (7–2)	LSU (7–3)	Arizona (8–3)	Arizona (9–3)	Louisville (10–3)	15.
16.	Oregon State (6–2)	Kansas (7–2)	Iowa (8–2)	Oregon State (8–3)	Iowa (10–2)	Notre Dame (9–3)	16.
17.	Tennessee (6–2)	Oklahoma (7–2)	Arizona (7–3)	Iowa (9–2)	Notre Dame (9–3)	Iowa (10–3)	17.
18.	Utah (6–2)	Utah (7–2)	Tennessee (7–3)	Notre Dame (8–3)	Oklahoma State (9–3)	NC State (9–3)	18.
19.	UCLA (6–2)	LSU (6–3)	Notre Dame (7–3)	Kansas State (8–3)	NC State (9–3)	Oregon State (8–4)	19.
20.	USC (7–2)	Notre Dame (7–3)	North Carolina (8–2)	Oklahoma State (8–3)	Oregon State (8–4)	Oklahoma State (9–4)	20.
21.	Kansas (6–2)	Arizona (6–3)	Kansas State (7–3)	Tennessee (7–4)	Tennessee (8–4)	Tennessee (8–4)	21.
22.	Oklahoma State (6–2)	Iowa (7–2)	Utah (7–3)	NC State (8–3)	Tulane (11–1)	Clemson (8–4)	22.
23.	Kansas State (6–2)	Tulane (8–1)	Oklahoma State (7–3)	Tulane (10–1)	Clemson (8–4)	Liberty (13–0)	23.
24.	Tulane (7–1)	North Carolina (7–2)	Tulane (9–1)	Clemson (7–4)	Liberty (12–0)	SMU (11–2)	24.
25.	Air Force (8–0)	Kansas State (6–3)	Kansas (7–3)	Liberty (11–0)	Kansas State (8–4)	Kansas State (8–4)	25.
	Week 9 Oct 31	Week 10 Nov 7	Week 11 Nov 14	Week 12 Nov 21	Week 13 Nov 28	Week 14 (Final) Dec 3	
		Dropped: UCLA (6–3); USC (7–3); Air Force (8–1)	None	Dropped: North Carolina (8–3); Utah (7–4); Kansas (7–4)	None	Dropped: Tulane (11–2)	

== FWAA-NFF Super 16 Poll ==
The joint poll of the Football Writers Association of America and National Football Foundation is a human poll which the NCAA Football Bowl Subdivision Records book designates as being one of the "major selectors" of national championships. The NFF automatically awards its MacArthur Bowl National Championship Trophy to the winner of the College Football Playoff National Championship.

	Preseason Aug 15	Week 1 Sep 5	Week 2 Sep 10	Week 3 Sep 17	Week 4 Sep 24	Week 5 Oct 1	Week 6 Oct 8	Week 7 Oct 15	Week 8 Oct 22	Week 9 Oct 29	Week 10 Nov 5	Week 11 Nov 12	Week 12 Nov 19	Week 13 Nov 26	Week 14 (Final) Dec 3	
1.	Georgia (51)	Georgia (1–0) (47)	Georgia (2–0) (47)	Georgia (3–0) (46)	Georgia (4–0) (46)	Georgia (5–0) (28)	Georgia (6–0) (40)	Georgia (7–0) (29)	Georgia (7–0) (29)	Georgia (8–0) (39)	Georgia (9–0) (35)	Georgia (10–0) (40)	Georgia (11–0) (52)	Georgia (12–0) (43)	Michigan (13–0) (41)	1.
2.	Michigan (6)	Michigan (1–0) (5)	Michigan (2–0) (4)	Michigan (3–0) (4)	Texas (4–0) (1)	Texas (5–0) (8)	Michigan (6–0) (10)	Michigan (7–0) (15)	Michigan (8–0) (19)	Michigan (8–0) (11)	Michigan (9–0) (11)	Michigan (10–0) (11)	Michigan (11–0) (2)	Michigan (12–0) (12)	Washington (13–0) (13)	2.
3.	Ohio State (2)	Alabama (1–0) (1)	Florida State (2–0) (4)	Texas (3–0)	Michigan (4–0) (4)	Michigan (5–0) (14)	Ohio State (5–0)	Florida State (6–0) (2)	Ohio State (7–0) (6)	Ohio State (8–0) (3)	Ohio State (9–0) (6)	Ohio State (10–0) (4)	Ohio State (11–0) (1)	Washington (12–0) (1)	Texas (12–1)	3.
4.	Alabama	Florida State (1–0) (4)	Texas (2–0) (2)	Florida State (3–0) (3)	Ohio State (3–0)	Ohio State (4–0)	Florida State (5–0) (3)	Ohio State (6–0)	Florida State (7–0) (1)	Florida State (8–0) (2)	Florida State (9–0) (4)	Florida State (10–0) (1)	Washington (11–0) (1)	Florida State (12–0)	Alabama (12–1) (1)	4.
5.	LSU	Ohio State (1–0)	USC (3–0)	USC (3–0) (2)	Florida State (4–0) (4)	Florida State (4–0) (4)	Oklahoma (6–0) (2)	Washington (6–0) (9)	Washington (7–0) (1)	Washington (8–0) (1)	Washington (9–0)	Washington (10–0)	Florida State (11–0)	Oregon (11–1)	Florida State (13–0)	5.
6.	USC	USC (1–0)	Ohio State (2–0)	Ohio State (3–0)	Washington (4–0) (2)	Washington (5–0) (2)	Washington (5–0) (1)	Oklahoma (6–0) (1)	Oklahoma (7–0)	Oregon (7–1)	Oregon (8–1)	Oregon (9–1)	Oregon (10–1)	Ohio State (11–1)	Georgia (12–1) (1)	6.
7.	Penn State	Penn State (1–0)	Penn State (2–0)	Washington (3–0) (2)	Penn State (4–0)	Penn State (5–0)	Penn State (5–0)	Penn State (6–0)	Texas (6–1)	Texas (7–1)	Texas (8–1)	Texas (9–1)	Texas (10–1)	Texas (11–1)	Ohio State (11–1)	7.
8.	Clemson	Washington (1–0)	Washington (2–0)	Penn State (3–0)	USC (4–0)	Oregon (5–0)	Oregon (5–0)	Texas (5–1)	Oregon (6–1)	Alabama (7–1)	Alabama (8–1)	Alabama (9–1)	Alabama (10–1)	Alabama (11–1)	Oregon (11–2)	8.
9.	Florida State	Tennessee (1–0)	Notre Dame (3–0)	Notre Dame (4–0)	Oregon (4–0)	USC (5–0)	Texas (5–1)	Oregon (5–1)	Alabama (7–1)	Penn State (7–1)	Penn State (8–1)	Louisville (9–1)	Louisville (10–1)	Missouri (10–2)	Missouri (10–2)	9.
10.	Washington	Notre Dame (1–0)	Alabama (1–1)	Oregon (3–0)	Utah (4–0)	Notre Dame (5–1)	USC (6–0)	North Carolina (6–0)	Penn State (6–1)	Oklahoma (7–1)	Ole Miss (8–1)	Oregon State (8–2)	Missouri (9–2)	Penn State (10–2)	Penn State (10–2)	10.
11.	Tennessee	Texas (1–0)	Tennessee (2–0)	Utah (3–0)	Notre Dame (4–1)	Alabama (4–1)	Alabama (5–1)	Alabama (6–1)	Oregon State (6–1)	Ole Miss (7–1)	Louisville (8–1)	Missouri (8–2)	Penn State (9–2)	Ole Miss (10–2)	Ole Miss (10–2)	11.
12.	Texas	Utah (1–0)	Utah (2–0)	Alabama (2–1)	Alabama (3–1)	Oklahoma (5–0)	North Carolina (5–0)	Oregon State (6–1)	Ole Miss (6–1)	Notre Dame (7–2)	Oregon State (7–2)	Penn State (8–2)	Ole Miss (9–2)	Oklahoma (10–2)	Oklahoma (10–2)	12.
13.	Notre Dame	Oregon (1–0)	Oregon (2–0)	LSU (2–1)	LSU (3–1)	North Carolina (4–0)	Louisville (6–0)	Ole Miss (5–1)	Utah (6–1)	LSU (6–2)	Tennessee (7–2)	Oklahoma (8–2)	Oklahoma (9–2)	LSU (8–3)	LSU (9–3)	13.
14.	Utah	LSU (0–1)	LSU (1–1)	Oklahoma (3–0)	Oklahoma (4–0)	Washington State (4–0)	Ole Miss (5–1)	Notre Dame (6–2)	Notre Dame (6–2)	Missouri (7–1)	Oklahoma State (7–2)	Ole Miss (8–2)	Oregon State (8–3)	Arizona (9–3)	Arizona (9–3)	14.
15.	Oregon	North Carolina (1–0)	Kansas State (2–0)	Colorado (3–0)	North Carolina (4–0)	Ole Miss (4–1)	Oregon State (5–1)	Duke (5–1)	LSU (6–2)	Louisville (7–1)	Utah (7–2)	LSU (7–3)	LSU (8–3)	Louisville (10–2)	Louisville (10–3)	15.
16.	TCU	Kansas State (1–0)	Colorado (2–0)	Oregon State (3–0)	Duke (4–0)	Oregon State (4–1)	Tennessee (4–1)	Utah (5–1)	Missouri (7–1)	Oregon State (6–2)	Missouri (7–2)	Utah (7–3)	Arizona (8–3)	Iowa (10–2)	Notre Dame (9–3)	16.
	Preseason Aug 15	Week 1 Sep 5	Week 2 Sep 10	Week 3 Sep 17	Week 4 Sep 24	Week 5 Oct 1	Week 6 Oct 8	Week 7 Oct 15	Week 8 Oct 22	Week 9 Oct 29	Week 10 Nov 5	Week 11 Nov 12	Week 12 Nov 19	Week 13 Nov 26	Week 14 (Final) Dec 3	
		Dropped: Clemson (0–1); TCU (0–1)	Dropped: North Carolina (2–0)	Dropped: Tennessee (2–1); Kansas State (2–1)	Dropped: Colorado (3–1); Oregon State (3–1)	Dropped: Utah (4–1); LSU (3–2); Duke (4–1)	Dropped: Notre Dame (5–2); Washington State (4–1)	Dropped: USC (6–1); Louisville (6–1); Tennessee (5–1)	Dropped: North Carolina (6–1); Duke (5–2)	Dropped: Utah (6–2)	Dropped: Oklahoma (7–2); Notre Dame (7–3); LSU (6–3)	Dropped: Tennessee (7–3); Oklahoma State (7–3)	Dropped: Utah (7–4)	Dropped: Oregon State (8–4)	Dropped: Iowa (10–3)	
