= KC Concepcion (American football) =

American football player (born 2004)

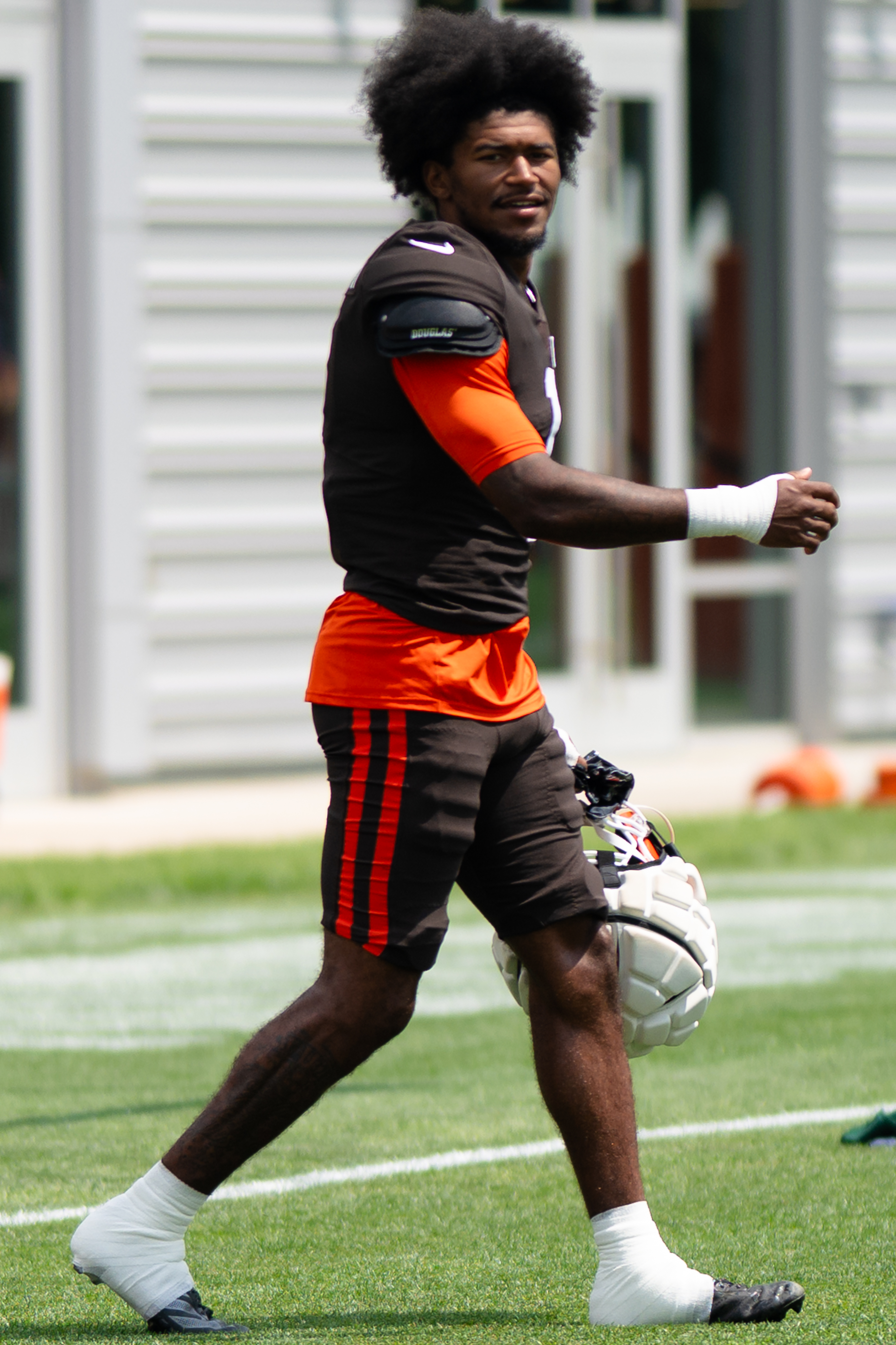
- Concepcion with the Cleveland Browns in 2026

No. 1 – Cleveland Browns
- Positions: Wide receiver, punt returner
- Roster status: Active

Personal information
- Born: September 24, 2004 (age 22); Rochester, New York, U.S.
- Listed height: 6 ft 0 in (1.83 m)
- Listed weight: 196 lb (89 kg)

Career information
- High school: Julius L. Chambers (Charlotte, North Carolina)
- College: NC State (2023–2024); Texas A&M (2025)
- NFL draft: 2026: 1st round, 24th overall pick

Career history
- Cleveland Browns (2026–present)

Awards and highlights
- Paul Hornung Award (2025); Consensus All-American (2025); Second team All-ACC (2023); First team All-SEC (2025); Maurice Bassett Award (2026)

Career NFL statistics as of Week 10, 2026
- Receptions: 40
- Receiving yards: 458
- Receiving touchdowns: 1
- Rushing yards: 43
- Rushing touchdowns: 1
- Stats at Pro Football Reference

Kevin "KC" Concepcion Jr. (/kənˌsɛpsiˈoʊn/ kohn-sep-see-OHN; born September 24, 2004) is an American professional football wide receiver and punt returner for the Cleveland Browns of the National Football League (NFL). He played college football for the NC State Wolfpack and Texas A&M Aggies and was selected by the Browns in the first round of the 2026 NFL draft.

== Early life ==
Concepcion was born on September 24, 2004, in Rochester, New York, moving to Charlotte, North Carolina, when he was three. He is of Afro-Puerto Rican descent. Concepcion attended Julius L. Chambers High School in Charlotte. As a junior, he had 36 catches for 458 yards and eight touchdowns while also returning three punts for touchdowns. In his high school career, Concepcion caught 65 passes for 977 yards and 12 touchdowns. He was also a member of the school's back-to-back North Carolina 4AA state championship teams in 2019 and 2020. Concepcion was a four-star recruit and was the No. 8 player in North Carolina and the No. 50 wide receiver in the nation according to Rivals.

He committed to play college football at NC State over offers from North Carolina, Boston College, Charlotte, Coastal Carolina, Duke, East Carolina, Florida State, Georgia Tech, Louisville, Marshall, Maryland, Memphis, Michigan State, Mississippi State, Old Dominion, Penn State, Vanderbilt, Wake Forest and West Virginia.

Concepcion was open about his speech impediment during the 2026 process, after an interview of him addressing his stutter went viral after the NFL Combine. Concepcion was born with his stutter and his father also shares a similar speech impediment.

== College career ==
=== NC State ===
Concepcion joined NC State as an early enrollee in January 2023. During the 2023 season against rivals North Carolina Concepcion hauled in seven receptions for 131 yards and two touchdowns. During his freshman season in 2023, he played in 12 games and started 11 of them, finishing the season with 64 receptions for 767 yards and 10 touchdowns. He also rushed 38 times for 297 yards. Concepcion set NC State freshman records for receptions and receiving yards.

On December 3, 2024, Concepcion announced that he would enter the NCAA transfer portal.

=== Texas A&M ===
On December 29, 2024, Concepcion announced that he would transfer to Texas A&M. He received first-team All-SEC honors as a wide receiver, all-purpose player, and return specialist. Concepcion also won the 2025 Paul Hornung Award. Concepcion declared for the NFL draft following the season.

== Professional career ==
Pre-draft measurables
Height	Weight	Arm length	Hand span	Wingspan
5 ft 11 5/8 in (1.82 m)	196 lb (89 kg)	30 1/4 in (0.77 m)	9 1/4 in (0.23 m)	6 ft 2 7/8 in (1.90 m)
All values from NFL Combine

=== Cleveland Browns ===
==== 2026 ====
On April 23, 2026, Concepcion was taken in the first round of the 2026 NFL draft with the 24th overall pick by the Cleveland Browns. The Browns acquired the pick as part of deal that traded the 2nd pick in the 2025 NFL Draft to the Jacksonville Jaguars.

Concepcion was named the recipient of the 2026 Maurice Bassett Award, which is annually presented to the most outstanding rookie at Cleveland Browns' training camp.

== Career statistics ==
=== NFL ===
NFL regular season statistics
Year	Team	Games		Receiving					Rushing					Punt returns					Fumbles	
Year	Team	GP	GS	Rec	Yds	Avg	Lng	TD	Att	Yds	Avg	Lng	TD	Ret	Yds	Avg	Lng	TD	Fum	Lost
2026	CLE	10	9	40	458	11.5	64	1	11	43	3.9	18	1	6	55	9.2	21	0	1	1
Career		10	9	40	458	11.5	64	1	11	40	3.9	18	1	6	55	9.2	21	0	1	1

=== College ===
Season	Team	Games		Receiving				Rushing				Punt returns			
Season	Team	GP	GS	Rec	Yds	Avg	TD	Att	Yds	Avg	TD	Ret	Yds	Avg	TD
2023	NC State	13	12	71	839	11.8	10	41	320	7.8	0	0	0	0.0	0
2024	NC State	12	12	53	460	8.7	6	19	36	1.9	2	5	45	9.0	0
2025	Texas A&M	13	13	61	919	15.1	9	10	75	7.5	1	25	456	18.2	2
Career		38	37	185	2,218	12.0	25	70	431	6.2	3	30	501	16.7	2
