= 2023 Boston College Eagles football team =

American college football season

2023 Boston College Eagles football

Fenway Bowl champion

Fenway Bowl, W 23–14 vs. SMU
- Conference: Atlantic Coast Conference
- Record: 7–6 (3–5 ACC)
- Head coach: Jeff Hafley (4th season)
- Offensive coordinator: Steve Shimko (1st season)
- Offensive scheme: Multiple pro-style
- Co-defensive coordinators: Aazaar Abdul-Rahim (1st season); Sean Duggan (1st season)
- Base defense: 4–2–5
- Home stadium: Alumni Stadium

2023 Atlantic Coast Conference football standings
	Conf.			Overall
Team	W		L	W		L
No. 6 Florida State y$	8	–	0	13	–	1
No. 19 Louisville y	7	–	1	10	–	4
No. 21 NC State	6	–	2	9	–	4
Georgia Tech	5	–	3	7	–	6
Virginia Tech	5	–	3	7	–	6
No. 20 Clemson	4	–	4	9	–	4
Duke	4	–	4	8	–	5
North Carolina	4	–	4	8	–	5
Boston College	3	–	5	7	–	6
Miami (FL)	3	–	5	7	–	6
Syracuse	2	–	6	6	–	7
Pittsburgh	2	–	6	3	–	9
Virginia	2	–	6	3	–	9
Wake Forest	1	–	7	4	–	8
Championship: Florida State 16, Louisville 6
$ – Conference champion; y – Championship game participant; Rankings from AP Poll

The 2023 Boston College Eagles football team represented Boston College as a member of the Atlantic Coast Conference (ACC) during the 2023 NCAA Division I FBS football season. They were led by fourth-year head coach Jeff Hafley and played their home games at Alumni Stadium in Chestnut Hill, Massachusetts. They finished the regular season with a 6–6 record, and were invited to the Wasabi Fenway Bowl, where they defeated SMU, 23–14.

On February 1, Hafley resigned as head coach to become the defensive coordinator of the NFL's Green Bay Packers. He was subsequently replaced by Bill O'Brien.

The Boston College Eagles football team drew an average home attendance of 36,376 in 2023, the 62nd highest in college football.

== Offseason ==
=== Recruits ===
==== 2023 recruiting class ====
Boston College signed 18 players in the class of 2023.

College recruiting
Name	Hometown	School	Height	Weight	Commit date
Kahlil Ali; DB	Pennsauken, New Jersey	Pennsauken	6 ft 1 in (1.85 m)	190 lb (86 kg)	Dec 10, 2022
Kahlil Ali; DB	Recruit ratings: Rivals: 247Sports: On3: ESPN: (79)				
Shawn Battle; DB	Philadelphia, Pennsylvania	Neumann Goretti	5 ft 11 in (1.80 m)	175 lb (79 kg)	Jun 5, 2022
Shawn Battle; DB	Recruit ratings: Rivals: 247Sports: On3: ESPN: (79)				
Michael Crounse; OL	Schnecksville, Pennsylvania	DeMatha Catholic (MD)	6 ft 5 in (1.96 m)	310 lb (140 kg)	Jun 14, 2022
Michael Crounse; OL	Recruit ratings: Rivals: 247Sports: On3: ESPN: (74)				
Eryx Daugherty; DL	Troy, Michigan	Brother Rice	6 ft 4 in (1.93 m)	295 lb (134 kg)	Mar 19, 2022
Eryx Daugherty; DL	Recruit ratings: Rivals: 247Sports: On3: ESPN: (74)				
Carter Davis; DB	Baltimore, Maryland	Mount Saint Joseph	6 ft 2 in (1.88 m)	170 lb (77 kg)	Apr 29, 2022
Carter Davis; DB	Recruit ratings: Rivals: 247Sports: On3: ESPN: (76)				
Palaie Faoa; LB	Ewa Beach, Hawai'i	Bishop Gorman (NV)	6 ft 1 in (1.85 m)	215 lb (98 kg)	Jul 2, 2022
Palaie Faoa; LB	Recruit ratings: Rivals: 247Sports: On3: ESPN: (75)				
Josiah Griffin; DL	Springfield, Massachusetts	Springfield Central	6 ft 4 in (1.93 m)	235 lb (107 kg)	Sep 16, 2022
Josiah Griffin; DL	Recruit ratings: Rivals: 247Sports: On3: ESPN: (73)				
Reed Harris; ATH	Great Falls, Montana	Great Falls	6 ft 5 in (1.96 m)	210 lb (95 kg)	Apr 14, 2022
Reed Harris; ATH	Recruit ratings: Rivals: 247Sports: On3: ESPN: (79)				
Nate Johnson; WR	St. Petersburg, Florida	Clearwater Central Catholic	5 ft 10 in (1.78 m)	170 lb (77 kg)	Jun 16, 2022
Nate Johnson; WR	Recruit ratings: Rivals: 247Sports: On3: ESPN: (81)				
Datrell Jones; RB	Hyde Park, Massachusetts	Catholic Memorial	5 ft 10 in (1.78 m)	185 lb (84 kg)	Aug 5, 2020
Datrell Jones; RB	Recruit ratings: Rivals: 247Sports: On3: ESPN: (79)				
Ryan Mickow; OL	Fort Lauderdale, Florida	St. Thomas Aquinas	6 ft 5 in (1.96 m)	275 lb (125 kg)	Jun 12, 2022
Ryan Mickow; OL	Recruit ratings: Rivals: 247Sports: On3: ESPN: (76)				
KP Price; DB	Baltimore, Maryland	St. Frances Academy	6 ft 2 in (1.88 m)	185 lb (84 kg)	Sep 18, 2022
KP Price; DB	Recruit ratings: Rivals: 247Sports: On3: ESPN: (76)				
Jacobe Robinson; QB	Henderson, Texas	Henderson	6 ft 4 in (1.93 m)	225 lb (102 kg)	Feb 26, 2022
Jacobe Robinson; QB	Recruit ratings: Rivals: 247Sports: On3: ESPN: (80)				
Jaedn Skeete; WR	Hyde Park, Massachusetts	Catholic Memorial	6 ft 1 in (1.85 m)	180 lb (82 kg)	Aug 5, 2020
Jaedn Skeete; WR	Recruit ratings: Rivals: 247Sports: On3: ESPN: (76)				
Sam Stone; K	Austin, Texas	St. Michael's Academy	6 ft 1 in (1.85 m)	180 lb (82 kg)	Feb 3, 2023
Sam Stone; K	Recruit ratings: Rivals: 247Sports: On3: ESPN: (N/A)				
Holden Symonds; TE	Melrose, Massachusetts	Governor's Academy	6 ft 6 in (1.98 m)	245 lb (111 kg)	May 31, 2022
Holden Symonds; TE	Recruit ratings: Rivals: 247Sports: On3: ESPN: (72)				
Max Tucker; CB	Hyde Park, Massachusetts	Catholic Memorial	6 ft 0 in (1.83 m)	180 lb (82 kg)	Dec 20, 2022
Max Tucker; CB	Recruit ratings: Rivals: 247Sports: On3: ESPN: (74)				
Montrell Wade; WR	Tyler, Texas	Tyler	6 ft 1 in (1.85 m)	180 lb (82 kg)	Jun 21, 2022
Montrell Wade; WR	Recruit ratings: Rivals: 247Sports: On3: ESPN: (77)				

=== Transfer portal ===
==== Outgoing transfers ====
Boston College lost 13 players to the NCAA transfer portal.

Name	Pos.	New school
Phil Jurkovec	QB	Pittsburgh
Clinton Burton Jr.	CB	Charlotte
Izaiah Henderson	DL	Maine
Jason Maitre	S	Wisconsin
Kivon Wright	DE	Boise State
Kevin Pyne	OT	Rhode Island
Daelen Menard	S	Bowling Green
Josh DeBerry	CB	Texas A&M
Finn Dirstine	IOL	Texas A&M
Jaelen Gill	WR	Fresno State
Shawn Battle	CB	None
Christian Curatolo	OT	Lehigh
Steve Lubischer	CB	Bowling Green

==== Incoming transfers ====
Boston College received 10 players from the college football transfer portal.

Name	Pos.	Previous school
George Rooks	DT	Michigan
Kye Robichaux	RB	Western Kentucky
Ryan O'Keefe	WR	UCF
Logan Taylor	OT	Virginia
Victor Nelson Jr.	S	LIU
Alex Washington	CB	Harvard
Khari Johnson	CB	Arkansas
Kyle Hergel	OG	Texas State
Michael Wright	LS	Penn State
Thomas Castellanos	QB	UCF

== Schedule ==
Boston College and the ACC announced the 2023 football schedule on January 30, 2023. The 2023 season will be the conference's first season since 2004 that its scheduling format just includes one division. The new format sets Boston College with three set conference opponents, while playing the remaining ten teams twice in an (home and away) in a four–year cycle. The Eagles three set conference opponents for the next four years was; Miami (FL), Pittsburgh, and Syracuse, though this annual opponent structure was abandoned after just one season due to conference expansion.

Date	Time	Opponent	Site	TV	Result	Attendance
September 2	12:00 p.m.	Northern Illinois*	Alumni Stadium; Chestnut Hill, MA	ACCN	L 24–27 ^{OT}	30,122
September 9	12:00 p.m.	No. 5 (FCS) Holy Cross*	Alumni Stadium; Chestnut Hill, MA (rivalry)	ACCNX/ESPN+	W 31–28	40,122
September 16	12:00 p.m.	No. 3 Florida State	Alumni Stadium; Chestnut Hill, MA	ABC	L 29–31	41,383
September 23	3:30 p.m.	at Louisville	L&N Stadium; Louisville, KY	ACCN	L 28–56	48,294
September 30	2:00 p.m.	Virginia	Alumni Stadium; Chestnut Hill, MA	The CW	W 27–24	41,868
October 7	12:00 p.m.	at Army*	Michie Stadium; West Point, NY	CBSSN	W 27–24	34,017
October 21	12:00 p.m.	at Georgia Tech	Bobby Dodd Stadium; Atlanta, GA	ACCN	W 38–23	35,656
October 28	12:00 p.m.	UConn*^{†}	Alumni Stadium; Chestnut Hill, MA	ACCN	W 21–14	36,902
November 3	7:30 p.m.	at Syracuse	JMA Wireless Dome; Syracuse, NY	ESPN2	W 17–10	42,523
November 11	12:00 p.m.	Virginia Tech	Alumni Stadium; Chestnut Hill, MA (rivalry)	ACCN	L 22–48	33,665
November 16	7:00 p.m.	at Pittsburgh	Acrisure Stadium; Pittsburgh, PA	ESPN	L 16–24	41,842
November 24	12:00 p.m.	Miami (FL)	Alumni Stadium; Chestnut Hill, MA	ABC	L 20–45	30,569
December 28	11:00 a.m.	vs. No. 24 SMU	Fenway Park; Boston, MA (Fenway Bowl)	ESPN	W 23–14	16,238
*Non-conference game; ^{†}Homecoming; Rankings from AP Poll (and CFP Rankings, after November 2) - Released prior to game; All times are in Eastern time

== Personnel ==
=== Coaching staff ===
- Jeff Hafley – Head coach
- Rob Chudzinski – Associate head coach (offense)
- Steve Shimko – Offensive coordinator/quarterbacks coach
- Sean Duggan – Co-Defensive coordinator/Linebackers coach
- Aazaar Abdul-Rahim – Co-Defensive coordinator/defensive backs coach
- Matt Thurin – Special Teams Coordinator/Safeties
- Vince Oghobaase – Defensive Line
- Paul Rhoads – Outside Linebackers
- Ryan McCarthy – Special assistant to the head coach
- Matt Applebaum – Offensive line coach

== Game summaries ==
=== vs Northern Illinois ===
Northern Illinois Huskies (0–0) vs Boston College Eagles (0–0) – Game summary

Quarter	1	2	3	4	OT	Total
Huskies	0	7	7	7	6	27
Eagles	0	0	7	14	3	24

at Alumni Stadium • Chestnut Hill, MA

- Date: September 2, 2023
- Game time: 12:00 p.m.
- Game attendance: 30,122
- Referee: Billy Williams
- TV announcers (ACCN): Chris Cotter (play-by-play), Mark Herzlich (analyst), and Ashley Stroehlein (sideline)

Game information

First quarter

None

Second quarter

- (02:44) NIU TD: Antario Brown 7–yard pass from Justin Lynch (Jake Seibert kick) NIU 7–0; 8 plays, 60 yards, 5:14.

Third quarter

- (10:33) NIU TD: Antario Brown 2–yard run (Jake Seibert kick) NIU 14–0; 9 plays, 75 yards, 4:27.
- (04:58) BC TD: Lewis Bond 11–yard pass from Thomas Castellanos (Liam Connor kick) NIU 14–7; 5 plays, 25 yards, 1:55.

Fourth quarter

- (09:24) NIU TD: Brock Lampe 1–yard run (Jake Seibert kick) NIU 21–7; 12 plays, 55 yards, 7:04.
- (05:59) BC TD: Thomas Castellanos 2–yard run (Liam Connor kick) NIU 21–14; 10 plays, 59 yards, 3:24.
- (01:44) BC TD: Jaden Williams 30-yard pass from Thomas Castellanos (Liam Conner kick) TIE 21–21; 6 plays 83 yards, 1:39

Overtime

- (00:00) BC FG: Liam Connor 39-yard field goal BC 24–21; 4 plays, 4 yards, 0:00.
- (00:00) NIU TD: Rocky Lombardi 1-yard run NIU 27–24; 4 plays, 25 yards, 0:00.

Top passers

- NIU – Rocky Lombardi – 13/29, 165 yards
- BC – Thomas Castellanos – 13/28, 138 yards, 2 TD, INT

Top rushers

- NIU – Gavin Williams – 15 carries, 61 yards
- BC – Thomas Castellanos – 9 carries, 74 yards, TD

Top receivers

- NIU – Kacper Rutkiewicz – 5 receptions, 46 yards
- BC – Lewis Bond – 4 receptions, 40 yards, TD

=== vs No. 5 (FCS) Holy Cross ===
No. 5 (FCS) Holy Cross Crusaders (1–0) vs Boston College Eagles (0–1) – Game summary

Quarter	1	2	3	4	Total
No. 5 (FCS) Crusaders	0	14	7	7	28
Eagles	7	17	0	7	31

at Alumni Stadium • Chestnut Hill, MA

- Date: September 9, 2023
- Game time: 12:00 p.m.
- Game attendance: 40,122
- Referee: Billy Williams
- TV announcers (ACCNX/ESPN+): Bill Spaulding (play-by-play) and Mark Herzlich (analyst)

Game information

First quarter

- (8:49) BC: Kye Robichaux 3-yard run, Liam Connor kick (Drive: 14 plays, 85 yards, 6:08; Boston College 7–0)

Second quarter

Third quarter

- (12:40) HC:

Fourth quarter

- (14:55) BC:
- (7:26) HC:

=== vs No. 3 Florida State ===
No. 3 Florida State Seminoles (0–0) vs Boston College Eagles (0–0) – Game summary

Quarter	1	2	3	4	Total
No. 3 Seminoles	3	14	14	0	31
Eagles	7	3	6	13	29

at Alumni Stadium • Chestnut Hill, MA

- Date: September 16, 2023
- Game time: 12:00 p.m.
- TV announcers (ABC): Dave Pasch (play-by-play), Dusty Dvoracek (analyst), and Tom Luginbill (sideline)

Game information

First quarter

Second quarter

Third quarter

Fourth quarter

=== at Louisville ===
Boston College Eagles (1–2) at Louisville Cardinals (3–0) – Game summary

Quarter	1	2	3	4	Total
Eagles	0	14	7	7	28
Cardinals	14	28	14	0	56

at L&N Stadium • Louisville, KY

- Date: September 23, 2023
- Game time: 12:00 p.m. EST
- Game weather: Sunny • Temperature: 80 °F (27 °C) • Wind: 7 mph NE
- Game attendance: 48,294
- Referee: Jeff Flanagan
- TV announcers (ACC Network): Jorge Sedano (play-by-play), Orlando Franklin (analyst), and Marilyn Payne (sideline)

Game information

First quarter

- 9:47 LOU – Jawhar Jordan 33-yard run (Brock Travelstead kick) – 7–0 Louisville, Drive: 5 plays, 59 yards, 2:19
- 3:21 LOU – Nate Kurisky 1-yard pass from Jack Plummer (Brock Travelstead kick) – 14–0 Louisville, Drive: 11 plays, 62 yards, 5:09

Second quarter

- 14:12 LOU – Ahmari Huggins-Bruce 45-yard pass from Jack Plummer (Brock Travelstead kick) – 21–0 Louisville, Drive: 5 plays, 70 yards, 2:05
- 8:43 LOU – Jack Plummer 9-yard run (Brock Travelstead kick) – 28–0 Louisville, Drive: 8 plays, 61 yards, 4:04
- 5:38 BC – Thomas Castellanos 39-yard run (Liam Connor kick) – 28–7 Louisville, Drive: 7 plays, 75 yards, 3:05
- 3:19 LOU – Jawhar Jordan 2-yard run (Brock Travelstead kick) – 35–7 Louisville, Drive: 4 plays, 55 yards, 2:11
- 0:33 BC – Ryan O'Keefe 30-yard pass from Thomas Castellanos (Liam Connor kick) – 35–14 Louisville, Drive: 8 plays, 75 yards, 2:46
- 0:08 LOU – Jamari Thrash 42-yard pass from Jack Plummer (Brock Travelstead kick) – 42–14 Louisville, Drive: 3 plays, 75 yards, 0:25

Third quarter

- 14:46 LOU – Jawhar Jordan 75-yard pass from Jack Plummer (Brock Travelstead kick) – 49–14 Louisville, Drive: 1 play, 75 yards, 0:14
- 12:53 BC – Lewis Bond 22-yard pass from Thomas Castellanos (Liam Connor kick) – 49–21 Louisville, Drive: 7 plays, 75 yards, 1:53
- 10:04 LOU – Ahmari Huggins-Bruce 55-yard pass from Jack Plummer (Brock Travelstead kick) – 56–21 Louisville, Drive: 1 play, 55 yards, 0:09

Fourth quarter

- 14:33 BC – Lewis Bond 11-yard pass from Thomas Castellanos (Liam Connor kick) – 56–28 Louisville, Drive: 9 plays, 72 yards, 2:46

Top passers

- BC – Thomas Castellanos – 17/33, 265 yards, 3 TD
- LOU – Jack Plummer – 18/21, 388 yards, 5 TD

Top rushers

- BC – Thomas Castellanos – 10 carries, 49 yards, TD
- LOU – Jawhar Jordan – 18 carries, 134 yards, 2 TD

Top receivers

- BC – Ryan O'Keefe – 5 receptions, 86 yards, TD
- LOU – Ahmari Huggins-Bruce – 3 receptions, 110 yards, 2 TD

=== vs Virginia ===
Virginia Cavaliers (0–0) vs Boston College Eagles (0–0) – Game summary

Quarter	1	2	3	4	Total
Cavaliers	7	14	0	3	24
Eagles	0	7	17	3	27

at Alumni Stadium • Chestnut Hill, MA

- Date: September 30, 2023
- Game time: 2:00 p.m.
- TV announcers (The CW): Tom Werme (play-by-play), James Bates (analyst), and Tabitha Turner (sideline)

Game information

First quarter

Second quarter

Third quarter

Fourth quarter

=== at Army ===
Boston College Eagles (2–3) at Army Black Knights (2–2) – Game summary

Quarter	1	2	3	4	Total
Eagles	6	7	7	7	27
Black Knights	0	3	14	7	24

at Michie Stadium • West Point, NY

- Date: October 7, 2023
- Game time: 12:00 p.m. EDT
- Game weather: Temperature: 68 °F (20 °C) • Wind: SE 1 mph • Weather: Rain
- Game attendance: 34,017
- Referee: Riley Johnson
- TV announcers (CBSSN): Chris Lewis (play-by-play), Ross Tucker (analyst), and Tina Cervasio (sideline)
- ESPN – Castellanos rushes for 4 TDs, including winner with 25 seconds left, as BC beats Army 27–24

Game information

First quarter

- (07:35) BC TD – Thomas Castellanos 20-yard rush, Liam Connor kick failed Drive: 5 plays, 40 yards, 2:21; Boston College 6–0

Second quarter

- (10:08) ARMY FG – Quinn Maretzki 22-yard field goal Drive: 6 plays, 38 yards, 2:47; Boston College 6–3
- (01:24) BC TD – Thomas Castellanos 4-yard rush, Liam Connor kick Drive: 17 plays, 75 yards, 8:44; Boston College 13–3

Third quarter

- (10:48) ARMY TD – Tyrell Robinson 10-yard rush, Quinn Maretzki kick Drive: 6 plays, 37 yards, 4:12; Boston College 13–10
- (07:36) BC TD – Thomas Castellanos 10-yard rush, Liam Connor kick Drive: 6 plays, 75 yards, 3:12; Boston College 20–10
- (02:51) ARMY TD – Hayden Reed 6-yard rush, Quinn Maretzki kick Drive: 8 plays, 69 yards, 4:45; Boston College 20–17

Fourth quarter

- (11:43) ARMY TD – Tyson Riley 9-yard pass from Bryson Daily, Quinn Maretzki kick Drive: 7 plays, 61 yards, 3:40; Army 24–20
- (00:25) BC TD – Thomas Castellanos 1-yard rush, Liam Connor kick Drive: 12 plays, 62 yards, 4:59; Boston College 27–24

Top passers

- BC – Thomas Castellanos: 4/9, 51 yards, INT
- ARMY – Bryson Daily: 10/13, 105 yards, TD

Top rushers

- BC – Thomas Castellanos: 31 carries, 142 yards, 4 TD
- ARMY – Bryson Daily: 14 carries, 99 yards

Top receivers

- BC – Jaden Williams: 1 reception, 35 yards
- ARMY – Casey Reynolds: 2 receptions, 37 yards

=== at Georgia Tech ===
Boston College Eagles (3–3) at Georgia Tech Yellow Jackets (3–3) – Game summary

Quarter	1	2	3	4	Total
Eagles	10	7	0	21	38
Yellow Jackets	7	3	13	0	23

at Bobby Dodd Stadium • Atlanta, GA

- Date: October 21, 2023
- Game time: 12:00 p.m.
- Game weather: Sunny, 65 °F (18 °C) • Wind: SE 6 mph (9.7 km/h)
- Game attendance: 35,656
- Referee: Tim Hedgepeth
- TV announcers (ACCN): Chris Cotter (play-by-play), Mark Herzlich (analyst), and Sherree Burruss (sideline)

Game information

First quarter

- (08:51) BC – Liam Connor 24-yard field goal (Drive: 7 plays, 82 yards, 2:11; Boston College 3-0)
- (03:49) GT – Jamal Haynes 16-yard run (Aidan Birr kick) (Drive: 10 plays, 69 yards, 4:56; Georgia Tech 7-3)
- (01:42) BC – Amari Jackson 30-yard interception return (Liam Connor kick) (Drive: 0:35; Boston College 10-7)

Second quarter

- (06:02) GT – Aidan Birr 46-yard field goal (Drive: 10 plays, 61 yards, 4:22; Tied 10-10)
- (00:52) BC – Thomas Castellanos 12-yard run (Liam Connor kick) (Drive: 13 plays, 74 yards, 5:10; Boston College 17-10)

Third quarter

- (12:06) GT – Haynes King 71-yard run (Aidan Birr kick) (Drive: 3 plays, 80 yards, 1:18; Tied 17-17)
- (02:08) GT – Avery Boyd 19-yard pass from Haynes King (Aidan Birr kick missed) (Drive: 8 plays, 89 yards, 3:26; Georgia Tech 23-17)

Fourth quarter

- (14:24) BC – Kye Robichaux 2-yard run (Liam Connor kick) (Drive: 6 plays, 72 yards, 2:38; Boston College 24-23)
- (08:44) BC – Thomas Castellanos 43-yard run (Liam Connor kick) (Drive: 7 plays, 72 yards, 3:09; Boston College 31-23)
- (07:24) BC – Kye Robichaux 3-yard run (Liam Connor kick) (Drive: 2 plays, 60 yards, 0:30; Boston College 38-23)

Top passers

- BC – Thomas Castellanos: 17/29, 255 yards, INT
- GT – Haynes King: 14/32, 204 yards, TD, 3 INT

Top rushers

- BC – Kye Robichaux: 21 carries, 165 yards, 2 TD
- GT – Haynes King: 10 carries, 150 yards, TD

Top receivers

- BC – Lewis Bond: 8 receptions, 72 yards
- GT – Christian Leary: 10 receptions, 54 yards

=== vs UConn ===
UConn Huskies (1–6) vs Boston College Eagles (4–3) – Game summary

Quarter	1	2	3	4	Total
Huskies	7	0	0	7	14
Eagles	7	7	7	0	21

at Alumni Stadium • Chestnut Hill, MA

- Date: October 28, 2023
- Game time: 12:03 p.m. EDT
- Game weather: Sunny, Wind E 6 MPH, 76 °F (24 °C)
- Game attendance: 36,902
- Referee: Jeff Flanagan
- TV announcers (ACCN): Chris Cotter (play-by-play), Mark Herzlich (color analyst), and Sherree Burruss (sideline)

Game information

First quarter

- UCONN – Stafford, Jelani 1 yd run (Ruelas, Noe kick), 4:26. Huskies 7–0. Drive: 9 plays, 51 yards, TOP 05:09
- BC – Robichaux, Kye 5 yd run (Connor, Liam kick), 0:09. Tied 7–7. Drive: 10 plays, 75 yards, TOP 04:17

Second quarter

- BC – Broome, Alex 6 yd pass from Castellanos, Thomas (Connor, Liam kick), 6:26. Eagles 14–7. Drive: 12 plays, 66 yards, TOP 06:02

Third quarter

- BC – Robichaux, Kye 13 yd run (Connor, Liam kick), 0:40. Eagles 21–7. Drive: 8 plays, 70 yards, TOP 04:44

Fourth quarter

- UCONN – Edwards, Cam 30 yd run (Ruelas, Noe kick), 13:51. Eagles 21–14. Drive: 7 plays, 78 yards, TOP 01:49

Top passers

- UCONN – Ta'Quan Roberson – 11/24, 130 yards
- BC – Thomas Castellanos – 16/24, 151 yards, TD

Top rushers

- UCONN – Cam Edwards – 16 carries, 89 yards, TD
- BC – Kye Robichaux – 23 carries, 112 yards, 2 TD

Top receivers

- UCONN – Geordon Porter – 3 receptions, 47 yards
- BC – Jaedn Skeete – 4 receptions, 61 yards

=== at Syracuse ===
Boston College Eagles (5–3) at Syracuse Orange (4–4) – Game summary

Quarter	1	2	3	4	Total
Eagles	3	7	0	7	17
Orange	7	0	0	3	10

at JMA Wireless Dome • Syracuse, NY

- Date: Friday, November 3, 2023
- Game time: 7:30 p.m. EDT
- Game weather: Indoor
- Game attendance: 42,523
- Referee: Stuart Mullins
- TV announcers (ESPN2): Anish Shroff (play-by-play), Andre Ware (analyst), and Paul Carcaterra (sideline)

Game information

First quarter

- (4:55) BC – Liam Connor 24 yd Field Goal (Drive: 10 plays, 44 yards, 4:03; BC 3–0)
- (0:33) SYR - Carlos Del Rio-Wilson 27 yd run (Brady Denaburg Kick) (Drive: 4 plays, 65 yards, 1:43; SYR 7-3)

Second quarter

- (0:48) BC - Owen McGowan 2 yd pass from Thomas Castellanos (Liam Connor Kick) (Drive: 18 plays, 80 yards, 7:59; BC 10-7)

Third quarter

No scoring plays

Fourth quarter

- (14:18) SYR - Brady Denaburg 36 yd Field Goal (Drive: 5 plays, 58 yards, 1:46; TIED 10-10)
- (2:23) BC - Thomas Castellanos 7 yd run (Liam Connor Kick) (Drive: 11 plays, 71 yards, 3:36; BC 17-10)

Top passers

- BC – Thomas Castellanos – 20/37, 165 yards, TD
- SYR – Carlos Del Rio-Wilson – 7/17, 37 yards, 4 INT

Top rushers

- BC – Thomas Castellanos – 22 carries, 87 yards, TD
- SYR – LeQuint Allen – 18 carries, 142 yards

Top receivers

- BC – Lewis Bond – 4 receptions, 48 yards
- SYR – Umari Hatcher – 3 receptions, 19 yards

=== vs Virginia Tech ===
Virginia Tech Hokies (4–5) vs Boston College Eagles (6–3) – Game summary

Quarter	1	2	3	4	Total
Hokies	10	21	7	10	48
Eagles	7	0	8	7	22

at Alumni Stadium • Chestnut Hill, MA

- Date: November 11, 2023
- Game time: 12:00 p.m. EDT
- Game weather: sunny • Temperature: 56 °F (13 °C)
- Game attendance: 33,665
- Referee: Mike Roche
- TV announcers (ACCN): Jorge Sedano (play-by-play), Orlando Franklin (analyst), and Marilyn Payne (sideline)

Game information

First Quarter

- (12:40) VT – John Love 27 yd Field Goal (Drive: 6 plays, 27 yards, 2:07; VT 3–0)
- (9:00) BC - Alex Broome 4 yd Rush (Liam Connor Kick) (Drive: 8 plays, 65 yards, 3:40; BC 7-3)
- (1:28) VT - Bhayshul Tuten 7 yd Rush (John Love Kick) (Drive: 11 plays, 69 yards, 6:14; VT 10-7)

Second Quarter

- (13:07) VT – Stephen Gosnell 22 yd Pass From Kyron Drones (John Love Kick) (Drive: 7 plays, 51 yards, 3:19; VT 17–7)
- (7:04) VT - Jaylin Lane 5 yd Pass From Kyron Drones (John Love Kick) (Drive: 4 plays, 75 yards, 1:50; VT 24-7)
- (1:33) VT - Bhayshul Tuten 4 yd Rush (John Love Kick) (Drive: 5 plays, 83 yards, 2:14; VT 31-7)

Third Quarter

- (8:50) VT - Bhayshul Tuten 4 yd Rush (John Love Kick) (Drive: 10 plays, 76 yards, 6:04; VT 38-7)
- (2:52) BC - Jaedn Skeete 8 yd Pass From Thomas Castellanos (Lewis Bond Pass) (Drive: 13 plays, 65 yards, 5:58; VT 38-15)

Fourth Quarter

- (14:53) VT - Malachi Thomas 35 yd Rush (John Love Kick) (Drive: 6 plays, 49 yards, 2:57; VT 45-15)
- (10:54) VT - John Love 46 yd Field Goal (Drive: 7 plays, 22 yards, 3:33; VT 48-15)
- (4:26) BC - Xavier Coleman 1 yd Rush (Liam Connor Kick) (Drive: 6 plays, 37 yards, 3:13; VT 48-22)

Top passers

- VT – Kyron Drones – 12/17, 219 yards, 2 TD
- BC – Thomas Castellanos – 10/20, 110 yards, TD

Top rushers

- VT – Kyron Drones – 20 carries, 135 yards
- BC – Alex Broome – 9 carries, 56 yards, TD

Top receivers

- VT – Da'Quan Felton – 4 receptions, 101 yards
- BC – Jeremiah Franklin – 3 receptions, 52 yards

=== at Pittsburgh ===
Boston College Eagles (0–0) at Pittsburgh Panthers (0–0) – Game summary

Quarter	1	2	3	4	Total
Eagles	0	0	0	0	0
Panthers	0	0	0	0	0

at Acrisure Stadium • Pittsburgh, PA

- Date: November 16, 2023
- Game time: 7:00 p.m.
- TV announcers (ESPN): Matt Barrie (play-by-play), Dan Mullen (analyst), and Harry Lyles Jr. (sideline)

Game information

First quarter

Second quarter

Third quarter

Fourth quarter

=== vs Miami (FL) ===
Miami Hurricanes (6–5) vs Boston College Eagles (6–5) – Game summary

Quarter	1	2	3	4	Total
Hurricanes	7	21	7	10	45
Eagles	7	0	7	6	20

at Alumni Stadium • Chestnut Hill, MA

- Date: Friday, November 24, 2023
- Game time: 12:00 p.m. EST
- Game weather: Clear • Temperature: 42 °F (6 °C)
- TV announcers (ABC): Matt Barrie (play-by-play), Dan Mullen (analyst), and Harry Lyles Jr. (sideline)

Game information

First quarter

- (9:55) BC – Kyle Robichaux 1-yard run, Liam Connor kick (Drive: 10 plays, 75 yards, 5:05; Boston College 7–0)
- (2:29) MIA – Mark Fletcher Jr. 1-yard run, Andres Borregales kick (Drive: 15 plays, 67 yards, 7:26; Tied 7–7)

Second quarter

- (12:49) MIA – Henry Parrish Jr. 15-yard run, Andres Borregales kick (Drive: 7 plays, 63 yards, 3:03; Miami 14–7)
- (4:00) MIA – Colbie Young 10-yard pass from Tyler Van Dyke, Andres Borregales kick (Drive: 10 plays, 69 yards, 4:32; Miami 21–7)
- (0:21) MIA – Henry Parrish Jr. 2-yard run, Andres Borregales kick (Drive: 6 plays, 71 yards, 2:02; Miami 28–7)

Third quarter

- (8:46) BC – Thomas Castellanos 21-yard run, Liam Connor kick (Drive: 8 plays, 51 yards, 3:44; Miami 28–14)
- (2:49) MIA – Jacolby George 4-yard pass from Tyler Van Dyke, Andres Borregales kick (Drive: 11 plays, 92 yards, 5:57; Miami 35–14)

Fourth quarter

- (8:36) MIA – Andres Borregales 26-yard field goal (Drive: 5 plays, 36 yards, 2:27; Miami 38–14)
- (5:50) BC – Lewis Bond 2-yard pass from Thomas Castellanos, two-point pass failed (Drive: 8 plays, 75 yards, 2:46; Miami 38–20)
- (1:07) MIA – Ajay Allen 30-yard run, Andres Borregales kick (Drive: 8 plays, 65 yards, 4:43; Miami 45–20)

Top passers

- MIA – Tyler Van Dyke – 23/36, 290 yards, 2 TD
- BC – Thomas Castellanos – 15/25, 151 yards, TD, 2 INT

Top rushers

- MIA – Henry Parrish Jr. – 11 carries, 111 yards, 2 TD
- BC – Thomas Castellanos – 19 carries, 130 yards, TD

Top receivers

- MIA – Xavier Restrepo – 6 receptions, 117 yards
- BC – Dino Tomlin – 3 receptions, 48 yards

=== vs SMU (Fenway Bowl) ===
No. 24 SMU Mustangs (11–2) vs. Boston College Eagles (6–6) (Fenway Bowl) – Game summary

Quarter	1	2	3	4	Total
No. 24 Mustangs	0	14	0	0	14
Eagles	3	7	0	13	23

at Fenway Park, Boston, Massachusetts

- Date: December 28
- Game time: 10:00 a.m. CST/11:00 a.m. EST a.m.
- Game weather: Rain, 45 °F (7 °C)
- Game attendance: 16,238
- Referee: Kevin Mar
- TV announcers (ESPN/Bowl Season Radio): Chris Cotter (play-by-play), Mark Herzlich (analyst), and Sherree Burruss (sideline)/Travis Jones (play-by-play), John Denton (analyst), and Molly Cotten (sideline)

Game information

First quarter

- BC – Liam Connor 45-yard field goal, 6:21. Eagles 3–0. Drive: 8 plays, 25 yards, 3:42.

Second quarter

- SMU – L. J. Johnson Jr. 1-yard run (Collin Rogers kick), 9:14. Mustangs 7–3. Drive: 15 plays, 78 yards, 6:32.
- BC – Kye Robichaux 6-yard run (Liam Connor kick), 3:07. Eagles 10–7. Drive: 10 plays, 77 yards, 6:07.
- SMU – Jaylan Knighton 6-yard pass from Kevin Jennings (Collin Rogers kick), 0:08. Mustangs 14–10. Drive: 10 plays, 55 yards, 2:59.

Third quarter

- No scoring plays

Fourth quarter

- BC – Thomas Castellanos 15-yard run (Liam Connor kick), 12:22. Eagles 17–14. Drive: 8 plays, 72 yards, 3:59.
- BC – Thomas Castellanos 14-yard run (kick failed), 9:48. Eagles 23–14. Drive: 3 plays, 42 yards, 1:19.

Top passers

- SMU – Kevin Jennings – 24/48, 191 yards, TD
- BC – Thomas Castellanos – 11/18, 102 yards, INT

Top rushers

- SMU – Kevin Jennings – 10 carries, 51 yards
- BC – Thomas Castellanos – 21 carries, 156 yards, 2 TD

Top receivers

- SMU – Jake Bailey – 6 receptions, 54 yards
- BC – Jaeden Skeete – 2 receptions, 40 yards

== Players drafted into the NFL ==
Round	Pick	Player	Position	NFL club
3	90	Elijah Jones	CB	Arizona Cardinals
6	210	Christian Mahogany	OG	Detroit Lions
