= 2023 Fenway Bowl =

Postseason college football bowl game

2023 Wasabi Fenway Bowl
- 2nd Fenway Bowl
SMU Mustangs	Boston College Eagles
(11–2)	(6–6)
The American	ACC
14	23
Head coach: Rhett Lashlee	Head coach: Jeff Hafley
AP / Coaches / CFP; 17 / 19 / 24
	1	2	3	4	Total
SMU	0	14	0	0	14
Boston College	3	7	0	13	23
- Date: December 28, 2023
- Season: 2023
- Stadium: Fenway Park
- Location: Boston, Massachusetts
- MVP: Thomas Castellanos (QB, Boston College) & Kam Arnold (LB, Boston College)
- Favorite: SMU by 10.5
- Referee: Kevin Mar (Big 12)
- Halftime show: Boston College Marching Band, SMU Mustang Band
- Attendance: 16,238

United States TV coverage
- Network: ESPN
- Announcers: Chris Cotter (play-by-play), Mark Herzlich (analyst), and Sherree Burruss (sideline)

The 2023 Fenway Bowl was a college football bowl game played on December 28, 2023, at Fenway Park in Boston, Massachusetts. The second edition of the Fenway Bowl featured SMU from the American Athletic Conference (The American) and Boston College from the Atlantic Coast Conference (ACC). The game began at approximately 11:00 a.m. EST and aired on ESPN. The Fenway Bowl was one of the 2023–24 bowl games concluding the 2023 FBS football season. The game was sponsored by cloud storage company Wasabi Technologies and was officially known as the Wasabi Fenway Bowl.

== Teams ==
Consistent with conference tie-ins, the game featured Boston College from the Atlantic Coast Conference (ACC) and SMU from the American Athletic Conference (The American). This was the second meeting between Boston College and SMU, their prior meeting being a 31–29 SMU victory in 1986.

The Eagles and Mustangs entered the game due to become conference opponents starting with the 2024 season, as SMU committed to join the ACC.

=== Boston College ===
Boston College finished the regular season 6–6, going 3–5 in ACC conference play. This was the Eagles' first appearance in a bowl game since the 2020 Birmingham Bowl, which they lost.

=== SMU ===
SMU finished the regular season 11–2, going 8–0 in conference play in The American. The Mustangs defeated the then 22nd-ranked Tulane, 26–14, in the AAC Championship Game, the program's first conference title since 1984 when it won a share of the Southwest Conference title. The Mustangs entered the bowl 17th in the AP poll and 24th in the College Football Playoff rankings.

This was the Mustangs' second-straight bowl appearance, having appeared in the 2022 New Mexico Bowl, which they lost.

== Game summary ==
2023 Wasabi Fenway Bowl

Quarter	1	2	3	4	Total
No. 24 SMU	0	14	0	0	14
Boston College	3	7	0	13	23

at Fenway Park • Boston, Massachusetts

- Date: Thursday, December 28, 2023
- Game time: 11:00 a.m. EST
- Game weather: Rain • Temperature: approx. 40 °F (4 °C) • Wind: approx. 20 mph (32 km/h)
- Game attendance: 16,238
- Referee: Kevin Mar
- TV announcers (ESPN): Chris Cotter (play-by-play), Mark Herzlich (analyst), and Sherree Burruss (sideline)
- Box score

Game information

First Quarter

- (6:21) BC – Liam Connor 45 yard field goal (Drive: 8 plays, 25 yards, 3:42; Boston College 3–0)

Second Quarter

- (9:14) SMU – LJ Johnson Jr. 1 yard run, Collin Rogers kick (Drive: 15 plays, 78 yards, 6:32; SMU 7–3)
- (3:07) BC – Kye Robichaux 6 yard run, Liam Connor kick (Drive: 10 plays, 77 yards, 6:07; Boston College 10–7)
- (0:08) SMU – Jaylan Knighton 6 yard pass from Kevin Jennings, Collin Rogers kick (Drive: 10 plays, 55 yards, 2:59; SMU 14–10)

Third Quarter

- No scoring plays.

Fourth Quarter

- (12:22) BC – Thomas Castellanos 15 yard run, Liam Connor kick (Drive: 8 plays, 72 yards, 3:59; Boston College 17–14)
- (9:48) BC – Thomas Castellanos 14 yard run, Liam Connor PAT failed (Drive: 3 plays, 42 yards, 1:19; Boston College 23–14)

=== Statistics ===
Statistics	SMU	BC
First downs	22	20
Plays–yards	79–309	59–365
Rushes–yards	31–118	41–263
Passing yards	191	102
Passing: comp–att–int	24–48–0	11–18–1
Time of possession	32:30	27:28

Team	Category	Player	Statistics
SMU	Passing	Kevin Jennings	24/48, 191 yards, 1 TD
SMU	Rushing	Kevin Jennings	10 carries, 51 yards
SMU	Receiving	Jake Bailey	6 receptions, 54 yards
Boston College	Passing	Thomas Castellanos	11/18, 102 yards, 1 INT
Boston College	Rushing	Thomas Castellanos	21 carries, 155 yards, 2 TD
Boston College	Receiving	Jaedn Skeete	2 receptions, 40 yards
