= Sean Duggan =

Sean Duggan may refer to:

- Seánie Duggan (1922–2013), Irish hurler
- Sean Duggan (American football) (born 1993), American football coach
