= Matt Thurin =

American football coach (born 1984)

Current position
- Title: Special teams coordinator
- Team: Boston College
- Conference: ACC

Biographical details
- Born: June 27, 1984 (age 42); Canton, Ohio, U.S.
- Education: Baldwin-Wallace College; University of Akron

Playing career
- 2003: Baldwin-Wallace Yellow Jackets
- Position: Defensive end

Coaching career (HC unless noted)
- 2004–2006: Baldwin-Wallace (SA)
- 2007: Walsh (GA)
- 2008–2010: Akron (GA)
- 2011: Colorado (GA)
- 2012–2014: Columbia (ST/DB)
- 2015–2019: Ohio State (DQC)
- 2020–present: Boston College (STC/S)

Matthew Thurin (born June 27, 1984) is an American football coach and former player. He is currently the special teams coordinator at Boston College. He has also coached at Baldwin-Wallace College, Walsh University, the University of Akron, University of Colorado, and Ohio State University.

== Coaching career ==
=== Baldwin-Wallace ===
Thurin began coaching immediately following a career-ending injury as a player. As a student assistant at Baldwin-Wallace, Thurin worked with all levels of the defense. He focused on the defensive line and linebackers in 2004 and 2005, before working with the defensive back in 2006.

=== Walsh ===
Thurin spent the 2007 season as an offensive graduate assistant with the Walsh Cavaliers. He worked closely with the offensive line and tight ends.

=== Akron ===
In 2008, Thurin got his first opportunity at the Division I level when he joined J. D. Brookhart’s staff at Akron as a defensive graduate assistant, working with the linebackers. After two seasons under Brookhart, he was retained by new head coach Rob Ianello for the 2010 season.

=== Colorado ===
In March 2011, Thurin was hired by Jon Embree as an offensive graduate assistant at Colorado. He worked with all facets of the offense under offensive coordinator Eric Bieniemy and pass game coordinator, J. D. Brookhart.

=== Columbia ===
In 2012, Thurin was hired to his first full-time coaching position at the Division I level when Pete Mangurian hired him as the special teams coordinator and defensive backs coach at Columbia.

=== Ohio State ===
From 2015 – 2019, Thurin worked for Urban Meyer and Ryan Day at Ohio State as quality control coach, working with the safeties on defense and the special teams units. Thurin helped lead the Buckeyes to three straight Big Ten Conference championships, as well as victories in the Rose Bowl, Cotton Bowl, and Fiesta Bowl.

=== Boston College ===
On January 17, 2020, Thurin was hired as the special teams coordinator and safeties coach at Boston College by new head coach Jeff Hafley. Hafley and Thurin spent the 2019 season on staff together at Ohio State, where Hafley was the co-defensive coordinator. In his first season at BC, Thurin made a major impact in the improvement of the Eagles's special teams. Aaron Boumerhi converted 16-of-20 of his field goal attempts while Grant Carlson averaged over 42 yards per punt, including 15 punts pinned inside the 20-yard line. Boston College finished 34th nationally in field goal percentage in 2020, the best finish for the Eagles since 2013.

Thurin's special teams played a major role in the Eagles’ fast start to the 2021 season. Boston College started the season with wins over Colgate, UMass, Temple, and Missouri, and the Eagles special teams contributed 61 yards per kickoff return, over 45 yards per punt, as well as started the year 2 for 2 on field goals.

== Playing career ==
Thurin was a decorated two sport athlete in high school, lettering three times each in football and baseball at Louisville High School in Louisville, Ohio. He was also a team captain in both sports, as well as earning all-county and all-conference honors in football.

Following high school, Thurin continued his athletic career as a two sport athlete at Baldwin-Wallace College, playing defensive end on the football team and outfield and first base on the football team, before an injury forced him in to coaching early.

== Personal life ==
Thurin earned his bachelor's degree from Baldwin-Wallace College in early childhood education in 2007, and his master's degree in education from the University of Akron in 2009.

He and his wife, Elizabeth, have a daughter and son.
