= Peruna =

Collegiate Mascot

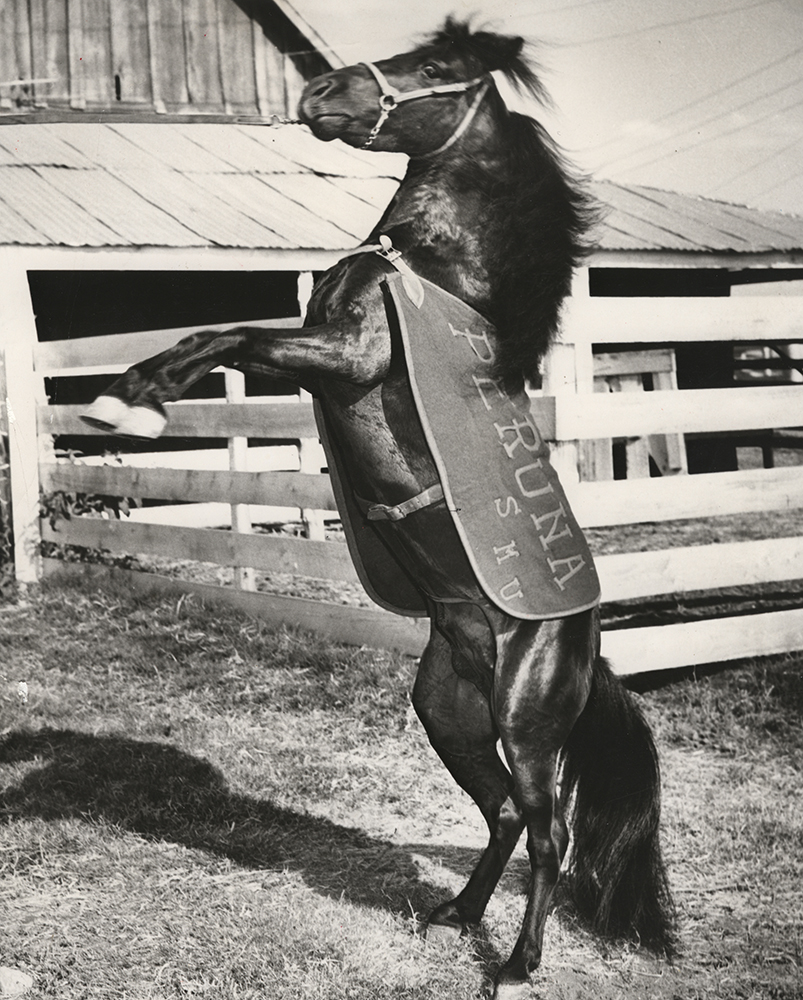
- Peruna III
- University: Southern Methodist University
- Conference: ACC
- Description: Shetland Pony
- First seen: 1932

Peruna is the official mascot and fight song of the Southern Methodist University (SMU) Mustangs, named after Peruna, a popular patent medicine (18 percent alcohol). The name "Peruna" is given to each successive live mascot. The mascot debuted in 1932, and since then a black Shetland pony, Peruna, has been present at every SMU home football game except for one. The costumed mascot is also referred to as "Peruna." Peruna was selected the #10 Best College Mascot by America's Best and Top Ten in 2009.

== History ==
On November 4, 1932, Peruna I made his first mascot appearance, appearing at the SMU football game against Texas A&M University. Peruna I was a four-year old, 150-pound pony that was donated by T.E. Jones, the owner of Arlington Downs racetrack. Cy Barcus, a 1929 graduate of Perkins School of Theology and director of the Mustang Band, introduced the black Shetland pony as the mascot and volunteered the name Peruna, which was already the name of the school Fight Song. In the March 22, 1985, edition of The Daily Campus, Barcus related his story to Linda Beheler: “I was out on a picnic and saw a little black horse running through the high weeds and I said, ‘that would make a good mascot for SMU.’ So I went to coach Ray Morrison and said, ‘Ray, I’ve found a horse that I think would make a good mascot,’ and he told me to bring it to the pep meeting. So I got a popular [student] to bring the pony to the pep rally and from then on it became the official school mascot.” On Halloween 1934, Peruna I escaped from his on-campus living quarters and was struck and killed by an automobile on Mockingbird Lane. The event devastated the SMU community and sent the university into mourning.

Since then, the university has moved Peruna's living quarters from campus to a Dallas-area ranch. Nine Perunas have represented SMU's athletic teams. The most recent to be retired was Peruna VIII, in 2011. Peruna VIII represented the school from 1997 until 2011. After he was retired from the field, Peruna VIII continued to represent the school on The Boulevard, the tailgating area for football games for one season while Peruna IX was in training. Peruna IX has represented the school since October 15, 2011.

Following the death of Peruna I, W.E. Culwell (owner of Culwell and Sons) began a tradition of supplying SMU’s mascot. The Culwell family has donated and cared for Peruna II-Peruna IX. According to Culwell’s son, C.W. "Cully" Culwell (’54), “He (Dad) would go to every game and serve barbecue to the players after the game; he really loved the school….Dad donated a Shetland pony because they have a greater longevity than a Quarter Horse.” (Shetlands will normally live 25 years or more, while a Quarter Horse will only live 15–18 years.) His generosity continued until his death in 1964 and has been continued by the Culwell family. Until 1993, the mascot was stabled on the 500-acre (2.0 km^{2}) Culwell Ranch in Grapevine. Since then, the stabling location has been kept a secret. To date, nine mascots have represented SMU...seven stallions and two mares, although hard-core types prefer all-black stallions because of their alleged vitality and spirit. When Cully Culwell was having difficulty locating a black stallion to replace Peruna VI, he shared, “stallions are hard to obtain now because most young male horses are castrated to make them tamer….a stallion which is more aggressive, better represents the spirit of the SMU Mustangs.”

== Naming ==
The first football teams at SMU were unofficially known as the "Parsons" because of the large number of theology students on the team, but after SMU won a state championship in women's basketball, it was determined that the university's teams needed an official mascot. Bulls, Rams, Comanches and Rattlers were among the names submitted by members of the student body. The list was narrowed to three finalists, and at a pep assembly on October 17, 1917, the name "Mustangs" was selected over Bisons and Greyhounds. The contributor of the winning symbol was Miss Dorothy Amann, President Hyer's secretary. She was struck by the idea while watching the team practice from her office in Dallas Hall: "Why, out there, on the football field, it looks just like a bunch of wild Mustangs!". The mustang is representative of the fleet-footed animal which is native to Texas.

The name Peruna originated in the fall of 1915 when SMU student George Sexton substituted the words, "She'll be loaded with Peruna when she comes ..." to the tune of "Coming 'Round the Mountain." In the early part of the century, Peruna was the name of the most famous elixir in Texas and had a reputation as a cure-all. The popularity of Peruna soared during Prohibition due to the high alcohol content allowed for "medicinal" purposes. Peruna happens to mean "potato" in Finnish.

== Perunas ==
=== Peruna I (1932–1934) ===
The first mascot was a 28” high, 150-pound pony donated by T.E. Jones of Arlington Downs. The feisty miniature black stallion made his first appearance at a pep rally, November 4, 1932. He was promptly named ‘Peruna’ after a popular patent medicine (18 percent alcohol). Legend has it that the medicine was ‘full of kick’, as was SMU's first mascot. He was kept on campus under the care of an organization called “The Saddle Burrs”.

A week before Peruna I's death, he traveled to New York for the Fordham game where a city cab was his mode of travel. At the time, Bob Goodrich (who later became

Peruna I - 1933

a Methodist Bishop) was the Band Director and took his younger brother, Wilson, on the trip as a ‘Shovel Boy’ for Peruna.

On October 30, 1934, a Tuesday evening, Peruna I was hit on Mockingbird by a speeding motorist and killed. The next day, the student body president (Finis Crutchfield ’37), along with the leader of the Mustang Band (Robert Goodrich ’35), led the procession from the flagpole to the burial site near Ownby Stadium. For the processional, the Mustang Band played ‘Peruna’ (Coming 'Round the Mountain) as a dirge. Fordham University, represented by the football team captain and the campus newspaper editor, sent condolences via telegram and Rameses VI, the Fordham mascot, was said to be sullen by his keeper. In 1937, a statue (currently on Peruna Plaza at Ford Stadium) was sculpted by Michael G. Owen Jr. (’37) and placed at the burial site of Peruna I.

Bob Hope and Gracie Allen meet Peruna II at the Mustangs' appearance in the 1935 Rose Bowl.

=== Peruna II (1934–1943) ===
Peruna II, a black Shetland pony raised at the Culwell Ranch, marked the beginning of the Culwell connection. Peruna II was the first of two mares to serve as mascot. The mare had a white diamond on her forehead that was dyed black to protect the image. She died of blood poisoning after being kicked and injured by another horse.

Peruna III at the Peruna I Memorial Statue

=== Peruna III (1943–1947) ===
During Peruna III's reign, the Culwells purchased Peruna his own special red and blue trailer. It served to transport all subsequent Perunas until 2002 when a new trailer was purchased.

=== Peruna IV (1947–1949) ===
Peruna IV, the second mare, led the Mustangs to two consecutive Southwest Conference championships. She died of a jaw infection in the summer of 1949. Gene Gaddy (’50) recalls that, because of his role on the Student Council, he was called back from summer break to serve as a pallbearer for Peruna IV. She was buried on the then practice field (now Wescott Field) draped in a blanket.

=== Peruna V (1950–1965) ===
During the fifteen-year reign of Peruna V, he gained a reputation of arrogance. His lively prancing, rearing and biting were good examples of SMU’s fighting spirit. Toward the end of his reign he kicked out the side of his stall (which happened to be the baggage car) on his way to Lubbock. In Chicago for the 1953 Notre Dame game, Peruna V was put up at the posh Stevens Hotel, had elevator privileges, and drank from the washbasin while being cared for by Burl Luscombe. Alys and George A. Richards, a former Peruna Handler, recalled a story from 1959 when they were hauling Peruna to a University of Texas game. As they drove, the radio programming was interrupted to inform the audience that Peruna had been “horse napped” by UT students who would display him at the game the next day. They continued to Austin and arrived at the game with Peruna in tow. The UT student body was surprised to see the real Peruna parade in because the wrong stolen horse was there also....minus its tail and mane.

=== Peruna VI (1965–1986) ===
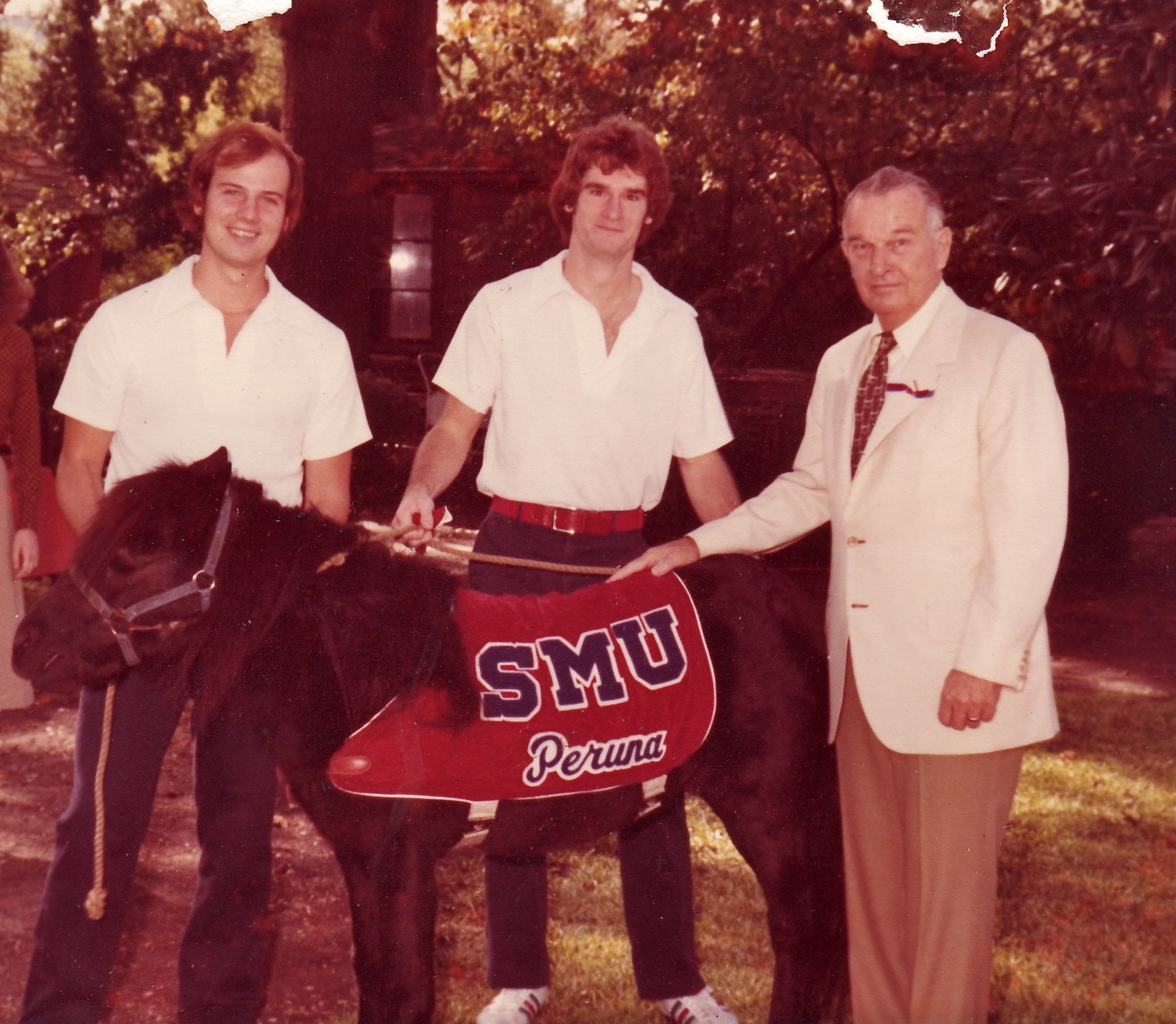
Peruna VI with Texas governor Bill Clements and handlers Robert Miller and James P Wilson 1979

Peruna VI started his tenure as an 18-month-old on October 2, 1965 at the Cotton Bowl when SMU played Purdue. He served for 21 years until a liver ailment forced him out of action. He had the longest tenure, to date, of any mascot, running home games at the Cotton Bowl and, later, at Texas Stadium in addition to running at most all of the other Southwest Conference venues. After death, Peruna VI was buried at Ownby Stadium at a secret night service. When Ownby Stadium was demolished, Peruna VI's remains were the only ones recovered. His ashes now rest under the statue at Peruna Plaza at Gerald J. Ford Stadium’s south end.

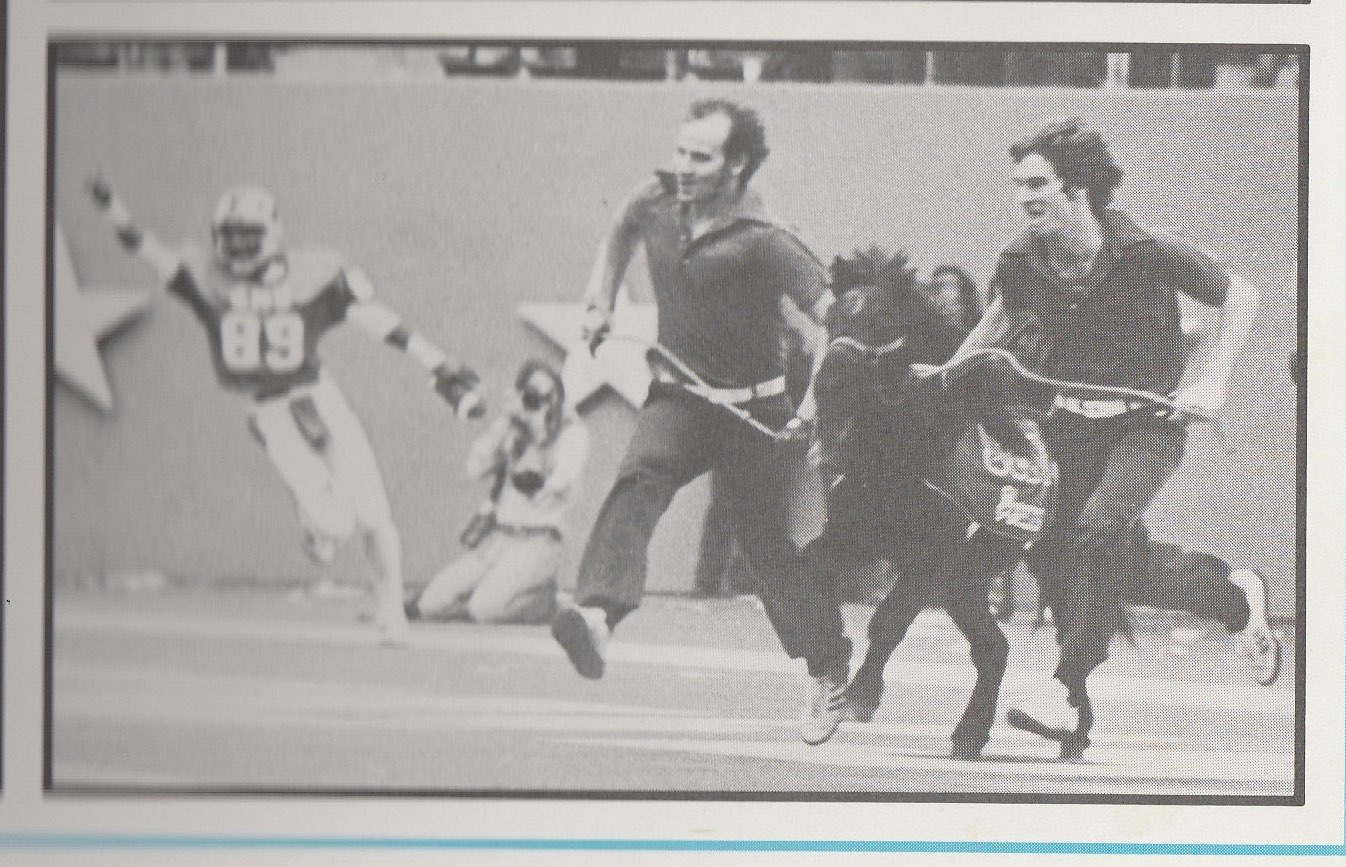
Peruna VI at Texas Stadium October, 1979

=== Peruna VII (1986–1997) ===
Peruna VII arrived at the Culwell ranch a year before his reign began. At the beginning of his reign, Cully Culwell said, “We would have like to have run Peruna VII a year earlier, but he proved to be a tough horse to break…..He’s still a little skittish at times, but he’s full of fight!” Peruna VII was to make his debut during the Homecoming game, but due to Peruna VI's illness, his first showing came at the SMU/TCU game on September 27. During the summer of 1986, Peruna VII broke his leg when he caught his hoof under the gate of the stall. “Under normal circumstances, a horse would be put down,” said Cully Cullwell. The healing process was expensive but enabled him to continue his service to the university. The two years of rest through the Death Penalty, assisted in his healing, though he was retired early due to increasingly more frequent shots to reduce swelling before games. His retirement found him living on a ranch until his liver began to fail in May 2002 and he was euthanized. His ashes are currently in a coffin awaiting a resting spot in SMU's Heritage Hall when it is funded.

=== Peruna VIII (1997–2011) ===
Peruna VIII ‘exchanged reins’ at the Spirit and Traditions Pep Rally at the beginning of the 1997 school year. Peruna VIII is a spirited lean black stallion that immediately made his mark by dragging and tripping several of the Peruna Handlers. He began his service on the field at the Cotton Bowl and was the first mascot to initiate the playing field at the new Gerald J. Ford Stadium. After a long road trip to Washington, D.C., Peruna VIII led The Mustang Band in President George W. Bush’s Inauguration Parade. Peruna VIII's infectious, untamed spirit is demonstrated before every game and as stamps and whinnies as the Mustang Band forms a tunnel and he waits impatiently to lead the players on to the field. Peruna VIII was retired on October 15, 2011. At the beginning of his final season, Peruna VIII made one last mark on the Peruna legacy by killing a goat at his ranch.

=== Peruna IX (2011–present) ===
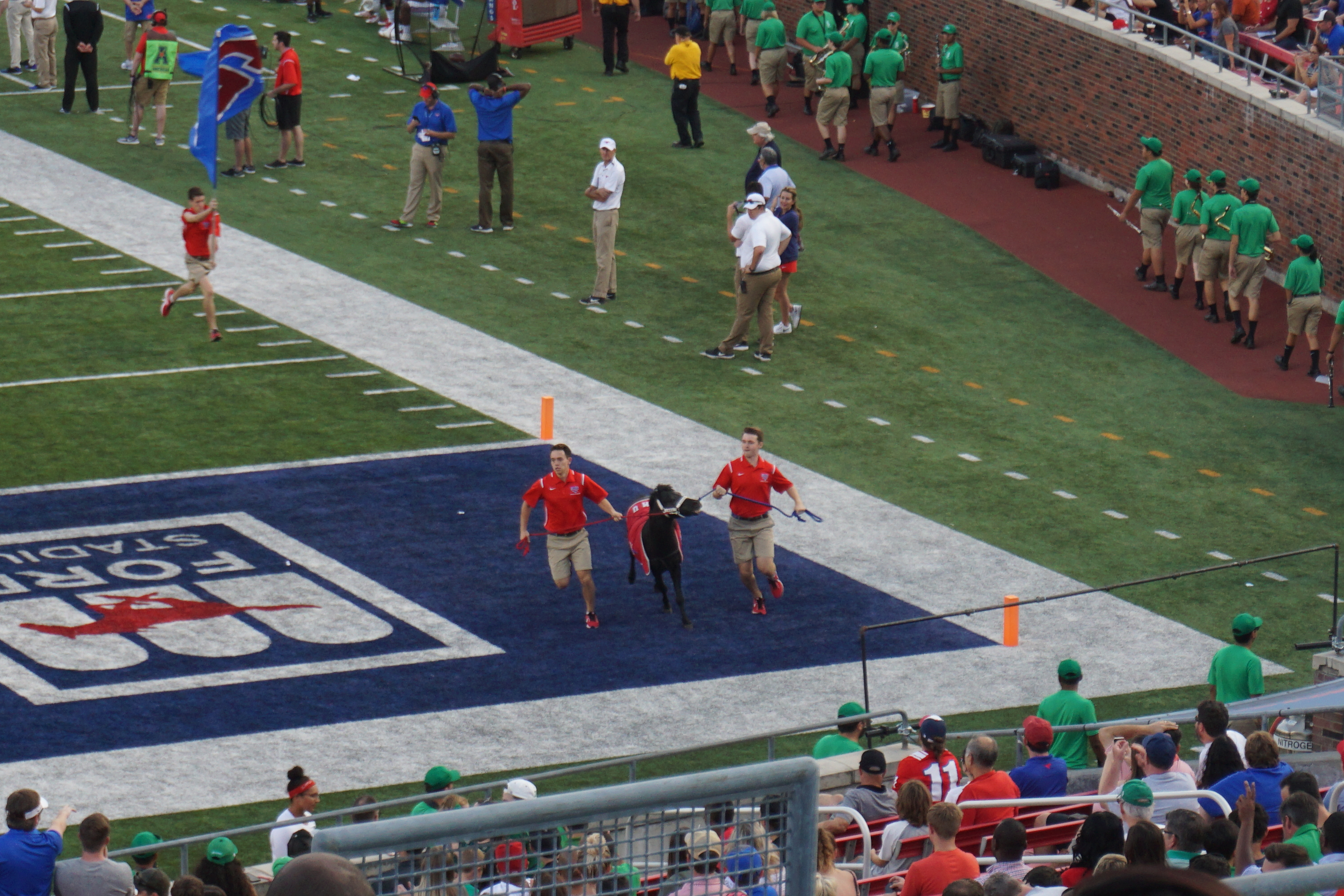
Peruna IX during a 2017 SMU Mustangs football game

Peruna IX took over for Peruna VIII at halftime October 15, 2011 at the SMU vs. Central Florida football game at SMU's Ford Stadium. Peruna IX had been groomed for the job since selection as a colt. Peruna IX was found by the Culwells mere days before he was scheduled for castration and was spared in order to become SMU's next stallion mascot. The rough-and-tumble stallion attended summer band practices during 2011 to become adjusted to game noise. Already, Peruna IX has made a name for himself as one of the most vocal Perunas to date: his whinnying can be heard across the stadium. Peruna IX can be seen rearing up on the sidelines as his team plays on the field. He runs free at a secret location when not representing the Mustangs.

== Appearances and traditions ==
- Since 1932 Peruna has been present at every SMU home football game, spanning four stadiums. Peruna has been present at the Cotton Bowl, Texas Stadium, Ownby Stadium and Gerald J. Ford Stadium.
- Peruna Plaza is located at the south end of Gerald J. Ford Stadium. It serves as a memorial to late Perunas and contains the remains of at least a couple. There is a statue sculpted by Michael G. Owen Jr. (’37), resembling a small horse resting its head, in honor of Peruna I.
- During football games, Peruna waits behind the Mustangs' end zone to watch his team drive to score. After touchdowns (as well as at the end of each quarter and the end of the first half), Peruna and his handlers run across the field to the opposite end zone.
- While a member of the Southwest Conference, SMU ran Peruna across the field after every Mustang score. After joining the Western Athletic Conference in 1996, this practice was disallowed by the conference commissioner, who allowed Peruna to be run only after each quarter.
- According to SMU legend, Peruna killed the mascot of the Fordham Rams after the Fordham handlers led Ramses the Ram too close to the Mustang, killing it instantly with a kick to the head. SMU sources disagree as to which Peruna did this, putting the reliability of this incident in question.

Other notable incidents involving Peruna are when he sent the University of Texas Longhorn Bevo to the ground with a kick in the side, and defecated at midfield during a TCU - SMU game, the week that TCU unveiled the school's brand new Field Turf.

- Peruna is also noted for having spent the night in every one of SMU's Panhellenic sorority houses, and traveling to New York with the Mustang Band, where he was given his own cab, his own elevator, and his own hotel suite.
- Peruna is present at both the commencement of incoming freshmen, and the graduation of seniors.
- During the early days of the Mustang Band, Peruna accompanied the organization everywhere, appearing on theater playbills as "the midget wonder horse!"
