= Sean Duggan (American football) =

American football coach (born 1993)

Miami Dolphins
- Title: Defensive coordinator

Personal information
- Born: April 7, 1993 (age 33); Cincinnati, Ohio, U.S.
- Listed height: 6 ft 4 in (1.93 m)
- Listed weight: 250 lb (113 kg)

Career information
- Position: Linebacker
- High school: St. Xavier (OH)
- College: Boston College (2011–2014)

Career history
- Boston College (2015) Graduate assistant; Hawaii (2016–2017) Linebackers coach; UMass (2018) Linebackers coach; Ohio State (2019) Graduate assistant; Boston College (2020–2022) Linebackers coach; Boston College (2023) Co-defensive coordinator & linebackers coach; Green Bay Packers (2024) Defensive assistant; Green Bay Packers (2025) Linebackers coach; Miami Dolphins (2026–present) Defensive coordinator
- Coaching profile at Pro Football Reference

Sean Kevin Duggan (born April 7, 1993) is an American football coach who is the defensive coordinator for the Miami Dolphins of the National Football League (NFL).

== Education ==
Duggan is a 2011 graduate of St. Xavier High School in Cincinnati. He went on to attend Boston College.

== Playing career ==
Duggan played at Boston College for four years. In those four years he was a team captain and put up 115 tackles, 6.5 going for a loss, two interceptions, two pass deflections, a forced fumble, and a fumble recovery.

== Coaching career ==
=== Boston College ===
Duggan started his coaching career with Boston College as a defensive graduate assistant for one year.

=== Hawaii ===
After Boston College, Duggan would take a coaching position at Hawaii as the team's linebackers coach. During the 2017 season while coaching a game against Western Carolina, Duggan suffered a bizarre injury as when Viane Moala blocked a field goal, Duggan celebrated with Moala by chest bumping him. However Moala would knock Duggan to the ground dislocating his elbow and fracturing his wrist.

=== UMass ===
After two years with Hawaii, Duggan would move on to UMass to be the linebackers coach.

=== Ohio State ===
After one year with UMass, Duggan would leave for Ohio State to become a graduate assistant.

=== Boston College (second stint) ===
After one season with the Buckeyes, Duggan would return to Boston College as the team's linebackers coach. In the 2021 season as the linebackers coach for Boston College, Duggan would be named a top 30 coach under the age of 30 by 247Sports. After two season as the linebackers coach for Boston College, Duggan would be promoted to co-defensive coordinator while also maintaining his linebacker coaching position.

=== Green Bay Packers ===
On January 31, 2024, Duggan's head coach at Boston College, Jeff Hafley, was hired by the Green Bay Packers to be their defensive coordinator. On March 12, Duggan was hired as a defensive assistant by the Packers.

On February 3, 2025, linebackers coach Anthony Campanile was hired by the Jacksonville Jaguars to be their defensive coordinator. Packers defensive coordinator Jeff Hafley subsequently named Duggan as the Packers' new linebackers coach.

=== Miami Dolphins ===
On January 29, 2026, Duggan followed Hafley to the Miami Dolphins to serve as the team's defensive coordinator.
