= Steve Shimko =

American football coach (born 1990)

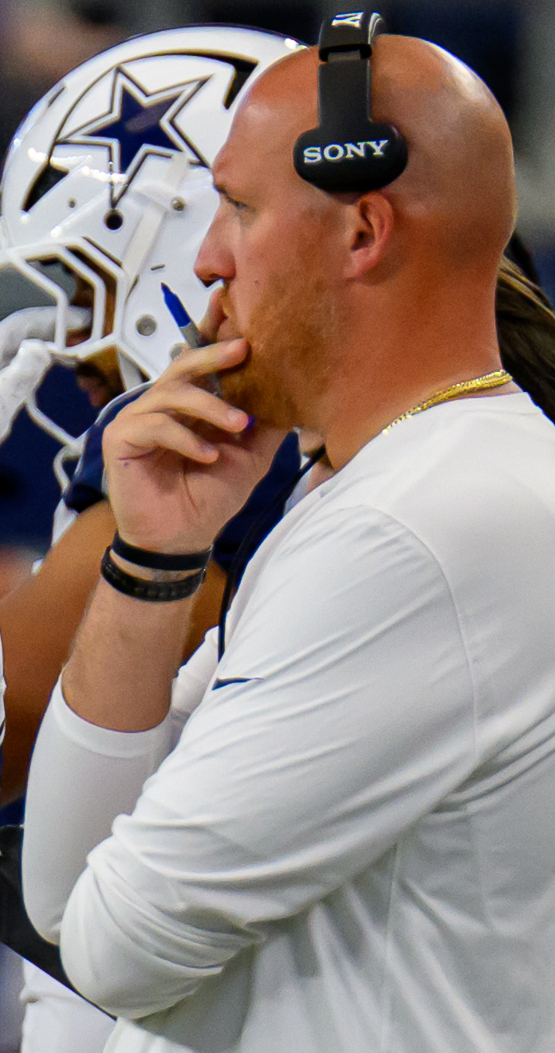
- Shimko in 2025

Dallas Cowboys
- Title: Quarterbacks coach

Personal information
- Born: January 31, 1990 (age 36); Ewing Township, New Jersey, U.S.

Career information
- Position: Quarterback
- High school: Ewing
- College: Rutgers (2008–2010)

Career history
- Rutgers (2011–2013) Graduate assistant; Western Michigan (2014) Recruiting operations; Georgia (2015) Graduate assistant; Garden City (2016–2017) Offensive coordinator & quarterbacks coach; Seattle Seahawks (2018–2019); Offensive analyst (2018); Assistant quarterbacks coach (2019); Boston College (2020–2023); Tight ends coach (2020-2021); Quarterbacks coach (2022); Offensive coordinator & quarterbacks coach (2023); Dallas Cowboys (2024-present); Offensive assistant (2024); Quarterbacks coach (2025-present)

Steve Shimko (born January 31, 1990) is an American football coach and former player who is the quarterbacks coach for the Dallas Cowboys of the National Football League (NFL).

== Early life ==
Shimko grew up in Ewing Township, New Jersey and attended Ewing High School. Shimko chose to play college football at Rutgers.

== College career ==
Shimko played at Rutgers for three years, appearing in one game and not recording any statistics. Shimko's career would end early as he injured his shoulder, which required surgery and forced him to miss his senior season.

== Coaching career ==
However Shimko would still be a part of the Rutgers football program as he would become a graduate assistant. After three years with Rutgers, Shimko would be hired as the recruiting operator for Western Michigan. The next stop for Shimko would come as a graduate assistant for Georgia where he would coach for one year. Shimko would then be hired as the offensive coordinator and quarterback coach at Garden City. After two season with Garden City, Shimko would receive his first NFL coaching job, being hired by the Seattle Seahawks as their assistant quarterback coach. After two season with the Seahawk, Shimko would leave to become the tight ends coach at Boston College. After two years as tight ends coach for Boston College, he would become their QB coach for the 2022 season. Then after three seasons for Boston College, two as their tight ends coach, and one as their quarterbacks coach, Shimko was promoted to be the Eagles offensive coordinator.

On February 21, 2024, Shimko was hired as the offensive assistant for the Dallas Cowboys. On February 10, 2025, Shimko was promoted to quarterbacks coach following Scott Tolzien's departure.
