= Southern Methodist University Mustang Band =

College marching band in Dallas, Texas

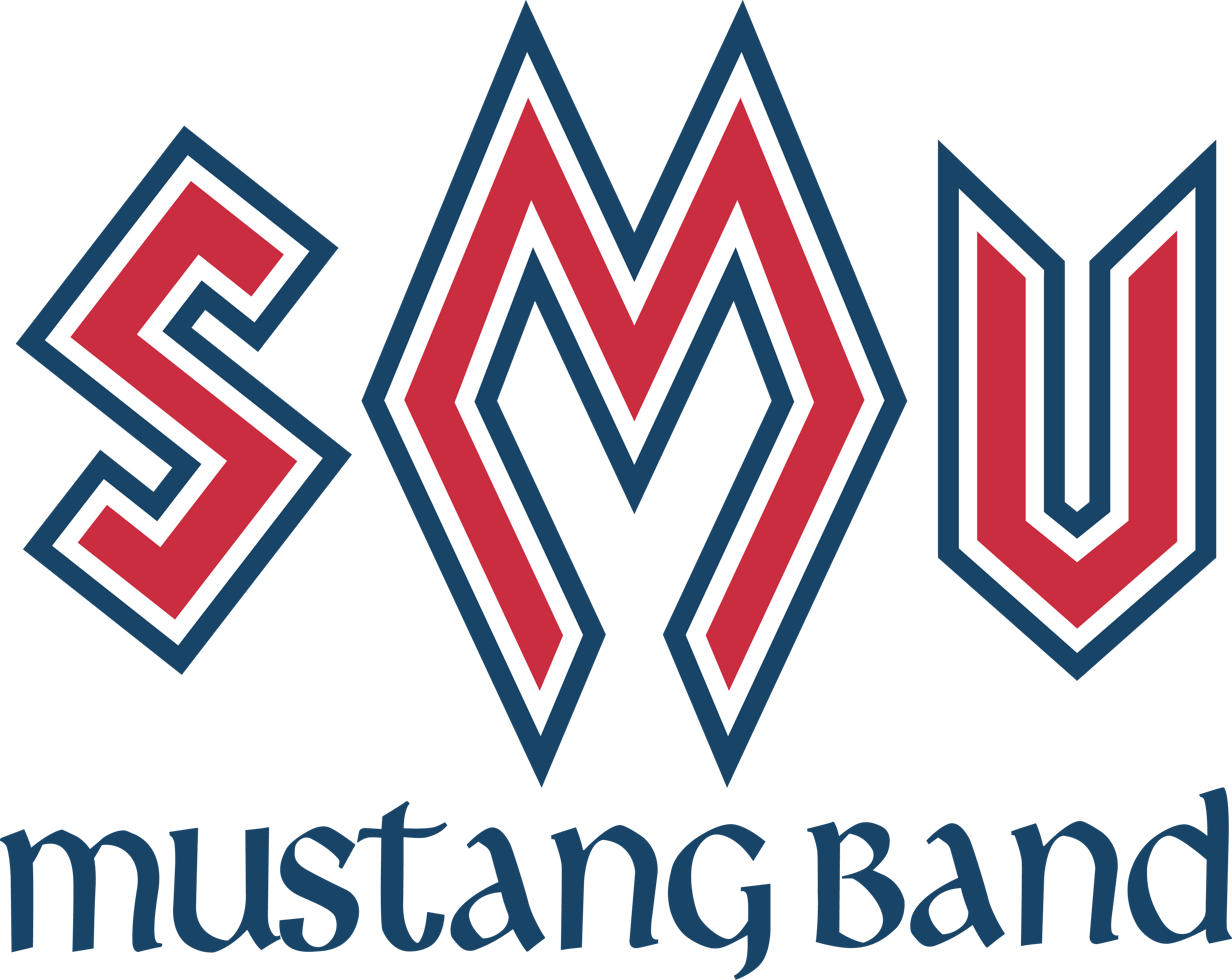
- School: Southern Methodist University
- Location: Dallas, Texas
- Conference: Atlantic Coast Conference
- Founded: 1917
- Director: Charles Aguillon
- Assistant Director: Paul Crockett
- Members: ~111 active, 1000+ alumni
- Practice field: SMU Indoor Performance Center
- Fight song: "Peruna and Pony Battle Cry"

The SMU Mustang Band, known as "the Hub of SMU Spirit" or the "Best Dressed Band in the Land" because of its 32 unique uniforms, is the marching band of Southern Methodist University. The band represents the University at football games, produces the Pigskin Revue during Homecoming, and performs at special university and community-related events. Founded in 1917, the Mustang Band is currently under the direction of Director Charles Aguillon, Assistant Director Paul Crockett, and Drumline Instructor Jon Lee.

The SMU Mustang Band introduced jazz into its performances in the late 1920s and continues this tradition. The band also incorporates other popular music styles, all arranged with the hallmark swing style of the Mustang Band. The SMU Mustang Band features a high-stepping, quick marching style and loud, brassy musical arrangements. The instrumentation of the band is all brass, saxophones, piccolo, and marching percussion.

== History ==
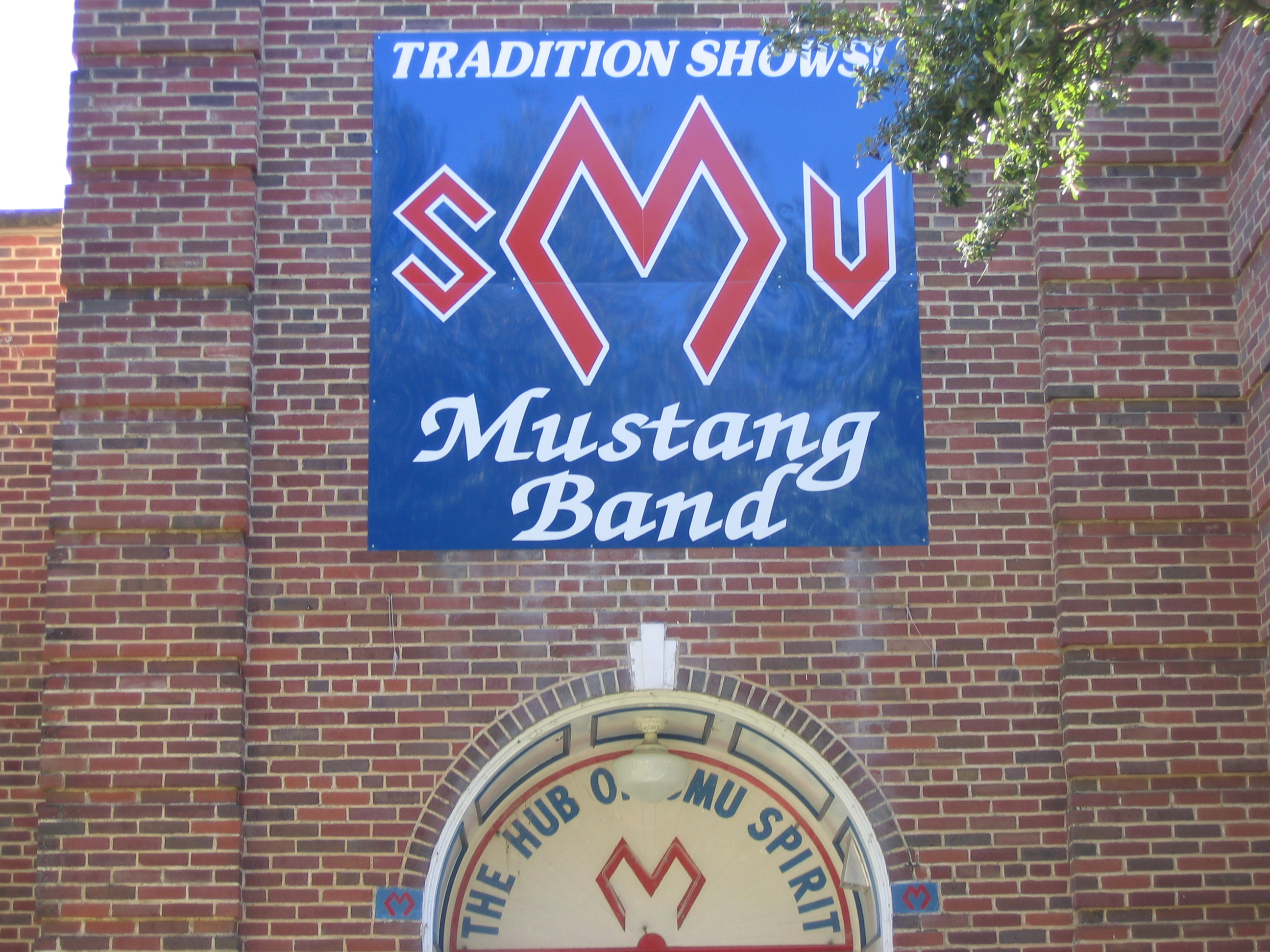
Entrance to the former SMU Mustang Band hall, located beneath Perkins Natatorium, now demolished

In the 1920s the SMU Mustang Band was the first college band to play jazz on the football field after V. Cyrus Barcus was hired as the director in 1924. It played the Vaudeville circuit and had its own weekly radio program in Dallas, Texas.

The SMU band became known as the Mustang Band in the 1950s. When Dr. Irving Dreibrodt became director in 1958, the band became independent from the SMU School of Music. Dr. Dreibrodt's 25-year tenure as director led to the creation of many of the band's traditions and songs that continue today.

- Hired to produce a band that people would watch at halftime, he jettisoned all non-brass wind instruments except 22 saxophones.
- He quickly introduced the concept of changing uniforms several times during a football game, and beginning in the fall of 1959 a writer for The Campus newspaper coined the name “The Best-Dressed Band in the Land.”
- In 1961 the band for the first time fielded 96 members along with its featured twirler, leading to another popular nickname of “96 Guys and a Doll.”

In 2001, the band performed at the first inauguration of George W. Bush. The band represented the United States in the 2022 D-Day Memorial Parade in Sainte-Mère-Église, in Normandy, France.

== Leadership ==
Charles Aguillon has been the director of the Mustang Band since 2022. Aguillon succeeded Don Hopkins as director. Hopkins, a former band member, directed the band from 2005 until his retirement.

Paul Crockett is the current Assistant Director for the Mustang Band, succeeding Tommy Tucker in 2024. Tucker was the Assistant Director of the SMU Mustang Band and is currently the primary music arranger. He obtained his degree from SMU in 1984 and previously served as the Mustang Band Assistant Director from 1984-1988. He has also been the musical producer/arranger for Pigskin Revue since 1981 and has been arranging music for various bands since 1971. He retired from his role as assistant director in 2024.

Jon Lee has been the drumline instructor and percussion arranger for the SMU Mustang Band since 1995. Lee is also a percussion instructor and director in the SMU Meadows School of the Arts.

== Traditions ==
=== Musical style ===
The SMU Mustang Band's music is based primarily in the Dixieland and Big Band eras of the 1920s, 1930s and 1940s. Most commonly referred to as ‘Mustang Jazz,’ it is the presentation of American jazz and popular music employing the following elements:

- Reinforced trumpet lead.
- Full blocked, well-reinforced, Big Band style arrangements. Instead of just writing three note chords (root, third, and fifth), nearly every chord is fattened-up with either the 6th or the 7th added, depending on how the chord is used.
- Scores utilize original/elaborate jazz rhythmic figures, which is more challenging than the simplified patterns that marching bands often use to ensure a clean sound on the football field.
- Percussionists seek to emulate a trap set.
- Solos and solis are used liberally.
- When performed outside, it will be easily heard by all.

=== Uniforms ===
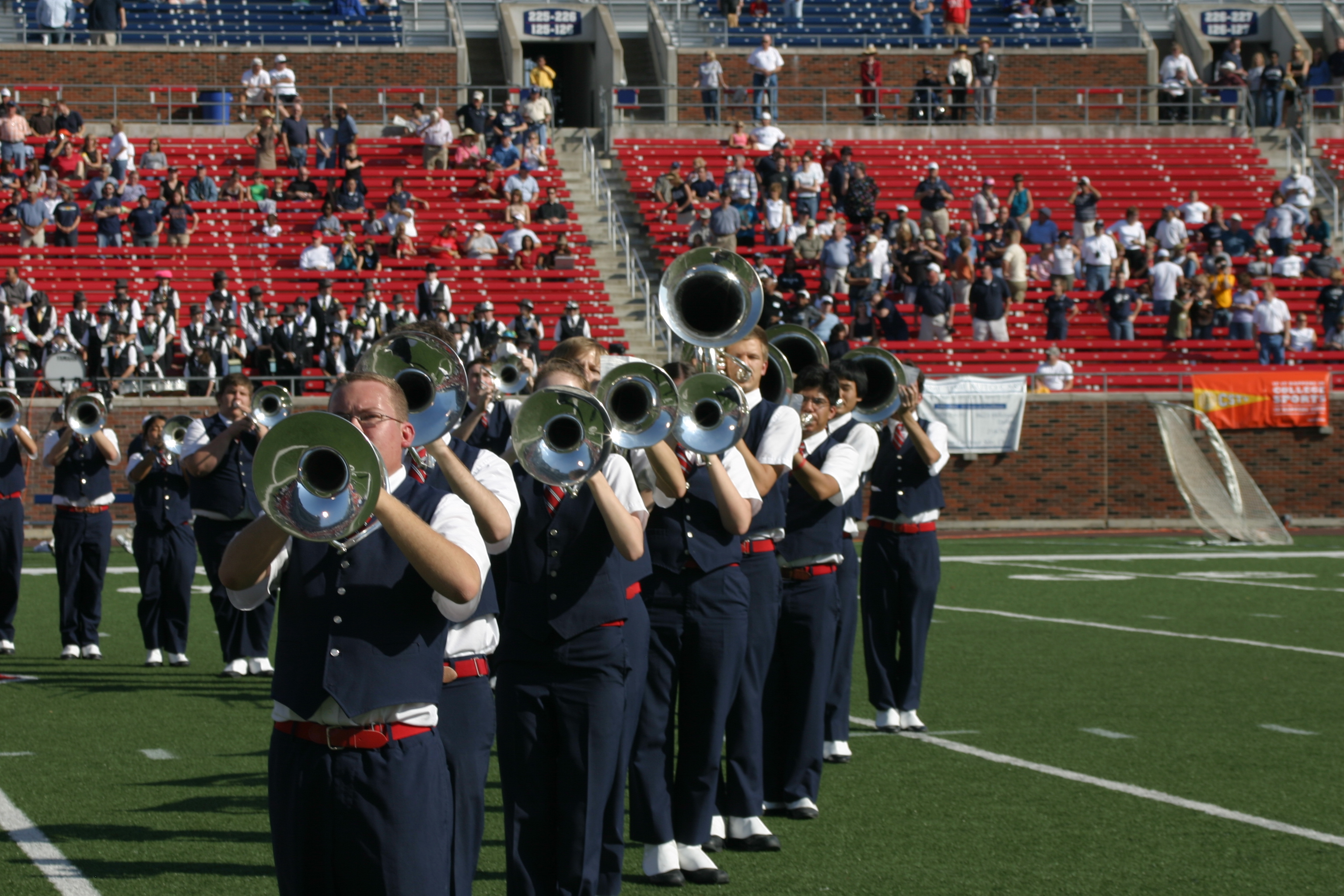
One of many uniform combinations, November 2005

The SMU Mustang Band earned its reputation as "The Best-Dressed Band in the Land" because of its multiple uniforms with a style that mimics a swing band more than a typical marching band. It has over 29 different uniforms made up of varying combinations of pants, shirts, coats, and ties. Band members wear one uniform for the pregame performance and change to another just before halftime at all SMU football games where the band plays. The uniform style reinforces the music style of a jazz band.

In the 1951 Cotton Bowl Classic between the University of Texas and the University of Tennessee, Irving Dreibrodt was directing the high school band portion of the halftime show. After seeing the Tennessee band change into tuxedos for halftime to perform the Tennessee Waltz, Dr. Dreibrodt decided that if he ever had a college band, he wanted to make it the best-dressed band in the land by using different uniforms. He explained why in a 2005 interview: "‘Cause in my opinion, if you please the eye, it’s a little easier to please the ear. So we went after pleasing the eye first."

The current uniform parts include the following:

- Red, blue, and candy stripe jackets
- Red, blue, and candy stripe vests
- Navy blue, white, and grey slacks
- Blue and red long tie and blue bowtie
- White button up shirts

Past uniform parts (no longer in use) include:

- Flannel nightgowns and caps (for late night public appearances)

=== Diamond M ===
The Diamond M is the signature formation of the SMU Mustang Band. The band had been forming a large block "M" until Dr. Dreibrodt arrived in 1958. He was impressed by the unique tradition of Ohio State's Script Ohio and wanted to create a trademark formation for the SMU band. With only 40 band members his first year, the band could not spell out "SMU" so he created a single-line "M" formation with the sides bent out in a double diamond shape to add some style. The Diamond M remains the trademark symbol of the SMU Mustang Band.

The marching band forms the Diamond M formation to the song Pony Battle Cry. The band typically comes off the field from this formation. The letter is sometimes flipped by inverting the two short lines in the center.

=== Post-game concert ===
The tradition of playing a concert from the stands at the end of a football game dates back to at least 1960 when the band went to Ohio State and played a forty-five-minute jazz concert after the game. The Mustang Band always concludes their concert with a rendition of In a Shanty in Old Shanty Town and the SMU Alma Mater, Varsity.

=== Beanies ===
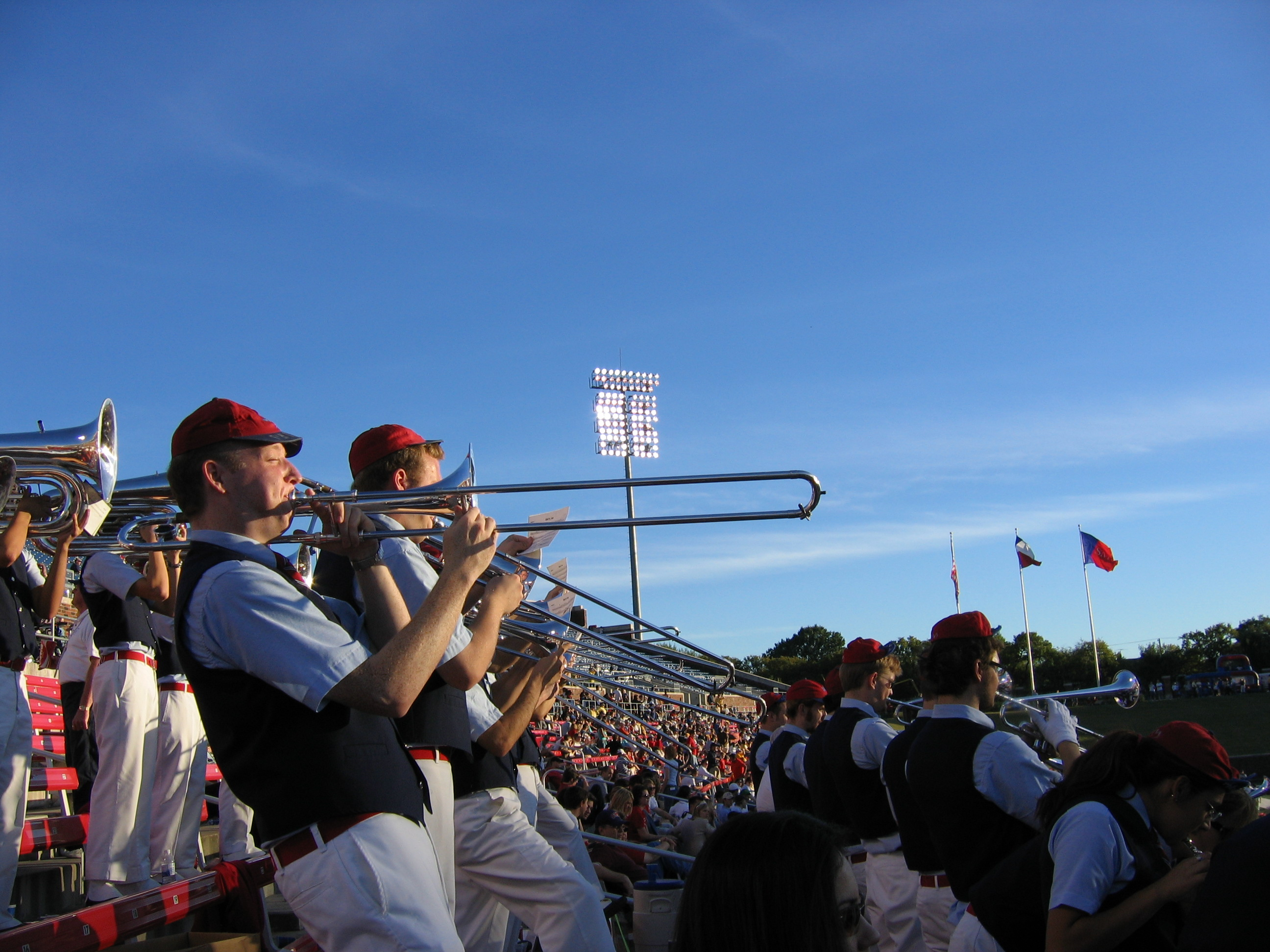
Mustang Band members with their beanies, 4th quarter of Homecoming 2004

The SMU Mustang Band carries many of the traditions of SMU, including the almost-forgotten first-year beanie. At one time, all entering first-year students at SMU wore green beanies. The university abandoned the beanie tradition sometime in the late 1950s, leaving football players and band members as the only people wearing them on campus.

Today "the privilege of the beanie" is afforded only to members of the Mustang Band. As a sign of their commitment to school spirit, the band members wear their beanies during rehearsals, the fourth quarter of SMU football games, and the last five minutes of every SMU basketball game.

=== Buzz 'em Up ===
In its early years, the all-male band would drift off to visit with the female students during the game. Cy Barcus, Mustang Band director from 1924–32, came up with the idea of having the remaining trumpets make a buzzing sound to alert the wayward band members to get back to their seats. That buzz—a flutter tongue on a concert F—was incorporated into the start of Peruna, the official SMU fight song.

=== Pigskin Revue ===
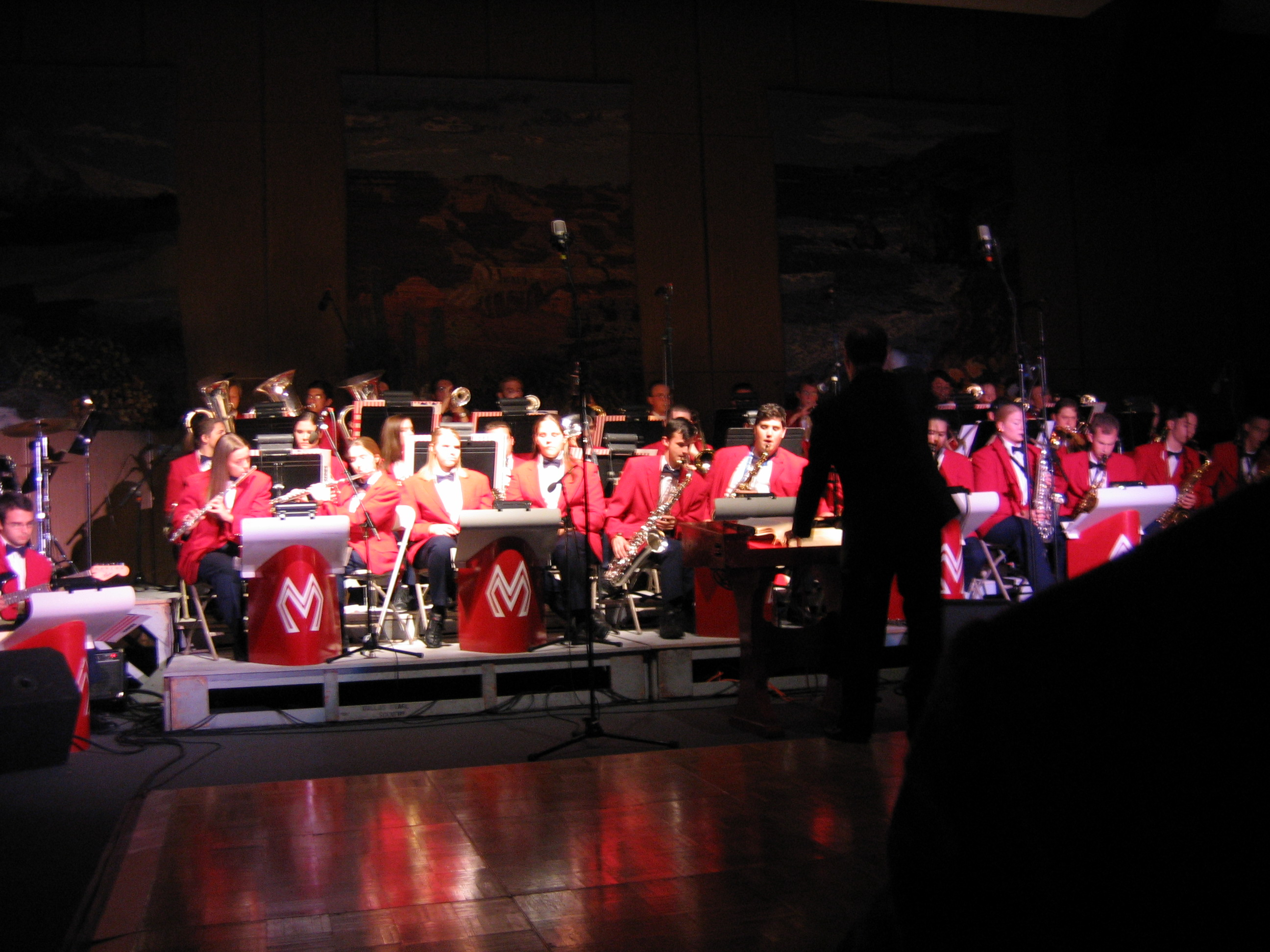
Pigskin Revue 2004

Pigskin Revue is a musical performance which features the SMU Mustang Band playing several songs along with singing, dancing, comedy, and other acts from band members and other organizations. Started in 1933, the Pigskin Revue was created as an old Vaudeville show where people showcased their talents. The Revue quickly grew to be an important part of SMU Homecoming celebrations. Past Pigskin Revues have also featured celebrity performers, including Bob Hope and Jerry Jeff Walker. The band celebrated its 90th Pigskin Revue in 2023.

== Traditional songs ==
SMU's fight song and pony mascot are named Peruna after a potent “medicine” marketed since the early 1890s that had a high alcohol content. The fight song is to the melody of “She’ll Be Coming ‘Round the Mountain” and the SMU Mustang Band has arranged multiple versions, including traditional, Dixieland, rock and roll, pop, and country-western Peruna.

At the end of every halftime performance the band forms its unique Diamond M formation to the tune of Pony Battle Cry, a school fight song introduced in 1964. The band ends the performance with the loud fanfare known as the Waring Ending and then quickly marches off-field to Peruna.

== Membership ==
Band members come from the business, engineering, fine arts, and liberal arts colleges within SMU, as well as several colleges in the Dallas area that do not have a marching band. They usually join during their first year at SMU, but many join their Sophomore, Junior, or even Senior years. Typically, band members have played an instrument in high school or were in band in high school, but not always. Anyone is welcome to audition for the band. Scholarships are awarded based on ability.

The SMU Mustang Band was an all-male ensemble for much of its first 60 years. Historically, the only women in the band were featured twirlers. When band director Frank Malone left in 1943 to form a US Army Air Corps band, he took 16 key band members with him. There weren't enough males left, so the band admitted women. By 1956 someone complained that women in the band were wearing trousers due to the uniform, and because SMU had a dress code prohibiting women from wearing slacks or trousers, the University decided to return the band to an all-male organization. Under pressure to provide equal opportunities for women, the Mustang Band readmitted women to the band permanently in 1977.

== Alumni organizations ==
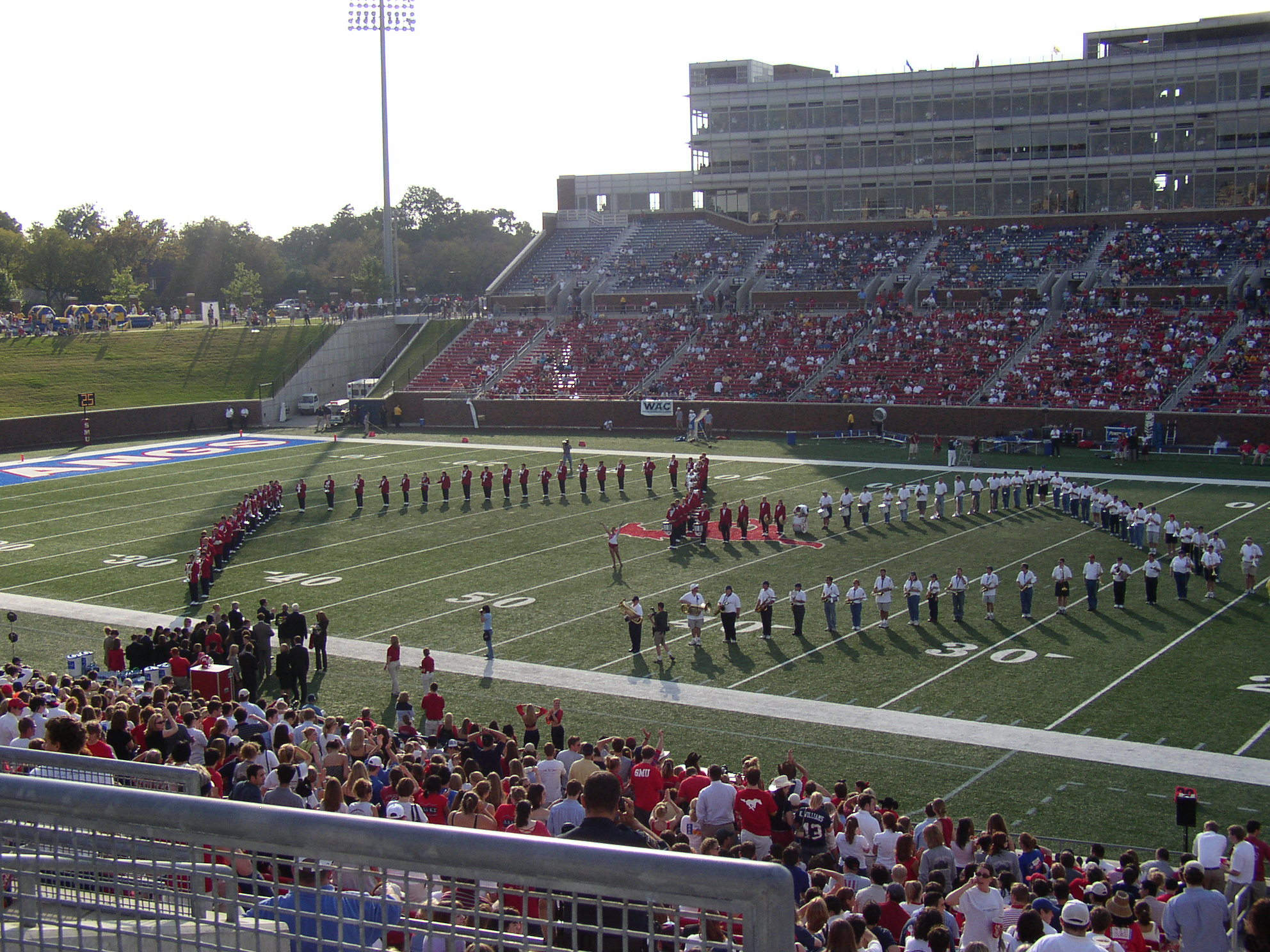
Alumni Band joins the Mustang Band in the trademark Diamond M at halftime during Homecoming, November 2003

The Alumni Band is an SMU Mustang Band support organization, assembled from former band members. Before SMU home football games, the band plays regular Mustang Band tunes up and down the Boulevard that runs through the center of campus where crowds gather for pre-game tailgate parties. It also marches on the field at Homecoming football games, plays at SMU basketball games during the winter break, and performs at public and private events when contributions are made to the Mustang Band.

The mission of the SMU Mustang Alumni Band is to actively and visibly support the SMU Mustang Band, preserve its musical history and traditions, and provide performance opportunities for all Mustang Band alumni.

The Mustang Band's official booster club, the Diamond M Club, is made up of SMU Mustang Band alumni, parents, and supporters. The Club primarily provides funding for student scholarships, but also provides financial support for Mustang Band uniforms, instrumentation, game day meals, performances, and travel costs as needed. The organization began in 1970 as the Mustang Band Alumni Association, but reorganized itself in 1985 under the current name. The Club is operated through the SMU Office of Development and managed by a board of directors elected by the membership.

== Rivalries ==
As part of the longstanding rivalry with TCU, called the Battle for the Iron Skillet, members of the Mustang Band dropped rye grass seed in the signature Diamond M formation onto the field at Amon G. Carter Stadium during the game on November 26, 1999. The incident was covered by the TCU newspaper, the Daily Skiff, in an article entitled "TCU students think SMU band's prank is funny".

== Discography ==
The Mustang Band has recorded several albums under the Mobile Fidelity Sound Lab label, then Fidelity Sound Records (FSR), in the 1960s and -70s.

Mustang Band Albums
Year	Album name	Label
1962	Mustang Jazz	FSR
1966	Mustang Jazz, Vol. II	FSR
1969	Mustang Jazz at the Cotton Bowl	FSR
1974	Strictly Seventy-Four	Precision Custom Recording
1979	Southwest Conference Jazz	FSR
1979	Mustang Mania Jazz	FSR
1986	On the Road	Self-Produced
1990	Red Hot 'n' Blues	Self-Produced
2002	College Fight Songs - Southern Methodist University Mustangs	Self-Produced
