= Jeff Hafley =

American football player and coach (born 1979)

Miami Dolphins
- Title: Head coach

Personal information
- Born: April 4, 1979 (age 47); Montvale, New Jersey, U.S.
- Listed height: 5 ft 10 in (1.78 m)
- Listed weight: 185 lb (84 kg)

Career information
- Position: Wide receiver
- High school: Pascack Hills (Montvale)
- College: Siena (1997–2000)
- NFL draft: 2001: undrafted

Career history
- WPI (2001) Running backs coach; Albany (2002–2005); Graduate assistant (2002–2003); Defensive backs coach (2004–2005); Pittsburgh (2006–2010); Graduate assistant (2006–2007); Defensive backs coach (2008–2010); Rutgers (2011) Defensive backs coach; Tampa Bay Buccaneers (2012–2013); Assistant defensive backs coach (2012); Defensive backs coach (2013); Cleveland Browns (2014–2015) Defensive backs coach; San Francisco 49ers (2016–2018) Defensive backs coach; Ohio State (2019) Co-defensive coordinator & defensive backs coach; Boston College (2020–2023) Head coach; Green Bay Packers (2024–2025) Defensive coordinator; Miami Dolphins (2026–present) Head coach

Head coaching record
- Regular season: 1–8 (.111)
- Career: NFL: 1–8 (.111); NCAA: 22–26 (.458)
- Coaching profile at Pro Football Reference

Jeffrey Michael Hafley (born April 4, 1979) is an American professional football coach and former wide receiver who is the head coach for the Miami Dolphins of the National Football League (NFL). He previously served as the head coach at Boston College from 2020 to 2023. He played college football at Siena University from 1997 to 2000.

Hafley was born in Montvale, New Jersey. He prepped at Pascack Hills High School in Montvale. After graduation from high school in 1997, Hafley enrolled at Siena University and played wide receiver for the Saints, lettering for four seasons.

From 2001 to 2011, Hafley began his coaching career as an assistant with WPI (2001), Albany (2002–2005), Pittsburgh (2006–2010) and Rutgers (2011) in a variety of roles, finding himself now on the defensive side of the ball. He began his NFL coaching career in 2012 as an assistant defensive backs coach with the Tampa Bay Buccaneers before being promoted to defensive backs coach the following season. He took the same role with the Cleveland Browns (2014–2015) and the San Francisco 49ers (2016–2018) before taking on his first defensive coordinator role with Ohio State in 2019.

On December 13, 2019, Hafley was announced as the head football coach for Boston College. He led the Eagles to two bowl games across four seasons, only participating in one due to the COVID-19 pandemic. Hafley was 22–26 over his career with the Eagles. Coming off his team's first winning season, he elected to take a position as the defensive coordinator for the Green Bay Packers, where he served until 2025.

On January 19, 2026, Hafley was named the 12th head coach of the Miami Dolphins.

== Early life and playing career ==
Born in Montvale, New Jersey, on April 4, 1979, Hafley the son of Ellise (née Goulazian) and Greg Hafley. Jeff played prep football and baseball at Pascack Hills High School. He played JV football before moving up to varsity. He spent time at quarterback, wide receiver and safety for a Pascack Hills team that went from 0–9 his junior year to 7–2 his senior season. He was named First Team All-North Bergen Interscholastic Athletic League as a senior in 1996.

In February 1997, Hafley committed to play football for Ed Zaloom's Siena Saints football team. As a member of the Saints football team, Hafley was exclusively a wide receiver, but a rash of injuries hampered him from really getting extended playing time. He would spend his time in the coaches' office and watch film, and then go to the games and sit up in the booth, and help them coach.

He graduated from Siena College in 2001 with a bachelor's degree in history. He earned a master's degree from the University at Albany, SUNY in 2003.

== Coaching career ==
=== Early coaching career ===
Hafley began his coaching career under head coach Ed Zaloom, whom he had played for at Siena, at Worcester Polytechnic Institute in 2001. Serving as the running backs coach, the Engineers finished the season 5–5.. The following season he joined Bob Ford's staff at University of Albany on a recommendation from Zaloom. After spending two seasons as a graduate assistant, achieving his Master's Degree, he was promoted to defensive backs coach in the winter of 2003. In 2004, Hafley helped mentor Kurt Campbell, who played the rover position, to help him get drafted by the Green Bay Packers in the 2005 NFL Draft. Campbell was the first ever NFL draft pick in school history.

In the winter of 2005-06, Hafley was debating taking a position as a graduate assistant with the Pittsburgh Panthers, moving up to the NCAA Division I FBS level. When he was doubting himself, a conversation with his former head coach Jay Bateman, pushed him to take the job when Bateman told him to "bet on yourself." Hafley took the job with Pittsburgh, joining Dave Wannstedt's staff and sleeping in the team's facility for two years on an air mattress. He didn't have a place to live, but his drive stood out to Wannstedt, who promoted him to a full-time assistant in January 2008.

Following Wannstedt's resignation at Pittsburgh, he recommended Hafley to Greg Schiano at Rutgers, who hired him as the secondary coach in 2011. While at Rutgers, the Scarlet Knights were the ninth-ranked passing defense in the country; Duron Harmon earned first-team All-Big East honors, and Logan Ryan received second-team accolades. Both Harmon and Ryan were drafted by and played for the New England Patriots.

=== NFL assistant coach ===
In 2012, Hafley made his NFL coaching debut with the Tampa Bay Buccaneers. He joined the Bucs as assistant defensive backs coach and spent 2013 as the secondary coach/safeties. That season, Hafley oversaw a unit which helped the team finish tied for third in the NFL with 21 interceptions. On January 27, 2014, Hafley was hired by the Cleveland Browns to coach their secondary. Hafley would remain in this role for 2 seasons (2014–15), before being relieved of his duties due to a coaching overhaul. On January 24, 2016, Hafley was hired by San Francisco 49ers' new head coach Chip Kelly to coach the defensive backs.

=== Ohio State ===
In 2019, Hafley was hired to be the co-defensive coordinator at Ohio State. Hafley quickly established himself as one of the best recruiters in the country, being ranked ninth overall recruiter for the 2020 class by 247Sports.com.

=== Boston College ===
On December 13, 2019, Hafley was hired to be the head coach at Boston College after the firing of Steve Addazio.

==== 2020 season ====
In his first season, due to the COVID-19 pandemic in the United States, Boston College's schedule was to be played in full, but there would be no one in attendance at games played in Massachusetts. Due to a Boston College school rule, everyone who was a student and faculty was to receive a vaccination. With one player on the Eagles refusing to get the shot, Hafley and the school, helped find that student athlete a new home to transfer to. In the season opener, Boston College opened at Durham, North Carolina and defeated Duke 26–6. In his first home game, Boston College defeated Texas State 24–21. The following week Hafley and the Eagles were narrowly defeated by #12 North Carolina, 26–22. The next week, the Eagles were defeated Pittsburgh 31–30 in overtime. The Eagles then travelled to Blacksburg, Virginia where they were defeated by #23 Virginia Tech. The next week, Boston College defeated Georgia Tech 48–27. Boston College then traveled to Clemson, South Carolina where they were narrowly defeated by #1 Clemson 34–28, being shut out in the first second half by the Tigers defense. In the 2020 version of the Holy War, Boston College was scorched by #2 Notre Dame, 45–31. The Eagles wrapped up the final home game with a 34–27 victory over Louisville. The following week, Boston College finished the regular season with a 43–32 defeat in Charlottesville, Virginia to Virginia. Despite being Bowl eligible, the Eagles opted out of playing in any Bowl due to the toll the season took on them throughout the Covid-19 Pandemic.

==== 2021 season ====
In the home opener, Boston College shutout Colgate 51–0 in their first ever meeting. In the first road game, the Eagles defeated UMass 45–28 in The Battle of the Bay State rivalry. The following week, Boston College traveled to Philadelphia to take on Temple Owls, where the Eagles defeated the Owls, 28–3. The next week at homecoming, Boston College defeated the Missouri Tigers, 41–34. In the conference opener, the Eagles lost a close game, 19–13 to #25 Clemson. Following the bye week, Boston College then took on #21 NC State, losing 33–7. Boston College then traveled to Louisville, Kentucky to play Louisville. The Eagles fell 28–14. Boston College then traveled to Syracuse, where they were defeated by Syracuse 21–6. The next week, Boston College bounced back defeating Virginia Tech 17–3. Boston College wrapped up its road games against Georgia Tech winning 41–30. The win secured Hafley his 2nd season with a bowl game. Boston College then returned home, losing to Florida State 26–23. On Senior day, Boston College lost in a blowout, 41–10 to #18 Wake Forest. The Eagles finished the regular season 6–6. Boston College received a bid to play against East Carolina in the Military Bowl, however once again the Eagles didn't play a bowl game due to Covid-19. Mid-way through the season, Hafley received a contract extension through the 2026 season.

==== 2022 season ====
In the home opener, Boston College was defeated by Rutgers, 22–21, where Halfey was matched up against his former boss, Greg Schiano. The following week, Boston College lost 27–10 to Virginia Tech. Following the rivalry loss, Boston College returned home to take on the Maine Black Bears, where they won 38–17. The next week Boston College took a 44–14, in Tallahassee to Florida State. The next week, Boston College returned home and took on Louisville, where they won 34–33. The Eagles remained home for homecoming week against #5 Clemson, where they defeated 31–3. Boston College then traveled to #13 Wake Forest, where they were dominated 43–15. Boston College then traveled to UConn, where they lost 13–3. Following the loss to the Huskies, Boston College returned home to play Duke, and lost 38–31. Boston College bounced back the next week at #16 NC State, defeating the Wolfpack 21–20. Boston College then traveled to Notre Dame, Indiana the next weekend, where they were shutout by Notre Dame 44–0. The Eagles returned home the following week, where they were defeated by the Orange, 32–23 on senior night. The loss left Hafley's Eagles missing a bowl game for the first time in his tenure as head coach.

==== 2023 season ====
In the season opener, Boston College was defeated 27–24, by Northern Illinois. The following week, the Eagles hosted then-ranked # 5 (FCS) Holy Cross in a rivalry match, winning 31–28. Boston College opened up conference play with a 31–29 loss to #3 Florida State. The next week Boston College travelled to Louisville, KY to play Louisville. The Eagles were blown out 56–28. The next week they defeated Virginia, 27–24. Boston College traveled to West Point, NY winning a close game over Army 27–24. The next week Boston College defeated Georgia Tech 38–23. On homecoming, Boston College won a close game over UConn 21–14. The win gave Hafley his 20th on-field win at Boston College. In next game, quarterback Tommy Castellanos had a 7-yard touchdown rush with 2:23 left to defeat Syracuse 17–10. The win gave Hafley his third 6-win season, making them bowl eligible for the 3rd time in 4 seasons. In the rivalry with Virginia Tech, the Eagles were blown out, 48–22. Following week, Boston College got beat on their final road game of the season to Pittsburgh 24–16. On Senior Day, Boston College was routed by Miami (FL) 45–20. The Eagles accepted an invitation to the Fenway Bowl, where they defeated #17 SMU, 23–14. The win made Hafley the first Boston College coach since Jeff Jagodzinski in 2007 to win his first Bowl game as head coach at Boston College.

During his four years with the team, Hafley led the Eagles to a 22–26 overall record and had three bowl game invitations, but BC only played in one of those three games.

=== Green Bay Packers ===
On January 31, 2024, Hafley was hired by the Green Bay Packers to be their defensive coordinator, marking his return to the NFL after five seasons in the college coaching ranks. A source cited the ever changing college football landscape, mostly pertaining to the transfer portal and NIL money complications without clear guidelines, as the reason for Hafley's move back to the NFL. At the conclusion of the 2024 NFL season, the Packers were ranked 5th in yards allowed. Under his tutelage, the Packers had two defensive players named to the Pro Bowl, Rashan Gary and Xavier McKinney, with McKinney being named First Team All-Pro and two rookie additions of Edgerrin Cooper and Evan Williams.

Despite the offseason acquisition of All-Pro defensive end Micah Parsons, the team regressed in Hafley's second year as coordinator, having the 12th ranked defense in yards allowed (though the team was ranked sixth in total yards before Parsons suffered a season-ending injury in week 15). Parsons was named First Team All-Pro, and McKinney to the Second Team.

=== Miami Dolphins ===
On January 19, 2026, Hafley was named the 12th head coach of the Miami Dolphins.

== Head coaching record ==
=== College ===
Year	Team	Overall	Conference	Standing	Bowl/playoffs
Boston College Eagles (Atlantic Coast Conference) (2020–2023)
2020	Boston College	6–5	5–5	T–6th	(Note: Despite being bowl eligible, Boston College was the first of many NCAA programs to withdraw from postseason participation due to concerns over the COVID-19 pandemic.)
2021	Boston College	6–6	2–6	T–6th (Atlantic)	Military (Note: The Military Bowl was cancelled the day before it was scheduled due to positive COVID-19 cases in the Boston College program.)
2022	Boston College	3–9	2–6	7th (Atlantic)	
2023	Boston College	7–6	3–5	T–9th	W Fenway
Boston College:		22–26	12–22		
Total:		22–26			

=== NFL ===
Team	Year	Regular season					Postseason			
Team	Year	Won	Lost	Ties	Win %	Finish	Won	Lost	Win %	Result
MIA	2026	1	7	0	.125	TBD in AFC East				
Total		1	7	0	.125					

== Personal life ==
Hafley and his wife, Gina, have two daughters.
