= Tommy Castellanos =

American football player (born 2003)

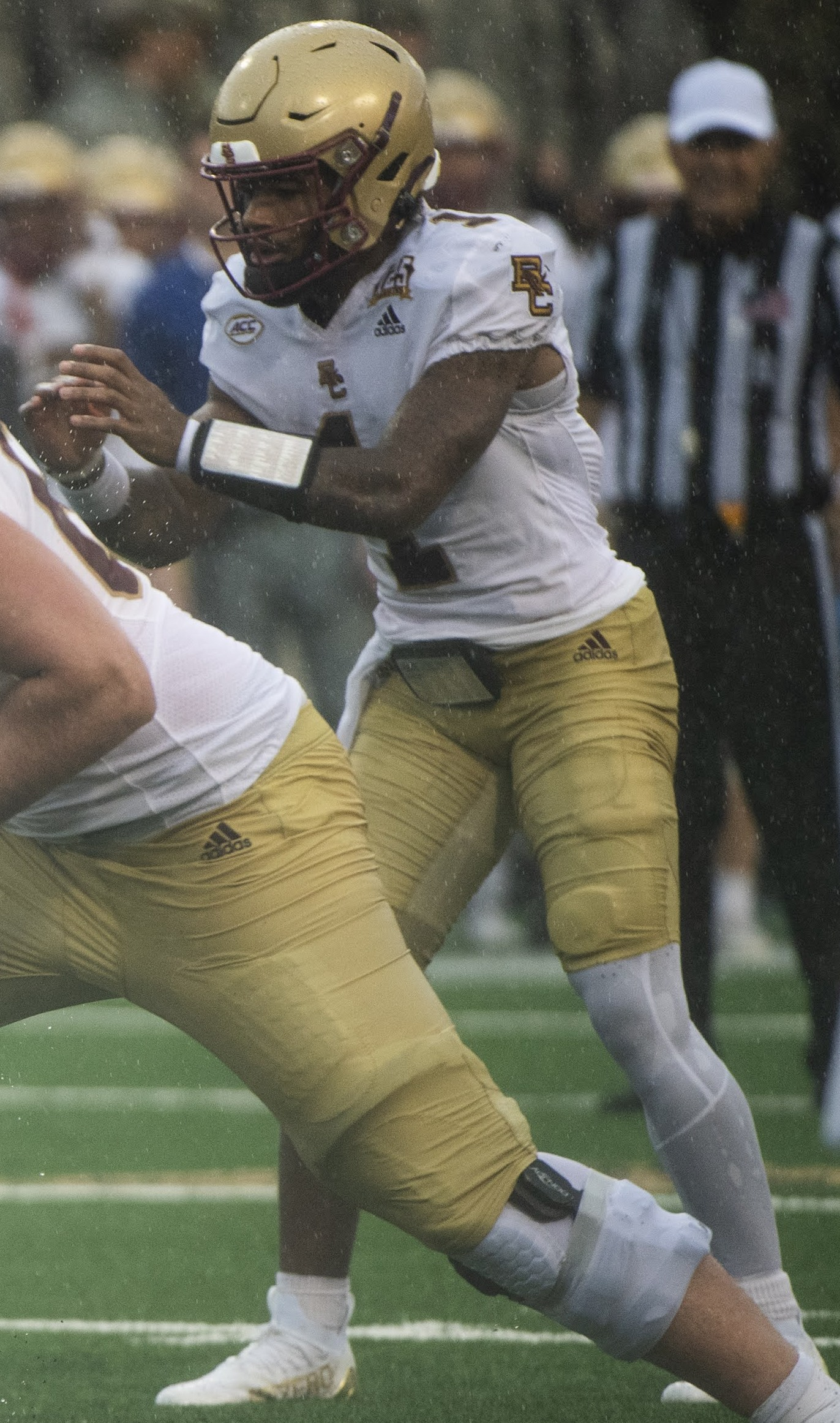
- Castellanos with Boston College in 2023

No. 4 – Texas Tech Red Raiders
- Position: Quarterback
- Class: Redshirt Senior

Personal information
- Born: August 26, 2003 (age 23); Miami, Florida, U.S.
- Listed height: 5 ft 10 in (1.78 m)
- Listed weight: 198 lb (90 kg)

Career information
- High school: Ware County (GA)
- College: UCF (2022); Boston College (2023–2024); Florida State (2025); Texas Tech (2026–present)
- NFL draft: 2026: undrafted
- Stats at ESPN

Thomas Castellanos (born August 26, 2003) is an American college football quarterback for the Texas Tech Red Raiders. He previously played for the UCF Knights, Boston College Eagles, and Florida State Seminoles.

== Early life ==
Castellanos was born in Miami, Florida, and grew up in Waycross, Georgia. He was the seventh of 11 children in his family. His father died when he was 3, and Castellanos was raised by his mother, Yukia.

Castellanos attended Ware County High School where he played football, basketball and track and field. As a junior, he was named first-team all-state at quarterback while leading his team to a 10–2 record and throwing for 2,881 yards and 23 touchdowns, additionally rushing for 939 yards and 24 touchdowns. As a senior, he threw for 2,613 yards and 25 scores while adding 968 rushing yards and 13 touchdowns. Castellanos totaled 7,710 passing yards and 3,681 rushing yards for Ware County, also playing defensive back in addition to quarterback. As a three-star prospect and the #33 ATH in the country, Castellanos committed to play college football for the UCF Knights, choosing them over Florida State and Georgia.

== College career ==
=== UCF ===
==== 2022 season ====
As a true freshman with the UCF Knights in 2022, Castellanos appeared in five games and completed 9-of-16 pass attempts for 75 yards. He entered the NCAA transfer portal after the season and ultimately transferred to Boston College, choosing them over Texas State.

=== Boston College ===
==== 2023 season ====
Castellanos was named backup to Emmett Morehead to begin the 2023 season, but replaced him in the first half of the season opener against Northern Illinois. Entering the game with his team down 14–0, he helped them come back before losing in overtime, leading them in passing and rushing while also being responsible for all three of their touchdowns. He was named the team's full-time starting quarterback afterwards. In his first start, he led Boston College to a 31–28 win over Holy Cross while completing 17-of-23 pass attempts for 204 yards and two touchdowns, additionally having 69 rushing yards off 16 attempts. In his second start, he helped the Eagles come close to upsetting third-ranked Florida State, throwing for 305 yards and a touchdown and running for 95 yards and another score in the 31–29 loss.

Castellanos continued as BC's starting quarterback for the remainder of the 2023 season. He led the Eagles to their first seven-win season since 2018 and their first bowl game win since 2016, in which the Eagles upset No. 24 SMU Mustangs, and he won Offensive MVP.

Castellanos ended the season as the second-most prolific rushing quarterback in the FBS, only behind LSU's Jayden Daniels.

==== 2024 season ====
Castellanos was named the starter for the 2024 season. To begin the season, the Eagles, led by Castellanos, upset the No. 10 Florida State Seminoles, where Castellanos was 10 of 16 for 106 pass yards, two pass touchdowns and no interceptions, adding 73 rush yards and a rush touchdown. The following week, after a blowout win against Duquesne, the Eagles were ranked No. 24 in the AP Poll, which was the first time they had been ranked since 2018. That week, the Eagles came close to upsetting the No. 6 Missouri Tigers, eventually losing 27–21. In this game, Castellanos was 16 of 28 for 249 passing yards, three pass touchdowns, and two interceptions. The following week, the Eagles beat the Michigan State Spartans 23–19 in the famous red bandana game, where Castellanos was 10 of 16 for 140 pass yards, a pass touchdown and no interceptions. It was later reported Castellanos had an undisclosed injury, which ruled him out for the 21–20 win over Western Kentucky. In the Week 11 game against Syracuse, Castellanos was 2 of 7 for 14 pass yards, one pass touchdown and an interception, before eventually getting injured with an apparent lower body injury, sidelining him for the rest of the game in the 37–31 win over Syracuse. It was later stated that Castellanos was healthy enough to return, but benched for the remainder of the game by head coach Bill O’Brien.

On November 13, 2024, head coach Bill O'Brien announced FIU transfer Grayson James would get the start over Castellanos at SMU. The next day, Castellanos announced he intended to enter the transfer portal. On December 9, 2024, Castellanos officially entered the transfer portal.

=== Florida State ===
On December 11, 2024, Castellanos announced that he would transfer to Florida State. In his first start with Florida State, which was unranked at the time, Castellanos threw 9 of 14 for 152 yards, and had 16 carries, 78 yards and a rushing touchdown to add to an upset win against the eighth-ranked team, Alabama, 31–17.

=== Texas Tech ===
On August 26, 2026, Castellanos committed to play for the Texas Tech Red Raiders for his fifth season. After filing a lawsuit in the state of Kentucky, he was granted a temporary restraining order against the NCAA and granted eligibility for 2026. On October 2, the Kentucky Court of Appeals ruled in favor of the NCAA, dissolving the temporary injunction that had granted Castellanos an extra year of eligibility. That same day, Texas Tech announced that Castellanos would not be eligible for the Red Raiders' week 5 game against Colorado. On October 16, Castellanos was granted a temporary injunction from Judge Brian Edwards of the Jefferson County Circuit Court, clearing Castellanos to play for the Red Raiders again. On October 30, Texas Tech head coach Joey McGuire named Castellanos the starting quarterback for the Red Raiders' next game against Arizona. Castellanos led the Red Raiders to a 34–26 victory over the Wildcats, finishing with 117 rushing yards and a touchdown, becoming the seventh Texas Tech quarterback to finish a game with at least 100 rushing yards. Castellanos would start the following week, against West Virginia, leading Texas Tech to a 53–48 victory, throwing for a career-high 362 yards with five touchdowns and rushing for another 127 yards; for his performance, Castellanos was named both the Big 12 Offensive Player of the Week and the Earl Campbell Tyler Rose Award Player of the Week.

=== Statistics ===
Season	Team	Games			Passing								Rushing			
Season	Team	GP	GS	Record	Cmp	Att	Pct	Yds	Y/A	TD	Int	Rtg	Att	Yds	Avg	TD
2022	UCF	5	0	—	9	16	56.3	75	4.7	0	0	95.6	14	120	8.6	1
2023	Boston College	13	12	7–5	189	330	57.3	2,248	6.8	15	14	121.0	215	1,114	5.2	13
2024	Boston College	8	8	4–4	99	161	61.5	1,366	8.5	18	5	163.4	93	194	2.1	1
2025	Florida State	12	12	5–7	180	309	58.3	2,760	8.9	15	9	143.5	137	557	4.1	9
2026	Texas Tech	9	5	5–0	54	95	56.8	985	10.4	14	3	186.3	86	414	4.8	3
Career		47	37	21–16	531	911	58.3	7,434	8.2	62	31	142.5	545	2,398	4.4	27

== Professional career ==
Pre-draft measurables
Height	Weight	Arm length	Hand span	Wingspan	40-yard dash	10-yard split	20-yard split	20-yard shuttle	Three-cone drill	Vertical jump	Broad jump
5 ft 9 3/4 in (1.77 m)	198 lb (90 kg)	30 3/8 in (0.77 m)	8 7/8 in (0.23 m)	6 ft 0 3/4 in (1.85 m)	4.62 s	1.60 s	2.60 s	4.52 s	7.16 s	31.0 in (0.79 m)	9 ft 8 in (2.95 m)
All values from Pro Day

In April 2026, Castellanos attended the rookie minicamp of the Tennessee Titans. On July 31, 2026, Castellanos was granted a fifth year of college eligibility as part of a class-wide preliminary injunction against the NCAA, allowing him to pursue a return to college football. The ruling followed his limited participation at UCF, where he played in only five games during the 2022 season, including the American Athletic Conference Championship Game.
