= 2023 Louisville Cardinals football team =

American college football season

2023 Louisville Cardinals football

ACC Championship, L 6–16 vs. Florida State

Holiday Bowl, L 28–42 vs. USC
- Conference: Atlantic Coast Conference

Ranking
- Coaches: No. 18
- AP: No. 19
- Record: 10–4 (7–1 ACC)
- Head coach: Jeff Brohm (1st season)
- Offensive coordinator: Brian Brohm (1st season)
- Offensive scheme: Spread
- Co-defensive coordinators: Ron English (2nd season); Mark Hagen (1st season)
- Base defense: 4–2–5 or 4–3
- Home stadium: L&N Stadium

Uniform
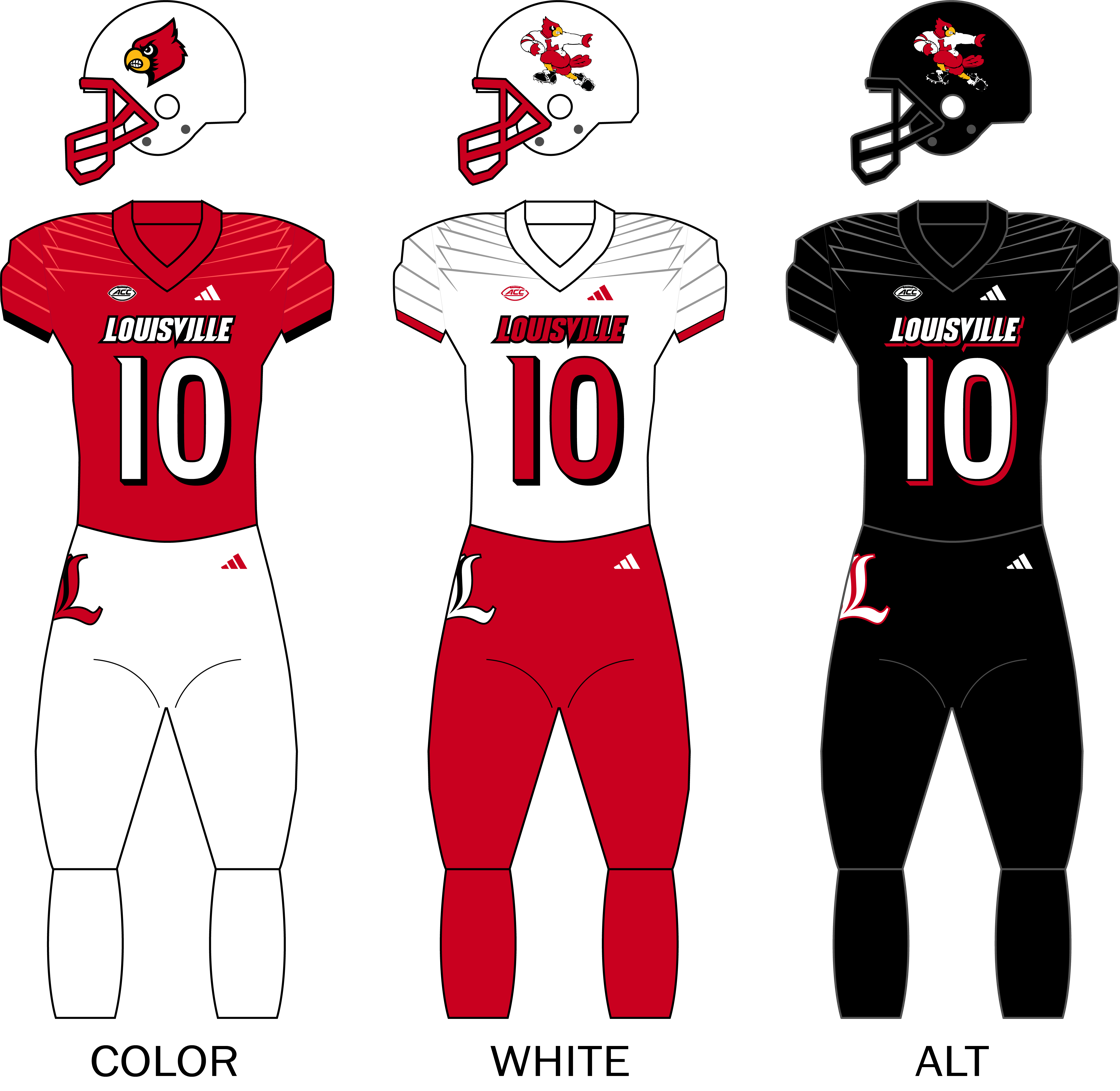

2023 Atlantic Coast Conference football standings
	Conf.			Overall
Team	W		L	W		L
No. 6 Florida State y$	8	–	0	13	–	1
No. 19 Louisville y	7	–	1	10	–	4
No. 21 NC State	6	–	2	9	–	4
Georgia Tech	5	–	3	7	–	6
Virginia Tech	5	–	3	7	–	6
No. 20 Clemson	4	–	4	9	–	4
Duke	4	–	4	8	–	5
North Carolina	4	–	4	8	–	5
Boston College	3	–	5	7	–	6
Miami (FL)	3	–	5	7	–	6
Syracuse	2	–	6	6	–	7
Pittsburgh	2	–	6	3	–	9
Virginia	2	–	6	3	–	9
Wake Forest	1	–	7	4	–	8
Championship: Florida State 16, Louisville 6
$ – Conference champion; y – Championship game participant; Rankings from AP Poll

The 2023 Louisville Cardinals football team represented University of Louisville as a member of the Atlantic Coast Conference (ACC) during the 2023 NCAA Division I FBS football season. The Cardinals were led by first-year head coach Jeff Brohm and played home games at the L&N Stadium in Louisville, Kentucky. The Louisville Cardinals football team drew an average home attendance of 51,252 in 2023.

This was the first season of the ACC without divisions. In this system, the two teams with the highest conference winning percentage are chosen to play in the ACC Championship Game.

The Cardinals began the season 6–0. This streak was capped off by a win at home in front of a record crowd over top 10 Notre Dame.

With a win over Miami on the road, Louisville clinched a spot in the 2024 ACC Championship Game. In its first appearance in program history, Louisville lost to Florida State 16–6.

The Cards ended the season in the 2023 Holiday Bowl against the USC Trojans, where they lost 28–42. Louisville finished the season with three straight loses to end the season with a 10–4 record.

== Offseason ==
=== Players leaving for NFL ===
Louisville had three players chosen in the 2023 NFL draft. Three other players were signed as undrafted free agents.

==== NFL draftees ====
Round	Pick	Player	Position	NFL club
3	82	YaYa Diaby	DE	Tampa Bay Buccaneers
5	136	Yasir Abdullah	LB	Jacksonville Jaguars
6	180	Kei'Trel Clark	CB	Arizona Cardinals

==== Undrafted free agents ====
Player	Position	NFL club	Reference
Malik Cunningham	QB	New England Patriots	
Trevor Reid	OT	Philadelphia Eagles	
Tiyon Evans	RB	Los Angeles Rams	
Eric Miller	RB	Los Angeles Rams	

== Schedule ==
Louisville and the ACC announced the 2023 football schedule on January 30, 2023. The 2023 season will be the conference's first season since 2004 without division scheduling. The new format sets Louisville with three set conference opponents, while playing the remaining ten teams twice (home and away) in a four–year cycle. The Cardinals three set conference opponents for the next four years are Georgia Tech, Miami (FL), and Virginia.

Date	Time	Opponent	Rank	Site	TV	Result	Attendance
September 1	7:30 p.m.	vs. Georgia Tech		Mercedes-Benz Stadium; Atlanta, GA (Aflac Kickoff)	ESPN	W 39–34	36,101
September 7	7:30 p.m.	Murray State*		L&N Stadium; Louisville, KY	ACCN	W 56–0	45,273
September 16	12:00 p.m.	vs. Indiana*		Lucas Oil Stadium; Indianapolis, IN	BTN	W 21–14	37,250
September 23	3:30 p.m.	Boston College		L&N Stadium; Louisville, KY	ACCN	W 56–28	48,294
September 29	7:00 p.m.	at NC State		Carter–Finley Stadium; Raleigh, NC	ESPN	W 13–10	56,919
October 7	7:30 p.m.	No. 10 Notre Dame*	No. 25	L&N Stadium; Louisville, KY	ABC	W 33–20	59,081
October 14	6:30 p.m.	at Pittsburgh	No. 14	Acrisure Stadium; Pittsburgh, PA	The CW	L 21–38	46,296
October 28	3:30 p.m.	No. 20 Duke^{†}	No. 18	L&N Stadium; Louisville, KY	ESPN	W 23–0	52,319
November 4	3:30 p.m.	Virginia Tech	No. 13	L&N Stadium; Louisville, KY	ACCN	W 34–3	49,945
November 9	7:30 p.m.	Virginia	No. 11	L&N Stadium; Louisville, KY	ESPN	W 31–24	44,628
November 18	12:00 p.m.	at Miami (FL)	No. 10	Hard Rock Stadium; Miami Gardens, FL (rivalry)	ABC	W 38–31	44,996
November 25	12:00 p.m.	Kentucky*	No. 10	L&N Stadium; Louisville, KY (rivalry)	ABC	L 31–38	59,225
December 2	8:00 p.m.	vs. No. 4 Florida State	No. 14	Bank of America Stadium; Charlotte, NC (ACC Championship Game)	ABC	L 6–16	62,314
December 27	8:00 p.m.	vs. USC*	No. 15	Petco Park; San Diego, CA (Holiday Bowl)	FOX	L 28–42	35,317
*Non-conference game; ^{†}Homecoming; Rankings from AP Poll (and CFP Rankings, after October 31) – Released prior to game; All times are in Eastern time

== Roster ==
2023 Louisville Cardinals football team roster
Players
Coaches
Offense

Pos.	#	Name	Class
WR	0	Chris Bell	So
WR	1	Jamari Thrash	Jr
WR	2	Jadon Thompson	Jr
WR	3	Kevin Coleman Jr.	So
RB	4	Maurice Turner	So
QB	6	Evan Conley	Sr
WR	7	Jimmy Calloway	So
WR	9	Ahmari Huggins-Bruce	Jr
QB	10	Pierce Clarkson	Fr
TE	11	Jamari Johnson	Fr
QB	12	Brady Allen	Fr
QB	13	Jack Plummer	Sr
QB	14	Sam Vaulton	So
QB	15	Harrison Bailey	Jr
QB	17	Travis Egan	Fr
QB	18	Sam Young	So
QB	19	Brock Domann	Sr
RB	22	Keyjuan Brown	Fr
RB	23	Isaac Guerendo	Sr
RB	25	Jawhar Jordan	Jr
RB	26	Thane Martin	Fr
RB	30	Kaden Moorman	Fr
RB	33	Mario Agyen	Jr
WR	36	Jatavian Churchill	Jr
TE	42	Josh Lifson	GS
TE	45	Duane Martin	Jr
WR	47	Jaedon King	Fr
WR	49	Kris Hughes	Fr
OL	51	Austin Collins	So
OL	53	Lance Robinson	Sr
OL	55	Willie Tyler	Sr
OL	56	Renato Brown	Jr
OL	59	Mike Powell	Fr
OL	60	Sam Secrest	Fr
OL	61	Bryan Hudson	Sr
OL	64	Travis Taylor	Jr
OL	67	John Paul Flores	Fr
OL	68	Michael Gonzalez	Jr
OL	70	Trevonte Sylvester	So
OL	71	Joshua Black	Jr
OL	72	Emmanuel Sowders	GS
OL	73	Madden Sanker	Fr
OL	74	Eric Miller	Sr
OL	76	Luke Burgess	Fr
OL	78	Joe Crocker	Fr
OL	79	Makhete Gueye	Fr
WR	81	Cataurus Hicks	Fr
WR	82	Jahlil McClain	Fr
WR	83	Allan Houston	Sr
TE	84	Joey Gatewood	Sr
TE	85	Nate Kurisky	So
WR	86	Elijah Downing	So
WR	88	William Fowles	Fr
TE	89	Gage Reale	So

Defense

Pos.	#	Name	Class
DB	2	Jarvis Brownlee Jr.	Jr
DB	3	Quincy Riley	Jr
DB	4	Aaron Williams	Fr
LB	6	Stanquan Clark	Fr
DL	9	Ashton Gillotte	Jr
DB	10	Benjamin Perry	So
DB	11	Cam'Ron Kelly	Sr
LB	13	Gilbert Frierson	Sr
DL	14	Stephen Herron	Sr
LB	18	T. J. Capers	Fr
DB	21	D'Angelo Hutchinson	So
LB	22	Keith Brown	Jr
LB	24	Jaylin Alderman	Jr
DB	26	M. J. Griffin	Jr
DB	27	Devin Neal	Jr
DB	28	Trey Franklin	Jr
DB	29	Storm Duck	Sr
DB	30	Derrick Edwards	So
DB	31	Marcus Washington	Fr
LB	34	T. J. Quinn	So
LB	35	Antonio Watts	So
DB	36	Destin Cheirs	Fr
DB	37	Jeremy Hamilton	Fr
DB	38	Kevin Longstreet	Fr
DL	41	Ramon Puryear	Jr
LB	43	Jack Reiger	Sr
DL	44	Selah Brown	So
LB	46	Darrian Bell	Jr
DB	48	Dakadrien Saunders	So
DL	52	Saadiq Clements	Fr
LB	54	Jaxon Panariello	Fr
DL	58	Jeff Clark	Jr
DL	90	Jermayne Lole	GS
DL	91	Tawfiq Thomas	So
DL	92	Micah Carter	Fr
DL	93	Jared Dawson	So
DL	94	William Spencer	Fr
DL	95	Mason Reiger	Jr
DL	96	R. J. Sorensen	So
DL	97	Rodney McGraw	So
DL	98	Adonijah Green	Fr
DL	99	Dezmond Tell	Jr

Special teams

Pos.	#	Name	Class
LS	32	Hayden Travelstead	Fr
P	39	Carter Schwartz	Fr
K	40	Brock Travelstead	Jr
LS	48	Shai Kochav	So
K	92	Nick Lopez	Sr
P	93	Brady Hodges	Jr
K	94	Cole Hussung	So
K	98	Nick Keller	Fr

Head coach

- Jeff Brohm

Coordinators/assistant coaches

- Brian Brohm – Offensive coordinator/Quarterbacks
- Mark Hagen – Co-defensive coordinator/Defensive linemen
- Ron English – Co-defensive coordinator/Secondary
- Karl Maslowski – Special teams coordinator/Linebackers
- Chris Barclay – Running backs
- Steve Ellis – Cornerbacks
- Mark Ivey – Linebackers
- Garrick McGee – Wide receivers
- Richard Owens – Offensive lineman
- Ryan Wallace – Tight ends
- Dominic Reno – Director, strength and conditioning
- Brinson Manor – Assistant, strength and conditioning
- Geoff Stanford – Assistant, strength and conditioning
- Noah Fisher – Graduate assistant
- Me'Leick Miles – Graduate assistant
- Anthony Wales – Graduate assistant

Legend

- (C) Team captain
- (S) Suspended
- (I) Ineligible
- Injured
- Redshirt

Roster

== Game summaries ==
=== at Georgia Tech ===
Louisville Cardinals (0–0) at Georgia Tech Yellow Jackets (0–0) – Game summary

Quarter	1	2	3	4	Total
Louisville	6	7	10	16	39
Georgia Tech	0	28	0	6	34

at Mercedes-Benz Superdome • Atlanta, Georgia

- Date: September 1
- Game time: 7:30 p.m. EST
- Game weather: Temperature: 72 °F (22 °C) • Indoors
- Game attendance: 36,101
- Referee: Riley Johnson
- TV announcers (ESPN): Anish Shroff (play-by-play), Andre Ware (analyst), and Paul Carcaterra (sideline)

Game information

First quarter

- 12:13 LOU – Brock Travelstead 33-yard field goal – 3–0 Louisville, Drive: 5 plays, 12 yards, 1:30
- 0:21 LOU – Brock Travelstead 30-yard field goal – 6–0 Louisville, Drive: 10 plays, 79 yards, 4:26

Second quarter

- 11:50 GT – Brett Seither 2-yard pass from Haynes King (Gavin Stewart kick) – 7–6 Georgia Tech, Drive: 9 plays, 75 yards, 3:31
- 9:03 GT – Trey Cooley 1-yard run (Gavin Stewart kick) – 14–6 Georgia Tech, Drive: 4 plays, 72 yards, 1:43
- 5:42 LOU – Kevin Coleman Jr. 9-yard pass from Jack Plummer (Brock Travelstead kick) – 14–13 Georgia Tech, Drive: 6 plays, 75 yards, 3:21
- 3:17 GT – Trey Cooley 23-yard run (Gavin Stewart kick) – 21–13 Georgia Tech, Drive: 5 plays, 75 yards, 2:25
- 0:42 GT – Chase Lane 48-yard pass from Haynes King (Gavin Stewart kick) – 28–13 Georgia Tech, Drive: 3 plays, 65 yards, 1:12

Third quarter

- 8:19 LOU – Brock Travelstead 22-yard field goal – 28–16 Georgia Tech, Drive: 13 plays, 68 yards, 6:34
- 4:41 LOU – Jamari Thrash 5-yard pass from Jack Plummer (Brock Travelstead kick) – 28–23 Georgia Tech, Drive: 6 plays, 65 yards, 2:49

Fourth quarter

- 8:08 LOU – Jamari Thrash 20-yard pass from Jack Plummer (Jack Plummer two-point pass incomplete) – 29–28 Louisville, Drive: 7 plays, 80 yards, 2:58
- 3:41 LOU – Jawhar Jordan 74-yard run (Brock Travelstead kick) – 36–28 Louisville, Drive: 1 play, 74 yards, 0:12
- 2:37 LOU – Brock Travelstead 38-yard field goal – 39–28 Louisville, Drive: 4 plays, 8 yards, 0:22
- 1:07 GT – Eric Singleton Jr. 5-yard pass from Haynes King (Haynes King two-point pass incomplete) – 39–34 Louisville, Drive: 7 plays, 75 yards, 1:30

Statistics	LOU	GT
First downs	21	23
Plays–yards	65–474	70–488
Rushes–yards	34–227	38–175
Passing yards	247	313
Passing: comp–att–int	18–31–1	19–32–1
Turnovers		
Time of possession	29:54	30:06

Team	Category	Player	Statistics
Louisville	Passing	Jack Plummer	18/31, 247 yds, 3 TD, 1 INT
Louisville	Rushing	Jawhar Jordan	7 carries, 96 yards, 1 TD
Louisville	Receiving	Jamari Thrash	7 receptions, 88 yards, 2 TD
Georgia Tech	Passing	Haynes King	19/32, 313 yds, 3 TD, 1 INT
Georgia Tech	Rushing	Haynes King	10 carries, 53 yards
Georgia Tech	Receiving	Malik Rutherford	5 receptions, 85 yards

=== vs. Murray State ===
Louisville Cardinals (1–0) vs. Murray State Racers (1–0) – Game summary

Quarter	1	2	3	4	Total
Murray State	0	0	0	0	0
Louisville	7	21	14	14	56

at L&N Stadium • Louisville, Kentucky

- Date: September 7
- Game time: 7:30 p.m. EST
- Game weather: Sunny • Temperature: 73 °F (23 °C) • Wind: 7 mph NW
- Game attendance: 45,273
- Referee: Maurice Woods
- TV announcers (ACC Network): Chris Cotter (play-by-play), Mark Herzlich (analyst) and Sherree Burruss (sideline)

Game information

First quarter

- 10:06 LOU – Jamari Thrash 12-yard run (Brock Travelstead kick) – 7–0 Louisville, Drive: 6 plays, 76 yards, 2:58

Second quarter

- 14:38 LOU – Isaac Guerendo 1-yard run (Brock Travelstead kick) – 14–0 Louisville, Drive: 9 plays, 85 yards, 3:25
- 6:37 LOU – Jamari Thrash 73-yard pass from Jack Plummer (Brock Travelstead kick) – 21–0 Louisville, Drive: 2 plays, 69 yards, 0:44
- 2:37 LOU – Jawhar Jordan 72-yard run (Brock Travelstead kick) – 28–0 Louisville, Drive: 2 plays, 80 yards, 0:33

Third quarter

- 7:08 LOU – Jawhar Jordan 1-yard run (Brock Travelstead kick) – 35–0 Louisville, Drive: 6 plays, 59 yards, 2:30
- 0:58 LOU – Ahmari Higgins-Bruce 6-yard run (Nick Lopez kick) – 42–0 Louisville, Drive: 9 plays, 54 yards, 4:11

Fourth quarter

- 14:55 LOU – Keyjuan Brown 4-yard run (Brock Travelstead kick) – 49–0 Louisville, Drive: 3 plays, 36 yards, 0:57
- 9:44 LOU – Joey Gatewood 34-yard pass from Harrison Bailey (Nick Lopez kick) – 56–0 Louisville, Drive: 10 plays, 74 yards, 3:45

Statistics	MUR	LOU
First downs	8	29
Plays–yards	54–166	78–690
Rushes–yards	32–94	44–344
Passing yards	72	346
Passing: comp–att–int	8–22–1	25–34–2
Turnovers		
Time of possession	28:53	31:07

Team	Category	Player	Statistics
Murray State	Passing	DJ Williams	7/16, 68 yards
Murray State	Rushing	Kywon Morgan	11 carries, 34 yards
Murray State	Receiving	Jacob Bell	4 receptions, 26 yards
Louisville	Passing	Jack Plummer	16/22, 247 yards, 1 TD, 2 INT
Louisville	Rushing	Jawhar Jordan	7 carries, 135 yards, 2 TD
Louisville	Receiving	Jamari Thrash	3 receptions, 82 yards, 1 TD

=== vs. Indiana ===
Louisville Cardinals (2–0) vs. Indiana Hoosiers (1–1) – Game summary

Quarter	1	2	3	4	Total
Louisville	7	14	0	0	21
Indiana	0	0	14	0	14

at Lucas Oil Stadium • Indianapolis, Indiana

- Date: September 16
- Game time: 12:00 p.m. EST
- Game weather: Sunny
- Game attendance: 37,250
- Referee: Stuart Mullins
- TV announcers (BTN): Connor Onion (play-by-play), Brock Vereen (analyst), and Meghan McKeown (sideline)

Game information

First quarter

- 2:34 LOU – Jamari Thrash 85-yard pass from Jack Plummer (Brock Travelstead kick) – 7–0 Louisville, Drive: 2 plays, 85 yards, 0:15

Second quarter

- 7:44 LOU – Maurice Turner 2-yard run (Brock Travelstead kick) – 14–0 Louisville, Drive: 13 plays, 78 yards, 6:26
- 1:52 LOU – Jawhar Jordan 25-yard run (Brock Travelstead kick) – 21–0 Louisville, Drive: 7 plays, 69 yards, 2:18

Third quarter

- 13:46 IND – Jaylin Lucas 30-yard pass from Tayven Jackson (Chris Freeman kick) – 21–7 Louisville, Drive: 3 plays, 54 yards, 1:14
- 0:55 IND – Josh Henderson 2-yard run (Chris Freeman kick) – 21–14 Louisville, Drive: 13 plays, 97 yards, 7:27

Statistics	LOU	IU
First downs	20	19
Plays–yards	62–422	61–357
Rushes–yards	39–184	27–58
Passing yards	238	299
Passing: comp–att–int	13–23–1	24–34–1
Turnovers		
Time of possession	28:48	31:12

Team	Category	Player	Statistics
Louisville	Passing	Jack Plummer	13/23, 238 yards, 1 TD, 1 INT
Louisville	Rushing	Jawhar Jordan	18 carries, 113 yards, 1 TD
Louisville	Receiving	Jamari Thrash	4 receptions, 159 yards, 1 TD
Indiana	Passing	Tayven Jackson	24/34, 299 yards, 1 TD, 1 INT
Indiana	Rushing	Jaylin Lucas	8 carries, 29 yards
Indiana	Receiving	Jaylin Lucas	10 receptions, 98 yards, 1 TD

=== vs. Boston College ===
Boston College Eagles (1–2) at Louisville Cardinals (3–0) – Game summary

Quarter	1	2	3	4	Total
Boston College	0	14	7	7	28
Louisville	14	28	14	0	56

at L&N Stadium • Louisville, Kentucky

- Date: September 23
- Game time: 12:00 p.m. EST
- Game weather: Sunny • Temperature: 80 °F (27 °C) • Wind: 7 mph NE
- Game attendance: 48,294
- Referee: Jeff Flanagan
- TV announcers (ACC Network): Jorge Sedano (play-by-play), Orlando Franklin (analyst) and Marilyn Paine (sideline)

Game information

First quarter

- 9:47 LOU – Jawhar Jordan 33-yard run (Brock Travelstead kick) – 7–0 Louisville, Drive: 5 plays, 59 yards, 2:19
- 3:21 LOU – Nate Kurisky 1-yard pass from Jack Plummer (Brock Travelstead kick) – 14–0 Louisville, Drive: 11 plays, 62 yards, 5:09

Second quarter

- 14:12 LOU – Ahmari Huggins-Bruce 45-yard pass from Jack Plummer (Brock Travelstead kick) – 21–0 Louisville, Drive: 5 plays, 70 yards, 2:05
- 8:43 LOU – Jack Plummer 9-yard run (Brock Travelstead kick) – 28–0 Louisville, Drive: 8 plays, 61 yards, 4:04
- 5:38 BC – Thomas Castellanos 39-yard run (Liam Connor kick) – 28–7 Louisville, Drive: 7 plays, 75 yards, 3:05
- 3:19 LOU – Jawhar Jordan 2-yard run (Brock Travelstead kick) – 35–7 Louisville, Drive: 4 plays, 55 yards, 2:11
- 0:33 BC – Ryan O'Keefe 30-yard pass from Thomas Castellanos (Liam Connor kick) – 35–14 Louisville, Drive: 8 plays, 75 yards, 2:46
- 0:08 LOU – Jamari Thrash 42-yard pass from Jack Plummer (Brock Travelstead kick) – 42–14 Louisville, Drive: 3 plays, 75 yards, 0:25

Third quarter

- 14:46 LOU – Jawhar Jordan 75-yard pass from Jack Plummer (Brock Travelstead kick) – 49–14 Louisville, Drive: 1 play, 75 yards, 0:14
- 12:53 BC – Lewis Bond 22-yard pass from Thomas Castellanos (Liam Connor kick) – 49–21 Louisville, Drive: 7 plays, 75 yards, 1:53
- 10:04 LOU – Ahmari Huggins-Bruce 55-yard pass from Jack Plummer (Brock Travelstead kick) – 56–21 Louisville, Drive: 1 play, 55 yards, 0:09

Fourth quarter

- 14:33 BC – Lewis Bond 11-yard pass from Thomas Castellanos (Liam Connor kick) – 56–28 Louisville, Drive: 9 plays, 72 yards, 2:46

Statistics	BC	LOU
First downs	23	22
Plays–yards	72–427	62–582
Rushes–yards	31–132	41–194
Passing yards	295	388
Passing: comp–att–int	21–41–0	18–21–0
Turnovers		
Time of possession	25:24	34:36

Team	Category	Player	Statistics
Boston College	Passing	Thomas Castellanos	17/33, 265 yards, 3 TD
Boston College	Rushing	Thomas Castellanos	10 carries, 49 yards, 1 TD
Boston College	Receiving	Ryan O'Keefe	5 receptions, 86 yards, 1 TD
Louisville	Passing	Jack Plummer	18/21, 388 yards, 5 TD
Louisville	Rushing	Jawhar Jordan	18 carries, 134 yards, 2 TD
Louisville	Receiving	Ahmari Huggins-Bruce	3 receptions, 110 yards, 2 TD

=== at NC State ===
Louisville Cardinals (4–0) at NC State Wolfpack (3–1) – Game summary

Quarter	1	2	3	4	Total
Louisville	0	0	10	3	13
NC State	0	10	0	0	10

at Carter–Finley Stadium • Raleigh, North Carolina

- Date: September 29
- Game time: 7:00 p.m. EST
- Game weather: Sunny • Temperature: 69 °F (21 °C) • Wind: 4 mph NE
- Game attendance: 56,919
- Referee: Jerry Magallanes
- TV announcers (ESPN): Anish Shroff (play-by-play), Andre Ware (analyst), and Paul Carcaterra (sideline)

Game information

Second quarter

- 6:27 NCST – Delbert Mimms III 4-yard run (Brayden Narveson kick) – 7–0 NC State, Drive: 13 plays, 65 yards, 6:54
- 0:00 NCST – Brayden Narveson 48-yard field goal – 10–0 NC State, Drive: 4 plays, 1 yard, 0:49

Third quarter

- 6:38 LOU – Chris Bell 39-yard pass from Jack Plummer (Brock Travelstead kick) – 10–7 NC State, Drive: 3 plays, 46 yards, 0:56
- 1:32 LOU – Brock Travelstead 33-yard field goal – 10–10, Drive: 7 plays, 40 yards, 3:13

Fourth quarter

- 5:32 LOU – Brock Travelstead 53-yard field goal – 13–10 Louisville, Drive: 10 plays, 41 yards, 5:13

Statistics	LOU	NCSU
First downs	18	9
Plays–yards	64–306	56–201
Rushes–yards	29–20	31–89
Passing yards	286	112
Passing: comp–att–int	21–35–2	13–25–2
Turnovers		
Time of possession	31:03	28:57

Team	Category	Player	Statistics
Louisville	Passing	Jack Plummer	21/35, 286 yards, 1 TD, 2 INT
Louisville	Rushing	Jawhar Jordan	16 carries, 32 yards
Louisville	Receiving	Chris Bell	3 receptions, 85 yards, 1 TD
NC State	Passing	Brennan Armstrong	13/25, 112 yards, 2 INT
NC State	Rushing	Brennan Armstrong	17 carries, 61 yards
NC State	Receiving	Terrell Timmons Jr.	3 receptions, 71 yards

=== vs. No. 10 Notre Dame ===
No. 10 Notre Dame Fighting Irish (5–1) at No. 25 Louisville Cardinals (5–0) – Game summary

Quarter	1	2	3	4	Total
No. 10 Notre Dame	0	7	6	7	20
No. 25 Louisville	7	0	10	16	33

at L&N Stadium • Louisville, Kentucky

- Date: October 7
- Game time: 7:37 p.m. EST
- Game weather: Sunny, 57 °F (14 °C)
- Game attendance: 59,081
- Referee: Gary Patterson
- TV announcers (ABC): Joe Tessitore (play-by-play), Jordan Rodgers (analyst), and Katie George (sideline)

Game information

First quarter

- 6:05 LOU – Jamari Thrash 9-yard pass from Jack Plummer (Brock Travelstead kick) – 7–0 Louisville, Drive: 12 plays, 70 yards, 7:06

Second quarter

- 6:58 ND – Jordan Faison 36-yard pass from Sam Hartman (Spencer Shrader kick) – 7–7, Drive: 11 plays, 88 yards, 5:45

Third quarter

- 13:18 ND – Spencer Shrader 53-yard field goal – 10–7 Notre Dame, Drive: 4 plays, 4 yards, 1:35
- 8:24 LOU – Brock Travelstead 44-yard field goal – 10–10, Drive: 9 plays, 48 yards, 4:54
- 5:45 LOU – Jawhar Jordan 45-yard run (Brock Travelstead kick) – 17–10 Louisville, Drive: 2 plays, 64 yards, 0:43
- 1:06 ND – Spencer Shrader 54-yard field goal – 17–13 Louisville, Drive: 7 plays, 27 yards, 4:39

Fourth quarter

- 11:12 LOU – Jawhar Jordan 21-yard run (Brock Travelstead kick) – 24–13 Louisville, Drive: 11 plays, 75 yards, 4:54
- 7:31 LOU – Brock Travelstead 45-yard field goal – 27–13 Louisville, Drive: 4 plays, 7 yards, 2:11
- 5:02 LOU – Brock Travelstead 32-yard field goal – 30–13 Louisville, Drive: 4 plays, −4 yards, 2:18
- 3:12 LOU – Brock Travelstead 35-yard field goal – 33–13 Louisville, Drive: 4 plays, 8 yards, 0:22
- 1:35 ND – Mitchell Evans 6-yard pass from Sam Hartman (Spencer Shrader kick) – 33–20 Louisville, Drive: 7 plays, 75 yards, 1:37

Statistics	ND	LOU
First downs	16	17
Plays–yards	66–298	64–330
Rushes–yards	28–44	40–185
Passing yards	254	145
Passing: comp–att–int	22–38–3	17–24–0
Turnovers		
Time of possession	28:43	31:17

Team	Category	Player	Statistics
Notre Dame	Passing	Sam Hartman	22/38, 254 yards, 2 TD, 3 INT
Notre Dame	Rushing	Jeremiyah Love	5 carries, 37 yards
Notre Dame	Receiving	Mitchell Evans	4 receptions, 71 yards, 1 TD
Louisville	Passing	Jack Plummer	17/24, 145 yards, 1 TD
Louisville	Rushing	Jawhar Jordan	21 carries, 143 yards, 2 TD
Louisville	Receiving	Jamari Thrash	8 receptions, 75 yards, 1 TD

=== at Pittsburgh ===
No. 14 Louisville Cardinals (6–0) at Pittsburgh Pathers (1–4) – Game summary

Quarter	1	2	3	4	Total
No. 14 Louisville	7	14	0	0	21
Pittsburgh	7	7	17	7	38

at Acrisure Stadium • Pittsburgh, Pennsylvania

- Date: October 14
- Game time: 6:30 p.m. EST
- Game weather: Rain • Temperature: 51 °F (11 °C) • Wind: 7 mph NW
- Game attendance: 46,296
- Referee: Jeff Heaser
- TV announcers (CW Network): Tom Werme (play-by-play), James Bates (analyst), Treavor Scales (sideline)

Game information

First quarter

- 11:39 LOU – Chris Bell 7-yard pass from Jack Plummer (Brock Travelstead kick) – 7–0 Louisville, Drive: 5 plays, 40 yards, 2:08
- 2:37 PIT – Bub Means 46-yd pass from Christian Veilleux (Ben Sauls kick) – 7–7, Drive: 3 plays, 70 yards, 1:13

Second quarter

- 11:43 LOU – Isaac Guerendo 1-yard run (Brock Travelstead kick) – 14–7 Louisville, Drive: 10 plays, 75 yards, 3:17
- 1:23 PIT – C'Bo Flemister 1-yard run (Ben Sauls kick) – 14–14, Drive: 10 plays, 71 yards, 5:00
- 0:25 LOU – Isaac Guerendo 5-yard run (Brock Travelstead kick) – 21–14 Louisville, Drive: 7 plays, 75 yards, 0:58

Third quarter

- 11:32 PIT – Ben Sauls 46-yard field goal – 21–17 Louisville, Drive: 4 plays, 6 yards, 1:32
- 3:39 PIT – C'Bo Flemister 3-yard run (Ben Sauls kick) – 24–21 Pittsburgh, Drive: 13 plays, 61 yards, 6:44
- 0:14 PIT – M.J. Devonshire 86-yard interception (Ben Sauls kick) – 31–21 Pittsburgh

Fourth quarter

- 3:03 PIT – Konata Mumpfield 31-yard pass from Christian Veilleux (Ben Sauls kick) – 38–21 Pittsburgh, Drive: 4 plays, 36 yards, 0:25

Statistics	LOU	PITT
First downs	28	13
Plays–yards	86–430	60–288
Rushes–yards	33–80	33–88
Passing yards	350	200
Passing: comp–att–int	29–52–2	12–26–0
Turnovers		
Time of possession	33:11	26:49

Team	Category	Player	Statistics
Louisville	Passing	Jack Plummer	29/52, 350 yards, 1 TD, 2 INT
Louisville	Rushing	Maurice Turner	12 carries, 81 yards
Louisville	Receiving	Jamari Thrash	9 receptions, 120 yards
Pittsburgh	Passing	Christian Veilleux	12/26, 200 yards, 2 TD
Pittsburgh	Rushing	Rodney Hammond	11 carries, 50 yards
Pittsburgh	Receiving	Bub Means	4 receptions, 71 yards, 1 TD

=== vs. No. 20 Duke ===
No. 20 Duke Blue Devils (5–2) at No. 18 Louisville Cardinals (6–1) – Game summary

Quarter	1	2	3	4	Total
No. 20 Duke	0	0	0	0	0
No. 18 Louisville	14	3	6	0	23

at L&N Stadium • Louisville, Kentucky

- Date: October 28
- Game time: 3:30 p.m. EST
- Game weather: Cloudy • Temperature: 63 °F (17 °C) • Wind: 4 mph N
- Game attendance: 52,319
- Referee: Jerry Magallanes
- TV announcers (ESPN): Sean McDonough (play-by-play), Greg McElroy (analyst), Molly McGrath (sideline)

Game information

First quarter

- 7:13 LOU – Jawhar Jordan 14-yard run (Brock Travelstead kick) – 7–0 Louisville, Drive: 10 plays, 72 yards, 5:19
- 1:01 LOU – Jawhar Jordan 23-yard run (Brock Travelstead kick) – 14–0 Louisville, Drive: 6 plays, 49 yards, 3:09

Second quarter

- 0:49 LOU – Brock Travelstead 47-yard field goal – 17–0 Louisville, Drive: 9 plays, 59 yards, 3:49

Third quarter

- 7:32 LOU – Brock Travelstead 20-yard field goal – 20–0 Louisville, Drive: 14 plays, 72 yards, 7:28
- 3:24 LOU – Brock Travelstead 24-yard field goal – 23–0 Louisville, Drive: 4 plays, 8 yards, 2:31

Statistics	DUKE	LOU
First downs	9	20
Plays–yards	49–202	64–351
Rushes–yards	21–51	48–234
Passing yards	151	117
Passing: comp–att–int	12–28–1	11–16–0
Turnovers		
Time of possession	23:09	36:51

Team	Category	Player	Statistics
Duke	Passing	Riley Leonard	9/23, 121 yards, 1 INT
Duke	Rushing	Jordan Waters	5 carries, 23 yards
Duke	Receiving	Jordan Moore	6 receptions, 92 yards
Louisville	Passing	Jack Plummer	11/16, 117 yards
Louisville	Rushing	Jawhar Jordan	21 carries, 163 yards, 2 TD
Louisville	Receiving	Jamari Thrash	7 receptions, 73 yards

=== vs. Virginia Tech ===
Virginia Tech Hokies (4–4) at No. 13 Louisville Cardinals (7–1) – Game summary

Quarter	1	2	3	4	Total
Virginia Tech	0	3	0	0	3
No. 13 Louisville	7	7	13	7	34

at L&N Stadium • Louisville, Kentucky

- Date: November 4
- Game time: 3:30 p.m. EST
- Game weather: Cloudy • Temperature: 66 °F (19 °C) • Wind: 9 mph SW
- Game attendance: 49,945
- Referee: Tim Hedgepeth
- TV announcers (ACCN): Chris Cotter (play-by-play), Mark Herzlich (analyst), Ashley Stroehlein (sideline)

Game information

First quarter

- 6:53 LOU – Jawhar Jordan 1-yard run (Brock Travelstead kick) – 7–0 Louisville, Drive: 9 plays, 49 yards, 5:45

Second quarter

- 14:52 LOU – Isaac Guerendo 39-yard run (Brock Travelstead kick) – 14–0 Louisville, Drive: 6 plays, 88 yards, 2:50
- 0:00 VT – John Love 44-yard field goal – 14–3 Louisville, Drive: 12 plays, 53 yards, 6:03

Third quarter

- 9:38 LOU – Jadon Thompson 37-yard pass from Jack Plummer (Brock Travelstead kick) – 21–3 Louisville, Drive: 5 plays, 63 yards, 2:17
- 6:58 LOU – Isaac Guerendo 12-yard run (Missed PAT) – 27–3 Louisville, Drive: 3 plays, 35 yards, 1:23

Fourth quarter

- 8:16 LOU – Isaac Guerendo 36-yard run (Brock Travelstead kick) – 34–3 Louisville, Drive: 2 plays, 44 yards, 0:50

Statistics	VT	LOU
First downs	12	17
Plays–yards	51–140	51–382
Rushes–yards	28–68	38–231
Passing yards	72	151
Passing: comp–att–int	13–23–1	12–13–0
Turnovers		
Time of possession	27:45	32:15

Team	Category	Player	Statistics
Virginia Tech	Passing	Kyron Drones	12/21, 69 yards, 1 INT
Virginia Tech	Rushing	Bhayshul Tuten	11 carries, 57 yards
Virginia Tech	Receiving	Da'Quan Felton	4 receptions, 34 yards
Louisville	Passing	Jack Plummer	11/12, 141 yards, 1 TD
Louisville	Rushing	Isaac Guerendo	11 carries, 146 yards, 3 TD
Louisville	Receiving	Jadon Thompson	2 receptions, 49 yards, 1 TD

=== vs. Virginia ===
Virginia Cavaliers (2–7) at No. 11 Louisville Cardinals (8–1) – Game summary

Quarter	1	2	3	4	Total
Virginia	0	0	21	3	24
No. 11 Louisville	7	7	0	17	31

at L&N Stadium • Louisville, Kentucky

- Date: November 9
- Game time: 7:30 p.m. EST
- Game weather: Cloudy • Temperature: 58 °F (14 °C) • Wind: 6 mph NE
- Game attendance: 44,628
- Referee: Marcus Woods
- TV announcers (ESPN): Matt Barrie (play-by-play), Dan Mullen (analyst), Harry Lyles Jr. (sideline)

Game information

First quarter

- 6:42 LOU – Joey Gatewood 4-yard pass from Jack Plummer (Brock Travelstead kick) – 7–0 Louisville, Drive: 5 plays, 60 yards, 3:04

Second quarter

- 3:01 LOU – Jimmy Calloway 0-yard punt return (Brock Travelstead kick) – 14–0 Louisville

Third quarter

- 4:15 UVA – Jack Griese 1-yard run (Will Bettridge kick) – 14–7 Louisville, Drive: 11 plays, 80 yards, 4:25
- 4:05 UVA – Kam Robinson 28-yard interception (Will Bettridge kick) – 14–14
- 0:49 UVA – Malik Washington 42-yard pass from Anthony Colandrea (Will Bettridge kick) – 21–14 Virginia, Drive: 3 plays, 61 yards, 1:45

Fourth quarter

- 11:15 LOU – Brock Travelstead 35-yard field goal – 21–17 Virginia, Drive: 10 plays, 52 yards, 4:26
- 7:54 UVA – Will Bettridge 38-yard field goal – 24–17 Virginia, Drive: 8 plays, 54 yards, 3:21
- 6:20 LOU – Ahmari Huggins-Bruce 52-yard pass from Jack Plummer (Brock Travelstead kick) – 24–24, Drive: 4 plays, 86 yards, 1:27
- 3:24 LOU – Isaac Guerendo 73-yard run (Brock Travelstead kick) – 31–24 Louisville, Drive: 1 play, 73 yards, 0:12

Statistics	UVA	LOU
First downs	21	19
Plays–yards	68–434	59–423
Rushes–yards	36–120	31–180
Passing yards	314	243
Passing: comp–att–int	20–32–1	19–28–1
Turnovers		
Time of possession	30:08	29:52

Team	Category	Player	Statistics
Virginia	Passing	Anthony Colandrea	20/31, 314 yards, 1 TD, 1 INT
Virginia	Rushing	Anthony Colandrea	14 carries, 89 yards
Virginia	Receiving	Malik Washington	9 receptions, 155 yards, 1 TD
Louisville	Passing	Jack Plummer	19/28, 243 yards, 2 TD, 1 INT
Louisville	Rushing	Jawhar Jordan	17 carries, 95 yards
Louisville	Receiving	Ahmari Huggins-Bruce	1 receptions, 52 yards, 1 TD

=== at Miami (rivalry) ===
No. 10 Louisville Cardinals (9–1) at Miami Hurricanes (6–4) – Game summary

Quarter	1	2	3	4	Total
No. 10 Louisville	14	6	3	15	38
Miami	14	7	7	3	31

at Hard Rock Stadium • Miami Gardens, Florida

- Date: November 18
- Game time: 12:00 p.m. EST
- Game weather: Cloudy • Temperature: 75 °F (24 °C) • Wind: 10 mph NW
- Game attendance: 44,996
- Referee: Gary Patterson
- TV announcers (ABC): Sean McDonough (play-by-play), Greg McElroy (analyst), Molly McGrath (sideline)

Game information

First quarter

- 8:02 LOU – Nate Kurisky 2-yard pass from Jack Plummer (Brock Travelstead kick) 7–0 Louisville, Drive: 9 plays, 69 yards, 4:50
- 6:06 MIA – Mark Fletcher Jr. 21-yard run (Andres Borregales kick) – 7–7, Drive: 5 plays, 75 yards, 1:56
- 3:17 MIA – Xavier Restrepo 15-yard pass from Tyler Van Dyke (Andres Borregales kick) – 14–7 Miami, Drive: 4 plays, 50 yards, 1:32
- 0:18 LOU – Isaac Guerendo 12-yard run (Brock Travelstead kick) – 14–14, Drive: 5 plays, 45 yards, 2:49

Second quarter

- 7:42 MIA – Brashard Smith 34-yard run (Andres Borregales kick) – 21–14 Miami, Drive: 11 plays, 82 yards, 5:39
- 0:08 LOU – Trevonte Sylvester 1-yard pass from Jack Plummer (Missed PAT) – 21–20 Miami, Drive: 11 plays, 77 yards, 2:08

Third quarter

- 11:28 LOU – Nick Lopez 40-yard field goal – 23–21 Louisville, Drive: 8 plays, 46 yards, 3:27
- 5:48 MIA – Mark Fletcher Jr. 1-yard run (Andres Borregales kick) – 28–23 Miami, Drive: 3 plays, 55 yards, 1:15
- 11:02 LOU – Evan Conley 5-yard run (Jamari Thrash pass from Jack Plummer) – 31–28 Louisville, Drive: 11 plays, 89 yards, 4:54

Fourth quarter

- 5:34 MIA – Andres Borregales 51-yard field goal – 31–31, Drive: 11 plays, 42 yards, 5:28
- 4:17 LOU – Kevin Coleman Jr. 58-yard pass from Jack Plummer (Nick Lopez kick) – 38–31 Louisville, Drive: 3 plays, 75 yards, 1:17

Statistics	LOU	MIA
First downs	26	21
Plays–yards	71–470	65–486
Rushes–yards	34–162	26–159
Passing yards	308	327
Passing: comp–att–int	24–37–1	24–39–0
Turnovers		
Time of possession	30:21	29:39

Team	Category	Player	Statistics
Louisville	Passing	Jack Plummer	24/37, 308 yards, 3 TD, 1 INT
Louisville	Rushing	Isaac Guerendo	15 carries, 93 yards, 1 TD
Louisville	Receiving	Kevin Coleman	2 receptions, 58 yards, 1 TD
Miami	Passing	Tyler Van Dyke	24/39, 327 yards, 1 TD
Miami	Rushing	Mark Fletcher Jr.	17 carries, 126 yards, 2 TD
Miami	Receiving	Xavier Restrepo	8 receptions, 193 yards, 1 TD

=== vs. Kentucky (rivalry) ===
Game Twelve – Kentucky Wildcats (6–5) at No. 10 Louisville Cardinals (10–1) – Game summary

Quarter	1	2	3	4	Total
Kentucky	0	7	14	17	38
No. 10 Louisville	7	3	14	7	31

at L&N Stadium • Louisville, Kentucky

- Date: Saturday, November 25, 2023
- Game time: 12:00 p.m. EST
- Game attendance: 59,225
- Referee: Lee Hendrick
- TV announcers (ABC): Joe Tessitore (play-by-play), Jesse Palmer (color), Katie George (sideline)

Game information

First quarter

- (3:40) LOU – Jawhar Jordan 1-yard run (Nick Lopez kick) (Drive: 14 plays, 70 yards, 8:19; Louisville 7-0)

Second quarter

- (8:07) UK – Dane Key 9-yard pass from Devin Leary (Alex Raynor kick) (Drive: 9 plays, 52 yards, 5:19; Tied 7-7)
- (4:25) LOU – Brock Travelstead 46-yard field goal (Drive: 7 plays, 31 yards, 3:33; Louisville 10-7)

Third quarter

- (5:50) LOU – Jawhar Jordan 1-yard run (Nick Lopez kick) (Drive: 15 plays, 75 yards, 9:10; Louisville 17-7)
- (5:38) UK – Barion Brown 100-yard kickoff return (Alex Raynor kick) (Drive: 0 plays, 100 yards, 0:12; Louisville 17-14)
- (2:48) LOU – Joey Gatewood 11-yard pass from Jack Plummer (Nick Lopez kick) (Drive: 5 plays, 51 yards, 2:41; Louisville 24-14)
- (1:49) UK – Ray Davis 20-yard pass from Devin Leary (Alex Raynor kick) (Drive: 2 plays, 75 yards, 0:59; Louisville 24-21)

Fourth quarter

- (10:21) UK – Alex Raynor 46-yard field goal (Drive: 10 plays, 20 yards, 4:45; Tied 24-24)
- (8:37) UK – Ray Davis 20-yard pass from Devin Leary (Alex Raynor kick) (Drive: 2 plays, 22 yards, 0:46; Kentucky 31-24)
- (2:33) LOU – Ahmari Huggins-Bruce 21-yard pass from Jack Plummer (Nick Lopez kick) (Drive: 4 plays, 25 yards, 2:01; Tied 31-31)
- (1:02) UK – Ray Davis 37-yard run (Alex Raynor kick) (Drive: 4 plays, 75 yards, 1:31; Kentucky 38-31)

Statistics	UK	LOU
First downs	16	23
Total yards	47–289	76–403
Rushing yards	25–83	43–161
Passing yards	206	242
Passing: Comp–Att–Int	12–22–1	24–33–1
Time of possession	23:26	36:34

Team	Category	Player	Statistics
Kentucky	Passing	Devin Leary	12/22, 206 yards, 3 TD, INT
Kentucky	Rushing	Ray Davis	14 carries, 76 yards, TD
Kentucky	Receiving	Izayah Cummings	1 reception, 55 yards
Louisville	Passing	Jack Plummer	24/33, 242 yards, 2 TD, INT
Louisville	Rushing	Jawhar Jordan	17 carries, 67 yards, 2 TD
Louisville	Receiving	Jamari Thrash	6 receptions, 60 yards

=== vs. No. 4 Florida State (ACC Championship Game) ===
No. 4 Florida State Seminoles (12–0) vs. No. 14 Louisville Cardinals (10–2) – Game summary

Quarter	1	2	3	4	Total
No. 14 Louisville	0	0	3	3	6
No. 4 Florida State	0	3	7	6	16

at Bank of America Stadium • Charlotte, North Carolina

- Date: December 2
- Game time: 8:00 p.m. EST
- Game weather: 65 °F (18 °C) • Wind: SE @ 8 mph (13 km/h) • Weather: Cloudy
- Game attendance: 62,314
- Referee: Mike Roche
- TV announcers (ABC): Joe Tessitore, Jesse Palmer, Katie George

Game information
First quarter
- No Scoring

Second quarter

- (10:32) Florida State – Ryan Fitzgerald 45 yard field goal, (Drive: 11 plays, 50 yards, 5:01; Florida State 3–0)

Third quarter

- (7:02) Louisville – Brock Travelstead 36 yard field goal, (Drive: 13 plays, 56 yards, 6:20; Tied 3–3)
- (6:20) Florida State – Lawrance Toafili 2 yard rush, Fitzgerald kick, (Drive: 2 plays, 75 yards, 0:42; Florida State 10–3)

Fourth quarter

- (13:36) Louisville – Travelstead 33 yard field goal, (Drive: 8 plays, 43 yards, 3:10; Florida State 10–6)
- (3:13) Florida State – Fitzgerald 33 yard field goal, (Drive: 6 plays, 34 yards, 2:52; Florida State 13–6)
- (2:19) Florida State – Fitzgerald 40 yard field goal, (Drive: 4 plays, -2 yards, 0:16; Florida State 16–6)

Statistics	LOU	FSU
First downs	10	12
Plays–yards	70–188	65–219
Rushes–yards	34–77	44–164
Passing yards	111	55
Passing: comp–att–int	14–36–1	8–21–0
Turnovers		
Time of possession	28:32	31:28

Team	Category	Player	Statistics
Louisville	Passing	Jack Plummer	14/36, 111 yards, 1 INT
Louisville	Rushing	Jawhar Jordan	14 carries, 52 yards
Louisville	Receiving	Jamari Thrash	7 receptions, 52 yards
Florida State	Passing	Brock Glenn	8/21, 55 yards
Florida State	Rushing	Lawrance Toafili	10 carries, 118 yards, 1 TD
Florida State	Receiving	Johnny Wilson	2 receptions, 21 yards

=== vs. USC (Holiday Bowl) ===
2023 DirectTV Holiday Bowl
No. 15 Louisville Cardinals (10–3, 7–1) vs. USC Trojans (7–5, 5–4) – Game summary

Quarter	1	2	3	4	Total
No. 15 Cardinals	7	7	7	7	28
Trojans	7	21	7	7	42

at Petco Park • San Diego, California

- Date: December 27
- Game time: 8:00 p.m. EST/5:00 p.m. PST
- Game weather: Clear • Temperature: 61 °F (16 °C) • Wind: 5 mph (8.0 km/h) NW
- Game attendance: 35,317
- Referee: Lee Hedrick
- TV announcers (FOX): Gus Johnson (play-by-play), Joel Klatt (analyst) and Jenny Taft (Sideline Reporter)
- Box score

Game information

First quarter

- (8:37) LOU – Isaac Guerendo 2-yard run, Nick Lopez kick (Drive: 10 plays, 71 yards, 5:10; Louisville 7–0)
- (4:25) USC – Tahj Washington 17-yard pass from Miller Moss, Denis Lynch kick (Drive: 3 plays, 19 yards, 1:33; Tied 7–7)

Second quarter

- (8:07) USC – Tahj Washington 29-yard pass from Miller Moss, Denis Lynch kick (Drive: 5 plays, 80 yards, 2:13; USC 14–7)
- (6:30) USC – Kyron Hudson 9-yard pass from Miller Moss, Denis Lynch kick (Drive: 2 plays, 18 yards, 0:39; USC 21–7)
- (1:56) LOU – Evan Conley 9-yard run, Nick Lopez kick (Drive: 9 plays, 73 yards, 4:34; USC 21–14)
- (0:19) USC – Ja'Kobi Lane 31-yard pass from Miller Moss, Denis Lynch kick (Drive: 3 plays, 34 yards, 1:15; USC 28–14)

Third quarter

- (9:43) LOU – Isaac Guerendo 1-yard run, Nick Lopez kick (Drive: 6 plays, 39 yards, 2:41; USC 28–21)
- (4:51) USC – Ja'Kobi Lane 12-yard pass from Miller Moss, Denis Lynch kick (Drive: 11 plays, 53 yards, 4:52; USC 35–21)

Fourth quarter

- (12:51) LOU – Isaac Guerendo 2-yard run, Nick Lopez kick (Drive: 12 plays, 72 yards, 7:00; USC 35–28)
- (10:00) USC – Duce Robinson 44-yard pass from Miller Moss, Denis Lynch kick (Drive: 7 plays, 75 yards, 2:51; USC 42–28)

Statistics	No. 15 Louisville	USC
First downs	22	19
Plays–yards	70–361	52–443
Rushes–yards	45–220	19–71
Passing yards	141	372
Passing: comp–att–int	21–25–0	23–33–1
Turnovers		
Time of possession	36:34	23:26

Team	Category	Player	Statistics
No. 15 Louisville	Passing	Jack Plummer	21–25, 141 yds
No. 15 Louisville	Rushing	Isaac Guerendo	23 cars, 161 yds, 3 TDs
No. 15 Louisville	Receiving	Isaac Guerendo	5 rec, 42 yds
USC	Passing	Miller Moss	23–33, 372 yds, 6 TDs, 1 Int
USC	Rushing	Austin Jones	11 cars, 60 yds
USC	Receiving	Tahj Washington	7 rec, 99 yds, 2 TDs

== Rankings ==
Ranking movements Legend: ██ Increase in ranking ██ Decrease in ranking — = Not ranked RV = Received votes
	Week															
Poll	Pre	1	2	3	4	5	6	7	8	9	10	11	12	13	14	Final
AP	RV	RV	—	RV	RV	25	14	21	18	15	11	9	9	15	16	19
Coaches	—	RV	RV	RV	RV	25	15	21	18	15	11	9	9	14	15	18
CFP	Not released									13	11	10	10	14	15	Not released

== Players drafted into the NFL ==
Round	Pick	Player	Position	NFL Club
4	129	Isaac Guerendo	RB	San Francisco 49ers
5	146	Jarvis Brownlee Jr.	CB	Tennessee Titans
5	156	Jamari Thrash	WR	Cleveland Browns
6	205	Jawhar Jordan	RB	Houston Texans
