= 2023 ACC Championship Game =

Postseason college football bowl game

- Conference Championship
| Louisville Cardinals | Florida State Seminoles |
| (10–2) | (12–0) |
| 6 | 16 |
| Head coach: Jeff Brohm | Head coach: Mike Norvell |
| AP / Coaches / CFP; 15 / 14 / 14 | AP / Coaches / CFP; 4 / 4 / 4 |
| | 1 | 2 | 3 | 4 | Total |
|---|---|---|---|---|---|
| Louisville | 0 | 0 | 3 | 3 | 6 |
| Florida State | 0 | 3 | 7 | 6 | 16 |
- Date: December 2, 2023
- Season: 2023
- Stadium: Bank of America Stadium
- Location: Charlotte, North Carolina
- MVP: Lawrance Toafili, RB, Florida State
- Favorite: Louisville by 1.5
- Attendance: 62,314

United States TV coverage
- Network: ABC; ESPN Radio
- Announcers: ABC: Joe Tessitore (play-by-play), Jesse Palmer (analyst) and Katie George (sideline reporter); ESPN Radio: Marc Kestecher (play-by-play), Kelly Stouffer (analyst) and Ian Fitzsimmons (sideline reporter)

International TV coverage
- Network: ESPN Brazil
- Announcers: Matheus Pinheiro (play-by-play) and Eduardo Zolin (analyst)

2023 Atlantic Coast Conference football standings
| | Conf. | | | Overall |
| Team | W | | L | W | | L |
|---|---|---|---|---|---|---|
| No. 6 Florida State y$ | 8 | – | 0 | 13 | – | 1 |
| No. 19 Louisville y | 7 | – | 1 | 10 | – | 4 |
| No. 21 NC State | 6 | – | 2 | 9 | – | 4 |
| Georgia Tech | 5 | – | 3 | 7 | – | 6 |
| Virginia Tech | 5 | – | 3 | 7 | – | 6 |
| No. 20 Clemson | 4 | – | 4 | 9 | – | 4 |
| Duke | 4 | – | 4 | 8 | – | 5 |
| North Carolina | 4 | – | 4 | 8 | – | 5 |
| Boston College | 3 | – | 5 | 7 | – | 6 |
| Miami (FL) | 3 | – | 5 | 7 | – | 6 |
| Syracuse | 2 | – | 6 | 6 | – | 7 |
| Pittsburgh | 2 | – | 6 | 3 | – | 9 |
| Virginia | 2 | – | 6 | 3 | – | 9 |
| Wake Forest | 1 | – | 7 | 4 | – | 8 |
Championship: Florida State 16, Louisville 6
$ – Conference champion; y – Championship game participant; Rankings from AP Poll

The 2023 ACC Championship Game was a college football conference championship game played on December 2, 2023, at Bank of America Stadium in Charlotte, North Carolina to determine the champion of the Atlantic Coast Conference (ACC) for the 2023 season. The game featured the Florida State Seminoles and the Louisville Cardinals. The 19th annual ACC Championship Game was held at 8:14 p.m. EST on ABC.

== Elimination of divisions ==
On June 28, 2022, the ACC approved a new football schedule format, set to take effect in the 2023 season. Under this format participation in the ACC championship game will no longer be determined by the winners of the now eliminated divisions. Instead, the two teams with the highest conference winning percentage will play in the Championship game.

== Teams ==
The 2023 ACC Championship Game featured the Florida State Seminoles, with an 8–0 conference record, representing the #1 seed, and the Louisville Cardinals, with a 7–1 conference record, representing the #2 seed. It will be the teams' 24th meeting, with Florida State leading the series 17–6.

This was the sixth ACC title game appearance for Florida State and their first since 2014. They are 4–1 overall in previous appearances. Louisville made their first ACC championship game appearance.

=== Florida State ===
The Seminoles clinched a spot in the game following their defeat of Pittsburgh on November 4. They finished the regular season 12–0 (8–0 ACC), and the designated home team for this game.

=== Louisville Cardinals ===
The Cardinals clinched a spot in the game following their defeat of Miami on November 18. They finished the regular season 10–2 (7–1 ACC), with losses to Pitt, and to Kentucky. They are the designated away team for the championship game.

== Scoring summary ==
2023 ACC Championship Game
No. 14 Louisville Cardinals (10–2, 7–1) vs. No. 4 Florida State Seminoles (12–0, 8–0)

| Quarter | 1 | 2 | 3 | 4 | Total |
|---|---|---|---|---|---|
| No. 14 Louisville | 0 | 0 | 3 | 3 | 6 |
| No. 4 Florida State | 0 | 3 | 7 | 6 | 16 |

at Bank of America Stadium • Charlotte, NC

- Date: Saturday, December 2, 2023
- Game time: 8:14 p.m. EST
- Game weather: 65 °F (18 °C) • Wind: SE @ 8 mph (13 km/h) • Weather: Cloudy
- Game attendance: 62,314
- Referee: Mike Roche
- TV announcers (ABC): Joe Tessitore, Jesse Palmer, Katie George

Game information
First quarter
- No Scoring

Second quarter

- (10:32) Florida State – Ryan Fitzgerald 45 yard field goal, (Drive: 11 plays, 50 yards, 5:01; Florida State 3–0)

Third quarter

- (7:02) Louisville – Brock Travelstead 36 yard field goal, (Drive: 13 plays, 56 yards, 6:20; Tied 3–3)
- (6:20) Florida State – Lawrance Toafili 2 yard rush, Fitzgerald kick, (Drive: 2 plays, 75 yards, 0:42; Florida State 10–3)

Fourth quarter

- (13:36) Louisville – Travelstead 33 yard field goal, (Drive: 8 plays, 43 yards, 3:10; Florida State 10–6)
- (3:13) Florida State – Fitzgerald 33 yard field goal, (Drive: 6 plays, 34 yards, 2:52; Florida State 13–6)
- (2:19) Florida State – Fitzgerald 40 yard field goal, (Drive: 4 plays, -2 yards, 0:16; Florida State 16–6)

| Statistics | LOU | FSU |
|---|---|---|
| First downs | 10 | 12 |
| Plays–yards | 70–188 | 65–219 |
| Rushes–yards | 34–77 | 44–164 |
| Passing yards | 111 | 55 |
| Passing: comp–att–int | 14–36–1 | 8–21–0 |
| Time of possession | 28:32 | 31:28 |

| Team | Category | Player | Statistics |
|---|---|---|---|
| Louisville | Passing | Jack Plummer | 14/36, 111 yards, 1 INT |
| Louisville | Rushing | Jawhar Jordan | 14 carries, 52 yards |
| Louisville | Receiving | Jamari Thrash | 7 receptions, 52 yards |
| Florida State | Passing | Brock Glenn | 8/21, 55 yards |
| Florida State | Rushing | Lawrance Toafili | 10 carries, 118 yards, 1 TD |
| Florida State | Receiving | Johnny Wilson | 2 receptions, 21 yards |
