= 2023 Pittsburgh Panthers football team =

American college football season

2023 Pittsburgh Panthers football
- Conference: Atlantic Coast Conference
- Record: 3–9 (2–6 ACC)
- Head coach: Pat Narduzzi (9th season)
- Offensive coordinator: Frank Cignetti Jr. (2nd season)
- Offensive scheme: Pro-style
- Defensive coordinator: Randy Bates (6th season)
- Base defense: 4–3
- Home stadium: Acrisure Stadium

Uniform
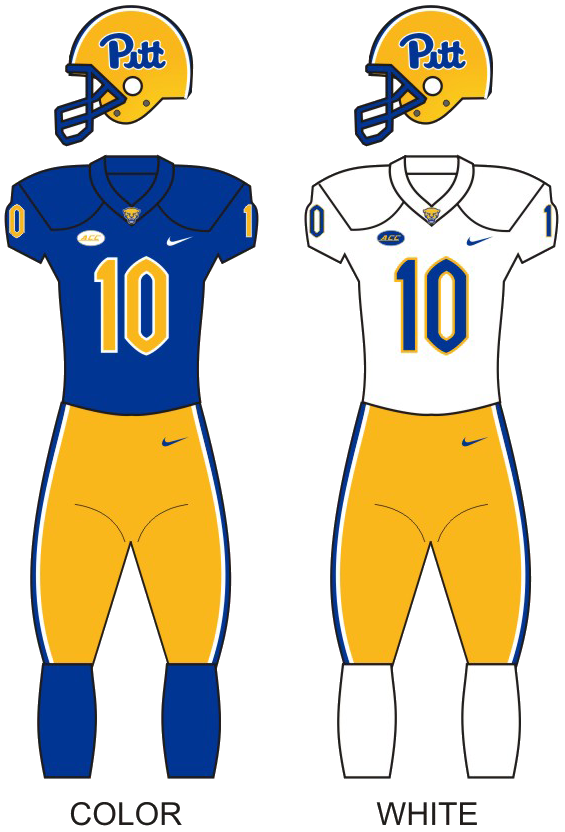

2023 Atlantic Coast Conference football standings
	Conf.			Overall
Team	W		L	W		L
No. 6 Florida State y$	8	–	0	13	–	1
No. 19 Louisville y	7	–	1	10	–	4
No. 21 NC State	6	–	2	9	–	4
Georgia Tech	5	–	3	7	–	6
Virginia Tech	5	–	3	7	–	6
No. 20 Clemson	4	–	4	9	–	4
Duke	4	–	4	8	–	5
North Carolina	4	–	4	8	–	5
Boston College	3	–	5	7	–	6
Miami (FL)	3	–	5	7	–	6
Syracuse	2	–	6	6	–	7
Pittsburgh	2	–	6	3	–	9
Virginia	2	–	6	3	–	9
Wake Forest	1	–	7	4	–	8
Championship: Florida State 16, Louisville 6
$ – Conference champion; y – Championship game participant; Rankings from AP Poll

The 2023 Pittsburgh Panthers football team represented the University of Pittsburgh as a member of the Atlantic Coast Conference (ACC) during the 2023 NCAA Division I FBS football season. The Panthers were led by ninth-year head coach Pat Narduzzi and played their home games at Acrisure Stadium in Pittsburgh. The Pittsburgh Panthers football team drew an average home attendance of 48,122 in 2023.

This was Pitt's eleventh season as a member of the ACC. Just two years removed from an ACC Championship, Pitt finished With a record of 3–9, their worst record since 1998.

== Transfers ==
=== Outgoing ===
Name	Pos.	New school
Ak’Bar Shabazz II	CB	West Virginia
Judson Tallandier	CB	Akron
Jaden Bradley	WR	Charlotte
Jaylon Barden	WR	Georgia Southern
Samuel Willams	EDGE	Murray State
Khalil Anderson	CB	East Tennessee State
Isaiah Stewart	WR	None
Kedon Slovis	QB	BYU
Kyi Wright	TE	James Madison
John Morgan	EDGE	Arkansas
Vincent Davis	RB	UNLV
Gavin Thomson	WR	UNLV
Myles Alston	WR	Old Dominion
Sam Vander Haar	P	None

=== Incoming ===
Name	Pos.	Previous school
Phil Jurkovec	QB	Boston College
Derrick Davis Jr.	RB	LSU
Donovan McMillon	S	Florida
Daejon Reynolds	WR	Florida
Jackson Brown	OT	California
Christian Veilleux	QB	Penn State
Jeff Yurk	P	Elon
Malcolm Epps	TE	USC

== Schedule ==
Pittsburgh and the ACC announced the 2023 football schedule on January 30, 2023. The 2023 season was the conference's first season since 2004 that its scheduling format included just one division. The new format set Pittsburgh with three set conference opponents, while playing the remaining ten teams twice in a four–year cycle. The Panthers' three set conference opponents for the next four years are Boston College, Syracuse, and Virginia Tech.

Date	Time	Opponent	Site	TV	Result	Attendance
September 2	3:30 p.m.	Wofford*	Acrisure Stadium; Pittsburgh, PA	ACCN	W 45–7	45,096
September 9	6:30 p.m.	Cincinnati*	Acrisure Stadium; Pittsburgh, PA (River City Rivalry)	The CW	L 21–27	49,398
September 16	7:30 p.m.	at West Virginia*	Mountaineer Field; Morgantown, WV (Backyard Brawl)	ABC	L 6–17	61,106
September 23	8:00 p.m.	No. 17 North Carolina	Acrisure Stadium; Pittsburgh, PA	ACCN	L 24–41	48,544
September 30	8:00 p.m.	at Virginia Tech	Lane Stadium; Blacksburg, VA	ACCN	L 21–38	65,632
October 14	6:30 p.m.	No. 14 Louisville^{†}	Acrisure Stadium; Pittsburgh, PA	The CW	W 38–21	46,296
October 21	3:30 p.m.	at Wake Forest	Allegacy Federal Credit Union Stadium; Winston-Salem, NC	ACCN	L 17–21	31,855
October 28	3:30 p.m.	at No. 14 Notre Dame*	Notre Dame Stadium; Notre Dame, IN (rivalry)	NBC	L 7–58	77,622
November 4	3:30 p.m.	No. 4 Florida State	Acrisure Stadium; Pittsburgh, PA	ESPN	L 7–24	57,557
November 11	3:30 p.m.	vs. Syracuse	Yankee Stadium; Bronx, NY (rivalry)	ACCN	L 13–28	17,101
November 16	7:00 p.m.	Boston College	Acrisure Stadium; Pittsburgh, PA	ESPN	W 24–16	41,842
November 25	12:00 p.m.	at Duke	Wallace Wade Stadium; Durham, NC	ACCN	L 19–30	17,639
*Non-conference game; ^{†}Homecoming; Rankings from AP Poll (and CFP Rankings, after November 2) - Released prior to game; All times are in Eastern time

== Rankings ==
Ranking movements Legend: ██ Increase in ranking ██ Decrease in ranking — = Not ranked RV = Received votes
	Week															
Poll	Pre	1	2	3	4	5	6	7	8	9	10	11	12	13	14	Final
AP	RV	RV	—	—	—	—	—	—	—	—	—	—	—	—	—	—
Coaches	RV	RV	—	—	—	—	—	—	—	—	—	—	—	—	—	—
CFP	Not released									—	—	—	—	—	—	Not released

== Players drafted into the NFL ==
Round	Pick	Player	Position	NFL Club
3	79	Matt Goncalves	OT	Indianapolis Colts
5	170	Bub Means	WR	New Orleans Saints
7	229	M. J. Devonshire	DB	Las Vegas Raiders
