= Jack Plummer =

American football player (born 1999)

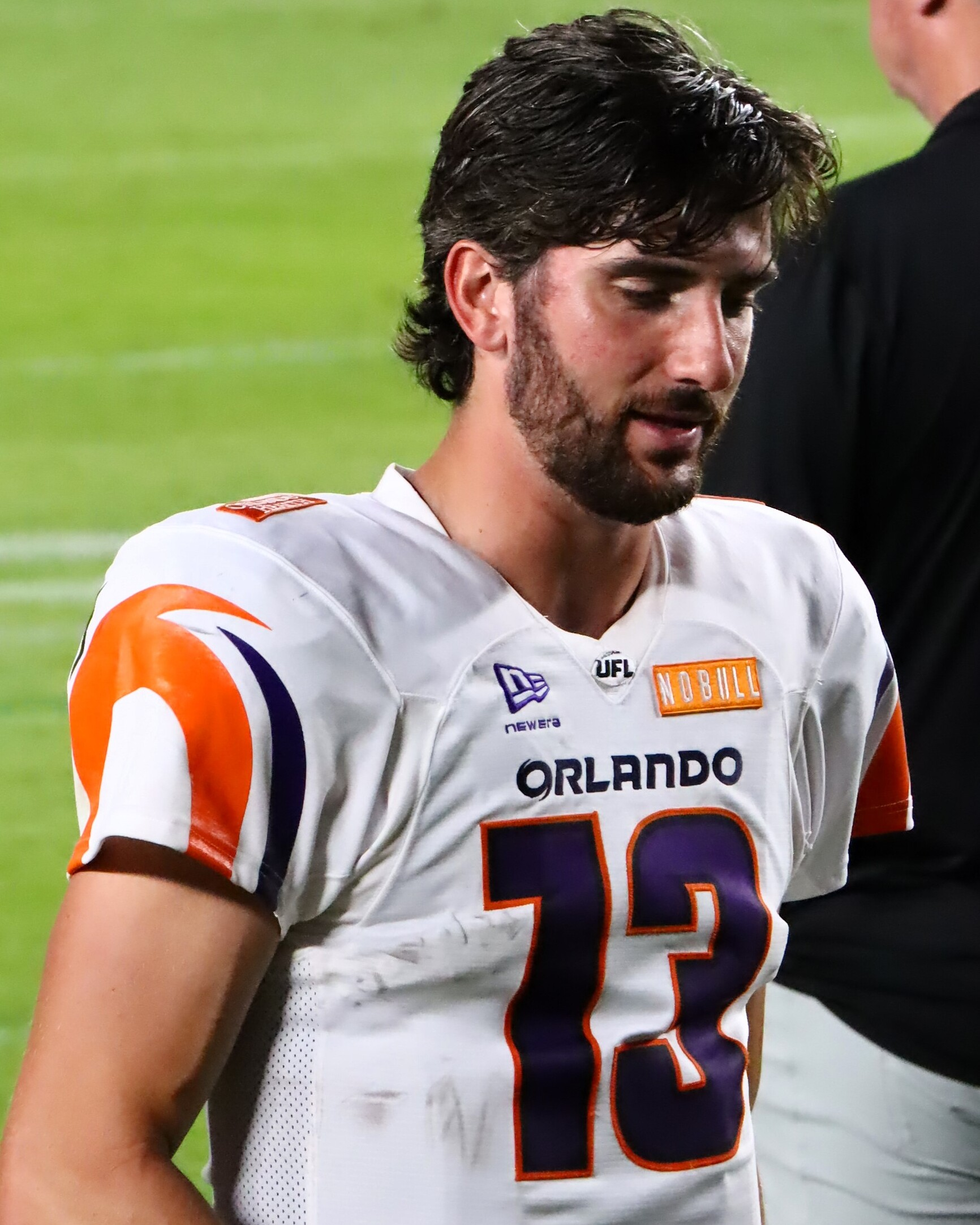
- Plummer with the Orlando Storm in 2026

No. 13 – Orlando Storm
- Position: Quarterback
- Roster status: Active

Personal information
- Born: October 21, 1999 (age 27); Dubuque, Iowa, U.S.
- Listed height: 6 ft 5 in (1.96 m)
- Listed weight: 215 lb (98 kg)

Career information
- High school: Gilbert (Gilbert, Arizona)
- College: Purdue (2018–2021); California (2022); Louisville (2023)
- NFL draft: 2024: undrafted

Career history
- Carolina Panthers (2024); Orlando Storm (2026–present)

Awards and highlights
- UFL Most Valuable Player (2026); All-UFL Team (2026); UFL passing yards leader (2026); Third-team All-ACC (2023)
- Stats at Pro Football Reference

Jack Plummer (born October 21, 1999) is an American professional football quarterback for the Orlando Storm of the United Football League (UFL). He played college football for the Purdue Boilermakers, California Golden Bears, and Louisville Cardinals before signing with the Carolina Panthers as an undrafted free agent in 2024.

== Early life ==
Plummer was born on October 21, 1999, in Dubuque, Iowa. He played high school football while attending Gilbert High School in Arizona, where he completed 515 of 888 passes for 6,913 yards and 69 touchdowns to 25 interceptions. He also added 572 yards and nine touchdowns on the ground while also bringing in one reception for 13 yards. Plummer was named an honorable mention All-USA Arizona High School Team in the 2017 season. Plummer committed to play college football at Purdue University over other schools such as Arizona, South Carolina and Oregon State.

== College career ==
College recruiting (2018)
Name	Hometown	School	Height	Weight	Commit date
Jack Plummer; QB	Gilbert, Arizona	Gilbert High School	6 ft 5 in (1.96 m)	212 lb (96 kg)	Jun 8, 2017
Jack Plummer; QB	Recruit ratings: Scout: Rivals: 247Sports: ESPN:				

=== Purdue ===
Plummer made his first collegiate start at quarterback on September 14, 2019, against TCU, completing 13 of 19 passes for 181 yards, a touchdown and two interceptions in a loss. Plummer appeared in seven games on the season, completing 144 out of 241 passes for 1,603 yards, 11 touchdowns and eight interceptions, while also rushing for 62 yards. In 2020, Plummer started in the final three games of the season where he would go 88 out of 124 on his passing attempts for 988 yards and eight touchdowns to two interceptions, while rushing for 16 yards and a touchdown. Plummer opened the 2021 season as Purdue's starting quarterback in a week one matchup against Oregon State. However, he was benched four games into the season in favor of Aidan O'Connell. On the season, Plummer completed 87 of 127 passes for 864 yards and seven touchdowns with no interceptions, while adding 27 rushing yards. He entered the transfer portal in November.

=== California ===
Plummer transferred to California. He was named the starter ahead of their season opener against UC Davis, completing 23 of 35 passes for 268 yards and three touchdowns in a 34–13 win. In the Golden Bears' last game of the season, Plummer had a career game, throwing for 294 yards and four touchdowns in a narrow loss to the 9–3, #18 UCLA Bruins. Plummer finished the 2022 season going 282 for 451 for a career best 3,095 yards and 21 touchdowns, while only throwing eight interceptions. Plummer also added a rushing touchdown. After one season with the Golden Bears, Plummer entered his name in the transfer portal.

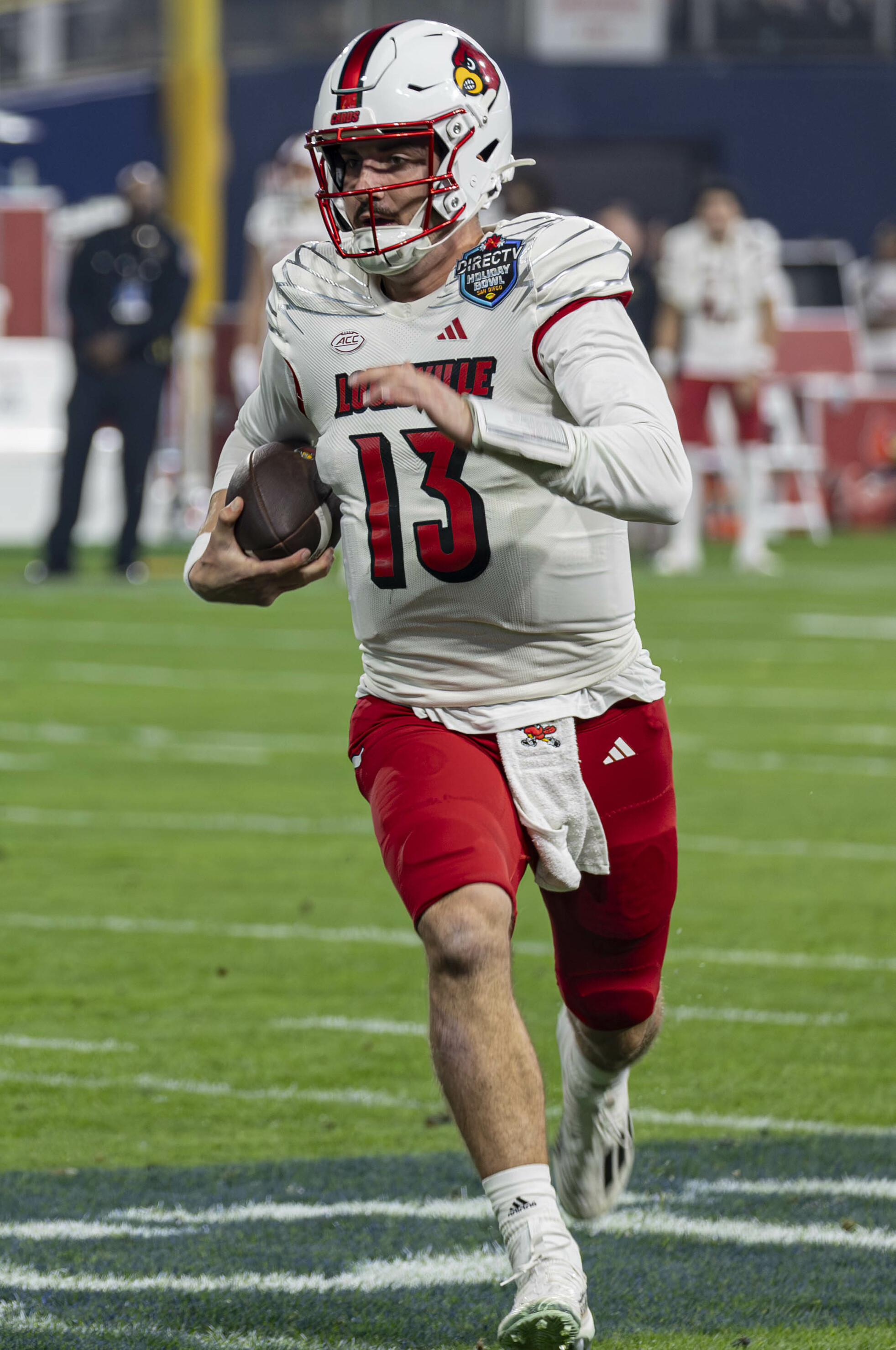
Plummer at the 2023 Holiday Bowl

=== Louisville ===
Plummer transferred to Louisville for his final year of eligibility. Named Louisville's starting quarterback, he led Louisville to a 10–2 record and an appearance in the 2023 ACC Championship Game.

=== College statistics ===
Season	Team	Games			Passing								Rushing			
Season	Team	GP	GS	Record	Cmp	Att	Pct	Yds	Avg	TD	Int	Rtg	Att	Yds	Avg	TD
2018	Purdue	Redshirted														
2019	Purdue	9	6	2−4	144	241	59.8	1,603	6.7	11	8	124.0	62	56	0.9	0
2020	Purdue	3	3	0−3	88	124	71.0	938	7.6	8	2	152.6	16	21	1.3	1
2021	Purdue	9	4	3−1	87	127	68.5	864	6.8	7	0	143.8	27	-3	-0.1	0
2022	California	12	12	4−8	282	451	62.5	3,119	6.9	21	9	132.0	52	-126	-2.4	1
2023	Louisville	14	14	10−4	256	395	64.8	3,204	8.1	21	12	144.4	98	34	0.3	1
Career		47	39	19−20	857	1,338	64.1	9,728	7.3	68	31	137.3	255	-18	-0.1	3

== Professional career ==
Pre-draft measurables
Height	Weight	Arm length	Hand span	Wingspan	40-yard dash	10-yard split	20-yard split	20-yard shuttle	Three-cone drill	Vertical jump	Broad jump
6 ft 4 3/8 in (1.94 m)	215 lb (98 kg)	32 5/8 in (0.83 m)	9 1/2 in (0.24 m)	6 ft 6 3/8 in (1.99 m)	4.79 s	1.68 s	2.78 s	4.40 s	7.06 s	33 in (0.84 m)	9 ft 8 in (2.95 m)
All values from Pro Day

=== Carolina Panthers ===
Plummer signed as a undrafted free agent with the Carolina Panthers after going undrafted in the 2024 NFL draft. He was waived on August 27, and re-signed to the practice squad. Plummer was promoted to the active roster on December 28.

On August 25, 2025, Plummer was waived by the Panthers.

=== Orlando Storm ===
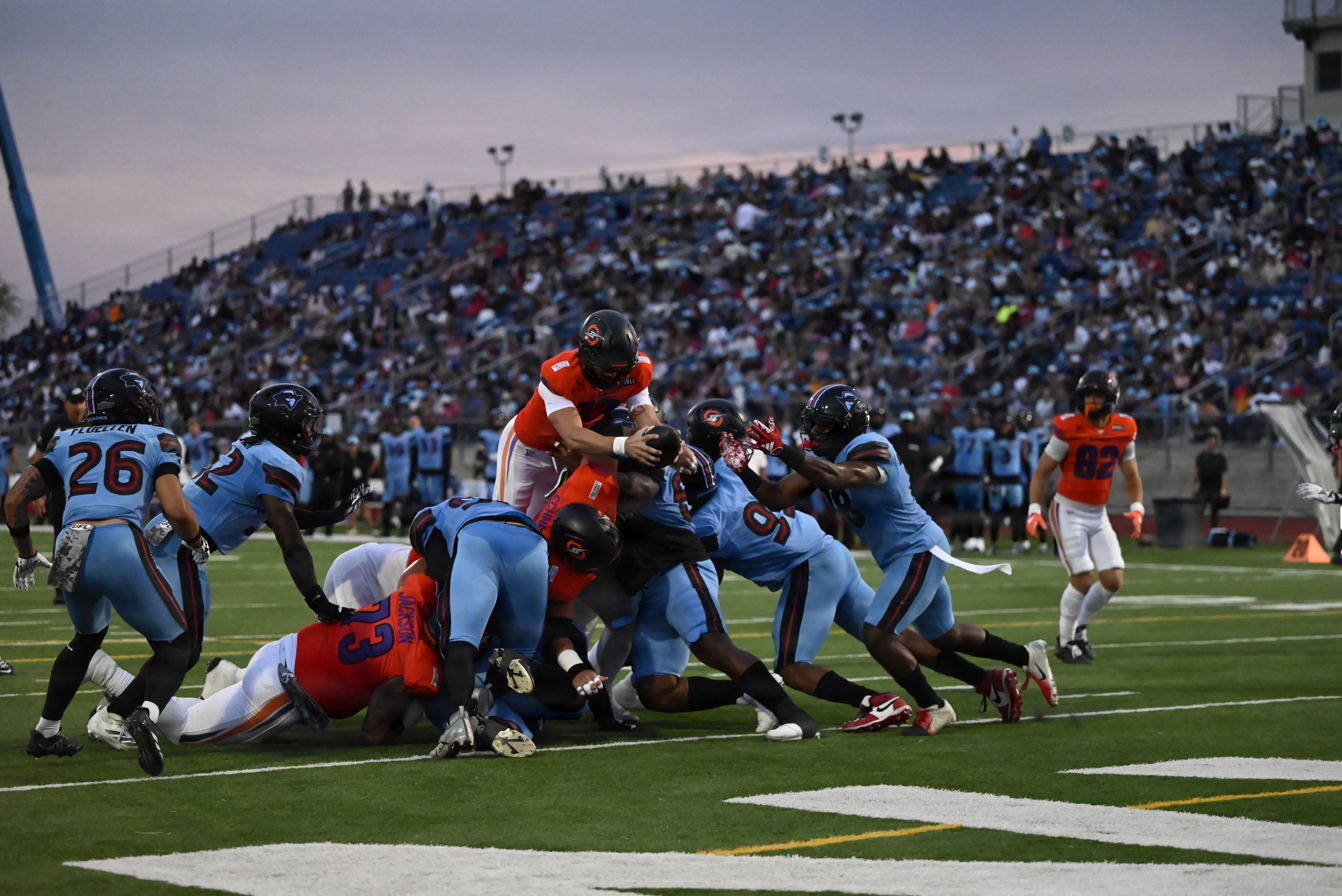
Plummer dives for the touchdown against the Dallas Renegades in 2026

On January 12, 2026, Plummer was allocated to the Orlando Storm of the United Football League (UFL).

Plummer led the league in passing yards with 2,188 to go with 17 touchdown passes, the second most in the UFL, and just one interception. He was named UFL MVP and to the 2026 All-UFL team.

== UFL career statistics ==
Legend
	UFL MVP
	Led the league
**Bold**	Career high

=== Regular season ===
Season	Team	Games			Passing								Rushing			
Season	Team	GP	GS	Record	Cmp	Att	Pct	Yds	Y/A	TD	Int	Rtg	Att	Yds	Avg	TD
2026	ORL	10	10	8–2	195	300	65.0	2,189	7.3	17	1	104.2	30	189	6.3	2
Career		10	10	8–2	195	300	65.0	2,189	7.3	17	1	104.2	30	189	6.3	2

=== Postseason ===
Season	Team	Games			Passing								Rushing			
Season	Team	GP	GS	Record	Cmp	Att	Pct	Yds	Y/A	TD	Int	Rtg	Att	Yds	Avg	TD
2026	ORL	1	1	0–1	15	28	65.0	226	8.1	1	1	77.4	2	15	7.5	0
Career		1	1	0–1	15	28	65.0	226	8.1	1	1	77.4	2	15	7.5	0

== Personal life ==
Plummer is the brother of former Arizona Wildcats quarterback Will Plummer. Despite their surname and position along with their ties to the state of Arizona, he is not related to former NFL quarterback Jake Plummer; Jack remarked in 2024 that Jake is often mistaken for his father, especially when Jack was assigned No. 16 (the number Jake wore during his career) with the Panthers.
