= UFL Most Valuable Player =

UFL MVP list

UFL Most Valuable Player Award
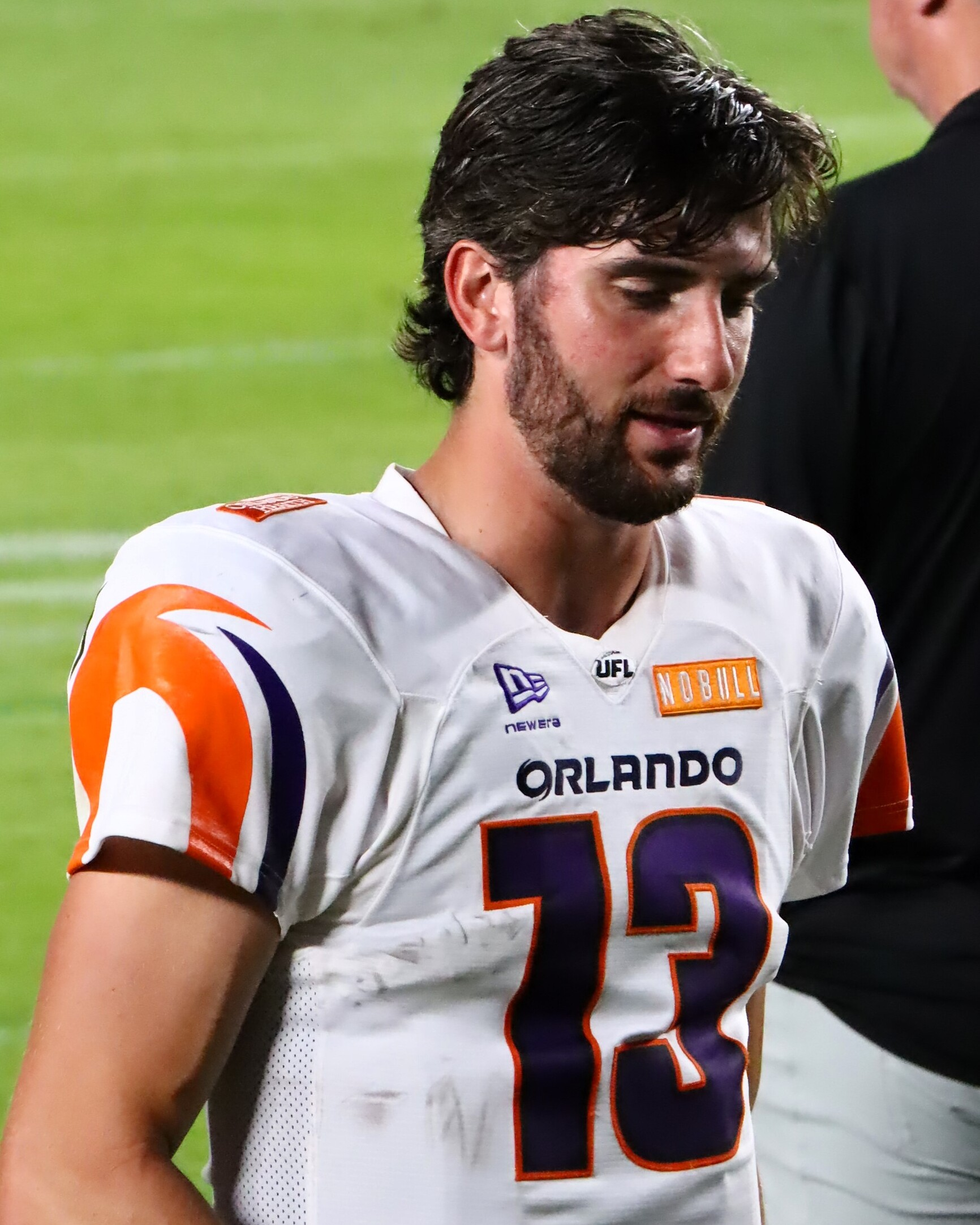
- Jack Plummer is the 2026 UFL MVP
- Sport: American football
- League: United Football League
- Awarded for: Best performing player in regular season of the United Football League

History
- First award: 2024
- Most recent: Jack Plummer, Orlando Storm (2026)

The United Football League Most Valuable Player Award (MVP) is an annual award given by the United Football League (UFL) to the best performing player of the regular season. The inaugural recipient of the award was Adrian Martinez of the Birmingham Stallions.

== Winners ==
Season	Player	Position	Nationality	Team	Finalists	Ref
2024	Adrian Martinez	Quarterback	United States	Birmingham Stallions	Hakeem Butler, Tavante Beckett, Carlos Davis, Luis Perez, Breeland Speaks	
2025	Bryce Perkins	Quarterback	United States	Michigan Panthers		
2026	Jack Plummer	Quarterback	United States	Orlando Storm	Cam Gill, Derick Roberson, Jordan Ta'amu	

== Teams ==
1	Birmingham Stallions	2024
1	Michigan Panthers	2025
1	Orlando Storm	2026
0	Columbus Aviators	N/A
0	Dallas Renegades	N/A
0	DC Defenders	N/A
0	Houston Gamblers	N/A
0	Louisville Kings	N/A
0	Memphis Showboats	N/A
0	San Antonio Brahmas	N/A
0	St. Louis Battlehawks	N/A
