= 2023 Wake Forest Demon Deacons football team =

American college football season

2023 Wake Forest Demon Deacons football
- Conference: Atlantic Coast Conference
- Record: 4–8 (1–7 ACC)
- Head coach: Dave Clawson (10th season)
- Offensive coordinator: Warren Ruggiero (10th season)
- Offensive scheme: Slow mesh
- Defensive coordinator: Brad Lambert (5th season)
- Base defense: Multiple 4–2–5
- Home stadium: Allegacy Federal Credit Union Stadium

2023 Atlantic Coast Conference football standings
| | Conf. | | | Overall |
| Team | W | | L | W | | L |
|---|---|---|---|---|---|---|
| No. 6 Florida State y$ | 8 | – | 0 | 13 | – | 1 |
| No. 19 Louisville y | 7 | – | 1 | 10 | – | 4 |
| No. 21 NC State | 6 | – | 2 | 9 | – | 4 |
| Georgia Tech | 5 | – | 3 | 7 | – | 6 |
| Virginia Tech | 5 | – | 3 | 7 | – | 6 |
| No. 20 Clemson | 4 | – | 4 | 9 | – | 4 |
| Duke | 4 | – | 4 | 8 | – | 5 |
| North Carolina | 4 | – | 4 | 8 | – | 5 |
| Boston College | 3 | – | 5 | 7 | – | 6 |
| Miami (FL) | 3 | – | 5 | 7 | – | 6 |
| Syracuse | 2 | – | 6 | 6 | – | 7 |
| Pittsburgh | 2 | – | 6 | 3 | – | 9 |
| Virginia | 2 | – | 6 | 3 | – | 9 |
| Wake Forest | 1 | – | 7 | 4 | – | 8 |
Championship: Florida State 16, Louisville 6
$ – Conference champion; y – Championship game participant; Rankings from AP Poll

The 2023 Wake Forest Demon Deacons football team represented Wake Forest University as a member of the Atlantic Coast Conference (ACC) during the 2023 NCAA Division I FBS football season. The Demon Deacons were led by Dave Clawson in his tenth year as head coach. They played their home games at Allegacy Federal Credit Union Stadium in Winston-Salem, North Carolina. The Wake Forest Demon Deacons football team drew an average home attendance of 30,609 in 2023.

== Offseason ==
=== Players drafted into the NFL ===
| Player | Position | Team | Round | Pick |
|---|---|---|---|---|
| Kobie Turner | DE | Los Angeles Rams | 3 | 89 |
| A. T. Perry | WR | New Orleans Saints | 6 | 195 |

=== Transfers ===
==== Outgoing ====
| Player | Position | Destination |
|---|---|---|
| Jackson Hensley | WR | Eastern Kentucky |
| Christian Turner | RB | Indiana |
| Zavier Simpson | WR | Ball State |
| Brett Griffis | QB | James Madison |
| J.J. Roberts | CB | Marshall |
| Gavin Holmes | CB | Texas |
| Quinton Cooley | RB | Liberty |
| Rondell Bothroyd | DL | Oklahoma |
| Dez Williams | WR | Stony Brook |
| Sam Hartman | QB | Notre Dame |
| Bernard Gooden | DL | South Florida |

==== Incoming ====
| Player | Position | Previous school |
|---|---|---|
| Bryce Ganious | DL | Villanova |
| Walker Merrill | WR | Tennessee |
| Jacob Roberts | ILB | North Carolina A&T |

== Schedule ==
Wake Forest and the ACC announced the 2023 football schedule on January 30, 2023. The 2023 season will be the conference's first season since 2004, that its scheduling format just includes one division. The new format sets Wake Forest with three set conference opponents, while playing the remaining ten teams twice (home and away) in a four–year cycle. The Demon Deacons three set conference opponents for the next four years is; Duke, Georgia Tech, and Virginia Tech.

| Date | Time | Opponent | Site | TV | Result | Attendance |
|---|---|---|---|---|---|---|
| August 31 | 7:00 p.m. | Elon* | Allegacy Federal Credit Union Stadium; Winston-Salem, NC | ACCN | W 37–17 | 30,028 |
| September 9 | 11:00 a.m. | Vanderbilt* | Allegacy Federal Credit Union Stadium; Winston-Salem, NC | ACCN | W 36–20 | 28,363 |
| September 16 | 12:00 p.m. | at Old Dominion* | S.B. Ballard Stadium; Norfolk, VA | ESPN2 | W 27–24 | 18,276 |
| September 23 | 6:30 p.m. | Georgia Tech | Allegacy Federal Credit Union Stadium; Winston-Salem, NC | The CW | L 16–30 | 32,528 |
| October 7 | 3:30 p.m. | at Clemson | Memorial Stadium; Clemson, SC | ACCN | L 12–17 | 80,810 |
| October 14 | 3:30 p.m. | at Virginia Tech | Lane Stadium; Blacksburg, VA | ACCN | L 13–30 | 65,632 |
| October 21 | 3:30 p.m. | Pittsburgh^{†} | Allegacy Federal Credit Union Stadium; Winston-Salem, NC | ACCN | W 21–17 | 31,855 |
| October 28 | 12:00 p.m. | No. 4 Florida State | Allegacy Federal Credit Union Stadium; Winston-Salem, NC | ABC | L 16–41 | 31,288 |
| November 2 | 7:30 p.m. | at Duke | Wallace Wade Stadium; Durham, NC (rivalry) | ESPN | L 21–24 | 18,277 |
| November 11 | 2:00 p.m. | NC State | Allegacy Federal Credit Union Stadium; Winston-Salem, NC (rivalry) | The CW | L 6–26 | 29,591 |
| November 18 | 3:30 p.m. | at No. 19 Notre Dame* | Notre Dame Stadium; Notre Dame, IN | NBC | L 7–45 | 77,622 |
| November 25 | 2:00 p.m. | at Syracuse | JMA Wireless Dome; Syracuse, NY | The CW | L 31–35 | 35,018 |
*Non-conference game; ^{†}Homecoming; Rankings from AP Poll (and CFP Rankings, after November 2) - Released prior to game; All times are in Eastern time

== Game summaries ==
=== Elon ===
Elon Phoenix at Wake Forest Demon Deacons

| Quarter | 1 | 2 | 3 | 4 | Total |
|---|---|---|---|---|---|
| Phoenix | 0 | 0 | 14 | 3 | 17 |
| Demon Deacons | 10 | 14 | 6 | 7 | 37 |

at Truist Field, Winston-Salem, NC

- Date: August 31, 2023
- Game time: 7:00 p.m. EST
- Game attendance: 30,028
- TV announcers (ACCN): Drew Carter (play-by-play) and Dustin Fox (analyst)

Game information

First Quarter
Second Quarter
Third Quarter
Fourth Quarter

| Statistics | ELON | WAKE |
|---|---|---|
| First downs | 13 | 22 |
| Total yards | 251 | 427 |
| Rushing yards | 104 | 98 |
| Passing yards | 149 | 327 |
| Turnovers | 2 | 1 |
| Time of possession | 31:50 | 28:10 |

| Team | Category | Player | Statistics |
|---|---|---|---|
| Elon | Passing | Justin Allen | 18/29, 130 yards, 2 INT |
| Elon | Rushing | Jalen Hampton | 15 carries, 89 yards, 1 TD |
| Elon | Receiving | Jordan Bonner | 7 catches, 58 yards |
| Wake Forest | Passing | Mitch Griffis | 19/30, 329, 3 TD, 1 INT |
| Wake Forest | Rushing | Demond Claiborne | 13 carries, 70 yards, 1 TD |
| Wake Forest | Receiving | Jahmal Banks | 6 catches, 108 yards, 1 TD |

=== Vanderbilt ===
Game Two – Vanderbilt Commodores (2–0) at Wake Forest Demon Deacons (1–0) – Game summary

| Quarter | 1 | 2 | 3 | 4 | Total |
|---|---|---|---|---|---|
| Vanderbilt | 0 | 14 | 0 | 6 | 20 |
| Wake Forest | 3 | 21 | 3 | 9 | 36 |

at Truist Field, Winston-Salem, NC

- Date: September 9, 2023
- Game time: 11:00 a.m. EST
- Game attendance: 28,363
- Referee: Lee Hendrick
- TV announcers (ACCN): Courtney Lyle (play-by-play), Hutson Mason (analyst), Lericia Harris (sideline)

Game information

First quarter

- (12:50) WAKE – Matthew Dennis 25-yard field goal (Drive: 4 plays, 4 yards, 0:40; Wake Forest 3–0)

Second quarter

- (12:55) WAKE – Jahmal Banks 7-yard pass from Mitch Griffis (Matthew Dennis kick) (Drive: 9 plays, 80 yards, 3:10; Wake Forest 10–0)
- (10:03) VAN – Will Sheppard 11-yard pass from AJ Swann (Jacob Borcila kick) (Drive: 5 plays, 75 yards, 2:46; Wake Forest 10–7)
- (3:22) WAKE – Tate Carney 1-yard run (Matthew Dennis kick) (Drive: 14 plays, 75 yards, 6:41; Wake Forest 17–7)
- (1:42) VAN – Will Sheppard 10-yard pass from AJ Swann (Jacob Borcila kick) (Drive: 4 plays, 75 yards, 1:40; Wake Forest 17–14)
- (0:50) WAKE – Brendon Harris 31-yard fumble return (Matthew Dennis kick) (Wake Forest 24–14)

Third quarter

- (12:36) WAKE – Matthew Dennis 44-yard field goal (Drive: 8 plays, 55 yards, 2:18; Wake Forest 27–14)

Fourth quarter

- (11:39) WAKE – Ke'Shawn Williams 24-yard pass from Mitch Griffis (pass failed) (Drive: 7 plays, 50 yards, 3:15; Wake Forest 33–14)
- (9:08) VAN – London Humphreys 30-yard pass from AJ Swann (pass failed) (Drive: 7 plays, 75 yards, 2:31; Wake Forest 33–20)
- (2:24) WAKE – Matthew Dennis 20-yard field goal (Drive: 11 plays, 73 yards, 6:44; Wake Forest 36–20)

| Statistics | VAN | WAKE |
|---|---|---|
| First downs | 21 | 29 |
| Total yards | 423 | 484 |
| Rushing yards | 109 | 288 |
| Passing yards | 314 | 196 |
| Turnovers | 3 | 1 |
| Time of possession | 25:43 | 34:17 |

| Team | Category | Player | Statistics |
|---|---|---|---|
| Vanderbilt | Passing | AJ Swann | 26/39, 314 yards, 3 TD, 2 INT |
| Vanderbilt | Rushing | Patrick Smith | 10 carries, 77 yards |
| Vanderbilt | Receiving | London Humphreys | 4 receptions, 109 yards, TD |
| Wake Forest | Passing | Mitch Griffis | 17/26, 196 yards, 2 TD |
| Wake Forest | Rushing | Demond Claiborne | 26 carries, 165 yards |
| Wake Forest | Receiving | Ke'Shawn Williams | 5 receptions, 92 yards, TD |

=== at Clemson ===
Wake Forest Demon Deacons at Clemson Tigers − Game summary

| Quarter | 1 | 2 | 3 | 4 | Total |
|---|---|---|---|---|---|
| Wake Forest | 3 | 0 | 3 | 6 | 12 |
| Clemson | 0 | 7 | 3 | 7 | 17 |

at Memorial Stadium • Clemson, SC

- Date: October 7, 2023
- Game time: 3:30 p.m.
- Game weather: Temperature: 74 °F (23 °C) • Wind: NW @ 10 mph (16 km/h) • Weather: Sunny
- Game attendance: 80,810
- Referee: Jerry Magallanes
- TV announcers (ACCN): Chris Cotter (play-by-play), Mark Herzlich (color), Sherree Burruss (sideline)

Game information
First quarter
- (2:25) Wake Forest – Matthew Dennis 35 yard field goal, (Drive: 7 plays, 28 yards, 3:15; Wake Forest 3–0)

Second quarter

- (10:18) Clemson – Cade Klubnik 7 yard rush, Jonathan Weitz kick, (Drive: 16 plays, 75 yards, 7:07; Clemson 7–3)

Third quarter

- (7:15) Clemson – Weitz 25 yard field goal, (Drive: 15 plays, 67 yards, 7:45; Clemson 10–3)
- (2:20) Wake Forest – Dennis 22 yard field goal, (Drive: 12 plays, 71 yards, 4:55; Clemson 10–6)

Fourth quarter

- (5:49) Clemson – Will Shipley 1 yard rush, Weitz kick, (Drive: 8 plays, 61 yards, 3:45; Clemson 17–6)
- (1:34) Wake Forest – Demond Claiborne 3 yard rush, 2 point attempt failed (Drive: 11 plays, 75 yards, 4:15; Clemson 17–12)

| Statistics | WAKE | CLEM |
|---|---|---|
| First downs | 18 | 19 |
| Total yards | 239 | 338 |
| Rushing yards | 102 | 207 |
| Passing yards | 137 | 131 |
| Turnovers | 1 | 2 |
| Time of possession | 28:39 | 31:21 |

| Team | Category | Player | Statistics |
|---|---|---|---|
| Wake Forest | Passing | Mitch Griffis | 15/25, 137 yards |
| Wake Forest | Rushing | Demond Claiborne | 19 rushes, 60 yards, 1 TD |
| Wake Forest | Receiving | Jahmal Banks | 8 receptions, 55 yards |
| Clemson | Passing | Cade Klubnik | 18/28, 131 yards |
| Clemson | Rushing | Will Shipley | 19 rushes, 97 yards, 1 TD |
| Clemson | Receiving | Beaux Collins | 5 receptions, 50 yards |

=== at Virginia Tech ===
Wake Forest Demon Deacons (3-2) at Virginia Tech Hokies − Game summary

| Quarter | 1 | 2 | 3 | 4 | Total |
|---|---|---|---|---|---|
| Wake Forest | 0 | 10 | 0 | 3 | 13 |
| Virginia Tech | 0 | 17 | 3 | 10 | 30 |

at Lane Stadium • Blacksburg, VA

- Date: October 14, 2023
- Game time: 3:30 p.m. EDT
- Game weather: sunny • Temperature: 66 °F (19 °C)
- Game attendance: 65,632
- Referee: Stuart Mullins
- TV: ACCN

Game information

Second Quarter

- (10:42) VT – Bhayshul Tuten 3 yd Rush (John Love Kick) (Drive: 4 plays, 51 yards, 1:48; VT 7–0)
- (4:23) VT - John Love 37 yd Field Goal (Drive: 9 plays, 55 yards, 4:31; VT 10-0)
- (4:10) WF - Demond Claiborne 96 yd Kickoff Return (Matthew Dennis Kick) (VT 10-7)
- (3:59) VT - Jaylin Lane 75 yd Pass From Kyron Drones (John Love Kick) (Drive: 1 play, 75 yards, 0:11; VT 17-7)
- (0:20) WF - Matthew Dennis 28 yd Field Goal (Drive: 10 plays, 55 yards, 3:39; VT 17-10)

Third Quarter

- (0:49) VT - John Love 26 yd Field Goal (Drive: 13 plays, 45 yards, 6:26; VT 20-10)

Fourth Quarter

- (12:37) WF – Matthew Dennis 34 yd Field Goal (Drive: 8 plays, 60 yards, 3:12; VT 20–13)
- (8:06) VT - John Love 36 yd Field Goal (Drive: 8 plays, 56 yards, 4:31; VT 23-13)
- (2:47) VT - Jaylin Lane 12 yd Pass From Kyron Drones (John Love Kick) (Drive: 7 plays, 53 yards, 3:07; VT 30-13)

| Statistics | WF | VT |
|---|---|---|
| First downs | 20 | 21 |
| Total yards | 262 | 462 |
| Rush yards | 35 | 141 |
| Passing yards | 227 | 321 |
| Turnovers | 3 | 1 |
| Time of possession | 27:08 | 32:52 |

| Team | Category | Player | Statistics |
|---|---|---|---|
| Wake Forest | Passing | Michael Kern | 14/22, 166 yards |
| Wake Forest | Rushing | Justice Ellison | 11 carries, 35 yards |
| Wake Forest | Receiving | Taylor Morin | 7 receptions, 86 yards |
| Virginia Tech | Passing | Kyron Drones | 20/29, 321 yards, 2 TD |
| Virginia Tech | Rushing | Kyron Drones | 15 carries, 59 yards |
| Virginia Tech | Receiving | Jaylin Lane | 3 receptions, 102 yards, 2 TD |

=== NC State ===
NC State Wolfpack at Wake Forest Demon Deacons − Game summary

| Quarter | 1 | 2 | 3 | 4 | Total |
|---|---|---|---|---|---|
| Wolfpack | 7 | 14 | 0 | 5 | 26 |
| Demon Deacons | 0 | 0 | 0 | 6 | 6 |

at Allegacy Federal Credit Union Stadium, Winston-Salem, NC

- Date: November 11, 2023
- Game time: 2:00 p.m EST
- Game attendance: 29,591
- TV announcers (CW): Tom Werme (play-by-play), James Bates (analyst), and Treavor Scales (sideline)

Game information

First Quarter
Second Quarter
Third Quarter
Fourth Quarter

| Statistics | NCSU | WAKE |
|---|---|---|
| First downs | 19 | 8 |
| Total yards | 379 | 163 |
| Rushing yards | 268 | 7 |
| Passing yards | 111 | 156 |
| Turnovers | 1 | 2 |
| Time of possession | 40:16 | 19:44 |

| Team | Category | Player | Statistics |
|---|---|---|---|
| NC State | Passing | Brennan Armstrong | 12–17, 113 yards, 1 TD |
| NC State | Rushing | Brennan Armstrong | 15 rushes, 96 yards, 1 TD |
| NC State | Receiving | Dacari Collins | 2 receptions, 40 yards |
| Wake Forest | Passing | Michael Kern | 14–26, 137 yards, 1 TD, 1 INT |
| Wake Forest | Rushing | Demond Claiborne | 8 rushes, 12 yards |
| Wake Forest | Receiving | Horatio Fields | 3 receptions, 31 yards |

=== at No. 19 Notre Dame ===
Wake Forest Demon Deacons (4–6) vs. No. 19 Notre Dame Fighting Irish (7–3) – Game summary

| Quarter | 1 | 2 | 3 | 4 | Total |
|---|---|---|---|---|---|
| Wake Forest | 0 | 7 | 0 | 0 | 7 |
| No. 19 Notre Dame | 7 | 10 | 14 | 14 | 45 |

at Notre Dame Stadium • Notre Dame, IN

- Date: November 18, 2023
- Game time: 3:30 p.m.
- Game weather: Sunny, 50 °F (10 °C)
- Game attendance: 77,622
- Referee: Tim Hedgepeth
- TV announcers (NBC): Jac Collinsworth (play-by-play), Jason Garrett (analyst), and Zora Stephenson (reporter)

Game information

First quarter

- (0:54) ND – Devyn Ford 12-yard pass from Sam Hartman, Spencer Shrader kick (Drive: 9 plays, 71 yards, 4:41; Notre Dame 7–0)

Second quarter

- (11:41) WF – Tate Carney 9-yard run, Matthew Dennis kick (Drive: 7 plays, 72 yards, 4:07; Tied 7–7)
- (7:06) ND – Tobias Merriweather 35-yard pass from Sam Hartman, Spencer Shrader kick (Drive: 8 plays, 66 yards, 4:28; Notre Dame 14–7)
- (0:05) ND – Spencer Shrader 37-yard field goal (Drive: 10 plays, 51 yards, 1:30; Notre Dame 17–7)

Third quarter

- (14:09) ND – Eli Raridon 19-yard pass from Sam Hartman, Spencer Shrader kick (Drive: 1 play, 19 yards, 0:07; Notre Dame 24–0)
- (5:22) ND – Audric Estimé 2-yard run, Spencer Shrader kick (Drive: 5 plays, 54 yards, 2:07; Notre Dame 31-7)

Fourth quarter

- (13:24) ND – Jaden Greathouse 48-yard pass from Sam Hartman, Spencer Shrader kick (Drive: 1 play, 54 yards, 2:07; Notre Dame 38–0)
- (3:56) ND – Jordan Faison 17-yard pass from Steve Angeli, Marcello Diomede kick (Drive: 10 plays, 73 yards, 5:49; Notre Dame 45–7)

| Statistics | WAKE | ND |
|---|---|---|
| First downs | 14 | 25 |
| Total yards | 232 | 450 |
| Rushes/yards | 36–134 | 30–137 |
| Passing yards | 98 | 313 |
| Passing: Comp–Att–Int | 12–21–0 | 24–34–0 |
| Time of possession | 31:27 | 28:33 |

| Team | Category | Player | Statistics |
|---|---|---|---|
| Wake Forest | Passing | Michael Kern | 11/20, 81 yards |
| Wake Forest | Rushing | Ellison Justice | 15 carries, 63 yards |
| Wake Forest | Receiving | Jahmal Banks | 5 receptions, 35 yards |
| Notre Dame | Passing | Sam Hartman | 21/29, 277 yards, 4 TD |
| Notre Dame | Rushing | Audric Estimé | 22 carries, 115 yards, TD |
| Notre Dame | Receiving | Rico Flores Jr. | 8 receptions, 102 yards |

=== at Syracuse ===
| | 1 | 2 | 3 | 4 | Total |
|---|---|---|---|---|---|
| Demon Deacons | 7 | 3 | 7 | 14 | 31 |
| Orange | 7 | 7 | 7 | 14 | 35 |

== Players drafted into the NFL ==
| Round | Pick | Player | Position | NFL Club |
|---|---|---|---|---|
| 4 | 124 | Malik Mustapha | S | San Francisco 49ers |
| 5 | 174 | Caelen Carson | CB | Dallas Cowboys |
| 7 | 230 | Michael Jurgens | C | Minnesota Vikings |
