= Lawrance Toafili =

American football player (born 2001)

No. 9
- Position: Running back

Personal information
- Born: November 30, 2001 (age 24); St. Petersburg, Florida, U.S.
- Listed height: 6 ft 0 in (1.83 m)
- Listed weight: 185 lb (84 kg)

Career information
- High school: Pinellas Park (Largo, Florida)
- College: Florida State (2020–2024)
- NFL draft: 2025: undrafted

Career history
- New York Jets (2025)*; Orlando Storm (2026)*
- * Offseason or practice squad member only

Awards and highlights
- ACC Championship Game MVP (2023)
- Stats at Pro Football Reference

Lawrance Toafili (born November 30, 2001) is an American former professional football running back. He played college football for the Florida State Seminoles.

== Early life ==
Toafili was born on November 30, 2001 in St. Petersburg, Florida. He attended Pinellas Park High School in St. Petersburg, where he had 4,809 yards and 55 touchdowns in his career, including three 1000-yard rushing seasons. As a senior Toafili rushed for 1,463 yards on 194 carries and 18 total touchdowns. A four-star recruit out of high school, he committed to Florida State University on August 7, 2019.

== College career ==
Toafili played college football for the Florida State Seminoles from 2020 to 2024. He played in 55 games for the Seminoles, starting in 25 of them, recording 1,895 rushing yards and 15 rushing touchdowns in his five year career. Toafili also tallied 92 receptions for 905 yards and four touchdowns.

Toafili was named the MVP of the 2023 ACC Championship Game after rushing for 118 yards and one touchdown against the Louisville Cardinals. He broke a 3–3 deadlock in the third quarter when he took a direct snap from the wildcat formation, running for 73 yards to the Louisville two-yard line and then scored a touchdown on the next play.

=== College statistics ===
Legend
**Bold**	Career high

Year	Team	Games		Rushing				Receiving				Fumbles	
Year	Team	GP	GS	Att	Yds	Avg	TD	Rec	Yds	Avg	TD	Fum	Lost
2020	Florida State	8	2	37	356	**9.6**	2	12	120	10.0	0	0	0
2021	Florida State	9	2	32	163	5.1	1	10	116	**11.6**	**2**	1	1
2022	Florida State	**13**	6	93	457	4.9	**5**	24	**268**	11.2	1	**3**	**2**
2023	Florida State	**13**	5	69	**463**	6.7	4	21	186	8.9	1	2	**2**
2024	Florida State	12	**10**	**109**	456	4.2	3	**25**	215	8.6	0	2	1
Career		55	25	340	1,895	5.6	15	92	905	9.8	4	8	6

== Professional career ==
Pre-draft measurables
Height	Weight	Arm length	Hand span	40-yard dash	10-yard split	20-yard split	20-yard shuttle	Three-cone drill	Vertical jump	Broad jump	Bench press
6 ft 0 in (1.83 m)	194 lb (88 kg)	30 1/8 in (0.77 m)	8 3/4 in (0.22 m)	4.68 s	1.63 s	2.68 s	4.47 s	7.01 s	36 in (0.91 m)	10 ft 0 in (3.05 m)	11 reps
All values from Pro Day

=== New York Jets ===
After not being selected in the 2025 NFL draft, Toafili signed with the New York Jets as an undrafted free agent. He was released on August 24, 2025, as part of roster cut downs. Toafili was signed to the practice squad on September 1, before being cut on September 9, to make room for Keilan Robinson. On September 24, he was re-signed to the practice squad. Toafili was released by New York on October 3.

=== Orlando Storm ===
On February 20, 2026 Toafili was signed by the Orlando Storm of the United Football League (UFL).
