= Jawhar Jordan =

American football player (born 1999)

No. 25 – Houston Texans
- Position: Running back
- Roster status: Practice squad/injured

Personal information
- Born: August 18, 1999 (age 27); Long Island, New York, U.S
- Listed height: 5 ft 10 in (1.78 m)
- Listed weight: 186 lb (84 kg)

Career information
- High school: Hamilton (Chandler, Arizona)
- College: Syracuse (2019–2020); Louisville (2021–2023)
- NFL draft: 2024: 6th round, 205th overall pick

Career history
- Houston Texans (2024–present)

Awards and highlights
- First-team All-ACC (2023)

Career NFL statistics as of 2025
- Rushing yards: 193
- Rushing average: 4.5
- Receptions: 7
- Receiving yards: 34
- Stats at Pro Football Reference

Jawhar Kenyatta Jordan Jr. (born August 18, 1999) is an American professional football running back for the Houston Texans of the National Football League (NFL). He played college football for the Syracuse Orange and Louisville Cardinals.

== Early life ==
Jordan was born on Long Island, New York and attended Hamilton High School. In Jordan's high school career, he rushed for 3,501 yards and 48 touchdowns on 450 carries, while also bringing in 39 passes for 426 yards and five touchdowns. Jordan would decide to commit to play college football at the Syracuse University over other schools such as Arizona, Iowa State, Kansas, Missouri, and Rutgers.

== College career ==
=== Syracuse ===
In week eleven of the 2019 season, Jordan would rush for his first career touchdown in a win over Duke. Jordan would finish the 2019 season with 105 yards and a touchdown on 15 carries, while also notching two receptions for 87 yards, and returning four kickoffs for 114 yards. In the 2020 season, Jordan would total 72 yards on 29 carries, while also hauling in five passes for 34 yards. After the conclusion of the 2020 season, Jordan would decide to enter the NCAA transfer portal.

=== Louisville ===
Jordan would decide to transfer to the University of Louisville to play out the rest of his college career. In the 2021 First Responder Bowl, Jordan would return a kickoff 100 yards for a touchdown, but Louisville could not pull off the win falling to Air Force. Jordan finished the 2021 season with 94 yards on 14 carries, while also bringing in one pass for 24 yards, and returning five kicks for 183 yards and a touchdown. In week twelve of the 2022 season, Jordan rushed 16 times for 105 yards and a touchdown, while also returning a kick 98 yards for a touchdown, as he helped the Cardinals beat NC State. In the 2022 Fenway Bowl, Jordan rushed for 115 yards and two touchdowns, as he helped Louisville win their bowl, beating Cincinnati 24–7. For his performance in the game, Jordan was named the bowl's offensive MVP. In the 2022 season, Jordan finished the year with 815 yards and four touchdowns, on 142 carries, while also notching ten receptions for 85 yards. In week four of the 2023 season, Jordan would rush for 134 yards and two touchdowns, while also hauling in one pass for 75 yards and a touchdown, and returning a kickoff for 40 yards, as he helped the Cardinals beat Boston College 56–28. In week six, Jordan would rush for 143 yards and two touchdowns, as he helped Louisville upset #10 Notre Dame 33–20.

=== College Stats ===
Jordan finished his college career with 381 rushing attempts across 37 games. He rushed for 2,214 yards, averaging 5.8 yards per carry. He had 18 touchdowns, and rushed for 59.8 yards per game. Catching the ball out of the backfield, he pulled in 39 receptions for 476 yards and 1 touchdown. He averaged 12.2 yards per reception and 12.9 yards per game.

He was involved in a total of 420 plays, racking up 2,690 scrimmage yards while averaging 6.4 yards per play. He had 19 total touchdowns.

== Professional career ==
Pre-draft measurables
Height	Weight	Arm length	Hand span	Wingspan	40-yard dash	10-yard split	20-yard split	20-yard shuttle	Three-cone drill	Broad jump	Bench press
5 ft 9 1/2 in (1.77 m)	193 lb (88 kg)	30 1/8 in (0.77 m)	8 1/2 in (0.22 m)	5 ft 11 in (1.80 m)	4.56 s	1.54 s	2.65 s	4.52 s	7.00 s	10 ft 3 in (3.12 m)	12 reps
All values from NFL Combine/Pro Day

Jordan was selected by the Houston Texans in the sixth round (205th overall) of the 2024 NFL draft. He was waived on August 27, 2024, and later re-signed to the practice squad. Jordan signed a reserve/future contract with Houston on January 21, 2025.

On August 26, 2025, Jordan was waived by the Texans as part of final roster cuts, and re-signed to the practice squad. On December 14, Jordan made his NFL debut for the Texans against the Arizona Cardinals. He ran for 101 yards over 17 carries and gained 17 receiving yards. Jordan's 50-yard carry in the third quarter became the longest run for the Texans in the 2025 season and the longest run in franchise history for a player making their NFL debut. On December 16, the Texans signed Jordan to their active roster.

On August 30, 2026, Jordan was waived by the Texans as a part of final roster cuts; he was re-signed to the team's practice squad the next day.
