= Jamari Thrash =

American football player (born 2000)

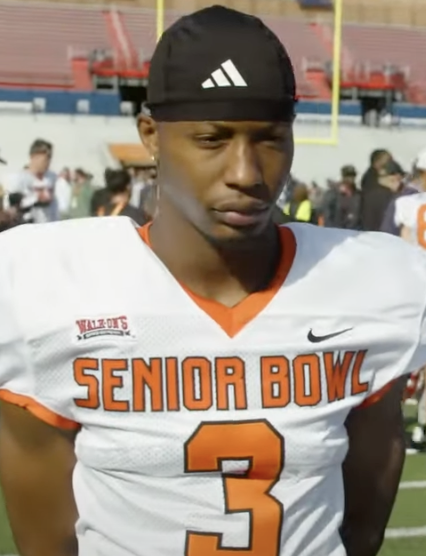
- Thrash in the Senior Bowl in 2024

No. 80 – Tennessee Titans
- Position: Wide receiver
- Roster status: Practice squad

Personal information
- Born: December 19, 2000 (age 25); LaGrange, Georgia, U.S.
- Listed height: 6 ft 0 in (1.83 m)
- Listed weight: 190 lb (86 kg)

Career information
- High school: Troup County (LaGrange}
- College: Georgia State (2019–2022); Louisville (2023)
- NFL draft: 2024: 5th round, 156th overall pick

Career history
- Cleveland Browns (2024–2026); Las Vegas Raiders (2026)*; Tennessee Titans (2026–present)*
- * Offseason or practice squad member only

Awards and highlights
- First-team All-Sun Belt (2022); Second-team All-ACC (2023)

Career NFL statistics as of 2025
- Receptions: 13
- Receiving yards: 129
- Stats at Pro Football Reference

Jamari Isiah Thrash (born December 19, 2000) is an American professional football wide receiver for the Tennessee Titans of the National Football League (NFL). He played college football for the Louisville Cardinals and Georgia State Panthers.

== Early life ==
Thrash was born in LaGrange, Georgia and attended Troup County High School. In Thrash's high school career, he hauled in 134 receptions for 2,839 yards and 31 touchdowns. Thrash would decide to commit to play college football at the Georgia State University.

== College career ==
=== Georgia State ===
In Thrash's first season in 2019, he caught two passes for 17 yards. In week three of the 2020 season, Thrash caught his first career touchdown on a 22-yard reception, as he helped Georgia State beat East Carolina 49–28. Thrash finished the 2020 season with nine receptions for 161 yards and two touchdowns. In week eight of the 2021 season, Thrash had a breakout game bringing in four receptions for 74 yards and a touchdown, as he helped the Panthers beat Texas State. Thrash finished the 2021 season, with 32 receptions for 452 yards and three touchdowns. In week three of the 2022 season, Thrash had a career performance, where he notched ten receptions for 213 yards and a touchdown, but Georgia State would fall versus Charlotte 42–41. In Georgia State's season finale, Thrash would bring in ten passes for 167 yards and a touchdown, but the Panthers could not hold on, as they fell to Marshall 28–23. Thrash finished the 2022 season with 62 receptions for 1,122 yards and seven touchdowns, while also rushing for five yards. For his performance on the season, Thrash was named first team all Sun Belt. After the conclusion of the 2022 season, Thrash announced that he had decided to enter the NCAA transfer portal, and continue the rest of his career elsewhere.

=== Louisville ===
Thrash would decide to transfer to Louisville to play out the rest of his career. In Thrash's Louisville debut in week one, he caught seven passes for 88 yards and two touchdowns, as he helped the Cardinals start their season off with a win beating Georgia Tech. In week three, Thrash would haul in four receptions for 159 yards, and a huge 85-yard touchdown, as he helped Louisville survive Indiana 21–14.

=== College Stats ===
Thrash played in 49 games and had 167 receptions for 2,610 yards. He averaged 15.6 yards/reception and had 18 touchdowns. He averaged 53.3 yards per game. Throughout his college career, he had 4 rushing attempts for 22 yards and 1 touchdown.

== Professional career ==
Pre-draft measurables
Height	Weight	Arm length	Hand span	Wingspan	40-yard dash	10-yard split	20-yard split	Three-cone drill	Vertical jump	Broad jump
5 ft 11 3/4 in (1.82 m)	188 lb (85 kg)	31 in (0.79 m)	8 5/8 in (0.22 m)	6 ft 2 1/2 in (1.89 m)	4.46 s	1.54 s	2.58 s	7.16 s	34.0 in (0.86 m)	10 ft 0 in (3.05 m)
All values from NFL Combine

=== Cleveland Browns ===
Thrash was drafted by the Cleveland Browns in the fifth round, with the 156th overall pick, in the 2024 NFL draft. He made nine appearances for Cleveland during his rookie campaign, recording three receptions for 22 scoreless yards.

On December 13, 2025, Thrash was waived by the Browns after Garrett Dellinger was signed to the team's active roster. Two days later, the Browns cut Dellinger and re-signed Thrash to their 53-man roster.

On April 6, 2026, Thrash re-signed with the Browns. He was waived on August 7 with an injury designation and reverted to injured reserve the next day. On September 11, Thrash was waived from injured reserve.

=== Las Vegas Raiders ===
On October 12, 2026, Thrash signed with the Las Vegas Raiders practice squad. He was waived on October 27.

=== Tennessee Titans ===
On November 17, 2026, Thrash signed with the Tennessee Titans practice squad.
