= Electoral history of the American Independent and American parties =

Elections featuring US political parties

This is a list detailing the electoral history of the American Independent and American Parties, sorted by year. While initially a single party, a schism occurred between factions that sought either to expand the party's influence beyond into the North, and those that sought to concentrate largely within the Deep South. Though they were by 1976 established as two parties, it remains difficult to ascertain which candidates were loyal to which faction, and so they have been collected for the sake of simplicity into a single list.

The list only consists of those candidates who ran for partisan office.

== Federal elections ==
=== Presidential tickets ===
| American Independent Party | | | | | | | American Party | | | | | |
| Year | Nominee | Nominee's Party | Running Mate | # Votes | % Votes | % Votes Where Balloted | Nominee | Nominee's Party | Running Mate | # Votes | % Votes | % Votes Where Balloted |
|---|---|---|---|---|---|---|---|---|---|---|---|---|
| 1968 | George Wallace | American Independent | Curtis LeMay | 9,906,473 | 13.53 | 13.56 | | | | | | |
| 1972 | John G. Schmitz | American Independent | Thomas J. Anderson | 1,099,482 | 1.42 | 2.25 | | | | | | |
| 1976 | Lester Maddox | American Independent | William Dyke | 170,531 | 0.21 | 0.57 | Thomas J. Anderson | American | Rufus E. Shackleford | 160,773 | 0.20 | |
| 1980 | John Rarick | American Independent | Eileen Shearer | 41,268 | 0.05 | 0.26 | Percy L. Greaves, Jr. | American | Frank L. Varnum | 6,648 | 0.01 | |
| | | | | | | | Frank W. Shelton | American - Kansas | George E. Jackson | 1,555 | 0.00 | |
| | | | | | | | No nominee | American - Minnesota | No nominee | 6,136 | 0.01 | |
| 1984 | Bob Richards | Populist | Maureen Salaman | 66,336 | 0.07 | 0.25 | Delmar Dennis | American | Traves Brownlee | 13,161 | 0.01 | |
| 1988 | James C. Griffin | American Independent | Charles Morsa | 27,818 | 0.03 | 0.28 | Delmar Dennis | American | Earl Jeppson | 3,475 | 0.00 | |
| 1992 | Howard Phillips | U.S. Taxpayers' | Albion Knight, Jr. | 42,960 | 0.04 | 0.10 | Robert J. Smith | American | Doris Feimer | 292 | 0.00 | |
| 1996 | Howard Phillips | U.S. Taxpayers' | Herb Titus | 182,820 | 0.19 | 0.23 | Diane Beall Templin | American | Gary Van Horn | 1,847 | 0.00 | |
| 2000 | Howard Phillips | Constitution | Curtis Frazier | 98,020 | 0.09 | 0.12 | Don Rogers | American | Al Moore | 0 | 0.00 | N/A |
| 2004 | Michael Peroutka | Constitution | Chuck Baldwin | 143,630 | 0.12 | 0.17 | Diane Beall Templin | American | Al Moore | 0 | 0.00 | N/A |
| 2008 | Alan Keyes | America's Independent Party | Wiley Drake | 47,694 | 0.04 | 0.19 | Diane Beall Templin | American | Linda Patterson | 0 | 0.00 | N/A |
| 2012 | Tom Hoefling | America's Party | Robert Ornelas | 40,641 | 0.03 | 0.17 | | | | | | |

==== Presidential nominating conventions ====
A.I.P. National Convention Presidential Balloting, 1972
| Candidate | # Votes | % Votes |
|---|---|---|
| John G. Schmitz | 329.75 | 71.92 |
| Lester Maddox | 55.65 | 12.14 |
| Allen Greer | 25.5 | 5.56 |
| Thomas J. Anderson | 23.6 | 5.15 |
| Richard B. Kay | 16 | 3.49 |
| George Wallace | 8 | 1.74 |

| A.I.P. National Convention Presidential Balloting, 1976 | | | American National Convention Presidential Balloting, 1976 | | |
| Candidate | # Votes | % Votes | Candidate | # Votes | % Votes |
|---|---|---|---|---|---|
| Lester Maddox | 177 | 52.21 | Thomas J. Anderson | 160 | 61.54 |
| Robert J. Morris | 80 1/3 | 23.60 | William H. Bowler | 42.7 | 16.54 |
| John Rarick | 78 11/12 | 23.30 | Percy L. Greaves, Jr. | 29.7 | 11.54 |
| Others | 2.75 | 0.89 | Others | 26.6 | 10.38 |

A.I.P. National Convention Presidential Balloting, 1980
| Candidate | # Votes | % Votes |
|---|---|---|
| John Rarick | 63.5 | 84.67 |
| Percy L. Greaves, Jr. | 10.5 | 14.00 |
| James Schumacher | 1 | 1.33 |

A.I.P. National Convention Presidential Balloting, 1988
| Candidate | # Votes | % Votes |
|---|---|---|
| James C. Griffin | ? | |
| David Duke | | |

A.I.P. National Convention Presidential Balloting, 1992
| Candidate | # Votes | % Votes |
|---|---|---|
| Howard Phillips | 40 | 83.33 |
| Bo Gritz | 8 | 16.67 |

A.I.P. National Convention Presidential Balloting, 2012
| Candidate | # Votes | % Votes |
|---|---|---|
| Tom Hoefling | 20 | 100 |
| Virgil Goode | 0 | 0 |

==== Presidential primaries ====
| California Presidential Primary, 1976 | | | Idaho Presidential Primary, 1976 | | |
| Candidate | # Votes | % Votes | Candidate | # Votes | % Votes |
|---|---|---|---|---|---|
| George J. Shea | 3,447 | 28.57 | John R. Rarick | 409 | 53.68 |
| John R. Rarick | 2,922 | 24.22 | Thomas J. Anderson | 261 | 34.25 |
| Andrew J. Watson | 2,447 | 20.28 | Uncommitted | 92 | 12.07 |
| Alberta M. Procell | 1,719 | 14.25 | | | |
| Thomas M. Goodloe, Jr. | 1,523 | 12.62 | | | |
| Others | 7 | 0.06 | | | |
| Total | 12,065 | 100.00 | Total | 762 | 100.00 |

| California Presidential Primary, 1980 | | | Idaho Presidential Primary, 1980 | | |
| Candidate | # Votes | % Votes | Candidate | # Votes | % Votes |
|---|---|---|---|---|---|
| Morton Downey, Jr. | 10,838 | 51.11 | John R. Rarick | 97 | 60.63 |
| John R. Rarick | 10,358 | 48.85 | None | 63 | 39.38 |
| Others | 9 | 0.04 | | | |
| Total | 21,205 | 100.00 | Total | 160 | 100.00 |

California Presidential Primary, 1984
| Candidate | # Votes | % Votes |
|---|---|---|
| Charles R. Glenn | 7,374 | 44.68 |
| Arthur J. Lowery | 3,567 | 21.61 |
| Gordon Mohr | 3,052 | 18.49 |
| Gerald Willis | 2,507 | 15.19 |
| Others | 4 | 0.02 |
| Total | 16,504 | 100.00 |

California Presidential Primary, 1988
| Candidate | # Votes | % Votes |
|---|---|---|
| James C. Griffin | 9,792 | 64.44 |
| Bo Gritz | 5,401 | 35.54 |
| Others | 3 | 0.02 |
| Total | 15,196 | 100.00 |

California Presidential Primary, 1992
| Candidate | # Votes | % Votes |
|---|---|---|
| Howard Phillips | 15,456 | 99.92 |
| Barbara S. Scott-Davenport | 13 | 0.08 |
| Total | 15,469 | 100.00 |

California Presidential Primary, 1996
| Candidate | # Votes | % Votes |
|---|---|---|
| Howard Phillips | 19,204 | 100.00 |
| Total | 19,204 | 100.00 |

County Results of the 2008 Presidential Primary. Counties won by Don Grundmann are in Blue, Diane Templin in Red, and Max Riekse in Green.

California Presidential Primary, 2000
| Candidate | # Votes | % Votes |
|---|---|---|
| John McCain | 31,363 | 31.24 |
| Al Gore | 26,675 | 26.57 |
| George Bush | 22,661 | 22.58 |
| Bill Bradley | 8,222 | 8.19 |
| Alan Keyes | 3,595 | 3.58 |
| Howard Phillips | 3,022 | 3.01 |
| Ralph Nader | 1,881 | 1.87 |
| Donald Trump | 577 | 0.57 |
| Harry Browne | 385 | 0.38 |
| Steve Forbes | 383 | 0.38 |
| Lyndon LaRouche | 210 | 0.21 |
| Orrin Hatch | 183 | 0.18 |
| John Hagelin | 154 | 0.15 |
| George D. Weber | 152 | 0.15 |
| Gary Bauer | 151 | 0.15 |
| Joel Kovel | 123 | 0.12 |
| Robert M. Bowman | 108 | 0.11 |
| John B. Anderson | 103 | 0.10 |
| Kip Lee | 101 | 0.10 |
| Charles E. Collins | 93 | 0.09 |
| L. Neil Smith | 91 | 0.09 |
| Larry Hines | 75 | 0.07 |
| David Lynn Hollist | 70 | 0.07 |
| Total | 100,378 | 100.00 |

California Presidential Primary, 2004
| Candidate | # Votes | % Votes |
|---|---|---|
| Michael Peroutka | 26,589 | 100.00 |
| Total | 26,589 | 100.00 |

California Presidential Primary, 2008
| Candidate | # Votes | % Votes |
|---|---|---|
| Don J. Grundmann | 16,603 | 36.08 |
| Diane Beall Templin | 15,302 | 33.25 |
| Max Riekse | 14,099 | 30.64 |
| David Andrew Larson | 18 | 0.04 |
| Total | 46,022 | 100.00 |

California Presidential Primary, 2012
| Candidate | # Votes | % Votes |
|---|---|---|
| Edward C. Noonan | 16,926 | 38.74 |
| Laurie Roth | 16,326 | 37.37 |
| Max Riekse | 10,430 | 23.87 |
| Raymond Delmond Smith | 6 | 0.01 |
| Andrew Diaz | 4 | 0.01 |
| Total | 43,692 | 100.00 |

=== Senatorial elections ===
==== Senate Class I ====
California Class I Senatorial Candidates
| Year | Nominee | Nominee's Party | # Votes | % Votes | Place | Note |
|---|---|---|---|---|---|---|
| 1970 | Charles C. Ripley | American Independent | 61,251 | 0.94 | 3rd of 4 | |
| 1976 | Jack McCoy | American Independent | 82,739 | 1.11 | 4th of 5 | |
| 1982 | Theresa F. Dietrich | American Independent | 83,809 | 1.07 | 5th of 5 | |
| 1988 | Merton D. Short | American Independent | 66,291 | 0.68 | 5th of 5 | |
| 1992 SE | Paul Meeuwenberg | American Independent | 281,973 | 2.62 | 4th of 5 | |
| 1994 | Paul Meeuwenberg | American Independent | 142,771 | 1.68 | 5th of 6 | |
| 2000 | Diane Beall Templin | American Independent | 134,598 | 1.27 | 5th of 7 | |
| 2006 | Don J. Grundmann | American Independent | 75,350 | 0.88 | 6th of 6 | |
| 2012 OP | Don J. Grundmann | American Independent | 33,037 | 0.68 | 18th of 24 | |

Indiana Class I Senatorial Candidates
| Year | Nominee | Nominee's Party | # Votes | % Votes | Place | Note |
|---|---|---|---|---|---|---|
| 1976 | Don L. Lee | American | 14,321 | 0.66 | 3rd of 4 | |
| 1982 | Raymond James | American | 10,586 | 0.58 | 3rd of 3 | |

==== Senate Class II ====
Alabama Class II Senatorial Candidates
| Year | Nominee | Nominee's Party | # Votes | % Votes | Place | Note |
|---|---|---|---|---|---|---|
| 1972 | Herbert W. Stone | Alabama Conservative | 6,838 | 0.65 | 5th of 5 | |

==== Senate Class III ====
Alabama Class III Senatorial Candidates
| Year | Nominee | Nominee's Party | # Votes | % Votes | Place | Note |
|---|---|---|---|---|---|---|
| 1980 | Michael R. Erdy | Alabama Conservative | 15,989 | 1.23 | 3rd of 7 | |

California Class III Senatorial Candidates
| Year | Nominee | Nominee's Party | # Votes | % Votes | Place | Note |
|---|---|---|---|---|---|---|
| 1974 | Jack McCoy | American Independent | 101,145 | 1.66 | 3rd of 4 | |
| 1980 | James C. Griffin | American Independent | 129,648 | 1.56 | 5th of 5 | |
| 1986 | Edward B Vallen | American Independent | 109,916 | 1.49 | 3rd of 5 | |
| 1992 | Jerome McCready | American Independent | 373,051 | 3.45 | 3rd of 5 | |
| 1998 | H. Joseph Perrin, Sr. | American Independent | 54,711 | 0.66 | 5th of 7 | |
| 2004 | Don J. Grundmann | American Independent | 81,224 | 0.67 | 5th of 5 | |
| 2010 | Edward C. Noonan | American Independent | 125,441 | 1.25 | 6th of 6 | |

Indiana Class I Senatorial Candidates
| Year | Nominee | Nominee's Party | # Votes | % Votes | Place | Note |
|---|---|---|---|---|---|---|
| 1974 | Don L. Lee | American | 49,592 | 2.83 | 3rd of 3 | |
| 1986 | Rockland Snyder | American | 5,914 | 0.38 | 4th of 4 | |
