= 1976 United States presidential election in Arizona =

- November 2, 1976

All 6 Arizona electoral votes to the Electoral College

Nominee	Gerald Ford	Jimmy Carter
Party	Republican	Democratic
Home state	Michigan	Georgia
Running mate	Bob Dole	Walter Mondale
Electoral vote	6	0
Popular vote	418,642	295,602
Percentage	56.37%	39.80%
County results
Ford
40–50%
50–60%
60–70%
Carter
50–60%
60–70%
President before election
Gerald Ford
Republican
Elected President
Jimmy Carter
Democratic

The 1976 United States presidential election in Arizona was part of the 1976 United States presidential election, which took place on November 2, 1976, throughout all fifty states and Washington D.C. Voters chose six representatives, or electors to the Electoral College, who voted for president and vice president.

Arizona voted strongly for the Republican nominee, incumbent President Gerald Ford, over the Democratic nominee, Georgia Governor Jimmy Carter. The state turned out to be the sixth most Republican in the nation behind Utah, Idaho, Alaska, Nebraska and Wyoming, as it was already perceived that Carter – highly popular in his native South – lacked any understanding of the environment, economy, culture and political issues of the West.

Carter did improve upon the performance of the preceding Democratic nominee, South Dakota Senator George McGovern, swinging away from the GOP by fifteen percentage points.

== Results ==
1976 United States presidential election in Arizona
Party	Candidate	Votes	Percentage	Electoral votes
Republican	Gerald Ford (incumbent)	418,642	56.37%	6
Democratic	Jimmy Carter	295,602	39.80%	0
Independent	Eugene McCarthy	19,229	2.59%	0
Libertarian	Roger MacBride	7,647	1.03%	0
Socialist Workers	Peter Camejo	928	0.12%	0
American	Thomas J. Anderson (write-in)	564	0.08%	0
American Independent	Lester Maddox (write-in)	85	0.01%	0
United American	Frank Taylor (write-in)	22	0.00%	0
Invalid or blank votes				—
Totals		742,719	100.00%	6
Voter turnout (Voting age/Registered voters)				46%/80%

=== Results by county ===
County	Gerald Ford Republican		Jimmy Carter Democratic		Eugene McCarthy Independent		Various candidates Other parties		Margin		Total votes cast
County	#	%	#	%	#	%	#	%	#	%	Total votes cast
Apache	3,447	33.38%	6,583	63.75%	173	1.68%	124	1.20%	-3,136	-30.37%	10,327
Cochise	9,921	49.90%	9,281	46.68%	452	2.27%	229	1.15%	640	3.22%	19,883
Coconino	11,036	51.53%	9,450	44.12%	737	3.44%	195	0.91%	1,586	7.41%	21,418
Gila	5,136	42.94%	6,440	53.84%	249	2.08%	137	1.15%	-1,304	-10.90%	11,962
Graham	3,659	52.59%	3,050	43.83%	138	1.98%	111	1.60%	609	8.76%	6,958
Greenlee	1,532	36.07%	2,601	61.24%	81	1.91%	33	0.78%	-1,069	-25.17%	4,247
Maricopa	258,262	61.66%	144,613	34.53%	10,106	2.41%	5,860	1.40%	113,649	27.13%	418,841
Mohave	7,601	51.92%	6,504	44.43%	351	2.40%	184	1.26%	1,097	7.49%	14,640
Navajo	6,796	46.68%	7,323	50.30%	273	1.88%	168	1.15%	-527	-3.62%	14,560
Pima	77,264	49.83%	71,214	45.93%	5,075	3.27%	1,508	0.97%	6,050	3.90%	155,061
Pinal	9,354	45.40%	10,595	51.42%	462	2.24%	193	0.94%	-1,241	-6.02%	20,604
Santa Cruz	2,312	48.80%	2,265	47.80%	123	2.60%	38	0.80%	47	1.00%	4,738
Yavapai	12,998	60.18%	7,685	35.58%	620	2.87%	297	1.38%	5,313	24.60%	21,600
Yuma	9,324	52.15%	7,998	44.73%	389	2.18%	169	0.95%	1,326	7.42%	17,880
Totals	418,642	56.37%	295,602	39.80%	19,229	2.59%	9,246	1.24%	123,040	16.57%	742,719

==== Counties that flipped from Republican to Democratic ====
- Apache
- Gila
- Navajo
- Pinal

=== By congressional district ===
Ford won all 4 of the state's congressional districts, including 2 which elected Democrats.

District	Ford	Carter	Representative
1st	61.3%	38.7%	John Jacob Rhodes
2nd	51.7%	48.3%	Mo Udall
3rd	59.9%	40.1%	Sam Steiger
3rd	59.9%	40.1%	Bob Stump
4th	61.6%	38.4%	John Conlan
4th	61.6%	38.4%	Eldon Rudd

=== Electors ===
Electors were chosen by their party's voters in primary elections held on September 7, 1976.

Jimmy Carter & Walter Mondale Democratic Party	Gerald Ford & Bob Dole Republican Party	Eugene McCarthy Independent	Roger MacBride & David Bergland Libertarian Party	Peter Camejo & Willie Mae Reid Socialist Workers Party
M. Joyce Geyser; Milton T. Hagedorn; Katie Kendrick; Tino LaPaglia; David Wayne Lilly; Jo Ann Pope	Jacquelynn R. Egan; Raleigh W. Johnson; Terrence S. Martin; Sue Sossaman; Allen Wood; Elva E. Wubbolding	Eugenia M. Bermudez; Frank Kadish; Mary J. Maffeo; Alice Doyle Mahoney; Wick Mitchell; Everett L. Taylor	Bruce J. Cameron; Emil A. Franzi; James T. Kirk; Michael H. Ross; Albert A. Schaffer; Jaimie C. Stevens	Alberta June Dannells; Patrick John Dempsey; Maurice Charles Houston; Rodney G. Peffer; Jessica M. Sampson; Anthony Francis Spachtholz

Thomas J. Anderson & Rufus Shackelford American Party	Lester Maddox & William Dyke American Independent Party	Frank Taylor United American Party	Ernest L. Miller Restoration Party
Pat Cavanaugh; Dan Hough; Anne Lewis; George McDavitt; James Severance; Glen Woods	W. Anderson; E. Harrington; K. Kerber; C. Titus; J. Vaughn; V. Vaughn	Olive Elizabeth McClung; Lois Adele Swan; Oliver Warren Swan; Valeda Evelyn Swan; Charlotte Taylor; James Rea Weidlein	John B. Brehm; Edna B. Crum; Margaret Peterlin; Roman Peterlin; Oscar L. Reigel; Natalie E. Ryciak
