= 1980 United States presidential election in Iowa =

- November 4, 1980

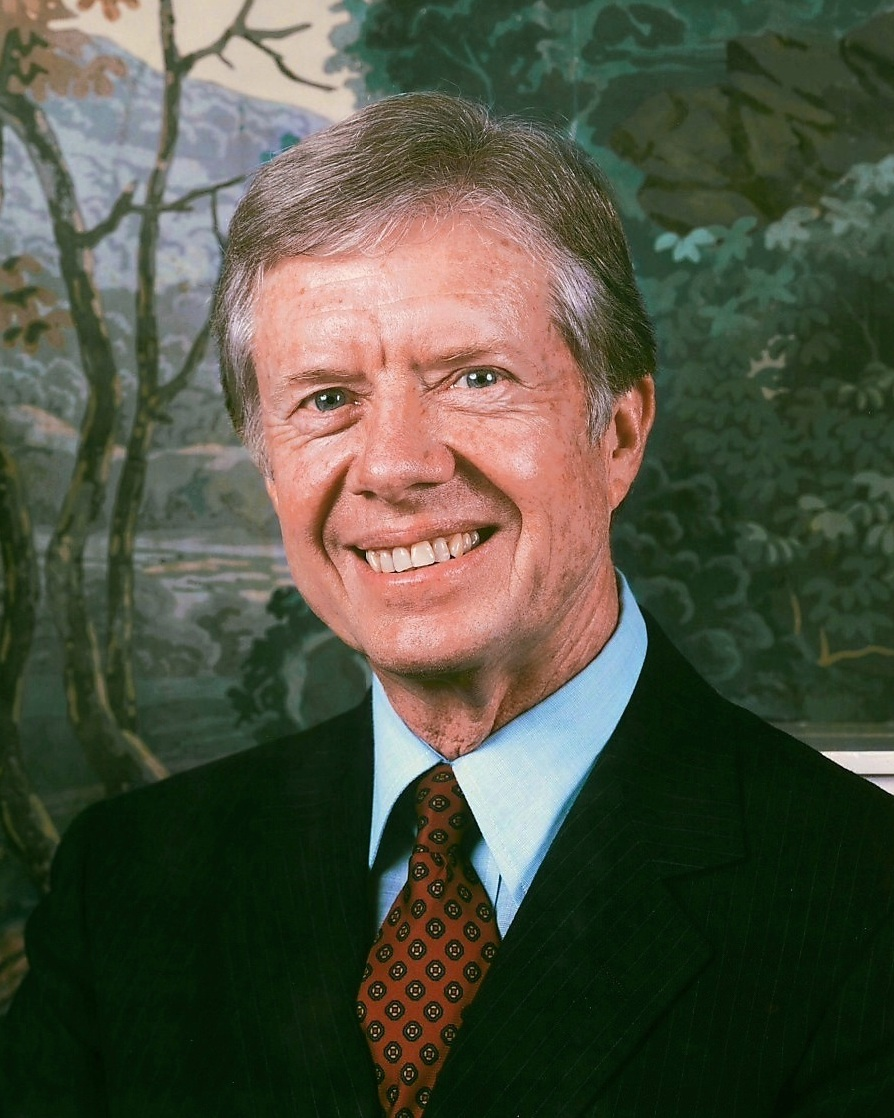

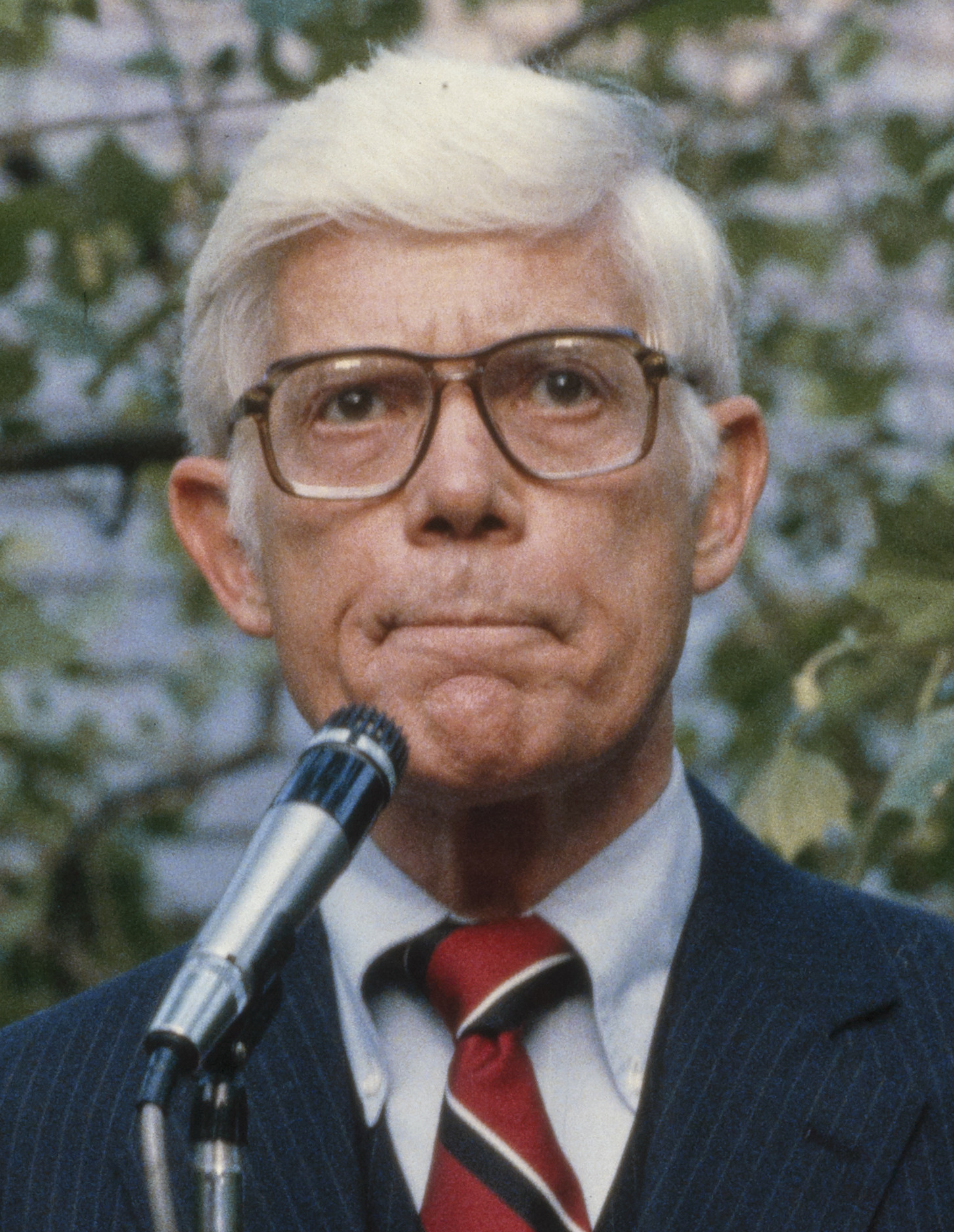
| Nominee | Ronald Reagan | Jimmy Carter | John B. Anderson |
| Party | Republican | Democratic | Independent (Nominated By Petition) |
| Home state | California | Georgia | Illinois |
| Running mate | George H. W. Bush | Walter Mondale | Patrick Lucey |
| Electoral vote | 8 | 0 | 0 |
| Popular vote | 676,026 | 508,672 | 115,633 |
| Percentage | 51.31% | 38.60% | 8.78% |
County results
Reagan
40–50%
50–60%
60–70%
70–80%
Carter
40–50%
50–60%
President before election
Jimmy Carter
Democratic
Elected President
Ronald Reagan
Republican

The 1980 United States presidential election in Iowa took place on November 4, 1980. All 50 states and The District of Columbia were part of the 1980 United States presidential election. Voters chose eight electors to the Electoral College, who voted for president and vice president.

Iowa was won by former California Governor Ronald Reagan (R) by a comfortable margin of about 13 points. This was the last presidential election in which a Republican won Iowa by more than 10 points until 2024, as well as the last time a Republican won Polk County, home to Iowa's capital and most populated city, Des Moines. It was also the last time until Donald Trump in 2016 that a Republican presidential candidate won the following counties: Boone, Cerro Gordo, Lee, Webster and Worth.

== Caucus Results ==
1980 Democratic Caucus Results
| Candidate | SDE | Delegates |
|---|---|---|
| Jimmy Carter (incumbent) | 1,840 | 35 |
| Ted Kennedy | 995 | 19 |
| Uncommitted | 304 | 0 |
| Totals | 3,139 | 54 |

Note: SDE stands for 'State Delegate Equivalents' which (until 2020) was the closest thing to a popular vote available for the Democratic Caucus.

1980 Republican Caucus Results
| Candidate | Votes | Delegates |
|---|---|---|
| George H.W. Bush | 33,530 | 15 |
| Ronald Reagan | 31,348 | 15 |
| Howard Baker | 16,216 | 8 |
| John Connally | 9,861 | 0 |
| Phil Crane | 7,135 | 0 |
| John Anderson | 4,585 | 0 |
| Uncommitted | 1,800 | 0 |
| Robert Dole | 1,576 | 0 |
| Totals | 106,051 | 38 |

== Results ==
| Presidential Candidate | Running Mate | Party | Electoral Vote (EV) | Popular Vote (PV) | |
|---|---|---|---|---|---|
| Ronald Reagan of California | George H. W. Bush | Republican | 8 | 676,026 | 51.31% |
| Jimmy Carter (incumbent) | Walter Mondale (incumbent) | Democratic | 0 | 508,672 | 38.60% |
| John B. Anderson | Patrick Lucey | Independent | 0 | 115,633 | 8.78% |
| Edward E. Clark | David Koch | Libertarian | 0 | 13,123 | 1.00% |
| Barry Commoner | LaDonna Harris | Citizens | 0 | 2,273 | 0.17% |
| David McReynolds | Diane Drufenbrock | Socialist | 0 | 534 | 0.04% |
| — | — | Write-ins | 0 | 519 | 0.04% |
| Gus Hall | Angela Davis | Communist | 0 | 298 | 0.02% |
| Clifton DeBerry | Matilde Zimmermann | Socialist Workers | 0 | 244 | 0.02% |
| Percy Greaves Jr. | Frank Varnum | American | 0 | 189 | 0.01% |
| Benjamin Bubar | Earl Dodge | Statesman | 0 | 150 | 0.01% |

=== Results by county ===
| County | Ronald Reagan Republican | | Jimmy Carter Democratic | | John B. Anderson Independent | | Ed Clark Libertarian | | Barry Commoner Citizens | | Various candidates Other parties | | Margin | | Total votes cast |
| County | # | % | # | % | # | % | # | % | # | % | # | % | # | % | Total votes cast |
|---|---|---|---|---|---|---|---|---|---|---|---|---|---|---|---|
| Adair | 2,821 | 60.16% | 1,454 | 31.01% | 356 | 7.59% | 48 | 1.02% | 8 | 0.17% | 2 | 0.04% | 1,367 | 29.15% | 4,689 |
| Adams | 1,779 | 59.62% | 940 | 31.50% | 214 | 7.17% | 45 | 1.51% | 2 | 0.07% | 4 | 0.13% | 839 | 28.12% | 2,984 |
| Allamakee | 4,000 | 60.73% | 2,170 | 32.95% | 343 | 5.21% | 54 | 0.82% | 11 | 0.17% | 8 | 0.12% | 1,830 | 27.78% | 6,586 |
| Appanoose | 3,544 | 52.68% | 2,769 | 41.16% | 353 | 5.25% | 50 | 0.74% | 5 | 0.07% | 7 | 0.10% | 775 | 11.52% | 6,728 |
| Audubon | 2,523 | 57.96% | 1,546 | 35.52% | 251 | 5.77% | 25 | 0.57% | 4 | 0.09% | 4 | 0.09% | 977 | 22.44% | 4,353 |
| Benton | 5,329 | 50.11% | 4,223 | 39.71% | 948 | 8.91% | 116 | 1.09% | 6 | 0.06% | 13 | 0.12% | 1,106 | 10.40% | 10,635 |
| Black Hawk | 29,627 | 46.49% | 27,443 | 43.07% | 5,847 | 9.18% | 535 | 0.84% | 121 | 0.19% | 149 | 0.23% | 2,184 | 3.42% | 63,722 |
| Boone | 5,732 | 47.42% | 5,126 | 42.41% | 1,081 | 8.94% | 120 | 0.99% | 16 | 0.13% | 12 | 0.10% | 606 | 5.01% | 12,087 |
| Bremer | 6,706 | 59.25% | 3,527 | 31.16% | 970 | 8.57% | 97 | 0.86% | 13 | 0.11% | 5 | 0.04% | 3,179 | 28.09% | 11,318 |
| Buchanan | 5,041 | 53.50% | 3,605 | 38.26% | 689 | 7.31% | 76 | 0.81% | 6 | 0.06% | 5 | 0.05% | 1,436 | 15.24% | 9,422 |
| Buena Vista | 5,272 | 54.49% | 3,468 | 35.84% | 771 | 7.97% | 144 | 1.49% | 8 | 0.08% | 13 | 0.13% | 1,804 | 18.65% | 9,676 |
| Butler | 4,730 | 65.90% | 1,990 | 27.73% | 392 | 5.46% | 56 | 0.78% | 5 | 0.07% | 4 | 0.06% | 2,740 | 38.17% | 7,177 |
| Calhoun | 3,633 | 57.41% | 2,150 | 33.98% | 407 | 6.43% | 122 | 1.93% | 4 | 0.06% | 12 | 0.19% | 1,483 | 23.43% | 6,328 |
| Carroll | 5,017 | 51.53% | 3,885 | 39.90% | 736 | 7.56% | 84 | 0.86% | 7 | 0.07% | 8 | 0.08% | 1,132 | 11.63% | 9,737 |
| Cass | 5,391 | 66.34% | 2,176 | 26.78% | 475 | 5.85% | 70 | 0.86% | 3 | 0.04% | 11 | 0.14% | 3,215 | 39.56% | 8,126 |
| Cedar | 4,398 | 56.41% | 2,589 | 33.21% | 697 | 8.94% | 83 | 1.06% | 18 | 0.23% | 12 | 0.15% | 1,809 | 23.20% | 7,797 |
| Cerro Gordo | 11,189 | 49.01% | 9,363 | 41.02% | 2,024 | 8.87% | 185 | 0.81% | 31 | 0.14% | 36 | 0.16% | 1,826 | 7.99% | 22,828 |
| Cherokee | 4,087 | 54.49% | 2,719 | 36.25% | 599 | 7.99% | 81 | 1.08% | 2 | 0.03% | 12 | 0.16% | 1,368 | 18.24% | 7,500 |
| Chickasaw | 3,929 | 52.86% | 2,935 | 39.49% | 500 | 6.73% | 60 | 0.81% | 2 | 0.03% | 7 | 0.09% | 994 | 13.37% | 7,433 |
| Clarke | 2,417 | 54.88% | 1,614 | 36.65% | 310 | 7.04% | 59 | 1.34% | 1 | 0.02% | 3 | 0.07% | 803 | 18.23% | 4,404 |
| Clay | 4,479 | 51.11% | 3,179 | 36.27% | 991 | 11.31% | 101 | 1.15% | 7 | 0.08% | 7 | 0.08% | 1,300 | 14.84% | 8,764 |
| Clayton | 5,115 | 55.56% | 3,297 | 35.81% | 669 | 7.27% | 106 | 1.15% | 9 | 0.10% | 10 | 0.11% | 1,818 | 19.75% | 9,206 |
| Clinton | 13,025 | 51.66% | 9,698 | 38.47% | 2,140 | 8.49% | 260 | 1.03% | 35 | 0.14% | 53 | 0.21% | 3,327 | 13.19% | 25,211 |
| Crawford | 4,883 | 61.02% | 2,500 | 31.24% | 509 | 6.36% | 97 | 1.21% | 10 | 0.12% | 3 | 0.04% | 2,383 | 29.78% | 8,002 |
| Dallas | 6,296 | 48.57% | 5,310 | 40.96% | 1,200 | 9.26% | 128 | 0.99% | 16 | 0.12% | 14 | 0.11% | 986 | 7.61% | 12,964 |
| Davis | 2,003 | 50.97% | 1,689 | 42.98% | 200 | 5.09% | 32 | 0.81% | 2 | 0.05% | 4 | 0.10% | 314 | 7.99% | 3,930 |
| Decatur | 2,212 | 47.67% | 2,048 | 44.14% | 318 | 6.85% | 50 | 1.08% | 7 | 0.15% | 5 | 0.11% | 164 | 3.53% | 4,640 |
| Delaware | 4,316 | 55.38% | 2,671 | 34.27% | 727 | 9.33% | 62 | 0.80% | 16 | 0.21% | 2 | 0.03% | 1,645 | 21.11% | 7,794 |
| Des Moines | 9,158 | 44.85% | 9,977 | 48.87% | 1,041 | 5.10% | 183 | 0.90% | 29 | 0.14% | 29 | 0.14% | -819 | -4.02% | 20,417 |
| Dickinson | 4,028 | 54.13% | 2,620 | 35.21% | 687 | 9.23% | 86 | 1.16% | 11 | 0.15% | 10 | 0.13% | 1,408 | 18.92% | 7,442 |
| Dubuque | 18,649 | 44.90% | 18,689 | 44.99% | 3,708 | 8.93% | 368 | 0.89% | 67 | 0.16% | 58 | 0.14% | -40 | -0.09% | 41,539 |
| Emmet | 3,062 | 53.49% | 2,153 | 37.61% | 446 | 7.79% | 55 | 0.96% | 4 | 0.07% | 4 | 0.07% | 909 | 15.88% | 5,724 |
| Fayette | 6,374 | 55.32% | 4,377 | 37.98% | 647 | 5.61% | 100 | 0.87% | 10 | 0.09% | 15 | 0.13% | 1,997 | 17.34% | 11,523 |
| Floyd | 4,665 | 51.16% | 3,634 | 39.86% | 728 | 7.98% | 66 | 0.72% | 5 | 0.05% | 20 | 0.22% | 1,031 | 11.30% | 9,118 |
| Franklin | 3,290 | 57.90% | 1,920 | 33.79% | 406 | 7.15% | 56 | 0.99% | 3 | 0.05% | 7 | 0.12% | 1,370 | 24.11% | 5,682 |
| Fremont | 2,693 | 65.19% | 1,203 | 29.12% | 191 | 4.62% | 43 | 1.04% | 1 | 0.02% | 0 | 0.00% | 1,490 | 36.07% | 4,131 |
| Greene | 3,154 | 53.11% | 2,210 | 37.21% | 510 | 8.59% | 55 | 0.93% | 5 | 0.08% | 5 | 0.08% | 944 | 15.90% | 5,939 |
| Grundy | 4,644 | 66.10% | 1,869 | 26.60% | 440 | 6.26% | 56 | 0.80% | 10 | 0.14% | 7 | 0.10% | 2,775 | 39.50% | 7,026 |
| Guthrie | 3,214 | 58.29% | 1,866 | 33.84% | 384 | 6.96% | 44 | 0.80% | 3 | 0.05% | 3 | 0.05% | 1,348 | 24.45% | 5,514 |
| Hamilton | 4,745 | 57.40% | 2,741 | 33.16% | 679 | 8.21% | 82 | 0.99% | 11 | 0.13% | 8 | 0.10% | 2,004 | 24.24% | 8,266 |
| Hancock | 3,681 | 60.42% | 1,918 | 31.48% | 462 | 7.58% | 17 | 0.28% | 8 | 0.13% | 6 | 0.10% | 1,763 | 28.94% | 6,092 |
| Hardin | 5,329 | 53.72% | 3,757 | 37.87% | 730 | 7.36% | 89 | 0.90% | 3 | 0.03% | 12 | 0.12% | 1,572 | 15.85% | 9,920 |
| Harrison | 4,502 | 63.83% | 2,152 | 30.51% | 311 | 4.41% | 81 | 1.15% | 1 | 0.01% | 6 | 0.09% | 2,350 | 33.32% | 7,053 |
| Henry | 4,430 | 52.35% | 3,317 | 39.20% | 629 | 7.43% | 70 | 0.83% | 11 | 0.13% | 5 | 0.06% | 1,113 | 13.15% | 8,462 |
| Howard | 2,975 | 53.35% | 2,214 | 39.71% | 336 | 6.03% | 42 | 0.75% | 5 | 0.09% | 4 | 0.07% | 761 | 13.64% | 5,576 |
| Humboldt | 3,575 | 60.60% | 1,840 | 31.19% | 394 | 6.68% | 77 | 1.31% | 7 | 0.12% | 6 | 0.10% | 1,735 | 29.41% | 5,899 |
| Ida | 2,825 | 64.88% | 1,235 | 28.36% | 254 | 5.83% | 37 | 0.85% | 1 | 0.02% | 2 | 0.05% | 1,590 | 36.52% | 4,354 |
| Iowa | 4,153 | 55.21% | 2,606 | 34.65% | 667 | 8.87% | 84 | 1.12% | 5 | 0.07% | 7 | 0.09% | 1,547 | 20.56% | 7,522 |
| Jackson | 4,479 | 51.17% | 3,518 | 40.19% | 622 | 7.11% | 106 | 1.21% | 16 | 0.18% | 13 | 0.15% | 961 | 10.98% | 8,754 |
| Jasper | 8,286 | 48.84% | 7,258 | 42.78% | 1,221 | 7.20% | 152 | 0.90% | 28 | 0.17% | 21 | 0.12% | 1,028 | 6.06% | 16,966 |
| Jefferson | 4,099 | 56.16% | 2,577 | 35.31% | 505 | 6.92% | 99 | 1.36% | 9 | 0.12% | 10 | 0.14% | 1,522 | 20.85% | 7,299 |
| Johnson | 13,642 | 31.73% | 20,122 | 46.80% | 8,101 | 18.84% | 508 | 1.18% | 403 | 0.94% | 221 | 0.51% | -6,480 | -15.07% | 42,997 |
| Jones | 4,506 | 50.56% | 3,521 | 39.50% | 759 | 8.52% | 114 | 1.28% | 4 | 0.04% | 9 | 0.10% | 985 | 11.06% | 8,913 |
| Keokuk | 3,145 | 52.64% | 2,390 | 40.00% | 369 | 6.18% | 62 | 1.04% | 1 | 0.02% | 8 | 0.13% | 755 | 12.64% | 5,975 |
| Kossuth | 5,568 | 54.26% | 3,810 | 37.13% | 775 | 7.55% | 94 | 0.92% | 10 | 0.10% | 5 | 0.05% | 1,758 | 17.13% | 10,262 |
| Lee | 8,793 | 48.14% | 8,204 | 44.92% | 1,047 | 5.73% | 183 | 1.00% | 21 | 0.11% | 17 | 0.09% | 589 | 3.22% | 18,265 |
| Linn | 36,254 | 46.35% | 31,950 | 40.84% | 8,773 | 11.22% | 994 | 1.27% | 107 | 0.14% | 146 | 0.19% | 4,304 | 5.51% | 78,224 |
| Louisa | 2,530 | 55.19% | 1,700 | 37.09% | 291 | 6.35% | 57 | 1.24% | 4 | 0.09% | 2 | 0.04% | 830 | 18.10% | 4,584 |
| Lucas | 2,593 | 52.61% | 1,989 | 40.35% | 291 | 5.90% | 49 | 0.99% | 6 | 0.12% | 1 | 0.02% | 604 | 12.26% | 4,929 |
| Lyon | 4,349 | 70.05% | 1,431 | 23.05% | 375 | 6.04% | 48 | 0.77% | 2 | 0.03% | 3 | 0.05% | 2,918 | 47.00% | 6,208 |
| Madison | 3,320 | 51.79% | 2,496 | 38.93% | 505 | 7.88% | 72 | 1.12% | 7 | 0.11% | 11 | 0.17% | 824 | 12.86% | 6,411 |
| Mahaska | 5,650 | 54.52% | 3,968 | 38.29% | 603 | 5.82% | 106 | 1.02% | 21 | 0.20% | 15 | 0.14% | 1,682 | 16.23% | 10,363 |
| Marion | 6,665 | 49.30% | 5,490 | 40.61% | 1,232 | 9.11% | 108 | 0.80% | 10 | 0.07% | 13 | 0.10% | 1,175 | 8.69% | 13,518 |
| Marshall | 10,707 | 54.56% | 7,114 | 36.25% | 1,541 | 7.85% | 188 | 0.96% | 37 | 0.19% | 39 | 0.20% | 3,593 | 18.31% | 19,626 |
| Mills | 3,581 | 69.09% | 1,244 | 24.00% | 281 | 5.42% | 60 | 1.16% | 6 | 0.12% | 11 | 0.21% | 2,337 | 45.09% | 5,183 |
| Mitchell | 3,401 | 58.00% | 2,040 | 34.79% | 361 | 6.16% | 49 | 0.84% | 5 | 0.09% | 8 | 0.14% | 1,361 | 23.21% | 5,864 |
| Monona | 3,268 | 61.85% | 1,660 | 31.42% | 275 | 5.20% | 69 | 1.31% | 6 | 0.11% | 6 | 0.11% | 1,608 | 30.43% | 5,284 |
| Monroe | 2,003 | 48.65% | 1,866 | 45.32% | 216 | 5.25% | 22 | 0.53% | 4 | 0.10% | 6 | 0.15% | 137 | 3.33% | 4,117 |
| Montgomery | 4,115 | 67.97% | 1,556 | 25.70% | 301 | 4.97% | 65 | 1.07% | 5 | 0.08% | 12 | 0.20% | 2,559 | 42.27% | 6,054 |
| Muscatine | 7,829 | 51.69% | 5,597 | 36.96% | 1,522 | 10.05% | 160 | 1.06% | 21 | 0.14% | 16 | 0.11% | 2,232 | 14.73% | 15,145 |
| O'Brien | 4,937 | 63.61% | 2,210 | 28.48% | 536 | 6.91% | 63 | 0.81% | 8 | 0.10% | 7 | 0.09% | 2,727 | 35.13% | 7,761 |
| Osceola | 2,177 | 62.45% | 1,051 | 30.15% | 234 | 6.71% | 20 | 0.57% | 2 | 0.06% | 2 | 0.06% | 1,126 | 32.30% | 3,486 |
| Page | 5,618 | 71.93% | 1,772 | 22.69% | 356 | 4.56% | 49 | 0.63% | 5 | 0.06% | 10 | 0.13% | 3,846 | 49.24% | 7,810 |
| Palo Alto | 3,025 | 50.69% | 2,463 | 41.27% | 412 | 6.90% | 60 | 1.01% | 4 | 0.07% | 4 | 0.07% | 562 | 9.42% | 5,968 |
| Plymouth | 6,515 | 62.97% | 2,965 | 28.66% | 756 | 7.31% | 92 | 0.89% | 8 | 0.08% | 10 | 0.10% | 3,550 | 34.31% | 10,346 |
| Pocahontas | 3,194 | 56.17% | 1,959 | 34.45% | 397 | 6.98% | 113 | 1.99% | 7 | 0.12% | 16 | 0.28% | 1,235 | 21.72% | 5,686 |
| Polk | 64,156 | 44.63% | 61,984 | 43.12% | 15,819 | 11.00% | 1,301 | 0.90% | 309 | 0.21% | 189 | 0.13% | 2,172 | 1.51% | 143,758 |
| Pottawattamie | 20,222 | 60.96% | 10,709 | 32.29% | 1,870 | 5.64% | 319 | 0.96% | 17 | 0.05% | 33 | 0.10% | 9,513 | 28.67% | 33,170 |
| Poweshiek | 4,598 | 50.52% | 3,529 | 38.77% | 821 | 9.02% | 72 | 0.79% | 66 | 0.73% | 16 | 0.18% | 1,069 | 11.75% | 9,102 |
| Ringgold | 1,884 | 57.95% | 1,150 | 35.37% | 191 | 5.88% | 25 | 0.77% | 1 | 0.03% | 0 | 0.00% | 734 | 22.58% | 3,251 |
| Sac | 3,725 | 59.47% | 1,976 | 31.55% | 467 | 7.46% | 89 | 1.42% | 1 | 0.02% | 6 | 0.10% | 1,749 | 27.92% | 6,264 |
| Scott | 34,701 | 51.09% | 26,391 | 38.85% | 5,760 | 8.48% | 832 | 1.22% | 143 | 0.21% | 99 | 0.15% | 8,310 | 12.24% | 67,926 |
| Shelby | 4,147 | 64.03% | 1,892 | 29.21% | 372 | 5.74% | 54 | 0.83% | 7 | 0.11% | 5 | 0.08% | 2,255 | 34.82% | 6,477 |
| Sioux | 10,768 | 76.01% | 2,698 | 19.04% | 610 | 4.31% | 64 | 0.45% | 17 | 0.12% | 10 | 0.07% | 8,070 | 56.97% | 14,167 |
| Story | 15,829 | 42.36% | 13,529 | 36.20% | 7,252 | 19.41% | 503 | 1.35% | 184 | 0.49% | 74 | 0.20% | 2,300 | 6.16% | 37,371 |
| Tama | 4,840 | 56.27% | 3,049 | 35.45% | 593 | 6.89% | 98 | 1.14% | 8 | 0.09% | 14 | 0.16% | 1,791 | 20.82% | 8,602 |
| Taylor | 2,715 | 64.44% | 1,226 | 29.10% | 240 | 5.70% | 28 | 0.66% | 1 | 0.02% | 3 | 0.07% | 1,489 | 35.34% | 4,213 |
| Union | 3,372 | 56.40% | 2,182 | 36.49% | 368 | 6.15% | 46 | 0.77% | 3 | 0.05% | 8 | 0.13% | 1,190 | 19.91% | 5,979 |
| Van Buren | 2,142 | 58.21% | 1,311 | 35.63% | 183 | 4.97% | 36 | 0.98% | 2 | 0.05% | 6 | 0.16% | 831 | 22.58% | 3,680 |
| Wapello | 7,475 | 42.31% | 8,923 | 50.50% | 1,050 | 5.94% | 176 | 1.00% | 27 | 0.15% | 17 | 0.10% | -1,448 | -8.19% | 17,668 |
| Warren | 7,360 | 47.43% | 6,610 | 42.59% | 1,369 | 8.82% | 131 | 0.84% | 22 | 0.14% | 27 | 0.17% | 750 | 4.84% | 15,519 |
| Washington | 3,967 | 52.01% | 2,877 | 37.72% | 703 | 9.22% | 67 | 0.88% | 4 | 0.05% | 9 | 0.12% | 1,090 | 14.29% | 7,627 |
| Wayne | 2,221 | 54.12% | 1,627 | 39.64% | 218 | 5.31% | 36 | 0.88% | 2 | 0.05% | 0 | 0.00% | 594 | 14.48% | 4,104 |
| Webster | 10,438 | 49.63% | 9,001 | 42.80% | 1,386 | 6.59% | 154 | 0.73% | 28 | 0.13% | 23 | 0.11% | 1,437 | 6.83% | 21,030 |
| Winnebago | 3,808 | 58.77% | 2,208 | 34.08% | 417 | 6.44% | 35 | 0.54% | 4 | 0.06% | 7 | 0.11% | 1,600 | 24.69% | 6,479 |
| Winneshiek | 5,033 | 54.10% | 3,201 | 34.40% | 938 | 10.08% | 81 | 0.87% | 39 | 0.42% | 12 | 0.13% | 1,832 | 19.70% | 9,304 |
| Woodbury | 23,553 | 54.43% | 15,930 | 36.81% | 3,184 | 7.36% | 489 | 1.13% | 41 | 0.09% | 78 | 0.18% | 7,623 | 17.62% | 43,275 |
| Worth | 2,247 | 52.13% | 1,721 | 39.93% | 301 | 6.98% | 31 | 0.72% | 5 | 0.12% | 5 | 0.12% | 526 | 12.20% | 4,310 |
| Wright | 3,936 | 55.07% | 2,645 | 37.01% | 497 | 6.95% | 57 | 0.80% | 4 | 0.06% | 8 | 0.11% | 1,291 | 18.06% | 7,147 |
| Totals | 676,026 | 51.31% | 508,672 | 38.60% | 115,633 | 8.78% | 13,123 | 1.00% | 2,273 | 0.17% | 1,934 | 0.15% | 167,354 | 12.71% | 1,317,661 |

==== Counties that flipped from Democratic to Republican ====
- Adams
- Appanoose
- Audubon
- Benton
- Boone
- Carroll
- Cerro Gordo
- Chickasaw
- Clarke
- Crawford
- Dallas
- Davis
- Decatur
- Floyd
- Greene
- Guthrie
- Hamilton
- Henry
- Howard
- Jackson
- Jasper
- Keokuk
- Kossuth
- Lee
- Linn
- Lucas
- Madison
- Marion
- Mitchell
- Monona
- Monroe
- Palo Alto
- Pocahontas
- Polk
- Poweshiek
- Ringgold
- Tama
- Union
- Van Buren
- Warren
- Webster
- Wayne
- Worth
- Wright

== See also ==
- United States presidential elections in Iowa
