= 1980 United States presidential election in Indiana =

- November 4, 1980
- Turnout: 57.7% ▼2.4 pp

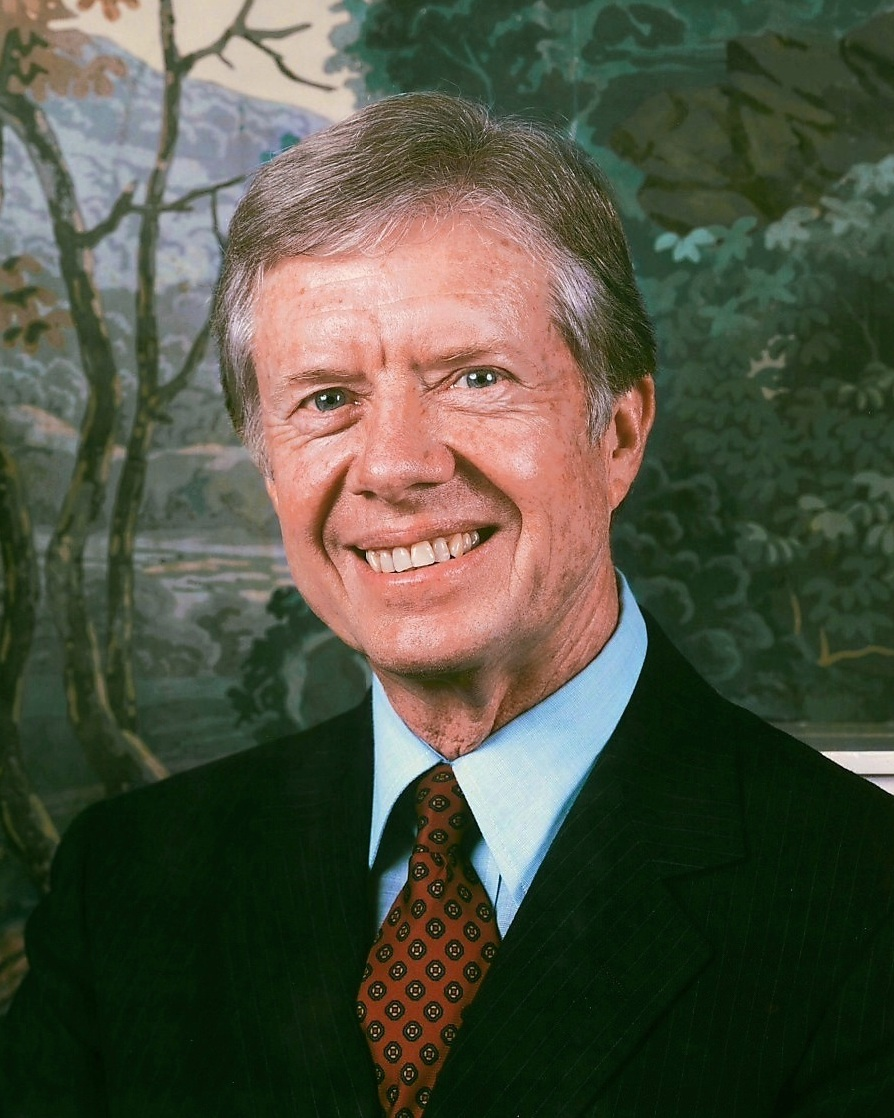
Nominee	Ronald Reagan	Jimmy Carter
Party	Republican	Democratic
Home state	California	Georgia
Running mate	George H. W. Bush	Walter Mondale
Electoral vote	13	0
Popular vote	1,255,656	844,197
Percentage	56.01%	37.65%
County results
Reagan
40–50%
50–60%
60–70%
70–80%
Carter
40–50%
50–60%
President before election
Jimmy Carter
Democratic
Elected President
Ronald Reagan
Republican

A presidential election was held in Indiana on November 4, 1980, as part of the 1980 United States presidential election. The Republican ticket of the former governor of California Ronald Reagan and the former director of central intelligence George H. W. Bush defeated the Democratic ticket of the incumbent president of the United States Jimmy Carter and the vice president of the United States Walter Mondale. Reagan defeated Carter in the national election with 489 electoral votes.

== Primary elections ==
=== Republican Party ===
Indiana Republican primary, May 6, 1980
Party	Candidate	Votes	%
Republican	Ronald Reagan	419,016	73.73
Republican	George H. W. Bush	92,955	16.36
Republican	John B. Anderson (withdrawn)	56,342	9.91
Total votes		568,313	100.00

=== Democratic Party ===
Indiana Democratic primary, May 6, 1980
Party	Candidate	Votes	%
Democratic	Jimmy Carter	398,949	67.68
Democratic	Ted Kennedy	190,492	32.32
Total votes		589,441	100.00

== General election ==
=== Results ===
1980 United States presidential election in Indiana
Party	Candidate	Votes	%	±%
Republican	Ronald Reagan George H. W. Bush	1,255,656	56.01	▲2.69
Democratic	Jimmy Carter Walter Mondale	844,197	37.65	▼8.05
Independent	John B. Anderson Patrick Lucey	111,639	4.98	▲4.98
Libertarian	Ed Clark David Koch	19,627	0.88	▲0.88
Citizens	Barry Commoner LaDonna Harris	4,852	0.22	▲0.22
American	Percy Greaves Jr. Frank Varnum	4,750	0.21	▼0.42
Communist	Gus Hall Angela Davis	702	0.03	▲0.03
Socialist Workers	Clifton DeBerry Matilde Zimmerman	610	0.03	▼0.23
Total votes		2,242,033	100.00	

=== Results by county ===
1980 United States presidential election in Indiana by county
County	Ronald Reagan Republican		Jimmy Carter Democratic		John B. Anderson Independent		Ed Clark Libertarian		Others		Margin		Total
County	Votes	%	Votes	%	Votes	%	Votes	%	Votes	%	Votes	%	Total
Adams	6,368	53.16%	4,673	39.01%	767	6.40%	135	1.13%	35	0.29%	1,695	14.15%	11,978
Allen	68,524	57.63%	37,765	31.76%	10,368	8.72%	1,329	1.12%	912	0.77%	30,759	25.87%	118,898
Bartholomew	15,801	58.58%	9,260	34.33%	1,604	5.95%	219	0.81%	90	0.33%	6,541	24.25%	26,974
Benton	3,189	64.26%	1,520	30.63%	187	3.77%	58	1.17%	9	0.18%	1,669	33.63%	4,963
Blackford	3,168	53.14%	2,431	40.77%	258	4.33%	66	1.11%	39	0.65%	737	12.37%	5,962
Boone	10,484	66.11%	4,535	28.60%	681	4.29%	131	0.83%	28	0.18%	5,949	37.51%	15,859
Brown	2,884	54.51%	2,014	38.06%	237	4.48%	77	1.46%	79	1.49%	870	16.45%	5,291
Carroll	5,262	60.49%	2,966	34.10%	338	3.89%	107	1.23%	26	0.30%	2,296	26.39%	8,699
Cass	11,500	62.93%	5,838	31.95%	696	3.81%	150	0.82%	90	0.49%	5,662	30.98%	18,274
Clark	15,508	49.74%	14,137	45.34%	1,102	3.53%	160	0.51%	274	0.88%	1,371	4.40%	31,181
Clay	6,980	59.09%	4,363	36.94%	311	2.63%	132	1.12%	26	0.22%	2,617	22.15%	11,812
Clinton	8,158	58.43%	5,258	37.66%	427	3.06%	97	0.69%	22	0.16%	2,900	20.77%	13,962
Crawford	2,554	52.51%	2,130	43.79%	124	2.55%	40	0.82%	16	0.33%	424	8.72%	4,864
Daviess	7,022	60.89%	4,057	35.18%	345	2.99%	82	0.71%	26	0.23%	2,965	25.71%	11,532
Dearborn	7,467	56.36%	5,135	38.76%	464	3.50%	99	0.75%	84	0.63%	2,332	17.60%	13,249
Decatur	5,819	58.48%	3,646	36.64%	377	3.79%	75	0.75%	34	0.34%	2,173	21.84%	9,951
DeKalb	7,886	56.53%	4,911	35.20%	883	6.33%	160	1.15%	110	0.79%	2,975	21.33%	13,950
Delaware	28,342	53.83%	20,923	39.74%	2,743	5.21%	449	0.85%	190	0.36%	7,419	14.09%	52,647
Dubois	6,775	47.46%	6,700	46.93%	578	4.05%	108	0.76%	115	0.81%	75	0.53%	14,276
Elkhart	30,081	61.40%	14,883	30.38%	3,256	6.65%	435	0.89%	339	0.69%	15,198	31.02%	48,994
Fayette	6,004	55.94%	4,304	40.10%	293	2.73%	73	0.68%	58	0.54%	1,700	15.84%	10,732
Floyd	12,456	48.91%	11,543	45.33%	1,047	4.11%	166	0.65%	255	1.00%	913	3.58%	25,467
Fountain	5,289	62.18%	2,845	33.45%	280	3.29%	79	0.93%	13	0.15%	2,444	28.73%	8,506
Franklin	4,551	59.10%	2,834	36.80%	234	3.04%	66	0.86%	16	0.21%	1,717	22.30%	7,701
Fulton	5,458	62.53%	2,788	31.94%	349	4.00%	105	1.20%	28	0.32%	2,670	30.59%	8,728
Gibson	7,643	50.32%	6,834	44.99%	591	3.89%	102	0.67%	19	0.13%	809	5.33%	15,189
Grant	19,078	61.72%	10,390	33.61%	1,043	3.37%	233	0.75%	165	0.53%	8,688	28.11%	30,909
Greene	7,452	52.86%	6,027	42.75%	299	2.12%	135	0.96%	185	1.31%	1,425	10.11%	14,098
Hamilton	26,218	74.22%	7,036	19.92%	1,736	4.91%	265	0.75%	72	0.20%	19,182	54.30%	35,327
Hancock	12,093	66.67%	5,124	28.25%	746	4.11%	143	0.79%	32	0.18%	6,969	38.42%	18,138
Harrison	6,287	54.23%	4,865	41.96%	341	2.94%	70	0.60%	31	0.27%	1,422	12.27%	11,594
Hendricks	19,366	68.88%	7,412	26.36%	1,048	3.73%	227	0.81%	64	0.23%	11,954	42.52%	28,117
Henry	12,724	60.03%	7,626	35.98%	562	2.65%	241	1.14%	43	0.20%	5,098	24.05%	21,196
Howard	21,272	59.24%	12,916	35.97%	1,325	3.69%	284	0.79%	113	0.31%	8,356	23.27%	35,910
Huntington	9,497	59.59%	5,415	33.98%	824	5.17%	150	0.94%	51	0.32%	4,082	25.61%	15,937
Jackson	8,903	55.85%	6,425	40.30%	430	2.70%	108	0.68%	76	0.48%	2,478	15.55%	15,942
Jasper	6,316	68.09%	2,544	27.43%	283	3.05%	60	0.65%	73	0.79%	3,772	40.66%	9,276
Jay	5,351	58.06%	3,256	35.33%	484	5.25%	101	1.10%	25	0.27%	2,095	22.73%	9,217
Jefferson	6,831	52.20%	5,496	42.00%	477	3.64%	109	0.83%	174	1.33%	1,335	10.20%	13,087
Jennings	5,498	55.98%	3,931	40.02%	281	2.86%	59	0.60%	53	0.54%	1,567	15.96%	9,822
Johnson	20,018	66.34%	8,445	27.99%	1,348	4.47%	298	0.99%	65	0.22%	11,573	38.35%	30,174
Knox	10,083	53.57%	7,829	41.59%	617	3.28%	150	0.80%	143	0.76%	2,254	11.98%	18,822
Kosciusko	15,633	68.78%	5,684	25.01%	1,164	5.12%	195	0.86%	54	0.24%	9,949	43.77%	22,730
LaGrange	4,259	62.49%	2,095	30.74%	377	5.53%	76	1.12%	8	0.12%	2,164	31.75%	6,815
Lake	95,408	46.02%	101,145	48.78%	8,275	3.99%	1,417	0.68%	1,094	0.53%	-5,737	-2.76%	207,339
LaPorte	22,424	55.32%	15,387	37.96%	2,080	5.13%	493	1.22%	154	0.38%	7,037	17.36%	40,538
Lawrence	10,846	62.71%	5,826	33.68%	380	2.20%	138	0.80%	106	0.61%	5,020	29.03%	17,296
Madison	35,582	57.31%	23,554	37.93%	2,389	3.85%	439	0.71%	128	0.21%	12,028	19.38%	62,092
Marion	168,680	53.67%	126,103	40.13%	15,709	5.00%	2,538	0.81%	1,239	0.39%	42,577	13.54%	314,269
Marshall	10,209	62.21%	5,113	31.16%	836	5.09%	148	0.90%	105	0.64%	5,096	31.05%	16,411
Martin	3,082	53.33%	2,479	42.90%	149	2.58%	63	1.09%	6	0.10%	603	10.43%	5,779
Miami	8,672	60.63%	4,927	34.44%	508	3.55%	112	0.78%	85	0.59%	3,745	26.19%	14,304
Monroe	18,233	49.42%	13,316	36.09%	3,921	10.63%	515	1.40%	909	2.46%	4,917	13.33%	36,894
Montgomery	9,936	66.61%	4,158	27.87%	622	4.17%	152	1.02%	49	0.33%	5,778	38.74%	14,917
Morgan	13,321	68.53%	5,439	27.98%	498	2.56%	125	0.64%	55	0.28%	7,882	40.55%	19,438
Newton	3,850	66.81%	1,649	28.61%	194	3.37%	56	0.97%	14	0.24%	2,201	38.20%	5,763
Noble	7,624	57.40%	4,721	35.54%	749	5.64%	130	0.98%	58	0.44%	2,903	21.86%	13,282
Ohio	1,264	52.23%	1,074	44.38%	57	2.36%	22	0.91%	3	0.12%	190	7.85%	2,420
Orange	5,073	59.28%	3,228	37.72%	181	2.11%	55	0.64%	21	0.25%	1,845	21.56%	8,558
Owen	3,632	58.47%	2,325	37.43%	188	3.03%	55	0.89%	12	0.19%	1,307	21.04%	6,212
Parke	4,595	62.82%	2,432	33.25%	194	2.65%	82	1.12%	12	0.16%	2,163	29.57%	7,315
Perry	4,350	45.94%	4,540	47.95%	448	4.73%	95	1.00%	35	0.37%	-190	-2.01%	9,468
Pike	3,343	48.09%	3,346	48.13%	190	2.73%	57	0.82%	16	0.23%	-3	-0.04%	6,952
Porter	30,055	64.20%	12,869	27.49%	3,061	6.54%	651	1.39%	180	0.38%	17,186	36.71%	46,816
Posey	6,096	53.69%	4,465	39.33%	667	5.87%	106	0.93%	20	0.18%	1,631	14.36%	11,354
Pulaski	3,916	62.06%	2,092	33.15%	175	2.77%	61	0.97%	66	1.05%	1,824	28.91%	6,310
Putnam	7,090	60.35%	3,996	34.01%	501	4.26%	122	1.04%	39	0.33%	3,094	26.34%	11,748
Randolph	7,762	62.65%	4,025	32.49%	426	3.44%	153	1.23%	24	0.19%	3,737	30.16%	12,390
Ripley	5,770	56.39%	4,022	39.30%	303	2.96%	102	1.00%	36	0.35%	1,748	17.09%	10,233
Rush	4,829	64.29%	2,388	31.79%	224	2.98%	59	0.79%	11	0.15%	2,441	32.50%	7,511
St. Joseph	50,607	49.08%	44,218	42.88%	6,962	6.75%	840	0.81%	487	0.47%	6,389	6.20%	103,114
Scott	3,432	46.83%	3,694	50.40%	139	1.90%	33	0.45%	31	0.42%	-262	-3.57%	7,329
Shelby	10,496	61.20%	5,861	34.17%	614	3.58%	128	0.75%	51	0.30%	4,635	27.03%	17,150
Spencer	5,284	54.45%	4,153	42.79%	196	2.02%	47	0.48%	25	0.26%	1,131	11.66%	9,705
Starke	5,035	55.27%	3,615	39.68%	297	3.26%	75	0.82%	88	0.97%	1,420	15.59%	9,110
Steuben	5,670	62.94%	2,606	28.93%	602	6.68%	100	1.11%	30	0.33%	3,064	34.01%	9,008
Sullivan	4,465	49.05%	4,335	47.62%	212	2.33%	70	0.77%	21	0.23%	130	1.43%	9,103
Switzerland	1,584	47.14%	1,704	50.71%	38	1.13%	24	0.71%	10	0.30%	-120	-3.57%	3,360
Tippecanoe	27,589	56.92%	14,636	30.20%	5,141	10.61%	558	1.15%	546	1.13%	12,953	26.72%	48,470
Tipton	5,150	63.81%	2,547	31.56%	285	3.53%	49	0.61%	40	0.50%	2,603	32.25%	8,071
Union	1,766	63.53%	898	32.30%	92	3.31%	21	0.76%	3	0.11%	868	31.23%	2,780
Vanderburgh	36,248	51.07%	29,930	42.17%	4,150	5.85%	464	0.65%	190	0.27%	6,318	8.90%	70,982
Vermillion	4,195	49.94%	3,793	45.15%	269	3.20%	127	1.51%	16	0.19%	402	4.79%	8,400
Vigo	24,133	51.87%	19,261	41.40%	2,484	5.34%	533	1.15%	116	0.25%	4,872	10.47%	46,527
Wabash	8,738	60.82%	4,620	32.15%	797	5.55%	137	0.95%	76	0.53%	4,118	28.67%	14,368
Warren	2,665	64.11%	1,287	30.96%	145	3.49%	55	1.32%	5	0.12%	1,378	33.15%	4,157
Warrick	8,681	52.39%	6,845	41.31%	890	5.37%	131	0.79%	23	0.14%	1,836	11.08%	16,570
Washington	5,234	56.30%	3,663	39.40%	191	2.05%	58	0.62%	151	1.62%	1,571	16.90%	9,297
Wayne	16,981	60.53%	9,599	34.22%	1,174	4.19%	216	0.77%	82	0.29%	7,382	26.31%	28,052
Wells	5,864	56.14%	3,760	36.00%	717	6.86%	85	0.81%	19	0.18%	2,104	20.14%	10,445
White	6,999	64.48%	3,247	29.91%	466	4.29%	120	1.11%	23	0.21%	3,752	34.57%	10,855
Whitley	7,146	55.74%	4,497	35.08%	928	7.24%	206	1.61%	44	0.34%	2,649	20.66%	12,821
TOTAL	1,255,656	56.01%	844,197	37.65%	111,639	4.98%	19,627	0.88%	10,914	0.49%	411,459	18.36%	2,242,033

==== Counties that flipped from Democratic to Republican ====
- Blackford
- Clark
- Crawford
- Dearborn
- Dubois
- Floyd
- Gibson
- Greene
- Harrison
- Jefferson
- Knox
- Martin
- Ohio
- Owen
- Posey
- Spencer
- Starke
- Sullivan
- Vermillion
- Vigo
- Warrick
- Washington

=== Results by congressional district ===
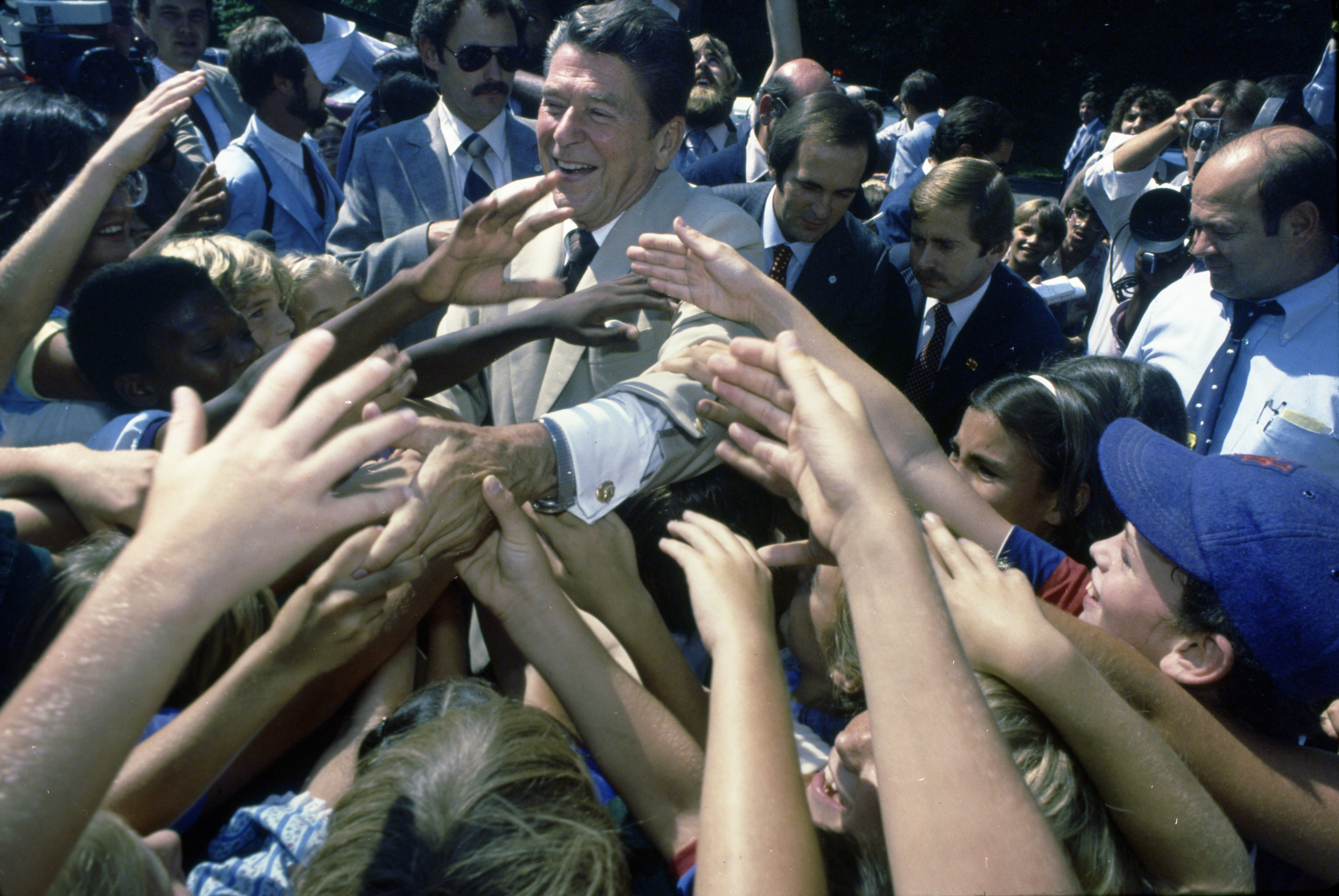
Ronald Reagan shaking hands with supporters at a campaign stop in Indiana.

District	Reagan	Carter	Representative
1st	41.3%	54.8%	Adam Benjamin Jr.
2nd	64.5%	29.2%	Floyd Fithian
3rd	54.4%	39.3%	John Brademas (96th Congress)
3rd	54.4%	39.3%	John P. Hiler (97th Congress)
4th	59.3%	33.2%	Dan Quayle (96th Congress)
4th	59.3%	33.2%	Dan Coats (97th Congress)
5th	63.5%	31.8%	Elwood Hillis
6th	62.7%	32.9%	David W. Evans
7th	57.4%	37.4%	John T. Myers
8th	53.5%	42.3%	H. Joel Deckard
9th	54.6%	41.7%	Lee H. Hamilton
10th	59.4%	36.1%	Philip Sharp
11th	53.9%	41.3%	Andrew Jacobs Jr.

== See also ==
- United States presidential elections in Indiana

== Bibliography ==
- Congressional Quarterly (1985). Congressional Quarterly's Guide to U.S. Elections (2nd ed.). Washington D.C.: Congressional Quarterly.
- Madison, James H. (1986). The Indiana Way: A State History. Bloomington: Indiana University Press.
- McGillivray, Alice V.; Scammon, Richard M. (1994). America at the Polls, 1960–1992: Kennedy to Clinton; A Handbook of American Presidential Election Statistics. Washington, D.C.: Congressional Quarterly.
- Simcox, Edwin J. (1980). 1980 Election Report State of Indiana. Indianapolis: Indiana Secretary of State.
