= Tom Leatherwood =

American politician (born 1956)

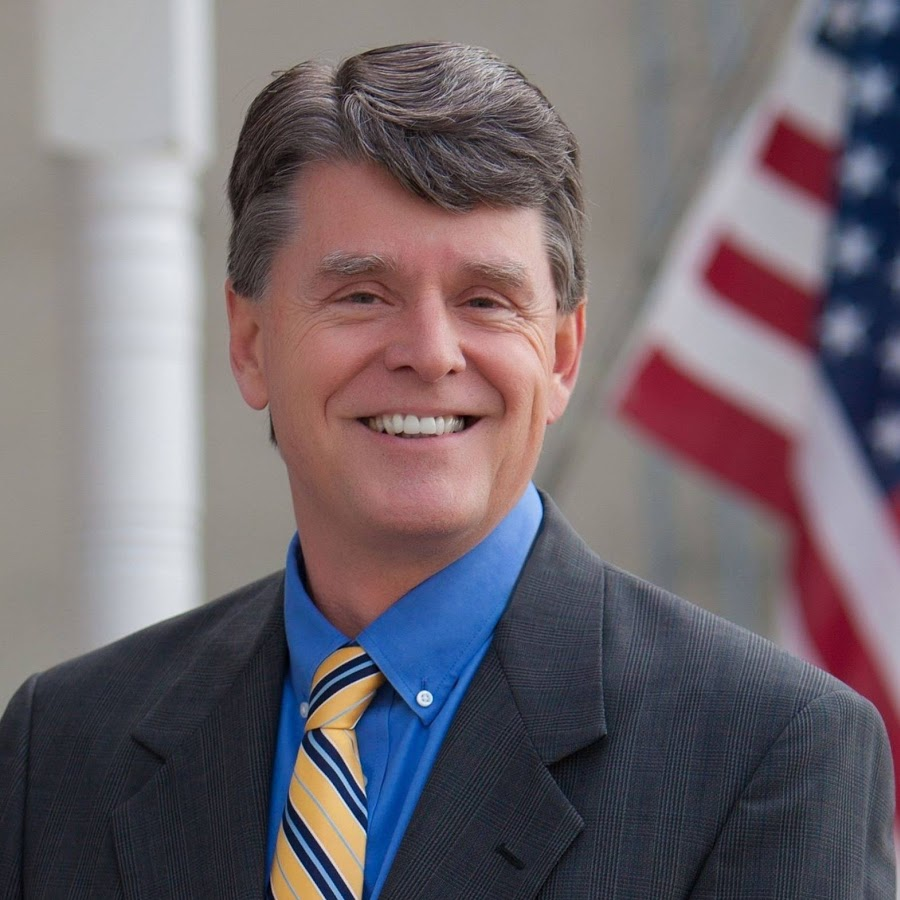
- Leatherwood in 2020

Member of the Tennessee House of Representatives from the 99th district
- Incumbent
- Assumed office January 8, 2019
- Preceded by: Ron Lollar

Member of the Tennessee Senate from the 32nd district
- In office January 12, 1993 – January 9, 2001
- Preceded by: Leonard Dunavant
- Succeeded by: Mark Norris

Personal details
- Born: August 20, 1956 (age 70) Germantown, Tennessee, U.S.
- Party: Republican
- Spouse: Melissa
- Children: 5
- Education: University of Memphis (BS); Middle Tennessee State University
- Occupation: Politician; schoolteacher
- Website: House website

Tom Leatherwood (born August 20, 1956) is an American politician serving in the Tennessee House of Representatives from the 99th district since 2019. He is a member of the Republican Party. The 99th district includes the Northeast part of Shelby County, Tennessee, including the Town of Arlington, City of Lakeland, City of Millington, parts of North and East Bartlett, and unincorporated Northeast Shelby County. Leatherwood previously represented the 32nd district in the Tennessee Senate.

In 2023, Leatherwood supported a resolution to expel three Democratic lawmakers from the legislature for violating decorum rules. The expulsion was widely characterized as unprecedented.

== Background and education ==
Leatherwood was born in Memphis, Tennessee on August 20, 1956. Leatherwood graduated from the University of Memphis with a BS in geology in 1979. After graduation, he worked in the oil exploration industry. He decided to backpack through 25 countries around the world. His trip lasted fourteen months. After returning from the backpacking trip, he decided to become a teacher. He received his teaching certificate from Middle Tennessee State University. He then taught high school in Millington, TN for eight years.

He is married to Melissa and has five daughters.

== Political history ==
=== Tennessee State Senate ===
In 1992, Leatherwood challenged popular Republican Senator Leonard Dunavant for the Tennessee Senate in the 32nd district. According to the Nashville News, "Leatherwood said he ran against Dunavant simply because Dunavant sponsored a bill to impose a state income tax during former Gov. Ned McWherter’s administration."

Leatherwood was the victor in the election and attributes much of the success due to his opposing of the income tax in the state.

Though he ran on defeating the state income tax, people closely involved with the movement were very skeptical of his real motives. Steve Gill, a leader in the anti-tax movement was quoted as saying,

"I don't know him. Don't know that I have ever met him. And if he was fighting AGAINST the state income tax during the Sundquist years it is news to me. He was apparently one of those guys hiding in back rooms meeting with the advocates of an income tax trying to find a "middle ground" as I recall. Those were the Republicans that were secretly BACKING the tax, not opposing it. If he can't be honest about that little piece of history, I have a hard time believing anything else he is saying. When he appeared on the show a while back he actually attacked the tax protesters who really did stop the income tax as being "out of control" and essentially unnecessary to the process. If the protesters had not been there, Tennessee would have a state income tax...thanks to guys like Tom Leatherwood."

In 2014, Tennessee passed a Constitutional Amendment banning the state income tax. The amendment was sponsored by Senator Brian Kelsey (Republican - District 31) and Representative Glen Casada (Republican - District 63).

=== Shelby County Register of Deeds ===
After leaving the Tennessee Senate in 2000, Leatherwood set his sights on the Shelby County Assessor's Office. He narrowly lost to Democrat Rita Clark in a four-way race.

Soon after his defeat, Leatherwood decided to run in a special election for the Shelby County Register of Deeds. Longtime Register of Deeds, Guy Bates, died while in office. This created a special election in November 2000.

Leatherwood held the Register of Deeds position for 18 years. He won re-election in 2002, 2006, 2010, and 2014. In 2010, term limits (two terms) became effective and Leatherwood was unable to run for Register of Deeds again in 2018.

Because of the term limits, he decided to run for Shelby County Circuit Court Clerk in the 2018 election cycle. He won the Republican primary but lost the general election to the Democrat, Temiika Gipson.

==== Archiving problems at Register's Office ====
In 2005, Leatherwood approached the State Legislature and lobbied to have the law on archiving records changed. The Senate Bill was SB1753 and was sponsored by Senator Curtis Person. The House Bill was HB2064 and sponsored by Representative Beverly Marrero and co-sponsored by Representative Tre Hargett. The House conformed to SB1753 and it was assigned Public Chapter Number 144 by the Secretary of State.

In 2019, newly elected Register of Deeds, Shelandra Ford, made an unexpected announcement about the archiving of records in Shelby County. In a letter to clerks and other officials she stated, "the previous records retention, maintenance and pulling of records by my office for other elected officials, judges and or the public will cease 30 calendar days from receipt of this letter." In the same letter, Ford stated that the problem was one of "critical issue of the storage, maintenance and records retention."

Soon, she came before the Shelby County Commission and asked to hire new employees to alleviate the backlog of archiving. Initially, the Commission rejected her request. However, during the meeting she told those present that the Register's Office had a nearly 15-year backlog and that Leatherwood had not properly overseen the archiving. She was quoted as saying, "it would take one employee 246 years to scan the backlog of materials from 2005 through 2018. It would take five people 49 years, 10 people 25 years, 20 people 13 years and 50 people five years."

In December 2019, the Shelby County Commission approved $168,412 to hire two full-time employees and three temporary workers.

Ford said that the backlog of archiving was a "catastrophe" and that fixing the problem, "would take years and not be cheap."

In July 2021, the Shelby County Commission was presented with a proposal to fix the archiving problem left by Leatherwood. According to the proposal, there were nearly 80 million documents that were left unarchived. Those documents were divided into "high priority" and "low priority". The number of documents was evenly divided with approximately 38 million in each category.

Two options to fix the archiving problem were listed in the proposal. One option was to outsource the archiving to a private company. The proposal stated that archiving just the high priority items would cost approximately $15 million and take approximately five years.

== Congressional campaigns ==
While Shelby County Register of Deeds, Leatherwood attempted two separate runs for the United States Congress. In 2008, Leatherwood ran for the 7th Congressional District against sitting Republican Congressman Marsha Blackburn. The race became heated when Leatherwood sent a letter to supporters accusing Blackburn of illegally using campaign money and, "talking the talk" but not "walking the walk."

A Collierville, TN resident then made a FEC complaint against Leatherwood. The complaint alleged that, "Leatherwood’s advertisements didn’t have him approving the message in his own voice, didn’t disclose who paid for his yard signs, and didn’t show his campaign’s website as an expense on his campaign disclosure reports."

2008 Republican primary results, 7th Congressional district
| Marsha Blackburn | 62.0% | 30,997 |
| Tom Leatherwood | 38.0% | 19,025 |
| Total votes | | 50,022 |

In 2016, Leatherwood once again decided to run for Congress. After the 2010 Census, Leatherwood's Congressional district changed from the 7th district to the 8th district. Unlike the 2008 race, the 2016 race had a very crowded primary field. Once Congressman Stephen Fincher announced his retirement, the Republican flood gates opened with potential candidates. In all, thirteen candidates were on the Republican primary ballot.

Leatherwood finished a distant 6th with only 4.3% of the vote.

2016 Republican primary results, 8th Congressional district
| David Kustoff | 27.4% | 16,889 |
| George Flinn Jr. | 23.1% | 14,200 |
| Mark Luttrell | 17.7% | 10,878 |
| Brian Kelsey | 12.9% | 7,942 |
| Brad Greer | 11.1% | 6,819 |
| Tom Leatherwood | 4.3% | 2,620 |
| Hunter Baker | 1.6% | 1,014 |
| Ken Atkins | 0.7% | 410 |
| Raymond Honeycutt | 0.4% | 231 |
| George Howell | 0.3% | 211 |
| David Wharton | 0.2% | 131 |
| David Bault | 0.2% | 109 |
| David Maldonado | 0.1% | 76 |
| Total votes | | 61,530 |

== The Educational Savings Account (ESA) controversy ==
In 2019, Governor Bill Lee announced that he would be introducing legislation that created Educational Savings Accounts (a.k.a. school vouchers) in Tennessee. Under his proposal, $7,300 of public money would be provided to parents who unenroll a student from their school district and allow them to use the funds on private school or other education-related expenses. Parents enrolling in the program would get a debit-type card to pay for tuition or other approved expenses.

The bill was controversial from the start. Public school supporters say that using public funds to fund private education undermines the public education system. Pro-voucher supporters believe that parents with children in failing public schools should be able to send their children to private schools using taxpayer money.

Leatherwood, who is a former high school teacher and whose wife is a current elementary school teacher, originally voted against the bill in the House Education Subcommittee. During the subcommittee meeting he said, "I am concerned that having these accounts out there could draw some people who aren't as dedicated or concerned about home schooling as some have been in the past. … It just takes one or two bad cases to tarnish an entity or an institution." Leatherwood was the only Republican on the subcommittee to vote against the bill.

The bill originally affected three counties in Tennessee; Davidson, Knox, and Shelby.

When the bill came to the floor for a vote, the vote total was 49–49. Speaker Glen Casada took the unprecedented step of leaving the vote open for 40-plus minutes. During that time, Speaker Casada and Governor Lee and his staff allegedly attempted to sway no-voters. Members were seen being taken one-by-one onto the patio behind the Speaker's desk. Eventually, Representative Jason Zachary (R-Knoxville) changed his vote with the promise that Knoxville Schools would be removed from the bill.

Leatherwood swapped his vote during the full House Education Committee meeting and voted yes on bill. He also voted yes for the bill during the controversial floor vote. According to The Tennessean, Leatherwood was the recipient of $30,000 in the Governor's amendment budget. However, a pro-public education watchdog group reports that Leatherwood received $110K for sidewalks in Bartlett and $30K for creating a cybersecurity classroom at Arlington High School."

In the end, the Educational Savings Account bill passed by a vote of 50–48.

The FBI and TBI are reportedly investigating alleged bribes and kickbacks in return for voting yes on the bill.

=== Controversial airplane ride ===
Several months after the controversial vote on Educational Savings Accounts, the Republican Party of Shelby County held their annual Lincoln Day Gala. Governor Bill Lee was scheduled to be the Keynote Speaker. Also on that day, the Tennessee General Assembly held a special meeting to replace Speaker Glen Casada after he was embroiled in several scandals.

Only two Republican Representatives in Shelby County voted for the ESA Bill; Tom Leatherwood and Mark White (R-Germantown). Attention was brought upon the pair when they arrived via airplane with Governor Lee. No other Shelby County Representatives or Senators were on board the airplane.

== Marriage bill controversy ==
As a member of the 112th General Assembly, Representative Leatherwood sponsored HB 0233. The companion bill in the Senate, SB 562, was sponsored by Senator Janice Bowling. The bill's caption text stated, "As introduced, deletes statutes on marriage licensing and ceremonies; limits the jurisdiction of circuit courts and chancery courts in cases involving the definition of common law marriage to the principles of common law marriage."

During a Children and Family Affairs Subcommittee meeting Representative Leatherwood stated, “So, all this bill does is give an alternative form of marriage for those pastors and other individuals who have a conscientious objection to the current pathway to marriage in our law." Later in the hearing he admitted, “There is not an explicit age limit."

Representative Mike Stewart (D-Nashville) stated during the hearing, "I don’t think any normal person thinks we shouldn’t have an age requirement for marriage."

News of the omission of a specific age limit spread fast. Major news outlets around the world reported that bill would allow child marriage in Tennessee. Major news outlets such as Newsweek, NBC News and many others reported on the bill.

After worldwide condemnation and backlash, Senator Janice Bowling amended SB 562 to say, "One (1) man and one (1) woman, if both have attained the age of majority, may file with the office of the county clerk in the county in which one (1) of the parties to the marital contract resides a document entitled "Record of Marital Contract at Common Law."

When asked in a later committee hearing, Leatherwood stated that, "Yes, I am opposed to child marriages."

The bill also upset gay rights activists. Dakota Galban said the bill, "Does not come from a place of kindness and understanding but rather a place of prejudice and contempt."

Republican Representative Johnny Garrett (R-Goodlettsville) also highlighted another problem with the bill. He inferred that since this bill allowed people to get married without a license, it also legalized bigamy and polygamy in Tennessee. Garrett said, "We’re going to legalize bigamy in this state."

== Committee and Subcommittee assignments ==
- Vice-Chair, Health Committee
- Member, Government Operations Committee of 1st Extraordinary Session
- Member, Naming & Designating Committee
- Member, State & Local Government Committee
- Member, Transportation Committee of 1st Extraordinary Session
- Member, Elections & Campaign Finance Subcommittee
- Member, Health Subcommittee

== Memberships ==
- National Rifle Association of America
- Mid-America Baptist Theological Seminary Development Council
- Republican Party of Shelby County
- Northeast Shelby Republican Club
