= Tennessee House of Representatives 99th district =

State legislative district in Tennessee

Tennessee's 99th State House of Representatives district
- Map of Tennessee House districts with the 99th District shaded in red
Representative
Tom Leatherwood; R–Bellevue
- Demographics: 69.9% White; 17.9% Black; 5.9% Hispanic; 3.1% Asian; 0.2% Other; 3% Multiracial
- Population (2024): 72,503

The Tennessee House of Representatives 99th district is one of 99 legislative districts in the Tennessee House of Representatives. The district represents northeastern Shelby County. It includes the cities Bartlett, Lakeland, Millington, Arlington. It has been represented by former state senator Tom Leatherwood since 2019.

== Demographics ==
The Tennessee Comptroller estimates the population as of 2024 at 69,371.

- 69.9% of the district is White
- 17.9% of the district is African American
- 5.9% of the district is Hispanic
- 3.1% of the district is Asian
- 0.2% of the district is some other race
- 3% of the district is Two or more races

Detailed demographic information is available through Census Reporter as well.

== List of representatives ==
Representative	Party	Years of service	General Assembly	Residence
Tom Leatherwood	Republican	2019–present	111th-114th	Arlington
Ron Lollar	Republican	2007–2018	105th-111th	Bartlett
William C. "Bubba" Pleasant	Republican	1997-2006	100th-104th	Arlington
Dan R. Byrd	Democratic	1983–1996	93rd-99th	Bartlett
Harold W. Byrd	Democratic	1977–1982	90th-92nd	Memphis
James E. "Chick" Hendren	Republican	1973–1976	88th-89th	Memphis

== Electoral history ==
=== 2024 ===
2024 Tennessee House of Representatives election, District 99
Party	Candidate	Votes	%
Republican	Tom Leatherwood (incumbent)	25,259	75.32
Independent	William P. Mouzon	8,275	24.68
Total votes		33,534	100.00

=== 2022 ===
2022 Tennessee House of Representatives election, District 99
Party	Candidate	Votes	%
Republican	Tom Leatherwood (incumbent)	17,374	100.00
Total votes		17,374	100.00

=== 2020 ===
2020 Tennessee House of Representatives election, District 99
Party	Candidate	Votes	%
Republican	Tom Leatherwood (Incumbent)	28,046	100.00
Total votes			

=== 2018 ===
2018 Tennessee House of Representatives election, District 99
Party	Candidate	Votes	%
Republican	Tom Leatherwood	18,644	70.26
Democratic	David Cambron	7,893	29.74
Total votes		26,537	100.00

=== 2016 ===
2016 Tennessee House of Representatives election, District 99
Party	Candidate	Votes	%
Republican	Ron Lollar (incumbent)	22,874	100.00
Total votes		22,874	100.00

=== 2014 ===
2014 Tennessee House of Representatives election, District 99
Party	Candidate	Votes	%
Republican	Ron Lollar (incumbent)	14,131	100.00
Total votes		14,131	100.00

=== 2012 ===
2012 Tennessee House of Representatives election, District 99
Party	Candidate	Votes	%
Republican	Ron Lollar (Incumbent)	22,968	100.00
Total votes		22,968	100.00

=== 2010 ===
2010 Tennessee House of Representatives election, District 99
Party	Candidate	Votes	%
Republican	Ron Lollar (incumbent)	18,438	100.00
Total votes		18,438	100.00

=== 2008 ===
2008 Tennessee House of Representatives election, District 99
Party	Candidate	Votes	%
Republican	Ron Lollar	24,882	100.00
Total votes		24,882	100.00

=== 2006 ===
2006 Tennessee House of Representatives election, District 99
Party	Candidate	Votes	%
Republican	William C. Pleasant (Incumbent)	14,146	100.00
Total votes		14,176	100.00

=== 2004 ===
2004 Tennessee House of Representatives election, District 99
Party	Candidate	Votes	%
Republican	W. C. "Bubba" Pleasant (Incumbent)	22,032	100.00
Total votes		22,032	100.00

=== 2002 ===
2002 Tennessee House of Representatives election, District 99
Party	Candidate	Votes	%
Republican	W. C. "Bubba" Pleasant (Incumbent)	14,532	99.70
Write-in		45	0.3
Total votes		14,577	100.00

=== 2000 ===
2000 Tennessee House of Representatives election, District 99
Party	Candidate	Votes	%
Republican	W. C. "Bubba" Pleasant (Incumbent)	16,339	99.80
Write-in		32	0.20
Total votes		16,371	100.00
