= Dunavant =

Dunavant is a surname. Notable people with the surname include:

- D. Michael Dunavant (born 1970), American lawyer
- Leonard Dunavant (1919–1995), American businessman and politician
- William Dunavant (1932–2021), American industrialist
