= Mark Norris (judge) =

American judge (born 1955)

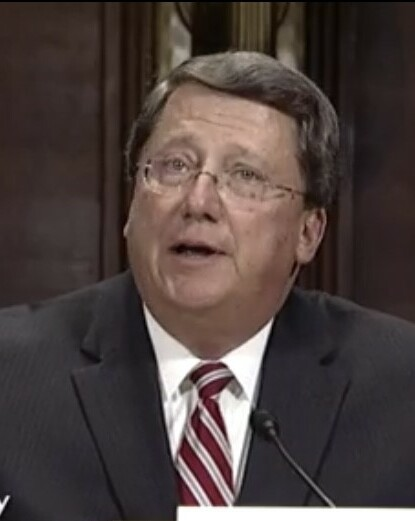

Judge of the United States District Court for the Western District of Tennessee
- Incumbent
- Assumed office November 8, 2018
- Appointed by: Donald Trump
- Preceded by: J. Daniel Breen

Majority Leader of the Tennessee Senate
- In office January 9, 2007 – November 1, 2018
- Preceded by: Ron Ramsey
- Succeeded by: Jack Johnson

Member of the Tennessee Senate from the 32nd district
- In office January 2001 – November 1, 2018
- Preceded by: Tom Leatherwood
- Succeeded by: Paul Rose

Personal details
- Born: Mark Saalfield Norris Sr. 1955 (age 70–71) Akron, Ohio, U.S.
- Party: Republican
- Education: Colorado College (BA); University of Denver (JD)

Mark Saalfield Norris Sr. (born 1955) is a United States district judge of the United States District Court for the Western District of Tennessee. He served as a Republican member of the Tennessee Senate from 2001 through 2018, serving as Majority Leader from 2007 to 2018.

== Education and career ==
Norris received his Bachelor of Arts from Colorado College, and his Juris Doctor from the University of Denver Sturm College of Law. From 1980 to 2006, Norris practiced law at Armstrong Allen. Before becoming a judge, Norris was senior counsel at Adams and Reese in Memphis. In 1994, Norris was elected to the Shelby County Commission. He served on that body until 2000.

== Tennessee Senate ==
Norris was first elected to represent District 32 in the Tennessee Senate in 2000. The District is composed of Dyer, Lauderdale, and Tipton counties, and the eastern and northeastern portion of Shelby County. While in the Senate Norris was an active member in the American Legislative Exchange Council (ALEC), having attended meetings of the organization. In 2002, Norris ran to represent Tennessee's 7th congressional district in the United States House of Representatives, but lost the primary to Marsha Blackburn. He did not have to give up his Senate seat to run for Congress; Tennessee state senators serve staggered four-year terms, and Norris was not up for reelection until 2004.

He was elected the State Senate Majority Leader in 2007.

In 2015, Norris opposed a proposal to make the Bible the official state book.

Norris ran unopposed for re-election in 2016, collecting $655,000 in campaign contributions, the largest among all Tennessee General Assembly candidates.

Norris engaged in an effort to bar refugee resettlement in Tennessee and was a lead figure supporting a lawsuit challenging the constitutionality of the U.S. Refugee Resettlement Program. Norris created an online petition against refugee resettlement under the headline "Don't let potential terrorists come to Tennessee." Norris also supported the Trump travel bans.

Norris resigned from the state senate on November 1, 2018, after being confirmed to the district court.

== Federal judicial service ==
=== Confirmation process ===
On July 13, 2017, President Donald Trump nominated Norris to the United States District Court for the Western District of Tennessee, to the seat vacated by Judge J. Daniel Breen, who assumed senior status on March 18, 2017. Prior to his nomination, Norris was publicly considering a candidacy for Governor of Tennessee in 2018.

Trump's nomination of Norris was supported by Republican Senators Lamar Alexander and Bob Corker of Tennessee. Norris' nomination was opposed by former U.S. District Judge Shira Scheindlin, an appointee of Bill Clinton, who wrote a New York Times opinion editorial in which she described Norris as one of a number of "the least qualified and most bizarre" of Trump's judicial appointments.

On November 1, 2017, a hearing on his nomination was held before the Senate Judiciary Committee. During the hearing, Norris said in response to a question from Senator Amy Klobuchar that he viewed the case Obergefell v. Hodges (determining that same-sex couples have a constitutional right to marry) as settled law. On December 7, 2017, his nomination was reported out of committee by an 11–9 vote.

On January 3, 2018, his nomination was returned to the President under Rule XXXI, Paragraph 6 of the United States Senate. On January 5, 2018, President Donald Trump announced his intent to renominate Norris to a federal judgeship. On January 8, 2018, his renomination was sent to the Senate. On January 18, 2018, his nomination was reported out of committee by a 11–10 vote. On January 10, 2018, Norris said he was unsure if he would be confirmed to the judgeship by the U.S. Senate and planned to remain in the state legislature until his nomination was ultimately confirmed. Then-U.S. Senator Lamar Alexander published an editorial in The Commercial Appeal on October 5, 2018, denouncing the delay in Norris' confirmation stating Norris would "serve Tennesseans with integrity and in a fair and impartial manner." On October 11, 2018, his nomination was confirmed by a 51–44 vote. He received his judicial commission on November 8, 2018.

When Norris took the public oath of office at his investiture, Tennessee Supreme Court Justice Holly M. Kirby spoke highly of Norris' time as Tennessee's Senate Majority Leader and advised lawyers to enter Judge Norris' courtroom prepared by stating, "Judges often take many years to develop that crucial ability to hear faulty logic, questionable evidence, inconsistency, and flaws analysis. But Judge Norris comes to the courtroom having already developed those skills from his many years as Senator Norris, asking tough questions and making hard decisions." U.S. Senator Lamar Alexander, U.S. Representative David Kustoff, Tennessee Governor Bill Haslam, and Tennessee Bar Association President Jason Pannu, among others, spoke at Norris' investiture.

=== Tenure ===
According to Bloomberg Law's litigation analytics, as of August 2025, Norris has the highest affirmation rate in the Western District of Tennessee from the 6th Circuit Court of Appeals with 83.3% of appeals affirmed, 11.1% reversed, and 5.6% affirmed/reversed in part.

Norris has had several notable cases since taking the bench, including a unanimous ruling by a three-judge panel from the 6th Circuit Court of Appeals agreeing with Norris that the Centers for Disease Control and Prevention (CDC) exceeded its authority when the agency temporarily halted evictions amid the COVID-19 pandemic. In July 2024, Norris ruled a woman's political yard sign containing profanity that read "F*** 'Em Both 2024" was protected First Amendment speech.

On May 17, 2025, Norris was honored by the Tennessee Wildlife Federation when he received the Z. Carter Patten Award accompanied by a press release from the federation reading, "Judge Norris has championed conservation through decades of public service -- as an attorney, senator and now federal judge. He helped lead the passage of the Right to Hunt and Fish amendment and chaired statewide and local bodies focused on land use, water and natural resources . . . Judge Norris has remained committed to protecting Tennessee's natural heritage throughout his distinguished career."

== See also ==
- Donald Trump judicial appointment controversies

Tennessee Senate
Preceded by Tom Leatherwood	Member of the Tennessee Senate from the 32nd district 2001–2018	Succeeded by Paul Rose
Preceded by Ron Ramsey	Majority Leader of the Tennessee Senate; 2007–2018	Succeeded by Jack Johnson
Party political offices
Preceded by Ron Ramsey	Republican Leader of the Tennessee Senate; 2007–2018	Succeeded by Jack Johnson
Legal offices
Preceded by J. Daniel Breen	Judge of the United States District Court for the Western District of Tennessee; 2018–present	Incumbent
