= Paul Rose (American politician) =

American politician

Member of the Tennessee Senate from the 32nd district
- Incumbent
- Assumed office March 12, 2019
- Preceded by: Mark Norris

Personal details
- Party: Republican
- Spouse: Nancy Rose (m. 1972)
- Children: 3
- Education: University of Tennessee at Martin (BA)

Paul Rose is an American politician and businessman who is a Republican member of the Tennessee Senate. He has represented District 32, which includes Tipton County and part of Shelby County, since March 12, 2019.

== Background ==
Rose joined his family's company, Rose Construction, in 1974 and later went on to become president of the company.

== 2019 elections ==
2019 Republican Primary District 32
Candidates	Votes Obtained	%
Paul Rose	6,398	60.3
George Chism	1,530	14.4
Heidi Shafer	1,520	14.3
Steve McManus	1,157	10.9
Total	10,605	100

2019 General Election District 32
Candidates	Party	Votes Obtained	%
Paul Rose	Republican	9,149	84.0
Eric Coleman	Democrat	1,746	16.0
Total		10,895	100

== Current legislative committees ==
Position	Committee
Vice-Chair	Commerce, Labor, Transportation and Agriculture Subcommittee of Joint Government Operations Committee
Member	Senate Energy, Agriculture and Natural Resources Committee
Member	Senate Government Operations Committee
Member	Education, Health, and General Welfare Subcommittee of Joint Government Operations Committee

== Civic memberships ==
Position	Organization
Senate Member	111th General Assembly
Member (Board of Directors)	Boys and Girls Club of the Hatchie River Region
Member (Former Chairman) (Board of Trustees)	Tennessee Baptist Children's Home
Member	Dyersburg State Community College Foundation Board
Member	First Baptist Church in Covington
Member	National Rifle Association
