= Jack Johnson (American politician) =

American politician (born 1968)

Majority Leader of the Tennessee Senate
- Incumbent
- Assumed office January 8, 2019
- Preceded by: Mark Norris

Member of the Tennessee Senate
- Incumbent
- Assumed office January 9, 2007
- Preceded by: Jim Bryson
- Constituency: 23rd district (2007–2023); 27th district (2023–present)

Personal details
- Born: July 25, 1968 (age 58) Amarillo, Texas, U.S.
- Party: Republican
- Education: Texas State University, San Marcos (BS)

Jack Johnson (born July 25, 1968) is an American politician and a Republican Party member of the Tennessee Senate for the 27th district, which is composed of Williamson County.

== Early life and education ==
Born in Amarillo, Texas, Johnson graduated from Texas State University with a Bachelor of Science degree in Education. Johnson is married to Deanna Carol Bell Johnson and they have three children.

== Career ==
Johnson is Vice President of public relations for Takl Inc., which is the company owning a smartphone app reportedly described as being the "“Uber for odd jobs" and as an "on-demand mobile platform that connects self-employed providers with users who need chores and small jobs completed". Johnson received ownership of LFGS, LLC (d.b.a. Leipers Fork Market) from his wife Deanna and Johnson is still reporting LFGS, LLC as both a source of income (along with income from DoorDash and MAFIAoZA'S pizzeria and neighborhood pub) and as an investment on his 2021 Statement of Disclosure of Interests form.

In March 2006, Johnson was identified as a delegate of the Southern Republican Leadership Conference.

=== Tennessee Senate ===
Jack Johnson was elected to the Tennessee General Assembly Senate in November 2006, after incumbent Jim Bryson had decided to run for governor. He is the Assistant Floor Leader of the Republican Caucus, the Chair of the Joint State & Local Subcommittee of Government Operations, the Secretary of the Senate Transportation Committee, and the Vice Chair of the Joint Education Subcommittee of Government Operations. He serves on the following committees: Senate Government Operations Committee, Senate General Welfare and Human Resources Committee, Joint Select Oversight Committee on Corrections, Joint Transportation Study Committee, Charitable Gaming Oversight Committee, and Study Commission on Methods of Restraint for Special Education Students.

==== Nathan Bedford Forrest bust controversy ====
Johnson defended keeping the controversial bust of the Confederate Lt. General and first Ku Klux Klan Grand Wizard Nathan Bedford Forrest prominently displayed on the second floor of the Tennessee General Assembly building in Nashville, voting twice on separate occasions as a member of the State Capitol Commission against relocating the NBF to the nearby Tennessee State Museum for permanent display.

== Personal life ==
Johnson's wife, Deanna Bell Johnson, is a 1991 graduate of the Roman Catholic DePaul University College of Law of Chicago, Illinois and was appointed as 21st Judicial District Circuit Court Judge in November 2014 by Tennessee Governor Bill Haslam to fill the office that was vacated when Judge Tim Easter was appointed to the Tennessee Court of Criminal Appeals. Deanna Johnson later won her first countywide election in Williamson County during 2016 and will likely be a candidate for re-election in 2022.

Tennessee Senate
| Preceded by Mark Norris | Majority Leader of the Tennessee Senate; 2019–present | Incumbent |
