= Tennessee's 32nd Senate district =

American legislative district

Tennessee's 32nd State Senate district
Senator
Paul Rose; R–Covington
- Demographics: 58% White; 32% Black; 6% Hispanic; 1% Asian; 3% Multiracial
- Population (2022): 204,017

Tennessee's 32nd Senate district is one of 33 districts in the Tennessee Senate. It has been represented by Republican Paul Rose since a 2019 special election to replace fellow Republican Mark Norris.

== Geography ==
District 32 is based in the eastern and northern suburbs of Memphis in Shelby as well as Lauderdale and Tipton Counties, covering parts of Memphis proper as well as Covington, Atoka, Munford, and most of Bartlett.

The district is located almost entirely within Tennessee's 8th congressional district, with a small section extending into the 9th district. It overlaps with the 81st, 83rd, 88th, 95th, 97th, 98th, and 99th districts of the Tennessee House of Representatives, and borders the states of Mississippi and Arkansas.

== Recent election results ==
Tennessee Senators are elected to staggered four-year terms, with odd-numbered districts holding elections in midterm years and even-numbered districts holding elections in presidential years.

=== 2020 ===
2020 Tennessee Senate election, District 32
Primary election
Party	Candidate	Votes	%
Republican	Paul Rose (incumbent)	17,288	76.4
Republican	Scott Throckmorton	5,339	23.6
Total votes		22,627	100
General election
Republican	Paul Rose (incumbent)	70,649	69.1
Democratic	Julie Byrd Ashworth	31,571	30.9
Total votes		102,220	100
Republican hold			

=== 2019 special ===
In 2018, incumbent Mark Norris was appointed as a United States District Judge for the Western District of Tennessee, triggering a special election to replace him in March 2019.

2019 Tennessee Senate special election, District 32
Primary election
Party	Candidate	Votes	%
Republican	Paul Rose	6,398	60.3
Republican	George Chism	1,530	14.4
Republican	Heidi Shafer	1,520	14.3
Republican	Steve McManus	1,157	10.9
Total votes		10,605	100
General election
Republican	Paul Rose	9,149	84.0
Democratic	Eric Coleman	1,746	16.0
Total votes		10,895	100
Republican hold			

=== 2016 ===
2016 Tennessee Senate election, District 32
Party	Candidate	Votes	%
Republican	Mark Norris (incumbent)	57,912	100
Total votes		57,912	100
Republican hold			

=== 2012 ===
2012 Tennessee Senate election, District 32
Primary election
Party	Candidate	Votes	%
Republican	Mark Norris (incumbent)	26,592	88.9
Republican	Woody Degan	3,319	11.1
Total votes		29,911	100
General election
Republican	Mark Norris (incumbent)	69,818	100
Total votes		69,818	100
Republican hold			

=== Federal and statewide results ===
Year	Office	Results
2020	President	Trump 65.4 – 33%
2016	President	Trump 68.1 – 28.4%
2012	President	Romney 71.1 – 27.9%
2012	Senate	Corker 75.0 – 22.0%
