= Ron Lollar =

American politician (1948–2018)

Member of the Tennessee House of Representatives from the 99th district
- In office January 9, 2007 – July 6, 2018
- Preceded by: W. C. Pleasant
- Succeeded by: Tom Leatherwood

Personal details
- Born: August 13, 1948 Jackson, Tennessee, U.S.
- Died: July 6, 2018 (aged 69) Bartlett, Tennessee, U.S.
- Party: Republican
- Spouse: Brenda
- Children: 3
- Education: Jackson State Community College; Austin Peay State University (BS)
- Occupation: Politician; manager; marine

Military service
- Allegiance: United States
- Branch/service: United States Marines
- Years of service: 1967 – 1971

Ron Lollar (August 13, 1948 – July 6, 2018) was an American politician and a Republican member of the Tennessee House of Representatives for the 99th district, which encompasses part of Shelby County.

== Biography ==
Lollar was born on August 13, 1948, in Jackson, Tennessee. He graduated from Jackson State Community College with an associate degree in 1973, where he was president of the Student Body Association. In 1975, he graduated from Austin Peay State University with a Bachelor of Science, where he was also president of the Student Government Association. He served in the U.S. Marine Corps from 1967 to 1971, and in the Army National Guard from 1980 until 1982. He was a staff sergeant as a ceremonial White House guard. He has received the Vietnam Gallantry Cross, the Navy Commendation Medal w/ "V" device, a Combat Action Ribbon with a Navy Unit citation, a Good Conduct Medal, a Meritorious Unit Citation, a Vietnamese Service Medal, and a Vietnamese Campaign Medal.

Lollar served as a state representative since being elected to the 105th Tennessee General Assembly (2007–2008). He served on the House Agriculture Committee, the House Education Committee, the House Higher Education Subcommittee, and the House Special Iniatiives Subcommittee. For three terms, he represented the second district on the Shelby County School Board.

Lollar served on the Shelby County School Board. In 2004, Lollar was a member of the Tennessee School Board Association, a representative agency for members of Tennessee's school boards. In 2006, he was a member of the Tennessee School Board Association's board of directors. He was a Tennessee State School Board Association panel moderator until his death. In 2006, he was Chair of the Tennessee Legislative Network. He served as President of Future Farmers of America. He was also a member of the American Legislative Exchange Council (ALEC).

Lollar served as a Baptist deacon and was a member of Gideons International. He was also a Freemason. He lived in Bartlett, Tennessee, and was married with three children. He also had two godsons.

Lollar died on July 6, 2018, from a heart attack.

Preceded by W. C. Pleasant	Tennessee State Representative, 99th District; 2007–2018	Succeeded by Tom Leatherwood
