= Tom Hoefling =

American activist and politician (born 1960)

Personal details
- Born: Thomas Conrad Hoefling; December 20, 1960 (age 65) Omaha, Nebraska, U.S.
- Party: America's (before 2013; 2016–2019); Republican (2013–2016; 2019–present)
- Other political affiliations: American Independent (2012; 2016); Constitution (2016)
- Spouse: Siena Stone
- Children: 11

Thomas Conrad Hoefling (born December 20, 1960) is an American activist and politician, who was the founder and national chairman of America's Party. Hoefling was the party's 2012 and 2016 presidential nominee, after seeking the nomination of the Constitution and American Independent parties. Currently a member of the Republican Party, Hoefling has served as political director for Alan Keyes' political group America's Revival and as a representative for the American Conservative Coalition.

== Career ==
=== Presidential campaigns (2012, 2016) ===
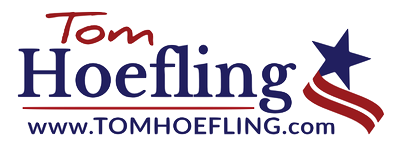
Tom Hoefling

In August 2012, the ballot-qualified American Independent Party nominated Hoefling as its candidate for president of the U.S.

Hoefling was on the ballot in California, Colorado, and Florida. He was filed as a qualified write-in candidate in Alaska, Connecticut, Delaware, Illinois, Indiana, Kentucky, Michigan, Montana, Ohio, Texas, and West Virginia. Hoefling received 40,624 votes in the general election, or 0.03%, coming in eighth place nationally out of 27 candidates who were on the ballot in at least one state.

==== 2020 ====
Hoefling appeared on the ballot in Maryland for the 2020 United States presidential election. During the 2020 election, Hoefling received attention when The Salt Lake Tribune compared his campaign to Kanye West's 2020 effort to appear on the ballot in Utah, as Hoefling centered his campaign against "the abortion holocaust" and describing himself as a "no compromise" pro-life candidate.

=== Iowa gubernatorial campaign (2013) ===
In December 2013, Hoefling announced his bid for the Republican nomination for governor of Iowa in the 2014 election. He lost the nomination to incumbent Republican Governor Terry Branstad.

== Positions ==
=== Donald Trump ===
Donald Trump is not the greatest man in the world. In fact, he is the worst man in the world. He is the worst man, by far, to ever step foot onto the public stage in America. No one else is even close.

— Tom Hoefling

Hoefling has vehemently denounced Donald Trump and Trumpist Republicans due to their involvement in the January 6 United States Capitol attack, comparing Trump to tyrants such as King George III and calling him "the exact opposite of George Washington." Hoefling stated that Joe Biden "clearly" beat Trump in the 2020 United States Presidential election and called on the United States Senate to convict Donald Trump and bar him from ever holding public office again. Prior to this Hoefling supported the Second impeachment of Donald Trump and called for the immediate removal of Trump from public office. Before this in 2019 Hoefling attacked Trump for making border security a dirty topic preventing any meaningful attempts to secure the U.S.-Mexico border.

Hoefling's opposition to Trump can be traced back to the 2016 Republican Party presidential primaries when he highlighted Trump's 2000 bid for president and denounced him as a liberal and that "Trump Republicans are for all practical purposes liberals, no matter what they say." He also called efforts by Republicans to promote Trump as the lesser of two evils between Hillary Clinton as "impractical" and called Trump "crass" "unprincipled" and accused him of being a "liberal friend" and "financial backer" of Clinton. After Trump was named the nominee he called all his campaign points "false promises" specifically targeting his pro-capital punishment stance, and his ambiguous position on abortion.

=== Conspiracy theories ===
==== ACLU ====
Following the 2012 decision in Parents, Families, & Friends of Lesbians & Gays, Inc. v. Camdenton R-III School District, Hoefling denounced the American Civil Liberties Union (ACLU) for its advocacy against filters blocking LGBT supportive content and viewpoints in public high-school libraries, claiming that disabling filters for safe sites would allow access to sexually explicit content. Hoefling wrote in his blog in support of Rick Santorum's 2012 bid for president and stated that gay porn is not constitutionally protected free speech.

== Personal life ==
Hoefling is married to Siena Stone Hoefling.

Party political offices
Preceded by Alan Keyes	America's Party nominee for president of the United States; 2012, 2016	Most recent
Preceded by Alan Keyes	American Independent Party nominee for president of the United States; 2012	Succeeded by Donald Trump
Preceded by Diane Templin	American Party nominee for president of the United States; 2016	Most recent
