= Thomas J. Anderson (author) =

Columnist, farmer, editor and publisher

Thomas Anderson
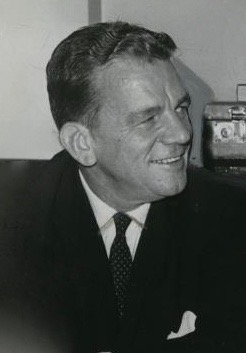
- Anderson in 1962

Personal details
- Born: November 10, 1910 Nashville, Tennessee, U.S.
- Died: August 30, 2002 (aged 91) Raleigh, North Carolina, U.S.
- Party: American Independent (1972–1976); American (1976–1978)
- Spouse: Carolyn Montague Jennings
- Children: Carol
- Education: Vanderbilt University (BA)

Thomas Jefferson Anderson (November 10, 1910 – August 30, 2002) was an American author, journalist, and farmer. He was the American Independent Party vice presidential nominee under John G. Schmitz in 1972 and the American Party presidential nominee in 1976.

== Early life ==
Thomas Jefferson Anderson was born in Nashville, Tennessee; the second of five children of William Joseph and Nancy Lou Anderson. After graduating from Baylor School in Chattanooga, Tennessee, Anderson attended Vanderbilt University in Nashville, where he received a Bachelor of Arts in economics in 1934. At Vanderbilt, he excelled in athletics, earning varsity letters as a member of both the varsity tennis and track teams. He was business editor of the school's yearbook, The Commodore, and served on the student newspaper staff. Anderson was elected president of his fraternity, Phi Delta Theta.

In 1936, he married the former Carolyn Montague Jennings of Franklin, Tennessee. Miss Jennings, also a graduate of Vanderbilt University, was elected "Miss Vanderbilt" during her senior year.

After graduation, he sold securities for several Nashville-based brokerage firms, including J. C. Bradford & Company, and also worked as an ad-salesman for the Southern Agriculturist. He was a veteran of World War II, having served as a lieutenant in the U.S. Navy.

== Publishing ==
In 1947, Anderson purchased The Arkansas Farmer, the first of sixteen regional farm magazines he acquired and operated as part of Nashville-based Southern Unit Publications, Inc. Additionally, he became publisher and editor of The Farm and Ranch Magazine, a nationally circulated monthly publication based in Dallas, Texas. Anderson was the supervising editor and author of the column Straight Talk which appeared in the magazines and was reprinted in more than 375 newspapers. In 1957, a series of the columns was reprinted in a book, also titled Straight Talk. He later produced a weekly radio program of the same name. He spent much of his life as a speaker, publisher and writer, crusading for conservative causes. He won numerous patriotic awards including the Liberty Award of the Congress of Freedom and the Freedom Award of Freedoms Foundation at Valley Forge, Pennsylvania.

== Political involvement ==
In 1972, he was the American Independent Party vice presidential nominee, appearing on the ticket with U.S. Representative John G. Schmitz, a former Republican from California. The duo finished third in the popular vote with 1,100,868 votes.

In 1976, he was the American Party's presidential nominee on a ticket with Rufus Shackleford. They finished sixth in the general election with 158,724 votes. The campaign received its best results in Virginia, where Anderson-Shackleford received 16,686 votes. The ticket also finished third in three states: Kentucky, North Dakota and Indiana.

In 1978, Anderson ran as the American Party-endorsed candidate for the U.S. Senate seat in Tennessee, but victory went to Republican Howard Baker, Jr. who won his third and final term in the chamber. Anderson appeared on the ballot as an independent due to state law, which requires a minimal number of signatures to appear as an independent but requires a full party petition consisting of tens of thousands of signatures to appear on the ballot with a party label. He received 45,908 votes.

== Later life ==
Anderson remained active in conservative politics and was widely popular as a speaker, appearing on various TV and radio programs and delivering more than 1,500 speeches between 1947 and 1994. He lived his later years in Gatlinburg, Tennessee and Blowing Rock, North Carolina.

He was known for a great sense of humor: in some circles he was called "a modern-day Will Rogers", in others "the barefoot wit of the John Birch Society". One of his most famous aphorisms was "Politicians are like cockroaches: It's not what they steal and carry away; it's what they fall into and mess up." A colleague of Anderson's wrote: "Tom Anderson is not a common man. He is of the uncommon stock that conceived and created this republic. He is deeply devoted to the principles proclaimed in the U.S. Constitution. Tom Anderson is unaffected, practical and poetic. If you want style and daring with the kick of a Tennessee mule, then Thomas Jefferson Anderson is your man. A smile. A grin. An earnest patriot. A shot of adrenalin in sluggish patriot veins. By example of his life as well as by his word, Tom Anderson has made a permanent contribution to the literature and liberty under law."

Anderson liked to tell the following story: "A farmer was being plagued by a group of wild hogs. He decided to capture them one by one. He built a corral in the woods, leaving an opening for an enclousure. Next he put corn in front of the corral. At first none of the hogs showed any interest. Finally, some of the young ones begin to go up and smell it and then run back to the herd. Finally one on them took an ear of corn and ran back and ate it. Slowly, the other hogs did the same. Each day the farmer put the corn a little closer to the corral with the same results by the hogs. At last he placed the corn inside the corral. As they were inside eating he gradually completed the enclousure, board by board, and the hogs didn't even notice because they were inside eating the free corn. Finally, he finished the gate and locked it. The hogs tried to get out, but he had 'em. FELLOW HOGS, WE'VE BEEN FENCED."

Anderson was a past president of the American Agricultural Editors Association. He and his wife were two of thirteen charter members of St. Paul's Southern Methodist Church in Nashville.

Anderson died on August 30, 2002, in Raleigh, North Carolina. He is interred at the Mount Hope Cemetery in Franklin, Tennessee.

== Bibliography ==
- Straight Talk: the Wit and Wisdom of Tom Anderson (1957)
- Silence Is Not Golden — It's Yellow (1973)
- Drink deeply from the fountain of knowledge. Don't just stand there and gargle. (1970)

Party political offices
| Preceded by Curtis LeMay | American Independent nominee for Vice President of the United States; 1972 | Succeeded by Bill Dyke |
| Preceded by John Schmitz as American Independent nominee | American nominee for President of the United States; 1976 | Succeeded by Percy Greaves |
