= Percy L. Greaves Jr. =

American academic (1906–1984)

Percy Graves

Personal details
- Born: August 24, 1906 Brooklyn, New York City, New York, U.S.
- Died: August 13, 1984 (aged 77) Irvington, New York, U.S.
- Party: Republican (Before 1976); Libertarian (1976–1980); American (1980–1984)
- Spouse: Bettina Bien Greaves
- Education: Syracuse University; Columbia University; New York University

Percy L. Greaves Jr. (August 24, 1906 – August 13, 1984) was an American free-market economist, historian, and presidential candidate.

== Biography ==
Greaves was born in Brooklyn, New York, on August 24, 1906. He received a B.S. in business administration, magna cum laude, from Syracuse University in 1929. He then enrolled in graduate courses in economics at Columbia University and New York University. Greaves became the financial editor and research economist for the United States News from 1934 to 1936. He resigned to take an executive job in Paris; he traveled widely in Europe until he returned to the US in 1938. Back in the States, he took a job directing research and survey activities for the Metropolitan Life Insurance Company and did extensive political research.

From 1943 to 1945, Greaves was Research Director for the Republican National Committee. Greaves later served as Chief of Minority Staff for the 1945–1946 "Joint Congressional Investigation of the Pearl Harbor Attack".

Greaves was the chair of the Constitution Party when it was founded in 1952, but left shortly after, alongside cochair Suzanne Stevenson, after antisemitic remarks were made by party member Upton Close.

He authored several books on economics, including Understanding the Dollar Crisis (1973) and Mises Made Easier (1974). Greaves was a longtime associate and friend of Ludwig von Mises, regularly attending his seminars. Greaves and his wife attended Mises' graduate seminar at the New York University Graduate School of Business Administration each year from 1950 to 1969. He was also a seminar speaker for the Foundation for Economic Education. Greaves served on the Institute for Historical Review (IHR) Editorial Advisory Committee and frequently wrote for IHR's Journal of Historical Review, generally about Pearl Harbor revisionism.

In the 1974 elections, Greaves was an unsuccessful US Senate candidate in New York for the Free Libertarian Party. Murray Rothbard had commented the same year that Greaves "believes in taxation, and ... favors the draft."

Greaves was nominated as the 1980 presidential candidate for the American Party, with Frank L. Varnum as his running mate. They received 6,648 votes. The state parties of Kansas and Minnesota were unhappy with Greaves's moderate stance on abortion and put anti-Greaves tickets on their ballot lines, winning 1,555 and 6,136 votes respectively. Greaves had also sought the nomination of the American Independent Party but was defeated.

Greaves died due to cancer in 1984. He was survived by his wife, three children, and seven grandchildren.

In 2010, Percy's wife completed an unfinished manuscript left behind after his death and it was published posthumously by the Ludwig von Mises Institute as Pearl Harbor: The Seeds and Fruits of Infamy.

== Publications ==
Articles

- "Does Government Spending Bring Prosperity?" The Freeman (February 1955).

Books

- Understanding the Dollar Crisis. Belmont, Mass.: Western Islands (1973). Foreword by Ludwig von Mises.
- Pearl Harbor: The Seeds and Fruits of Infamy. Auburn, Ala.: Ludwig von Mises Institute (2010). Edited by Bettina B. Greaves.
- On the Manipulation of Money and Credit: Three Treatises on Trade-Cycle Theory. Indianapolis: Liberty Fund (2011). Translated, with a foreword, by Bettina Bien Greaves.

Book contributions

- "The Pearl Harbor Investigations" (Chapter 7). In: Perpetual War for Perpetual Peace, by Harry Elmer Barnes. Caldwell, Ida.: Caxton Printers (1953). OCLC 457149.
- "Is Further Intervention a Cure for Prior Intervention?" (Chapter 9). In: On Freedom and Free Enterprise: Essays in Honor of Ludwig von Mises. Edited by Mary Sennholz. New York: D. Van Nostrand (1956), pp. 285–307.LCCN 56-8218.

== See also ==
- American Party (1969)
- Austrian School

Party political offices
Preceded by Thomas Anderson	American nominee for President of the United States; 1980	Succeeded by Frank Shelton
