= American Independent Party =

Political party in the United States

- Chairperson: Victor Marani (CA)
- Vice Chairperson: James Mallamace
- Founders: Bill Shearer; Eileen Knowland Shearer
- Founded: July 8, 1967; 59 years ago
- Split from: Democratic Party; Republican Party
- Headquarters: PO Box 1479. Freedom, California 95019
- Ideology: Ultraconservatism
- Political position: Far-right
- National affiliation: American Independent Party; Historical: Constitution Party (1992 – 2008)
- Slogan: "No North, No South, No East, No West – One Great Nation, Heaven Blessed!"
- California State Senate: 0 / 40
- California State House: 0 / 80

Party flag

Website
- aipca.vote

The American Independent Party (AIP) is an American political party that was established in 1967. The American Independent Party is best known for its nomination of Democratic then-former Governor George Wallace of Alabama, who carried five states in the 1968 presidential election running against Richard Nixon and Hubert Humphrey on a populist, hard-line anti-communist, pro-"law and order" platform, appealing to working-class white voters. Wallace was best known for his staunch segregationist stances. In 1976, the party split into the modern American Independent Party and the American Party. From 1992 until 2008, the party was the California affiliate of the national Constitution Party. Its exit from the Constitution Party led to a leadership dispute during the 2008 election.

== History ==
=== Wallace campaign and early history ===
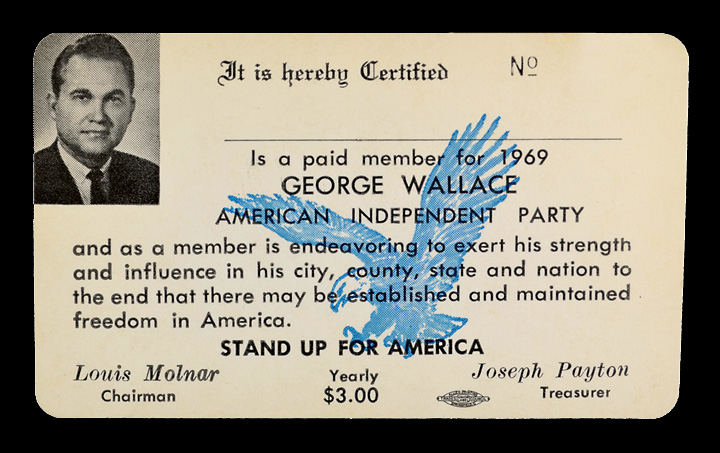
Wallace's 1969 AIP party card, showing annual dues of $3.00 for the organization

In 1967, the AIP was founded by Bill Shearer and his wife, Eileen Knowland Shearer. It nominated George C. Wallace (Democrat) as its presidential candidate and retired U.S. Air Force General Curtis E. LeMay (Republican) as the vice-presidential candidate. Wallace ran on every state ballot in the election, though he did not represent the American Independent Party in all fifty states: in Connecticut, for instance, he was listed on the ballot as the nominee of the "George Wallace Party." The Wallace/LeMay ticket received 13.5 percent of the popular vote and 46 electoral votes from the states of Arkansas, Louisiana, Mississippi, Georgia, and Alabama. No third-party candidate has won more than one electoral vote since the 1968 election.

In 1969, representatives from forty states established the American Party as the successor to the American Independent Party. In some places, such as Connecticut, the American Party was constituted as the American Conservative Party. (The modern American Conservative Party, founded in 2008, is unrelated to the Wallace-era party.) In March 1969, the party ran a candidate in a special election in Tennessee's 8th congressional district in northwestern Tennessee, where Wallace had done well the previous November, to replace Congressman Robert "Fats" Everett, who had died in office. Their candidate, William J. Davis, out-polled Republican Leonard Dunavant, with 16,375 votes to Dunavant's 15,773; but the race was carried by moderate Democrat Ed Jones, with 33,028 votes (47% of the vote).

The party flag, adopted on August 30, 1970, depicts an eagle holding a group of arrows in its left talons, over a compass rose, with a banner which reads "The American Independent Party" at the eagle's base.

The American Party had gained ballot access in Tennessee in 1970 as the result of George Wallace's strong (second-place) showing in the state in 1968, easily crossing the 5 percent threshold required, and held a primary election which nominated a slate of candidates including businessman Douglas Heinsohn for governor. However, neither Heinsohn nor any other candidate running on the American Party line achieved the 5 percent threshold in the 1970 Tennessee election, and it likewise failed to do so in 1972, meaning that the party lost its newfound ballot access, which as of 2025 it has never regained.

In 1972, the American Party nominated Republican Congressman John G. Schmitz of California for president and Tennessee author Thomas Jefferson Anderson, both members of the John Birch Society, for vice president, winning the party over 1.1 million votes, the highest vote share the party has ever achieved since Wallace's run. That year, Hall Lyons, a petroleum industry executive and former Republican, ran as the AP nominee in Louisiana for the United States Senate but finished last in a four-way race dominated by the Democratic nominee, J. Bennett Johnston, Jr.

=== After the 1976 split ===
In 1976, the American Independent Party split into the more moderate American Party, which included more northern conservatives and Schmitz supporters, and the American Independent Party, which focused on the Deep South. Both parties have nominated candidates for the presidency and other offices. Neither the American Party nor the American Independent Party has had national success, and the American Party has not achieved ballot status in any state since 1996.

In the early 1980s, Bill Shearer led the American Independent Party into the Populist Party. From 1992 to 2008, the American Independent Party was the California affiliate of the national Constitution Party, formerly the U.S. Taxpayers Party, whose founders included the late Howard Phillips.

=== 2007 leadership dispute ===
A split in the American Independent Party occurred during the 2008 presidential campaign, with one faction recognizing Jim King as chairman of the AIP with the other recognizing Ed Noonan as chairman. Noonan's faction claims the old AIP main website while the King organization claims the AIP's blog. King's group met in Los Angeles on June 28–29, elected King to state chair. Ed Noonan's faction, which included 8 of the 17 AIP officers, held a convention in Sacramento on July 5, 2008. Issues in the split were U.S. foreign policy and the influence of Constitution Party founder Howard Phillips on the state party.

The King group elected to stay in the Constitution Party and supported its presidential candidate, Chuck Baldwin. It was not listed as the "Qualified Political Party" by the California Secretary of State and Baldwin's name was not printed on the state's ballots. King's group sued for ballot access and their case was dismissed without prejudice.

The Noonan group voted to pull out of the Constitution Party and join a new party called America's Party, put together by perennial candidate and former United Nations Ambassador Alan Keyes as a vehicle for his own presidential campaign. Since Noonan was on record with the California Secretary of State as (outgoing) party chairman, Keyes was added to the state ballots as the AIP candidate. This group elected Markham Robinson as its new chair at the convention.

=== Presidential tickets ===
Year	Presidential nominee	Home state	Previous positions	Vice presidential nominee	Home state	Previous positions	Votes	References and notes
1968	George Wallace (campaign)	Alabama	Governor of Alabama (1963–1967)	Curtis LeMay	California	Chief of Staff of the Air Force (1961–1965); Vice Chief of Staff of the Air Force (1957–1961); Commander-in-Chief of the Strategic Air Command (1948–1957)	9,906,473 (13.5%); 46 EV	Wallace and LeMay carried five states, receiving 45 electoral votes, plus one from a North Carolina faithless elector. This ticket remains, as of the 2024 United States presidential election, the last third party duo to win at least one state's entire electoral votes.
1972	John G. Schmitz	California	Member of the U.S. House of Representatives from California's 35th district (1970–1973)	Thomas J. Anderson	Tennessee	Magazine publisher	1,099,482 (1.4%); 0 EV	
1976	Lester Maddox	Georgia	Governor of Georgia (1967–1971); Lieutenant Governor of Georgia (1971–1975)	William Dyke	Wisconsin	Mayor of Madison (1969–1973); Candidate for Governor of Wisconsin (1974)	170,531 (0.2%); 0 EV	
1980	John Rarick	Louisiana	Member of the U.S. House of Representatives from Louisiana's 6th district (1967–1975)	Eileen Shearer	California	Co-founder of the American Independent Party	41,268 (<0.1%); 0 EV	
1984	Bob Richards (Populist)	Texas	Retired Olympic athlete (1948; 1952; 1956)	Maureen K. Salaman	California	Writer, nutritionist	66,336 (0.1%); 0 EV	
1988	James C. Griffin	Texas	Nominee for United States Senator from California (1980); Nominee for Governor of California (1982); Nominee for Lieutenant Governor of California (1986)	Charles Morsa	California		27,818 (<0.1%); 0 EV	
1992	Howard Phillips (U.S. Taxpayers')	Virginia	Chairman of The Conservative Caucus; Candidate for United States Senator from Massachusetts (1978)	Albion W. Knight	Florida	Presiding Bishop of the United Episcopal Church of North America (1989–1992)	43,369 (<0.1%); 0 EV	
1996	Howard Phillips (U.S. Taxpayers')	Virginia	Chairman of The Conservative Caucus; Candidate for United States Senator from Massachusetts (1978); Nominee for President of the United States (1992)	Herbert Titus	Oregon	Lawyer, writer	184,656 (0.2%); 0 EV	
2000	Howard Phillips (Constitution)	Virginia	Chairman of The Conservative Caucus; Candidate for United States Senator from Massachusetts (1978); Nominee for President of the United States (1992; 1996)	Curtis Frazier	Missouri	Candidate for United States Senator from Missouri (1998)	98,020 (0.1%); 0 EV	
2004	Michael Peroutka (Constitution)	Maryland	Lawyer; Founder of the Institute on the Constitution	Chuck Baldwin	Florida	Pastor, radio host	143,630 (0.1%); 0 EV	
2008	Alan Keyes (campaign) (America's Independent)	New York	Assistant Secretary of State for International Organization Affairs (1985–1987); Candidate for United States Senator from Maryland (1988; 1992); Candidate for President of the United States (1996; 2000); Candidate for United States Senator from Illinois (2004)	Wiley Drake	California	Minister, radio host	47,694 (<0.1%); 0 EV	
2012	Tom Hoefling (America's)	Iowa	Activist	Robert Ornelas	California	Activist	40,641 (<0.1%); 0 EV	
2016	Donald Trump (campaign) (Republican)	New York	Businessman; Chairman of The Trump Organization (1971–2017)	Mike Pence	Indiana	Member of the U.S. House of Representatives from Indiana (2001–2013); Governor of Indiana (2013–2017)	62,984,825 (46.1%); 304 EV	According to CNN, "Trump did not seek the nomination of the American Independent Party and did not have to take any formal steps to accept it. According to Sam Mahood, the press secretary for California Secretary of State Alex Padilla (D), California law permits one party to nominate the presidential candidate of another party and to have that choice reflected on the ballot. California election code does not require a presidential candidate who is already on the ballot to consent to receiving the nomination of another qualified political party."
2020	Rocky De La Fuente (Alliance; Reform)	California	Businessman and perennial candidate	Kanye West (campaign) (Independent; Birthday)	Wyoming	Rapper, producer and fashion designer; 2020 presidential candidate	60,160 (0.34%); 0 EV	
2024	Robert F. Kennedy Jr. (Independent campaign)	California	Environmental lawyer	Nicole Shanahan	California	Attorney	681,450 (0.46%); 0 EV	Suspended his campaign and endorsed Trump.

Following the split within the American Independent Party into factions led by Jim King and Ed Noonan, the Noonan faction has maintained control over the party's operations and ballot access in California. The party did not nominate Chuck Baldwin, the 2008 Constitution Party presidential candidate, nor Virgil Goode, the 2012 nominee, and both candidates were unable to secure independent positions on the California presidential ballot.

=== California elections ===
==== Gubernatorial candidates ====
Electoral results of American Independent Party candidates in California gubernatorial elections
Year	Candidate	# Votes	% Votes
1970	Bill Shearer	65,847	1.01
1974	Edmon V. Kaiser	83,869	1.34
1978	Theresa F. Dietrich	67,103	0.97
1982	James C. Griffin	56,249	0.71
1986	Gary V. Miller	50,547	0.68
1990	Jerome McCready	139,661	1.81
1994	Jerome McCready	133,888	1.55
1998	Nathan Johnson	37,964	0.45
2002	Reinhold Gulke	128,035	1.71
2003	Charles Pineda, Jr.	1,104	0.01
2003	Diane Beall Templin	1,067	0.01
2006	Edward C. Noonan	61,901	0.71
2010	Chelene Nightingale	166,312	1.65
2014	No Candidate (Note: Nominated Republican Tim Donnelly for the top two primary for governor, not affiliated with the party)	N/A	N/A
2018	No Candidate (Note: Nominated Republican John Cox for governor, not affiliated with the party)	N/A	N/A
2021	No Candidate (Note: Nominated Republican Larry Elder for governor, not affiliated with the party)	N/A	N/A
2022	No Candidate (Note: Endorsed Republican Brian Dahle for Governor, not affiliated with the party)	N/A	N/A
2026	No Candidate (Note: Endorsed Republican Chad Bianco for Governor, not affiliated with the party.)	N/A	N/A

==== Statewide candidates ====
===== 2016 =====
2016 California's 43rd State Assembly district election
Primary election
Party	Candidate	Votes	%
Democratic	Laura Friedman	33,276	31.9
Democratic	Ardy Kassakhian	25,357	24.3
Republican	Mark MacCarley	16,551	15.9
Democratic	Andrew J. Blumenfield	13,309	12.8
Republican	Alexandra A. Bustamante	6,524	6.3
Democratic	Dennis R. Bullock	4,294	4.1
Democratic	Rajiv Dalal	3,173	3.0
American Independent	Aaron Cervantes	1,873	1.8
Total votes		104,357	100.0

===== 2020 =====
2020 California's 35th State Senate district election
Primary election
Party	Candidate	Votes	%
Democratic	Steven Craig Bradford (incumbent)	106,742	75.7
American Independent	Anthony Perry	34,253	24.3
Total votes		140,995	100.0
General election
Democratic	Steven Craig Bradford (incumbent)	234,881	72.5
American Independent	Anthony Perry	89,080	27.5
Total votes		323,961	100.0
Democratic hold			

===== 2022 =====
2022 U.S. House of Representatives elections in California's 30th congressional district
Primary election
Party	Candidate	Votes	%
Democratic	Adam Schiff (incumbent)	102,290	62.4
Democratic	G "Maebe A. Girl" Pudlo	21,053	12.9
Republican	Ronda Kennedy	13,953	8.5
Republican	Patrick Lee Gipson	10,529	6.4
Republican	Johnny J. Nalbandian	7,693	4.7
Republican	Paloma Zuniga	2,614	1.6
Democratic	Sal Genovese	2,612	1.6
Green	William "Gunner" Meurer	1,598	1.0
American Independent	Tony Rodriguez	1,460	0.9
Total votes		163,802	100.0

===== 2024 =====
2024 California's 9th State Assembly district election
Primary election
Party	Candidate	Votes	%
Republican	Heath Flora (incumbent)	65,952	73.2
American Independent	Tami Nobriga	21,946	24.4
Democratic	Rosella Rowlison (write-in)	2,139	2.4
Democratic	Belinda Smith (write-in)	87	0.1
Total votes		90,124	100.0
General election
Republican	Heath Flora (incumbent)	129,268	70.1
American Independent	Tami Nobriga	55,169	29.9
Total votes		184,437	100.0
Republican hold			

===== 2026 =====
2026 California Insurance Commissioner primary election
Party	Candidate	Votes	%
Democratic	Patrick Wolff		
Republican	Sean Lee		
American Independent	Keith Davis		
Republican	Robert Howell		
Democratic	Steven Bradford		
Republican	Merritt Farren		
Democratic	Ben Allen		
Republican	Eric Aarnio		
Democratic	Jane Kim		
Republican	Stacy Korsgaden		
Peace and Freedom	Eduardo "Lalo" Vargas		
Total votes			100.0%

2026 California's 7th State Assembly district primary election
Primary election
Party	Candidate	Votes	%
Republican	Josh Hoover (incumbent)		
American Independent	Sanaz Motamedi		
Democratic	Amy Slavensky		
Total votes			100.0

== List of chairs and vice chairs ==
- Bill Shearer: 1967–1999
- Nathan Johnson: 1999–2002
- Jim King: 2002–2004
- Nancy Spirkoff: 2004–2006
- Edward C. Noonan/Mark Seidenberg: 2006–2008
- Disputed: Jim King and Markham Robinson claim chairmanship: 2008–2024
- Victor Marani/James Mallamace: 2024–current

== California membership issues ==
In 2016, approximately 3% of California's 17.2 million voters were registered with the American Independent Party (AIP), ranking it as the third-largest political party in the state by registration, following the Democratic (43%) and Republican (28%) parties and those who registered as "no party preference" (24%).

However, it has long been proposed by political analysts that the party, which has received very few votes in recent California elections, maintains its state ballot status because people join the American Independent Party mistakenly believing that they are registering as "independent" voters.

A 2016 Los Angeles Times investigation suggested that a significant number of voters registered with the AIP may have done so under the misconception that they were registering as independent, unaffiliated voters, which is officially designated as "no party preference" in California. A poll of voters registered with the AIP indicated that a majority may not have intended to register with the party. The investigation highlighted potential confusion caused by the party's name.

A 2016 poll conducted of California voters registered with the AIP showed that 73% identify themselves as "no affiliation" and 3% identify themselves as "undecided." Upon learning the AIP platform, 50% of registered AIP voters wanted to leave the AIP. A Times review of voting records revealed a wide array of Californians have fallen victim to this error, including celebrities such as Sugar Ray Leonard, Demi Moore, Emma Stone, and Kaley Cuoco. Similarly, in 2008, Jennifer Siebel, then-fiancée of San Francisco's former Democratic mayor Gavin Newsom, attempted to change her party affiliation from Republican to unaffiliated, but "checked the American Independent box thinking that was what independent voters were supposed to do."

This confusion results in accidentally registered AIP members being unable to vote in presidential primary elections and, in prior years, in all partisan primary elections other than those of the AIP. A number of California registrars of voters had expressed concern over the confusion that the party's name causes. Kim Alexander, president of the nonpartisan California Voter Foundation, said that the California voter form was "confusing and somewhat misleading." However, since the advent of the "top-two" blanket primary in California in 2012, all voters may participate in non-presidential primary elections where nominations for public office are to be made. Presidential nominations and elections of members of party county central committees are still restricted to voters registered in the party where such contests are held, but a party may choose to allow voters with No Party Preference to vote in their presidential primary. In addition, voters are able to re-register to the party of their choosing on election day via election day registration, mitigating the issue further.

To address the confusion, the State Legislature passed SB 696 in 2019 to prohibit political parties in California from having the word "independent" within their names. The bill was specifically targeted at the American Independent Party. However, Governor Gavin Newsom vetoed the bill.
