= American Party of the United States =

- Chairman: Bruce Williams
- Founded: February 1, 1969
- Split from: American Independent Party
- Succeeded by: Independent American Party (1998)
- Headquarters: Utah
- Ideology: National conservatism Nativism
- Political position: Right-wing

The American Party of the United States is a conservative political party in the United States. The party adheres to its Permanent Principles, which were established in 1969.

The party nominated the same candidates in 1968 and 1972 as the American Independent Party, before diverging and nominating their own candidates from 1976 onwards.

== History ==
The party began as part of the American Independent Party, supporters of George Wallace's 1968 campaign for the presidency, and was the formal name of the party on the ballot in Tennessee. The party rejected terms such as "liberal" or "conservative" instead defining themselves as those who "acknowledges the Lord God as the Creator, Preserver, and Ruler of the Universe and of the Nation."

The party claimed to represent "forgotten Americans" who are insulted as "Archie Bunker" (Note: A character from the sitcom All in the Family designed to satirize white middle-aged racists, who's "largely defined by his bigotry toward a diverse group of individuals: blacks, Hispanics, "Commies", Freemasons, gays, women, hippies, Jews, Asians, Catholics, "women's libbers", and Polish–Americans") and are called "old fashioned" and "flag wavers" to offer them a real patriotic option, instead of the "lesser of two evils."

The party was opposed to the Vietnam War claiming it was illegal since Congress never authorized American entry, and that it led to a generation of Americans to suffer through a war that the government had no intention of winning. However, the party also supported extra-judicial raids on Viet Cong prison camps to liberate POWs.

In 1969, the AIP became the American Party at a convention attended by representatives from 37 states. Following the 1972 election, the American Party formally split from the American Independent Party. Both parties have nominated candidates for the presidency and other offices, although the AIP has in more recent years considered itself a California affiliate of the Constitution Party.

In New York, the American Party ran a state ticket in 1974 under the name of Courage Party, because a state law there prohibits the use of the word "American" on the ballot. The AIP won its strongest finish in the 1972 presidential election; nominee John G. Schmitz carried 1,090,673 votes (3rd place).

In 1990, some former members of the American party founded the Christian Party.

In 1995, the Utah Independent American Party became the party's Utah state affiliate.

The American Party has failed to achieve ballot status in any state since 1996.

In 1998, the Utah party split and formed the Independent American Party, and began pursuing their own state affiliate parties across the country.

The party's website disappeared sometime in 2008.

In 2010, the Ohio party endorsed several Libertarian Party candidates.

The party had a Florida affiliate, the American Party of Florida, that appeared to carry on operations into June 2011, but became defunct after that and no longer is listed as a political party in Florida.

In 2015, the party created a new website; a Twitter account and Facebook page were also created. The American Party is now formally known as the "American Party of the United States", and disclaims any association with the "American Party of South Carolina", the "Independent American Party", or the "American Party of America".

== Presidential and vice-presidential candidates ==
Electoral History of the American Party

American Party National Campaigns
Year	Convention Site & City	Dates	Presidential nominee	Vice-Pres. nominee	Votes
1968			George C. Wallace (Alabama)	Curtis LeMay (Ohio)	9,901,151
1972	Freedom Hall, Louisville, Kentucky	August 3–5, 1972	U.S. Rep. John G. Schmitz (California)	Thomas J. Anderson (Tennessee)	1,090,673
1976	Salt Palace, Salt Lake City, Utah	June 16–20, 1976	Thomas J. Anderson (Tennessee)	Rufus E. Shackleford (Florida)	160,773
1980	Pasadena, California	December 8–9, 1979	Percy L. Greaves, Jr. (New York)	Frank L. Varnum (California)	6,648
1980	Anti-Greaves ticket in Kansas		Frank W. Shelton (Kansas)	George E. Jackson	1,555
1980	Unpledged Anti-Greaves; Presidential Electors in Minnesota		No nominee	No nominee	6,136
1984	Charlotte, North Carolina	December 1–3, 1983	Delmar Dennis (Tennessee)	Traves Brownlee (Delaware)	13,161
1988	Salt Lake City, Utah	June 1987	Delmar Dennis (Tennessee)	Earl Jeppson	3,475
1992	Pensacola, Florida	June 1992	Robert J. Smith (Utah)	Doris Feimer (North Dakota)	292
1996	Wichita, Kansas	March 1996	Diane Beall Templin (California)	Gary Van Horn (Utah)	1,847
2000	Oklahoma City, Oklahoma	March 30–31, 2000	Don Rogers (California)	Al Moore (Virginia)	0
2004	Bob Carpenter Center Newark, Delaware	July 11–12, 2003	Robert N. Boyd (Indiana) (withdrew)	Walton C. Thompson (withdrew)	0
2004	Kenner, Louisiana	January 10, 2004	Diane Beall Templin (California)	Al Moore (Virginia)	0
2008	Jacaranda Hotel, Avon Park, Florida	March 7–8, 2008	Diane Beall Templin (California)	Linda Patterson (Indiana)	0
2016	Kansas City, Missouri	May 6–7, 2016	Tom Hoefling (Iowa)	Steve Schulin (South Carolina)	

Sources for table:

- Ohio Elects the President (2000), pp. 143–174.
- American Party history at OurCampaigns.com
- James T. Havel, U.S. Presidential Candidates and the Elections, vol. 2
