= Leonard Dunavant =

American businessman and politician

Leonard C. Dunavant (October 29, 1919 – February 28, 1995) was an American businessman and politician from Tennessee who served as a Republican member of the Tennessee House of Representatives and Tennessee State Senate and an unsuccessful candidate in 1969 for a special election for U. S. Representative from Tennessee's 8th congressional district.

A native of Ripley, Tennessee, for many years he operated a furniture store in nearby Millington. He also served on the Millington City Council.
