= Memphis City Schools =

Former school district in Tennessee, United States

Address
- 2597 Avery Avenue Memphis, Shelby County, Tennessee, 38112; United States

District information
- Grades: Pre-K–12th
- Closed: July 1, 2013

Other information
- Website: web.archive.org/*/http://www.mcsk12.net/

Memphis City Schools (MCS) was the school district operating public schools in the city of Memphis, Tennessee, United States. It was headquartered in the Frances E. Coe Administration Building. On March 8, 2011, residents voted to disband the city school district, effectively merging it with the Shelby County School District. The merger took effect July 1, 2013. After much legal maneuvering, all six incorporated municipalities (other than Memphis) created separate school districts in 2014. Total enrollment, as of the 2010–2011 school year, was about 103,000 students, which made the district the largest in Tennessee.

MCS served the entire city of Memphis. Some areas of unincorporated Shelby County were zoned to Memphis City Schools from Kindergarten through 12th grade. Some unincorporated areas of Shelby County were zoned to schools in Shelby County Schools for elementary and middle school and Memphis City Schools for high school.

As of August 2014, there are six new municipal school districts. Collierville Schools, Bartlett City Schools, Millington Municipal Schools, Germantown Municipal Schools, Arlington Community Schools and Lakeland School System. Shelby County Schools serves the city of Memphis and as well the unincorporated areas of Shelby County.

== History ==
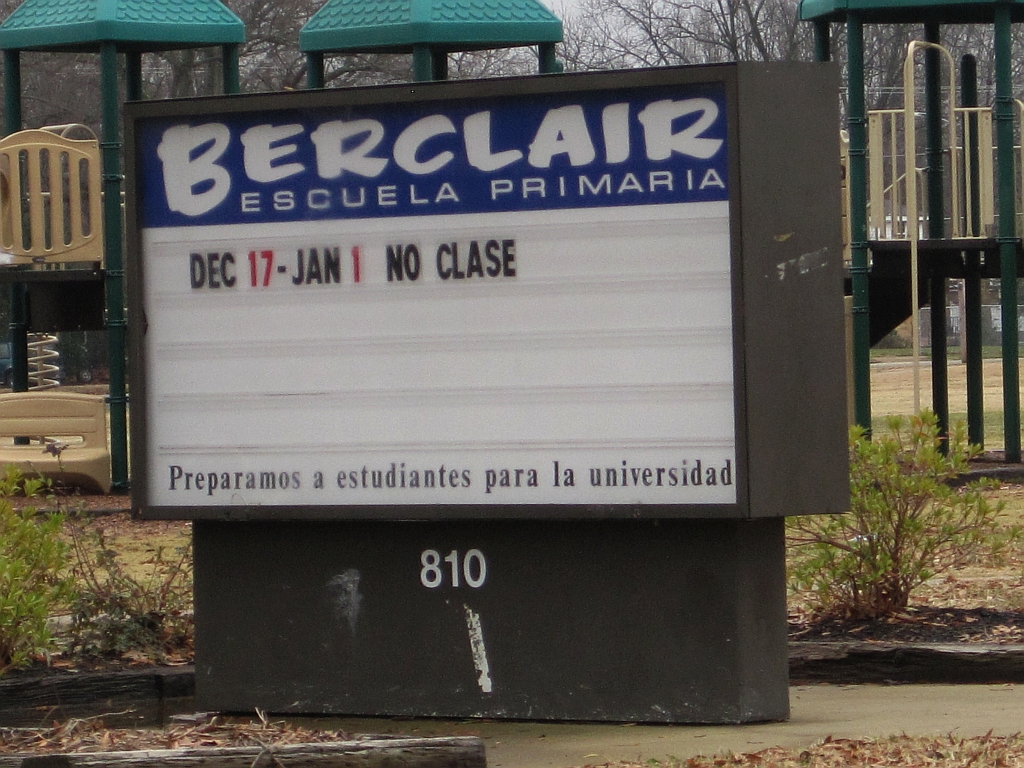
Spanish sign of Berclair Elementary School

In the mid-1960s, the district had about 130,000 students. The numbers of white students and black students were almost equal.

In the mid-1960s, the district still segregated its schools. Daniel Kiel, a law professor at the University of Memphis who had authored publications about school integration in Memphis, said that the efforts to desegregate were, as paraphrased by Sam Dillon of The New York Times, "subterfuge and delay". Desegregation first began with the Memphis 13, a group of first graders. In 1973, the federal government ordered desegregation busing in Memphis. As a result, massive white flight occurred in Memphis City Schools. In 1973, the school district had 71,000 White students. In a period of four years, 40,000 of the White students left.

In November 2009, Memphis City Schools won a grant of $90 million from the Bill and Melinda Gates Foundation. The gift of more than $90 million from Gates to fund plans and improve teacher effectiveness, including raising the bar for tenure and paying $6,000 incentives for high-quality new teachers who stayed at least four years.

In July 2011, the Memphis City Schools Board of Commissioners voted to postpone opening Memphis City Schools indefinitely until the Memphis City Council provided money set aside for the school system. The incident was reported in national news.

In 2011 Marcus Pohlmann, a Rhodes College political science professor, wanted to study the Memphis schools to compare performances of schools with low income student bodies and schools with higher income student bodies. He concluded that he was unable to do so because "There are no middle-class black schools in Memphis. They’re all poor."

== School uniforms ==
All MCS students were required to wear school uniforms from the fall of 2002 until the district was dissolved in 2013. Students could wear oxford shirts, polo shirts, turtlenecks, and blouses with "Peter Pan" collars. Colors varied, depending upon the school. In general, all white shirts were acceptable. Sweatshirts had to be white, black, navy blue, tan or any other colors approved by the individual campus. Trousers, shorts, skirts, and jumpers had to be black, tan, or navy blue. Denim clothing was not allowed. When MCS and SCS merged in 2013, the former MCS schools kept this uniform policy while the existing SCS schools did not, since the suburbs planned to form their own districts and leave SCS within a year.

== Schools ==
=== K-12 schools ===
Alternative

- Avon-Lenox School

=== Secondary schools ===
==== 7-12 schools ====
Zoned

- Bellevue Middle School
- East Career and Technology Center
- Kingsbury Middle/High School
- Oakhaven Middle/High School
- Treadwell Middle/High School

==== High schools ====
Zoned

- George Washington Carver High School
- Central High School
- Cordova High School (Unincorporated Shelby County)
- Craigmont High School
- Douglass High School
- East High School (Formerly a middle and high school)
- Fairley High School
- Frayser High School (Formerly a middle and high school)
- Germantown High School
- Hamilton High School
- Kirby High School
- Manassas High School
- Melrose High School
- Mitchell High School
- Northside High School
- Watkins Overton High School
- Raleigh-Egypt High School
- Ridgeway High School
- Sheffield High School
- Southside High School
- Trezevant High School (Formerly a middle and high school)
- Booker T. Washington High School
- Westwood High School
- White Station High School
- Whitehaven High School
- Wooddale High School

Alternative

- Middle College High School

==== Middle schools ====
6–8

- Cordova Middle School

6–8

- Airways Middle School
- American Way Middle School
- Bellevue Middle School
- Colonial Middle School
- Corry Middle School
- Craigmont Middle School
- Cypress Middle School
- Fairview Middle School
- Geeter Middle School
- Hamilton Middle School
- Havenview Middle School
- Hickory Ridge Middle School
- Humes Middle School
- Kirby Middle School
- Lanier Middle School
- Raleigh-Egypt Middle School
- Ridgeway Middle School
- Riverwood Middle School
- Sherwood Middle School
- South Side Middle School
- Vance Middle School
- A. Maceo Walker Middle School
- Westside Middle School (a 7-12 school until 07–08)
- White Station Middle School (Wikipedia)
- Wooddale Middle School

7–8

- Chickasaw Middle School
- Georgian Hills Middle School

=== K-8 schools ===
Zoned

- Lester School
- Snowden School

Alternative

- John P. Freeman Optional School

=== K-7 schools ===
Zoned

- Douglass School

=== Elementary schools ===
==== Zoned elementary schools ====
K-6

- Berclair Elementary School
- Brookmeade Elementary School
- Lucie E. Campbell Elementary School
- Corning Elementary School
- Coro Lake Elementary School
- Denver Elementary School
- Double Tree Elementary School
- Downtown Elementary School
- Ford Road Elementary School
- Frayser Elementary School
- Georgian Hills Elementary School
- Grahamwood Elementary School
- Grandview Heights Elementary School
- Graves Elementary School
- Hawkins Mill Elementary School
- Jackson Elementary School
- Kingsbury Elementary School
- Levi Elementary School
- Oakhaven Elementary School
- Shelby Oaks Elementary School
- Treadwell Elementary School
- Wells Station Elementary School
- Westside Elementary School
- Westwood Elementary School
- White's Chapel Elementary School
- Whitney Elementary School

K-5

- Alcy Elementary School
- Alton Elementary School
- Balmoral/Ridgeway Elementary School
- Kate Bond Elementary School (Unincorporated Shelby County)
- Bethel Grove Elementary School
- William Brewster Elementary School
- Brownsville Road Elementary School
- Bruce Elementary School
- Caldwell Elementary School
- Carnes Elementary School
- Charjean Elementary School
- Cherokee Elementary School
- Robert R. Church Elementary School
- Coleman Elementary School
- Cromwell Elementary School
- Crump Elementary School
- Cummings Elementary School
- Dunbar Elementary School
- Egypt Elementary School
- Evans Elementary School
- Fairley Elementary School
- Florida-Kansas Elementary School
- Fox Meadows Elementary School
- Gardenview Elementary School
- Georgia Avenue Elementary School
- Germanshire Elementary School
- Getwell Elementary School
- Goodlett Elementary School
- Gordon Elementary School
- Graceland Elementary School
- Guthrie Elementary School
- Hamilton Elementary School
- Hanley Elementary School
- Hickory Ridge Elementary School
- A. B. Hill Elementary School
- Holmes Road Elementary School
- Idlewild Elementary School
- Keystone Elementary School
- Klondike Elementary School
- Knight Road Elementary School
- Lakeview Elementary School
- LaRose Elementary School
- Lincoln Elementary School
- Magnolia Elementary School
- Manor Lake Elementary School
- Newberry Elementary School
- Norris Elementary School
- Oak Forest Elementary School
- Oakshire Elementary School
- Orleans Elementary School
- Peabody Elementary School
- Rainshaven Elementary School
- Raleigh-Bartlett Meadows Elementary School
- Richland Elementary School
- Riverview Elementary School
- Ross Elementary School
- Rozelle Elementary School
- Scenic Hills Elementary School
- Sea Isle Elementary School
- Shady Grove Elementary School
- Shannon Elementary School
- Sharpe Elementary School
- Sheffield Elementary School
- Sherwood Elementary School
- South Park Elementary School
- Spring Hill Elementary School
- Springdale Elementary School
- Vollentine Elementary School
- Westhaven Elementary School
- White Station Elementary
- Whitehaven Elementary School
- Willow Oaks Elementary School
- Winchester Elementary School
- Winridge Elementary School
- Whites Chapel Elementary School

1–5

- Campus School

K-4

- Cordova Elementary School

==== Alternative elementary schools ====
K-6

- Delano Elementary school

== Former schools ==
=== Former elementary schools ===
- Hollywood Elementary School (closed spring 2007) (Students reassigned to Springdale Elementary School)
- Lauderdale Elementary School (closed spring 2007) (Students reassigned to Larose Elementary School)
- Macon Elementary School (closed spring 2007) (Students reassigned to Berclair Elementary School)
- Ridgeway Elementary School was merged into Balmoral Elementary in spring 2007. The building underwent moderate renovations to accommodate what is currently Ridgeway High School's Ninth Grade Freshmen Academy.
- Graves Elementary School, closed in 2014.

=== Former secondary schools ===
- Longview Middle School (closed spring 2007)

=== Former high schools ===
- Humes High School
- Messick High School
- Memphis Technical High School
- Southside High School

== Blue Ribbon Schools ==
Seven Memphis City Schools have been recognized by the U.S. Department of Education's Blue Ribbon Schools Program, which honors schools that are academically superior or demonstrate dramatic gains in student achievement. These schools are:

- 1982-83 — Snowden School
- 1985-86 — Grahamwood School
- 1992-93 — Craigmont Junior/Senior High School
- 1993-94 — Richland Elementary School
- 2004 — Keystone Elementary
- 2005 — Delano Elementary School
- 2008 — John P. Freeman Optional School

== Other facilities ==
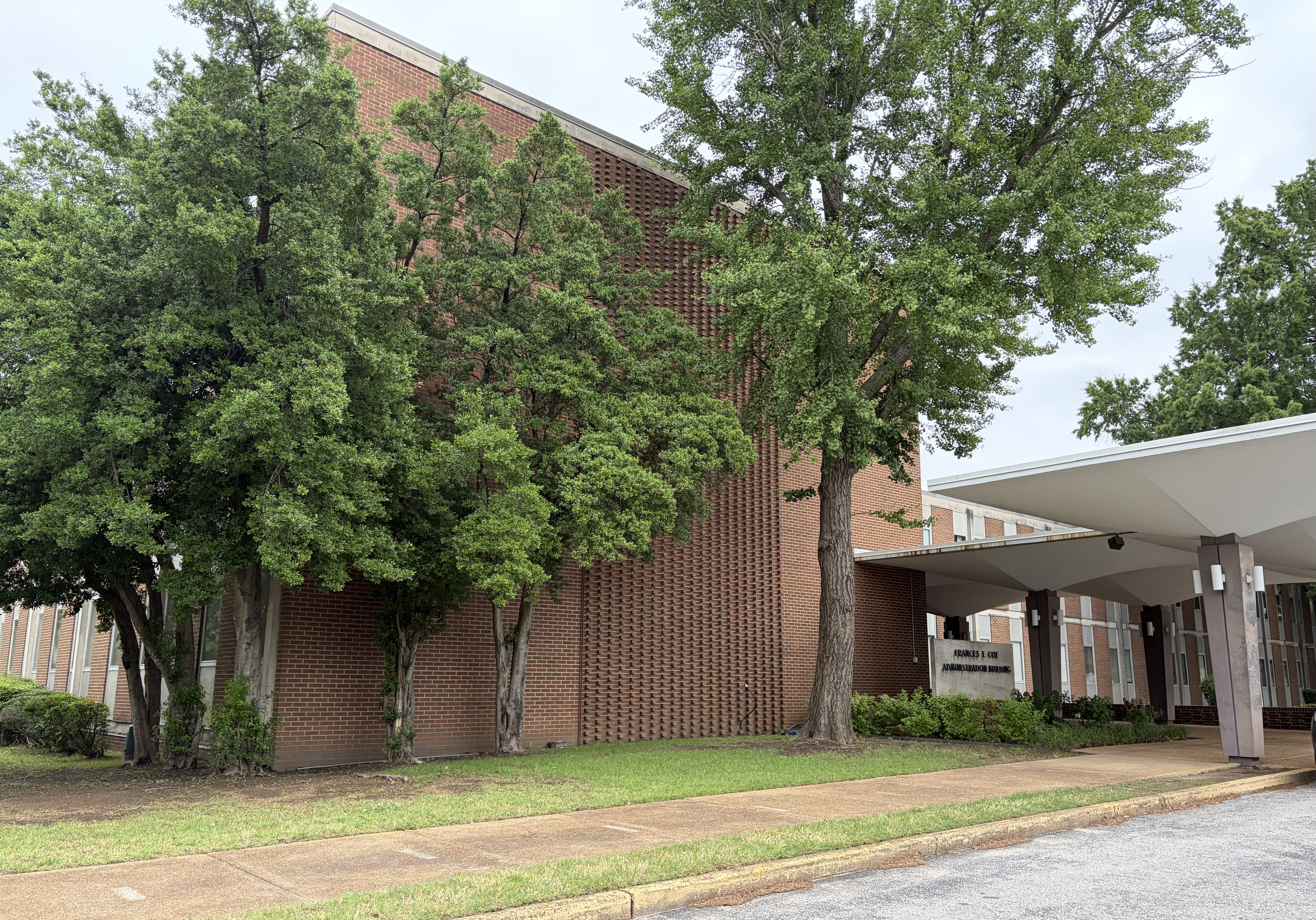
The Francis E. Coe Administration Building

Memphis City Schools was headquartered in the Francis E. Coe Administration Building, It was shared with the pre-merger Shelby County Schools. The building has two wings, one for each district. As of 2013 the corridor linking the wings had a double-locked doors, and the glass panels had been covered by particle boards. Irving Hamer, the deputy superintendent of Memphis City Schools, described the barrier as "our Berlin Wall."

== See also ==
- History of Memphis, Tennessee
- List of high schools in Tennessee
- List of school districts in Tennessee
- Memphis-Shelby County Schools
- WQOX, a radio station owned by Memphis City Schools
