= Collierville Middle School =

Location
- 580 Quinn Rd; Collierville, Tennessee 38017; United States; 35.0289°N 89.6608°W

Information
- Type: Public
- Motto: You Belong Here!
- Established: 1973; 53 years ago
- School district: Shelby County Schools (formerly) Collierville Schools
- NCES School ID: 470014901575
- Principal: Anita Swindle
- Teaching staff: 62.00 (FTE)
- Grades: 6–8
- Enrollment: 792 (2020–2021)
- Student to teacher ratio: 12.77
- Campus type: Suburban
- Colors: Maroon and Black
- Mascot: Dragon
- Nickname: CMS
- Website: colliervillems.colliervilleschools.org

Collierville Middle School is a public middle school (grades 6–8) located in Collierville, Tennessee, which operates under Collierville Schools. It was founded in 1973 in the Shelby County Schools and has since used four different campuses as one of the two public middle schools in the town of Collierville.

== History ==
Collierville Middle School was established 1973, originally teaching the fifth, sixth, seventh, and eighth grades before shifting campuses in 1976 and reducing its taught grades to sixth through eighth. During the 1982–83 school year, Collierville Middle School became one of the first educational institutions in the country to receive a Blue Ribbon School award from the United States Department of Education. The school moved campuses again in 1995, transferring to the first campus of Collierville High School. It currently operates from its fourth campus on Quinn Road in southern Collierville. It was administrated by Shelby County Schools until Memphis City Schools merged with Shelby County Schools, spurring the creation of Collierville Schools in February 2014.

== Academics ==
CLEP courses in United States history and the natural sciences are offered to 8th-grade students at the school. Nonetheless, in 2019, the school was designated as requiring "support and improvement" after the Tennessee Department of Education reported that economically disadvantaged students struggle disproportionately at the middle school.

== Activities ==
=== Arts ===
Collierville Middle School has programs for the visual arts, STEM, and theatre. In addition, it has a choir and an orchestra, as well as a band that plays at Collierville town events.

=== Athletics ===
Collierville Middle School offers cheerleading, cross country, football, mountain biking, pom, hip-hop, girls' soccer, and volleyball sports programs in autumn; basketball (with cheerleading), bowling, swimming, trap, and wrestling in winter; and baseball, boys' soccer, softball, and track and field in the spring.

=== Extracurriculars ===
Extracurricular activities offered at Collierville Middle School include clubs for art, literature, Best Buddies, Biblical studies, drama, environmentalism, video gaming, Harry Potter, engineering, Lego, mathematics, robotics, student government, and yearbook; there are also divisions of the Fellowship of Christian Athletes and Junior Beta Club.
