= Collierville High School =

Public school in Collierville, Tennessee, US

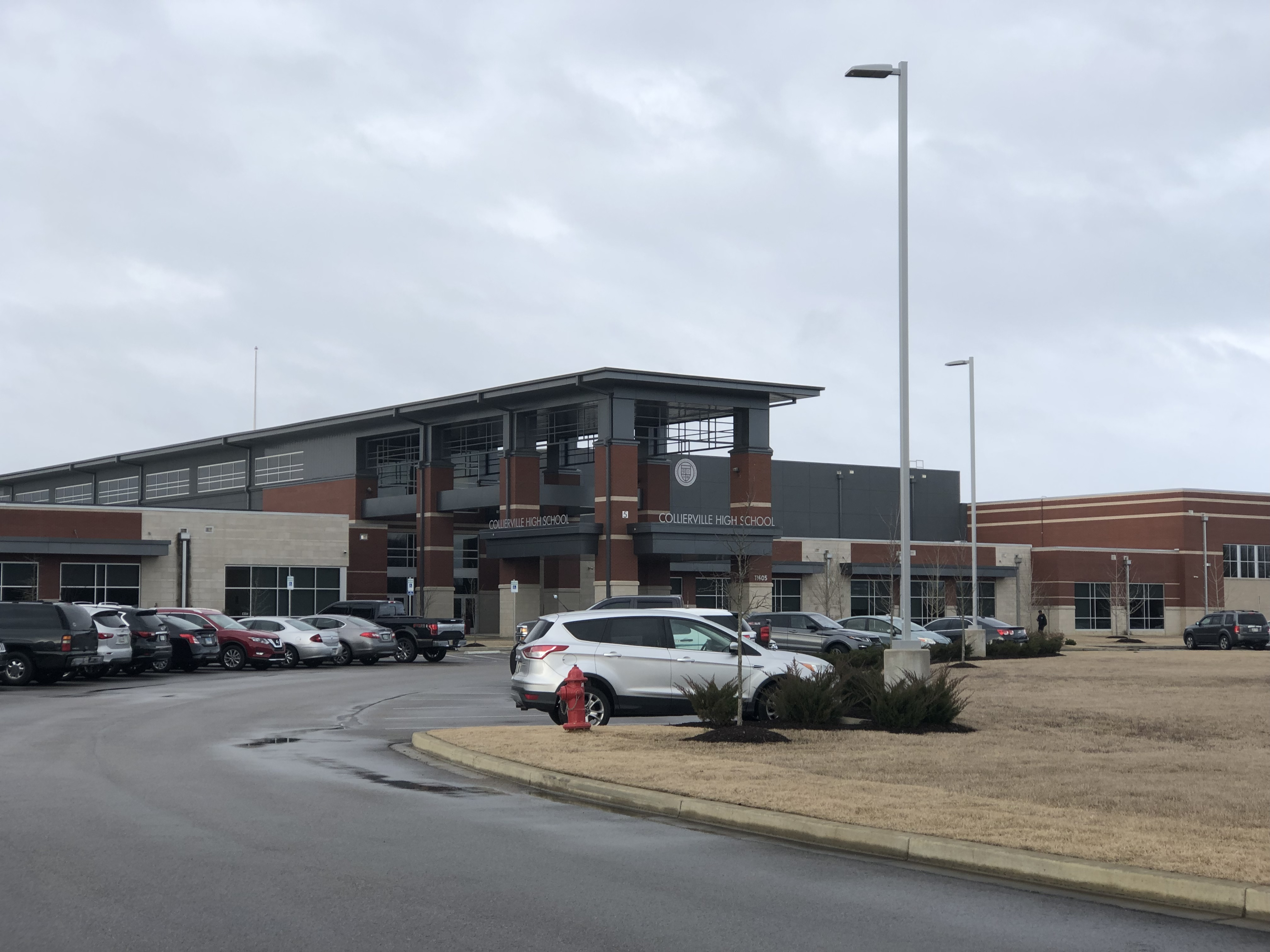
- Collierville High School in March 2020

Location
- 11605 E Shelby Drive; Collierville, Tennessee 38017; United States; 35.0181°N 89.6766°W

Information
- Type: Public
- Established: 1905; 121 years ago
- School district: Collierville Schools
- NCES School ID: 470014901574
- Principal: Roger L. Jones III
- Teaching staff: 154.75 (FTE)
- Grades: 9–12
- Enrollment: 2,998 (2023–2024)
- Student to teacher ratio: 19.37
- Campus type: Rural-fringe
- Colors: Maroon; White
- Mascot: Blister the Dragon
- Rival: Houston High School
- Newspaper: Dragon Spirit
- Feeder schools: West Collierville Middle School, Collierville Middle School
- Website: colliervillehs.colliervilleschools.org

Collierville High School is a public high school (grades 9–12) located in Collierville, Tennessee which operates under the administration of Collierville Schools. It was previously under the authority of Shelby County Schools until Collierville Schools splintered from it in 2014. Its school colors are maroon and white—formerly black and gold—and its mascot is the dragon, originally designed by elementary art teacher Lisa Ackerman as "Blister the Dragon".

Collierville High School is fully accredited by the Southern Association of Colleges and Schools and holds memberships in NASSP, the Tennessee Secondary School Athletic Association (TSSAA), NACAC, and SACAC.

== History ==
The original campus was built in 1905, with expansions and additions being made in 1911, 1924, and 1926; the last was a large gymnasium. In the 1930s, the school became one of the first buildings in Tennessee to be aided by the Civilian Conservation Corps, and it was given a $250,000 grant by the CWA in the winter of 1933–34. Hundreds of workers were brought in from Memphis, Tennessee to build an auditorium, library, and study hall in later years.

The second campus sat at the intersection of Byhalia and Frank Road on the same property that once held the Bellevue High-Security Correctional Facility. Collierville High School transitioned there in the autumn of 1995, after ninety years at its original campus. The site received a $14,500,000 addition that made it the largest school facility in Shelby County. In 2014, Collierville High School became the central high school of the newly created Collierville Schools district after its formation from Shelby County Schools.

The third and current campus, first opened for the 2018–19 school year, was built on land south of State Route 385 and east of Sycamore Road on Shelby Drive at a cost of $94 million due to overcrowding at the previous campus. The former building at Byhalia and Frank Road became the location of the West Collierville Middle School.

== Academics ==
Academically, the school offers 25 dual enrollment courses, 34 Honors courses, and 28 Advanced Placement courses, and the school reports an ACT average of 25.3. It was listed on Newsweek’s America’s Best High Schools list from 2008-2013, has the largest PTSA in the state of Tennessee, and has had 21 United States Presidential Scholar candidates in the past fourteen years with two Presidential Scholar winners (in 2002 and 2014). Collierville High School has numerous National Merit Scholarship Program finalists every year. Collierville High School offers an array of extracurricular activities, with 113 clubs are registered at the school.

== Athletics ==
The school accommodates twenty-two sports and five club sports. The boys' baseball team won the state championship in 2013, and the school's Joshua Wheeler won the 2014 Decathlon state championship for track and field. The Hockey Team won the state championship in 2005 becoming the first team in school history to win a state championship.

== Robotics ==
The school has a team participating in FIRST Robotics Competition. Founded in 2014 under the name of Dragon Robotics, they are team number 5002. They have won numerous awards at competitions, including the Highest Rookie Seed and Rookie All-Star awards in their rookie year. Along with these, they have earned the Team Spirit Award in and First Dean's List Finalist Award in 2018, the Safety Award in 2019, and the Regional Finalists award in 2022.

== Awards and recognition ==
Collierville High School is the only public high school in Tennessee that was offered a charter from the Cum Laude Society. CHS ranks in the "Top 10 High Schools in Tennessee" by U.S. News & World Report and Newsweek's "America's Best High Schools". CHS is also recognized annually as a winner in The Washington Post's "High School Challenge."

== Notable alumni ==
- Hunter Bradley, former NFL long snapper for the Green Bay Packers
- Zack Cozart, former MLB shortstop for the Cincinnati Reds
- Jack Dougherty, MLB relief pitcher in the Minnesota Twins organization
- Nikki McCray, former women's basketball head coach of Mississippi State & Old Dominion, former professional women's basketball player, 2-time Olympic Gold medalist (1996, 2000)
- Jessica Lopez, Associate AD / Director of Football Academics & Executive Operations University of Miami
- Drew Pomeranz, MLB pitcher for the San Diego Padres
- Olan Rogers, YouTube star and creator of Final Space on TBS
- Mike Ferrara, Director of Player Personnel: Football Indiana University
