= Hunter Bradley =

Hunter Bradley may refer to:

- Hunter Bradley (American football) (born 1994), American football player
- Hunter Bradley (Power Rangers Ninja Storm), a fictional character on American television series Power Rangers Ninja Storm
