= Messick High School =

Coordinates: 35.11184°N 89.95405°W

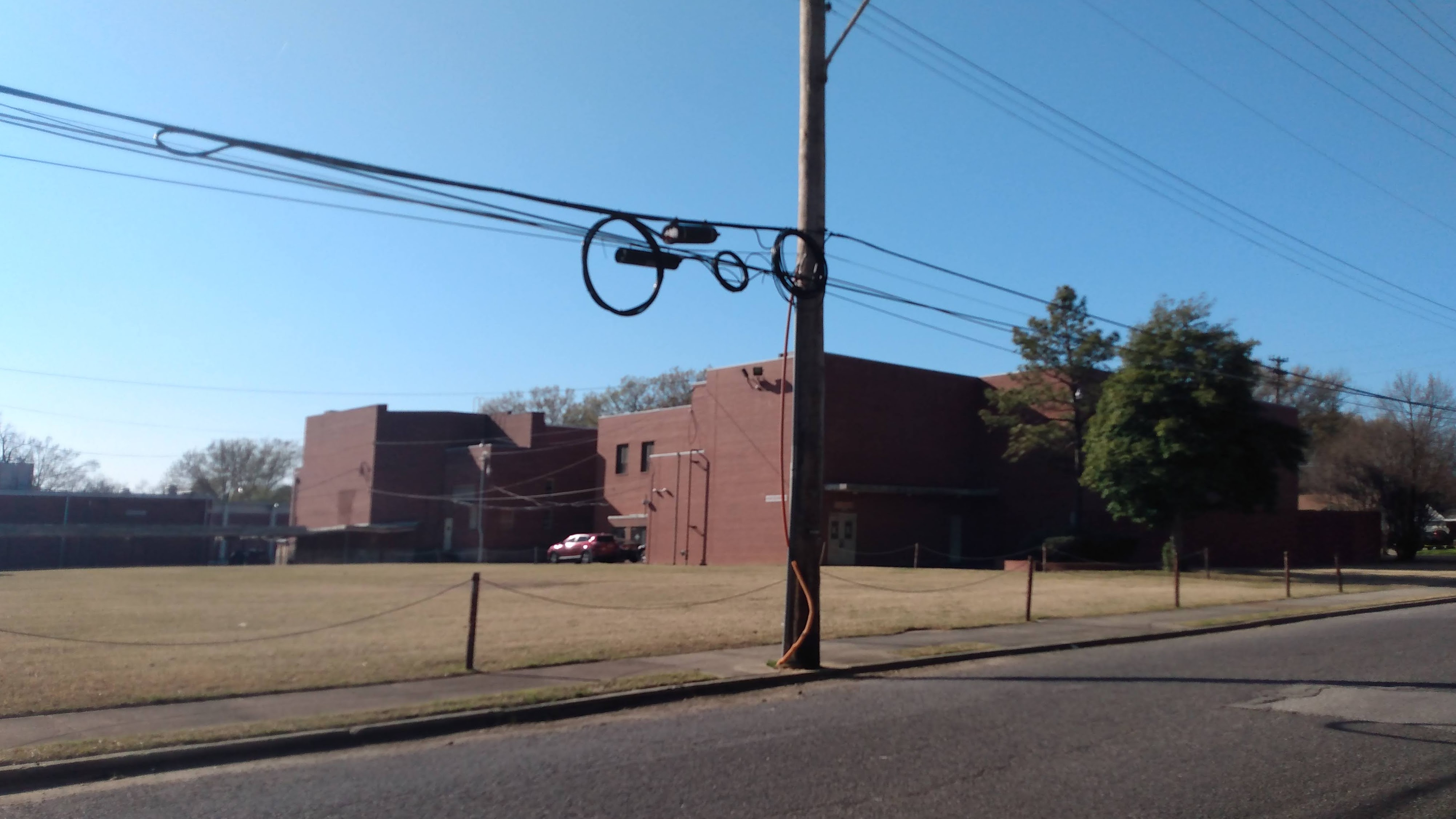
- One of the remaining buildings in 2023

Location
- 703 S Greer St; Memphis, Tennessee 38111; United States

Information
- School type: Public
- Established: 1908
- Closed: 1981
- Mascot: Panthers

Messick High School was a public high school in Memphis, Tennessee, established in 1908 and operated from 1909 to 1981. The main building was demolished in 1982, but Memphis City Schools used some other former Messick facilities to house the Messick Adult Education Center.

== History ==
Messick High School was built by Shelby County to consolidate three elementary schools. It was a full 12-grade school until 1912 when the high school grades 9–12 were moved to the new and nearby West Tennessee Normal School (Now U of M) to train teachers. After that Messick School included only elementary grades, but a high school building was added in the 1920s and all 12 school grades were enrolled as of 1924. At the time of its construction, the school was in a rural area of Shelby County called Buntyn, Tennessee, where truck farming was a major economic activity.

The school was named for Elizabeth Messick (1876–1951), a University of Chicago graduate who was superintendent of Shelby County Schools from 1904 to 1908 and who had been criticized for spending $30,000 to build the new high school. Messick later married Memphis Commercial Appeal journalist Elmer E. Houck and used the name Elizabeth Messick Houck.

In its rural location, some early students lived too far from the school to walk there, so they were transported to school in horse- or mule-drawn wagons. Initially, lunches were provided by students' mothers who brought hot meals to the school at mid-day. With time, Messick became the first school in West Tennessee to have a school cafeteria.

Residential subdivisions grew up in the surrounding area in the 1920s. In the 1930s, Messick became part of the Memphis City Schools system. Much additional residential development occurred in the area in the late 1940s, after World War II ended. By the 1970s, however, the neighborhood was losing population and Messick's enrollment declined. In the 1970s, Messick high school also had kindergarten classes. The city school board voted to close the school. The graduating class of 1981 was Messick's last, and the school's main building was demolished in 1982.

=== Messick Adult Education Center ===
In July 1987, the Messick Center for Adult Learning opened up in the renovated high school library. The center offered classes for adults to earn their General Equivalency Diploma and also offered literacy tutoring. In 2016, the adult education program was ended, and the buildings were repurposed to house Shelby County Schools support staff.

== Notable alumni ==
- Packy Axton, American musician
- Steve Cropper, American guitarist, song writer, and record producer
- Dick Davis, American football player
- Ted Davis, American football player
- Donald "Duck" Dunn, bass guitarist and song writer
- William Fones, Tennessee Supreme Court Justice
- Steve Owens, chair of the Tennessee Democratic Party
- Michael Pearl, minister
- Ruth Welting, operatic soprano
- Jimi Jamison, Singer of Survivor, Cobra, Target
- Gary Burbank (real name Billy Purser), Louisville and Cincinnati Radio Personality, member of the National Radio Hall of Fame
