= Jack Dougherty (baseball) =

American baseball player (born 2001)

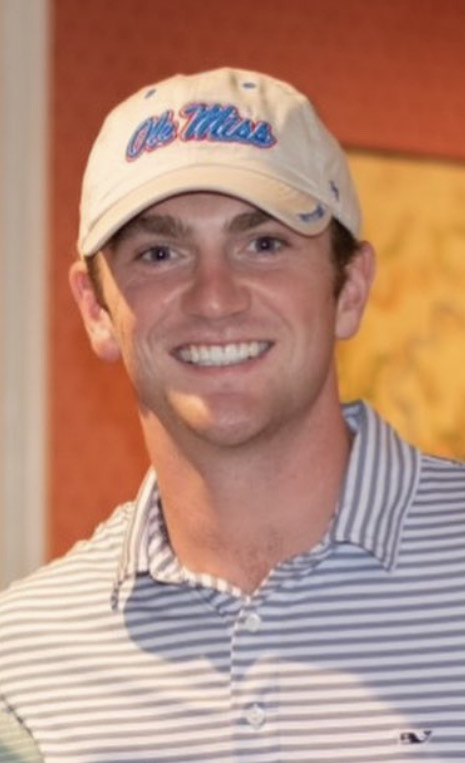
- Dougherty in 2021

Minnesota Twins
- Relief pitcher
- Born: October 5, 2001 (age 24); Germantown, Tennessee, U.S.
- Bats: Right Throws: Right

Jack Edward Dougherty (born October 5, 2001) is an American professional baseball relief pitcher in the Minnesota Twins organization.

== Amateur career ==
Dougherty was raised in Collierville, Tennessee by Geoff and Diane Dougherty and was a three-year letterwinner at Collierville High School under head coach Jeff Munier. In his final season with the school, he pitched 86 strikeouts over 59 innings, finishing with an ERA of 0.71.

Dougherty joined the Ole Miss bullpen in his freshman year as a redshirt, but by the end of the season had emerged as a reliable relief pitcher. He appeared in twelve games, going 2–2 with a 5.40 ERA. In his debut against Austin Peay, he struck out five of six batters in two flawless innings. As a relief pitcher in his sophomore year, he made seventeen appearances, going 4–3 with a 4.91 ERA. Later in the year, Dougherty retired fifteen consecutive batters in a surprise start in the first game of the 2022 College World Series finals, helping Ole Miss to win its first NCAA Championship and earning himself a comparison to Max Scherzer by ESPN's Ryan McGee.

== Professional career ==
Dougherty was selected by the Minnesota Twins in the ninth round, with the 267th overall pick, of the 2023 Major League Baseball draft. On July 14, 2023, Dougherty signed with the Twins for a deal worth $160,000.
