= Northside High School (Memphis, Tennessee) =

Defunct high school in Tennessee, USA

Coordinates: 35.1665°N 90.0165°W

- Memphis, Shelby County, Tennessee; United States

Information
- Established: 1968
- Closed: 2016
- School district: Shelby County Schools (previously Memphis City Schools)

Northside High School was a high school in the Klondike neighborhood of Memphis, Tennessee that closed in 2016. It was operated by Shelby County Schools and was previously in Memphis City Schools.

As of September 2019, Urban Renaissance Inc. wants to buy the building to provide space for community groups and small businesses as the meal preparation that had been done there by Shelby County would be moving to another location.

This school was built in 1968 in the Memphis City Schools system and served almost 350 students and 200 teachers in its first school year.

== Notable alumni ==
- Mike Hegman, American football player for the Dallas Cowboys.
- Juicy J, American rapper.
- Sharika Nelvis, American hurdling champion.
- Patrick Robinson, American football wide receiver for the Cincinnati Bengals and Arizona Cardinals.
- James Wade (basketball), American-French basketball assistant coach for the Toronto Raptors.
