= Houston High School (Tennessee) =

Location
- 9755 Wolf River Blvd. Germantown, Tennessee; United States; 35.09468°N 89.73741°W

Information
- Type: Public High School
- Motto: "The Best Getting Better"
- Established: 1989
- Founder: Shelby County Schools
- Status: Open
- School district: Germantown Municipal School District
- Principal: Hallie Ross
- Faculty: 130 (2011)
- Teaching staff: 110.50 (on an FTE basis)
- Grades: 9–12
- Enrollment: 1,932 (2023-2024)
- Student to teacher ratio: 17.48
- Colors: Black & Silver
- Mascot: Mustang
- Rival: Collierville High School

Houston High School is a public high school located in Germantown, Tennessee, serving students in grades 9–12. The school was previously one of the eight high schools operating in the Shelby County School District. The principal is Hallie Ross. Houston Middle School and Riverdale Elementary (K-8) are the main feeder schools to Houston High since the creation of the Germantown Municipal School District in June 2014.

== History ==
Houston High School was established in 1989 and is the sole high school of the Germantown Municipal School District (GMSD). Prior to June 2014, HHS was part of the Shelby County Schools system. The GMSD is a family of five schools, Dogwood Elementary (K–5), Farmington Elementary (K–5), Riverdale Elementary (K–8), Houston Middle School (6–8), and Houston High School (9–12). HHS offers nearly 25 Advanced Placement courses, being one of four schools in the state to offer the AP Capstone Diploma, and has approximately 200 students in the ACT "30 and Above" Club. HHS athletic teams have earned 34 TSSAA state championships, including three girls state championships during the fall of 2015 (cross country, golf, and soccer), and have received "Best of the Preps" recognition in suburban Shelby County for the last eighteen years (1999–2016). HHS offers more than 60 clubs and activities.

In May 2018, the choir teacher was accused of having inappropriate interactions with students, and the principal was accused of inappropriate acts at a teacher's home. The principal resigned, and the choir teacher was fired, but later cleared of wrongdoing.

=== 1994 tornado ===
On November 27, 1994, a strong F2 tornado tore through the school and the surrounding area. Large sections of wall, windows, and parts of the roof were severely damaged. The damage was so great that the school was condemned, and the next month was spent making repairs. Students were bused to nearby Germantown High School during the repairs.

== Athletics ==
HHS athletic teams have earned 34 TSSAA state championships, including three girls state championships during the fall of 2015 (cross country, golf, and soccer), and have received "Best of the Preps" recognition in suburban Shelby County for the last eighteen years (1999–2016).

The Houston Mustangs football program has produced college players, with the most notable alumni being New England Patriots Defensive Tackle David Nugent and Washington Redskins Defensive End Jeremy Jarmon. The football program won its first state championship in 2023 and was state runner up in 2024.

Former Mustang pitcher, Matt Cain, played 13 seasons in Major League Baseball (MLB) for the San Francisco Giants (Pitcher). A two-time World Series champion, Cain is regarded as a central figure of the Giants' success in the 2010s for his pitching and leadership. Cain threw the 22nd perfect game in Major League Baseball history on June 13, 2012.

Beginning with the 2020–21 season, former NBA player Mike Miller was hired as the head boys' basketball coach. He has immediately established Houston as one of the top teams in the state after recruiting several touted prospects.

== Fine arts ==
In 2015, the band traveled to New York City to perform at Carnegie Hall. The marching band has been given multiple awards, notably the Chancellor's Cup for the Large School Division in the Vanderbilt Marching Invitational for 6 of the last 8 years (as of 2014). The Houston High Vocal Program is also acclaimed, with their a cappella group winning second at Nationals.

== Notable alumni ==
- Lincoln Pare, NFL running back for the Indianapolis Colts
