= Klondike, Memphis =

Klondike
- Neighborhood
- Interactive map of Klondike
- Coordinates: 35.165°N 90.014°W
- Country: United States
- State: Tennessee
- County: Shelby
- City: Memphis
- Founded: 1890s
- Memphis City Council: District 7

Government
  - Councilwoman: Michalyn Easter-Thomas

Klondike is a neighborhood in Memphis, Tennessee. It was established in the 1890s as the first neighborhood for Black homeowners within Memphis city limits.

== Geography ==
Klondike is located in North Memphis. It is bordered by Interstate 40 to the west, Chelsea Ave. to the north, Watkins St. to the east, and Jackson Ave. to the south. To the west of Klondike is the Smokey City neighborhood, which is often grouped with Klondike.

Lick Creek runs along the west and the north sides of the neighborhood.

== History ==
In the 1890s, Klondike was developed in North Memphis. At the time of founding, the neighborhood was called Olympic Park, but was changed to Klondike as a reference to the Klondike Gold Rush, symbolic of the opportunity presented in Klondike.

One of the developers of Klondike, E.E. Meacham, had previously developed the Orange Mound neighborhood in the same decade. While Orange Mound was the first United States neighborhood designed for Black homeowners, it was a suburb outside of the Memphis city limits, whereas Klondike (Olympic Park at the time) was within the city limits. This made Klondike the first neighborhood within Memphis city limits designed for Black homeowners.

In 1925, Tom Lee rescued 32 people from the Mississippi River after their boat sank. He received a house in Klondike at 923 N Watkins St in Klondike as his reward.

In 1937, a Firestone Tire and Rubber Company plant opened in North Memphis, creating many jobs for Klondike residents.

In 1961, 4 students (Sheila and Sharon Malone, Alvin Freeman, and Pamela Mayes) integrated Memphis Public Schools at Gordon Elementary in Klondike. They are now referred to as being part of The Memphis 13, the 13 children who first integrated schools in Memphis.

In 1965, Interstate 40 was built through the center of the neighborhood, dividing it. Many residents' houses were demolished during I-40's construction.

In 1983, the Firestone plant near Klondike closed, which removed a large job center from the area. As of 2025, the old plant remains vacant.

In 1996, the Klondike neighborhood association was formed. In 2000, they merged with Smokey Cityand became the Klondike/Smokey City CDC.

In 2020, the Klondike Smokey City CDC acquired around 150 vacant lots from the Shelby County Land Bank for $225,000.

In 2022, the Klondike Community Land Trust was formed in order to keep housing affordable for its residents.

== Community ==
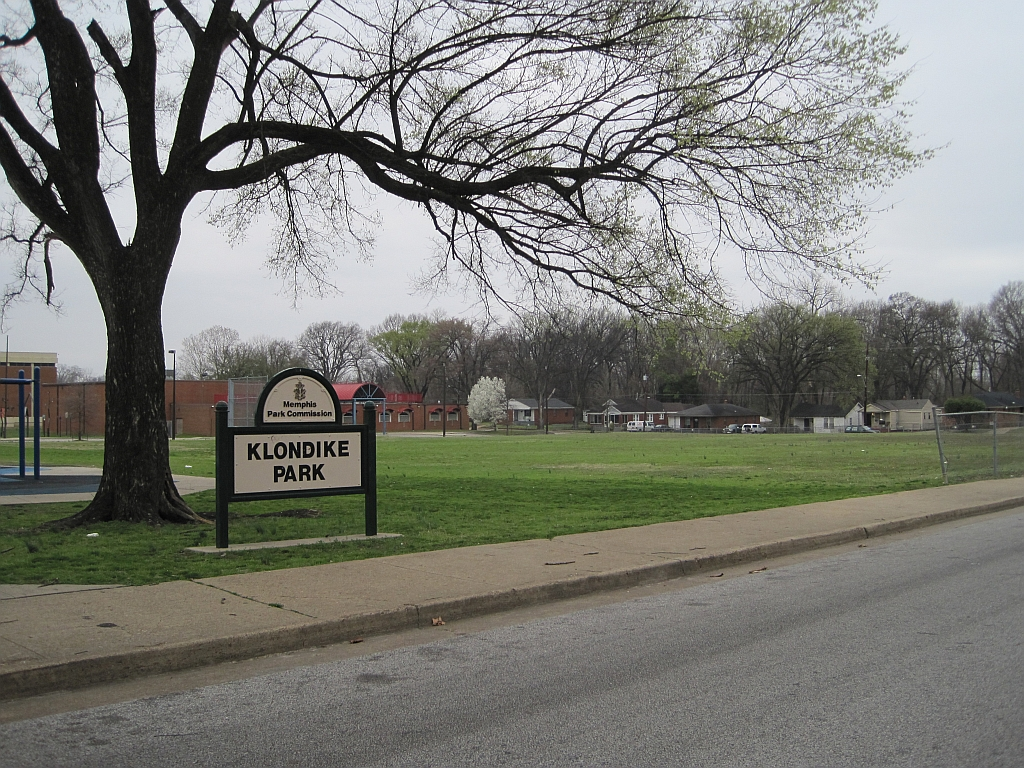
Klondike Park

Northside High School originally opened in 1967. It was the first school in Memphis that was designed to be integrated. The school closed in 2016 due to low enrollment. In 2023, development began on the Northside High School campus to create a mixed-use building featuring affordable housing units, office space, medical clinics, and other community facilities.

The Katie Sexton Community Center and Klondike Park are located at the corner of N Claybrook St and Brown Ave. The park features a playground, ball field, and picnic tables.

== Education ==
Both Perea Preschool and Perea Elementary School are located in Klondike.

The North Branch of Memphis Public Libraries is located in Klondike, adjacent to the Northside campus.

== Culture ==
Juicy J attended Northside High School.

== Notable people ==
- Mike Hegman, former NFL player.
- Juicy J, rapper.
- Tom Lee, rescued 32 people from the Mississippi River in 1925.
- Charlie Morris, civil rights leader.
- Katie Sexton, civil rights leader.
- James Wade, basketball coach.
