= Dick Davis (defensive end) =

American football player (born 1938)

No. 86
- Position: Defensive end

Personal information
- Born: February 6, 1938 (age 88); Jackson, Tennessee, U.S.
- Died: April 30, 2021 (aged 83); Lakeland, Tennessee, U.S.
- Listed height: 6 ft 2 in (1.88 m)
- Listed weight: 230 lb (104 kg)

Career information
- High school: Messick (Memphis, Tennessee)
- College: Vanderbilt (1957); Kansas (1958–1961)
- NFL draft: 1962: undrafted

Career history
- Green Bay Packers (1962)*; Dallas Texans (1962); Oakland Raiders (1963)*; Kansas City Chiefs (1963)*
- * Offseason or practice squad member only

Awards and highlights
- AFL champion (1962)
- Stats at Pro Football Reference

Richard Earl Davis (February 6, 1938 – April 30, 2021) was an American professional football defensive end who played one season with the Dallas Texans of the American Football League (AFL). He played college football at Vanderbilt University and the University of Kansas. He was a member of the Texans team that won the 1962 AFL championship.

== Early life and college ==
Richard Earl Davis was February 6, 1938, in Jackson, Tennessee. He attended Messick High School in Memphis, Tennessee.

Davis then enrolled at Vanderbilt University and was a member of the Vanderbilt Commodores freshman team in 1957. Afterwards, he transferred to play for the Kansas Jayhawks of the University of Kansas, where he was listed as ineligible in 1958. He was a three-year letterman for the Jayhawks from 1959 to 1961.

== Professional career ==
Davis signed with the Green Bay Packers of the National Football League after going undrafted in 1962. He was waived by the Packers on September 4, 1962.

Davis was signed by the Dallas Texans of the American Football League (AFL) on September 19, 1962. He played in 12 games, starting three, for the Texans during the 1962 season. He also appeared in the 1962 AFL Championship Game, a 20–17 victory over the Houston Oilers.

On April 2, 1963, Davis and Sonny Bishop were traded to the Oakland Raiders for the rights to Stone Johnson. On August 16, 1963, it was reported that Davis had been cut by the Raiders.

Davis signed with the AFL's Kansas City Chiefs on August 20, 1963, as an offensive guard. He was waived by the Chiefs on September 3, 1963.

== Death ==
Davis died on April 30, 2021, in Lakeland, Tennessee.
