= Collierville, Tennessee =

- Town
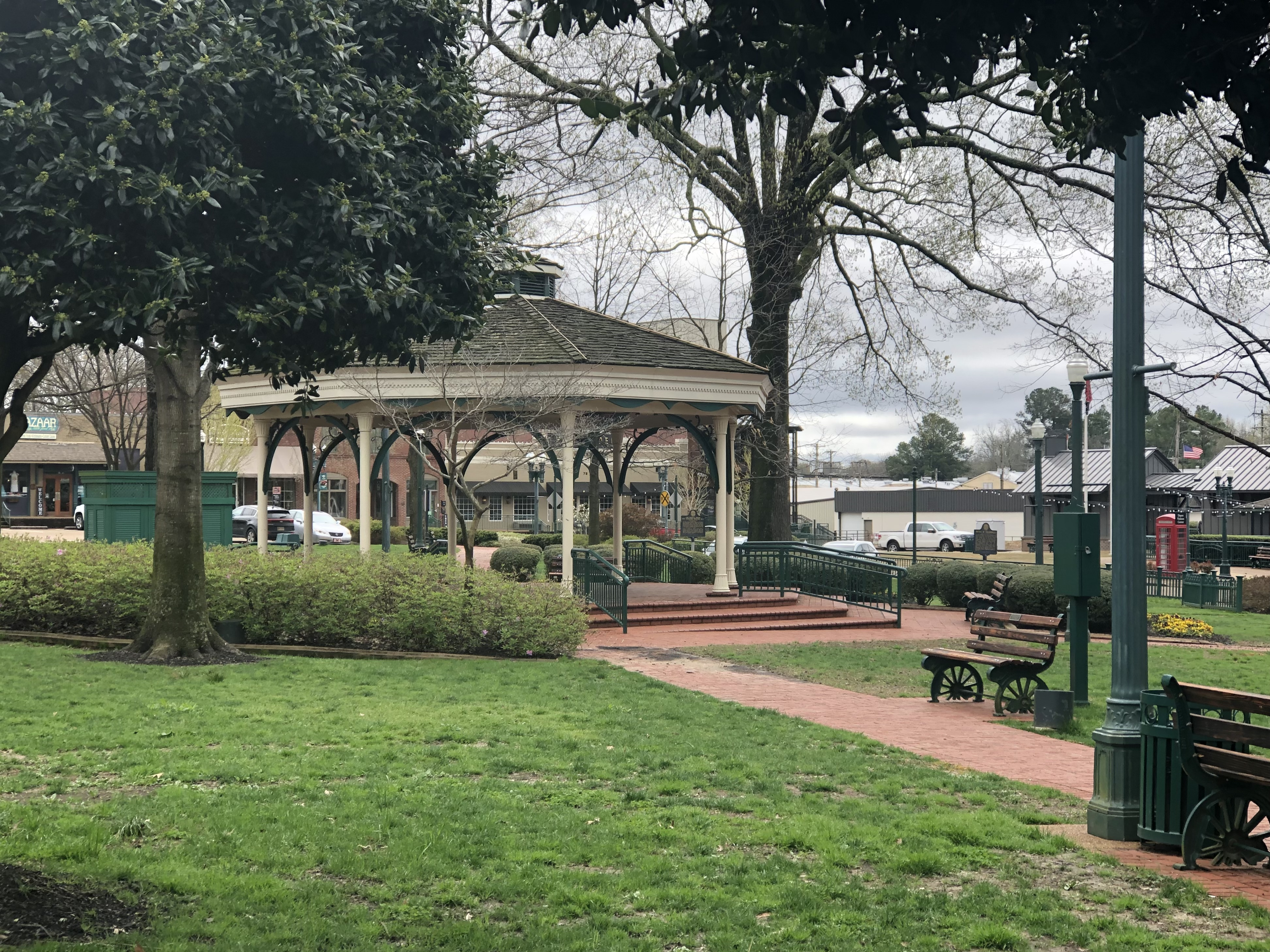
- Collierville's town square in 2020

- Flag Logo
- Motto: Industry, Community, Growth, Education
- Location of Collierville in Shelby County, Tennessee

- Location in the United States
- Coordinates: 35°02′33″N 89°39′54″W
- Country: United States
- State: Tennessee
- County: Shelby
- Founded: 1836
- Chartered: February 17, 1870
- Founder: Jesse R. Collier
- Named for: Jesse R. Collier

Government
  - Mayor: Maureen Fraser (R)
  - Town Administrator: Katrina Amos-Atkins (Interim)

Area
  - Total: 36.45 sq mi (94.41 km^{2})
  - Land: 36.37 sq mi (94.21 km^{2})
  - Water: 0.077 sq mi (0.20 km^{2})
- Elevation: 381 ft (116 m)

Population (2020)
  - Total: 51,324
  - Density: 1,411.0/sq mi (544.78/km^{2})
- Time zone: UTC-6 (Central (CST))
  - Summer (DST): UTC-5 (CDT)
- ZIP codes: 38017, 38027
- Area code: 901
- FIPS code: 47-16420
- GNIS feature ID: 1280985
- Website: www.colliervilletn.gov

Collierville (/ˌkɔːljərvɪl/ "call your ville" or /ˌkɔːljɜːrvɪl/ "call yer ville"), officially the Town of Collierville, is a town in Shelby County, Tennessee, United States, and a suburb located in the Memphis metropolitan area. With a population of 51,324 in the 2020 census, Collierville is the third-largest municipality in the county after Memphis and Bartlett. It is home to the Carriage Crossing shopping mall and is served by Collierville Schools.

Founded by 19th-century businessman Jesse R. Collier in 1836, the settlement was the site of the first and second battles of Collierville during the American Civil War, during which the town suffered severe damage. After a period of regrowth, Collierville saw substantial economic expansion in the twentieth and twenty-first centuries and now boasts a high quality of life.

Downtown Collierville is listed on the National Register of Historic Places, and in 2014 Collierville's historic town square was ranked by Parade as the "Best Main Street" in America.

== History ==
The second oldest town in Shelby County, Collierville was laid out in 1836 and named after 19th century businessman Jesse R. Collier, who bought land and advertised it as "The Town of Collier". The original town was chartered in 1850 during the Richard Ramsey mayoral administration.

=== American Civil War ===
Two significant battles were fought at Collierville during the American Civil War. The first came on October 11, 1863, when Confederate Brigadier-General James Chalmers's division of 3,000 cavalrymen attacked the U.S. federal garrison protecting the Memphis and Charleston Railroad. The garrison, defended by U.S. Army Major-General William T. Sherman, successfully repulsed the Confederates.

The second battle was fought on November 3, 1863, when Chalmers was again repulsed, this time by Colonel Edward Hatch. Chalmers withdrew a second time to North Mississippi. The railroad remained open to Tuscumbia, Alabama, for federal troop movements. Estimated casualties were 60 on the side of the Union and 95 on the side of the Confederacy. Because of Sherman's participation in the first engagement, his monument in Washington, D.C. lists "Colliersville" as one of his battles. Federal commanders referred to the settlement as "Colliersville" in official reports.

Collierville sustained severe damage during the American Civil War and the original settlement was completely destroyed. Rechartered in 1870 during the James B. Abington mayoral administration; Collierville's population increased with help from the cotton, dairy, and manufacturing industries.

=== Kroger incident ===
On September 23, 2021, thirteen people were shot and two killed, including the gunman, in a mass shooting at a local Kroger store. Collierville Police Chief Dale Lane labeled it "the most horrific event that's occurred in Collierville history."

== Geography ==
Collierville is located at 35°3′16″N 89°40′56″W (35.054366, −89.682306). According to the United States Census Bureau, the town has a total area of 24.6 square miles (64 km^{2}), of which 24.5 square miles (63 km^{2}) is land and 0.1 square miles (0.26 km^{2}), or 0.41%, is water.

=== Major thoroughfares ===
- Interstate 269
- Nonconnah/Bill Morris Parkway (State Route 385)
- U. S. Route 72 (Poplar Avenue)/Tennessee State Route 86
- State Route 57 (Poplar Avenue)
- State Route 175 (Byhalia Road, Collierville Road, S Houston Levee Road, and E Shelby Drive)
- State Route 205 (Collierville-Arlington Road)

== Climate ==
Collierville has a humid subtropical climate, with four distinct seasons. The summer months (late May to late September) are persistently hot (between 68 °F (20 °C) and 95 °F (35 °C)) and humid due to moisture encroaching from the Gulf of Mexico. Afternoon thunderstorms are frequent during some summers, but usually brief, lasting no longer than an hour. Early Autumn is pleasantly drier and mild, but can remain hot until late October.

Abrupt but short-lived cold snaps are common. Late Autumn is rainy and colder, with December being the third rainiest month of the year. Fall foliage becomes especially vibrant after the first frost, typically November, and lasts until early December. Winters are mild, but cold snaps can occur. The official all-time record low temperature was −13.0 °F (−25.0 °C), which occurred on December 24, 1963. Mild spells are sometimes warm with temperatures as high as 75 °F (23 °C) during January and February. Snowfall is not abundant but does occur during most winters, with an annual average of 5.7 inches (14.4 cm) at the airport.

Spring often begins in late February or early March, following the onset of a sharp warmup. This season is also known as "severe weather season" due to the higher frequency of tornadoes, hail, and thunderstorms producing winds greater than 58 mph (93 km/h). Collierville is above the Tennessee state average for Tornado activity, and 188% of the average for the US. Historically, April is the month with the highest frequency of tornadoes, though tornadoes have occurred every month of the year.

Collierville is sunny approximately 64% of the time. Average rainfall is slightly higher during the spring months than the rest of the year, but not to any noticeable extent. Collierville receives around 55 inches of rainfall every year.

Climate data for Collierville, Tennessee, 1991–2020 normals, extremes 1996–2021
Month	Jan	Feb	Mar	Apr	May	Jun	Jul	Aug	Sep	Oct	Nov	Dec	Year
Record high °F (°C)	76 (24)	79 (26)	86 (30)	93 (34)	95 (35)	101 (38)	103 (39)	106 (41)	100 (38)	97 (36)	87 (31)	78 (26)	106 (41)
Mean maximum °F (°C)	68.9 (20.5)	72.3 (22.4)	80.7 (27.1)	86.1 (30.1)	90.9 (32.7)	95.3 (35.2)	97.4 (36.3)	98.1 (36.7)	94.1 (34.5)	88.9 (31.6)	78.3 (25.7)	71.9 (22.2)	99.3 (37.4)
Mean daily maximum °F (°C)	50.0 (10.0)	54.7 (12.6)	63.8 (17.7)	73.4 (23.0)	81.8 (27.7)	88.2 (31.2)	91.4 (33.0)	90.6 (32.6)	84.9 (29.4)	75.2 (24.0)	63.2 (17.3)	53.5 (11.9)	72.6 (22.5)
Daily mean °F (°C)	39.6 (4.2)	43.5 (6.4)	52.1 (11.2)	61.1 (16.2)	70.2 (21.2)	77.4 (25.2)	80.9 (27.2)	79.5 (26.4)	72.9 (22.7)	61.8 (16.6)	50.9 (10.5)	43.2 (6.2)	61.1 (16.2)
Mean daily minimum °F (°C)	29.1 (−1.6)	32.4 (0.2)	40.4 (4.7)	48.7 (9.3)	58.6 (14.8)	66.7 (19.3)	70.3 (21.3)	68.4 (20.2)	60.8 (16.0)	48.5 (9.2)	38.7 (3.7)	32.8 (0.4)	49.6 (9.8)
Mean minimum °F (°C)	13.7 (−10.2)	17.8 (−7.9)	23.9 (−4.5)	34.0 (1.1)	44.9 (7.2)	57.5 (14.2)	62.3 (16.8)	60.2 (15.7)	49.9 (9.9)	33.6 (0.9)	24.3 (−4.3)	18.9 (−7.3)	11.7 (−11.3)
Record low °F (°C)	5 (−15)	8 (−13)	12 (−11)	26 (−3)	37 (3)	47 (8)	58 (14)	50 (10)	38 (3)	28 (−2)	15 (−9)	12 (−11)	5 (−15)
Average precipitation inches (mm)	4.41 (112)	4.97 (126)	5.56 (141)	5.69 (145)	5.75 (146)	4.19 (106)	4.94 (125)	3.43 (87)	3.72 (94)	4.19 (106)	4.28 (109)	5.83 (148)	56.96 (1,445)
Average snowfall inches (cm)	0.7 (1.8)	0.5 (1.3)	0.2 (0.51)	0.0 (0.0)	0.0 (0.0)	0.0 (0.0)	0.0 (0.0)	0.0 (0.0)	0.0 (0.0)	0.0 (0.0)	0.0 (0.0)	0.0 (0.0)	1.4 (3.61)
Average precipitation days (≥ 0.01 in)	11.2	10.2	12.1	10.4	10.1	8.0	8.3	7.6	7.3	8.1	9.5	11.1	113.9
Average snowy days (≥ 0.1 in)	0.5	0.4	0.1	0.0	0.0	0.0	0.0	0.0	0.0	0.0	0.0	0.0	1.0
Source 1: NOAA
Source 2: XMACIS2 (mean maxima/minima 2006–2020)

== Demographics ==
Collierville, Tennessee – Racial and ethnic composition Note: the US Census treats Hispanic/Latino as an ethnic category. This table excludes Latinos from the racial categories and assigns them to a separate category. Hispanics/Latinos may be of any race.
Race / Ethnicity (NH = Non-Hispanic)	Pop 2000	Pop 2010	Pop 2020	% 2000	% 2010	% 2020
White alone (NH)	28,337	34,344	34,506	88.91%	78.12%	67.23%
Black or African American alone (NH)	2,332	4,740	5,995	7.32%	10.78%	11.68%
Native American or Alaska Native alone (NH)	55	64	72	0.17%	0.15%	0.14%
Asian alone (NH)	461	3,111	6,539	1.45%	7.08%	12.74%
Native Hawaiian or Pacific Islander alone (NH)	4	12	16	0.01%	0.03%	0.03%
Other race alone (NH)	9	76	180	0.03%	0.17%	0.35%
Mixed race or Multiracial (NH)	193	464	1,823	0.61%	1.06%	3.55%
Hispanic or Latino (any race)	481	1,154	2,193	1.51%	2.62%	4.27%
Total	31,872	43,965	51,324	100.00%	100.00%	100.00%

Historical population
Census	Pop.	Note	%±
1850	236		—
1870	274		—
1880	753		174.8%
1890	696		−7.6%
1900	829		19.1%
1910	802		−3.3%
1920	989		23.3%
1930	1,008		1.9%
1940	1,042		3.4%
1950	1,153		10.7%
1960	2,020		75.2%
1970	3,651		80.7%
1980	7,839		114.7%
1990	14,427		84.0%
2000	31,872		120.9%
2010	43,965		37.9%
2020	51,324		16.7%
2025 (est.)	51,909	▲	1.1%

=== 2020 census ===
As of the 2020 census, Collierville had a population of 51,324 people, with 18,142 households and 14,078 families residing in the town. The median age was 40.7 years. 25.4% of residents were under the age of 18 and 15.3% were 65 years of age or older. For every 100 females there were 93.0 males, and for every 100 females age 18 and over there were 90.3 males age 18 and over.

97.5% of residents lived in urban areas, while 2.5% lived in rural areas.

There were 18,800 housing units, of which 3.5% were vacant. The homeowner vacancy rate was 1.2% and the rental vacancy rate was 5.9%. Of all households, 40.0% had children under the age of 18 living in them, 68.0% were married-couple households, 9.7% were households with a male householder and no spouse or partner present, and 20.0% were households with a female householder and no spouse or partner present. About 17.8% of all households were made up of individuals and 8.6% had someone living alone who was 65 years of age or older.

Collierville racial composition
Race	Num.	Perc.
White (non-Hispanic)	34,506	67.23%
Black or African American (non-Hispanic)	5,995	11.68%
Native American	72	0.14%
Asian	6,539	12.74%
Pacific Islander	16	0.03%
Other/Mixed	2,003	3.9%
Hispanic or Latino	2,193	4.27%

=== 2019 estimates ===
In 2019, 18.2% of households were non-families. The average household size was 2.91 and the average family size was 3.27.

In 2019, 4.8% of the population was from ages 20 to 24, 24.1% was from 25 to 44, and 29.4% was from 45 to 64.

== Economy ==
Collierville is part of the Memphis, TN-MS-AR metropolitan area. As such, the town's economy is highly interconnected with the greater Memphis region. Notable employers include regional leaders like FedEx, while local manufacturing facilities, such as Carrier, bring workers to the town. Approximately 67.2% of the town's population is in the civilian labor force (i.e., the share of the town's population over the age of 16 that is employed or unemployed but searching for employment), and about 3.9% of the town's population lived below the poverty line in 2019.

=== Household Income ===
Median Income in Collierville
Year	Median Income ($)	Margin of error (±$)
2013	101,000	4,051
2014	106,783	5,316
2015	110,084	6,175
2016	110,591	6,205
2017	113,957	6,842
2019	113,996	4,551

In 2019, approximately 56.6% of the town's population earned more than $100,000, with 23.9% earning between $100,000 and $149,999, 14.1% earning between $150,000 and $199,999, and 18.2% earning above $200,000.

=== Housing ===
The average value of housing in Collierville, TN in 2017 was estimated to be $286,700, whereas market listings in 2021 estimate a value of approximately $433,000 following a steep increase in housing prices.

== Education ==
Of residents 25 years of age and older, 96% have a high school diploma or higher, 51.8% have a bachelor's degree or higher, and 18.2% have a graduate or professional degree. Of current students, 95.6% attend public schools and 4.4% attend private schools. Public schools have been under the jurisdiction of Collierville Schools since 2014, before which Collierville was served by Shelby County Schools until an August 2012 vote that passed with 10,615 (87%) votes to 1,519 (13%) laid the foundation for an independent district. Private schools include St. George's Independent School, the Goddard School, Central Learning Center, Collierville Methodist Preschool, and Incarnation Catholic School. In higher education, the University of Memphis formerly had a Collierville branch located on Poplar Avenue.

=== Elementary schools ===
- Bailey Station Elementary School
- Collierville Elementary School
- Crosswind Elementary School
- Sycamore Elementary School
- Tara Oaks Elementary School
- Schilling Farms Elementary School

=== Middle schools ===
- Collierville Middle School
- West Collierville Middle School

=== High schools ===
- Collierville High School

== Culture ==
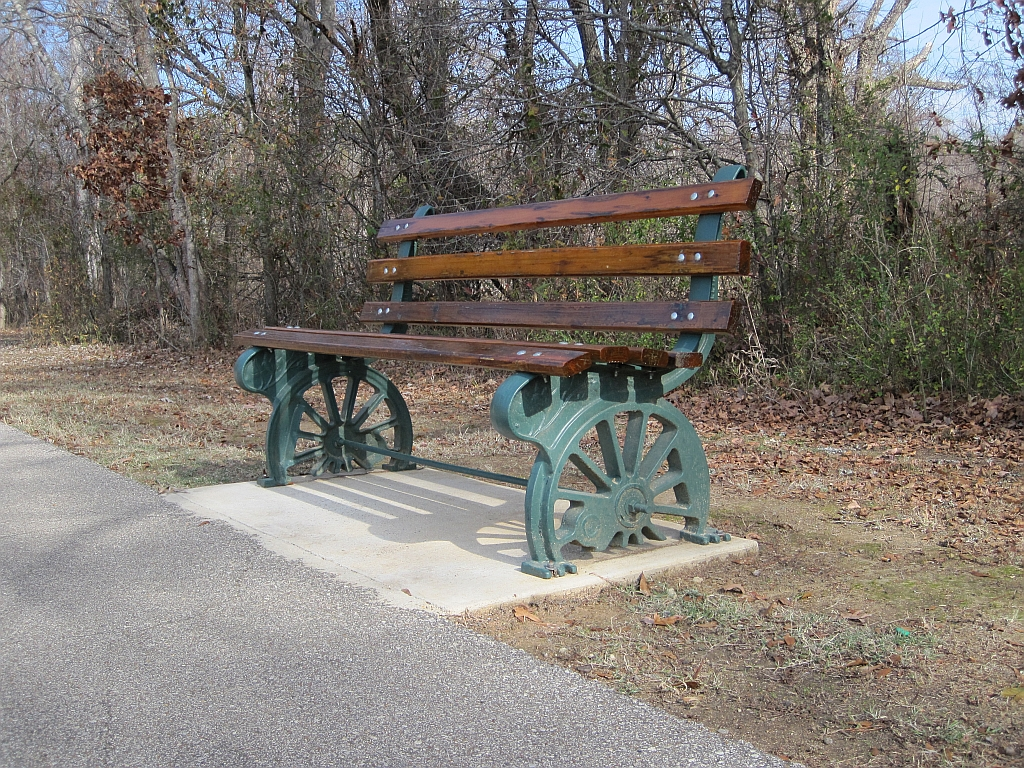
An old wagon trail bench, which is common throughout Collierville

Collierville's downtown area and town square have been on the National Register of Historic Places since 1990, and the Morton Museum of Collierville maintains a collection of the town's history. The Fair on the Square and the annual Symphony in the Rose Garden both take place every May in Collierville—the Fair has taken place every year since 1976. The Collierville Farmers Market has assembled in the parking lot of Collierville United Methodist Church since 2009.

The Collierville Burch Library—officially the Lucius E. and Elsie C. Burch Jr. Library—is the town's municipal library. Collierville's first library opened in 1956 with three thousand books, but despite expansions, the facility could not keep pace with its growing book collection. The current library campus, adjacent to the town hall, opened in March 2001. The Harrell Theatre—under the authority of the Collierville Arts Council, founded in 1987—is the local center for performing arts.

== Notable people ==
- Emery Adams, pitcher for the Memphis Red Sox
- Hunter Bradley, former NFL long snapper for the Green Bay Packers
- Morgan Cox, NFL long snapper for the Tennessee Titans, Super Bowl XLVII champion
- Zack Cozart, former MLB shortstop for the Cincinnati Reds
- Bill Dance, professional fisherman, Outdoor Channel TV host
- Nick Marable, folkstyle and freestyle wrestler, represented USA at 2014 World Wrestling Championships
- Nikki McCray, former WNBA basketball player and coach, Old Dominion
- Ben McDaniel, missing scuba diver
- J. Washington Moore, lawyer and politician
- Major Owens, New York politician
- Drew Pomeranz, MLB pitcher for many teams, including San Diego Padres, Colorado Rockies, and Boston Red Sox
- Olan Rogers, comedian
- Marv Throneberry, former MLB first baseman for the New York Mets

== See also ==
- First Battle of Collierville
- Second Battle of Collierville
- Collierville Schools
