= Zack Cozart =

American baseball player (born 1985)

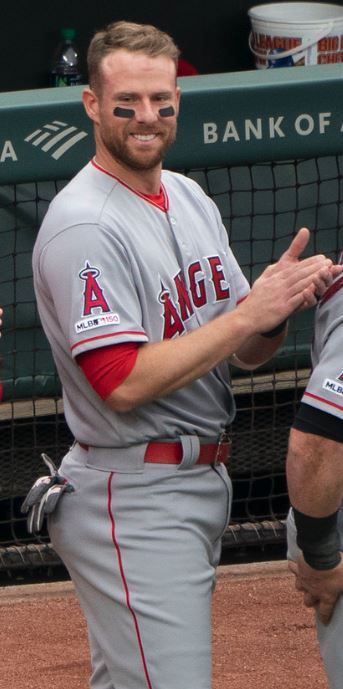
- Cozart with the Los Angeles Angels in 2019
- Shortstop
- Born: August 12, 1985 (age 40); Memphis, Tennessee, U.S.
- Batted: Right Threw: Right

MLB debut
- July 7, 2011, for the Cincinnati Reds

Last MLB appearance
- May 26, 2019, for the Los Angeles Angels

MLB statistics
- Batting average: .247
- Home runs: 87
- Runs batted in: 305
- Stats at Baseball Reference

Teams
- Cincinnati Reds (2011–2017); Los Angeles Angels (2018–2019)

Career highlights and awards
- All-Star (2017)
Medals
Men's baseball
Representing United States
World University Championship
Gold medal – first place	2006 Havana	Team

Zachary Warren Cozart (born August 12, 1985) is an American former professional baseball shortstop. He played in Major League Baseball (MLB) for the Cincinnati Reds and Los Angeles Angels.

The Reds selected Cozart in the second round of the 2007 MLB draft. He made his MLB debut with the Reds in 2011, and was named an All-Star in 2017. Cozart signed with the Angels as a free agent before the 2018 season.

== Early life and career ==
Cozart attended Collierville High School in Collierville, Tennessee, graduating in 2004. He played football, basketball, and baseball. In his senior year, he batted .443 with five home runs and 41 RBIs.

Cozart attended the University of Mississippi, where he played college baseball for the Ole Miss Rebels. Baseball America named him a third-team All-American in 2006. Cozart had a .310/.367/.473 career slash line in college.

== Professional career ==
=== Minor leagues ===
The Cincinnati Reds selected Cozart in the second round of the 2007 Major League Baseball draft. He signed for a signing bonus of $407,250. The Reds assigned Cozart to the Dayton Dragons of the Class A Midwest League. He batted .239/.288/.332 in 184 at bats for Dayton with two home runs and 18 RBIs, along with two triples.

He returned to Dayton in 2008, this time hitting .280/.330/.457 for a full season. He hit 14 home runs, including two multi-homer games and one grand slam. Cozart drove in 49 runs and hit six triples in 418 at bats. His performance earned him a trip to the Midwest League All-Star game, and he was named a Baseball America Class-A All-Star. Midwest League managers voted him the best defensive shortstop of the year. Cozart led the Dragons in batting average for the season.

The Reds promoted Cozart to the Carolina Mudcats of the Class AA Southern League for the 2009 season. He hit six of his ten home runs in June and drove in 12 runs, earning him the Reds' Minor League Player of the Month honors. He had a 13-game hitting streak from May 28 to June 9, during which he hit four home runs. Cozart finished the season hitting .262/.360/.398, with ten homers and 59 RBIs. He also had two triples and ten stolen bases. He was named a Southern League All Star. His performance earned him an invitation to the Arizona Fall League. In 13 games for the Peoria Saguaros of the AFL, he hit .340/.393/.560 with two home runs, ten RBIs, and three stolen bases.

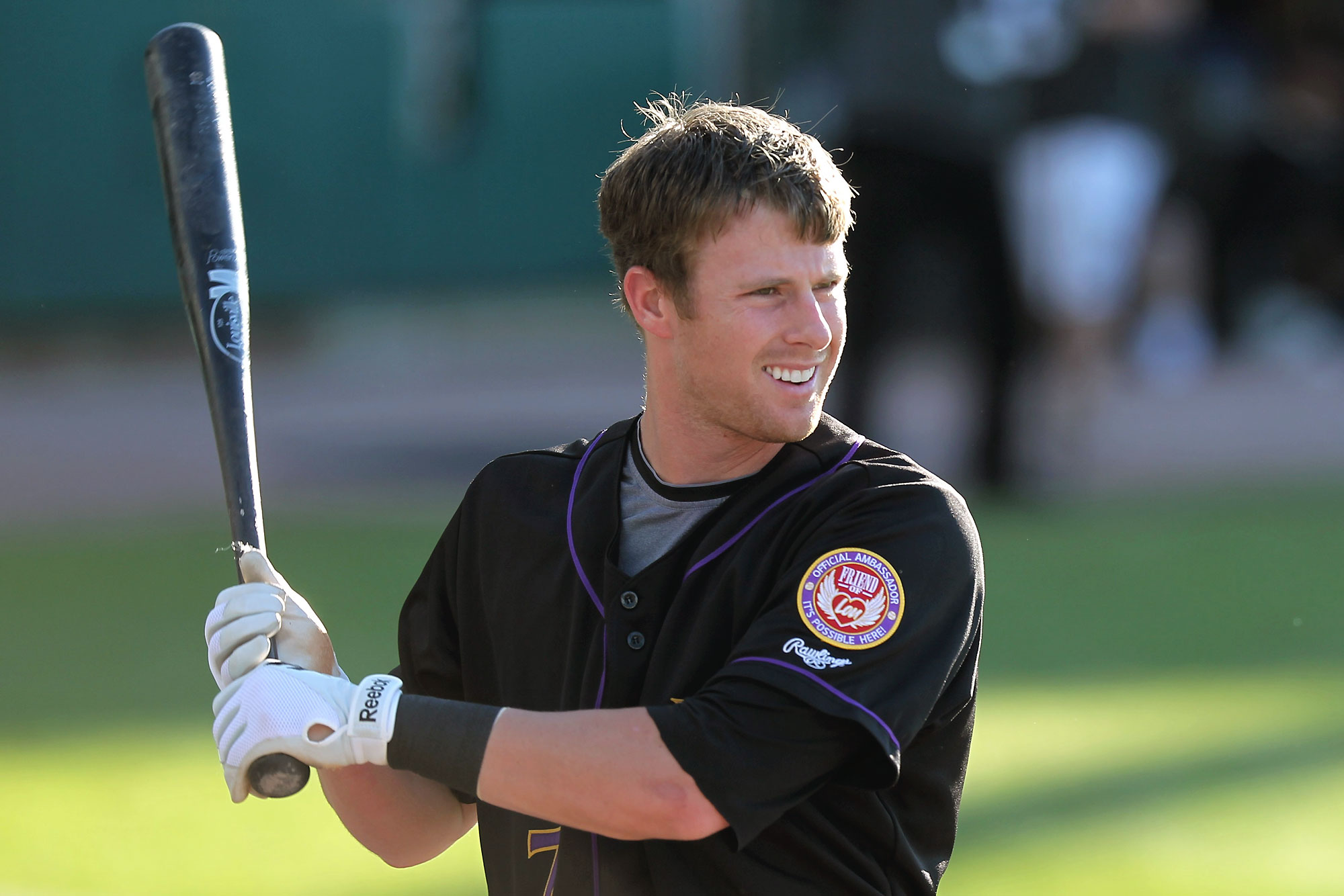
Cozart with the Louisville Bats in 2010

The Reds invited Cozart to spring training in 2010. He spent the season with the Louisville Bats of the Class AAA International League, hitting .255/.310/.416 in 553 at bats (first in the International League) with 91 runs (leading the league), four triples and 30 stolen bases (tied for 5th in the league; the fourth-most by any Reds minor league player). Cozart put up career highs in power with 17 home runs and 67 RBIs. He was named a Baseball America Triple-A All-Star for 2010, and received the Mary E. Barney Award as Louisville's Most Valuable Player. As one of six players to spend all of the season with Louisville, he was fourth in the International League in games (136) and fifth in hits (141). He also led all IL shortstops with a .977 fielding percentage. Cozart was rated the 10th-best prospect in the Reds organization. On November 19 he was added to the Reds' 40-man roster.

=== Cincinnati Reds ===
==== 2011 ====
He was placed on the Reds 40-man roster after the 2010 season, but was optioned to Louisville on March 21, 2011. Cozart enjoyed a hot start to 2011, hitting .310/.357/.467 through his first 77 games. He went 100-for-323 with 26 doubles, two triples, seven homers, and 32 RBIs, along with nine steals. The Reds shortstops, Paul Janish and Édgar Rentería, were hitting a combined .226 with one homer and 29 RBI through July 6, and Reds fans everywhere were calling for a change at shortstop. On July 7, 2011, less than 24 hours after an article on Reds.com said there would be no transaction, the Reds optioned Janish and recalled Cozart. Switching uniform numbers from #60 to #2, Cozart started that night at Milwaukee, playing shortstop and batting seventh. In his debut game, he went 1–3 with a run scored. Cozart hit his first home run in the eighth inning off of his college teammate Lance Lynn, on July 17, against the rival Cardinals. He had 10 hits in his first 25 Major League at bats, and at least one hit in each of his first 6 games.

On July 23, in a game against the Atlanta Braves, Cozart hyperextended his left elbow on a play at second. Joey Votto fielded a bunt and threw to second. Cozart covered second and had to reach into the line of the runner, Nate McLouth, to field the throw. McLouth slid into Cozart's arm, hyperextending the latter's elbow. Replays showed that McLouth would likely have been safe anyway. On August 12, Cozart had Tommy John surgery to repair the torn ulnar collateral ligament in his left elbow, ending his season. In 11 Major League games, Cozart batted .324/.324/.486 with 2 home runs and 3 RBIs.

==== 2012 ====
Cozart was named the opening day starting shortstop for the Reds on April 5, 2012. The Reds won that game 4–0 with Cozart going 2–4. On April 7, Cozart went 3–4 with a single, triple, and a home run going a double shy of the cycle in the Reds 8–3 loss. In 138 games, he finished the year batting .246/.288/.399 with 33 doubles, 15 home runs, and 35 RBIs.

==== 2013 ====
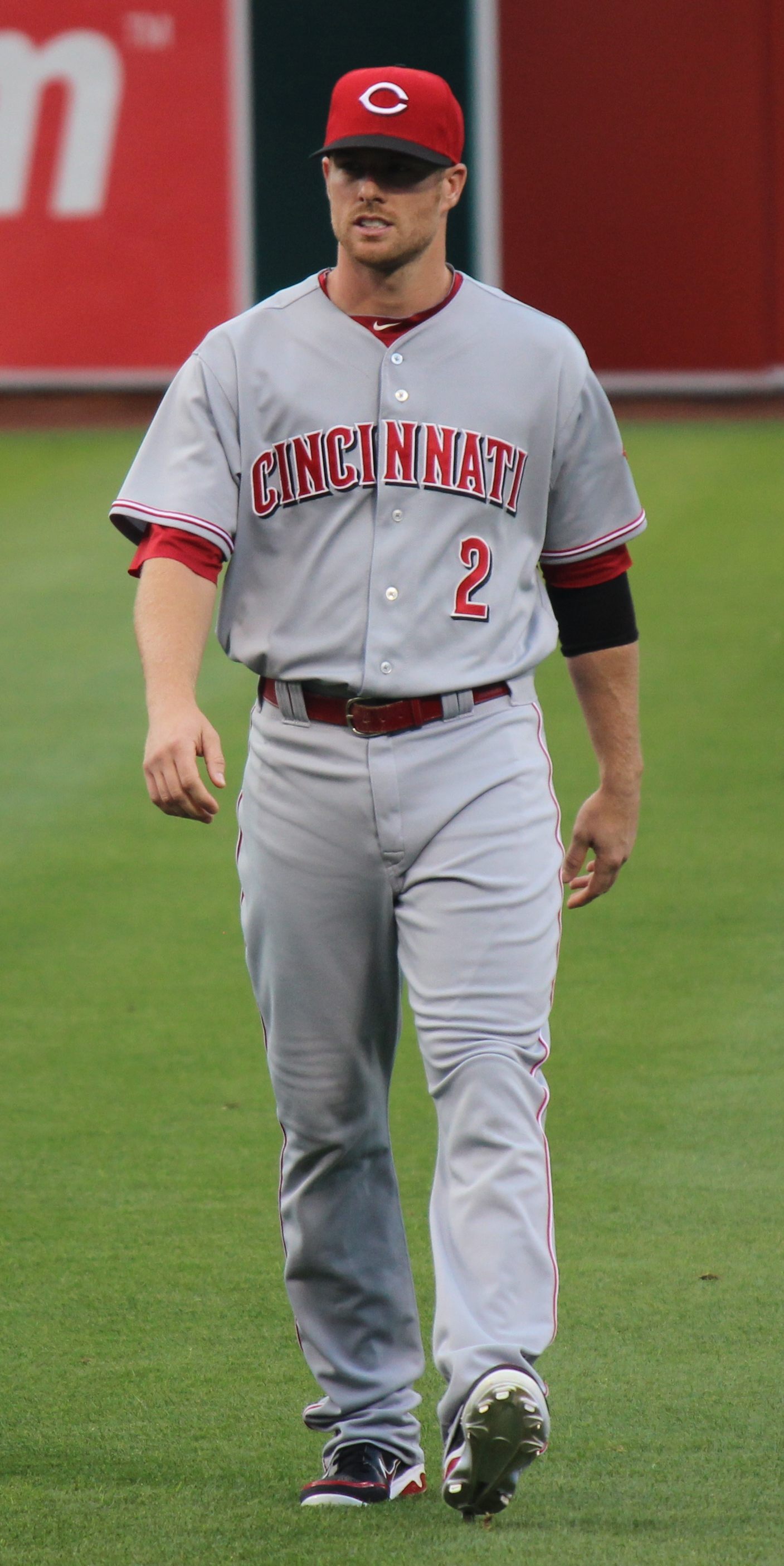
Cozart with the Cincinnati Reds in 2013

In 2013, Cozart batted .254/.284/.381 with 30 doubles, 12 home runs, and 63 RBIs in 151 games. He also led the National League with 10 sacrifice flies.

==== 2014 ====
Cozart had a down year at the plate in 2014, batting only .221/.268/.300, with both his on base percentage and his slugging percentage the lowest of all qualified MLB batters, and posting lower offensive numbers in nearly every statistical category. On October 23, 2014, he was nominated for the Gold Glove for National League Shortstops. In 147 games, he had 4 home runs and 38 RBIs.

==== 2015 ====
In 2015, Cozart got off to a solid start. On June 10, during a game against the Philadelphia Phillies, Cozart slipped on first base, tearing the anterior cruciate and lateral collateral ligaments and the biceps tendon in his right knee. He would need reconstructive surgery following the injury, causing him to miss the remainder of the season. He batted .258/.310/.459 with 9 home runs in 53 games.

==== 2016 ====
On April 4, 2016, Cozart batted leadoff on opening day for the Reds and went 3-for-3 with 2 doubles and an RBI in a 6–2 win over the Phillies. He finished 2016 batting .252/.308/.425 while hitting a career-high 16 home runs and 50 RBIs in 121 games. Despite all that, Cozart was hampered by the complications from the surgery on his knee in 2015, which eventually caused patellar tendinitis in his right knee and caused him to miss the final three weeks of the season.

==== 2017 ====
Cozart had another career year with the Reds in 2017, batting .297/.385/.548 and setting career highs in home runs (24), triples (7; tied for 5th in the NL), and runs scored (80), while tying a career high with 63 RBIs in 122 games. He ranked among overall NL leaders in slugging percentage (10th), average vs LHP (.337, 6th), and hardest to GIDP (87.6 AB, 10th). He was voted to his first-ever All-Star game as a player and a starter for the NL. However, he played through most of the season with a quad injury, which caused him to serve two stints on the disabled list. He became a free agent after the season.

=== Los Angeles Angels ===
On December 15, 2017, Cozart signed a three-year, $38 million contract with the Los Angeles Angels.

==== 2018 ====
On June 13, 2018, Cozart left a game with a shoulder subluxation while diving for a ball. Two weeks after his injury, it was revealed that he had suffered a torn labrum in his left shoulder, and he underwent season-ending surgery. Cozart finished his first season with the Angels batting .219/.296/.362 with 5 home runs and 19 RBIs in 58 games. He played third base, second base, and shortstop.

==== 2019 ====
On April 25, 2019, Cozart was placed on the injured list due to a neck strain. He was hitting .109 through the first month of the season, playing primarily third base. On July 12, it was announced that he would require surgery on his injured left shoulder and would miss the remainder of the season. For the season, he batted .124/.178/.144 with no home runs and 7 RBIs in 28 games.

On December 10, 2019, Cozart and Will Wilson were traded to the San Francisco Giants in exchange for a player to be named later or cash considerations. He was released by the Giants on January 15, 2020.

== Personal life ==
Cozart lives in Brentwood, Tennessee. He and his wife, Chelsea, have a son, Cooper.

In July 2024, Cozart said he supported Donald Trump's 2024 bid for the White House and plans to vote for him in the 2024 presidential election.

=== Social media comments on LGBTQ+ awareness day ===
In October 2024, Cozart responded to the Red's tweet on Twitter, where the team had tweeted in support of Spirit Day, an annual LGBTQ+ awareness day. The tweet's caption read: "The Reds join MLB in going purple today in honor of #SpiritDay! We are proud to support LGBTQ youth and speak out against bullying." He replied: "This sh*t [sic] is getting ridiculous... so sick of it... how many months and days do we celebrate real heroes of the military?" After facing criticism, he tweeted: "I'm never on board with s*xu*lizing [sic] kids never."
