= William Fones =

American judge

Associate Justice of the Tennessee Supreme Court
- In office 1973–1990

Personal details
- Born: October 6, 1917 Friendship, Tennessee, U.S.
- Died: December 23, 2010 (aged 93) Memphis, Tennessee, U.S.
- Spouse: Rebecca Barr (died 2000)
- Children: 2
- Education: Messick High School; West Tennessee State Teachers College; University of Tennessee
- Profession: Jurist

Military service
- Allegiance: United States
- Branch/service: United States Army
- Unit: Fifth Air Force
- Battles/wars: World War II

William Hardin Davis Fones (October 6, 1917 – December 23, 2010) was an American jurist who served on the state supreme court of Tennessee.

Fones was born in Friendship, Tennessee, and moved to Memphis with his family during the Depression. In Memphis he was educated at Messick High School and West Tennessee State Teachers College, which later became the University of Memphis. After college he studied law at the University of Tennessee, graduating before the United States entered World War II. Immediately after the attack on Pearl Harbor he enlisted in the U.S. Army, becoming a bomber pilot for the Fifth Army Air Force and flying 90 combat missions in the Pacific.

Upon returning to civilian life after World War II, Fones commenced the private practice of law in Memphis. He spent 25 years with the firm of Rosenfield, Borod, Fones, Bogatin & Kremer, leaving in 1971 to assume a circuit court judgeship.

In 1973, Fones was appointed an associate justice of the Tennessee Supreme Court by governor Winfield Dunn, a Republican. In 1974, after the Tennessee General Assembly repealed the law adopting the Modified Missouri Plan for appointment of state supreme court judges, a partisan election was held for all five seats on the court. Fones, who declared himself a political independent, stood for election and became the only incumbent among five candidates endorsed by the Democratic Party. The Democratic slate won the election and Fones was to remain on the court until his retirement in 1990, including service as chief justice.

Fones' tenure on the Tennessee Supreme Court is considered to have been a progressive period for the court. The court modernized Tennessee law, introducing new rules of evidence and new procedures for criminal and appellate courts, and it convinced the Tennessee General Assembly to establish a public defender system. Among its decisions were rulings that overturned statutes found to impose a gender bias, including a law requiring married women to take their husbands' surnames and provisions of workers' compensation statutes that directed that male surviving spouses be treated differently from female surviving spouses. Other noteworthy decisions expanded the right to sue for negligence, upheld a state open meetings law, threw out Tennessee's death penalty law due to a U.S. Supreme Court decision that had found mandatory death penalties to be unconstitutional, established that judges deciding child custody cases should consider the "best interest of the child," and upheld a ban on the practice of snake handling during religious services.

Fones was married for more than 50 years to the former Rebecca Barr, who died in 2000. They had two children.

Fones died in Memphis on December 23, 2010, following a long illness.
