= Carriage Crossing =

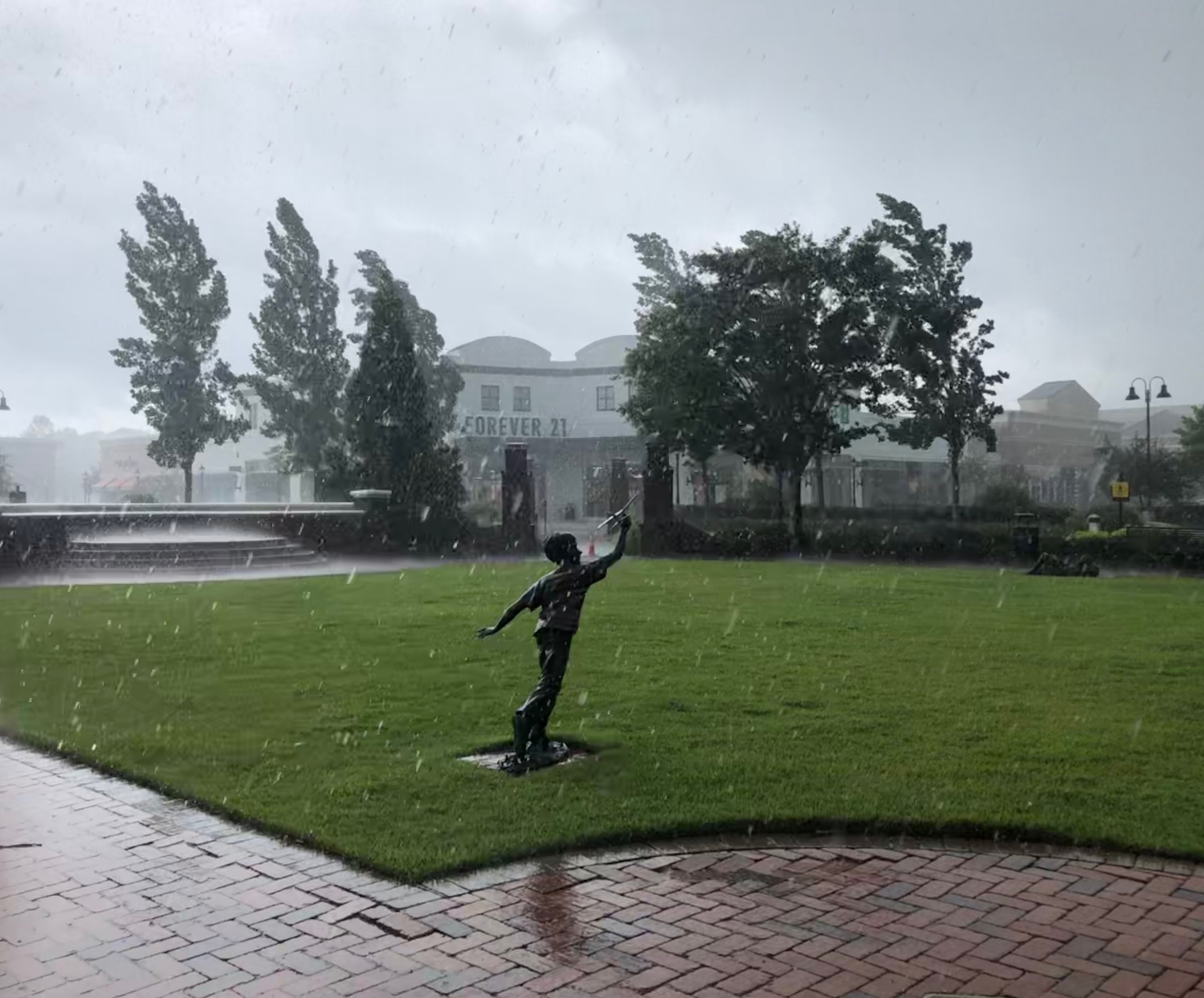
- Carriage Crossing in rain, July 2019
- Location: Collierville, Tennessee, United States
- Coordinates: 35°1′21.36″N 89°43′20″W
- Address: Tennessee State Route 385 (Bill Morris Pkwy) @ Houston Levee Road
- Opened: October 2005
- Developer: Cousins Properties & Faison Enterprises
- Manager: Poag Shopping Centers
- Owner: DRA Advisors & PM Lifestyle Centers
- Num. of stores: 110 stores
- Num. of anchor tenants: 2 (1 open, 1 vacant by April 2021)
- Floor area: 787,000 square feet (73,100 m^{2}) (GLA)
- Floors: 1
- Website: shopcarriagecrossing.com

Carriage Crossing is an open-air regional lifestyle shopping center in suburban Collierville, Tennessee outside Memphis, Tennessee. The property was originally developed by Cousins Properties as the Avenue Carriage Crossing, opening in 2005. In 2012, DRA Advisors partnered with PM Lifestyle Centers to purchase the property for $55 million. The anchor stores are Dillard's and Mid-South Furniture.

== Anchors ==
- Dillard's (200,000 sq ft (19,000 m^{2}))
- Mid-South Furniture (130,000 sq ft (12,000 m^{2})) (originally Parisian and Macy's)

== See also ==
List of shopping malls in Tennessee
