= WQOX =

Radio station of Shelby County Schools in Memphis, Tennessee

- Memphis, Tennessee; United States
- Broadcast area: Memphis
- Frequency: 88.5 MHz
- Branding: 88.5 the Voice of MSCS

Programming
- Format: Urban Adult Contemporary

Ownership
- Owner: Memphis-Shelby County Schools

Technical information
- Licensing authority: FCC
- Facility ID: 41147
- Class: C2
- ERP: 30,000 watts
- HAAT: 131.0 meters
- Transmitter coordinates: 35°9′17.00″N 89°49′20.00″W

Links
- Public license information: Public file; LMS
- Webcast: http://tunein.com/tuner/?StationId=22230&
- Website: WQOX Website

WQOX (88.5 FM) is a radio station broadcasting an Urban Adult Contemporary format. Licensed to Memphis, Tennessee, United States, the station is currently owned by Memphis-Shelby County Schools. The station's studios are located at the Communications Center (adjacent to MSCS headquarters) in Midtown Memphis, and its transmitter is in Cordova, Tennessee.
