= James Wade (basketball) =

American-French basketball coach

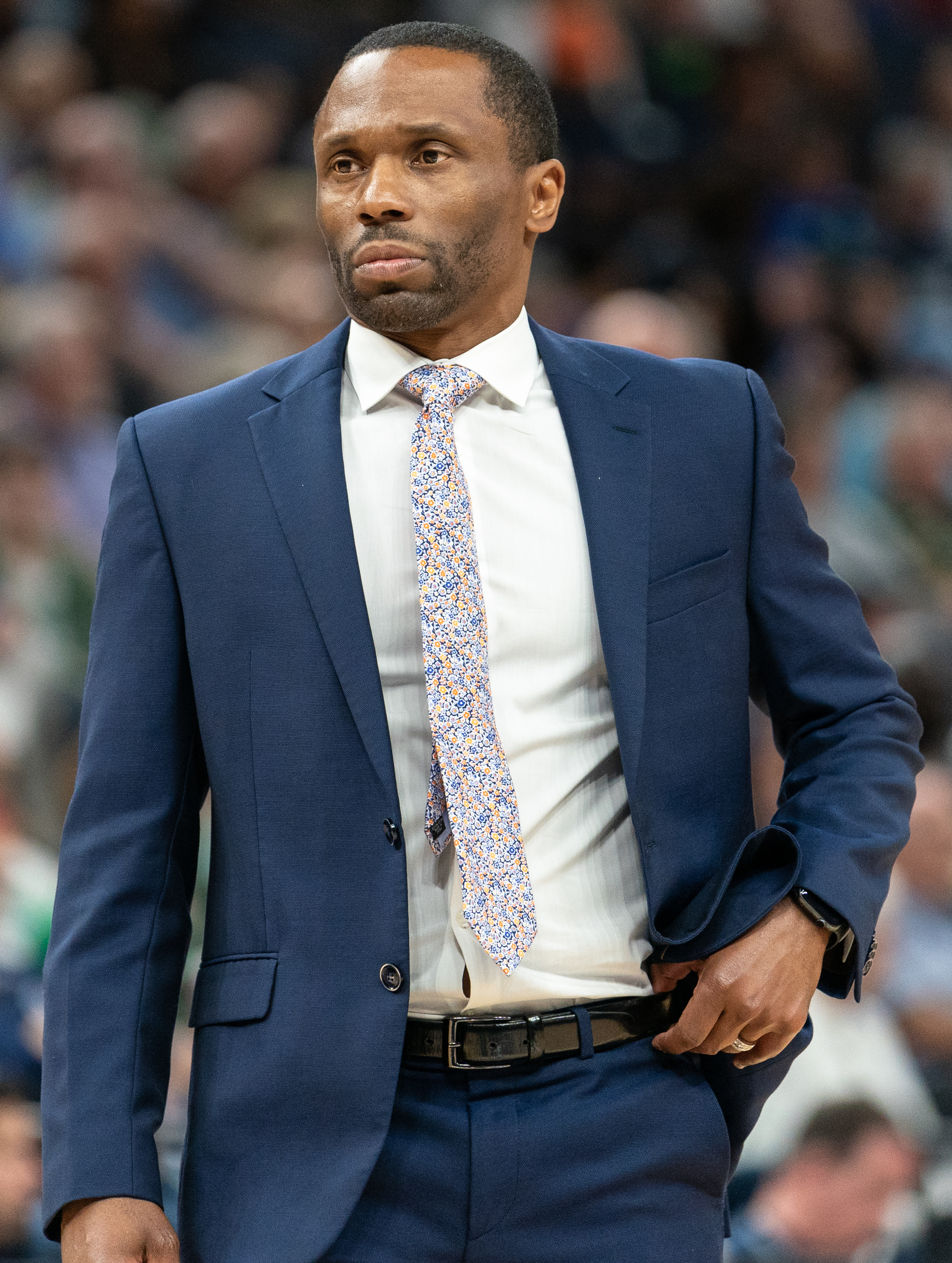
- Wade coaching in 2019

Free Agent
- Title: Assistant coach
- League: NBA

Personal information
- Born: August 15, 1975 (age 51) Memphis, Tennessee, U.S.
- Listed height: 5 ft 10 in (1.78 m)

Career information
- High school: Northside (Memphis, Tennessee)
- College: Middle Tennessee (1994–1995); Chattanooga State CC (1995–1996); Kennesaw State (1996–1998)
- NBA draft: 1998: undrafted
- Position: Guard
- Coaching career: 2013–present

Career history

Playing
- 2001–2004: Cambrai
- 2004–2005: CSK VVS Samara
- 2005: Rosalia de Castro Noyastar
- 2005–2006: CSK VVS-2 Samara
- 2006: Alicante Costablanca
- 2007–2008: Ústí nad Labem
- 2008: Nivelles
- 2008–2009: Union Carquefou-St. Luce
- 2009–2010: Aurore de Vitré
- 2010–2011: GET Vosges
- 2011–2013: Castelnau Le Lez Montpellier

Coaching
- 2012–2016: San Antonio Stars (assistant)
- 2013–2016: BLMA (assistant)
- 2017–2018: Minnesota Lynx (assistant)
- 2017–2020: UMMC Ekaterinburg (assistant)
- 2019–2023: Chicago Sky
- 2023–2026: Toronto Raptors (assistant)

Career highlights
- As head coach: WNBA champion (2021); WNBA Coach of the Year (2019); As assistant coach: WNBA champion (2017); 2× EuroLeague champion (2018, 2019); 2× Europe SuperCup winner (2018, 2019); 3× Russian National League champion (2018, 2019, 2020); NBA All-Star Game (2026); As executive: WNBA Basketball Executive of the Year (2022)

James Earl Wade Jr. (born August 15, 1975), known as Coco, is an American-French basketball assistant coach for the Toronto Raptors of the National Basketball Association (NBA).

With the Chicago Sky, Wade won the WNBA's Coach of the Year and Executive of the Year awards in 2019 and 2022 respectively, and led the Sky to their first WNBA Championship in 2021.

Wade was previously an assistant basketball coach for the Minnesota Lynx of the WNBA and for UMMC Ekaterinburg of the Euroleague and Russian Premier Basketball League. He is a former professional basketball player, having played his entire professional career in Europe.

== Playing career ==
From 2001 to 2004 Wade played in Cambrai, France. In 2004, he made a brief stop at CSK VVS Samara in the Russian Basketball Super League before taking his next contract at Rosalia Noyastar in Santiago de Compostela in the Spanish Adecco Oro. Directly after his contract in Spain, he revisited Russia. He would sign a contract with CSKA VVS Samara in Superleague B. In March 2006 Wade finished the season with Costa Urbana Playas in Spain. In the fall of 2007, Wade went on to play with Usti Nad Labem in the National Basketball League (Czech Republic). In the spring of 2008, he went on to play at Nivelles in the Pro B division of Belgium. For the 2008–2009 season, Wade took his game back to France and signed with Union Carquefou-Sainte Luce Basket. For the 2009–2010 season, he played for L'Aurore Vitre in France NM2. Wade played for GET Vosges in Epinal, France in France's NM1 division for the 2010–2011 season. He played the 2011–2013 for Castelnau Le Lez Basket in Montpellier, France. He concluded his basketball career playing against U.S. Colomiers in Toulouse, France in the French Cup scoring 33 points, 10 assists, and 6 rebounds in an 89–95 victory to conclude a 13-year career in Europe.

== Coaching career ==
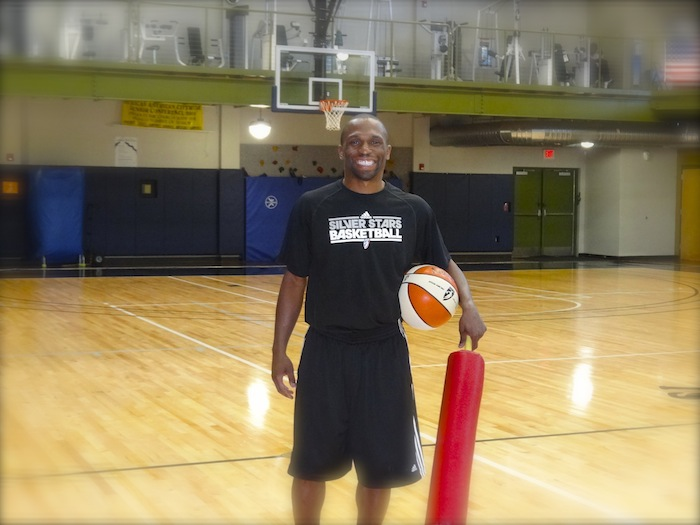
Wade with the San Antonio Stars

In the spring of 2012, Wade accepted a job as a basketball coaching intern with the WNBA's San Antonio Silver Stars. He served mainly as a player development coach, working closely with All-Stars Sophia Young and Danielle Adams. In 2013, he was hired on the full-time staff to serve as an assistant coach.

In April 2013, Wade served as an advance scout for UMMC Ekaterinburg during the Euroleague Final Eight that would see them go on to be crowned Champion of Europe. After the 2013 WNBA season, he took on a role to serve as an assistant coach for BLMA (Basket Lattes Montpellier Agglomeration).

On March 2, 2017, Wade was announced as the new assistant coach for the WNBA's Minnesota Lynx. One month later he would also be named assistant coach of Russian basketball powerhouse UMMC Ekaterinburg. On October 4, 2017, the Minnesota Lynx won a grueling 5-game series and were crowned WNBA champions for the 4th time in 7 years. This was Wade's first WNBA title. Sylvia Fowles was crowned MVP of the Finals following her regular-season WNBA MVP award. Wade had worked closely with Fowles during the 2017 season. On April 22, 2018, UMMC were crowned Euroleague Champions, and that title was followed quickly by a Russian League Championship on May 2, 2018. That made 3 titles in less than 7 months for Wade.

In November 2018, Wade was named head coach and general manager of the Chicago Sky of the WNBA. In his first season with the Sky, he led the team to its first playoff appearance in three years and was named WNBA Coach of the Year. The Sky lost in the second round of the playoffs to the Las Vegas Aces. In the 2020 season, the Sky posted a 12–10 record and returned to the playoffs but lost in the first round.

In the 2021 season, the Sky would win the WNBA Finals, defeating the Phoenix Mercury three games to one, giving Wade his first title as a coach. In the 2022 season, the Sky finished the regular season in second place with a 26–10, but lost in the semifinals to the Connecticut Sun. In the midst of the season, Wade received a contract extension through 2025.

On July 1, 2023, Wade stepped down of his positions as head coach and general manager of the Chicago Sky to take an assistant coach position with the Toronto Raptors. At the time, the Sky held a 7–9 record. Wade's departure in the middle of the season after initiating major roster changes the prior offseason received criticism.

== Head coaching record ==
=== WNBA ===
Legend
Regular season	G	Games coached	W	Games won	L	Games lost	W–L %	Win–loss %
Playoffs	PG	Playoff games	PW	Playoff wins	PL	Playoff losses	PW–L %	Playoff win–loss %

Team	Year	G	W	L	W–L%	Finish	PG	PW	PL	PW–L%	Result
CHI	2019	34	20	14	.588	3rd in East	2	1	1	.500	Lost in 2nd Round
CHI	2020	22	12	10	.545	1st in East	1	0	1	.000	Lost in 1st Round
CHI	2021	32	16	16	.500	2nd in East	10	8	2	.800	Won WNBA Finals
CHI	2022	36	26	10	.722	1st in East	8	4	4	.500	Lost in Semifinals
CHI	2023	16	7	9	.438	(resigned)	—	—	—	—	
Career		140	81	59	.579		21	13	8	.619	

== Personal life ==
Wade attended Northside High School in the Klondike neighborhood of Memphis, Tennessee. Wade has both French and American citizenship, and is also trilingual (English, French, and Spanish). He is married to Edwige Lawson-Wade, an Olympic silver medalist and professional basketball player. They have a son, James "Jet" Wade III. He is a member of Kappa Alpha Psi fraternity.
