= Mike Hegman =

American football player (born 1953)

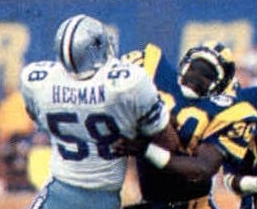
- Hegman (58) with the Dallas Cowboys in 1986

No. 58
- Position: Linebacker

Personal information
- Born: January 17, 1953 (age 73); Memphis, Tennessee, U.S.
- Listed height: 6 ft 1 in (1.85 m)
- Listed weight: 227 lb (103 kg)

Career information
- High school: Northside (Memphis)
- College: Tennessee State
- NFL draft: 1975: 7th round, 173rd overall pick

Career history
- Dallas Cowboys (1976−1988)

Awards and highlights
- Super Bowl champion (XII)

Career NFL statistics
- Sacks: 21
- Fumble recoveries: 9
- Defensive touchdowns: 2
- Stats at Pro Football Reference

Michael William Hegman (born January 17, 1953) is an American former professional football player who was a linebacker in the National Football League (NFL) for the Dallas Cowboys. He played college football for the Tennessee State Tigers.

== Early life ==
Hegman did not start playing football until his senior year at Northside High School in the Klondike neighborhood of Memphis, Tennessee. He began his college career at Alabama A&M University and then transferred to Tennessee State University, where he walked on to the Tennessee State Tigers football team. He was a teammate of Ed "Too Tall" Jones, and the starting middle linebacker on the school's 10–0 team, that won the black college football national championship in 1973. The next year, he finished with a school record 158 tackles.

At the end of his junior season, it was incorrectly believed that Hegman still had a year of eligibility. The Dallas Cowboys were thought to be one of the only NFL teams that knew he was eligible for the draft, and drafted him in what came to be known as the Dirty Dozen Draft in 1975. Two games into the 1975 college football season, the NCAA declared him ineligible and forced him to sit our the rest of the games. Although he sat out most of the year, he was allowed to play in the Senior Bowl.

== Professional career ==
The Dallas Cowboys selected him as a junior in the seventh round (173rd overall) of the 1975 NFL draft. The team was allowed to retain his rights, after they were proven right that he was technically eligible, because his class had graduated that year.

After his unusual entrance into the NFL in 1976, he spent most of his first four seasons playing special teams and as an outside linebacker backup to Thomas "Hollywood" Henderson and D. D. Lewis. During Super Bowl XIII against the Pittsburgh Steelers, he made his most famous play, taking the ball from Terry Bradshaw and scoring on a 37-yard fumble return for a touchdown.

Hegman became the starting strong-side linebacker after the team waived Henderson 11 games into the 1979 season. In 1985, he lost five games with a broken arm. In 1987, he missed 6 games with a broken leg.

In 1988, he suffered cartilage tear in his right knee during the preseason and was placed on the injured reserve list. He was released as part of a youth movement on October 25.

Hegman played 12 years and started in 116 games, becoming a dependable player in the Cowboys defense for more than a decade. He helped the Cowboys win two NFC Championships and one Super Bowl during his career.

== Personal life ==
During the 1980 offseason, he faced prosecution on a charge of forging a friend's name on $10,534 worth of checks. The case was dismissed after he paid the money he owed, with the help of players like Cliff Harris, Roger Staubach, Bob Breunig and Tony Dorsett, who gave $2,000 each to help cover the debt.
