= Hunter Bradley (American football) =

American football player (born 1994)

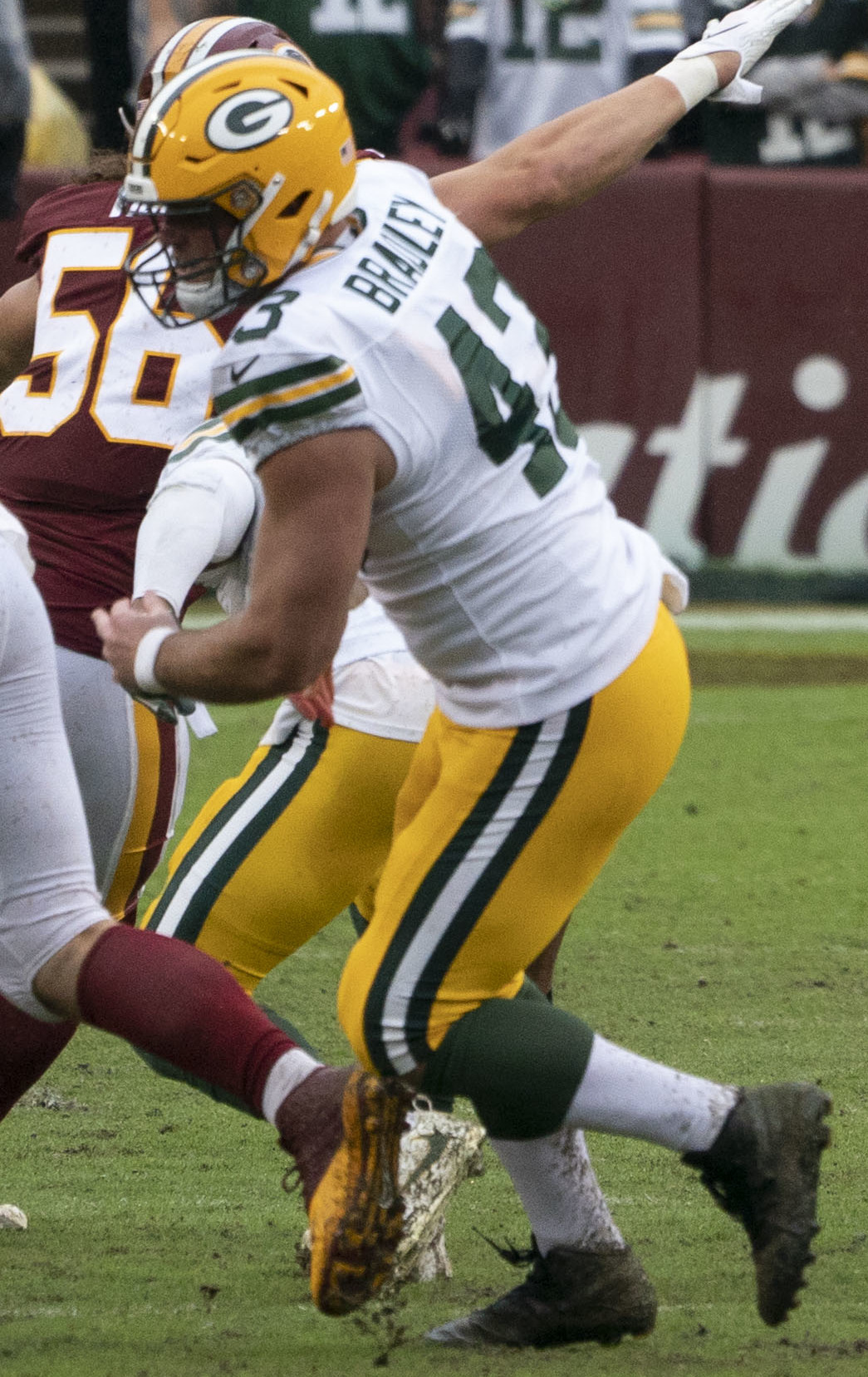
- Bradley with the Green Bay Packers in 2018

No. 43, 48
- Position: Long snapper

Personal information
- Born: May 21, 1994 (age 32); Collierville, Tennessee, U.S.
- Listed height: 6 ft 3 in (1.91 m)
- Listed weight: 241 lb (109 kg)

Career information
- High school: Collierville
- College: Mississippi State (2012–2017)
- NFL draft: 2018: 7th round, 239th overall pick

Career history
- Green Bay Packers (2018–2021); Arizona Cardinals (2022)*
- * Offseason or practice squad member only

Career NFL statistics
- Games played: 58
- Total tackles: 3
- Stats at Pro Football Reference

Hunter Austin Bradley (born May 21, 1994) is an American former professional football player who was a long snapper in the National Football League (NFL). He played college football for the Mississippi State Bulldogs. He was selected by the Green Bay Packers in the seventh round of the 2018 NFL draft.

== College career ==
Bradley began his MSU career in 2012 as a tight end but multiple knee surgeries forced him into a long snapping role, which he took over as a starter in 2015. The 6-foot-3, 240-pounder from Collierville, Tennessee was perfect through 41 career games and also collected four tackles.

== Professional career ==
=== Green Bay Packers ===
Bradley was selected by the Green Bay Packers with the 239th overall pick in the seventh round of the 2018 NFL draft. This made Bradley only the ninth long snapper ever drafted in the NFL draft. The Packers originally acquired the pick used to select Bradley by trading Lerentee McCray to the Buffalo Bills. On May 4, 2018, he signed a contract with the Packers.

Bradley was placed on the reserve/COVID-19 list by the Packers on August 3, 2020. He was activated on August 19.

Bradley was released by the Packers on November 2, 2021.

=== Arizona Cardinals ===
On December 28, 2022, Bradley signed with the practice squad of the Arizona Cardinals.
