= Collierville Schools =

School district in Tennessee, United States

Address
- 145 W Poplar Ave Collierville, Tennessee, 38017; United States

District information
- Type: Public
- Grades: Pre-K–12th
- Established: 2014
- NCES District ID: 4700149

Students and staff
- Students: 9,367

Other information
- Website: www.colliervilleschools.org

Collierville Schools is a municipal school district that serves approximately 9,000 students in Collierville, Tennessee. It was formed by secession from Shelby County Schools in 2014.

== History ==
Collierville Schools was formed in 2014 as one of six suburban school districts to secede from Shelby County Schools after the Tennessee legislature permitted the formation of new school districts the previous year.

The district saw considerable reshuffling due to overcrowding at the start of the 2018–19 school year. The high school received a new amenity-laden $94 million campus, and Schilling Farms Middle School moved into the old high school building as "West Collierville Middle School". The Schilling Farms namesake and old campus were thereafter used for a new elementary school. The following year, the district shifted its middle and high school start times to a later schedule. The shift was prompted by a petition authored by high school student Chase Via that advocated for later school start times.

Upon the creation of the district, former superintendent John Aikten of Shelby County Schools was selected as superintendent. After Aitken retired in 2019, he was succeeded by Dr. Gary Lilly, former superintendent of Bristol Tennessee City Schools.

== Schools ==
=== High schools ===
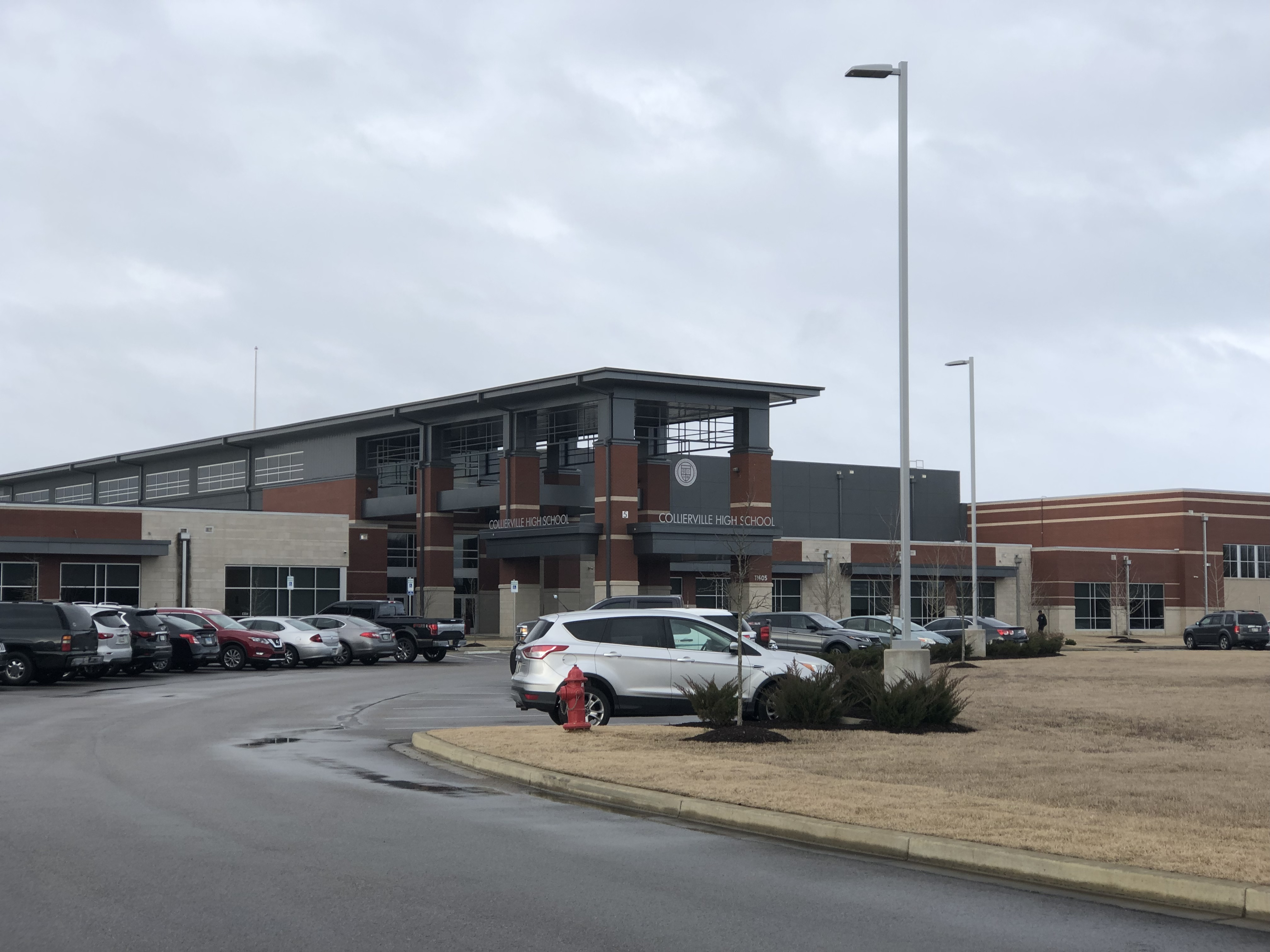
Collierville High School, the district high school

- Collierville High School

=== Middle schools ===
- Collierville Middle School
- West Collierville Middle School

=== Elementary schools ===
- Bailey Station Elementary School
- Collierville Elementary School
- Crosswind Elementary School
- Sycamore Elementary School
- Tara Oaks Elementary School
- Schilling Farms Elementary School
