= Germantown Municipal School District =

School district in Tennessee, United States

Address
- 3350 S Forest Hill Irene Rd Germantown, Tennessee, 38138; United States

District information
- Grades: K–12th
- Schools: 7 (2023–24)
- NCES District ID: 4700151

Students and staff
- Students: 6,028 (2023–24)

The Germantown Municipal School District (GMSD) is a municipal school district serving Germantown, Tennessee, United States. The school district was formed in 2013.

The schools included in the district are Dogwood Elementary School, Forest Hill Elementary School, Farmington Elementary School, Germantown Elementary School, Houston Middle School, Germantown Middle School, Riverdale K–8 and Houston High School. Germantown Elementary School and Germantown Middle School effectively became part of this school district in August 2025 while Germantown High School will also become part of the district several years from now. The property where Germantown High School currently sits will be sold to help fund construction of a new High School in Cordova, TN, to replace Germantown High School.

With an enrollment of over 5,900 students by 2017, the district has seen huge increases in enrollment since opening its doors in 2014. In the spring of 2016, Germantown Municipal Schools broke ground on an addition to Riverdale K-8 School. The 64,000 square foot add-on will house the school's middle school population. Due to the enrollment numbers in the elementary school grade bands continues to grow, the school district is decided to build a new elementary school, and the school opened in the spring of 2018. The high school also saw two additions in its first year: a television studio and a new turf field.

The school board hired Jason Manuel as the district's first superintendent. The district was named one of twelve "Exemplary Districts" in Tennessee. In 2015, two of its schools performed in the top 15% for performance on standardized tests, and the district as a whole earned the highest ACT average for the entire State of Tennessee in its first and second years (consecutively).
