= Memphis-Shelby County Schools =

American public school district

Address
- 160 S. Hollywood Street Memphis, Tennessee, 38112; United States

District information
- Grades: Pre-K–12th
- Superintendent: Dr. Roderick Richmond
- School board: Shelby County Board of Education
- Chair of the board: Joyce Dorse Coleman
- Schools: 222 (2022-23)
- NCES District ID: 4700148

Students and staff
- Students: 109,797 (2022-23)
- Teachers: 6,885 (2022-23)
- Staff: 5,067 (2022-23)
- Student–teacher ratio: 15.95:1 (2022-23)

Other information
- Website: scsk12.org

Memphis-Shelby County Schools (MSCS), previously known as Shelby County Schools (SCS), is a public school district that serves the city of Memphis, Tennessee, United States, as well as most of the unincorporated areas of Shelby County. MSCS is the 23rd largest school district in the United States and the largest in Tennessee.

Due to the city of Memphis dissolving its school charter in 2011, causing the end of Memphis City Schools, as of July 1, 2013, all Shelby County residents were served by SCS, including those in Memphis. Following passage of a state law lifting the ban on establishment of new school districts, the six incorporated suburbs in the county each voted in July 2013 to establish six independent municipal school districts. As a result, as of the start of the 2014 school year, the six incorporated cities in Shelby County (other than Memphis) are each served by separate school districts.

As of August 2014 there are six municipal school districts known as Collierville Schools, Germantown Municipal School District, Bartlett City Schools, Arlington Community Schools, Lakeland School System, and Millington Municipal Schools

== History ==
The Shelby County School District was developed in the late 19th century, after public schools were established in the county. Until July 1, 2013, it served residents of Shelby County except for the city of Memphis (which established its own public school system in 1867).

Over decades of development and change, the city of Memphis and Shelby County differed in their ability to support their school systems. By the 1990s, the state ranked as 45th in funding of public schools. The legislature passed the Education Improvement Act in 1992 to improve funding of schools as well as election of board members and school management. Until 1996, Shelby County school board members had been appointed by the Shelby County Commission.

This arrangement was changed due to Tennessee's interpretation of its constitutional requirement that county officials, including school boards, be elected by all residents of the county, as well as elements of the state's Education Improvement Act of 1992, which addressed election of school boards. The Shelby County Commission established seven single-member districts to elect representatives to the school board; the districts represented the entire population of the county, although the city of Memphis at the time had its own school system and its residents were not served by the county system. The population of Memphis comprised more than 75% of the county's population in 1990, and would have dominated the school board with six of seven positions. (As of 2020, Memphis has 68% of the county's population.)

Plaintiffs from the county, including the mayors of the six municipalities, objected under the Equal Protection Clause to having their system dominated by county residents who would not be served by the system. The US District Court, in a 1997 decision affirmed by the Appeals Court, ruled that the Constitution did not require all county residents to be included in a district that served only part of the county. As a result, the special election districts were redrawn to represent the area of Shelby County outside the city of Memphis, as this was the area served by the county school district.

=== Merger with Memphis City Schools ===
On March 8, 2011, Memphis city residents voted to dissolve their school charter and disband Memphis City Schools, effectively merging the city with the Shelby County School District. The city had the authority to do this under state law. The merger was to be implemented effective at the start of the 2013–14 school year.

Total enrollment in the county school system, as of the 2010–2011 school year, was about 47,000 students, making the district the fourth largest in Tennessee. With the Memphis/Shelby County merger completed, the district received an addition of more than 100,000 students, making it the largest system in the state and one of the larger systems in the country.

In 2011, Sam Dillon of The New York Times said that although there was existing inequality between Shelby County Schools and Memphis City Schools, "nobody expects the demographics of schools to change much" as a result of the merger between the districts. He said that "most students in both districts are assigned to neighborhood schools and housing tends to be segregated." Some white families expressed concern that the merger would provoke white flight from Shelby County, which has lost white population in the last decade.

Following the merger, the state legislature passed a law that lifted the statewide ban on forming new school districts; this was effectively for Shelby County only, as it limited new special school districts to only counties with populations over 900,000. Shelby County is the only one to meet that criterion. The six incorporated municipalities had elections in which voters chose to establish their own independent school districts. These elections were overturned in 2012 as the state law was held to be unconstitutional by the state court, as being written for a particular group of people and not the whole state. In 2013, the Tennessee General Assembly lifted the ban statewide. In July 2013, the six incorporated suburbs in Shelby County overwhelmingly voted again in favor of their own municipal schools and withdrew from the county system.

=== Reimagining 901 ===
On April 16, 2021, then-superintendent Dr. Joris M. Ray (resigned because of a private divorce became public) revealed the Reimagining 901 plan in his State of the District address. One part of the plan was a name change from Shelby County School District to "Memphis-Shelby County Schools" and the accompanying logo change. The rebranding was made official after a board meeting on January 25, 2022, when the doing business as was changed to Memphis-Shelby County Schools. The plan included building 5 new schools, closing 15 schools, and adding on to 13 schools; thus this plan was to be completed in 2031.

== Governance and administration ==
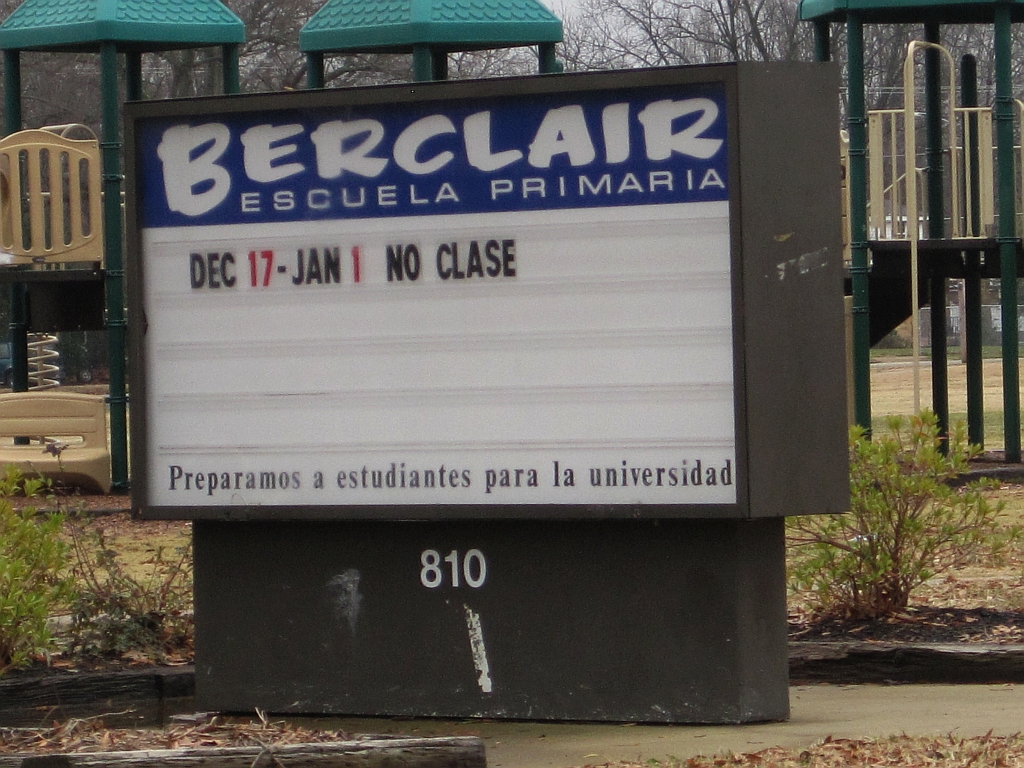
Spanish sign of Berclair Elementary School

The county district is governed by a nine-member board of education. Board members represent nine special election districts in the Shelby County school district, which includes the city of Memphis but not the six suburban municipalities. These members are elected to four-year terms.

The current Interim superintendent is Dr. Roderick Richmond.

== Accreditation ==
All of the "legacy" SCS schools in the school district are accredited. These particular schools meet the standards of the Tennessee Department of Education and the accreditation standards of the Southern Association of Colleges and Schools (SACS). The legacy Shelby County School District was the first large district in Tennessee to be accredited in its entirety by SACS.

== Schools ==
MSCS contains 214 schools in Shelby County. Of these schools, 158 are directly operated by MSCS, while the other 56 are charter schools.

== Optional program ==
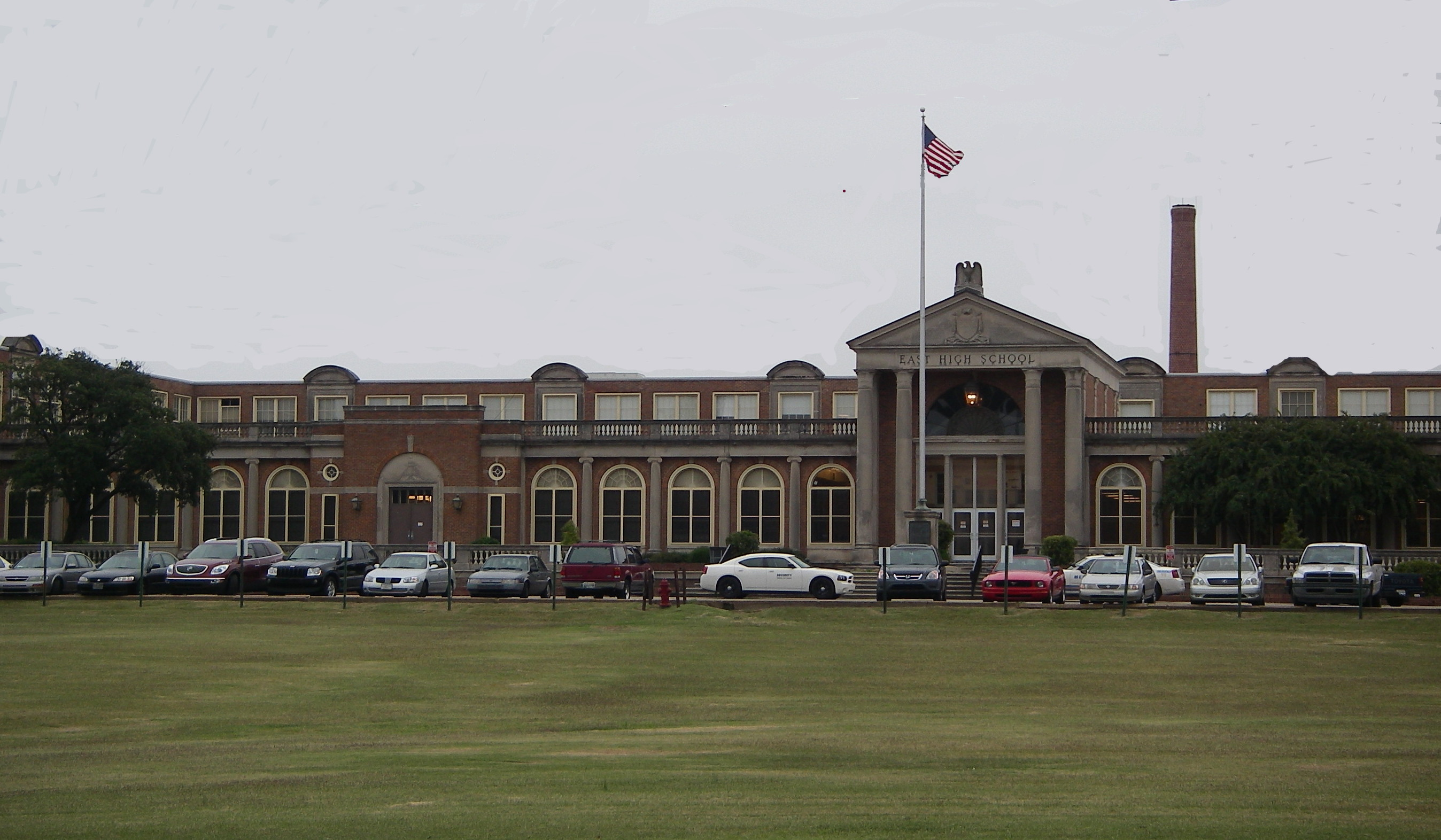
East High School, a transportation-themed Optional School

The Optional Schools program is a set of 45 theme-based magnet schools. Entrance requirements vary between each Optional school, but are generally based on conduct, attendance, report cards, and standardized test scores.

== Other facilities ==
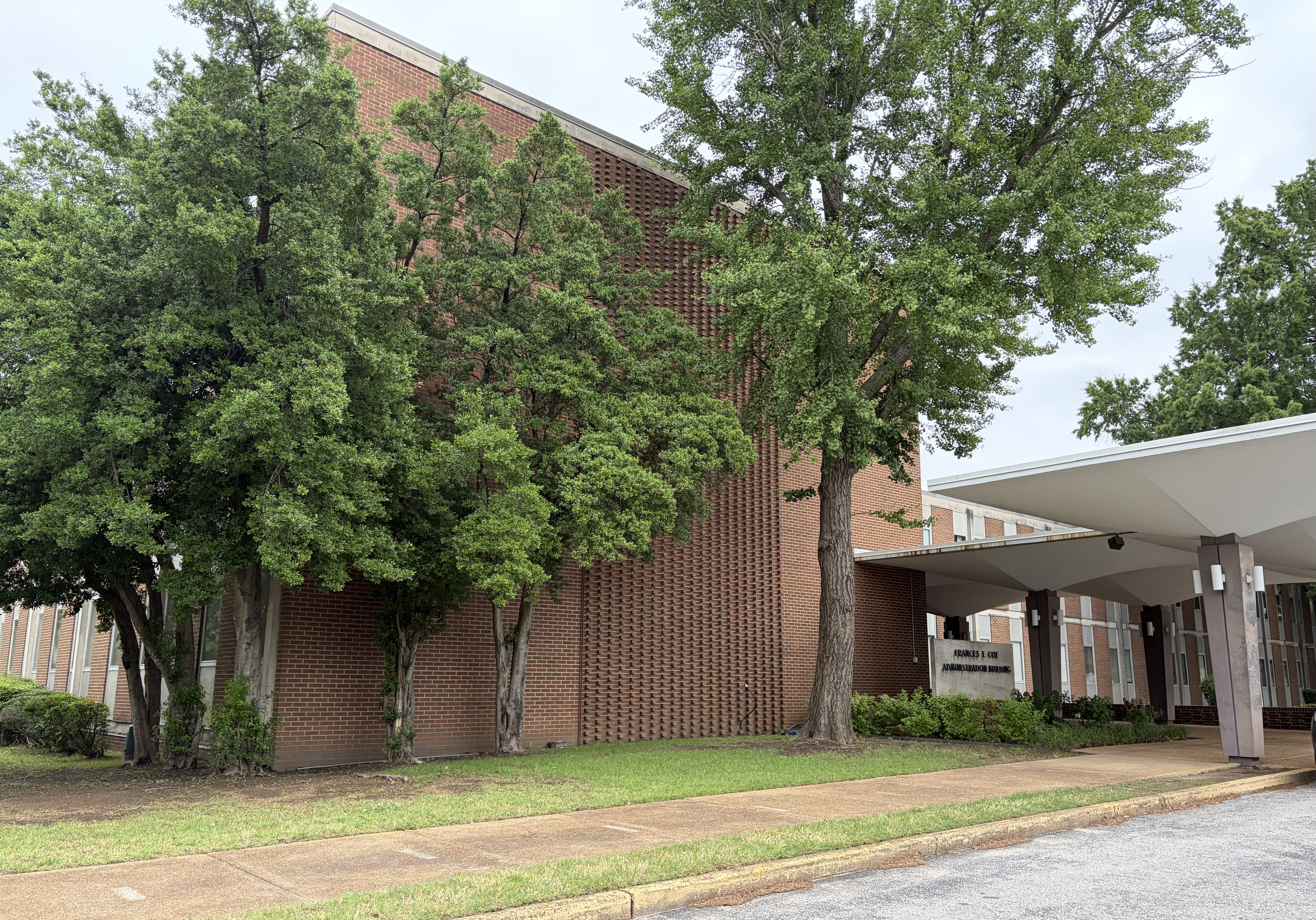
Headquarters of Memphis–Shelby County Schools in the Francis E. Coe Administration Building

Shelby County Schools is headquartered in Memphis at the Francis E. Coe Administration Building. The headquarters facility was shared between the pre-merger Shelby County Schools and Memphis City Schools. The building has two wings, and one had been used by each pre-merger district. As of 2013 the corridor linking the wings had double-locked doors, and the glass panels had been covered by particle boards. Irving Hamer, the deputy superintendent of Memphis City Schools, described the barrier as "our Berlin Wall."

In 2018, SCS acquired a former Bayer office building in North Memphis for $6.6 million with the intention of consolidating the existing headquarters and ten other support buildings there. However, in 2024 Superintendent Marie Feagins told the Board of Education that the campus would need $70 million in renovations. The board approved the sale of the building for $5 million in 2025 due to rising maintenance costs.

== See also ==
- List of school districts in Tennessee
- List of high schools in Tennessee
