= List of stuffed toy manufacturers =

This is a list of notable companies that manufacture stuffed toys.

== Canada ==
- Ganz
- Mastermind Toys
- WowWee
- Youtooz

== Germany ==
- Margarete Steiff GmbH
- NICI AG
- Sigikid
- Teddy-Hermann

== Japan ==
- Nakajima USA
- Sanrio
- San-X
- Sekiguchi Corporation

== United Kingdom ==
- Chad Valley
- Jellycat
- J. K. Farnell (defunct)
- Merrythought
- Teddy Atelier Stursberg

== United States ==
- Applause Inc. (defunct)
- Boyds Bears
- Build-A-Bear Workshop
- Bunnies By The Bay
- Cabbage Patch Kids
- Funko
- GIANTmicrobes
- Gund
- Hallmark (Itty Bittys, Happy Go Luckys)
- Ideal Toy Company (defunct)
- Jazwares (Squishmallows)
- Mary Meyer Corporation
- Ty
- Vermont Teddy Bear Company

== See also ==
- List of toys
