= Jeremy Padawer =

American Toy Industry Executive

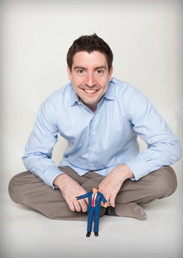
- Born: October 26, 1973 (age 52); Germantown, Tennessee, US
- Education: Germantown High School
- Alma mater: University of Texas at Austin (BA); University of Tennessee (JD); Vanderbilt University (MBA)
- Occupations: Businessman, television producer
- Years active: 1996–
- Website: www.jeremy.com

Jeremy Padawer (born October 26, 1973) is an American businessman, founder, animated television producer, collector, venture capitalist, and broadly recognized toy industry executive and entrepreneur. Padawer is President of Jazwares, a Berkshire Hathaway company. Prior to selling to Berkshire Hathaway (2022), Padawer's toy company Wicked Cool Toys was acquired by Jazwares and parent company Alleghany Corporation in 2019.

Padawer co-created and executive produced the Nickelodeon animated series Monsuno which ran for 65 episodes from 2012 to 2015.

== Early career ==
In 1996, Padawer developed a network of transactional toy and gaming websites. Padawer "gamed" the Yahoo search engine using simple naming strategies. By naming each one of his collectible websites starting with two A's, Padawer's sites would come up first in search. Advertisers included Disney, Onsale.com, and Amazon.com. Most notably, Newsweek followed Padawer's tracking of the plunge in Beanie Baby valuations in 1998–1999 on Padawer's AbsoluteBeanies.com.

Padawer is an early domain name investor. Padawer's sale of www.act.com to Symantec stands as one of the largest domain name transactions in history. Padawer purchased hundreds of generic .com domain names from 1996 to 2000 including his own first name (Jeremy.com), his city (PacificPalisades.com). Padawer utilized direct navigation traffic, aggregating hits for advertising dollars.

In addition, Padawer developed DomainAppraiser.com, a site that advised thousands of domain name holders on valuation (1999–2001), and Schmuck.com, an online monthly with material by amateur humorists and users (1998–2000).

== Toy business ==
=== Mattel (2001–2003) ===
In 2001, Mattel recruited Padawer out of Vanderbilt University's MBA program. Padawer managed Hot Wheels, Nickelodeon brands, and a relaunch of Masters of the Universe.

=== Jakks Pacific (2003–2013) ===
In 2003, Padawer moved to Jakks Pacific, where he headed up boys' entertainment brands (2003–2009) before becoming EVP / GM of Jakks Malibu, the largest business unit at Jakks Pacific (2010–2013). Padawer reinvented the WWE toy line and over the next 10 years launched 30+ brands into the mass marketplace, including Pokémon, Dragon Ball Z, Club Penguin, UFC, Neopets, SpongeBob SquarePants, Disney Princess, Winx Club, Nintendo, Disney Fairies, the Rocky franchise, Phineas and Ferb, and more.

Padawer was responsible for brand, marketing, product development, business development, and entertainment content development across all JAKKS Malibu business unit categories.

=== Wicked Cool Toys / Jazwares (2013–present) ===
In 2013, Padawer entered into a partnership in start-up Wicked Cool Toys as Co-CEO / President and Partner.

- The early years of Wicked Cool Toys focused on A-Level licenses with B-Level categories offering retail incremental margin on top brands like Teenage Mutant Ninja Turtles, WWE, as well as a master toy license for The Wiggles.
- In the following years, WCT signed global deals with Wild Kratts (2014), Cabbage Patch Kids as master toy partner (2015), Girl Scouts Activity Oven (2015), and relaunched Teddy Ruxpin (2016).
- In May 2017, the Pokémon Company International announced it had become a strategic investor in Wicked Cool Toys and granted Wicked Cool Toys the global Pokémon toy license outside of Asia.
- In 2018–2019, WCT signed global licensing partnerships with Microsoft's HALO, All Elite Wrestling, Hasbro's Micro Machines and Cocomelon.

In October 2019, Jazwares, a subsidiary of Alleghany Capital Corporation (Y - NYSE), acquired Wicked Cool Toys.

In April 2020, Jazwares, with Padawer as equity partner, acquired KellyToy which includes the global phenomenon Squishmallows.

- The combined company, Jazwares, develops, manufactures, and markets toys and collectibles globally for Squishmallows, Hello Kitty, Pokémon, Fortnite, Roblox, Cocomelon, AEW, HALO, Spiderman and Friends, Five Nights at Freddy's, Spiral Cute brands including Chiicawa, Mofusand and Koupen Chan, as well as Star Wars and Marvel Halloween costumes and dress up, and much more.

In October 2022, Jazwares / Alleghany Capital was acquired by Berkshire Hathaway.

Padawer remained on as Chief Brand Officer, and then President, at Jazwares, a top 5 toy company.

== Entertainment development ==
Padawer is the co-creator and executive producer of the American-Japanese animated series Monsuno. The show premiered in the United States on February 23, 2012, on Nickelodeon's sister channel, Nicktoons, and on TV Tokyo in Japan in October 2012.

Padawer assembled a global strategic partnership between Jakks Pacific, Nickelodeon, Topps, Michael Eisner, and Fremantle Media.

Monsuno ran for 65 episodes (2012–2015) and is currently supported in syndication around the world.

As President of Jazwares, Padawer oversees the company's content and entertainment development, including the upcoming Squishmallows feature film from Amazon MGM Studios, produced by Beau Flynn.

== Venture capital ==
Padawer is an early-stage venture investor, with investments in more than 25 companies in the seed and Series A stages, and has served as an advisor to several early-stage companies, including - WhatNot, Real American Freestyle, Nostalgix Private Brokerage, Treasure Trove, FLOAT Insurance, Audio Media Grading (AMG), Collector Archive Services Grading (CAS), Collectible Ethernity Labs Grading (CEL), Rare Candy, Negosh, BoxUnion, Zigazoo, ArtPics, Good Springs Capital, Moxxie Ventures. Most notably, Padawer participated in Whatnot's Series A financing at a valuation of approximately $90 million; the company was subsequently valued at approximately $20 billion in Series G funding round.

== Collecting ==
Padawer is a collector of vintage toys, trading cards, trading card games, manga, scripts, storyboards, movie props, narrative art and other pop-culture memorabilia. He has publicly discussed collecting as both a personal interest and an alternative asset class, with particular emphasis on scarcity, condition and cultural significance.

Pokémon - Padawer became known for collecting high-value Pokémon cards and memorabilia. His collection included rare first-edition cards in PSA 10 and other early Pokémon memorabilia. Much of the collection was destroyed when his Pacific Palisades home burned in the January 2025 Palisades Fire. In 2026, Padawer estimated that his lost Pokémon collection had been worth approximately $8 million.

Logan Paul - Padawer has also been associated with the collector and media personality Logan Paul. In 2020, he helped connect Paul with the owner of the only PSA 10-graded Pikachu Illustrator card. Guinness World Records reported that Paul traveled to Dubai "thanks to a connection made by collectibles expert Jeremy Padawer." The card was subsequently sold through Goldin Auctions in February 2026 for $16.492 million, setting a record for the most expensive trading card sold at auction.

Manga - Following the Palisades Fire, Padawer expanded his collecting into high-grade manga and early Japanese publications. In March, 2026, he purchased high-grade first volumes of Dragon Ball, One Piece and Naruto for a combined $275,000 - the transaction included a BGS 9.4 Dragon Ball Volume 1 (highest grade), BGS 9.8 One Piece Volume 1 (highest grade), and BGS 9.8 Naruto Volume 1 (highest grade).

Padawer and Logan Paul later jointly acquired copies of Weekly Shōnen Jump containing the first serialized chapters of Dragon Ball and One Piece. The Dragon Ball issue, graded BGS 9.2, was purchased for a record $550,000, while the price of the One Piece issue was reported as being in the hundreds of thousands of dollars.

Padawer has also collected production materials associated with manga and anime, including scripts and artifacts connected with major Japanese franchises. Padawer has described manga as an emerging collectibles category, arguing that franchises including Dragon Ball, One Piece and Naruto have developed cultural significance comparable to long-established Western comic-book properties.

== Pacific Palisades Fire advocacy ==
After losing his home in the January 2025 Palisades Fire, Padawer became an advocate for residents affected by the disaster, focusing on government accountability, fire preparedness, and the rebuilding of Pacific Palisades. The New Yorker described Padawer as a "vocal critic" of authorities following the fire and reported on his advocacy for improved fire prevention, evacuation, planning, insurance reform and government accountability.

Padawer used his website PacificPalisades.com, a domain he had owned for more than two decades, as a community news and advocacy website, publishing more than 150 articles about the fire, recovery and rebuilding process.. In his writing and public appearances, Padawer has argued that the scale of the disaster resulted from a series of failures in prevention, infrastructure, emergency services and government leadership.

On the 1st anniversary of the fire, Padawer organized and personally funded the "They Let Us Burn" rally in Pacific Palisades, which called for accountability from city and state officials and agencies involved in fire prevention and response. The Los Angeles Times reported that hundreds of residents attended the protest, where Padawer criticized what he characterized as government "gaslighting" and called for greater accountability for the disaster and its aftermath. Padawer described the event as nonpartisan and focused on transparency, accountability and helping displaced residents rebuild.

== Philanthropy ==
In 2010, Padawer was inducted into the ToyFare Magazine hall of fame.

Padawer is on the Toy Industry Association Board of Directors (2023), where he serves on the Executive Committee.

Padawer is active at Vanderbilt University where he sits on Vanderbilt University's business school Alumni Board of Directors (2023), and established the annual Jeremy Padawer Scholarship for Entrepreneurial Students.
