= Squishmallows =

Brand of stuffed toys

Original Squishmallows
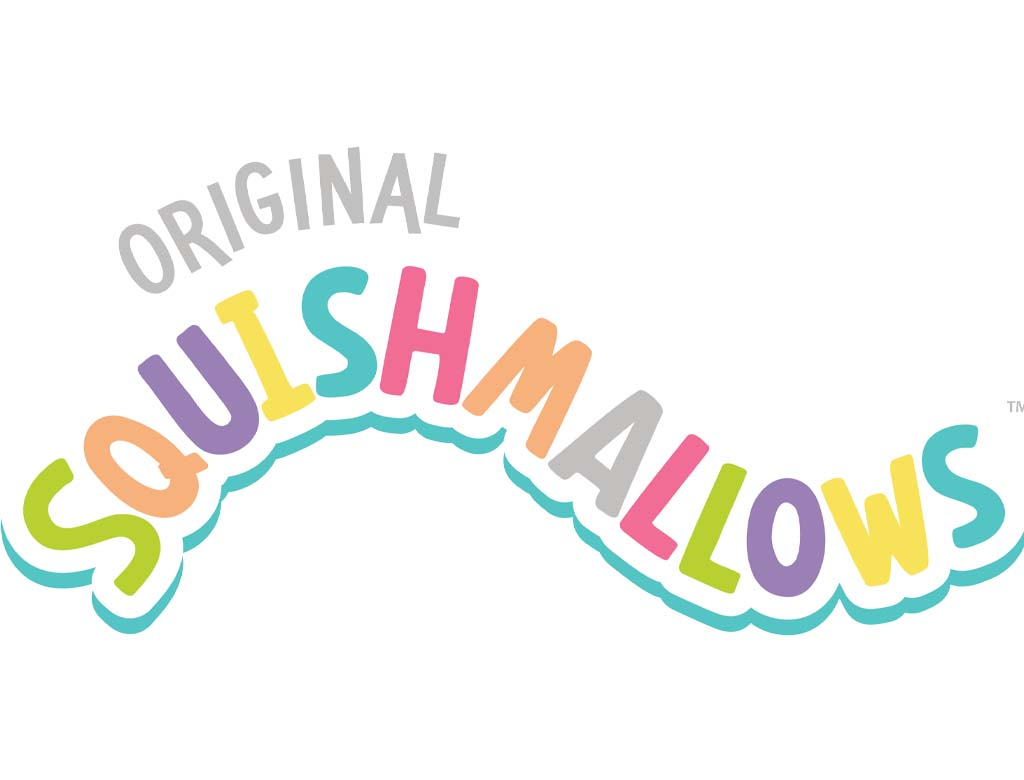

- A small collection of Squishmallows plushies
- Product type: Stuffed toy
- Current owner: Jazwares; Berkshire Hathaway
- Produced by: Kelly Toys Holdings LLC
- Country: United States
- Introduced: 2017; 9 years ago
- Markets: 60 countries
- Tagline: "Squad Up!"
- Website: shop.jazwares.com/pages/squishmallows/

Squishmallows is a brand of stuffed toy that was launched in 2017 by Kelly Toys Holdings LLC and is owned by Jazwares, a Berkshire Hathaway company. Squishmallows are round and come in a variety of colors, sizes, animals/foods/objects, and textures. The brand has created over 3,000 Squishmallow designs.

== History ==
=== Founder ===
Kelly Toys Holdings, headquartered in Los Angeles, California, was founded in 1986 by Jonathan Kelly. In an interview with Yahoo! Finance, Kelly stated that he came up with the idea for Squishmallows when he went to Japan and saw a variety of appealing toy products, including plush toys. Kelly and his team then spent several months creating a toy that emulated the “soft, cute, and kawaii” look of the Japanese plush toys.

Judd Zebersky, CEO and president of Jazwares, announced a strategic partnership with Kelly Toys in 2019 to "reinvigorate and expand distribution" of its Russ Berrie brand, which Jazwares had acquired in 2018. After collaborating for a year, Jazwares acquired Kelly Toys to expand its marketplace position and obtain additional marketplace licenses for the brand. Kelly Toys was acquired by Jazwares, a Berkshire Hathaway company, in 2020. The official partnership was announced in April 2020 by Zebersky along with Kelly Toys and their parent company, Alleghany Corporation. Kelly Toys Holdings was Jazwares' second acquisition following their acquisition of Wicked Cool Toys in 2019.

=== Popularity ===
Squishmallows first gained success during the COVID-19 pandemic in 2020-21 through social media outlets such as TikTok, where Squishmallows collectors would post about their collections. The TikTok hashtag #Squishmallows has gained over 550 million views. Squishmallows has acquired nearly 120,000 followers on Twitter as of 2023, 456,000 TikTok followers and nearly 890,000 followers on Instagram. As of May 2024, the brand has more than 13 billion views on TikTok and has been tagged more than 1 million times on Instagram.

As of August 2024, 400 million Squishmallows units, in 3,000 styles, have been sold.

=== Collaborations ===
Since the company’s partnership, Squishmallows has collaborated with many other brands, further expanding its position in the market. Some notable collaborations include Squishmallows x Hello Kitty, announced on Jazwares’ official website in April 2021, and Squishmallows x Pokémon, which debuted at the 2022 San Diego Comic-Con where guests could view the upcoming launch of Squishmallows characters. Other brands and franchises that Squishmallows have collaborated with include Disney, Star Wars, Marvel Comics, Harry Potter, The Wizard of Oz, SpongeBob SquarePants, The Muppets, Sonic the Hedgehog, Peanuts, Care Bears, Five Nights at Freddy's, The Lord of the Rings, Wicked, Stranger Things, Elf, The Grinch, Wednesday, K-Pop Demon Hunters, Peppa Pig, Ryan's World, Cocomelon, Paw Patrol and Bluey.

The company has also collaborated with Monopoly and created a Monopoly board game involving purchasing Squishmallows instead of properties. The game also includes a special version of Cam the Cat which is exclusive to this game.

In December 2023, McDonald’s announced Squishmallows x McDonald’s. This collaboration presented 12 Squishmallows toys as collectible Happy Meal toys, including a special-edition Grimace design.

In March 2024 is Squishmallows x PUMA, which released a select few Squishmallows characters as sneaker and apparel designs available to consumers at retail stores and on the PUMA website.

The most recent squishmallows collaborations as of September 2026 is with Disney/Pixar's Toy Story 5, featuring plush toys of characters Forky, Buzz Lightyear, and Zurg, as well as a Valentine's Day themed Sanrio set including Kuromi and My Melody.

Also, in 2026, Squishmallows x McDonalds returned to release a set of FIFA World Cup 2026 Squishmallow Happy Meal toys.

== Product ==
=== Materials ===
Squishmallows are made from soft spandex and filled with polyester fiber. As mentioned by Squishmallows on their Twitter account, they are manufactured in China. Squishmallows originally came in four sizes, but are now sold in 12 different sizes ranging from a clip-on 3.5 inches to a large 24 inches.

Authentic Squishmallows can be identified by their three attached tags. Squishmallows have also extended their line to include HugMees, Squish-Doos, Heroes, FlipAMallows, FuzzAMallows, Squish-a-longs, Squisharoys, Squooshems, Squishville, Mystery Squad, Micromallows, and Stackables.

Demonstration of reversible Squishmallows known as Flip-A-Mallows

==== Retailers ====
Squishmallows were originally sold directly through the KellyToys website and later became available in retail locations through partnerships with stores such as Walgreens. Squishmallows can now be found in many stores, including Claire's, Party City, Real Canadian Superstore, Shoppers Drug Mart, Save-On-Foods, PriceSmart Foods, Urban Fare, Costco, Target, Walgreens, CVS, Kroger, Hot Topic, London Drugs, Mastermind Toys, Five Below, EB Games, GameStop, Walmart and Hamrick's and online retailers such as Amazon, and the official website. Squishmallows are sold in more than 60 countries around the world, including Canada, Mexico, the United States, the United Kingdom, and Australia.

=== Pricing and collectability ===
Due to the demand for the toy, Squishmallows are often sold by resellers for an increased price. The average resale price for a Squishmallow depends on the size, condition, and rarity of the specific style. Some limited edition or high-demand Squishmallows are sold by resellers and collectors for hundreds or thousands of dollars. Jack the Black Cat, known for its closed white eyes and white whiskers, is one of the rarest Squishmallows sold to date. KellyToys introduced the limited edition stuffed animal on their website in 2020, where it sold out within two hours. Third-party websites like eBay host listings for Jack the Black Cat valued at nearly $20,000.

Among the many Squishmallows that are sold, some of the most popular include Connor the Cow, Malcolm the Mushroom, Archie the Axolotl, Benny/Brina the Bigfoots, and Philippe the Frog. There are reports that resellers are harassed and doxxed by the community. Controversy surrounds the concept of resellers and Squishmallows traders within the community.

=== Event-exclusive Squishmallows ===
Event-exclusive Squishmallows are generally considered rare and the odds of winning can be as low as approximately 1 in 10,000, such as the prize for Squishmallows Trading Card Sweepstakes: JSK Business Cat.

== Awards ==
Year	Award	Organization	Result	Ref
2021	Toy of the Year	Toy Association	Won	
2022	Toy of the Year	Toy Association	Won	
2022	People's Choice	Toy Association	Won	
2022	License of the Year	Toy Association	Won	
2022	Plush Toy of the Year	Toy Association	Won	
2023	Toy of the Year	Toy Association	Won	
2023	People's Choice	Toy Association	Won	
2023	Plush Toy of the Year	Toy Association	Won	
2023	Collectible of the Year	Toy Association	Won	

== Philanthropy ==
Jazwares, Squishmallows' parent company, has a philanthropic arm called Jazwares Cares, which supports children's health, wellbeing and educational development through play, via donations, sponsorships, educational programs and volunteerism, primarily on Jazwares staff. The program often donates toys, including Squishmallows. In September 2023, it donated 10,000 limited edition "Star" Squishmallows to Make-A-Wish Foundation chapters in the U.S. and Canada. In December 2023, it partnered with the Stockton Kings to donate 1,700 toys to local families.

== See also ==
- Jellycat – British keychain and plush company
