= Holly Hill Mall and Business Center =

Shopping mall in North Carolina, U.S.

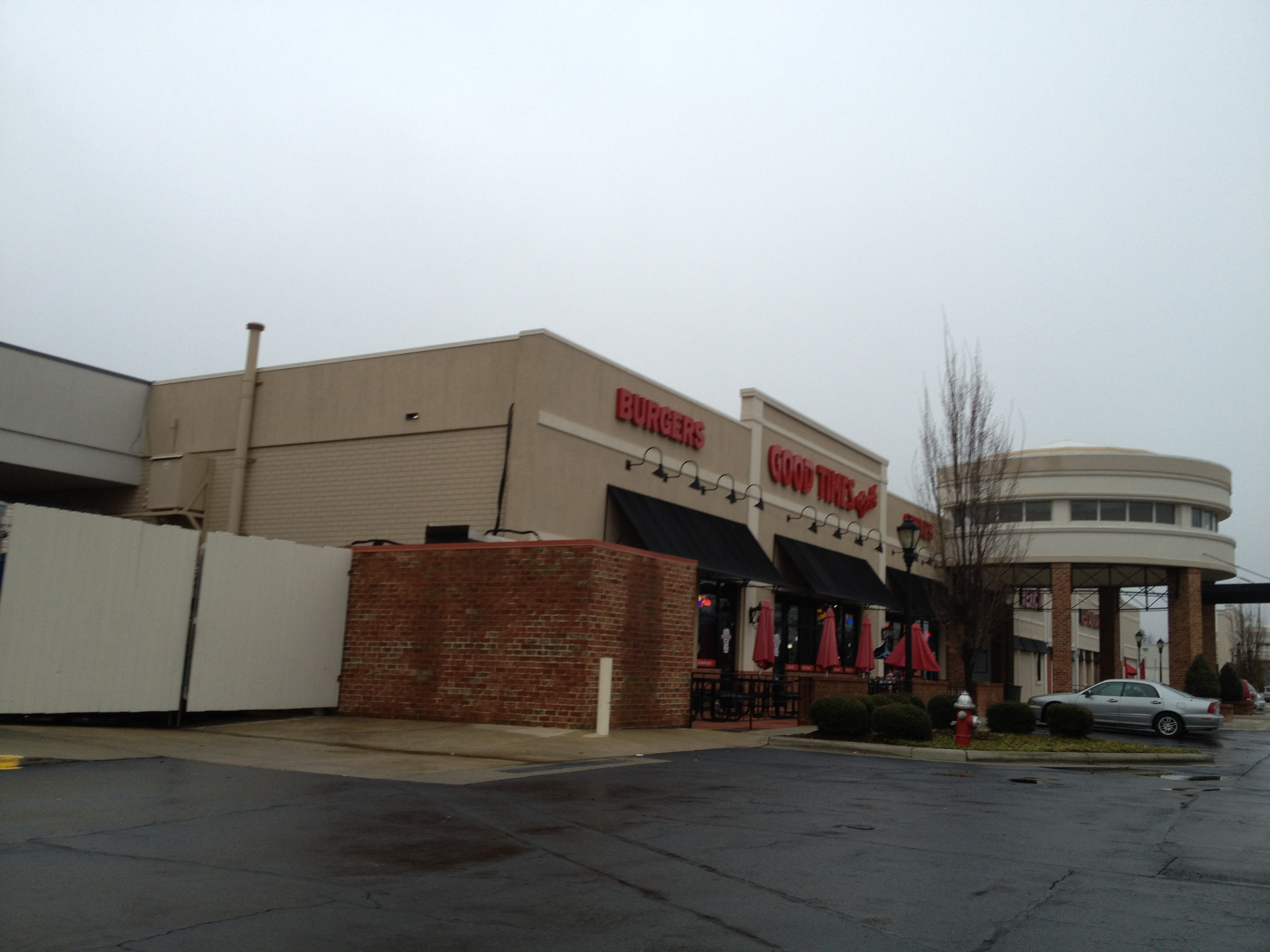
- Exterior view (January 2013)
- Location: Burlington, North Carolina, United States
- Coordinates: 36.0787°N 79.4872°W
- Opened: 1969
- Developer: Glenn Pickard, Jim Latham, Bill Price and Hugh Cummings
- Owner: Holly Hill Mall, LLC
- Num. of stores: 54
- Num. of anchor tenants: 4 (2 open, other 2 vacant)
- Floor area: 412,370 sq ft (38,310 m^{2})
- Floors: 1
- Website: hollyhillmall.com

Holly Hill Mall and Business Center (formerly known as Colonial Mall Burlington and Burlington Square Mall) is an enclosed shopping mall located in Burlington, North Carolina, United States. The mall's anchor stores are Dunham's Sports, and Dave's Furniture.

== History ==
Holly Hill Mall opened in 1969, in reference to the nearby neighborhood where it was located. At the time, the mall's anchor stores included Belk, Sears, and Woolworth, which eventually became Goody's. Its name was changed to Colonial Mall Burlington in 1999 after being bought out by Colonial Properties Trust. A major renovation of the mall's interior and exterior took place in 2004, adding skylights, new floor tiles, and new stores such as Hibbett Sports. Colonial sold the mall in 2005 to Prime Retail, at which point the mall's name was changed to Burlington Square Mall.

In 2007, Alamance Crossing, a lifestyle center complex opened less than two miles away. Both Belk and J. C. Penney left for the new mall, along with a number of smaller retailers. On July 8, 2008, it was announced that the mall was in foreclosure proceedings. The current owners purchased Holly Hill Mall from the bank.

On October 30, 2008, Goody's announced that its store would be closing all of their stores, including the one at Burlington Square Mall. Books-A-Million closed afterward. Trailhead Church of Burlington moved into what was the facility for a Gold's Gym in November 2009. Trailhead moved out of Holly Hill Mall in July 2010 after merging with Victory Worship Center in Graham, NC. Retaining the title Trailhead Church, the group now meets at 554 West Moore St. in Graham.

In May 2010 the mall was purchased by a group of local investors. To go along with the theme of 'going back to its roots,' the new owners renamed the mall Holly Hill Mall & Business Center. A number of local and national businesses have signed leases since the mall was sold in 2010. Also in 2011, Hamrick's clothing store opened in the former J. C. Penney, while Dave's Discount Furniture replaced the former Goody's. In 2012, Dunham's Sports opened in the former Belk. This store is both the first in North Carolina and the largest in the chain. Hamrick's closed in 2014.

On December 4, 2019, it was announced that Sears would be closing on January 15, 2020. It was demolished for a Publix supermarket which opened in 2021.
