= Marketplace Mall (Winston-Salem) =

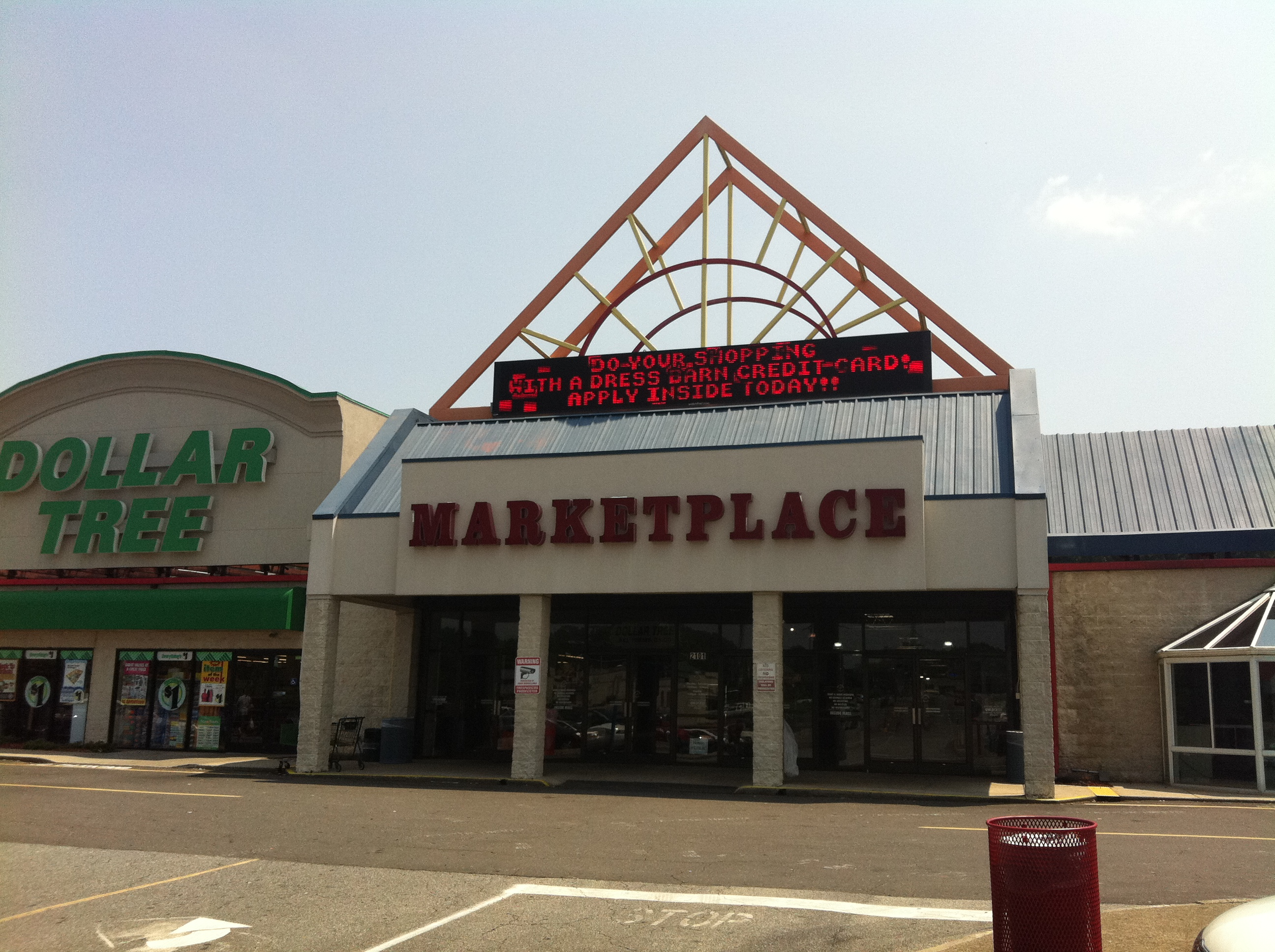
- Entrance to Marketplace Mall, July 2011
- Location: Winston-Salem, North Carolina, United States
- Coordinates: 36.0704°N 80.2565°W
- Opened: 1984; 42 years ago

Marketplace Mall is a one-story and second shopping mall in Winston-Salem on NC 150 (Peters Creek Parkway) in Winston-Salem, North Carolina, United States. Its main anchor stores are Dollar Tree & Hamrick's.

The mall opened in 1984. Hamrick's was added in 1995. By 2003, the mall had lost the majority of its tenants, but a renovation begun that same year added several new retailers, including a furniture store called Dynasty. Dynasty closed in 2008 and was replaced by a Steve & Barry's clothing store. This store closed the same year and was replaced by a Veterans Affairs clinic in 2010.
