= Bunnies By The Bay =

American baby product chain

- Industry: Retail
- Founded: 1986
- Founders: Krystal Kirkpatrick; Suzanne Knutson; Jeanne-Ming Hayes
- Headquarters: Anacortes, Washington, United States
- Number of locations: 2 retail stores
- Area served: Worldwide
- Products: Buddy Blankets; Bye Bye Buddy Blankets; Wee Kiddo the Lamb; Blossom Bunny Buddy Blankets
- Services: Handmade stuffed animals; Custom embroidery on stuffed animals and baby blankets; Whitelabel stuffed animal design and production
- Owner: Bunnies By The Bay, Inc.
- Number of employees: 20
- Parent: Kids Preferred, Inc. (Former); Bunnies By The Bay, Inc. (Current)
- Website: bunniesbythebay.com

Bunnies By The Bay was founded in 1986 by sisters Suzanne Knutson and Krystal Kirkpatrick. The company's focus is on creating gifts for infants.

== Background ==
For several years, the sisters had a sewing workshop in Anacortes, Washington where they created plush bunnies in different outfits, each with its own name and a short section of verse.

During the economic downturn, the sisters were joined by Jeanne-Ming Hayes as a third founder. Together they redirected the company to its present focus on gifts for babies and toddlers.

In February 2013, Kids Preferred acquired Bunnies by the Bay. In July 2019, Bunnies By The Bay separated from Kids Preferred and returned to the original owners.

== Retail locations ==
Bunnies By The Bay has two retail locations in the northwest region of Washington state in the towns of La Conner and Anacortes. All Bunnies By The Bay products are available worldwide through boutiques, gift shops, major retailers, and in their online shop.

Bunnies By The Bay was one of the few toy companies included in the November 2018 re-opening of the famed FAO Schwarz toy store in New York. The company was included in the international openings of the FAO Schwarz Beijing, London, Dublin, Paris, Milan and Rome.
