= Alamance Crossing =

- Location: Burlington, North Carolina, United States
- Coordinates: 36.069299°N 79.512102°W
- Opened: August 1, 2007
- Developer: CBL & Associates Properties
- Manager: Spinoso Real Estate Group
- Owner: CBL & Associates Properties
- Num. of stores: 70+
- Num. of anchor tenants: 8
- Floor area: 855,000 square feet (79,432.1 m^{2})
- Floors: 1

Alamance Crossing is a lifestyle center (outdoor shopping mall) in Burlington, North Carolina, United States. Opened in 2007, it is the second shopping mall in the city, as well as the larger. Alamance Crossing comprises more than seventy tenants, including eight major anchor stores: Belk, Dillard's, JCPenney, Barnes & Noble, Hobby Lobby, Kohl's, Dick's Sporting Goods and BJ's Wholesale Club. It was developed by CBL & Associates Properties, who also manages it.

== History ==
Alamance Crossing opened its first phase on August 1, 2007. Its first two anchors were Belk and JCPenney, both of which relocated from existing stores at the smaller Burlington Square Mall, (now Holly Hill Mall) the town's existing shopping center. Hobby Lobby was added in 2008. A second phase brought in Dillard's and Barnes & Noble as additional anchors. A further expansion, completed in 2009, comprised a movie theater.

An expansion of Alamance Crossing in 2011 brought Kohl's, BJ's Wholesale Club and Dick's Sporting Goods to the center.
