= Sigikid =

German toy manufacturer

sigikid is a manufacturer of plush toys, baby's and children's fashion, toys and accessories, from Germany. The mother company "H. Scharrer & Koch GmbH" was founded in 1856 and initially produced glass beads in Bayreuth, Germany.

With a generational change in leadership in 1968, the company's focus shifted entirely to children's toys and was rebranded to sigikid, a fusion of the founder's nickname "Sigi" with kid.

sigikid is regarded as a pioneer in modern toys for children and has received many design awards. In the mid 90s, sigikid dominated the market for vinyl and porcelain artist dolls. Today, sigikid is mainly known for its organic toys, designer plush line and classic toys.
