= Germantown High School (Germantown, Tennessee) =

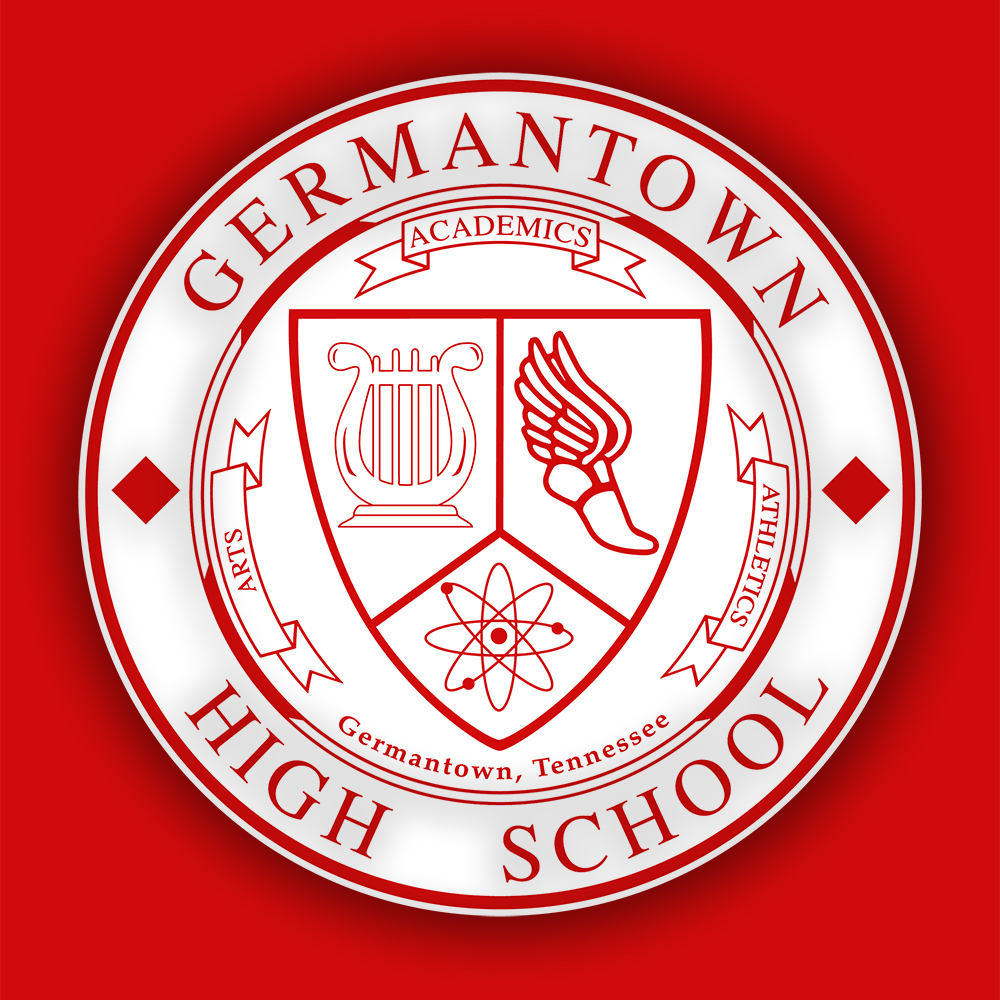

Location
- 7653 Poplar Pike; Germantown, Tennessee 38138; United States
- Coordinates: 35.0824°N 89.8078°W

Information
- Type: Public
- Established: 1910 (at present location)
- School district: Memphis-Shelby County Schools
- Principal: Dr. Jon Stencel
- Teaching staff: 96.70 (on an FTE basis)
- Grades: 9-12
- Enrollment: 1,765 (2023-2024)
- Student to teacher ratio: 18.25
- Campus: Suburban
- Colors: Red and white
- Nickname: Red Devils
- Website: schools.scsk12.org/germantown-hs

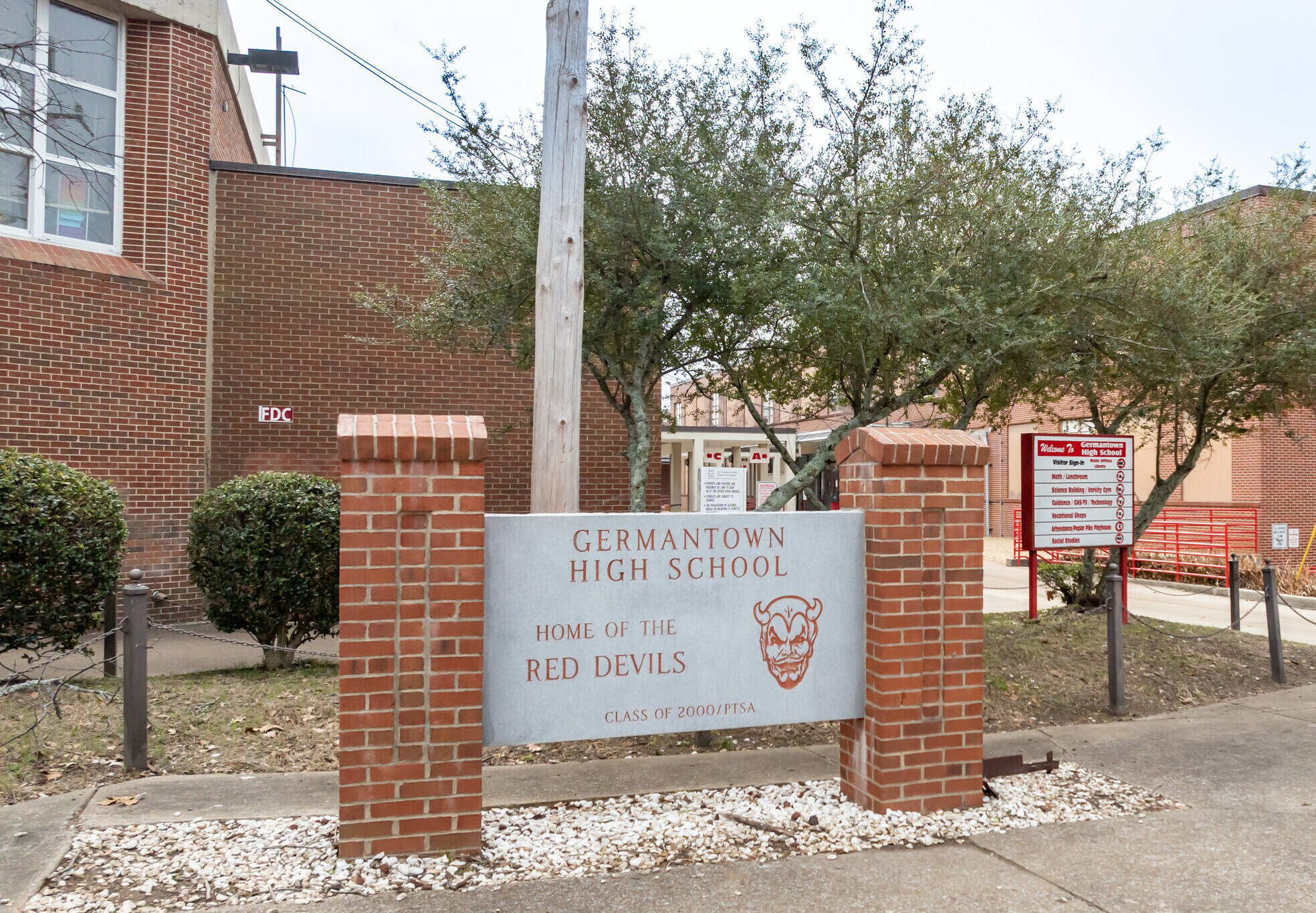
Germantown High School

Germantown High School is a public high school in Germantown, Tennessee, and is part of the Memphis-Shelby County Schools (MSCS) district.

== History ==
In 1889 the Germantown High School Association purchased a lot east of the Masonic Lodge on which to build a school. When that school burned two years later, classes resumed at the Masonic Lodge. Mabel C. Williams became principal of the school in 1905, but by 1909 she had been elected Superintendent of the Shelby County School System of which the Germantown school was a part.

In 1904 the Masonic Lodge burned to the ground, but a new lodge was completed in 1906. Three acres were purchased in 1910 for a school with grades one through twelve, and in 1911 students moved into the new building with five classrooms and a study hall.

Additional rooms and buildings were added to both sides of a WPA facade in 1918, 1919, 1927, and 1935 for the Germantown Public School. By 1931 the school had been renamed the Mabel C. Williams School.

In 1974, the Mabel C. Williams School was demolished and replaced by the current Germantown High School.

== Plans for New School ==
In May 2022, Tennessee House Bill 2430 was signed into law which would require Memphis-Shelby County Schools officials to transfer Germantown High School to the City of Germantown, Tennessee, barring an agreement being reached between all relevant parties.

In December 2022, an agreement was reached between the Memphis-Shelby County Schools Board of Education, the City of Germantown, Tennessee, the Germantown Municipal School District, and Shelby County, Tennessee, which would provide up to $110 million in funding for the construction of a new High School in nearby Cordova, Tennessee. This agreement allows for a transition period ending July 1, 2032 for completion of the new school. Ownership of the Germantown High property will transfer to the City of Germantown no later than that date.

In November 2024, the Memphis City Council voted to reject the permit for building the new school at the proposed location in Cordova, Tennessee near Fischer-Steele Road and Germantown Parkway. No plans for a new proposed location for the school have been announced.

== Athletics ==
Germantown High School offers a variety of sports: baseball, basketball, bowling, cross country, football, golf, cheerleading, soccer, softball, swimming, tennis, track and field, volleyball, wrestling, dance, and trap shooting.

- The football team won state championships in 1983 and 2003.
- The girls' soccer team won the state championship in 1994, 1999, and 2001.
- The boys' baseball team won the state championship in 1981, 1995, and 2001.
- The boys' golf team won the state championship in 1997.
- The girls' volleyball team won the state championship in 1983, 1985, 1988, 1989, 1990, 2003 and 2005.
- The boys' tennis team won the state championship in 1980 and 1981.

== Germantown High School Television (GHS-TV) ==
In 1982, Germantown Cablevision installed a $150,000 access studio in Germantown High School as part of its franchise agreement with the City of Germantown. Recognizing the studio's potential as a vital community asset, the City of Germantown allocated a substantial portion of its cable franchise fees to expand the studio and purchase additional equipment. In return, Germantown High School committed to collaborating with community groups, public organizations, and governmental agencies to develop new programming ideas. This initiative paved the way for GHS-TV to produce diverse public, government, and educational access programs.

Germantown High School Television (GHS-TV) now serves as the primary video communication asset for Memphis-Shelby County Schools (MSCS), delivering vital information to teachers, parents, and administrators about educational events, district activities, and key achievements. The station’s programming is focused on education, covering sports, academics, and the arts.

GHS-TV broadcasts live 24/7 via its website www.ghstv.org and on the access educational channel (C19) for the City of Memphis, as well as access Channel C17 for the City of Memphis.

GHS-TV has received numerous awards:

- 17-time winner of the Overall Excellence Award in Education by the Alliance for Community Media.
- Over 300 Hometown Video Awards.
- 90 regional and 20 national Student Emmys, awarded by the National Academy of Television Arts and Sciences.

== Notable alumni ==
- Mickey Callaway, professional baseball coach and former Major League Baseball player
- Ian Clark, basketball player for the Xinjiang Flying Tigers
- Antonius Cleveland (born 1994), basketball player in the Israeli Basketball Premier League
- Debbie Elliott, National Public Radio broadcaster
- Austin Hollins (born 1991), basketball player for Maccabi Tel Aviv of the Israeli Basketball Premier League
- Ben Johnson, Major League Baseball player
- Paul Maholm, Major League Baseball pitcher
- Susan Marshall, vocalist, pianist, songwriter and recording artist
- Jeremy Padawer, kids toys and entertainment executive, creator of Monsuno television series on Nickelodeon
- Cindy Parlow, US women's national soccer team and U.S. Soccer executive
- Chris Parnell, Saturday Night Live actor
- Missi Pyle, actress in Galaxy Quest, Dodgeball, and Broadway show Boeing Boeing Broadway
- Eric Still, Houston Oilers offensive guard
- Tony Williams, Jacksonville Jaguars defensive tackle
