= Teddy-Hermann =

Stuffed toy manufacturing company

Teddy-Hermann GmbH
- Company type: GmbH
- Predecessor: BE-HA Quality Germany
- Founded: Sonneberg, Germany (1912)
- Founder: Bernhard Hermann
- Headquarters: Hirschaid, Germany
- Products: Stuffed toys, notably teddy bears

Teddy-Hermann GmbH is an international manufacturer of teddy bears and other plush toys based in Hirschaid, Germany. Teddy-Hermann is one of the oldest teddy bear producers in Germany. Its products are highly valued among collectors.

== Products ==
The main products of Teddy-Hermann are teddy bears and other plush animals, including among others cats, dogs, monkeys, and birds. The company groups its products into three main lines: Hermann Teddy Original, Hermann Teddy Miniaturen, and Hermann Teddy Collection. The Hermann Teddy Original line is directed toward collectors and encompasses traditional and designer teddy bears as well as other animals, all of which are produced on premises in Hirschaid. The Hermann Teddy Miniaturen line encompasses teddy bears under 12 centimeters in length and is therefore unique among the offerings of other European teddy bear producers. Meanwhile, the Hermann Teddy Collection line is directed toward children and encompasses the widest range of plush animals.

Since its founding, Teddy-Hermann has gradually altered the range, materials, and designs of its products. The company has greatly increased the variety of teddy bears, developing the Hermann Teddy Collection and Hermann Teddy Miniaturen lines in the 1980s and 1990s respectively, and has expanded the representation of animals among its offerings. While Teddy-Hermann continues to use mohair in its Hermann Teddy Original line, it has shifted to the use of synthetic and other fabrics in its Hermann Teddy Collection line. The company has also redesigned its teddy bears to give them a softer, more childlike appearance.

== History ==
=== Founding ===
BE-HA Quality Germany, later renamed Teddy-Hermann, was founded in 1912 in Sonneberg, Germany, by Bernhard Hermann, who had previously spent several years working with his father Johann in the family business of crafting children's violins and later toys. The “BE-HA” part of the company name derived from the pronunciation of Bernhard Hermann's initials. During the first years of operation, the company produced its first plush toys.

=== Early years ===
Bernhard Hermann's wife Ida managed BE-HA Quality Germany when the former was conscripted into the German army to fight in World War I. The loss of labor and expertise the company suffered as a result of Bernhard Hermann's absence was compounded by the shortage of materials during wartime. Though Bernhard Hermann survived the war and returned to run the company, BE-HA Quality Germany continued to face great adversity, now in the form of hyperinflation. While Bernhard Hermann's company did not go out of business as a result of economic hardship, many other toy producers in Sonneberg did. One reason for the persistence of BE-HA Quality Germany was its commitment to quality, as the craftsmanship of other companies’ products sank during this period.

During the 1920s, BE-HA Quality Germany primarily produced teddy bears and other plush toys such as dogs. At the same time the company made stuffed dolls typical of the toy industry of Sonneberg, primarily so-called “mama dolls,” which had porcelain heads. It was also during the 1920s that Bernhard Hermann developed close business relations with international toy retailers, including FAO Schwarz, Woolworth, Knickerbocker, and Galeries Lafayette. These contacts greatly profited BE-HA Quality Germany, making the 1920s the company's “golden years.”

The golden years at BE-HA Quality Germany came to a decisive end with the Great Depression and the start of World War II. The Great Depression was especially bad for the company because of the sharp decline in the purchasing of toys and other such goods. Bernhard Hermann overcame this in part by contracting with toy distributors in Switzerland, which had been less affected by the Great Depression than other Western countries, though sales continued to suffer. The rise of the Nazis and advent of World War II led to new restrictions on BE-HA Quality Germany's operations, though the company was able to increase its sales during the late 1930s, selling its products exclusively in foreign markets in accordance with new German law.

In the 1930s, BE-HA Quality Germany began to alter the appearance of the bears, employing the so-called “Sonneberger Schnitt” (“Sonneberg cut”), which involved the separation and reattaching of teddy bear snouts to allow mixing and matching of snout and body fabrics. The company also began to give its teddy bears a more childlike appearance, giving the toys larger eyes and placing them closer to center of the face.

=== Move to Hirschaid ===
After the Soviet occupation of eastern Germany, Bernhard Hermann selected Hirschaid in the American occupied zone as the new site of his company to avoid dispossession by the East German communist provisional government. In 1948 Bernhard Hermann sent his son Werner to Hirschaid to develop the company's presence at its new location. By 1953 the Hermann family had managed to flee to West Germany and completed the company's move, reconstituting it as the “Teddy Plüschspielwarenfabrik Gebr. Hermann KG.”

From the time after its relocation up until the end of the 1950s, Teddy-Hermann experienced enormous growth, owing in part to the so-called West German Wirtschaftswunder, and adopted the branding “Hermann Teddy Original,” which was borne on the also newly introduced Teddy-seal brand. During this period the company produced as many as 500,000 plush toys a year and began introducing many new series of plush animals, including squirrels, dogs, rabbits, pandas, penguins, and horses. After Bernhard Hermann's death in 1959 and his sons Helmut, Arthur, and Werner's assumption of leadership, the company continued to grow and issue new series of toys throughout the 1960s. Throughout these two decades, the importance of Teddy-Hermann's domestic market overshadowed that of its international one. The company's growth was stemmed in the 1970s by inflation and competition with East Asian imports, which caused the prices of Teddy-Hermann's products to rise and in turn a decline in sales. In response to this decline, the company reduced its workforce and eliminated one of its production facilities.

=== New Leadership ===
In the 1980s and 1990s the company came under the leadership of Arthur and Werner Hermann's daughters, Margit Drolshagen, Marion Mehling, and Traudel Mischner, and began to develop its current three lines of plush toys. A growing market for collectors in the United States and United Kingdom in the 1980s led to the creation of the Gebrüder Hermann Fan Club. Collectors’ interest in Teddy-Hermann products remained high throughout the 1990s in the United States, where at the peak of popularity there were over 250 Teddy-Hermann dealers. In 1991 the company became a limited company, adopting the name “Gebr. Hermann GmbH & Co. KG”; later, the company adopted the name “Teddy-Hermann GmbH.” In order to keep prices low for the children's teddy bear market, Teddy-Hermann introduced in 1990 its Hermann Teddy 2000 line, later renamed Hermann Teddy Collection, whose products were manufactured in East Asia. In the mid-1990s the company introduced its Hermann Teddy Miniaturen line. In 2000 Teddy-Hermann introduced its Teddy-Hermann Collectors’ Club.
