= Webkinz =

Stuffed animal brand and video game series

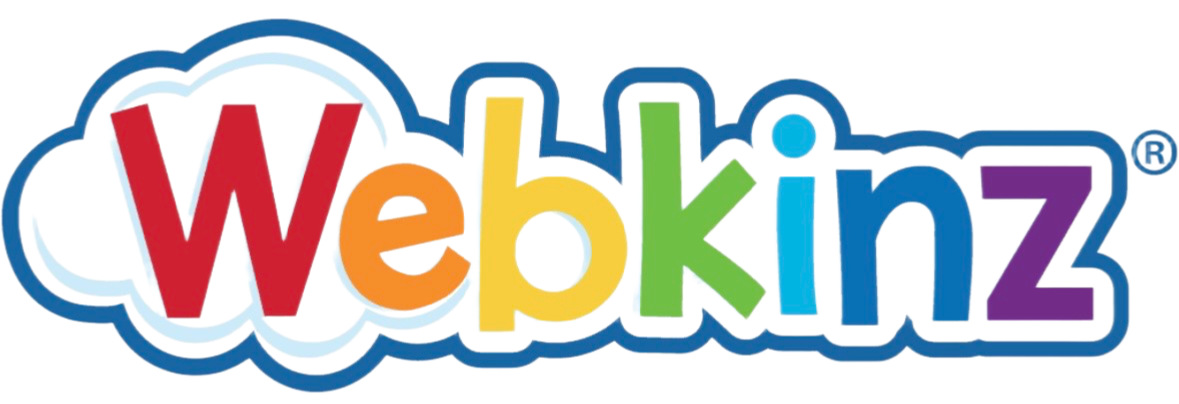
- Developer: Ganz
- Type: Virtual world, massively multiplayer online game
- Launched: Webkinz Classic; April 15, 2005; Webkinz Next; October 23, 2020
- Platforms: Android, App Store, Browser, macOS, Windows
- Status: Active
- Website: webkinz.com

Webkinz is a plush toy line and toys-to-life virtual world franchise created by the Canadian soft toy and home décor company Ganz. The brand combines collectible stuffed animals with a connected digital experience, where each plush includes a code that unlocks a virtual version of the pet online.

The franchise currently consists of two main games: Webkinz Classic, the original 2D virtual world, and Webkinz Next, a 3D version of the game. Both versions operate simultaneously and receive ongoing content updates.

== Gameplay ==
Webkinz gameplay centers on adopting pets and caring for them in a customizable virtual world. After redeeming a code from a plush toy or adopting a digital pet, players access features such as:

- Room building & home design: Create rooms, place furniture, expand homes, and decorate themed environments.
- Pet care: Feed, wash, play with, and level up pets based on happiness and health.
- Arcade & minigames: Interactive games that reward in-game currency. (KinzCash)
- Challenges & quests: Structured tasks that unlock items and bonuses.
- Earning currencies: In-game money (KinzCash) and premium currency (eStore Points) for buying items, décor, clothing, and activities.
- Social features: Friend lists, messaging, trading, multiplayer zones, and community events.

== History ==
The development for Webkinz started in late 2003, starting off with the plush toys. To further promote the toys, Howard Ganz, the owner of the Ganz company, wanted to create a new play experience based around discovery. This idea of play was inspired by the Cabbage Patch Kids. Soon, the idea of the plush toy "coming to life" was then made and expanded upon by Karl Borst, the creative director of Webkinz.

The game was originally made to be in 3D. However, due to the amount of time that would be taken to model the number of pets and with the difficulties in animation, this idea was scrapped in favor for 2D. This then led to a 2D skeleton system to be made which can be applied to multiple different pets. With this, the team was able to continuously add new pets. The game was made using Adobe Flash and ActionScript 1, 2, and 3. The art was made using Adobe Illustrator.

Throughout the development of the game, multiple playtests were conducted. From this, the team was allowed to gain an understanding of the audience's reactions and understanding of the game was at the time. New ideas were also learned from these playtests which the team took and further developed. One playtest, occurring in August 2004, ended with the team scrapping some finished work and concepts. This led to the team missing their plan of releasing the game during the holidays.

After the site’s premiere in 2005, users could register the code on the tag of their plush toys and play games with the virtual version of their adopted Webkinz pet. The original site had among its features a few games in the arcade section, the “W-Shop” where users could use their in-game points for virtual items, and the ability to customize the pets’ rooms, but many more interactive features have been added to Webkinz World since, including a school (called the “Kinzville Academy”) where users can play minigames which improve their pets’ abilities, and a trivia section where users can earn points for answering questions.

In 2015, a decade after the site’s launch, Ganz introduced a major update to the game (called Webkinz X), which had been failing due to certain technical errors in the coding. Webkinz X improved many of these problems, but also created many more, as the unique mixture of new code and code as old as 2005 resulted in several hundred in-game objects disappearing, or otherwise not functioning properly; the animation joints of some Webkinz avatars also were affected, often resulting in an awkward and disjointed appearance.

The Webkinz World site was run by Adobe Flash, and in 2018, in accordance with Adobe’s decision to no longer support Flash Player, Ganz worked with Adobe to convert the entire game interface from an embedded Flash Player-driven web game into a desktop app, which can be downloaded directly from the Webkinz website.

On October 23, 2020, Ganz launched Webkinz Next, a 3D reimagining of the original Webkinz.

On October 14, 2025, Ganz announced the "early access", in-development launch of a browser version of Webkinz Classic, which contains converted Flash content for modern browsers.

=== 2020 data breach ===
In April 2020, a hacker gained access to the login information of almost 23 million players, which was later leaked. As a response to this, Ganz later strengthened their encryption and required all Webkinz users to reset their passwords.

== Webkinz plush ==
Webkinz

The standard Webkinz plush includes a code that unlocks a virtual version of the pet on the Webkinz website.

Lil’ Kinz

Lil’ Kinz are smaller, less expensive versions of the regular plush. They unlock the same virtual content as standard Webkinz, though the in-game avatar appears smaller.

Signature Collection (2009–2013)

The Webkinz Signature line was produced through a partnership between Ganz and an external 3rd party toy manufacturer. These plushes featured higher-quality materials and more realistic designs. The line included three sub-categories:

- Webkinz Signature
- Webkinz Small Signature
- Webkinz Signature Endangered – Based on real endangered species and included an educational trivia section in-game.

Purchasing a Signature plush unlocked exclusive Signature-themed virtual items. Production ended in December 2013 after the contract with the partnering company expired. Ganz continues to release new Signature pet codes through the Ganz eStore without their plush counterparts, with certain pets only available as special promotional items.

Themed Virtual Pet Series

Birthstone Pets (2009–2010)

Released monthly from May 2009 to April 2010, the Birthstone Pets were digital-only brightly colored dogs featuring the corresponding month’s gemstone.

Zodiac Pets (2010)

Introduced in April 2010 as the successor to the Birthstone line. These pets were also digital-only, released monthly, and featured a wider variety of species, including an eagle, snake, horse, crab, and butterfly.

CandyKinz (2011)

Originally released as virtual-only dessert-themed pets. Select CandyKinz later received plush counterparts, such as the Gingerbread Puppy.

Rockerz Pets (2012)

A line of rock-themed pets. Physical Rockerz plushes unlocked both a virtual pet and an exclusive Rockerz-themed virtual item. Later Rockerz releases were digital-only.

Production Changes and Modern Releases

End of First-Generation Plush (2019)

In 2019, Ganz announced the discontinuation of first-generation Webkinz plush toys. New physical pets were paused, though virtual-only pets continued to be released through the Ganz eStore.

Return of Plush for Webkinz Next (2020)

In November 2020, plush production resumed for Webkinz Next. These toys include two codes per pet:

- one for Webkinz Classic
- one for Webkinz Next

2025 - 2026 Webkinz Plush Release

On October 15, 2025, Ganz released twelve new Webkinz plush toys, each featuring a tag with two codes that can be redeemed in both Webkinz Classic and Webkinz Next. In December of the same year, three more were released. In February 2026, five additional plush toys were introduced.

== Versions ==
Webkinz Classic

The original Webkinz world, known for its 2D art style and expansive catalog of items and pets. Classic includes long-standing features such as the Arcade, Curio Shop, Kinzville Academy, KinzStyle clothing, and seasonal events. It remains active with new updates and monthly collectible releases.

Webkinz Next

A reimagining of Webkinz that features 3D pet models, multiplayer environments, housing systems, professions, and crafting.

== Membership and monetization ==
Webkinz uses a hybrid model of free and paid memberships. Free accounts offer access to most basic features, while adopting a pet or purchasing a deluxe membership provides extra in game features.

Revenue is also generated through the sale of plush toys, digital pets, virtual items, deluxe memberships and optional premium currency purchases. Both Classic and Next maintain accessible gameplay for free players.

== Ganz eStore ==
The Ganz eStore is the official online marketplace for purchasing virtual items, pets, and premium currency (eStore points) for use within the Webkinz franchise. Launched as a companion service to the main game, the eStore allows players to buy digital goods that cannot be obtained through regular gameplay, including exclusive furniture sets, clothing items, room themes, seasonal collectibles, and specialty pets.

The eStore operates on a microtransaction model, offering items individually as well as through bundles and rotating promotional sales. It also provides access to Deluxe Memberships, which grant players additional monthly rewards, bonus currency, and members-only features within both Webkinz Classic and Webkinz Next. Holiday themes, limited-time events, and yearly collectible series are typically released through the eStore, making it a major part of Webkinz’ monetization and item distribution system.

== W-Plus merchandise ==
General merchandise

In addition to plush toys, Ganz produced a wide range of licensed merchandise to promote the Webkinz franchise. Items released included body spray, lip gloss, bookmarks, pet clothing, pet carriers, apparel, mouse pads, ornaments, pencil cases, school supplies, and collectible figurines. Plush toys based on in-game characters, such as Wacky Zingoz and Zumbuddies, were also produced. These products included Secret Codes redeemable in the Code Shop to unlock virtual items for players’ pets.

Trading cards

Overview

Webkinz trading cards were released in four series. Each pack contained six cards featuring illustrations, Webkinz pets, items, and recipes, as well as a code that could be redeemed for exclusive in-game items or themed room décor. The distribution of card types differed across each series.

Series 1

Series 1 contained 80 cards and introduced several specialty types:

- Challenge Cards – A set of 15 cards used to build decks for a card-based mini-game.
- Curio Shop Curiosities – Foil cards featuring rare Curio Shop items.
- Webkinz Doodlez – Sketch-style artwork showing early concept designs from the game.

Series 2

Series 2 contained 85 cards, adding new characters and items introduced to the site after the first series. It also expanded the specialty selection with:

- Challenge Cards – 15 new cards added to the existing set.
- W-Tales Snapshots – A foil set of eight cards depicting illustrations from Webkinz storylines.
- At Paw Level – A foil set of eight cards showing in-game items from a pet’s point of view.

Series 3

Series 3 introduced a revised card format, featuring full-art fronts and Webkinz trivia on the reverse. Two new specialty types were added:

- Webkinz Profilez – Cards featuring photographs of plush toys alongside pet facts.
- Webkinz Sticker Cards – Sticker sheets with pets, items, and game logos.

This series also introduced the Magical Retriever, a pet exclusive to the trading card line.

Series 4

Series 4 contained 90 cards and introduced a new W-Tales storyline told across all cards in the series. Sticker cards were expanded to include more stickers, along with a new Dressed Up subset. The series also contained two puzzles, with pieces found on the backs of sticker cards:

- Standard sticker cards completed one puzzle.
- Dressed Up sticker cards completed the second.

Series 4 also introduced the Magical Panda, another trading-card-exclusive pet.

== Community and cultural impact ==
The franchise maintains an active multigenerational fanbase, including long-time players, new players, and adults revisiting their childhood. Both Webkinz Classic and Webkinz Next continue to receive updates in 2026, preserving the brand’s legacy as a long-running, changing online world.
