= Mary Meyer Corporation =

American Toy Company

The doorway into the Mary Meyer Corporation office

Mary Meyer Corporation is a manufacturer of plush stuffed toys, founded by Mary (Lorang) Meyer in 1933. This business is located in Townshend, Vermont and is still family-run with four of Mary Meyer's grandchildren running the day-to-day operations.

The company sells over 400 products, including Marshmallow Zoo, Putty Toys, Fab Fuzz, FlipFlops, Baby, Taggies and WubbaNub toys along with several Oppenheim Gold Seal award-winning plush toys.

== History ==
Mary Meyer (née Lorang) was a seamstress who, along with her two children and husband, Hans, moved to rural Townshend, Vermont, from New York City. With America in the midst of the Great Depression, Mary made extra money by selling pincushions in addition to her sewing work.

By early 1931, she had expanded her products into children's stuffed toys using fabric left over from her sewing projects. These toys started as gifts for her own children and friends, but soon became a source of income for the family. As Mary’s stuffed toys grew in popularity, she and her husband would travel around selling the stuffed animals while their staff stayed behind and created the stuffed toys.

Officially starting the business in 1933, Mary Meyer Stuffed Toys has now grown into a national and international brand selling gifts for children and is a growing presence in the baby products market. Among the family members who continue to run the company, Kevin Meyer (grandson) is president and Steven Meyer (grandson) is the lead designer.
