= Jazwares =

American toy company

- Type: Private
- Industry: Entertainment
- Founded: 1997; 29 years ago, in Sunrise, Florida, U.S.
- Founder: Judd Zebersky
- Headquarters: Plantation, FL, U.S.
- Area served: Worldwide
- Key people: David Neustein, CEO, Jeremy Padawer, President
- Products: Toys; Games; Action figures; Dolls; Toy cars; Plush; Building sets; Live events
- Brands: Hello Kitty; KPop Demon Hunters; Squishmallows
- Owner: Berkshire Hathaway
- Website: jazwares.com

Jazwares, LLC is an American company headquartered in Plantation, Florida that designs and manufactures toys and other consumer products. As of 2022, the company is owned by investment holding company Berkshire Hathaway. The company is best known for its Squishmallows plush toy line.

== History ==
Jazwares was founded in Sunrise, Florida in 1997 by Judd Zebersky, who left his practicing law career to start the company. Zebersky spent six months visiting factories in China and learning the toy manufacturing process before starting Jazwares, after his wife told him to pursue his dream of "making toys." His wife, Laura Zebersky, also a lawyer, joined in 2005 after selling her practice. The two met in University of Miami School of Law in 1990.

The company launched its first product, oversized plastic cups called Big Sippers, in 1998. The novelty cups were molded to resemble WWE wrestlers and characters from the animated TV series The Simpsons and Pokémon. Since then, the company has focused heavily on licensing entertainment brands for toys, eventually moving to include video games and YouTubers.

In 2008, Jazwares acquired the license to Sega's video game mascot Sonic The Hedgehog and used that license to make action figures and stuffed toys. Eight years after the rights to the Sonic license lapsed in 2014, a Sonic Squishmallow was released in December 2022. In April 2013, video game developer Mojang Studios appointed Jazwares as its license partner for its game Minecraft. Jazwares released its first line of action figures, plush toys and paper craft items in December 2013.

In January 2026, Judd and Laura Zebersky announced that they would be stepping down from Jazwares. The company's chief operating officer, David Neustein, became chief executive officer in March 2026. David joined Jazwares in 2012 as COO, managing operations across the Americas, Asia and Europe, as well as overseeing the company's product development, supply chain and business processes.

=== Alleghany ===
In July 2014, Alleghany Corporation completed a minority equity investment in Jazwares. A second Alleghany Corporation equity investment was closed in April 2016, which led to majority stake in Jazwares. It is one of eight portfolio companies Alleghany owns outside of the insurance industry.

In 2017, Jazwares partnered with Hasbro and started releasing Nerf-branded products, such as targets and sports equipment.

In July 2018, Jazwares partnered with video game developer Epic Games to create licensed toys based on its online game Fortnite. That partnership was renewed in 2022, with Jazwares as the exclusive producer of 2" and 4" action figures for the game.

In October 2019, Jazwares acquired Wicked Cool Toys, which focused on licensed toys from brands such as Pokémon, Cabbage Patch Kids, and Tyler Blevins' Ninja. In 2019, the company also announced a partnership with YouTube children's entertainer Blippi.

In February 2020, the K-pop band BLACKPINK announced a collaboration with Jazwares to create dolls in their likenesses. In April 2020, Jazwares acquired toymaker Kellytoy, which had created the Squishmallows brand in 2017. That followed a partnership with Kellytoy that started in February 2019 to promote Jazwares' Russ Berrie brand.

In 2021, Jazwares began a costume division, starting with costumes and accessories based on Marvel Comics superhero characters, which were released in North America. In January 2023, Jazwares signed an agreement with grocery store chain Kroger to have the chain sell costumes in their retail locations. In May 2021, Jazwares launched action figures based on the video game Halo via a stop-motion video using the action figures on the Halo YouTube channel.

=== Berkshire Hathaway ===
In March 2022, Berkshire Hathaway purchased Alleghany. Jazwares commissioned Warren Buffett and Charlie Munger Squishmallows to commemorate Jazwares' appearance as a portfolio company at the Berkshire Hathaway annual shareholders festival. The Squishmallows later appeared on auction site eBay for $450. In a 2023 interview, the Zeberskys said they are working closely with Buffett successor Greg Abel.

In May 2023, Jazwares announced the move of its headquarters to a new building in Plantation on SW 6th Court, after more than 25 years in nearby Sunrise on Shotgun Road along the southwest corner of the Sawgrass Interchange.

In June 2023, Jazwares announced a partnership with fast food restaurant chain McDonald's to produce Squishmallows Happy Meal toys.

== Acquisitions ==
Jazwares acquisitions include First Act, Russ Berrie, Zag Toys, Wicked Cool Toys and Kellytoy.

== Brands ==
Jazwares offers product lines for various age groups and interests, including action figures, plush toys, collectibles, role-playing accessories and musical instruments. Examples include BumBumz, Hello Kitty, KPop Demon Hunters, Avatar: The Last Airbender, and BLDR. The company has engaged in partnerships with entertainment and media properties and has developed products based on licensing fictional characters from popular franchises such as Star Wars, Pokémon, Marvel, Halo, All Elite Wrestling, Fortnite, and Five Nights at Freddy's.

=== Roblox ===
In 2018, Jazwares partnered with the online game platform Roblox to create toys based games, characters, and developers in the Roblox universe, such as Roblox action figures. It was Roblox's first foray into merchandising. In May 2022, Jazwares entered a licensing agreement with Uplift Games for its Role-playing video game Adopt Me!, which was developed for and played on the Roblox platform. In June 2023, Jazwares announced a collaboration with Roblox game developers to launch "DevSeries," which would produce toys and other consumer products based on popular Roblox games.

== Recognition ==
Jazwares has received awards including the "Vendor of the Year" award by Toys "R" Us, the 2022 Good Housekeeping Best Toy Award (for Big Fat Yarn Plush Décor Kit and First Act Roll Up Drum Pad), and the annual Kidscreen Hot50 list. Squishmallows has won several awards including the Toy Association's overall Toy of the Year award, Plush Toy of the Year, License of the Year, and People's Choice.
