= TransRe =

American financial services company

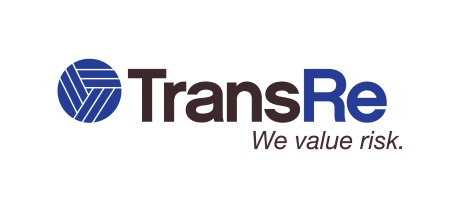
- Type: Private
- Industry: Reinsurance
- Founded: 1977; 49 years ago
- Headquarters: New York, USA
- Key people: Kenneth Brandt, Chairman, President & CEO
- Number of employees: 650

TransRe was established in 1977 to offer reinsurance across property, casualty, and specialty risks.

TransRe is the brand name for Transatlantic Holdings Inc. and its subsidiaries (including Transatlantic Reinsurance Company). From 1991–2012 the company was traded on the NYSE. In 2012, TransRe became a wholly owned subsidiary of Alleghany Corporation, which in turn became a wholly owned subsidiary of Berkshire Hathaway in October 2022.

== History ==
TransRe was formed as a facultative reinsurance division of AIG and wrote its first business on January 1, 1978.

TransRe quickly expanded to other territories including Toronto in 1980, Europe (London) and Asia Pacific (Tokyo) in 1982 and Hong Kong in 1985. The company established the Latin America and Caribbean division in Miami, FL in 1993 and continued to expand globally with further offices in Paris, Zurich, Munich, Buenos Aires, Rio de Janeiro, Singapore, Shanghai, Johannesburg and Sydney, Hamilton, Luxembourg.

== Operations ==
TransRe provides treaty and facultative Property & Casualty reinsurance through brokers and directly to insurance companies worldwide. The company is structured in regional divisions: North America, Latin American & The Caribbean, Europe, Middle East & Africa, and Asia Pacific, with over 20 offices in 16 territories.

TransRe has six principal operating subsidiaries:

Principal Operating Subsidiaries
1. Transatlantic Reinsurance Company
2. TransRe London Limited
3. TransRe Europe S.A.
4. Fair American Insurance and Reinsurance Company
5. Fair American Select Insurance Company
6. Calpe Insurance Company Limited
