= Kids Preferred =

American toy company

Kids Preferred, LLC
- Type: Private
- Founded: 1983; 43 years ago
- Founder: Louis Premselaar
- Headquarters: East Windsor, New Jersey, U.S.
- Area served: Worldwide
- Key people: Larry Presser (President)
- Website: kidspreferred.com

Kids Preferred is a manufacturer of children's infant & preschool toys located in East Windsor, New Jersey, with additional offices in Hong Kong and Shanghai. The company was founded by Louis Premselaar in 1983.

The company currently designs, manufacturers and distributes licensed infant & preschool toys for evergreen brands including: The Tale of Peter Rabbit, Star Wars, Curious George, Disney, Goodnight Moon, Miffy, Godzilla, Hasbro, Jurassic Park, Scooby Doo, DC Comics, Carter's, Harry Potter, Guess How Much I Love You, Llama Llama, Sesame Street, Rudolph the Red-Nosed Reindeer, and The World of Eric Carle products.
