= Ganz Midwest-CBK =

Canadian toy company

Ganz
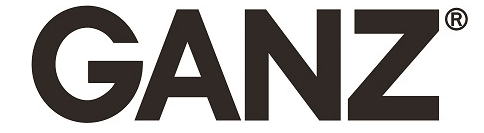
- Logo for Ganz used since 2019, but first introduced in October 2018 with the Midwest-CBK logo next to it before the brand was phased out in 2019
- Formerly: Ganz Bros (1950-1996) Ganz Toys (1996-2000); Ganz Gifts (2000-2018); Ganz (2000-2018, 2019-present) Ganz Midwest-CBK (2018-present)
- Industry: Manufacturer / Importer
- Genre: Home décor and toy manufacturer
- Founded: 1950
- Founder: Samuel Ganz and children Sam, Jack and Miriam
- Headquarters: Woodbridge, Ontario, Canada
- Products: Webkinz
- Divisions: Ganz World (2005-present)
- Subsidiaries: Midwest-CBK (2012-2018)
- Website: http://www.ganz.com/

Ganz Midwest-CBK LLC (also known as simply Ganz) is a Canadian soft toy and home décor company, famous for its plush animals and collectibles. They are the manufacturer of Webkinz, a toy with an interactive virtual-reality Internet site for children.

Founded in 1950 by Holocaust survivors Samuel Ganz and his sons Jack and Sam Ganz, it was originally called Ganz Bros Toys and sold products for the Canadian home market. They were also carnival suppliers and manufactured many products in their own factory. A private company with headquarters just north of Toronto in Woodbridge, Ontario, Ganz is known as a user of Ty's copyrighted TyTips fabric, which is used for several of the older Webkinz.

The success of Webkinz, first released in 2005, and other similar items helped the fortunes of the Ganz family who then decided to start The Webkinz Foundation. The Webkinz Foundation was a charitable organization that focused on supporting children's programs worldwide and provided the company with valuable marketing and tax benefits. It quietly closed in 2015.

On October 2, 2012, Ganz bought Midwest-CBK, a Minnesota based home décor company founded in 1979. They eventually merged in October 2018.

== Product lines ==
=== Current ===
==== Ganz World ====
- Webkinz: A line of plush animals with a secret code that unlocks an online world to explore. These are designed for children from ages 6–13. Since their launch in 2005, the Webkinz line has made Ganz grow in value and has received interactive online site awards. Webkinz plush toys can be found around the world.

==== Other ====
- Heritage Collection: A plush line that features a variety of stuffed animals designed by Ganz, ranging in new and vintage styles.
- Soft Spots: A line of small plush animals with soft, fuzzy material and will make a sound if squeezed.
- Tubby Tummies: Large pot-bellied plush, ranging in designs of teddy bears and other animals.
- Silly Scoops: Miniature collectible plushies based on a combination of animals and ice cream flavors
- Butterbits Lane: Line of small plush animals

=== Former ===
Ganz logo, used from 1996 until 2018. Still used for many Ganz products and services.

==== Ganz World ====
- Webkinz Jr: A line of plush animals made with soft material. They are designed for children from ages 3–6. The site, similar to Webkinz, features an interactive online world where kids can play and learn. (closed January 31, 2018)
- Tail Towns: A site similar to Webkinz, but for ages 13+. You can access Tail Towns through the purchase of a Tail Towns Figurine. It was supposed to be released in March 2011 as a regular website, but instead opened on Facebook as a beta game called Tail Town Friends, which is similar to that of Webkinz Friends. (closed September 2, 2014)
- Amazing World: Amazing World was a 3D world where players can play with their Zings and decorate their land given to them in the game as well as complete tasks along the way. Plush toys and figurines are included in the line. There is also a beta game on Facebook called Amazing World Friends that is very similar to that of Tail Town Friends and Webkinz Friends. (closed January 31, 2018)
- Nakamas: Nakamas are plushes with long, skinny limbs and are aimed towards younger users. (merged with Amazing World)
- Zoey's Design Academy: A game on the computer about making designs on clothes. (closed August 30, 2014)
- Webkinz Friends: A game on Facebook for ages 13+. A spin-off of Webkinz (closed September 2, 2014)

==== Other ====
- Wrinkles: A line of plush toy dogs, that existed throughout the 1980s.
