= Teddy Atelier Stursberg =

Teddy bear manufacturer

Teddy Atelier Stursberg is an international company producing teddy bears since 1995. They started their business in Wuppertal, Germany later moved to Berlin, Germany. Since 2003 they worked in the UK.

The teddies are handmade items, made of high-quality materials (mainly Mohair). They are all limited to one item. The Teddy Atelier Stursberg sold a Teddy to the folk singer Carolyn Hester in 1997. This was the start of their international career. Teddy Atelier Stursberg has sold teddies to collectors all over the world. They have attended international fairs in Germany, Belgium, the Netherlands, and the UK.

The Teddy Museum in Berlin, Germany, has a range of their teddies on display. Teddy Atelier Stursberg was featured in various international Teddy and Doll magazines in Germany and the Netherlands.
