= Alleghany Corporation =

American investment company

- Type: Subsidiary
- Traded as: NYSE: Y
- Industry: Insurance
- Founded: 1929; 97 years ago
- Founders: Oris and Mantis Van Sweringen
- Headquarters: Times Square Tower; New York City, U.S.
- Key people: Joseph P. Brandon; (president & CEO); Jefferson W. Kirby; (chairman of the board)
- Products: Title insurance, others
- Revenue: ▲US$12.00 billion (2021)
- Operating income: ▲US$1.52 billion (2021)
- Net income: ▲US$1.03 billion (2021)
- Total assets: ▲US$32.27 billion (2021)
- Total equity: ▲US$9.19 billion (2021)
- Number of employees: 13,313 (2021)
- Parent: Berkshire Hathaway
- Website: alleghany.com

Alleghany Corporation is an American investment holding company originally created by the railroad entrepreneurs Oris and Mantis Van Sweringen as a holding company for their railroad interests. It was incorporated in 1929 and reincorporated in Delaware in 1984. On March 21, 2022, Berkshire Hathaway made an $11.6 billion offer to acquire the company, which completed in October 2022.

After the company's bankruptcy in the Great Depression, control of the company fell into the hands of Robert Ralph Young and Allan Price Kirby. Young used the company as a vehicle for his vendetta against the J.P. Morgan banking interests, who had financed the Van Sweringens and managed to defeat them and the Vanderbilt interests in a 1954 proxy fight for the New York Central Railroad. The failing New York Central was in worse shape than Young had bargained for and he committed suicide shortly after being forced to suspend the dividend in January 1958. After Young's death, his role in NYC management was assumed by his protégé Alfred E. Perlman. Although much had been accomplished to streamline NYC operations, in those tough economic times, mergers with other railroads were seen as the only possible road to financial stability. The most likely suitor became the NYC's former arch-rival Pennsylvania Railroad. During the early 1960s, New York Central negotiated a merger with the Pennsylvania Railroad (PRR), which was led by Stuart T. Saunders after 1963. Saunders had most recently led the Norfolk and Western Railway through a successful expansion through acquisition and mergers including the Virginian Railway, Nickel Plate Road and Wabash Railway. There was great hope that success would result from the NYC-PRR combination. Penn Central Transportation Company was formed by the merger on February 1, 1968. However, the underlying financial weakness of both former railroads, combined with the fact that the ICC forced the chronically weak New Haven Railroad into the system, doomed the Penn Central and bankruptcy was declared a little over 2 years later, on June 21, 1970. Many of the Penn Central railroad assets ended up in Conrail, formed in 1976. The bankruptcy of the Penn Central railroad mostly ended Alleghany's involvement in the railroad business.

The company's residual railroad investments led to president and CEO John J. Burns serving on the board of Burlington Northern Santa Fe Corporation from 1995 to 2004.

Now Alleghany Corporation focuses on the insurance business (property, casualty, surety and fidelity insurance). Until his death in February 2011, Allan Kirby's son, Fred M. Kirby 2nd, was the chairman of the board and a sometime member of the Forbes 400 list of richest Americans.

== Current portfolio ==
Alleghany's current portfolio includes:

- TransRe, a reinsurer acquired in 2012
- RSUI, an insurer acquired in 2003
- CapSpecialty, formerly Capitol Insurance Companies, an insurer acquired in 2002
- Alleghany Capital, which owns and manages middle market businesses, including:
  - Precision Cutting Technologies, a holding company for machine tool manufacturers Bourn & Koch, Diamond Technology Innovations, CID Performance Tooling, and Supermill
  - R.C. Tway Company (dba Kentucky Trailer), a trailer manufacturer for the moving industry
  - W&W/AFCO Steel, a steel fabricator and erector
  - Wilbert Funeral Services, concrete burial vault manufacturer
  - IPS-Integrated Project Services, a pharmaceutical and biotechnology service provider
  - Jazwares, a toy and consumer products company, and owner of Kellytoy and Wicked Cool Toys
  - Concord Hospitality, which develops, owns, and operates hotels for Hyatt, Hilton, Mariott, and other brands
- Alleghany Properties, a property company

=== Former holdings ===
Former holdings include:

- Chesapeake and Ohio Railway, now CSX Transportation
- PacificComp, an insurer acquired in 2007 Sold to CopperPoint Mutual in 2017.
- World Minerals, sold to Imerys in 2005
- Chicago Title, spun off in 1997, owned by Fidelity National Financial since 2000
- Underwriters Reinsurance Company, sold to Swiss Re American Holding Corporation in 2000
- IDS Property Casualty Insurance Company, sold to American Express in 1984
- The Shelby Insurance Company, sold to The Associated Group in 1991
- Stranded Oil Resources Corporation, an oil exploration and production company, sold to Laredo Oil at the end of 2020.
