= Jellycat =

British keychain and plush company

Jellycat Limited
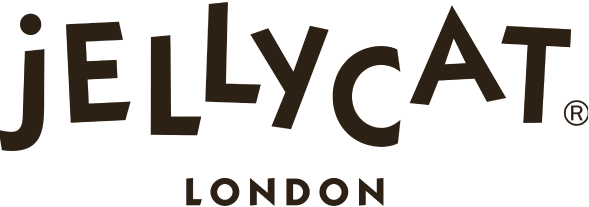
- Industry: Manufacturer and retailer
- Genre: Home décor and toy manufacturer
- Founded: 1999; 27 years ago
- Founder: Thomas and William Gatacre
- Headquarters: London, United Kingdom
- Number of locations: 6 shop-in-shops (2026)
- Key people: Mandy Pugh (CEO)
- Website: jellycat.com

Jellycat London is a British soft toy and keychain manufacturer and retailer, founded in London by brothers Thomas and William Gatacre. It is known for its plush toys and collectibles. Each plush toy is organised into a category or collection, such as gifts, Amuseables, bag charms, and animals.

== History ==
Jellycat was co-founded by two brothers, Thomas and William Gatacre in London in 1999. In 2001, the company expanded to Minneapolis, forming Jellycat Inc. While Jellycat mostly sells soft toys, it also sells books, nursery items, bags, blankets, keychains, and other accessories. It offers a range of products, from classic stuffed animals like rabbits and bears, to more whimsical creations in its Amuseables line, featuring playful designs such as smiling flowers and cheerful foods.

Jellycat Slackajack Monkey soft toy

As of 2024, the longest serving design within the contemporary collection is the Slackajack Monkey with 21 years in production. In February 2024, Jellycat celebrated its 25th anniversary, where the Institute of Contemporary Art in Boston hosted an anniversary party. The Jellycat company had greater financial success in 2025 when its profits doubled from the year prior, leading to more than $100 million in dividends paid to owners.

In June 2025, Jellycat stopped supplying to approximately 100 independent shops in the United Kingdom, citing its "brand elevation strategy". The change affected longstanding stockists including shops which had sold Jellycat products for over 20 years, and were told that the decision was "final" and that they would be unable to appeal. Another group of store owners were permitted to continue stocking Jellycat products but no longer were allowed to display a sticker in their shop window saying they were an "Official Jellycat Stockist".

As of 2025, Jellycat-owned shop-in-shops are present in many American cities, including the Jellycat Diner Experience at FAO Schwarz in Midtown Manhattan, New York. A Chicago location opened in late 2025, and also in 2025 Jellycat opened the Jellycat Ski Club, a temporary experience for two months in Los Angeles where exclusive merchandise was available for sale. In 2026, Jellycat opened locations in Milan, Copenhagen, and Stuttgart.

== Reception ==
Jellycat won Earnshaw magazine's Earnie Award in 2015 and 2018, within the Toys category. The company received the Outstanding Achievement Award at The Greats Awards in 2020. In 2024, the World Intellectual Property Organization (WIPO)'s Hague Yearly Review ranked Jellycat Limited's number of industrial design applications filled under the Hague System as 8th in the world, with 255 applications submitted during 2023.

Jellycat products have a strong social media presence, with the number of reported views on TikTok reaching several billion. The increasing popularity of the toys–helped by the online momentum–has led to stringent security measures being implemented by British retailers following a 'crime wave' of shoplifting and burglaries of Jellycat stockists. The thriving and profitable secondary market for Jellycat toys has been referred to as a "darker, stranger underbelly" to the Jellycat phenomenon, as it provides a ready outlet for thieves to dispose of stolen toys.

Jellycat toys appeal to both children and adult collectors. While Jellycat was originally marketed towards young children, adults have become a significant part of the consumer base, particularly Gen Z. Researchers have analysed that the growth amongst adult consumers were adults seeking comfort and nostalgia in the post-pandemic period. According to Bia Bezamat, from global marketing data company Kanta, Jellycat's popularity rise emerged from "a perfect storm of a post-pandemic need for escape, a need for comfort." These trends reflect how Gen Z prioritises mental health and find comfort with items that reflect childhood and nostalgia.

A Guinness World Records title was given to teenager Hope Roberts from Bedford, England in early 2026 for her Jellycat collection of 877 items.

In April 2026, Time named Jellycat as one of TIME100's Most Influential Companies of 2026.
