= Hamrick's =

American clothing store chain

Hamrick's Inc.
- Type: Private
- Industry: Clothing
- Founded: 1945
- Founder: Edna Hamrick; Oliver Hamrick
- Headquarters: Gaffney, South Carolina
- Area served: Virginia; Tennessee; North Carolina; South Carolina; Georgia

Hamrick's Inc. is a clothing store chain that serves the Southeastern United States. Its headquarters is located in Gaffney, South Carolina. Hamrick's has stores in Virginia, Tennessee, North Carolina, South Carolina and Georgia. The store is similar to a department store. Hamrick's also sells home goods and seasonal items. The company also creates its own private labels, including Southern Lady, Links, Seven Forty-Two, and N Touch.

== History ==
Hamrick's is a family-owned and operated business that has been in operation for more than 60 years.

Oliver and Edna Hamrick founded the company in 1945 when they bought a small grocery and general merchandise store in Gaffney, South Carolina. By the 1980s it had expanded to seven locations in South Carolina. Edna continued to work at the Gaffney store until her death in 2007.

Hamrick's currently has 21 outlets in South Carolina, North Carolina, Georgia, Tennessee, and Virginia.
