= Stuffed toy =

Fabric toy with a soft filling

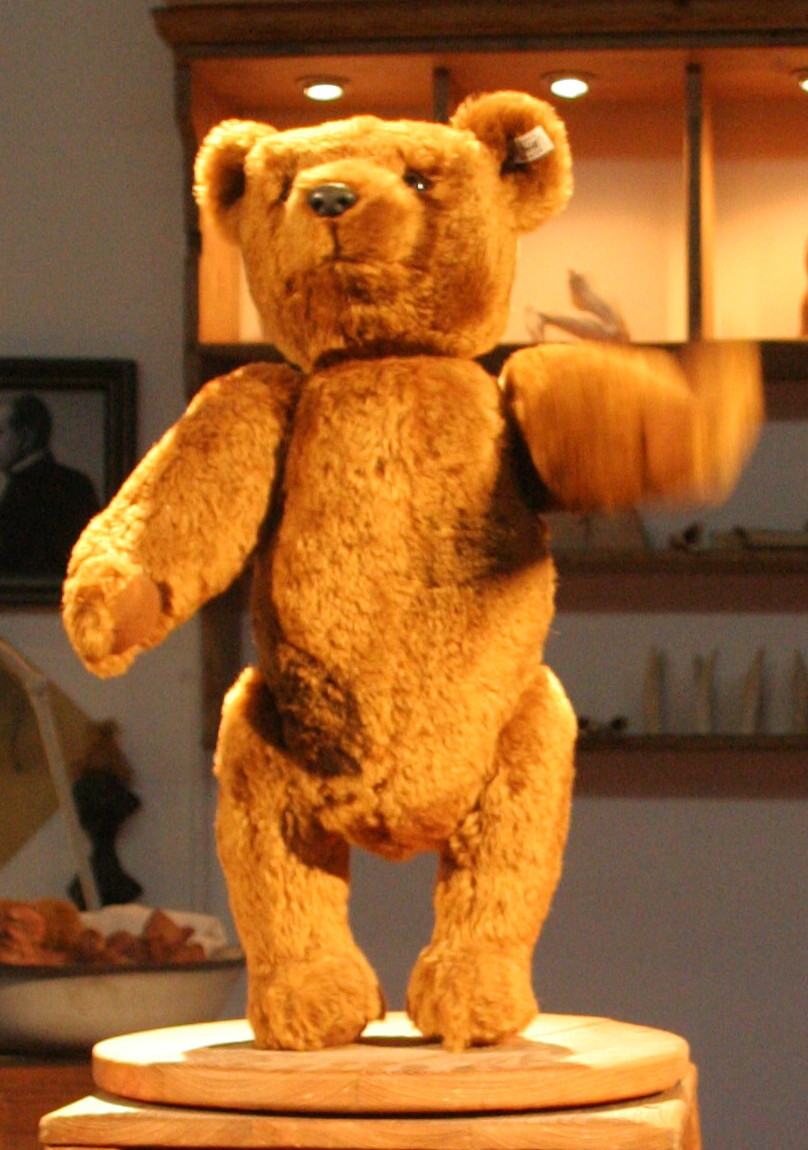
Replica of an original 1903 Steiff Bär PB 55 with moveable limbs, Steiff-Museum, Giengen, Germany

A stuffed toy is a toy with an outer fabric sewn from a textile and stuffed with flexible material. They are known by many names, such as stuffed animals, plush toys, plushies, stuffies and teddies; in Britain and Australia, they may also be called soft toys or cuddly toys. Stuffed toys are made in many different forms, but most resemble real animals (sometimes with exaggerated proportions or features), mythological creatures, cartoon characters, or inanimate objects. They can be commercially or home-produced from numerous materials, most commonly pile textiles like plush for the outer material and synthetic fiber for the stuffing. Often designed for children, some stuffed toys have become fads and collector's items.

In the late 19th century, Margarete Steiff and the Steiff company of Germany created the first stuffed animals. In 1902, a political cartoon of Theodore Roosevelt inspired the idea for "Teddy's bear". In 1903, Peter Rabbit was the first fictional character to be made into a patented stuffed toy. In 1921, A. A. Milne gave a stuffed bear to his son Christopher, which would inspire the creation of Winnie-the-Pooh. In the 1970s, London-based Hamleys toy store bought the rights to Paddington Bear stuffed toys. In the 1990s, Ty Warner created Beanie Babies, a series of animals stuffed with plastic pellets that were popular as collector's items. Beginning in the 1990s, electronic plush toys like Tickle Me Elmo and Furby became fads. Since 2005, beginning with Webkinz, toys-to-life stuffed toys have been sold where the toy is used to access digital content in video games and online worlds. In the 2020s, plush toys like Squishmallows, Jellycat and Labubu became fads after going viral on social media.

== Description ==
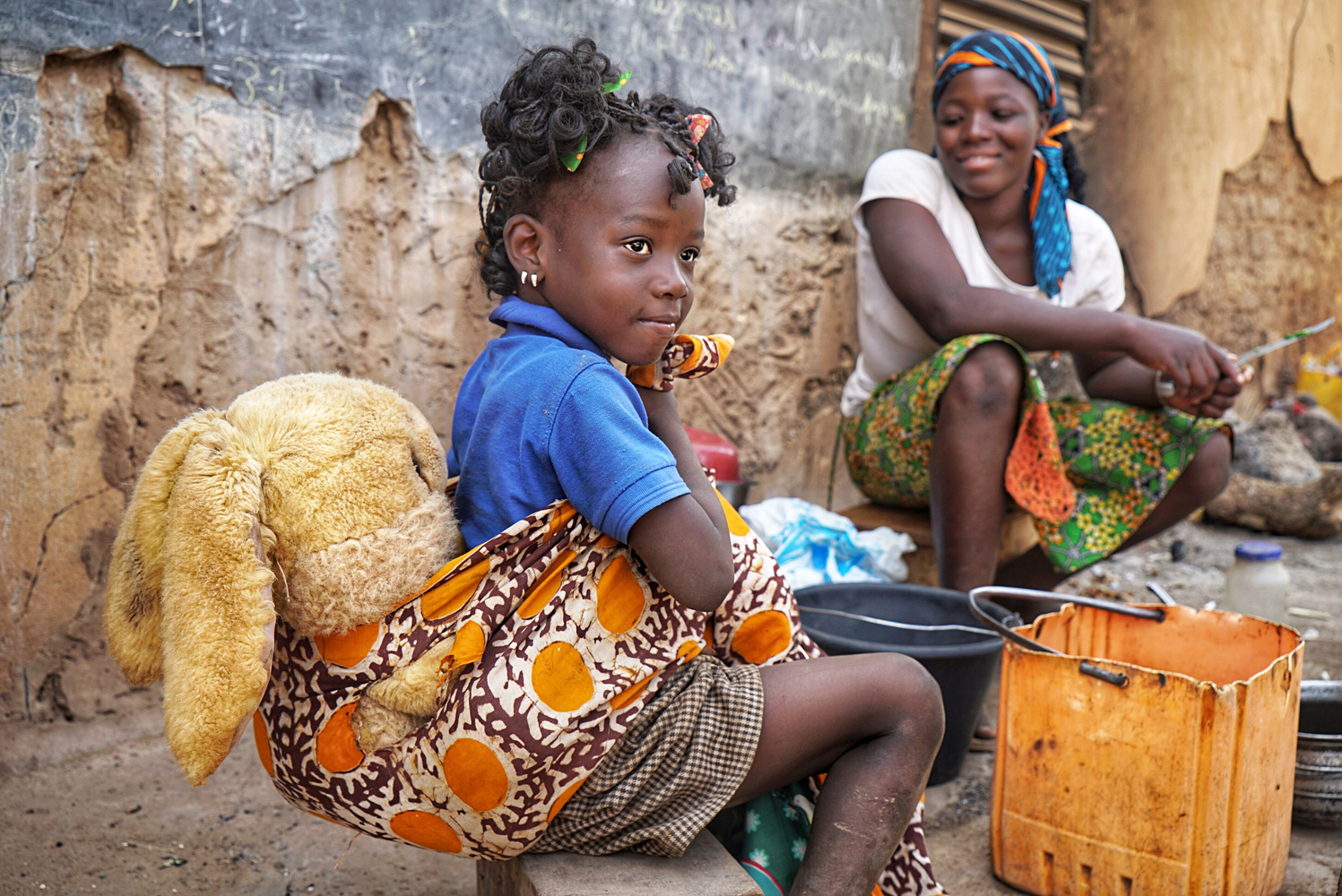
Stuffed toy rabbit in Burkina Faso

Stuffed toys are distinguishable from other toys mainly by their softness, flexibility, and resemblance to animals or fictional characters. Stuffed toys most commonly take the form of animals, especially bears (in the case of teddy bears), mammalian pets such as cats and dogs, and highly recognizable animals such as zebras, tigers, pandas, lizards, and elephants. Many fictional animal-like characters from movies, TV shows, books, or other entertainment forms often appear in stuffed toy versions, as do both real and fictional humans if the individual or character is famous enough. These toys are filled with soft stuffing material.

Stuffed toys come in an array of different sizes, with the smallest being thumb-sized and the largest being larger than a house. However, the largest commonly produced stuffed toys are not much bigger than a person. Most stuffed toys are designed to be an appropriate size for easy cuddling. They also come in a wide variety of colors, cloth surfaces, fur textures, and humanizing embellishments.

Stuffed toys are commonly sold in stores worldwide. Vendors are often abundant at tourist attractions, airports, carnivals, fairs, downtown parks, and general public meeting places of almost any nature, especially if there are children present.

== Production ==
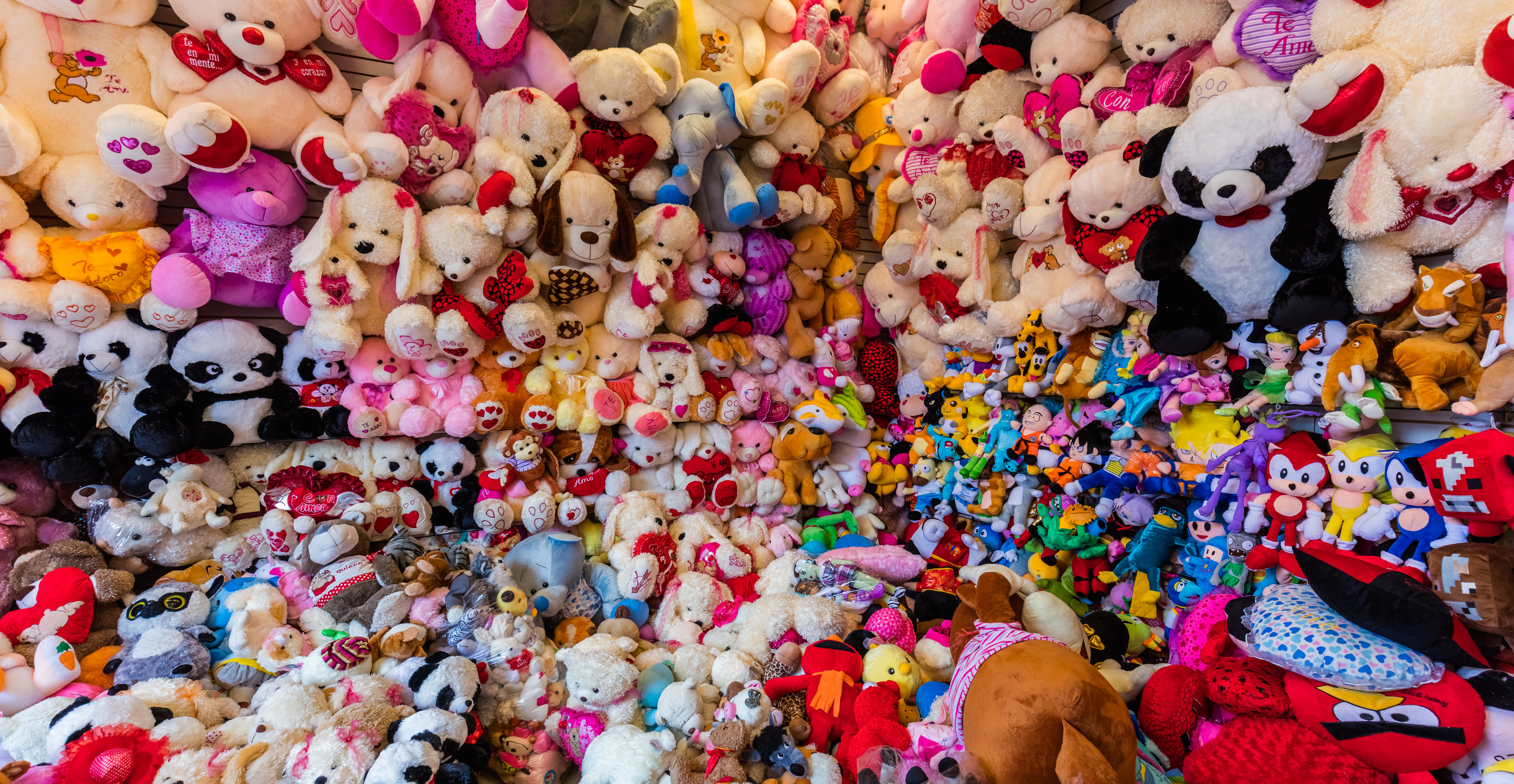
A teddies shop in Lima, Peru

Stuffed toys are made from a range of materials. The earliest were created from felt, velvet, or mohair and stuffed with straw, horsehair, or sawdust. Following World War II, manufacturers began to adopt more synthetic materials into production, and in 1954, the first teddy bear made from easily washable materials was produced. Modern stuffed toys are commonly constructed of outer fabrics such as plain cloth, pile textiles like plush or terrycloth, or sometimes socks. Common stuffing materials include synthetic fiber, batting, cotton, straw, wood wool, plastic pellets, and beans. Some modern toys incorporate electronics to move and interact with the user.

Manufacturers sell two main types of stuffed toys: licensed, which are toys of characters or other licensed properties, or basic, which take the shape of ordinary animals or other non-licensed subjects.

Stuffed toys can also be homemade from numerous types of fabric or yarn. For instance, amigurumi is a traditional Japanese type of knitted or crocheted stuffed toy typically made with an oversized head and undersized extremities to look kawaii ('cute').

=== Plush ===
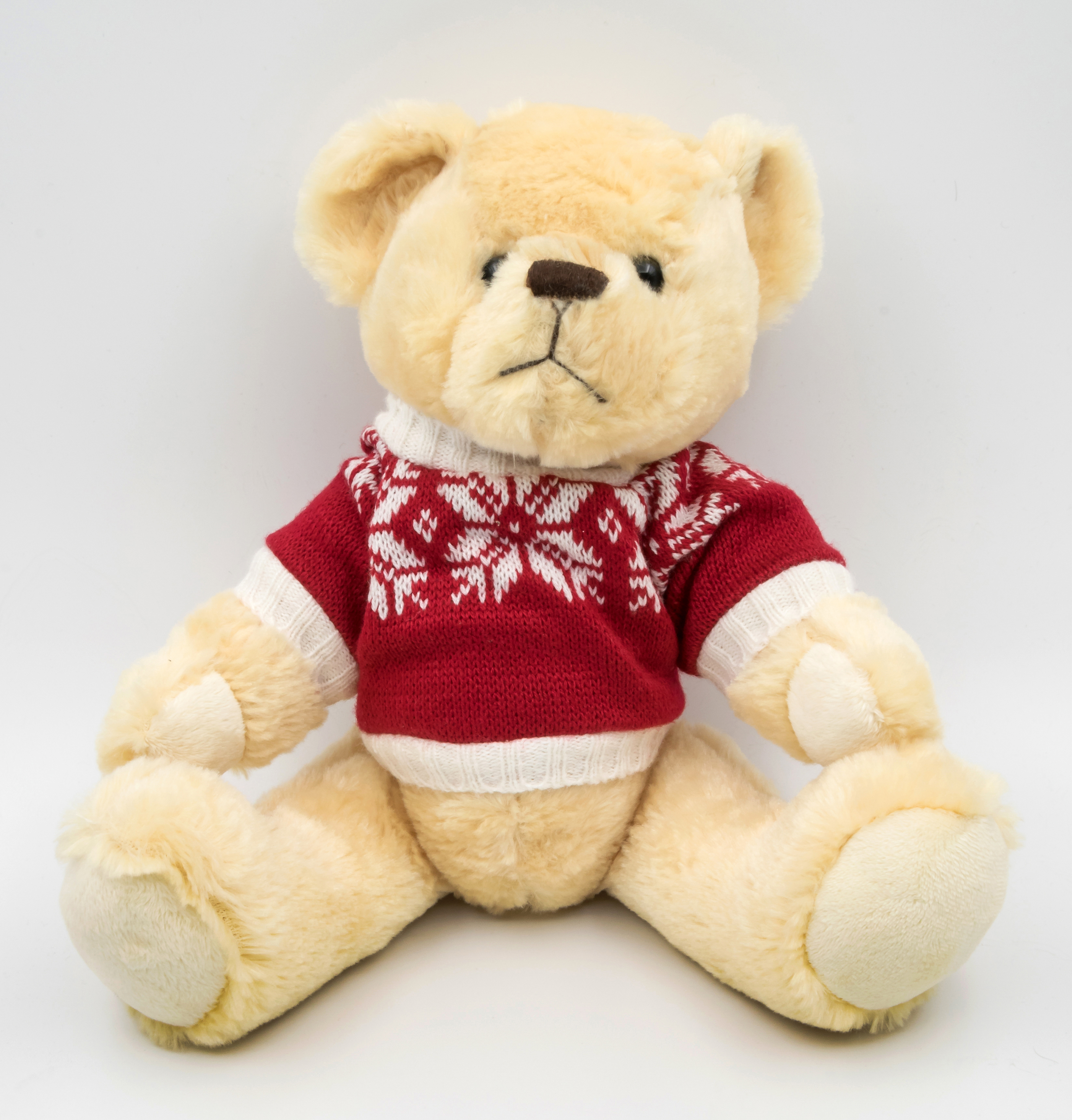
A plush bear

Plush (from French peluche) is a textile having a cut nap or pile the same as fustian or velvet. Its softness of feel gave rise to the adjective "plush" to describe something soft or luxurious, which was extended to describe luxury accommodation, or something rich and full.

Originally the pile of plush consisted of mohair or worsted yarn, but now silk by itself or with a cotton backing is used for plush, the distinction from velvet being found in the longer and less dense pile of plush. The soft material is largely used for upholstery and furniture purposes, and is also much employed in dress and millinery.

Modern plush are commonly manufactured from synthetic fibres such as polyester. One of the largest uses of this fabric is in the production of stuffed toys, with small plush toys made from plush fabric, such as teddy bears, to the point these are often addressed as "plush toys" or "plushies" in North American English. Plush is also one of the main materials for the construction of designer toys.

== Cultural impact, marketing, and collectors ==
Stuffed toys are among the most popular toys, especially for children. Their uses include imaginative play, comfort objects, display or collecting, and gifts to both children and adults for occasions such as graduation, illness, condolences, Valentine's Day, Christmas, or birthdays. In 2018, the global market for stuffed toys was estimated to be US$7.98 billion, with the growth in target consumers expected to drive sales upwards. Many stuffed toys have become fads that have boosted the industry overall.

Children, as well as adults, can use stuffed toys as comfort objects, forming emotional connections with them and often sleeping or cuddling with them for comfort. They can be sentimental objects that reduce anxiety around separation, self-esteem, and fear of the night. In 2019 about a third of British adults reported sleeping with soft toys, and almost half had kept their childhood toys.

In developmental psychology, stuffed toys are often described as transitional objects, helping some children negotiate the gradual shift from dependence on caregivers toward greater emotional independence.

== History ==
In 1878, The Delineator, an American magazine that offered sewing patterns, offered a "Pattern for an elephant and blanket" that was intended to be a child's toy.

Two years later, the first known commercially available stuffed felt elephant originally sold as a pincushion, was made by Margarete Steiff, founder of the German Steiff company in 1880, using the Delinator pattern. Steiff used newly developed technology for manufacturing upholstery to make its stuffed toys. In 1892, the Ithaca Kitty became one of the first mass-produced stuffed animal toys in the United States, which was sold as "The Tabby Cat" printed pattern on muslin by Arnold Print Works.

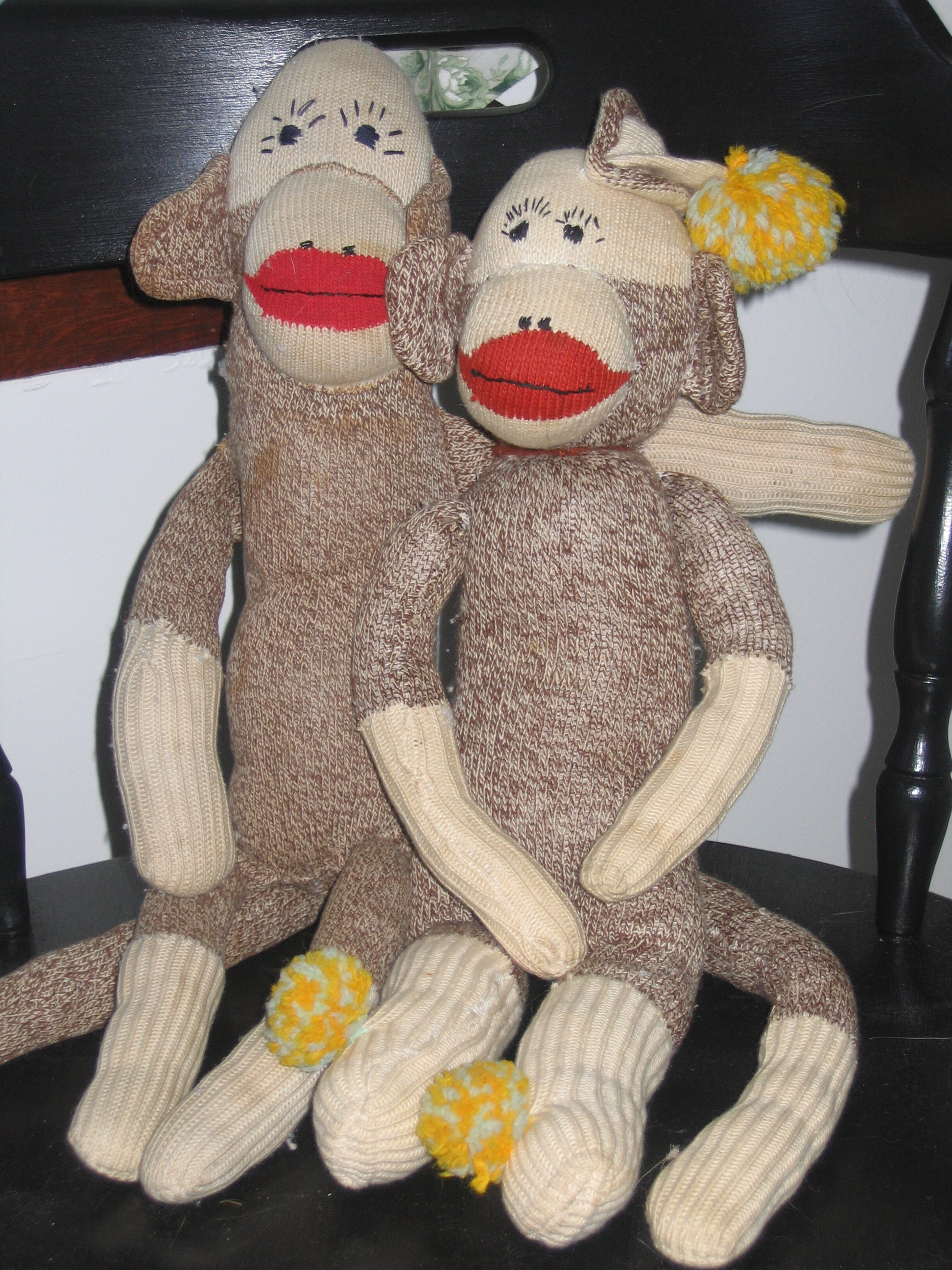
Homemade sock monkeys have been part of U.S. and Canadian culture since the Great Depression.

The toy industry significantly expanded in the early 20th century. In 1903, Richard Steiff, nephew of Margarete, designed a soft stuffed bear that differed from earlier traditional rag dolls because it was made of plush furlike fabric. As an art student in Stuttgart he visited the zoo and sketched the bears, which became the inspiration for his first life-like toy bear, known as "55 PB". At the same time, in the US, Morris Michtom created the first teddy bear after being inspired by a drawing of President "Teddy" Roosevelt with a bear cub. In 1903, the character Peter Rabbit from English author Beatrix Potter was the first fictional character to be made into a patented stuffed toy. The following year they went on sale and were mass produced by Steiff. The popularity of stuffed toys grew, with numerous manufacturers forming in Germany, the United Kingdom, and the United States. Many people also handmade their own stuffed toys. For instance, sock monkeys originated when parents turned old socks into toys during the Great Depression.

In 1921, A. A. Milne bought a stuffed toy from Harrods department store in London for his son Christopher Robin, a toy which would later inspire the author's creation of Winnie-the-Pooh. Stuffed toys of Paddington Bear, a character created by Michael Bond, were first produced by the family of Jeremy Clarkson in 1972, with the family eventually selling the rights to London-based Hamleys toy store.

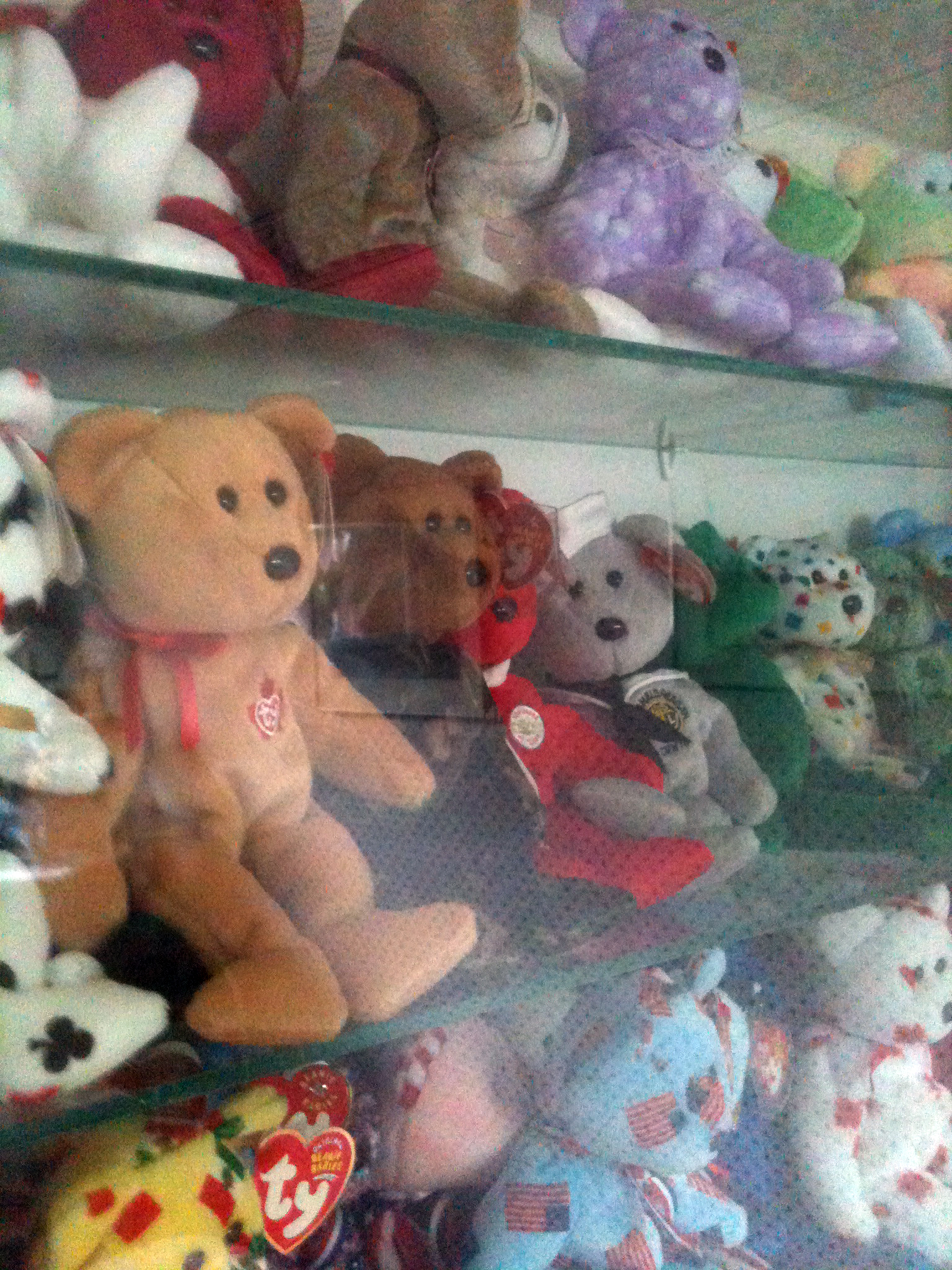
Some Beanie Babies on display by a collector

In the 1990s, Ty Warner created Beanie Babies, a series of animals stuffed with plastic pellets. The toys became a fad through marketing strategies that increased demand and encouraged collection.

Beginning in the 1990s, stuffed toys with electronics became fads. Tickle Me Elmo, a laughing and shaking plush toy based on the character Elmo from the Sesame Street television show, was released in 1996 and was soon in demand, with some people buying and reselling the toy for hundreds of dollars. This was followed by similar fads, including the robotic talking plush toy Furby released in 1998 and ZhuZhu Pets, a line of robotic plush hamsters released in 2009.

More recent lines of stuffed animals have been created around unique concepts, like Uglydoll, introduced in 2001, with a number of recognizable characters and overarching style. Pillow Pets, which can be folded from a pillow into a stuffed animal, were another successful brand, launching in 2003 and selling more than 30 million toys between 2010 and 2016.

Beginning in 2005 with Webkinz from Ganz, toys-to-life stuffed toys that unlock online content appeared on the market. Each Webkins toy came with a different "Secret Code" that gave access to the Webkinz World website and a virtual version of the toy for online play. They were followed by other stuffed toys with codes to unlock digital content in online worlds, such as Disney's Club Penguin and Build-A-Bearville from Build-A-Bear Workshop.

Modern plushies from Japan are known for kawaii styles, generally thought of as (at least globally) starting with Sanrio's Hello Kitty, with characters from media franchises like Pikachu and Eevee from Pokémon, and characters from stationery company San-X including Rilakkuma and the Sumikko Gurashi characters. There is also a trend of Japanese plushies being shaped like mochi. In 2013, Disney launched its first collection of Disney Tsum Tsum stuffed toys based on characters from different Disney properties. Inspired by the app of the same name, Tsum Tsums were first released in Japan (an example of mochi shaped plushies) before expanding to the United States.

Squishmallows became a fad after going viral on social media, in particular TikTok, during the COVID-19 pandemic in 2020–21. In the mid 2020s, stuffed toy keychains that could be used as fashion accessories, like Labubu and Jellycat, became fads after being worn by celebrities.

== See also ==
- Category:Stuffed toys
- List of stuffed toy manufacturers
- Toy safety
