= Bartlett High School (Tennessee) =

Public high school in Bartlett, Tennessee

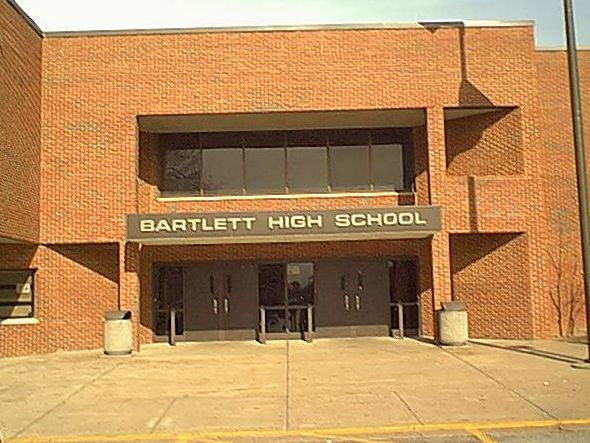

Location
- 5688 Woodlawn Street; Bartlett, Tennessee; 38134; United States

Information
- Former name: Nicholas Blackwell High School
- Type: High School
- Established: 1917
- School district: Bartlett City Schools
- Principal (Main Campus): Shannon Abraham
- Principal (Ninth Grade Academy): Kathryn McCain
- Staff: 156.00 (FTE)
- Grades: 9–12
- Enrollment: 2,863 (2023–2024)
- Student to teacher ratio: 18.35
- Colors: Red, white, and blue
- Athletics conference: TSSAA
- Team name: Panthers
- Rival: Arlington, Bolton, Christian Brothers, Collierville, Germantown, Houston
- Feeder schools: Appling Middle, Bon Lin Middle, Elmore Park Middle
- Website: https://bhs.bartlettschools.org

Bartlett High School is a high school (grades 9–12) located in Bartlett, Tennessee. It is part of the Bartlett City Schools. It was formerly operated by the Shelby County Schools system. Bartlett has two campuses, the main campus and the Ninth Grade Academy which is located at the former Shadowlawn Middle School campus on Shadowlawn Rd.

Founded as Nicholas Blackwell High School, Bartlett High School is the second largest high school in Tennessee, with a combined 9–12 student body of about 2,862 (2023–24).

== History ==
The school was built in 1917. It opened with 100 students and seven faculty members. The first principal was Dora Gholson.

All Bartlett public schools separated from Shelby County Schools to form a municipal school system in 2014.

The school underwent extensive renovations in 2021. This included the construction of the 2,500-seat McDonald Insurance Arena, a new main lobby and auditorium, connecting all buildings internally (including the old Bartlett Elementary campus), renovating classrooms, admin spaces, STEM, vocational, and athletic spaces. The cafeteria and library were also replaced. Students no longer have to go outside of the buildings to change classes, except for the enclosed courtyard area, thus improving security and student safety.

In 2021, an unknown individual posted a racist meme depicting monkeys in gold chains and Air Jordan shoes inside Bartlett High. However, the post used a renovation photo from the school website and could not be confirmed to be created by a student. The post was removed within 24 hours.

== Athletics ==
Sports and State Titles (runner-up)

- Baseball - 2007 (2006, 2008)
- Boys' Basketball - 2001, 2026
- Girls' Basketball - (1928, 2023, 2024, 2025)
- Boys' Bowling* - 2020, 2024, 2025 (2013, 2022)
- Girls' Bowling* - 2020 (2019, 2024)
- Cheerleading - 1986, 1988, 1990 (National Titles)
- Boys' Cross Country* - 2003 (2002, 2018, 2019, 2021)
- Girls' Cross Country* - (1999)
- Football
- Boys' Golf* - (1998)
- Girls' Golf* - 1991 (1992)
- Boys' & Girls' Lacrosse
- Boys' Soccer - (2025)
- Girls' Soccer
- Softball - (1987)
- Boys' & Girls' Swimming
- Boys' & Girls' Tennis
- Boys' Track & Field* - 1942, 1947, 1948, 1949, 1954, 1958, 1998, 2000, 2001, 2003, 2006, 2007, 2009, 2021, 2022, 2026
- Girls' Track & Field* - 1990, 1991, 1992, 2006, 2007, 2021, 2026 (2025)
- Unified Track & Field - 2022, 2023, 2024, 2025 (2019, 2021)
- Boys' & Girls' Trap
- Volleyball
- Boys' Wrestling
- Girls' Wrestling* - 2020, 2021, 2022, 2023 (2026)

*Includes team and/or individual championships

Facilities

- Bank of Bartlett Field (Football, Lacrosse, Track & Field)
- Ferguson Road Soccer Field* (Soccer)
- McDonald Insurance Arena (Basketball, Volleyball)
- Thomas J. Farley Gymnasium (Wrestling)
- W. J. Freeman Baseball Complex* (Baseball & Softball)

*Off Campus

== Notable alumni/faculty ==
- Heather Armstrong, blogger
- Jonathan Bowlan, professional baseball pitcher
- Ronald Davis, former NFL and CFL player
- Garrett Hines, American bobsledder & coach (2002 Olympic silver medalist)
- Justin Jefferson, college football linebacker for the Alabama Crimson Tide
- Eric McGill, professional basketball player
- Walter K. Singleton, Medal of Honor recipient
- Hubie Smith, retired boys' basketball coach
- Jacob Wilson, professional baseball player
- Daniel Wright, professional baseball pitcher
