= Lakeland School System =

Municipal school district in Tennessee, United States

Location
- 3009 Davies Plantation Rd., Lakeland, Tennessee, U.S. United States

District information
- Motto: Learn. Grow. Lead.
- Grades: K-12
- Established: December 2013
- Superintendent: Dr. Ted Horrell
- Schools: Lakeland Elementary School; Lakeland Middle Preparatory School; Lakeland Preparatory School (9-12)

Other information
- Website: lakelandk12.org

The Lakeland School System (LSS) is a municipal school district serving the city of Lakeland, Tennessee, United States, within Greater Memphis. Lakeland Elementary School and Lakeland Preparatory School are within the district.

In December 2013 the district selected as its superintendent Dr. Ted Horrell, the principal of Germantown High School, and a former principal of Millington Central High School.

As of January 2014 the school district established a survey on Surveymonkey to gauge parental attitudes on several issues. As of that year, the residents are served by Shelby County Schools with elementary students attending Lakeland Elementary School and more than 1,200 students from Lakeland in higher grades attending campuses in Arlington and Bartlett.

== Attempted Bolton Annexation ==
In early 2014, some residents of the Bolton community sought annexation with Lakeland, partly so the unincorporated area could join a municipal school district. Bolton includes Barret's Chapel Elementary School and Bolton High School. The vote for annexation went before the Lakeland City Board on June 12, 2014 and failed. One resident of the community told the Board that "10 times more residents have petitioned you not to annex than have petitioned you to annex."

== Schools ==
Lakeland Elementary, 20-acre (8.1 ha), opened in 2001 as a school within Shelby County Schools, with its founding principal Mrs. Nancy Rouse. It has a capacity of 1,000 students. The school has grades K-4 attending the school currently, with its current principal Ms. Joretha Lockhart. The school used to have fifth-grade classes attending the school, but that changed in 2017 due to the opening of Lakeland Preparatory School.

Lakeland Preparatory School (formerly known as "Lakeland Middle Preparatory School"), 20-acre (8.1 ha), opened in the Fall of 2017 under the leadership of its first principal, Mr. Matt Adler. The campus is split into 2 schools, Lakeland Middle Preparatory School under principal Corrie Martin serving grades 5-8, and Lakeland Preparatory school, the high school section serving grades 9-12. Lakeland Preparatory School is under the direction of principal Blake Waddell.

== Expansion ==
In late 2021, Lakeland Prep expanded to include a high school in the city. Before that, all high school students attended Arlington High School in Arlington, TN. The expansion brought four additional grades, a new gym, fine arts facilities, and a large auditorium for school plays. The new classrooms were seamlessly integrated, making them feel like they had always been part of the school. The campus also gained its own football stadium, softball and baseball fields, and a marching band practice field for the Lakeland Marching Band.
