= Lakeland, Tennessee =

- City
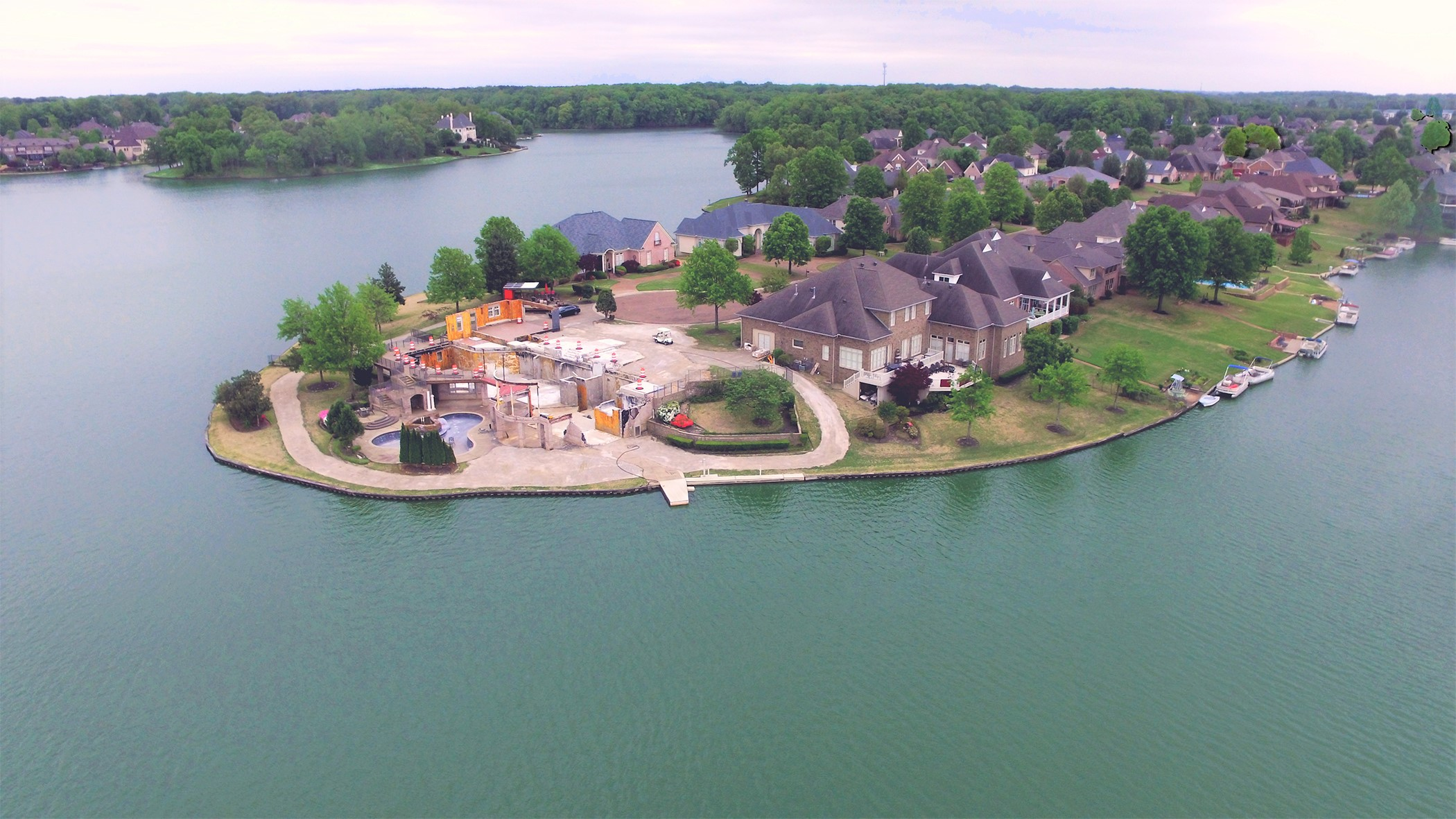
- Houses on Lake Garner in Lakeland, Tennessee

- Flag Seal Logo

- Location of Lakeland in Shelby County, Tennessee.
- Coordinates: 35°13′50″N 89°44′25″W
- Country: United States
- State: Tennessee
- County: Shelby

Government
  - Mayor: Josh Roman

Area
  - Total: 23.87 sq mi (61.83 km^{2})
  - Land: 23.46 sq mi (60.75 km^{2})
  - Water: 0.42 sq mi (1.08 km^{2})
- Elevation: 397 ft (121 m)

Population (2020)
  - Total: 13,904
  - Density: 592.8/sq mi (228.87/km^{2})
- Time zone: UTC-6 (Central (CST))
  - Summer (DST): UTC-5 (CDT)
- ZIP code: 38002
- Area code: 901
- FIPS code: 47-40350
- GNIS feature ID: 1313627
- Website: www.lakelandtn.gov

Lakeland is a city in Shelby County, Tennessee, United States, and a part of the Memphis metropolitan area. As of the 2020 census, Lakeland had a population of 13,904.

== History ==
The city was the location of the now defunct Lakeland Amusement Park. The Lakeland Factory Outlet Mall closed around 2011 and the property was subsequently targeted for redevelopment. The city was originally themed around the Lake now called Garner Lake. It had two railroads within the park property, including the 3 ft (914 mm) narrow-gauge Huff 'n' Puff Railroad and a separate 16 in (406 mm) miniature railway railroad made by the Allan Herschell Company.

=== First Amendment Lawsuit ===
In June 2024, Lakeland resident and US Navy veteran Julie Pereira sued the city of Lakeland for violating her First Amendment rights when it fined Pereira hundreds of dollars for violating the city's regulation against obscene content on signs, after she displayed a political sign in her yard that read 'Fuck Em' Both 2024', referring to 2024 US presidential election candidates Joe Biden and Donald Trump. In July 2024, US District Judge Mark Norris ruled that Pereira's sign was not obscene and that it was unconstitutional for the city to regulate political points of view, citing as precedent the 1971 decision by the US Supreme Court in the case of Cohen v. California, and ordered the city to reimburse Pereira nearly $700 in fines and to pay her $31,000 in legal fees and $1 in damages.

== Geography ==
Lakeland is located at 35°13′50″N 89°44′25″W. According to the United States Census Bureau, the city has a total area of 18.0 square miles (47 km^{2}), of which 17.6 square miles (46 km^{2}) is land and 0.4 square miles (1.0 km^{2}) (2.33%) is water.

== Demographics ==
Historical population
Census	Pop.	Note	%±
1980	612		—
1990	1,204		96.7%
2000	6,862		469.9%
2010	12,430		81.1%
2020	13,904		11.9%
2025 (est.)	14,422	▲	3.7%

=== 2020 census ===
As of the 2020 census, Lakeland had a population of 13,904. The median age was 40.2 years. 26.7% of residents were under the age of 18 and 14.9% of residents were 65 years of age or older. For every 100 females there were 97.8 males, and for every 100 females age 18 and over there were 93.9 males age 18 and over.

82.6% of residents lived in urban areas, while 17.4% lived in rural areas.

There were 4,904 households in Lakeland, of which 41.1% had children under the age of 18 living in them. Of all households, 65.5% were married-couple households, 11.5% were households with a male householder and no spouse or partner present, and 19.3% were households with a female householder and no spouse or partner present. About 17.4% of all households were made up of individuals and 8.3% had someone living alone who was 65 years of age or older.

There were 5,054 housing units, of which 3.0% were vacant. The homeowner vacancy rate was 0.8% and the rental vacancy rate was 6.6%.

Racial composition as of the 2020 census
Race	Number	Percent
White	10,306	74.1%
Black or African American	1,384	10.0%
American Indian and Alaska Native	34	0.2%
Asian	774	5.6%
Native Hawaiian and Other Pacific Islander	4	0.0%
Some other race	384	2.8%
Two or more races	1,018	7.3%
Hispanic or Latino (of any race)	976	7.0%

=== 2010 census ===
As of the 2010 census, there were 12,430 people living in Lakeland.

=== 2000 census ===
At the 2000 census there were 6,862 people, 2,748 households, and 2,025 families living in the city. The population density was 389.5 inhabitants per square mile (150.4/km^{2}). There were 2,904 housing units at an average density of 164.8 units per square mile (63.6 units/km^{2}). The racial makeup of the city was 91.56% White, 5.22% African American, 0.13% Native American, 1.78% Asian, 0.50% from other races, and 0.82% from two or more races. Hispanic or Latino of any race were 1.47%.

Of the 2,748 households 34.0% had children under the age of 18 living with them, 63.9% were married couples living together, 7.3% had a female householder with no husband present, and 26.3% were non-families. 22.0% of households were one person and 4.5% had someone living alone who was 65 years of age or older. The average household size was 2.50 and the average family size was 2.94.

The age distribution was 24.6% under the age of 18, 6.4% from 18 to 24, 37.2% from 25 to 44, 23.8% from 45 to 64, and 7.9% who were 65 years of age or older. The median age was 35 years. For every 100 females there were 95.1 males. For every 100 females age 18 and over, there were 94.5 males.

The median household income was $58,897 and the median family income was $64,444. Males had a median income of $46,750 versus $32,366 for females. The per capita income for the city was $28,956. About 2.2% of families and 3.0% of the population were below the poverty line, including 4.4% of those under age 18 and 2.8% of those age 65 or over.

== Education ==
Lakeland is served by the Lakeland School System (LSS) and Arlington Community Schools.

Assigned schools are as follows:

Lakeland Elementary School (Grades K-4)

Lakeland Preparatory School (Grades 5–12)

Arlington High School (Grades 9–12)
