= Arlington Community Schools =

School district in Tennessee, US

Location
- Arlington, Tennessee United States

District information
- Type: Public School District
- Motto: “Empowered and Inspired Today...Leading Our Community Tomorrow”
- Grades: K-12
- Superintendent: Allison Clark
- Schools: Arlington Elementary School; Donelson Elementary School; Arlington Middle School; Arlington High School

Students and staff
- Students: ~4969

Arlington Community Schools is the municipal school district in Arlington, Tennessee in Greater Memphis.

== History ==
After Memphis City Schools and Shelby County Schools were merged in March 2011 (effective beginning 2013–2014 school year), several local municipalities attempted to create their own districts. After a protracted legal battle, several municipalities won the right to create their own school districts.

Arlington Community Schools provides K-12 education for students residing within the municipal boundaries of the Town of Arlington. Through an Interlocal Agreement between Arlington Community Schools and Lakeland School System, high (9-12) school students in the neighboring municipality of Lakeland attend Arlington High School.

In December 2013, the district selected as its superintendent Tammy Mason, the former principal of Arlington High School.

== Schools ==
=== Elementary schools ===
- Arlington Elementary School
- Donelson Elementary School

=== Middle schools ===
- Arlington Middle School

=== High schools ===
- Arlington High School
