= Hubie Smith =

American basketball coach

Arthur Hubert Smith (born c. 1961) is a basketball coach in Tennessee. He has coached at three colleges as well as boys and girls at three high schools, winning seven state championships: two with girls and 5 with boys.

== Player ==
Smith played high school basketball for Harding Academy in Memphis from 1976 to 1979. He ranks 4th all time in the state of Tennessee for career free throw percentage at 86.3%. Smith played both college basketball and golf at Harding University in Searcy, Arkansas. In 2006 he was named to the Harding Hall of Fame. He was first team AIC in basketball, the school recordholder in assists, both overall (544) and season average (7.0, 1981).

== Coaching career ==
Smith worked as a graduate assistant coach at Memphis State University in the 1983–1984 season for coach Dana Kirk. Smith then coached boys at Bartlett High School in Bartlett, Tennessee for 19 years, where his teams posted a 440–190 record and won the class AAA state championship in 2001. He then moved to Nashville, Tennessee, taking the job of Director of Basketball Operations at Belmont University in November 2003. From 2004 to 2008 he was an assistant coach at Lipscomb University. In 2008 he took the position coaching the girls basketball team at Ensworth School. In five years at Ensworth, the teams won two state championships and finished as runners-up twice. In 2013 he took the boys coaching job at Brentwood Academy, where his teams won the state championship in 2015, 2016, 2017, and 2018. In 2019 he was named to the TSSAA Hall of fame. Smith became only the third coach in TSSAA history to win four consecutive state titles. In 2017 he was named Tennessee high school basketball coach of the year by USA Today. In 2018 he was named 2018 boys basketball coach of the year by the Tennessean.

== Other ==
Smith serves on the board of trustees for Harding Academy.

Smith coached Darius Garland during his tenure at Brentwood Academy.
