= Hunter Goodman =

American baseball player (born 1999)

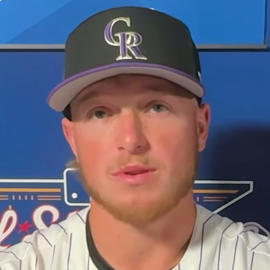
- Goodman with the Colorado Rockies in 2025

Colorado Rockies – No. 15
- Catcher
- Born: October 8, 1999 (age 26); Arlington, Tennessee, U.S.
- Bats: Right Throws: Right

MLB debut
- August 27, 2023, for the Colorado Rockies

MLB statistics (through 2026 season)
- Batting average: .247
- Home runs: 86
- Runs batted in: 232
- Stats at Baseball Reference

Teams
- Colorado Rockies (2023–present)

Career highlights and awards
- 2× All-Star (2025, 2026); Silver Slugger Award (2025)

Hunter Robert Goodman (born October 8, 1999) is an American professional baseball catcher for the Colorado Rockies of Major League Baseball (MLB). He made his MLB debut in 2023. Goodman is a two-time All-Star and a Silver Slugger Award winner in 2025.

== Amateur career ==
Goodman attended Arlington High School in Arlington, Tennessee and the University of Memphis, where he played college baseball for the Memphis Tigers for three seasons. He batted .326/.367/.573 with 16 doubles, 13 home runs, and 67 runs batted in (RBI) as a freshman and was named the American Athletic Conference (AAC) Newcomer of the Year.

After the 2019 season, Goodman played collegiate summer baseball for the Hyannis Harbor Hawks of the Cape Cod Baseball League, batted .276/.291/.494, and was named a league all-star.

He was slashing .357/.416/.743 as a sophomore before the season was cut short due to the coronavirus pandemic. Goodman slashed .307/.401/.678 with a school-record 21 home runs in 2021.

== Professional career ==
The Colorado Rockies selected Goodman in the fourth round of the 2021 Major League Baseball (MLB) draft. He received a $600,000 signing bonus. In 2021 with the Arizona Complex League Rockies, he slashed .300/.419/.517.

Goodman began the 2022 season with the Fresno Grizzlies of the Single-A California League. He played in 73 games while with the Grizzlies, slashing .291/.368/.592 with 22 home runs. On July 6, he was promoted to the Spokane Indians. While with the Indians, Goodman played in 50 games, where he slashed .315/.351/.589 with 12 home runs. He was promoted to the Double-A Hartford Yard Goats on September 7. In 12 games with the Yard Goats, Goodman hit two home runs, slashing .227/.277/.364. He was named the Rockies minor league player of the year and a California League postseason All-Star.

Goodman returned to Hartford to start the 2023 season, playing in 91 games and batting .239/.325/.523 with 25 home runs and 78 RBI. He was then promoted to the Triple-A Albuquerque Isotopes, where he hit .371/.418/.903 with nine home runs and 33 RBIs across 15 games.

On August 27, Goodman was selected to the Rockies 40-man roster and promoted to the major leagues. At the time of his promotion, he led the minors with 34 home runs. In his MLB debut that afternoon, he singled twice in four at bats as the Rockies went on to win 4–3 win over the Baltimore Orioles at Camden Yards. He drove in a run with his first hit off Jack Flaherty in the sixth inning and eventually scored the deciding run in the ninth after a leadoff infield single off Yennier Canó with the score tied at 3–3. In 23 games for Colorado, he batted .200/.247/.386 with one home run and 17 RBI.

Goodman was optioned to Triple-A to begin the 2024 season. He was promoted to the Rockies in April and stayed with the organization until April 18 when he was sent back to the Isotopes for two weeks before finishing the season with the Rockies. On June 15, Goodman went 4-for-5 with two home runs and five RBI in a 16-4 win against the Pittsburgh Pirates. He finished his rookie season as the Rockies backup catcher with a slash line of .190/.228/.417, including 13 home runs.

In 2025, Goodman began the season as the Rockies starting catcher and appeared in 144 games. He was the team’s most valuable player, slashing .278/.323/.520 (120 OPS+). He hit 31 home runs, the first Rockies hitter to do so since 2019, and had one of the best seasons by a catcher in franchise history. Also in 2025, Goodman became a first-time National League (NL) All-Star and won the Silver Slugger Award for catcher in the NL.

On June 27, 2026, Goodman hit three home runs during an 8–5 victory over the Minnesota Twins; his first two homers were solo shots off of Mike Paredes, with his third being a three–run shot off of Kody Funderburk. On July 19, Goodman hit three home runs during a 6–9 loss to the Cincinnati Reds, become the first player in Rockies history to have two three–home run games in a season.

== Personal life ==
Goodman is married.

In high school, Goodman also played wide receiver and punter for his school's football team.
