= Ron Davis (defensive back) =

American gridiron football player (born 1972)

No. 28, 18
- Position: Cornerback

Personal information
- Born: February 24, 1972 (age 54); Bartlett, Tennessee, U.S.
- Listed height: 5 ft 10 in (1.78 m)
- Listed weight: 190 lb (86 kg)

Career information
- High school: Bartlett
- College: Tennessee
- NFL draft: 1995: 2nd round, 41st overall pick

Career history
- Atlanta Falcons (1995); Green Bay Packers (1996–1997); BC Lions (1999)

Career NFL statistics
- Tackles: 27
- Fumble recoveries: 1
- Stats at Pro Football Reference

Ronald Rozelle Davis (born February 24, 1972) is an American former professional football player who was a cornerback for the Atlanta Falcons and the Green Bay Packers. Coming off a college football career with the Tennessee Volunteers, Davis possessed excellent 4.45 speed, coverage skills and size for his position. He was selected by the Falcons in the second round of the 1995 NFL draft with the 41st overall pick. He started in five games for the Falcons, although he struggled making the transition to the NFL. After failing multiple NFL and Tennessee drug tests, he was released from the Falcons. Davis was later picked up by the Packers, who overlooked his substance abuse problems for his pure talent. Still, Davis was unable to find success and was not resigned once his rookie contract expired. He attempted a comeback with the CFL's BC Lions in 1999, but lasted three games.

Pre-draft measurables
Height	Weight	Arm length	Hand span	40-yard dash	10-yard split	20-yard split	20-yard shuttle	Vertical jump
5 ft 10 in (1.78 m)	200 lb (91 kg)	31 1/2 in (0.80 m)	9 1/2 in (0.24 m)	4.57 s	1.61 s	2.64 s	4.00 s	38.0 in (0.97 m)
All values from NFL Combine
