= Jacob Wilson (utility player) =

American baseball player (born 1990)

- Infielder / Outfielder
- Born: July 29, 1990 (age 35); Bartlett, Tennessee, U.S.
- Batted: Right Threw: Right

Professional debut
- KBO: June 19, 2019, for the Lotte Giants
- MLB: July 10, 2021, for the Oakland Athletics

Last appearance
- KBO: September 26, 2019, for the Lotte Giants
- MLB: August 22, 2021, for the Houston Astros

KBO statistics
- Batting average: .251
- Home runs: 9
- Runs batted in: 37

MLB statistics
- Batting average: .150
- Home runs: 0
- Runs batted in: 1

Teams
- Lotte Giants (2019); Oakland Athletics (2021); Houston Astros (2021)
Medals
Men's baseball
Representing United States
Pan American Games
Silver medal – second place	2015 Toronto	Team

Jacob Clinton Wilson (born July 29, 1990) is an American former professional baseball utility player. He played in Major League Baseball (MLB) for the Oakland Athletics and Houston Astros, and in the KBO League for the Lotte Giants.

== Early life and education ==
Born in Bartlett, Tennessee, Wilson graduated from Bartlett High School

Wilson played college baseball at the University of Memphis for the Tigers from 2009 to 2012. As a senior, he was the Conference USA Player of the Year after hitting .320 with 17 home runs and a 1.009 OPS.

== Career ==
=== St. Louis Cardinals ===
Wilson was drafted by the St. Louis Cardinals in the 10th round of the 2012 Major League Baseball (MLB) draft. He signed with the Cardinals and made his professional debut with the Low-A Batavia Muckdogs, and hit .275 with 6 home runs and 25 RBI. In 2013, he played for the Single-A Peoria Chiefs and High-A Palm Beach Cardinals, slashing .243/.336/.424 with 18 home runs and 82 RBI.

In 2014, Wilson started with Palm Beach before being promoted to the Double-A Springfield Cardinals. He hit .302 with 5 home runs and 41 RBI before his season came to an end after 66 games due to a knee injury. Wilson split the 2015 season between Springfield and the Triple-A Memphis Redbirds, slashing .230/.302/.407 with 18 home runs and 77 RBI. During the 2016 season, he split time between Memphis and Springfield, finishing the year batting .223 with 14 home runs. In 2017, Wilson played for Springfield, posting a .248 batting average with 17 home runs and 66 RBI in 129 games for Springfield.

=== Washington Nationals ===
On December 14, 2017, the Washington Nationals selected Wilson with one of their two picks in the minor league phase of the Rule 5 draft.

In 2018, Wilson retooled his swing over the off-season and emerged as a more successful hitter, quickly progressing in the Nationals organization from the Double–A Harrisburg Senators to the Triple–A Syracuse Chiefs while playing multiple infield and outfield positions. With a batting average above the .300 mark near the International League season's midway point, Wilson was named to represent the Chiefs in the 2018 Triple–A All-Star Game. He finished the season with a .278/.347/.408 slash line with 7 home runs and 55 RBI in 108 games between the two levels, as well as four rehab games with the rookie–level Gulf Coast League Nationals.

Wilson was invited to participate in major league spring training before the 2019 season with the Nationals. Wilson began the year with the Triple–A Fresno Grizzlies, and hit .313 with 15 home runs and 48 RBI across 54 games before he left the team on June 9.

=== Lotte Giants ===
On June 10, 2019, Wilson officially signed with the Lotte Giants of the KBO League on a one-year, $400,000 deal. In 68 games for Lotte, Wilson batted .251/.351/.433 with 9 home runs and 37 RBI. He became a free agent following the 2019 season.

=== Washington Nationals (second stint) ===
On February 12, 2020, Wilson signed a minor league contract to return to the Washington Nationals organization. However, Wilson did not play in a game in 2020 due to the cancellation of the minor league season because of the COVID-19 pandemic. He became a free agent on November 2.

=== Oakland Athletics ===
On November 12, 2020, Wilson signed a minor league contract with the Oakland Athletics organization. He was assigned to the Triple-A Las Vegas Aviators to begin the 2021 season, and hit .288/.385/.630 with 14 home runs and 46 RBI in 49 games. On July 8, 2021, Wilson was selected to the 40-man roster and promoted to the major leagues for the first time. Wilson made his MLB debut on July 10, replacing Tony Kemp at second base in the 10th inning and popping out in his only at-bat. He recorded his first career hit on July 20, a single off of José Suárez in a 6–0 win over the Los Angeles Angels. In 7 at-bats for the A's, Wilson hit .143. On July 31, Wilson was designated for assignment by the A's.

=== Houston Astros ===
On August 2, 2021, Wilson was claimed off of waivers by the Houston Astros. He was optioned to the Triple–A Sugar Land Skeeters. Wilson appeared in six games for the Astros, going 2–for–13 (.154) before he was outrighted off of the 40–man roster on September 13. Wilson elected free agency free agency following the season on November 7.

== See also ==
- Rule 5 draft results
