= Jake Golday =

American football player (born 2003)

No. 41 – Minnesota Vikings
- Position: Linebacker
- Roster status: Active

Personal information
- Born: May 23, 2003 (age 23); Arlington, Tennessee, U.S.
- Listed height: 6 ft 4 in (1.93 m)
- Listed weight: 240 lb (109 kg)

Career information
- High school: Arlington
- College: Central Arkansas (2021–2023); Cincinnati (2024–2025)
- NFL draft: 2026: 2nd round, 51st overall pick

Career history
- Minnesota Vikings (2026–present)

Awards and highlights
- First-team All-Big 12 (2025)

Career NFL statistics as of Week 10, 2026
- Tackles: 14
- Forced fumbles: 1
- Fumble recoveries: 1
- Stats at Pro Football Reference

Jake Golday (born May 23, 2003) is an American professional football linebacker for the Minnesota Vikings of the National Football League (NFL). He played college football for the Central Arkansas Bears and Cincinnati Bearcats and was selected by the Vikings in the second round of the 2026 NFL draft.

== Early life ==
Golday attended Arlington High School in Arlington, Tennessee. He committed to Central Arkansas University to play college football.

== College career ==
Golday played three years at Central Arkansas from 2021 to 2023. In 2023, he had 84 tackles and 4.5 sacks. Golday transferred to the University of Cincinnati after the season. In his first season with Cincinnati in 2024, he started eight of 12 games, recording 58 tackles and 1.5 sacks. He returned to Cincinnati in 2025 as a starter. In the 2025 season, he led the team with 105 tackles in addition to 3.5 sacks.

== Professional career ==
Pre-draft measurables
Height	Weight	Arm length	Hand span	Wingspan	40-yard dash	10-yard split	20-yard split	20-yard shuttle	Three-cone drill	Vertical jump	Broad jump	Bench press
6 ft 4 1/2 in (1.94 m)	239 lb (108 kg)	31 7/8 in (0.81 m)	9 1/2 in (0.24 m)	6 ft 4 7/8 in (1.95 m)	4.62 s	1.60 s	2.66 s	4.32 s	6.89 s	39.0 in (0.99 m)	10 ft 5 in (3.18 m)	22 reps
All values from NFL Combine/Pro Day

Golday was selected by the Minnesota Vikings in the second round with the 51st overall pick of the 2026 NFL draft.
