= HFH =

HFH can be:

- Habitat for Hope, an American children's health-related organization
- Habitat for Humanity, a Christian development charity
- Hemifacial hypertrophy
- Henry Ford Hospital, in Detroit, Michigan, United States
- Hôpital Français de Hanoi, in Vietnam
