= Bolton High School (Tennessee) =

Location
- 7323 Brunswick Road; Arlington, Tennessee 38002; United States; 35°19′34″N 89°45′39″W

Information
- Type: Public
- Established: 1887
- School district: Memphis-Shelby County Schools
- Principal: Gavin Adkins
- Faculty: 105
- Teaching staff: 42.07 (FTE)
- Enrollment: 678 (2023-2024)
- Student to teacher ratio: 16.12
- Color
- Nickname: Wildcats
- Athletics: 16 varsity teams
- Website: School website

Bolton High School is a public high school (grades 9–12) located in unincorporated Shelby County, Tennessee, United States, that is a part of the Memphis-Shelby County Schools district. Bolton High School is located northwest of the town of Arlington. The student body makeup is 50 percent male and 50 percent female, and the total minority enrollment is 86 percent.

== History ==
The current Bolton High School campus exists on the former Hoboken Plantation, owned by Wade H. Bolton. Bolton, who earned much of his fortune as an owner of Bolton, Dickens & Co., one of the largest slave trading firms in the South, set aside 1,200 acres (5 km^{2}) for the founding of an agricultural college prior to his murder in 1869. Today, BHS serves around 700 students from all over Shelby County, and even from outside the county.

== Curriculum and activities ==
At Bolton High School, there is a wide variety of classes, athletics, extracurricular clubs, and other programs to be involved in. Bolton is one of only a few schools in the area with multiple vocational classes, as well as several different types of advanced classes. Bolton offers over fifty different extracurricular activities, including sports, musical programs, volunteer clubs, and more.

=== Academics ===
At Bolton High School, students have the opportunity to take Advanced Placement coursework and exams, including subjects such as English, math, and history, which can give a student college credit, depending on the score of the final exam in the class. The AP participation rate at Bolton High School is around nineteen percent. Dual Enrollment classes, which can give students college credit through maintaining a passing grade (final exam does not affect college credit), are also offered. However, there are currently only English and math Dual Enrollment classes. Bolton also offers a number of honors classes.

Bolton High School has become an International Baccalaureate (IB) World School. The IB program began in the fall of 2011. Participating students from the Class of 2013 were the first in Bolton history to graduate with an International Baccalaureate Diploma. Bolton High School is one of two Shelby County Schools to be accepted as an International Baccalaureate school. In October 2013, members of the IB program organized a program called Links of Luv, which was a fundraiser for Habitat for Hope. Links of Luv was a competitive fundraiser between Bolton High School and Arlington High School (Arlington, Tennessee) to see who could raise the most money. During the Bolton/Arlington football game, students from both schools held paper chain links to display how much money each school raised. Bolton won with $7,250.85. Both schools together raised nearly eleven thousand dollars for Habitat for Hope.

=== Athletics ===
Bolton has sixteen sports teams, including basketball, golf, football, tennis, ultimate frisbee, cheer, baseball, softball, bowling, soccer, swimming, trap, volleyball, wrestling, cross country, and track and field. Bolton won six state championships in boys basketball in the years 1975, 1978, 1979, 1981, 1985, and 1989. Within recent years, Bolton High School has won a number of awards in a variety of sports, including track and field, cross country, tennis, basketball, and golf.

== Notable alumni ==
- Sylvester Gray (1986), NBA player
- Latasha Byears (1992), WNBA player, 2x WNBA champion with the Los Angeles Sparks
