= Cody Fowler House =

Historic home in Florida, U.S.

Coordinates: 28.040949°N 82.380155°W

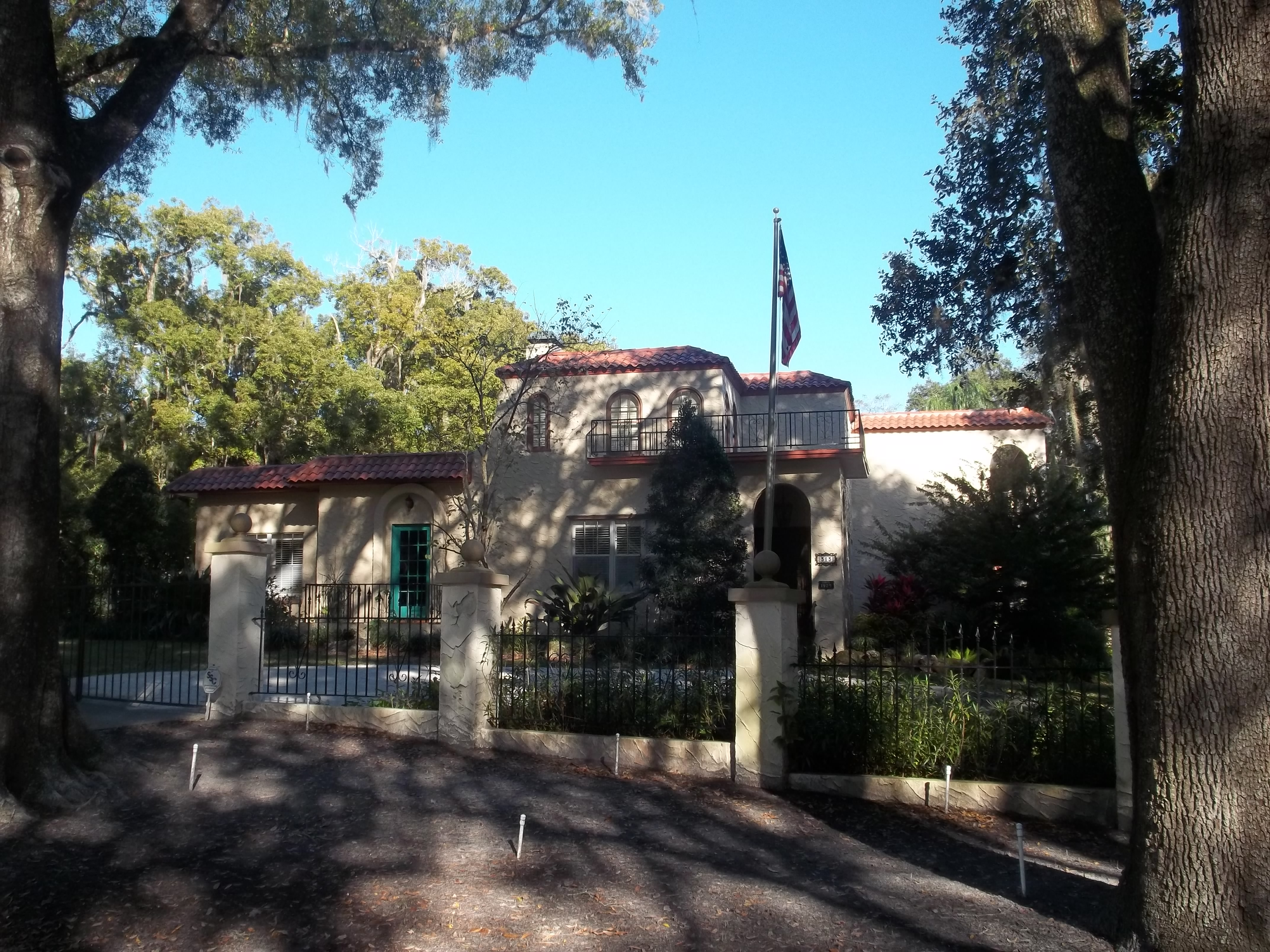

Cody Fowler House is a historic home built in Temple Terrace, Florida, in 1922. It was designed by M. Leo Elliott. The house is located at 313 Sleepy Hollow Avenue.

The Fowler House is one of eight original Mediterranean Revival style homes designed for the developers of Temple Terrace by Elliott. It was built for Cody Fowler, an attorney and former president of the American Bar Association whose mother, Maude Cody Fowler, was one of the founders of Temple Terrace and a Vice-Mayor. Tampa's Fowler Avenue, one of the main thorough fares of Temple Terrace, is named after Maude for her contributions to the development and establishment of Temple Terrace as a prominent community of the Tampa Bay Area.
