= Nicholas Gotten House =

Historic house in Tennessee, United States

- U.S. National Register of Historic Places
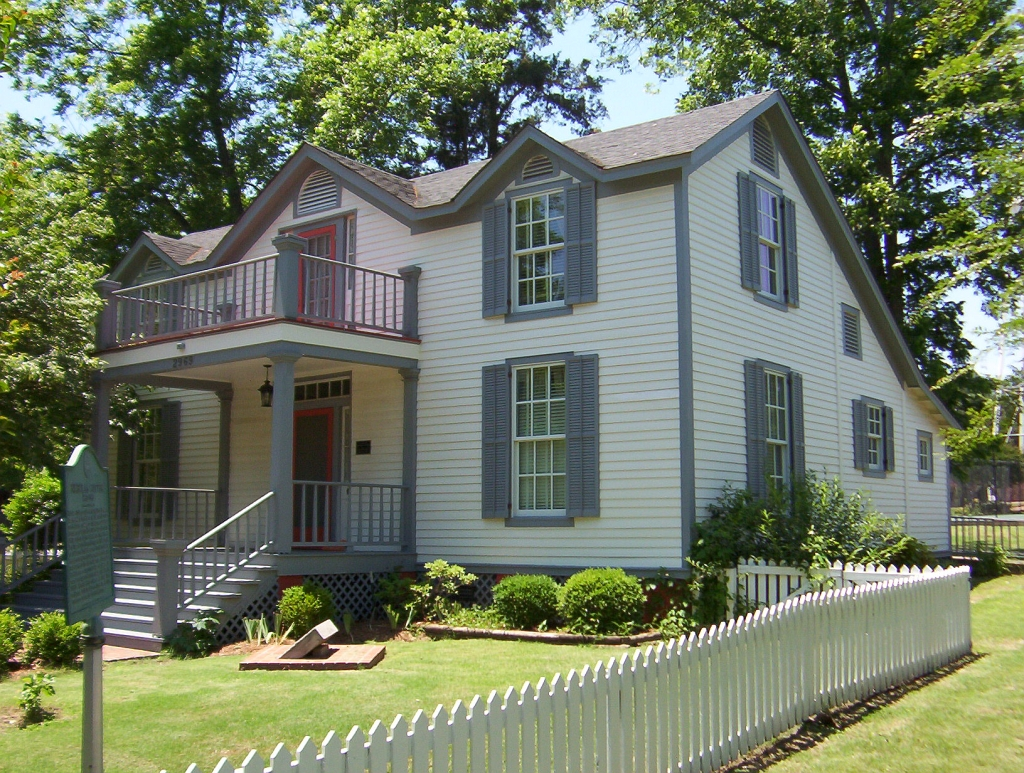
- Nicholas Gotten House (2009)

- Location within Tennessee Location within the United States
- Location: 2969 Court Street; Bartlett, Tennessee; United States
- Coordinates: 35°12′23″N 89°52′26″W
- Built: 1871
- Architect: Nicholas Gotten
- Architectural style: Saltbox Style
- NRHP reference No.: 02000236
- Added to NRHP: March 20, 2002

The Nicholas Gotten House is located on 2969 Court Street in Bartlett, Tennessee, United States. It houses the Bartlett Museum, a local history museum operated by the Bartlett Historical Society.

The white frame structure was built by Nicholas Gotten in 1871. It has a saltbox-style side profile, with an asymmetrical roof which slopes lower on the back.

== History ==
Nicholas Gotten immigrated from Germany at the age of 22 in 1854. He was a blacksmith and served in the Confederate Army during the Civil War under Gen. Nathan Bedford Forrest. In the years following the war, Gotton made a living as a miller and ginner. He and his wife Julia Coleman raised three children in the house.

Until the late 1970s, the Gotten House was owned by the City of Bartlett and used as the Bartlett Police Station. In the early 1980s, the house was leased by the City of Bartlett to the Bartlett Historic Society in a 50-year contract for $1 per year, to save the house from planned demolition and to refurbish the property. The structure became the seat of the Bartlett Historic Society, and since 1990 it has housed the Bartlett Museum. Exhibits on display at the museum are of relevance to local history: the collection includes photographs, written documents on the history of Bartlett, artifacts, and period furniture. The museum is open to the public every first and third Sunday of the month from 2-4 pm. Admission to the museum is free.

On March 20, 2002, the house was listed on the National Register of Historic Places. After a $100,000 renovation in 2007, which included authentic new windows, doors and fixtures, the Gotten house was declared a Bartlett Historic Landmark by the Bartlett Historic Preservation Commission in 2008.

== See also ==
- National Register of Historic Places listings in Tennessee
