= Bartlett City Schools =

School district in Tennessee, United States

Address
- 5705 Stage Rd Bartlett, Tennessee, 38134; United States

District information
- Type: Public
- Grades: Pre-K–12th
- Established: 2013; 13 years ago
- Schools: 10 (2023–24)
- NCES District ID: 4700153

Students and staff
- Students: 8,999 (2023–24)
- Teachers: 545 (FTE) (2023–24)

Other information
- Website: www.bartlettschools.org

Bartlett City Schools is a municipal school district serving Bartlett, Tennessee, United States. The district was established in 2013 and has 10 schools as of 2024.

== Location ==
In February 2014, the school district moved its headquarters from Bartlett City Hall into the former special education offices at Bartlett High School. In December 2018 they moved into their current location at 5705 Stage Road.

== History ==
Following the merger of Memphis City Schools and Shelby County Schools in 2013, a referendum was put forth to the residents of Bartlett to form their own school district. In July 2013, the residents of Bartlett approved the referendum and Bartlett City Schools was created. On December 20, 2013, the Bartlett City Schools board voted unanimously to appoint former Shelby County Schools Deputy Superintendent, David Stephens, as Superintendent. In February 2014, the district approved an open enrollment policy for students who do not live in Bartlett. On August 4, 2014, Bartlett City Schools officially opened for their first day of classes.

== Schools ==
Bartlett City Schools operates the following elementary, middle, and high schools:

Elementary

- Altruria Elementary School
- Bartlett Elementary School
- Bon Lin Elementary School
- Ellendale Elementary School
- Oak Elementary School
- Rivercrest Elementary School

Middle

- Appling Middle School
- Bon Lin Middle School
- Elmore Park Middle School

High

- Bartlett Ninth Grade Academy
- Bartlett High School
