= Cody Fowler =

American lawyer (1892–1978)

- Born: Cody Fowler; December 8, 1892; Arlington, Tennessee
- Died: September 8, 1978 (aged 85); Tampa General Hospital
- Occupation: Attorney
- Known for: Civic leader

Cody Fowler was a lawyer in Tampa, Florida who was noted early in his career for his willingness to defend African Americans in court, something many other white lawyers at the time were unwilling to do. Fowler went on to become chairman of both Tampa and Florida’s Bi-Racial Commissions in 1959, which were formed to help the city and state to navigate racial issues. He was also appointed president of the American Bar Association in 1950, becoming the first Tampa lawyer to attain that distinction. The Cody Fowler House, which was built for him by M. Leo Elliot in 1922, is a historic home in Temple Terrace.

== Early life ==
Born in 1892 in Arlington, Tennessee, Fowler attended the Missouri Military Academy in Mexico, Missouri, Castle Heights School in Lebanon, Tennessee, the University of Missouri, and Cumberland University.

== Career and community involvement ==
Cody Fowler arrived in Tampa in 1924 and was heavily involved in Tampa’s civic life. His mother, Maud Fowler, was involved in the development of Temple Terrace, and served as its first mayor in 1926. Cody Fowler drafted the city charter, served as city attorney, and also served a term as mayor in 1928. Fowler also filed the application for the first federally chartered thrift in Tampa, First Federal (later Freedom Savings and Loan Association), on the first day applications were being accepted as part of the New Deal in 1933. According to those who worked with him at the bank, Fowler used to tell how he merely happened to be in Washington D.C. at the time and visited the office that handled these charters. First Federal was responsible for most of the home loans in Tampa’s emerging communities, as it had no other competition.

In 1943, Cody Fowler and Morris White united to form a partnership in Tampa. Fowler, a charismatic leader, and White, a reserved academic, brought their distinctive personalities together to manage the firm and guide its successful expansion southward. In 1950, Henry Burnett was the third attorney to join the firm’s Miami office. He was followed shortly thereafter by Richard S. Banick. The firm evolved to become Fowler, White, Burnett, Hurley, Banick & Strickroot in the early 1970s – now simply known as Fowler White.

== Tampa Bi-Racial Commission ==
In 1959, Fowler was called upon to chair the Tampa Bi-Racial Commission. Despite his Southern roots, Fowler was committed to peaceful integration, and brought to the Commission other like-minded people who had cooperated on another bi-racial project, the Progress Village housing development for African-American homeowners. In February, 1960, a lunch-counter protest by the NAACP Youth Council in Tampa led some non-affiliated black youths to take on their own protests that resulted in scattered violence. In response to this, as well as at the urging of Governor LeRoy Collins for Fowler to address similar conflicts appearing across the state, Fowler maneuvered the Commission to mediate the dispute, and met privately to urge local businesses to adopt new policies to avoid further tensions. Along with the NAACP and the Merchants Association, the Commission drafted a plan to desegregate lunch counters at the same time, so that angry whites could not visit reprisals on any one establishment. In the following years, the Commission worked in a similarly quiet way to desegregate other services, including the symbolic importance of convincing the Gasparilla Parade Committee to allow black marchers in the parade.

== Legacy ==
- Named Tampa's Man of the Year in 1952.
- Cody Fowler's name now adorns Fowler Avenue in Tampa, Florida.
- The law firm Cody Fowler co-founded, Fowler White Burnett, P.A. still exists today in Miami (main), Fort Lauderdale, West Palm Beach, Jacksonville and Tampa, Florida.
- Cody Fowler's bronze bust is part of Tampa's Riverwalk Historical Monument Trail.
