= Kenneth Walker III =

American football player (born 2000)

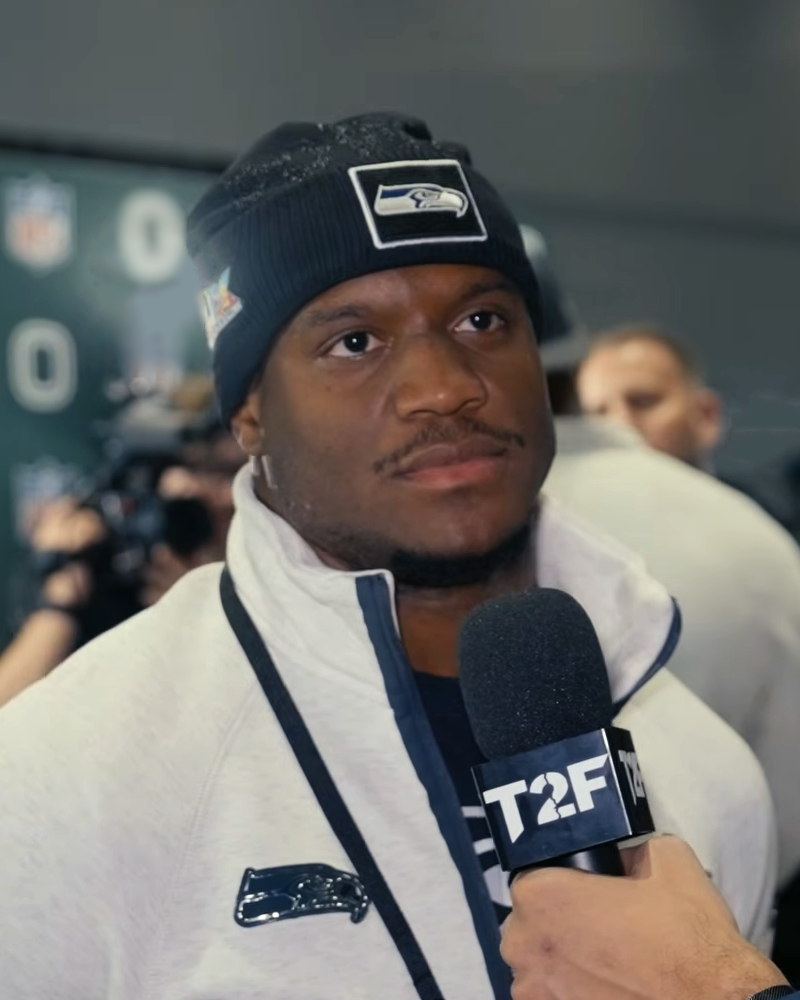
- Walker in 2026

No. 9 – Kansas City Chiefs
- Position: Running back
- Roster status: Active

Personal information
- Born: October 20, 2000 (age 26); Memphis, Tennessee, U.S.
- Listed height: 5 ft 9 in (1.75 m)
- Listed weight: 211 lb (96 kg)

Career information
- High school: Arlington (Arlington, Tennessee)
- College: Wake Forest (2019–2020); Michigan State (2021)
- NFL draft: 2022: 2nd round, 41st overall pick

Career history
- Seattle Seahawks (2022–2025); Kansas City Chiefs (2026–present)

Awards and highlights
- Super Bowl champion (LX); Super Bowl MVP (LX); PFWA All-Rookie Team (2022); Walter Camp Award (2021); Doak Walker Award (2021); Unanimous All-American (2021); Big Ten Running Back of the Year (2021); First-team All-Big Ten (2021)

Career NFL statistics as of Week 9, 2026
- Rushing yards: 4,427
- Rushing average: 4.5
- Rushing touchdowns: 36
- Receptions: 159
- Receiving yards: 1,177
- Receiving touchdowns: 6
- Stats at Pro Football Reference

Kenneth Walker III (born October 20, 2000) is an American professional football running back for the Kansas City Chiefs of the National Football League (NFL). Nicknamed "K9", he played college football for the Wake Forest Demon Deacons and Michigan State Spartans, winning the Walter Camp and Doak Walker Awards in 2021. Walker was selected by the Seattle Seahawks in the second round of the 2022 NFL draft. He spent four seasons in Seattle, being named the MVP of Super Bowl LX in the 2025 season. The following offseason, he signed with the Chiefs.

== Early life ==
Kenneth Walker was born on October 20, 2000, in Memphis, Tennessee. He attended Arlington High School and played for their football team, where he rushed for 3,485 yards with 41 touchdowns. He committed to Wake Forest University to play college football.

== College career ==
Walker played at Wake Forest in 2019 and 2020. During those two years he rushed for 1,158 yards on 217 carries with 17 touchdowns. After the 2020 season, Walker transferred to Michigan State University. He became the starter his first year at Michigan State. In his debut with the Spartans, he rushed for 264 yards and four touchdowns. His four touchdowns doubled the Michigan State 2020 season total, and was the first time for a Spartan running back, in a single game, since the 2019 season. Walker III was awarded the Doak Walker and Walter Camp Player of the Year Award and finished 6th in the Heisman for the 2021 NCAA season. He earned Consensus All-American honors for the 2021 season. Following the season, he announced that he would forgo his senior year and declared for the 2022 NFL draft.

== Professional career ==
Pre-draft measurables
Height	Weight	Arm length	Hand span	Wingspan	40-yard dash	10-yard split	20-yard split	Vertical jump	Broad jump
5 ft 9 1/4 in (1.76 m)	211 lb (96 kg)	30 3/8 in (0.77 m)	9 1/2 in (0.24 m)	6 ft 1 in (1.85 m)	4.38 s	1.49 s	2.53 s	34.0 in (0.86 m)	10 ft 2 in (3.10 m)
All values from NFL Combine

=== Seattle Seahawks ===
==== 2022 ====
Walker was selected by the Seattle Seahawks in the second round with the 41st overall pick in the 2022 NFL draft.

Walker made his NFL debut in Week 2 against the San Francisco 49ers. In Week 5, against the New Orleans Saints, he had a 69-yard rushing touchdown in the 39–32 loss. He was named the starting running back for the Seattle Seahawks after Rashaad Penny was placed on injured reserve. In Week 7, against the Los Angeles Chargers, Walker rushed for 167 yards and two touchdowns in the 37–23 victory. On November 3, Walker was named the NFL's Offensive Rookie of the Month for October. In Week 9, he rushed for 109 yards and two touchdowns in a 31–21 victory over the Arizona Cardinals. In Week 12, he had another game with two rushing touchdowns in the 40–34 loss to the Las Vegas Raiders. He closed out the regular season with three consecutive games with over 100 rushing yards. He finished his rookie season with 228 carries for 1,050 rushing yards and nine rushing touchdowns to go along with 27 receptions for 165 receiving yards. He joined Curt Warner as the only players in franchise history to rush for at least 1,000 yards as a rookie. On January 14, 2023, during the 2022–23 NFL playoffs, Walker rushed the ball 15 times for 63 yards and a touchdown, during a 41–23 Wild Card Round loss to the 49ers. He was named to the 2022 Pro Football Writers of America All-Rookie Team.

==== 2023 ====
In Week 3, Walker totaled 156 scrimmage yards with a pair of rushing touchdowns in a 37–27 win over the Carolina Panthers, earning National Football Conference Offensive Player of the Week. Walker finished the 2023 season with 219 carries for 905 rushing yards and eight rushing touchdowns to go with 29 receptions for 259 receiving yards and one receiving touchdown in 15 games.

==== 2024 ====
Walker dealt with injury throughout the 2024 campaign, making 11 total starts and compiling 573 rushing yards, seven rushing touchdowns, 299 receiving yards, and one receiving touchdown. On December 26, 2024, Walker was placed on injured reserve with an ankle injury, ending his season.

==== 2025: Super Bowl MVP ====
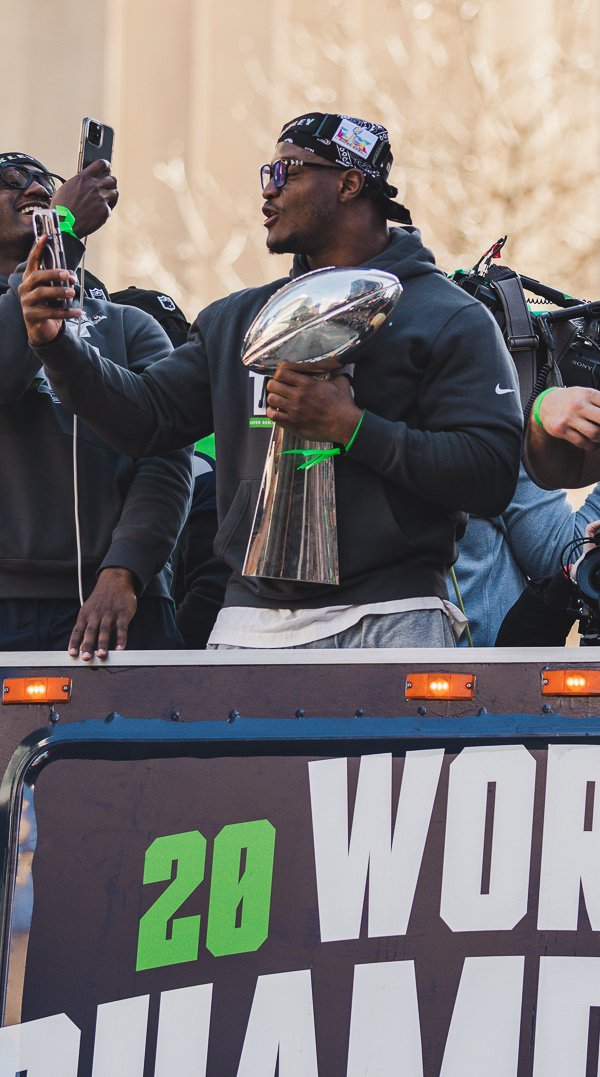
Walker holding the Vince Lombardi Trophy in the Super Bowl LX parade

Walker started all 17 games for the Seahawks for the first time in his career, finishing with 1,027 rushing yards on 221 carries, averaging 4.6 yards per attempt. His rushing touchdown total was lower than in previous years, at five, as fellow running back Zach Charbonnet handled the majority of Seattle’s goal-line carries. Walker also tallied 31 receptions for 282 receiving yards.

Walker's workload increased during the postseason after Charbonnet tore his ACL in the first half of the Seahawks' Divisional round game against the San Francisco 49ers. Walker finished the game with 116 yards and three touchdowns on 19 carries as Seattle won 41–6. Against the Los Angeles Rams in the NFC Championship game, Walker totaled 111 yards from scrimmage and a touchdown, helping the Seahawks secure a 31–27 win and a berth in Super Bowl LX. In Super Bowl LX, Walker amassed 27 carries for a season-high 135 yards and 26 receiving yards, leading the Seahawks to a 29–13 victory over the New England Patriots and earning Super Bowl MVP honors. Walker's 135 rush yards were the most in a Super Bowl since Terrell Davis in Super Bowl XXXII, who was also the last running back named Super Bowl MVP before Walker.

=== Kansas City Chiefs ===
On March 12, 2026, Walker signed a three-year, $45 million contract with the Kansas City Chiefs. In his first game with the team, against the Denver Broncos, he rushed for a career-high 173 yards, plus 18 receiving yards and two touchdowns, earning AFC Offensive Player of the Week honors. In addition, Walker was named AFC Offensive Player of the Month for September.

== Career statistics ==
Legend
	Super Bowl MVP
	Won the Super Bowl
	Led the league
**Bold**	Career High

=== NFL ===
==== Regular season ====
Year	Team	Games		Rushing					Receiving					Fumbles	
Year	Team	GP	GS	Att	Yds	Y/A	Lng	TD	Rec	Yds	Y/R	Lng	TD	Fum	Lost
2022	SEA	15	11	**228**	**1,050**	4.6	74T	**9**	27	165	6.1	33	0	0	0
2023	SEA	15	15	219	905	4.1	45	8	29	259	8.9	**64T**	1	**1**	0
2024	SEA	11	11	153	573	3.7	28	7	**46**	**299**	6.5	21	1	**1**	0
2025	SEA	17	17	221	1,027	4.6	55	5	31	282	**9.1**	46	0	**1**	0
2026	KC	8	8	159	872	**5.5**	**76**	7	26	172	6.6	25	**4**	0	0
Career		66	62	980	4,427	4.5	76	36	159	1,177	7.4	64	6	3	0

==== Postseason ====
Year	Team	Games		Rushing					Receiving					Fumbles	
Year	Team	GP	GS	Att	Yds	Avg	Lng	TD	Rec	Yds	Avg	Lng	TD	Fum	Lost
2022	SEA	1	1	15	63	4.2	9	1	1	3	3.0	3	0	0	0
2025	SEA	3	3	**65**	**313**	**4.8**	**30**	**4**	**11**	**104**	**9.5**	**30**	0	0	0
Career		4	4	80	376	4.7	30	5	12	107	8.9	30	0	0	0

=== College ===
Year	Team	Games		Rushing				Receiving			
Year	Team	GP	GS	Att	Yds	Avg	TD	Rec	Yds	Avg	TD
2019	Wake Forest	13	0	98	579	5.9	4	3	17	5.7	0
2020	Wake Forest	8	8	119	579	4.9	13	3	30	**10.0**	0
2021	Michigan State	12	12	**263**	**1,636**	**6.2**	**18**	**13**	**89**	6.8	**1**
Career		33	20	480	2,794	5.8	35	19	136	7.2	1
