= Habitat for Hope =

US children's health-related organization

Habitat for Hope (HFH) is a nonprofit organization based in Millington, Tennessee. This 501(c) organization was established by Mark Horrocks in 2005. The mission of Habitat for Hope is to support, serve, and care for families facing the serious or long-term illness of a child. The levels of support range from economic to spiritual. Habitat for Hope provides lodging, transportation, and food to families in the mid-south who are undergoing treatment. The families are welcomed into the Habitat for Hope home in Millington for gatherings and counseling. Since its creation in 2005, the organization has served over 400 families.

== Property ==
The 48-acre Habitat for Hope property with a 4,000-square-foot home is located in Shelby Forest at 2041 Locke Cuba Road Millington, Tennessee. The main house houses a staff host family, and up to two additional families at a time. There are two bedrooms and a private bath (short term) within the home that are offered free of charge to family members that come to the area to help care for an ill child. There is also an apartment in lower level of The Refuge that can be used long-term basis by families with chronically ill children. Lodging is also provided in the downtown Memphis area, where Habitat for Hope maintains two fully furnished apartments. All of these living areas are provided free of charge to families who are in the area as a result of a serious illness of a child. Habitat for Hope services any family entering the mid-south for the treatment of a critically ill child. The Habitat for Hope properties allow families, regardless of size, to stay together in a home-like environment.

== Origin ==
Mark and Mylissa Horrocks decided to found this organization as a result of their own personal history. When their daughter, Bella Rose, was diagnosed with stage IIIA melanoma in 2003, the family was uprooted from their home in Florida to come to Memphis for treatment. While the Horrocks family received support from their community back home, they realized that there were many families who relocated to Memphis for medical treatment that did not enjoy similar resources. Because of this, the Horrocks worked with many people, including their friends Rob and Ana Brennan, to create place of refuge for these types of families.

== Funding ==
Habitat for Hope has many fundraising projects. Some of the largest fundraising events are the annual LUVMUD/LUVGLO races. LUVMUD, a 5K obstacle/mud race was created in 2010 specifically to benefit Habitat for Hope. A few years later, LUVGLO was added to family of races. This 5K is a glow in the dark race with glow parties and glow pools. From 2010 to 2013, over 6,000 runners have participated in these races, and 100% of the profits after cost go directly to Habitat for Hope
