= Arlington High School (Tennessee) =

Location
- 5475 Airline Road; Arlington, Tennessee 38002; United States
- 35°16′34″N 89°40′00″W

Information
- Type: Public
- Established: 2004
- School district: Arlington Community Schools
- Principal: Christopher Davis
- Grades: 9-12
- Enrollment: 1,674 (2024-2025)
- Colors: Navy and Old gold
- Nickname: Tigers
- Team name: Arlington Tigers
- Website: AHS Home Page

Arlington High School is a public high school located in Arlington, Tennessee, United States. It was opened in 2004 and had an enrollment of 1,866 students in the 2023–24 school year.

== History ==
The town of Arlington, lying within Shelby County, had been a low-population area since its establishment in 1883. However, in the 1990s, the area experienced rapid growth. As a result, the school system became overloaded, with Bolton High School in particular being over capacity. Community developers decided another high school was inevitable, and The Shelby County School Board of Education broke ground for the school, finishing just in time for the first class of 9th graders to enroll in 2004.

Originally, the land the school sits on was used for Arlington Municipal Airport, which was officially closed in 2002. Located on 75 acres (300,000 m^{2}) at Airline Road and Milton Wilson Road, Arlington High School began enrollment for 9th grade students in 2004 in the Shelby County Schools district. In 2014, Principal Tammy Mason left to head the newly formed Arlington Community Schools; Chris Duncan replaced her. Starting in the 2014–2015 school year, AHS has been part of Arlington Community Schools.

== Student academics ==
Around 1,900 students attend Arlington High School. Seventy-one percent of these students are White, twenty-two percent are African American, three percent are Hispanic, and two percent are Asian. Students are offered a very diverse and well-rounded curriculum, offering a wide variety of choices such as Advanced Placement courses, honors courses, a range of vocational programs such as Health Occupations Students of America and Criminal Justice. Students are asked to find a focus plan such as liberal arts or journalism to guide their class selection.

== Notable alumni ==
- Julien Baker - solo musician and member of boygenius
- Tyler Gentry – Major League Baseball player
- Jake Golday - college football linebacker
- Hunter Goodman - Major League Baseball player
- Kenneth Walker III - National Football League player

== Extra-curricular activities ==
Different activities are available for after-school hours as well, such as a large choice of athletics programs like baseball, basketball, American football, golf, tennis, soccer, lacrosse, cheerleading and marching band. The school also offers a number of after-school clubs that are non-athletic. These include Advanced Art Club, Ambassadors, Student Ministry, Art Club, Beta Club, Best Buddies, Book Club, Bridge Builders, CLICK, DECA, Future Business Leaders, HOSA, Key Club, Multicultural Club, National Art Honor Society, National Honor Society, National Technical Honor Society, Poetry Club, AHS Rocketry Club, Science National Honor Society, AHS Science Olympiad, Skills USA, Student Government Association and Theatre. Arlington High School has its own online newspaper called The Prowl. It consists of A&E, news, opinions, sports, and Tiger Life. Students also receive news through videos made by AHS TigerLife, a student-run organization.

== Faculty ==
Arlington High School's principal is Christopher Davis. There are 106.5 teachers. Over 59% of the faculty hold advanced degrees, and over 61% have taught for ten or more years. The school has six counselors (one for each grade), a college and career counselor, and a school social worker.
