= Arlington, Tennessee =

- Town
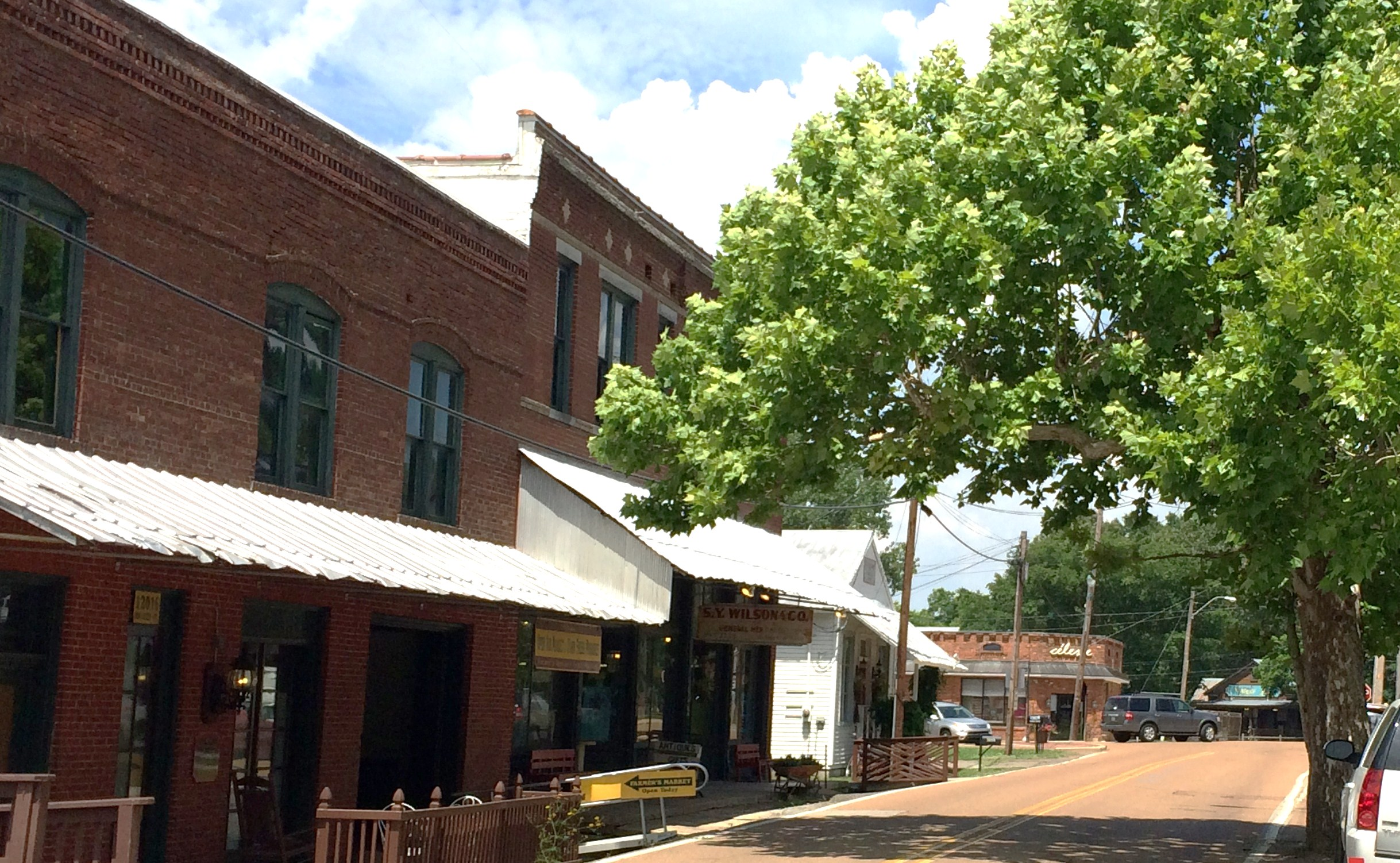
- Depot Square in Arlington

- Flag Seal

- Location of Arlington in Shelby County, Tennessee.

- Location within Tennessee Location within the United States Location within North America
- Coordinates: 35°16′40″N 89°40′24″W
- Country: United States
- State: Tennessee
- County: Shelby
- First settled: 1830; 196 years ago
- Incorporated (as Haysville): 1878; 148 years ago
- Incorporated (as Arlington): Dec 19, 1900; 125 years ago

Government
  - Mayor: Mike Wissman
  - Vice Mayor: Harry McKee

Area
  - Total: 23.16 sq mi (59.99 km^{2})
  - Land: 23.15 sq mi (59.96 km^{2})
  - Water: 0.012 sq mi (0.03 km^{2})
- Elevation: 282 ft (86 m)

Population (2020)
  - Total: 14,549
  - Density: 628.5/sq mi (242.65/km^{2})
- Time zone: UTC-6 (Central (CST))
  - Summer (DST): UTC-5 (CDT)
- ZIP code: 38002, 38028
- Area code: 901
- FIPS code: 47-01740
- GNIS feature ID: 1304869
- Website: www.townofarlington.org

Arlington is a town in the U.S. state of Tennessee. It is one of the seven municipalities in Shelby County. The town was officially incorporated as Haysville in 1878 and again as Arlington in 1900. The population was 2,569 at the 2000 census, 11,517 at the 2010 census, and 14,549 at the 2020 Census. From 2010 until 2020 the town's population grew by 26.33%.

== Government ==
According to the town's official website, Arlington follows a general law Mayor-Aldermanic charter and is governed by the Board of Mayor and Aldermen (BMA), the members of which are elected to 4-year terms. The current mayor is Mike Wissman, who was originally elected in September 2011 and is serving his 4th term. The current Vice Mayor is Harry McKee. Arlington has six alderman: Larry Harmon, Dwight Barker, Jeff McKee, Oscar Brooks, Harry McKee, and Jeremy Biggs.

Within the Arlington government, there are 9 recognized boards and committees: Board of Zoning Appeals, Design Review Committee, Finance Committee, Health & Safety Committee, Industrial Development Board, Library Board, Parks and Recreation Committee, Planning Commission, and the Board of Education (Arlington Community Schools).

== History ==
=== Early Settlement and Founding ===
The area now known as Arlington, Tennessee, was originally inhabited by the Chickasaw Nation. Following the Treaty of Tuscaloosa, this territory, along with other parts of West Tennessee, was ceded to the United States. On November 24, 1819, Shelby County was established, named in honor of Isaac Shelby, a commissioner involved in the treaty negotiations, a veteran of the American Revolutionary War, and the first governor of Kentucky. By the 1830s, the nascent community comprised fewer than 20 settlers.

=== Establishment of Withe Depot and Economic Growth ===
By 1856, the population had increased to approximately 200 residents. Agriculture, particularly cotton farming, was the dominant economic activity, necessitating reliable transportation for shipping goods. In response, Withe Depot was constructed on land donated by General Samuel J. Hays, a nephew of President Andrew Jackson, strategically served by the Memphis, Clarksville and Louisville Railroad. The depot became a critical shipping point, primarily for cotton, to support the agricultural economy of the region. In recognition of General Hays's substantial land donation, the community was subsequently named Haysville.

The railroad infrastructure significantly shaped Haysville's development and connectivity. A local train, colloquially referred to as "The Accommodation," became a vital link for residents commuting to Memphis for work and school. Anecdotes from the period suggest that the train's crew, including the engineer, flagman, and conductor, were familiar with the daily passengers, occasionally slowing the train to accommodate late arrivals running from their homes to board.

=== Impact of the Civil War and Subsequent Recovery ===
The onset of the American Civil War brought considerable disruption to Haysville. Many local men enlisted to fight in the conflict, and a significant number did not return, affecting the town's population and growth trajectory. In 1872, following the war, land owned by the estate of General Hays was subdivided and sold at public auction. Streets in the new layout were named to honor notable figures such as Bishop Charles Quintard, President Andrew Jackson, Colonel Robert I. Chester, and General Nathan Bedford Forrest. The first residential structure was constructed by Captain Henry Munger Pitman, who served as the depot agent.

=== Incorporation and Public Health Measures ===
Haysville was formally incorporated on February 10, 1878, with W.B. Nolley elected as its first mayor. During this period, an outbreak of yellow fever prompted local authorities to enforce a quarantine, restricting entry to the town in an effort to prevent the spread of the epidemic. The town's early leaders, including subsequent mayors H.Y. Marley, Dr. J.P. Bone, W.I. Hooks, and C.C. Poole, were instrumental in guiding the community through this public health crisis.

=== Renaming to Arlington and Late 19th-Century Expansion ===
In 1883, the need for a local post office led town officials to discover that a "Haysville" post office already existed within the state. Captain Henry Pitman suggested renaming the town "Arlington," inspired by Arlington National Cemetery in Virginia. The inaugural school in the town, Memphis District High School, was established in January 1884 by the Memphis Conference of Methodist Church. It was situated on the site that is presently known as Hughes-College Hill Park. By this time, the population had reached 500 residents, and the town's economy had diversified to include a steam sawmill, gristmill, steam cotton gin, livery stable, general stores, and four churches. By the close of the 19th century, Arlington had expanded its infrastructure to include a dedicated post office, a physician's practice, a druggist, a lumber store, a meat market, and an undertaker's establishment.

Arlington was re-incorporated in December 1900 with a population of around 600. Early mayors included notable figures such as Will Taylor, Charles McAuley, C.W. Bond, Sam Tucker Wilson, and Jimmy Henry, who played key roles in the town's governance and development.

=== Preservation of Historical Landmarks ===
Arlington has made a concerted effort to preserve its historical heritage. Prominent landmarks include the Rachel H.K. Burrows Museum, the S.Y. Wilson & Company building, the Blacksmith Shop, and the Historic Post Office. Additionally, a replica of the original 19th-century railroad depot was constructed in 2003, now serving as the Arlington Senior Citizens Center. Several historic residential structures remain intact, showcasing the architectural styles of the period.

== Geography ==
According to the United States Census Bureau, the town has a total area of 23.16 square miles (60.0 km^{2}), of which 23.15 square miles (60.0 km^{2}) is land and 0.01 square miles (0.026 km^{2}) is water.

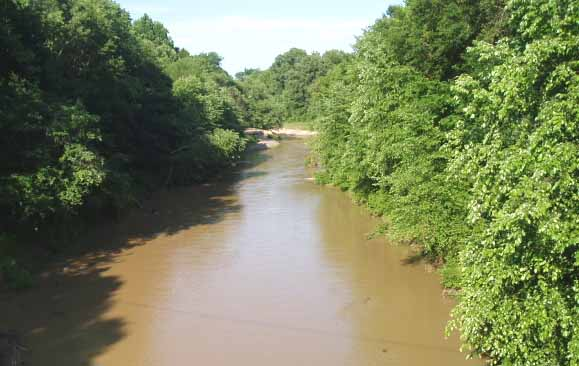
Loosahatchie River in Arlington

== Demographics ==
Historical population
| Census | Pop. | Note | %± |
|---|---|---|---|
| 1890 | 343 | | — |
| 1910 | 477 | | — |
| 1920 | 494 | | 3.6% |
| 1930 | 446 | | −9.7% |
| 1940 | 440 | | −1.3% |
| 1950 | 463 | | 5.2% |
| 1960 | 620 | | 33.9% |
| 1970 | 1,349 | | 117.6% |
| 1980 | 1,778 | | 31.8% |
| 1990 | 1,541 | | −13.3% |
| 2000 | 2,569 | | 66.7% |
| 2010 | 11,517 | | 348.3% |
| 2020 | 14,549 | | 26.3% |
| 2025 (est.) | 15,703 | ▲ | 7.9% |

=== 2020 census ===
As of the 2020 census, Arlington had a population of 14,549. The median age was 34.6 years. 32.7% of residents were under the age of 18 and 7.2% of residents were 65 years of age or older. For every 100 females there were 97.2 males, and for every 100 females age 18 and over there were 93.1 males age 18 and over.

91.4% of residents lived in urban areas, while 8.6% lived in rural areas.

There were 4,539 households in Arlington, of which 56.4% had children under the age of 18 living in them. Of all households, 70.4% were married-couple households, 9.6% were households with a male householder and no spouse or partner present, and 16.7% were households with a female householder and no spouse or partner present. About 11.8% of all households were made up of individuals and 3.7% had someone living alone who was 65 years of age or older. There were 3,046 families.

There were 4,640 housing units, of which 2.2% were vacant. The homeowner vacancy rate was 0.7% and the rental vacancy rate was 4.7%.

Arlington racial composition
| Race | Num. | Perc. |
|---|---|---|
| White (non-Hispanic) | 10,719 | 73.68% |
| Black or African American (non-Hispanic) | 1,916 | 13.17% |
| Native American | 39 | 0.27% |
| Asian | 342 | 2.35% |
| Pacific Islander | 11 | 0.08% |
| Other/Mixed | 745 | 5.12% |
| Hispanic or Latino | 777 | 5.34% |

=== 2010 census ===
At the 2010 census, there were 11,517 people, and 3,739 households. The population density was 565 inhabitants per square mile (218/km^{2}). The racial composition of the town was 81.24% White, 13.84% African American, 0.16% Native American, 1.80% Asian, 0.86% from other races, 2.08% from two or more races, and 0.02% from Native Hawaiian and Other Pacific Islander. Hispanic or Latino of any race were 2.98%.

Of the 3,907 households, 35.23% were 1-2 person occupied, 48.02% were 3-4 person occupied, 15.32% were 5-6 person occupied, 1.42% were 7 or more person households, and 4.2% were listed as unoccupied. With the 3,907 households owned in Arlington, they are estimated to have a median value of $217,300.

The age distribution was 37.53% under the age of 18, 3.47% from 18 to 24, 35.62% from 25 to 44, 19.20% from 45 to 64, and 4.19% 65 or older. The median age was 32.2 years. The population was 49% male and 51% female.

=== Income and poverty ===
From 2013 to 2017, Arlington's estimated household income was predicted to be $99,404. This has increased since 2009, when the household income was estimated to be $85,779.

=== 2000 census ===
At the 2000 census, there were 2,569 people, 794 households, and 669 families in the town. The population density was 125.8 inhabitants per square mile (48.6/km^{2}). There were 928 housing units at an average density of 45.4 units per square mile (17.5 units/km^{2}). The racial composition of the town was 74.23% White, 23.01% African American, 0.47% Native American, 0.62% Asian, 0.54% from other races, and 1.13% from two or more races. Hispanic or Latino of any race were 1.13%.

Of the 794 households, 42.8% had children under the age of 18 living with them, 67.1% were married couples living together, 13.5% had a female householder with no husband present, and 15.7% were non-families. 12.2% of households were one person and 5.7% were one person aged 65 or older. The average household size was 2.88 and the average family size was 3.15.

The age distribution was 26.1% under the age of 18, 5.8% from 18 to 24, 37.6% from 25 to 44, 22.6% from 45 to 64, and 8.0% 65 or older. The median age was 36 years. For every 100 females, there were 97.5 males. For every 100 females age 18 and over, there were 92.8 males.

The median household income was $52,870 and the median family income was $55,602. Males had a median income of $38,438 versus $29,138 for females. The per capita income for the town was $19,569. About 3.1% of families and 11.3% of the population were below the poverty line, including 4.4% of those under age 18 and 23.2% of those age 65 or over.

== Arts and culture ==
=== Civic Events and Community Traditions ===
Depot Square has historically served as the focal point for community gatherings and events. The "Brunswick Stew" town reunion was a longstanding tradition that brought together residents for many years. In recent decades, the town has hosted several popular events, including "Arlington in April," "Music on the Square," "Harvest Gathering," and the annual Christmas Parade. These events continue to foster a sense of community and celebrate Arlington's cultural and historical legacy.

== Education ==
Arlington is served by Arlington Community Schools. As of 2013, the school district has a student-teacher ratio of 18:1.

There are four schools located within the municipality of Arlington:

- Arlington Elementary School: K-5
- Donelson Elementary School: K-5
- Arlington Middle School: 6–8
- Arlington High School: 9–12

Arlington Community schools was created in 2014, and it began with an enrollment of 4,907 students.

== Notable people ==
- Jonathan Bowlan (born 1996), Major League Baseball pitcher
- Latasha Byears (born 1973), professional basketball player
- Clay Crosse (born 1967), Christian music artist
- Cody Fowler (1892–1978), attorney
- James Ernest Karnes (1889–1966), U.S. Army Sergeant
- Kenneth Walker III (born 2000), professional football player; Super Bowl 60 MVP
