= Bartlett, Tennessee =

- City
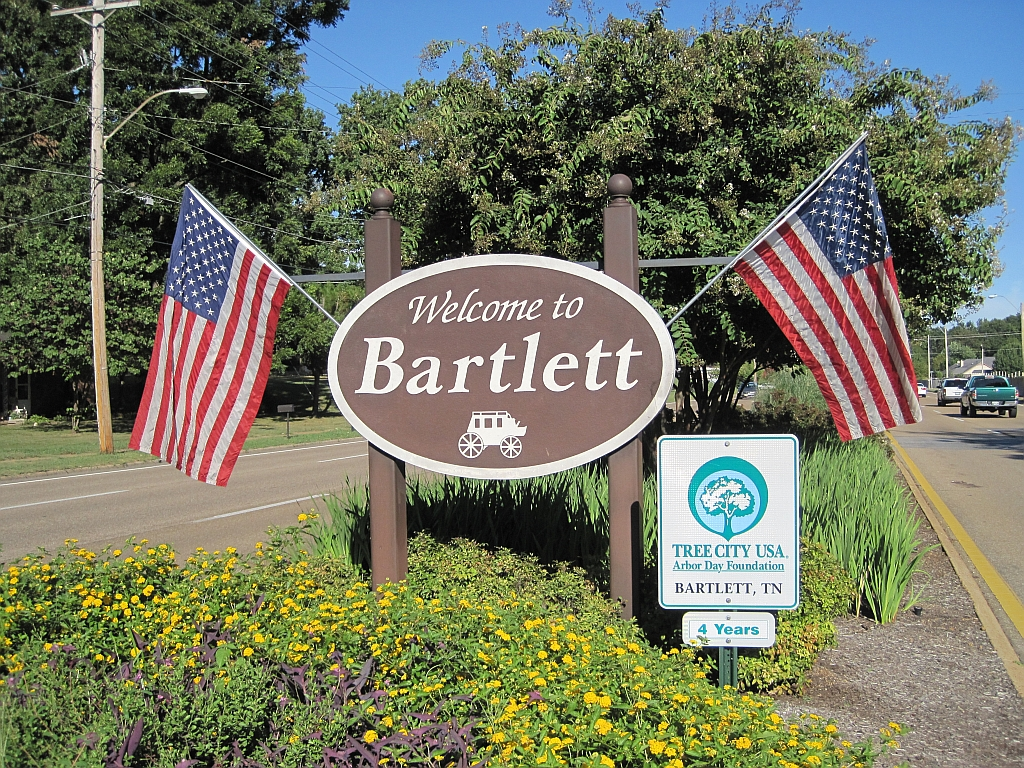
- Welcome to Bartlett

- Flag Logo
- Interactive map of Bartlett, Tennessee
- Location within Tennessee Location within the United States
- Coordinates: 35.2342°N 89.8203°W
- Country: United States
- State: Tennessee
- County: Shelby
- Founded: 1829
- Incorporated: November 1, 1866
- Founder: Major Gabriel M. Bartlett

Government
  - Type: Mayor–council
  - Mayor: David Parsons (R)

Area
  - City: 32.652 sq mi (84.568 km^{2})
  - Land: 32.639 sq mi (84.535 km^{2})
  - Water: 0.013 sq mi (0.034 km^{2}) 0.04%
- Elevation: 322 ft (98 m)

Population (2020)
  - City: 57,786
  - Estimate (2024): 56,708
  - Rank: US: 726th TN: 14th
  - Density: 1,770.5/sq mi (683.57/km^{2})
  - Urban: 1,056,190 (US: 45th)
  - Metro: 1,341,412 (US: 45th)
- Time zone: UTC−6 (Central (CST))
  - Summer (DST): UTC−5 (CDT)
- ZIP Codes: 38002, 38133, 38134, 38135, 38184
- Area code: 901
- FIPS code: 47-03440
- GNIS feature ID: 2403162
- Website: cityofbartlett.org

Bartlett is a city in Shelby County, Tennessee, United States. The population was 57,786 at the 2020 census, and was estimated at 56,708 in 2024, making it the 14th-most populous city in Tennessee.

== History ==
Bartlett, originally called "Union Depot", first served as the last major Tennessean depot along the westward stagecoach route from Nashville. It later shifted to serve as a rail station after the stagecoach route was replaced by the Memphis & Ohio Railroad. An agricultural community gradually emerged around the depot and subsequent station that saw little growth until after the American Civil War.

The community saw quick growth during Reconstruction, and by 1886 was home to a school, two gristmills, three churches, several general stores, and about 300 inhabitants. It had been officially incorporated on November 1, 1866, with a population of less than 100 under the inaugural mayorship of Bryan Wither. The city derived its name from Major Gabriel M. Bartlett, a planter and pioneer settler of the area, whose homeplace was located on the old Raleigh-Somerville Road (Stage Road) at the present location of Bartlett Station Plaza.

== Geography ==
According to the United States Census Bureau, the city has a total area of 32.652 square miles (84.57 km^{2}), of which 32.639 square miles (84.53 km^{2}) is land and 0.013 square miles (0.034 km^{2}) (0.04%) is water.

== Demographics ==
Historical population
Census	Pop.	Note	%±
1870	244		—
1880	242		−0.8%
1900	200		—
1910	263		31.5%
1920	271		3.0%
1930	429		58.3%
1940	400		−6.8%
1950	489		22.3%
1960	508		3.9%
1970	1,150		126.4%
1980	17,170		1,393.0%
1990	26,989		57.2%
2000	40,543		50.2%
2010	54,613		34.7%
2020	57,786		5.8%
2025 (est.)	56,416	▼	−2.4%
U.S. Decennial Census; 2020 Census

According to realtor website Zillow, the average price of a home as of March 31, 2026, in Bartlett is $321,267.

As of the 2024 American Community Survey, there were 20,051 estimated households in Bartlett with an average of 2.80 persons per household. The city has a median household income of $102,070. Approximately 5.1% of the city's population lives at or below the poverty line. Bartlett has an estimated 61.6% employment rate, with 35.7% of the population holding a bachelor's degree or higher and 95.1% holding a high school diploma. There were 20,665 housing units at an average density of 633.14 per square mile (244.5/km^{2}).

The top five reported languages (people were allowed to report up to two languages, thus the figures will generally add to more than 100%) were English (91.6%), Spanish (3.2%), Indo-European (1.7%), Asian and Pacific Islander (2.1%), and Other (1.4%).

The median age in the city was 41.2 years.

Bartlett, Tennessee – racial and ethnic composition Note: the US Census treats Hispanic/Latino as an ethnic category. This table excludes Latinos from the racial categories and assigns them to a separate category. Hispanics/Latinos may be of any race.
Race / ethnicity (NH = non-Hispanic)	Pop. 1990	Pop. 2000	Pop. 2010	Pop. 2020	% 1990	% 2000	% 2010	% 2020
White alone (NH)	25,866	37,178	42,158	39,182	95.84%	91.70%	77.19%	67.81%
Black or African American alone (NH)	647	1,965	8,721	11,524	2.40%	4.85%	15.97%	19.94%
Native American or Alaska Native alone (NH)	22	105	116	101	0.08%	0.26%	0.21%	0.17%
Asian alone (NH)	255	500	1,350	1,920	0.94%	1.23%	2.47%	3.32%
Pacific Islander alone (NH)	—	17	20	28	—	0.04%	0.04%	0.05%
Other race alone (NH)	9	34	46	188	0.03%	0.08%	0.08%	0.33%
Mixed race or multiracial (NH)	—	282	732	2,339	—	0.70%	1.34%	4.05%
Hispanic or Latino (any race)	190	462	1,470	2,504	0.70%	1.14%	2.69%	4.33%
Total	26,989	40,543	54,613	57,786	100.00%	100.00%	100.00%	100.00%

=== 2020 census ===
As of the 2020 census, there were 57,786 people, 21,078 households, and 16,281 families residing in the city. The population density was 1,790.20 inhabitants per square mile (691.2/km^{2}). There were 21,572 housing units at an average density of 668.30 per square mile (258.0/km^{2}). The racial makeup of the city was 68.64% White, 20.08% African American, 0.25% Native American, 3.34% Asian, 0.06% Pacific Islander, 1.79% from some other races and 5.84% from two or more races. Hispanic or Latino people of any race were 4.33% of the population.

There were 21,078 households in Bartlett, of which 34.1% had children under the age of 18 living in them. Of all households, 60.6% were married-couple households, 12.2% were households with a male householder and no spouse or partner present, and 23.3% were households with a female householder and no spouse or partner present. About 19.4% of all households were made up of individuals and 9.6% had someone living alone who was 65 years of age or older.

Of the residents, 22.6% of residents were under the age of 18 and 18.5% of residents were 65 years of age or older. For every 100 females there were 92.6 males, and for every 100 females age 18 and over there were 89.2 males age 18 and over. The homeowner vacancy rate was 0.7% and the rental vacancy rate was 4.9%.

=== 2010 census ===
As of the 2010 census, there were 54,613 people, 19,456 households, and 15,552 families residing in the city. The population density was 2,049.19 inhabitants per square mile (791.2/km^{2}). There were 20,143 housing units at an average density of 755.81 per square mile (291.8/km^{2}). The racial makeup of the city was 78.69% White, 16.06% African American, 0.25% Native American, 2.50% Asian, 0.04% Pacific Islander, 0.85% from some other races and 1.60% from two or more races. Hispanic or Latino people of any race were 2.69% of the population.

=== 2000 census ===
As of the 2000 census, there were 40,543 people, 13,773 households, and 11,817 families residing in the city. The population density was 2,124.50 inhabitants per square mile (820.3/km^{2}). There were 14,021 housing units at an average density of 734.72 per square mile (283.7/km^{2}). The racial makeup of the city was 92.44% White, 4.86% African American, 0.28% Native American, 1.24% Asian, 0.04% Pacific Islander, 0.37% from some other races and 0.77% from two or more races. Hispanic or Latino people of any race were 1.14% of the population.

There were 13,773 households out of which 44.0% have children under the age of 18 living with them, 74.6% were married couples living together, 8.7% have a female householder with no husband present, and 14.2% were non-families. 12.1% of all households were made up of individuals and 4.3% have someone living alone who was 65 years of age or older. The average household size was 2.92 and the average family size was 3.18.

In the city the population was spread out with 29.1% under the age of 18, 6.8% from 18 to 24, 30.0% from 25 to 44, 25.5% from 45 to 64, and 8.6% who were 65 years of age or older. The median age was 37 years. For every 100 females there were 95.4 males. For every 100 females age 18 and over, there were 91.2 males.

The median income for a household in the city was $66,369, and the median income for a family was $69,962. Males have a median income of $45,281 versus $32,382 for females. The per capita income for the city was $24,616. 2.7% of the population and 2.1% of families were below the poverty line. Out of the total people living in poverty, 3.2% were under the age of 18 and 5.7% were 65 or older.

== Arts and culture ==
=== Performing Arts and Conference Center ===
The Bartlett Performing Arts & Conference Center, also known as BPACC, was finished in 1999 where it held its first show by Art Garfunkel. BPACC is located at 3663 Appling Road, directly across the street from the Bartlett Police Station and Appling Middle School. The facility is not limited to performances but can be rented out for other events such as seminars or business meetings.

==== Nicholas Gotten House ====
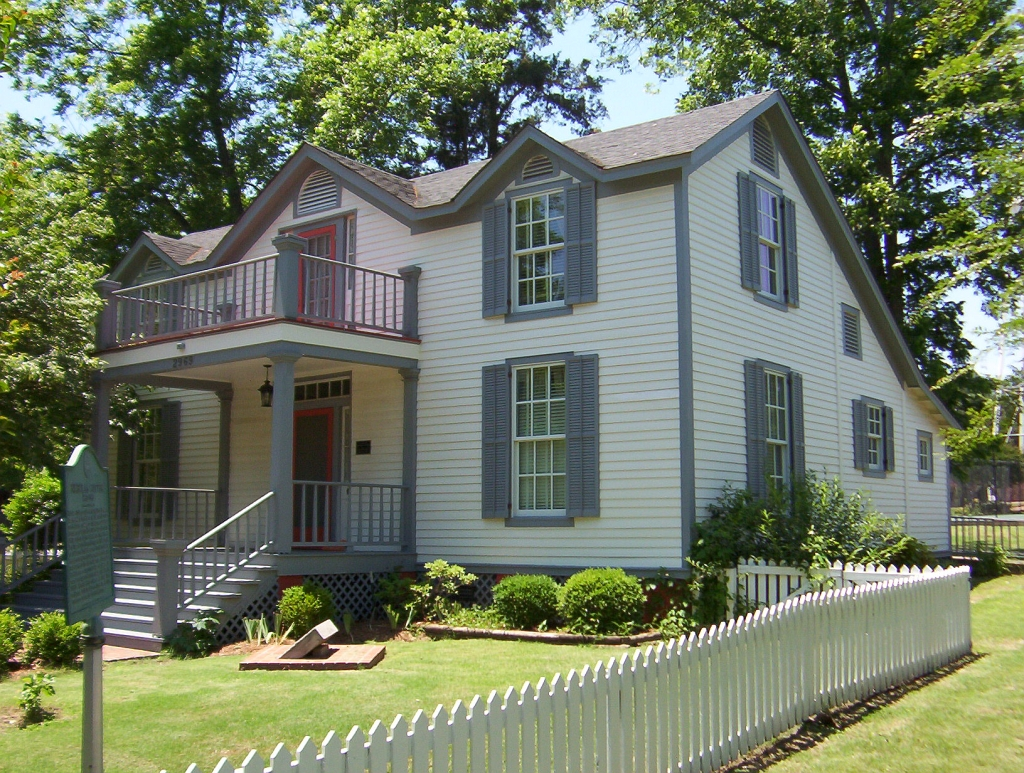
Nicholas Gotten House

The Nicholas Gotten House is located at 2969 Court Street. It houses the Bartlett Museum, a local history museum operated by the Bartlett Historical Society. The white frame structure was built by Nicholas Gotten in 1871 in the New England saltbox style.

== Parks and recreation ==
The Bartlett Recreation Center is a 55,000 sq ft (5,100 m^{2}) facility that was completed in August 2000.

== Education ==
Bartlett's public school system was part of the Shelby County Schools until the end of the 2013–2014 school year. On July 16, 2013, the residents of Bartlett approved a referendum to form a Bartlett City School District. This district launched in fall 2014 and includes the 11 school buildings within Bartlett city limits, according to an agreement reached between parties to a federal lawsuit. The district's superintendent is David Stephens, former deputy superintendent of Shelby County Schools.
