= North Memphis, Memphis, Tennessee =

Coordinates: 35.216°N 89.924°W

North Memphis
- Neighborhood
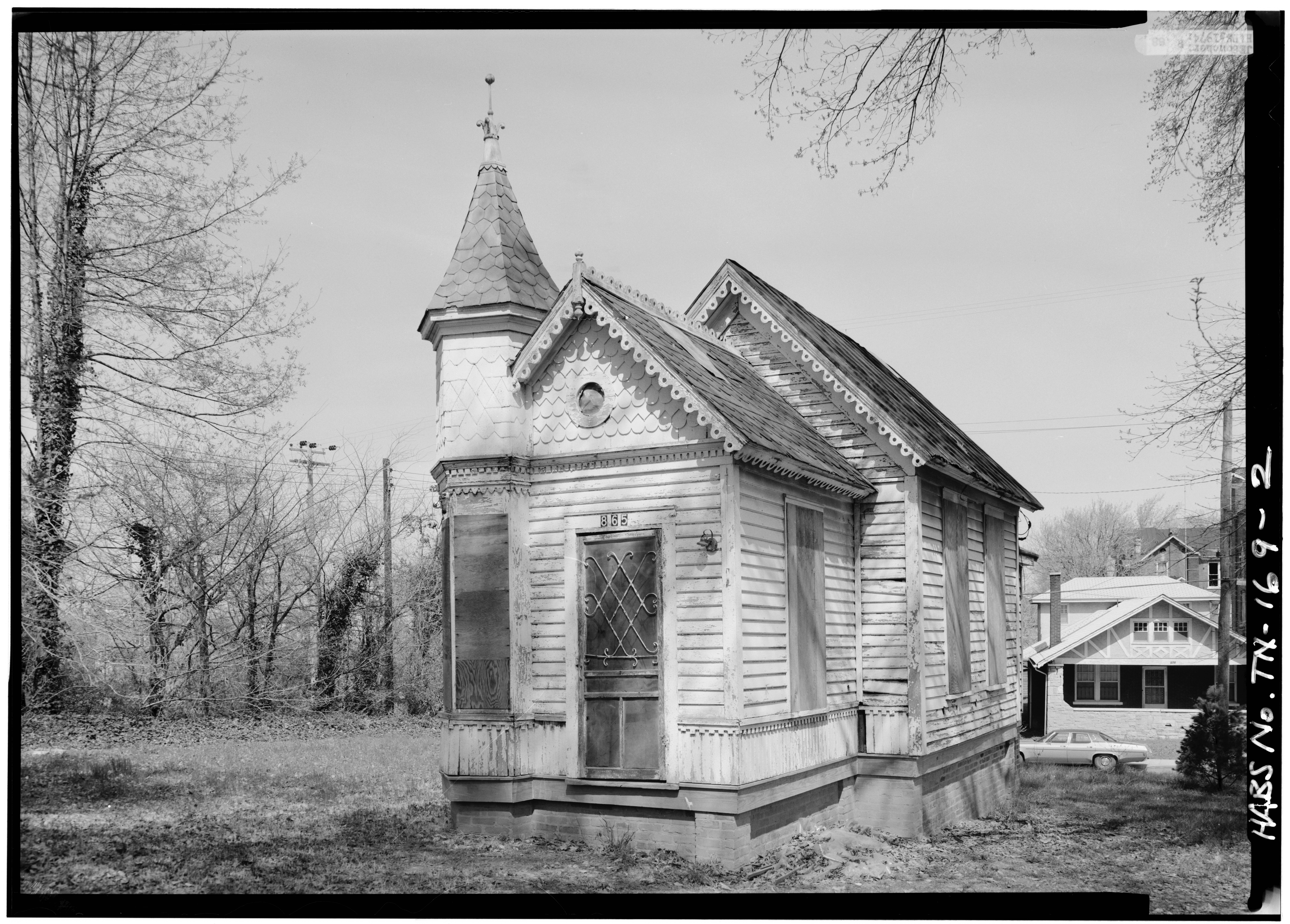
- Handwerker Gingerbread Playhouse
- Interactive map of North Memphis
- Country: United States
- State: Tennessee
- Counties: Shelby
- Settled: 1937
- Incorporated: 1942

Government
  - Mayor: Paul Young
- Zip code: 38108-38128
- Area code: 901

North Memphis is one of the five defined districts of Memphis, Tennessee. It includes smaller neighborhoods such as Klondike, New Chicago, Douglass, Hyde Park, Hollywood, Nutbush, Binghampton, Smokey City, Scutterfeld, Frayser, and Raleigh.

== History ==
North Memphis flourished during the 19th and 20th centuries. Klondike and Smokey City are two of the oldest African American elite communities in Memphis. Historic neighborhoods like Speedway Terrace, Vollintine-Evergreen, and Shelby Forest were home to wealthy families and a vibrant manufacturing industry.

In 1887, Memphis Artesian Water Company in North Memphis began digging artesian wells to create a modern sewer system. The facility was eventually torn down to expand parking for St. Jude Children's Research Hospital

On January 19, 1937, the Firestone Tire and Rubber Company opened what would become its most productive factory, located in the New Chicago neighborhood of Memphis. In 1942, in Frayser on 260 acres of land, International Harvester built the largest farm-equipment manufacturing plant in the South.

By the end of the 20th century, the industrial hub in North Memphis steadily declined as manufacturing jobs disappeared due to deindustrialization. Companies that closed their operations include Firestone, International Harvester, Cleo, Schering-Plough, Maybelline, Velsicol Chemical Corporation, Kimberly-Clark and Chemtura. The companies still operating were chemical plants known for heavy pollution. The Douglass community still had eight polluting facilities.

== Music ==
North Memphis produced musicians like Laura Dukes, Gary Harrison, Greg Cartwright and rappers like Project Pat, Juicy J, Yo Gotti, Snootie Wild, Ceo D.We$t, Frayser Boy, Lil Wyte, Cities Aviv, Mac Critter, Tony Snow (rapper), and C-Mo.

== Gallery ==
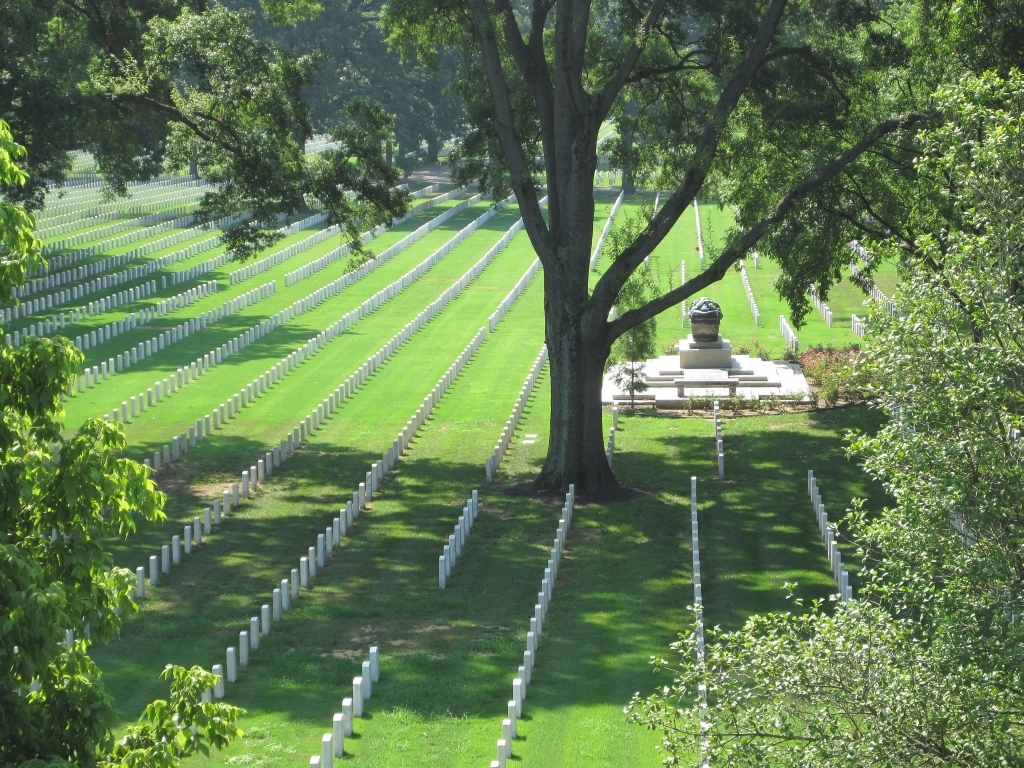
Memphis National Cemetery

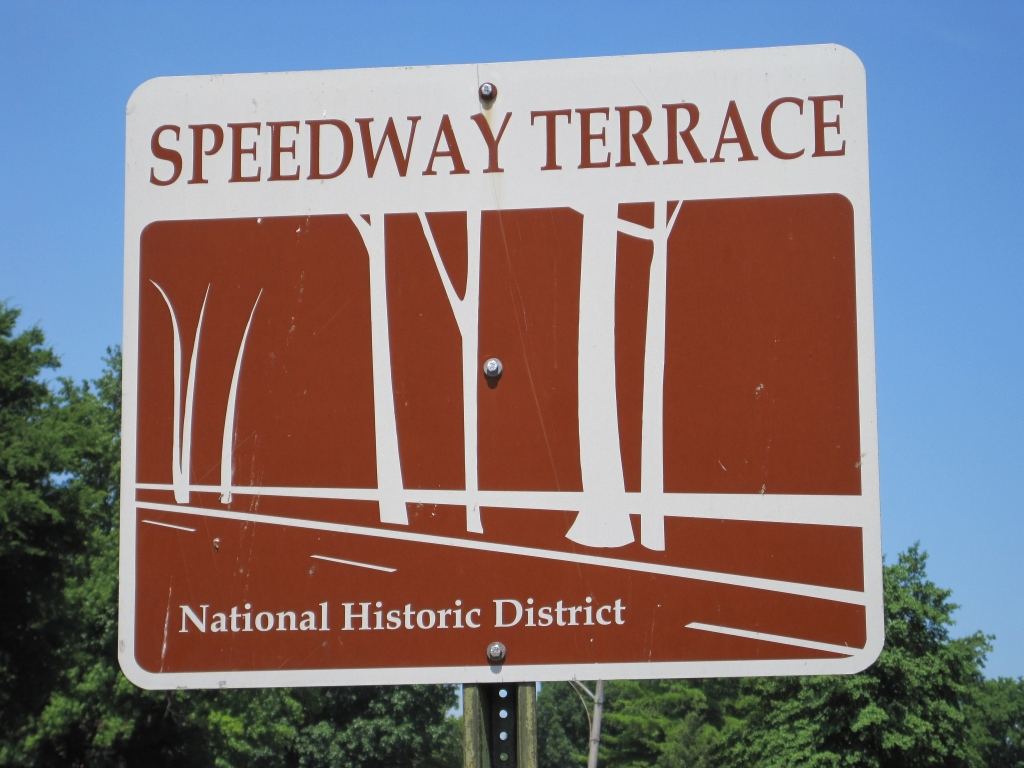
Speedway Terrace

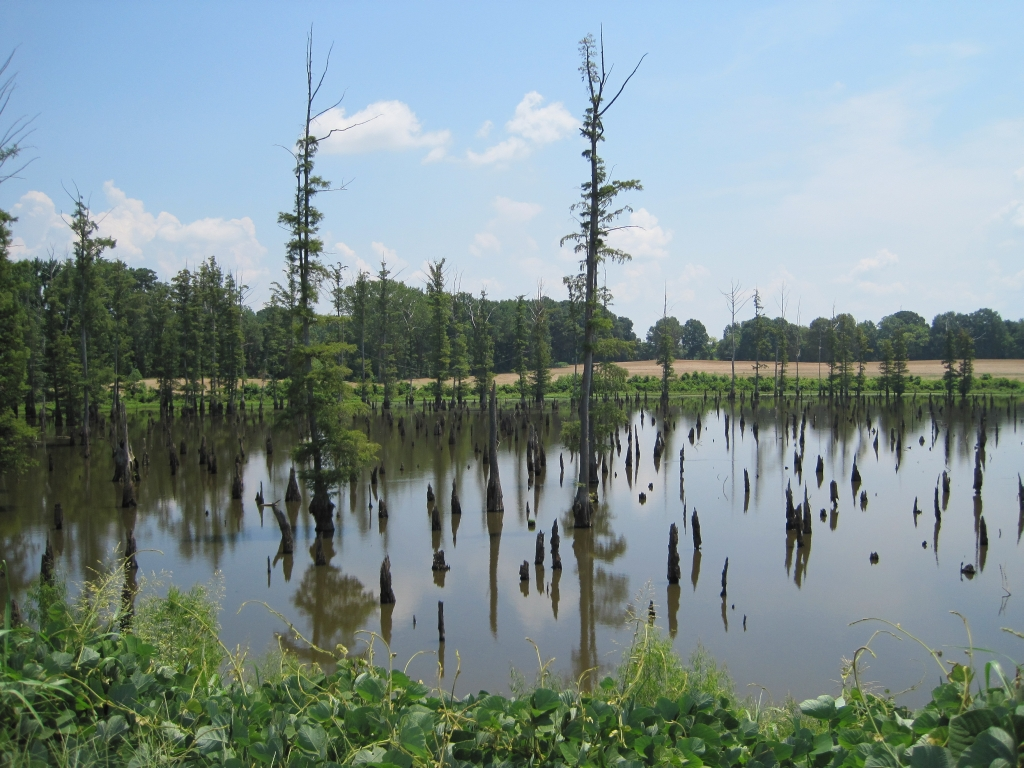
Firestone Park in Frayser

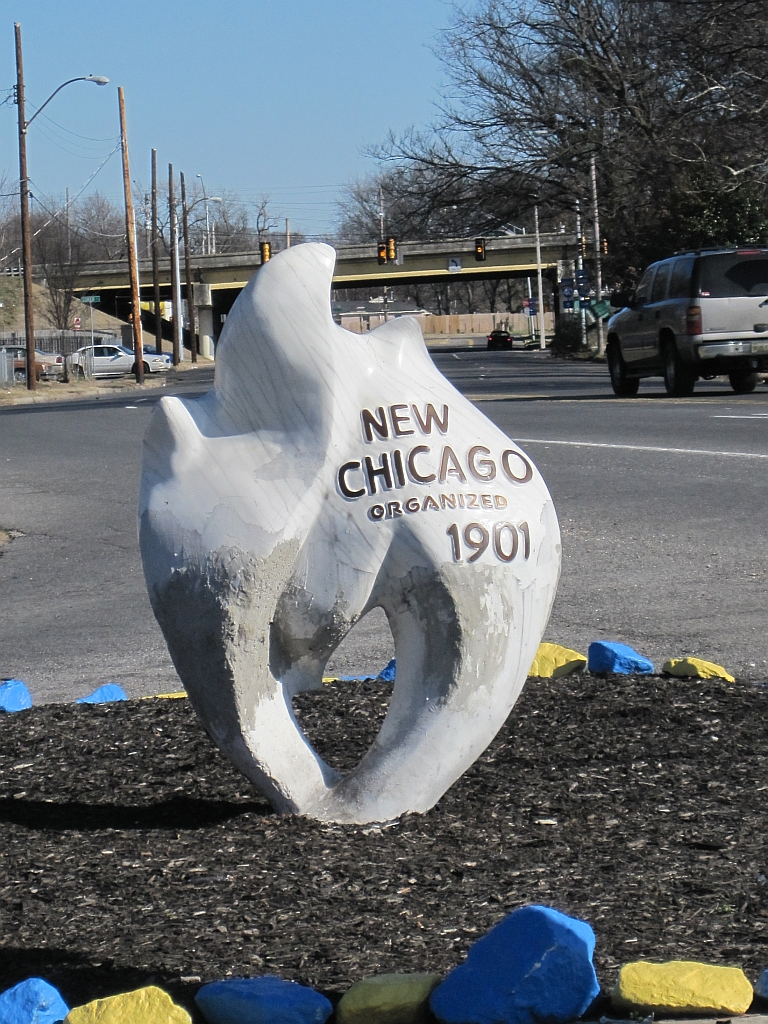
New Chicago

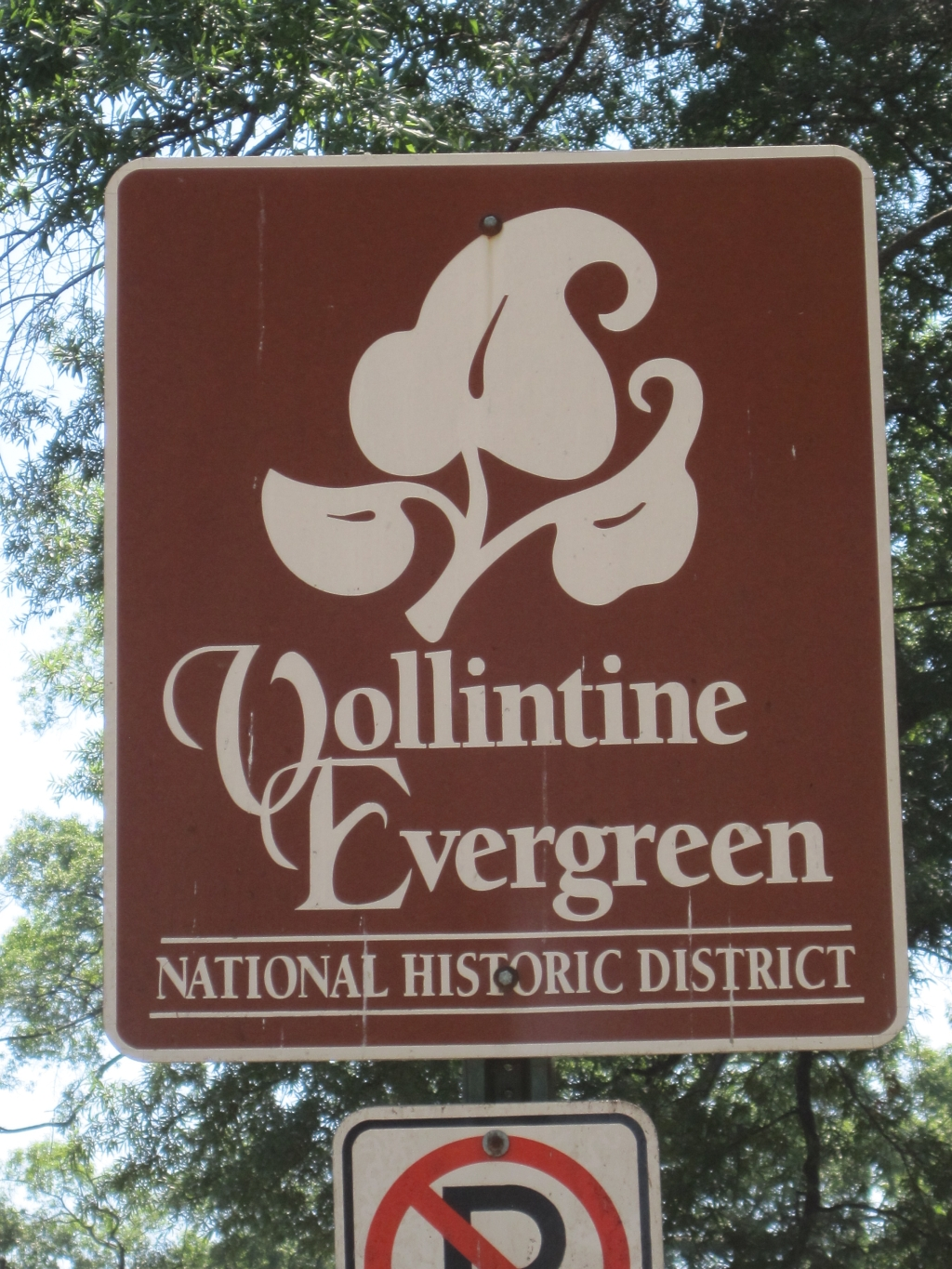
Vollintine Evergreen

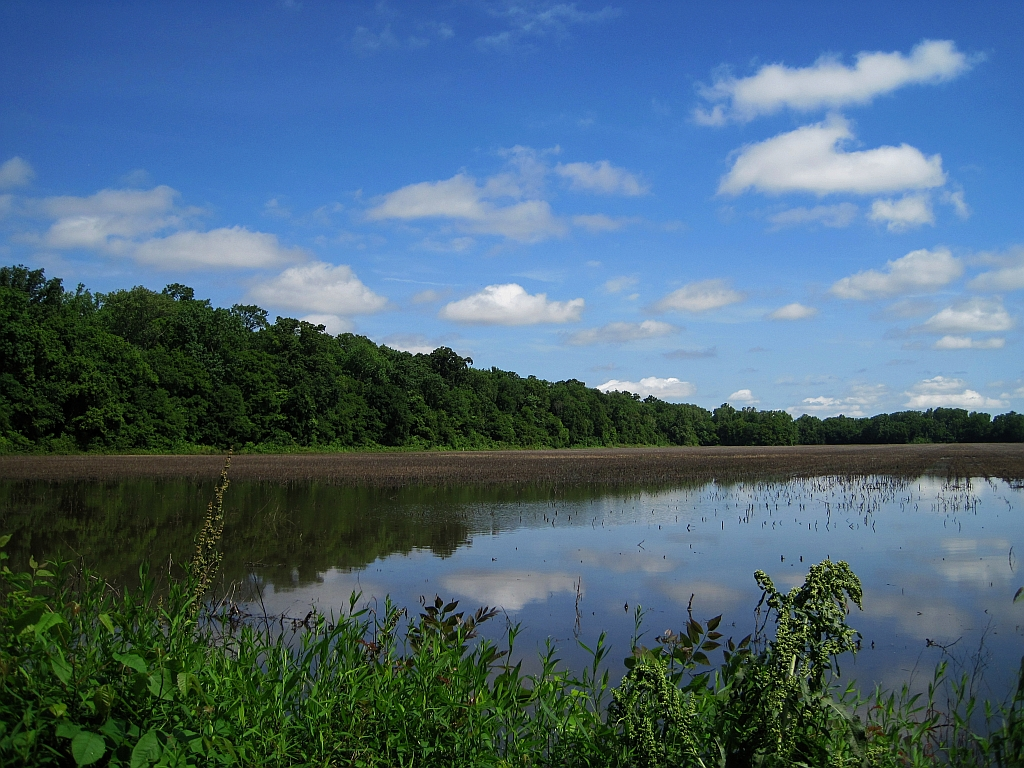
Shelby Forest
