= James H. Robinson =

James H. Robinson may refer to:

- James H. Robinson (soldier) (died 1864), American Union Army soldier
- James Harvey Robinson (1863–1936), American historian
- James Herman Robinson (1907–1972), American clergyman and humanitarian
- Dr. J.H. Robinson, pseudonym of American popular fiction writer, Sylvanus Cobb Jr. (1823–1887)

== See also ==
- James Robinson (disambiguation)
