= Hyde Park, Memphis =

Neighborhood of Memphis, Tennessee

Coordinates: 35.1815°N 89.9755°W

Hyde Park (also known as Pocket Town) is a neighborhood in the Hollywood community on the north of Memphis, Tennessee.

== Geography ==
Hyde Park is located on the north side of Memphis, Tennessee, starting around the intersection of Hyde Park St. and Chelsea Ave. Hyde Park lies near the Hollywood community and borders another North Memphis neighborhood known as Douglass.

== Community ==
The long stretch of Hollywood Street that runs through Hyde Park is renowned for being a popular gathering spot. On Hollywood Street or Chelsea Avenue, the majority of the local businesses are situated.

== Education ==
=== Shannon Elementary School ===
Shannon Elementary School, located at 2248 Shannon Road, is the only elementary school within the perimeters of Hyde Park. The school serves grades PK-5 formerly in the Memphis City Schools district and was a Shelby County Schools campus. In 2014, the school was used as a charter school known as KIPP.

=== Cypress Middle School ===
Cypress Middle School, located at 2109 Howell Street, was the only middle school in Hyde Park and still is today. The school is formerly operated by the Memphis City Schools and was a campus school in the Shelby County Schools before submitting its charter to KIPP. The school serves about 450 students in grades 6–8. After the 2013–14 school year, the Memphis City Board of Education decided to close Cypress Middle down. The former Cypress building is used for Kipp Academy.

=== Douglass & Manassas High Schools ===
There are no high schools located within Hyde Park. Students attend neighboring Douglass High School and Manassas High School.

Douglass is named after the 19th Century African-American abolitionist Frederick Douglass. The school opened in 1946, and boasts several graduating scholars, a world-renowned band and championship sports teams. The court-ordered cross-town busing of the 1970s, and low enrollment, led to the school closing in 1981. The abandoned building was added to the National Register of Historic Places in 1998, but was torn down in 2006 to be replaced by a new building. The new building was started in 2006 and the new Douglass High School opened to students in fall 2008. In May 2010, the school had its first graduating class since 1981. DHS has an active alumni association with more than 500 members in seven chapters across the United States.

Rev. William Young established Manassas in 1899. The original Manassas building was a two-room frame structure erected on the west side of Manassas Street, north of Belt Line. In 1909, Mrs. Cora Taylor was appointed principal. Under her leadership, Manassas purchased a tract of land located across the street. In 1921, a two-story frame building was added. A high school grade was added every year until Manassas graduated its first class of 14 members in 1924. Manassas was the first four-year accredited Negro high School in Shelby County. It had the first Negro football team in the city. The success of athletic teams of Manassas can be seen in the trophies on display in the trophy case in the hall near the Main Office. An auditorium with twelve hundred seats was completed in 1924 and a new 50-room modern structure added to the auditorium in 1938. Mr. Louis B. Hobson became the new principal after Mr. Hayes retired in 1953. Mr. Hobson fostered many outstanding educational programs during his 25 years of service with the belief that all students had the ability to obtain greatness. Manassas was further recognized for its students’ superior academic achievements in Mr. Hobson's administration. The integration of the faculty and student body in Manassas happened around 1974. Mr. Robert S., a young enthusiastic educator, become principal of Manassas High School in 1982. Mr. White accomplished many innovations for Manassas: French was added to the curriculum; advanced courses were added in math and science; Four computer labs were established; Manassas was paired with Trezevant Vocational School in an effort to improve vocational offering. During 1996 and 2001 the staff adopted three schoolwide programs: The Instructional Reform Models, The Middle School Initiative, The Ninth Grade Academy, and High Schools That Work involved all students in a challenging curriculum designed to improve student performance. Manassas changed from a middle/high school to a full-fledged high school with grades nine through twelve during 2001–2002. A vote by the entire Memphis City School Board of Commissioners approved construction of a new school in 2004 and the official groundbreaking ceremony was held on Dec. 13, 2005. The new school officially opened on Jan.7, 2008 on Manassas Street, where it originated in 1899. An Alumni Archive and a library are located in the new school.

=== Hyde Park Elementary School ===
Hyde Park Elementary School was one of the oldest schools in the Hyde Park community operated by the Memphis City Schools. The school was located on Tunica Street. In the 1970s many African American students were bussed out of the Hyde Park Neighborhood and attended Hollywood Elementary. The city school system closed Hyde Park School after a four-year period of desegregation bussing and enrollment with white students. After school closure the building was used for a service center. During within the mid-late 1980s, the school building was demolished and the newly Cypress Middle School was under construction at the time.

== Parks ==
There are many parks in the Hyde Park Community. They are listed as follows:

Gooch Park is located on University Street and Hunter Avenue. It is a 10-acre (40,000 m^{2}) plot of land donated to the community by Cecil Milton Gooch (1889-1969), a retired lumber company owner during that time. The park is also named after Gooch, and it was dedicated to him on November 24, 1957. Gooch Park was also the location of the first African American bicycle derby in Memphis. Today, Gooch Park has a swimming pool, pavilion, three outdoor basketball courts, and play equipment.

Guthrie Park is located on Chelsea Avenue and Decatur Street. Located on this park is Guthrie Elementary School, which was founded in 1915. Near this park is also the Dave Wells Community Center. One of the most notable people to visit the center was Elvis Presley, who played football with some friends there on December 27, 1956.

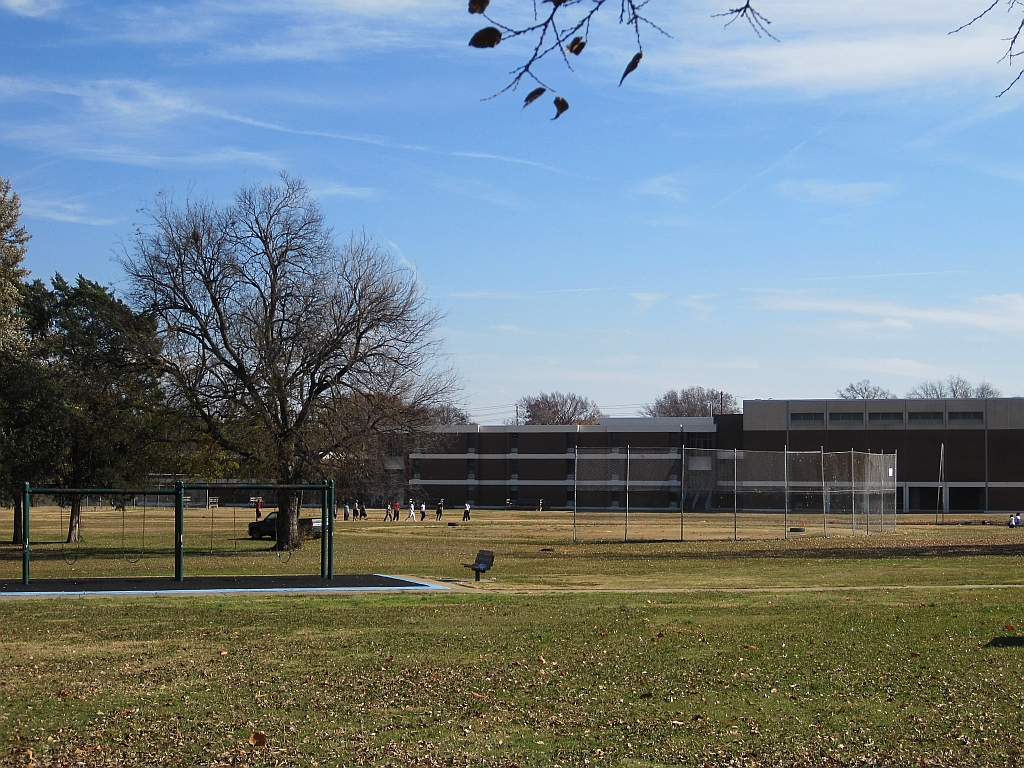
University Park, 2012

University Park is located on University Street and Edward Avenue, approximately two blocks away from Gooch Park. University Park is behind Cypress Middle School. It is 10 acres (40,000 m^{2}) and includes play equipment, four tennis courts, and a ball field.

Hollywood Park is located at 1560 N. Hollywood. It is 4.11 acres (16,600 m^{2}) and includes an indoor basketball court, play equipment, and a ball field. The Hollywood Community Center is also located there.

== Cypress Creek ==
Cypress Creek is a small creek running through North Memphis, originating east of the Memphis fairgrounds and running north until emptying into the Wolf River. It is an important asset for water drainage and flood control. It has also been the dumping sites of several harmful chemicals. Velsicol was the main target of the court cases involving Cyprus Creek and according to them site investigations and remediation have been completed at all residential areas along the street, with the exception of Springdale Apartments.

During the channelization process in the 1960s, contaminated sediment was displaced into residents’ backyards and placed on the grounds of local schools. In March 2005, the Tennessee Department of Health conducted tests requested by the Memphis and Shelby County Health Department to examine the levels of toxicity in the creek and the exposure and risk to those living around it. Velsicol Chemical Corporation took its own soil samples and discovered instances of the pesticide aldrin, dieldrin, endrin, and endrin-like chemicals, all of which were produced at the Velsicol plant. However, while Tennessee Department of Health concluded that pesticides in most yards were not hazardous to residents’ health, they also found that in some yards pesticides may have presented a health hazard in the past and may continue to be in the present and future.

The Tennessee Department of Health has recommended that the appropriate government bodies assure the swift cleanup of properties requiring remediation, and that all areas filled with soil from Cypress Creek should be located and tested. In addition, Velsicol is responsible for removing soil from contaminated residential properties, landscaping the property under the guidance of the property owner, and storing the contaminated soil on the Velsicol property before it can be disposed of. Once this process is complete, Velsicol must address non-residential properties adversely affected by the company's dumping.

On April 1, 2004, certain residents of the Cypress Creek neighborhood of Memphis filed a lawsuit against Velsicol Chemical Corporation, alleging damage to their property from the discharge of dieldrin and related chemicals from the Velsicol plant on Warford Avenue to Cypress Creek. Mildred Isabel et al. v. Velsicol Chemical Corporation. The Creek has also been rumored to cause birth defects in the babies of parents living near the creek, and this was one of the arguments that the plaintiffs had against Velsicol. After investigation, it was determined that this was not the case, though cancer rates are still higher in the neighborhood.

== Community centers ==
There are a few locations in Hyde Park that are central to the community. There is the Shasta Community Center, Hollywood Community Center, as well as the Hollywood Library. The Hollywood Community Center contains a weight-lifting room, a gymnasium, and meeting and multi-purpose rooms. The center offers several classes, some of which are: fitness, youth basketball, educational development, GED programs, dance and music, as well as many more cultural, physical, and mental development programs and activities. It is open Monday through Saturday and is a vital location in the community, especially for the youth and seniors.

Next door to the community center is the Hollywood branch of the Memphis Public Library system. Along with over 23,000 printed materials, they are also working on their collection of audio and video files for the community to enjoy. Along with these assets, the library offers computers with access to internet and word processing, a job and career center, meeting room, and special event programming.

=== Shasta Central ===
Shasta Central is a community center located in the heart of Hyde Park at 2375 Shasta Avenue, a few blocks away from Cypress Creek and Cypress Middle School. Opened in March 2005 by a partnership between Rhodes College and Dorothy Cox, an active member of the community, employee of Rhodes, and director of the center, Shasta Central stands as a symbol of hopeful progress within the community and an extension of Ms. Cox's non-profit, Community Mentoring Outreach Services, Inc. Ms. Cox's mission of hope and confidence, of discovering, utilizing, and enhancing community assets as well as holding residents and government accountable for their equal share of responsibility, is reflected in the efforts and successes implemented by Shasta Central. According to an article published by Rhodes Magazine, several changes have occurred in Hyde Park because of Shasta Central's involvement.
