= Douglass, Memphis, Tennessee =

Neighborhood of Memphis, Tennessee

Coordinates: 35.1757°N 89.9595°W

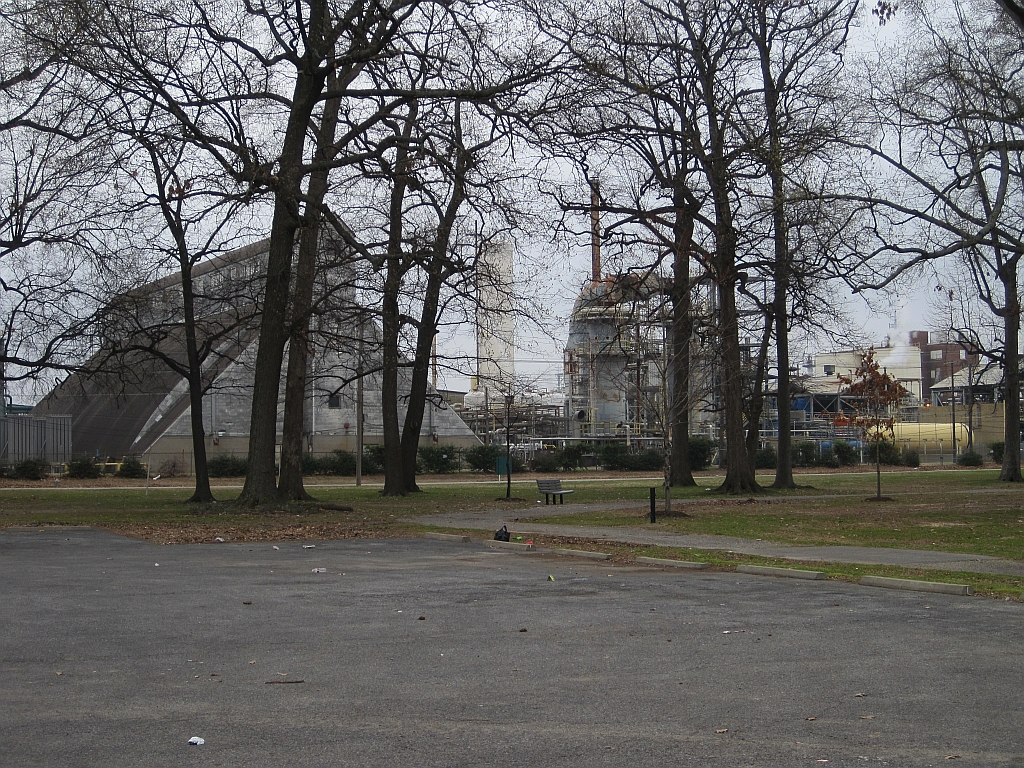
A Penn A Kem chemical facility adjacent to Douglass Park

Douglass is a community on the north side of Memphis, Tennessee. Douglass was named after Frederick Douglass, who was admired by William Rush-Plummer, the one-time owner of the land (approximately 40 acres (0.16 km^{2})) where the Douglass neighborhood currently stands. Douglass was the first community in north Memphis.

Douglass borders Hyde Park and Hollywood and is surrounded by railroad tracks to the north, south and west. South of Douglass is the neighborhood of Binghampton, to the southeast is Nutbush.

Schools in the neighborhood include Douglass High School, which opened in 1946, closed in 1981, then reopened in 2008, and Douglass Elementary School, next door to the Douglass Community Center.
