= Laura Dukes =

American singer

Laura Ella Dukes (June 10, 1907 – October 10 or 14, 1992), (Note: Her gravestone gives 10 October 1992 as the date of her death, but some other sources including the US Social Security Death Index give 14 October.) sometimes credited as Little Laura Dukes, was an American blues singer, dancer, and mandolin, banjo and ukulele player. She performed and recorded in Memphis, Tennessee, from the 1920s to the 1980s.

== Life ==
She was born Laura Ella Smith in North Memphis, where her father had been a drummer in W. C. Handy's band. He took her as a young child to theaters and taverns, where she began performing and later worked as a singer and dancer. She was often billed as "Little Laura" or "Little Bit", an allusion to her 4'7" height. She met blues singer Robert McCollum, later known as Robert Nighthawk, in 1933, and began appearing with him as a duo. After initially learning guitar, she later took up the banjo, ukulele and mandolin.

She first recorded in 1934, playing mandolin on recordings made in Chicago by the Memphis Jug Band, featuring Will Shade, for OKeh Records. She also made recordings in the early 1950s with the Will Batts band, which were released some twenty years later, and performed with the Batts band intermittently. Later in the 1950s, she recorded several tracks with Shade and Gus Cannon, and in 1972 — as Little Laura Dukes — she recorded tracks that were first released on the Italian albums, Blues Oggi and Tennessee Blues Vol.1.

From the late 1950s, she mainly performed in Dixieland groups at parties and festivals, becoming a favorite with white audiences in Memphis. In 1976 she appeared in a BBC television series, The Devil's Music, and continued to perform in clubs in Memphis in the 1980s.

She died in 1992 at the age of 85.
