= John Kemp Mizner =

US Army brigadier general (1834–1898)

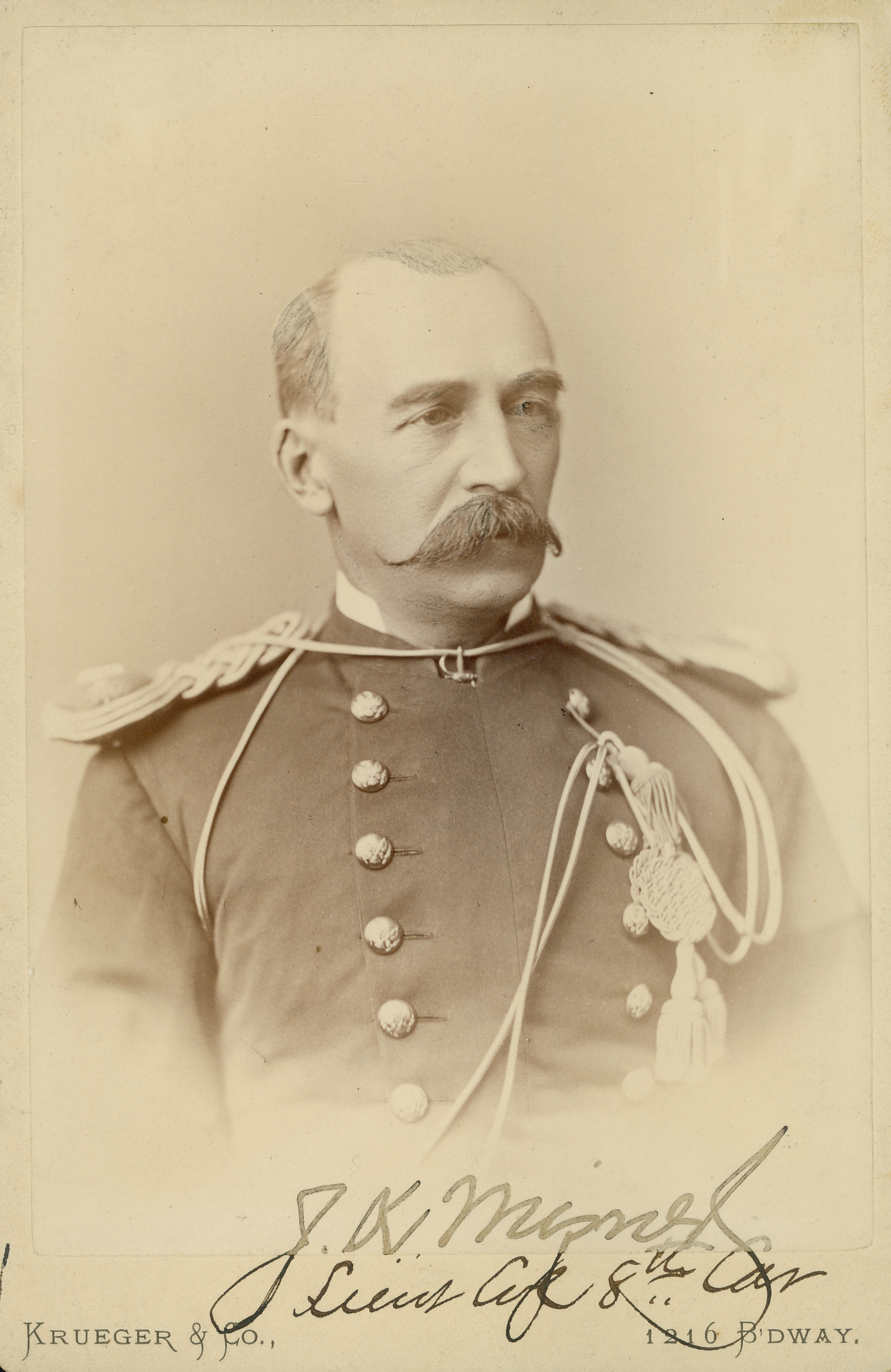
- Mizner c. 1880
- Born: 2 March 1834; Geneva, New York, US
- Died: 8 September 1898 (aged 64); Washington, D.C., US
- Burial place: Arlington National Cemetery
- Alma mater: United States Military Academy
- Spouse(s): Emily Stephens (m. 1860–1896) Julia Rowland Richards (m. 1896–1898)
- Children: 1
- Relatives: Lansing B. Mizner (cousin); Addison Mizner (cousin); Wilson Mizner (cousin)
- Military career
- Allegiance: United States; Union (American Civil War)
- Service: United States Army; Union Army
- Service years: 1856–1861, 1866–1897 (US Army); 1861–1866 (Union Army)
- Rank: Brigadier General
- Unit: US Army Cavalry Branch
- Commands: 3rd Michigan Cavalry Regiment; 2nd Brigade, Cavalry Division, Army of the Mississippi; Cavalry Division, Army of the Mississippi; Chief of Cavalry, District of Jackson; Chief of Cavalry, Left Wing, XVI Army Corps; Cavalry Brigade, 2nd Division, Left Wing, XVI Army Corps; Post at Huntersville; Cavalry Brigade, Military Division of the Gulf; Post of San Antonio; Sub-District of San Antonio; Central District of Texas; Fort Sill; Fort Bayard; Fort Craig; Fort Huachuca; Jefferson Barracks Recruiting Depot; Fort Brown; Fort Concho; 8th Cavalry Regiment; Fort Meade, Dakota Territory; 10th Cavalry Regiment; Fort Grant; U.S. Army Recruiting Service; Fort Assinniboine; Department of Dakota
- Wars: American Civil War; American Indian Wars

John Kemp Mizner (2 March 1834 – 8 September 1898) was a career officer in the United States Army. A Union Army veteran of the American Civil War and a participant in the American Indian Wars, Mizner served from 1856 to 1897 and attained the rank of brigadier general.

Mizner was a native of Geneva, New York and was raised and educated in Detroit. He attended the United States Military Academy at West Point from 1852 to 1856, then was assigned to the 2nd Regiment of Dragoons. He attended the Carlisle Barracks Cavalry School until 1857, then served at posts including Fort Leavenworth during the federal response to the Bleeding Kansas controversy. During 1860 and 1861, he served in Utah, Wyoming, and Dakota Territory, where he performed American Indian Wars frontier duty and took part in scouring expeditions.

During the American Civil War, Mizner commanded the 3rd Michigan Cavalry Regiment and later commanded Cavalry brigades, as well as the Cavalry units of several divisions and departments. Battles in which he participated included the Siege of Corinth, Battle of Iuka, and Second Battle of Corinth. After the war, he served on Reconstruction duty in Louisiana and Texas. He went on to serve at posts throughout the western states during the American Indian Wars, including Nebraska, New Mexico, and Texas. In May 1897, Mizner was promoted to brigadier general. He then requested retirement under a law that permitted officers with 40 years of service to request retirement before reaching the mandatory retirement age of 64. His request was approved, and he left the army in June 1897. During his brief retirement, Mizner resided in Washington, DC. He died in Washington on 8 September 1898 and was buried at Arlington National Cemetery.

== Early life ==
John Kemp Mizner (frequently J. Kemp Mizner or J. K. Mizner) was born in Geneva, New York on 2 March 1834, a son of Lansing B. Misner (1794–1866) and Mary Gouverneur (Rutgers) Mizner (1799–1857). Mizner's siblings included Henry Rutgers Mizner (1897–1915), who also served as a brigadier general in the U.S. Army. Among their relatives was first cousin Lansing B. Mizner (1825–1893), the son of his father's brother Henry C. Mizner. (Note: The family line for John Kemp Mizner was Lansing B. Mizner (d. 1866) (father) to Lawrence Mizner (d. 1795) (grandfather). For Lansing B. Mizner (d. 1893) it was Henry Caldwell Mizner (d. 1829) (father) to Lawrence Mizner (d. 1795) (grandfather).) Architect Addison Mizner and playwright Wilson Mizner were first cousins once removed of John Kemp Mizner. (Note: John Kemp Mizner's grandfather Lawrence was Addison and Wilson Mizner's great-grandfather. For Addison and Wilson Mizner, the family line was Lansing B. Mizner (d. 1893) (father) to Henry Caldwell Mizner (d. 1829) (grandfather) to Lawrence Mizner (d. 1795) (great-grandfather).)

Mizner was raised and educated in Detroit, and in 1852 was appointed to the United States Military Academy (West Point) by Congressman Ebenezer Penniman. He graduated in 1856 ranked 33rd of 49. Among his classmates who achieved prominence during the American Civil War and the 40 years afterward were Miles D. McAlester, Orlando Metcalfe Poe, Francis Laurens Vinton, George Dashiell Bayard, Thomas Crook Sullivan, Guilford Dudley Bailey, Hylan B. Lyon, Lunsford L. Lomax, James Patrick Major, James W. Forsyth, William Hicks Jackson, William P. Sanders, Samuel S. Carroll, and Fitzhugh Lee.

== Early career ==
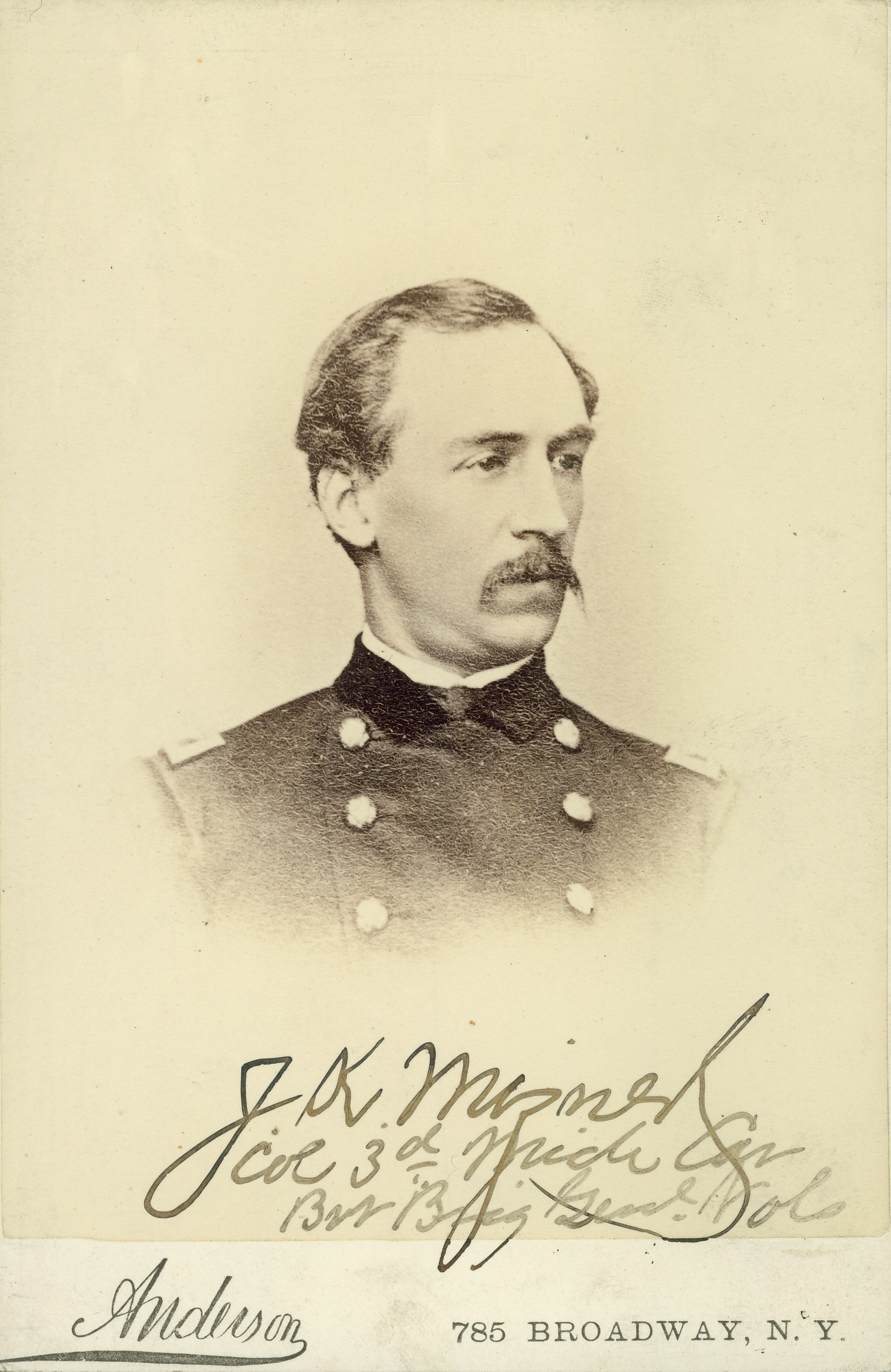
Mizner as commander of the 3rd Michigan Cavalry during the Civil War

In July 1856, Mizner was commissioned as a second lieutenant of Cavalry and assigned to the Cavalry School at Carlisle Barracks, Pennsylvania. After completing the course, in February 1857 he was assigned to the 2nd Regiment of Dragoons and posted to Fort Leavenworth, Kansas, where he took part in the U.S. response to violence that occurred during the Bleeding Kansas controversy prior to the start of the American Civil War. He was assigned to Fort Laramie, Dakota Territory from 1858 to 1861, including American Indian Wars scouting expeditions in 1859. He was promoted to first lieutenant in May 1861.

In November 1861, Mizner was assigned to Union Army duty during the American Civil War. He served in the Defenses of Washington and received promotion to captain in November 1861. In March 1862, he was assigned to the United States Volunteers and promoted to temporary colonel as commander of the 3rd Michigan Cavalry Regiment. Mizner led his regiment in Mississippi during the Battle of Island Number Ten, and continued to serve in the Mississippi campaign, including the Battle of Iuka, Second Battle of Corinth, and Battle of Coffeeville. During this campaign, he frequently commanded either the 2nd Brigade of the Army of the Mississippi's Cavalry division or the Cavalry division itself. He served in the Mississippi campaign until the end of 1862 and received promotion to major by brevet in October 1862 to recognize his heroism at the Second Battle of Corinth.

In January 1863, Mizner was appointed chief of Cavalry for the District of Jackson, Mississippi, during which he took part in skirmishes near Brownsville on 14 January and Clinton on 20 February. From May to September 1863, he was assigned as chief of Cavalry for the Left Wing of the XVI Army Corps. He took part in several engagements in northern Mississippi and received brevet promotion to lieutenant colonel in June 1863 to recognize his commendable conduct during fighting in Panola County. From September 1863 to January 1864, Mizner commanded the Cavalry brigade of the Left Wing's 2nd Division, during which he took part in the capture of Grenada and a skirmish at Wyatt's Ford in Lafayette County. In March 1864 he resumed command of the 3rd Michigan Cavalry as it performed provost guard duty in St. Louis until May. From May 1864 to March 1865, he commanded the regiment and the post at Huntersville, Arkansas (now North Little Rock). From March to April 1865, Mizner led his regiment in Alabama during the Mobile campaign. After the Civil War, he was promoted to brigadier general of Volunteers by brevet as of March 1865 to recognize the commendable service he rendered throughout the conflict.

=== Family ===
In September 1860, Mizner married Emily Stephens in Detroit. They were the parents of a son, John Stephens Mizner. Emily Stephens Mizner died in March 1896 and later that year Mizner married Julia Rowland Richards. They were married until his death.

== Continued career ==
At the start of the post-Civil War Reconstruction era, Mizner commanded the Cavalry brigade of the Military Division of the Gulf during occupation duty in Shreveport, Louisiana and San Antonio, Texas. From September to November 1865, he commanded the Post of San Antonio. He served as acting assistant inspector general on the Staff of Wesley Merritt, the Military Division of the Gulf's chief of Cavalry, from November to December 1865, then assumed command of the Sub-District of San Antonio, where he remained until February 1866. He was then assigned to command the Central District of Texas. Mizner was mustered out of the U.S. Volunteers on 12 February 1866 and was on an extended post-war leave of absence from March to June.

Mizner was posted to frontier duty at Fort McPherson, Nebraska from June 1866 to May 1869, including an extended leave of absence from December 1867 to August 1868. In January 1869, he was promoted to major and assigned to the 4th Cavalry Regiment. He served at Corpus Christi, Texas from June 1869 to May 1870, and in Austin, Texas from June 14, 1870, to April 1871. Mizner was assigned to Fort Richardson, Texas from May 1871 to October 1872. After another leave of absence, he was assigned to Fort Clark, Texas from April to September 1873. From September 1873 to May 1874, he was on temporary duty purchasing horses in San Antonio.

== Later career ==
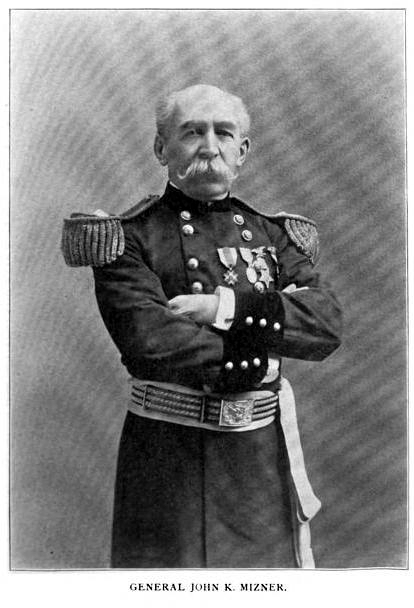
Mizner as a brigadier general in 1897

Mizner served at Fort McKavett, Texas from May 1874 to February 1875. He was then posted to again to Fort Richardson where he remained from March to May 1875. From May 1875 to April 1876 he was on duty at Fort Sill, Indian Territory and he was assigned to Fort Reno, Indian Territory from April 1876 to April 1880. He commanded the post at Fort Sill from April 1880 to December 1882, then was assigned to command Fort Bayard, New Mexico until February 1884. He commanded Fort Craig, New Mexico from February to June 1884, which was followed by command of Fort Huachuca, Arizona from June to December 1884. Mizner commanded the Jefferson Barracks Recruiting Depot in Missouri from October 1884 to October 1886. He was promoted to lieutenant colonel of the 8th Cavalry Regiment in January 1886.

From December 1886 to August 1887, Mizner commanded the post at Fort Brown, Texas and he commanded Fort Concho, Texas from September 1887 to June 1888. He commanded Fort Meade, Dakota Territory from June 1888 to March 1890. In April 1890, he was promoted to colonel and assigned to command the 10th Cavalry Regiment. After an extended leave of absence from March to August 1890, during which he traveled extensively in Europe, he commanded the 10th Cavalry and Fort Apache, Arizona from August to September 1890. He commanded the regiment and Fort Grant, Arizona from September 1890 to April 1892.

Mizner served in Washington, D.C. from April 1892 to February 1893 as president of the examining board that considered Cavalry officers for retention in the army and promotion. From February 1893 to October 1894, he was superintendent of the U.S. Army Recruiting Service and stationed in New York City. He commanded the 10th Cavalry and the post of Fort Assinniboine, Montana from October 1894 to 1 June 1897. From September to October 1896 he also commanded the Department of Dakota. In May 1897, Mizner was promoted to brigadier general. He then requested retirement, in accordance with a law that permitted army officers with 40 years of service to request retirement prior to reaching the mandatory retirement age of 64. His request was approved, and he left the army on 7 June 1897. In retirement, Mizner resided in Washington, D.C. He died in Washington on 8 September 1898 and was buried at Arlington National Cemetery.

== Dates of rank ==
Mizner's dates of rank were:

- Second Lieutenant, 1 July 1856
- First Lieutenant, 9 May 1861
- Captain, 12 November 1861
- Colonel (United States Volunteers), 7 March 1862
- Major (Brevet), 4 October 1862
- Lieutenant Colonel (Brevet), 12 June 1863
- Brigadier General (Brevet) (United States Volunteers), 13 March 1865
- Captain, 12 February 1866
- Major, 26 January 1869
- Lieutenant Colonel, 9 January 1866
- Colonel, 15 April 1890
- Brigadier General, 26 May 1897
- Brigadier General (Retired), 7 June 1897
