= Douglass High School (Memphis, Tennessee) =

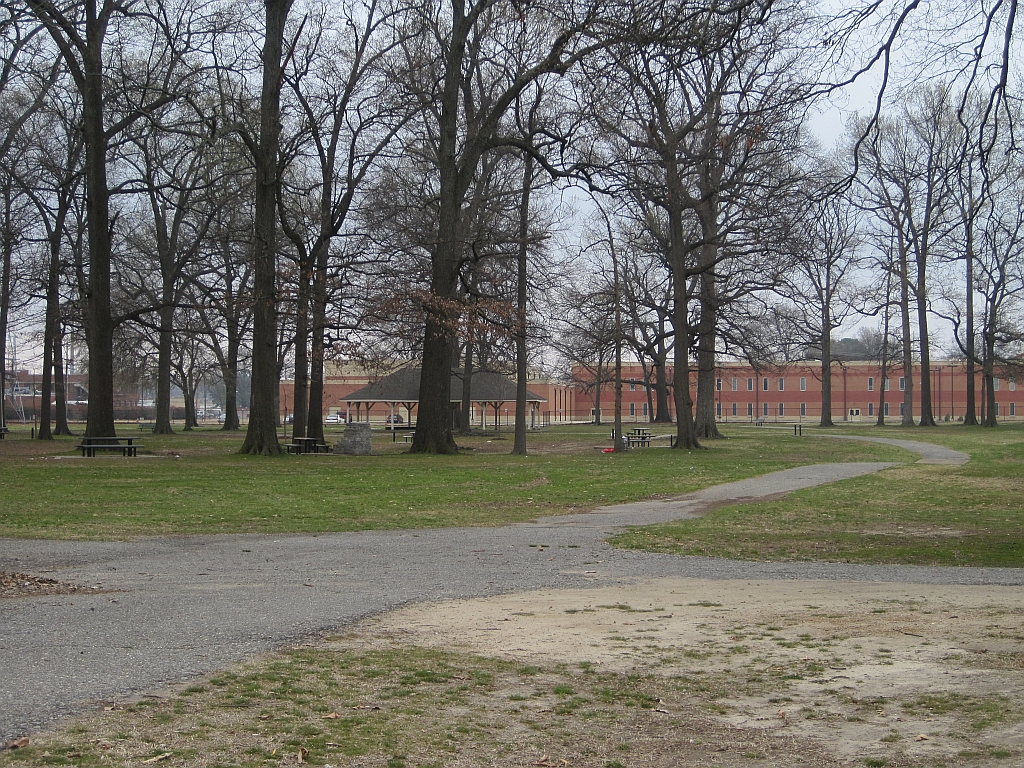
- Douglass High School viewed from nearby Douglass Park
- Memphis, Tenn. United States

Information
- Type: Public
- Established: 1938, rebuilt in 1946, closed in 1981, reopened in 2008
- School district: Memphis-Shelby County Schools
- Principal: John S. Bush
- Colors: Maroon and white
- Mascot: Red Devils
- Website: https://schools.scsk12.org/frederickdouglass-hs
- Douglass High School
- Formerly listed on the U.S. National Register of Historic Places
- U.S. National Historic Landmark
- Location within Tennessee Location within the United States
- Location: 3200 Mount Olive Rd; Memphis, Tennessee
- Coordinates: 35°10′32″N 89°57′6″W
- NRHP reference No.: 98000241

Significant dates
- Added to NRHP: March 12, 1998
- Removed from NRHP: November 9, 2007

Douglass High School is a public high school (grades 9-12) in Memphis, United States, Tennessee, operated in the Memphis-Shelby County Schools. Located in the African American Douglass neighborhood in North Memphis, it is named for Frederick Douglass, a 19th-century abolitionist.

== History ==
The original Douglass High School was built in 1938. It burned to the ground and was replaced by a new building in 1946.

The school opened in 1946 in the Shelby County Schools district and operated in the original Frederick Douglass High School building until 1981 when it closed. Closure occurred after cross-town busing for desegregation caused enrollment to plummet as African American students were bused out of the neighborhood, but few white students reciprocated by attending Douglass. Subsequently, the school district used the building for storage, and it fell into a state of disrepair. The building was added to the National Register of Historic Places in 1998, but was torn down in 2006 to be replaced by a new building.

The current building was started in 2006 and the new Douglass High School opened to students in fall 2008. The new Douglass School opened for the 2008-09 school year, with expected enrollment of at least 800 students. The mascot is the Red Devil and colors are maroon, red and white.

== Alumni ==
Douglass High School has an active alumni association with more than 500 members in seven chapters across the United States. The association raises funds for scholarships and other purposes, and its member alumni lobbied public officials to reopen the school. A parade was held to commemorate the demolition of the building.
