= 3rd Michigan Cavalry Regiment =

- Michigan state flag
- Active: August 24, 1861, to March 15, 1866
- Country: United States
- Allegiance: Union
- Branch: Cavalry
- Engagements: Island No. 10; Battle of Corinth; Battle of Coffeeville; Battle of Franklin; Nashville

The 3rd Michigan Cavalry Regiment was a cavalry regiment that served in the Union Army during the American Civil War.

== Service ==
The 3rd Michigan Cavalry was organized at Grand Rapids, Michigan, between August 24 and November 28, 1861.

=== Early service ===
Under the command of Lieutenant Colonel Robert H.G Minty, the regiment left Michigan on November 28, 1861, and moved to the Benton Barracks, where they were stationed until February 1862.

In February 1862, the regiment was attached to the Cavalry Division of the Army of the Mississippi, commanded by General John Pope. The regiment's first engagement was the Siege of Island No. 10. While they were encamped at New Madrid, the regiment suffered a high mortality rate due to disease from contaminated water. On March 7, 1862, Captain John K. Mizner was commissioned as the regiment's colonel and assumed command.

=== Campaigns in Mississippi and Tennessee ===
Following the surrender of Island No. 10, the 3rd Michigan Cavalry was transported via the Tennessee River to participate in the Siege of Corinth (April 29 - May 30, 1862), engaging is scouting and outpost duties, and would see action at Farmington in May.

Following the Confederate evacuation of Corinth, the regiment would take part in campaigns in Alabama and Mississippi. Notable engagements were:

- Battle of Iuka (September 19, 1862): Operating under the command of Captain Lyman G. Wilcox (Minzer was appointed Chief of Cavalry), the regiment were engaged against Confederate forces on the Tuscumbia Road.
- Second Battle of Corinth (October 3-4, 1862): The regiment actively pursued the retreating Confederates for 75 miles into Central Mississippi, engaging in skirmishes and the capture of Confederate prisoners.

During the Remainder of 1862, the regiment was engaged at Hudsonville, Holly Springs, Lumpkin's Mill, Oxford and Coffeeville. In November, during the Vicksburg Campaign, Confederate forces severed communications between Grant at La Grange, Tennessee, and Sherman at Memphis, Company K, under Captain Cicero Newell, bypassed heavy Confederate pickets by making a 17-mile night march, after attacking pickets at Somerville and crossing the Wolf River, the detachment successfully restored contact with Sherman's headquarters.

In early 1863, the regiment was engaged at Brownsville in January and Clifton, Tennessee in February. At Clifton, Captain Newell and 60 men from Company K executed a night crossing on the Tennessee River via flat-bottomed boats, surprising Confederate Colonel Newsom and capturing him, alongside four lieutenants and 61 enlisted men, and with their horses and equipment.

Throughout 1863, the regiment took part in anti-guerilla operations and cavalry engagements in northern Mississippi and western Tennessee, seeing action at Jackson and Panola in July. In August 1863, the regiment led an advance on Grenada, Mississippi, capturing the town and destroying significant Confederate Railroad assets, including 60 locomotives and 400 railroad cars.

Private James H. Robinson of Company B would later be awarded the Medal of Honor for his bravery at a fight at Brownsville, Arkansas, on January 27, 1864.

The regiment was mustered out of service on March 15, 1866.

== Total strength and casualties ==
The regiment suffered 3 officers and 27 enlisted men killed in action or mortally wounded and 4 officers and 380 enlisted men who died of disease, for a total of 414 fatalities.

== Commanders ==
- Colonel John Kemp Mizner

== See also ==
- List of Michigan Civil War Units
- Michigan in the American Civil War
