= Memphis National Cemetery =

United States National Cemetery

Coordinates: 35°10′23″N 89°56′13″W

- U.S. National Register of Historic Places
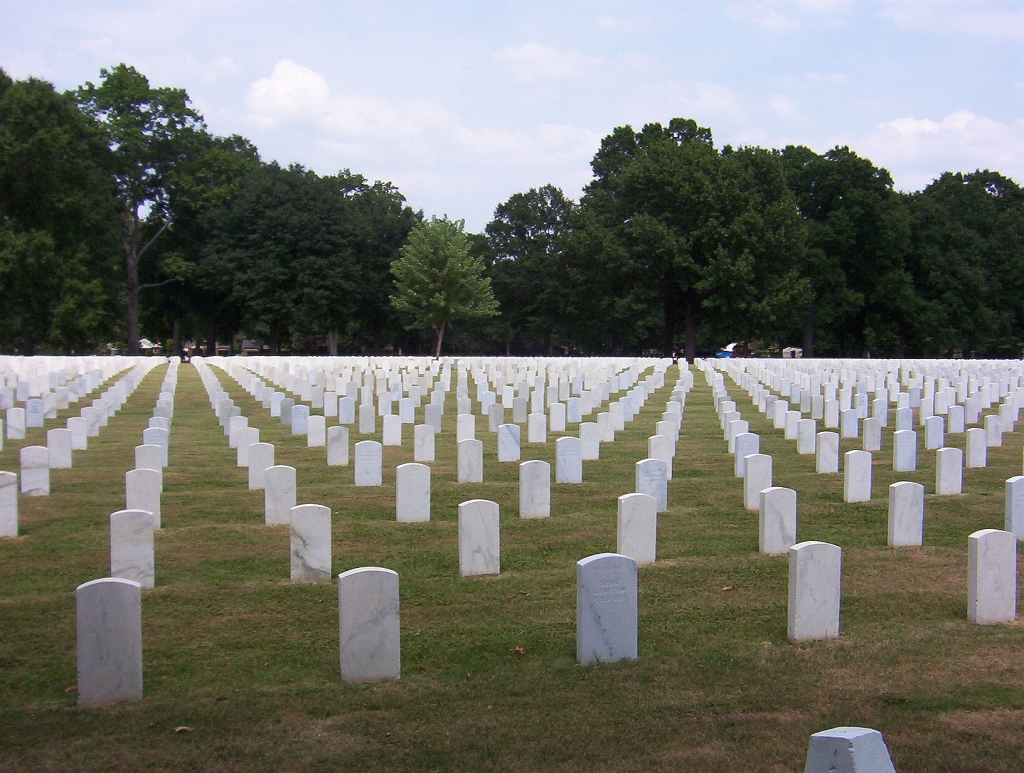
- National Cemetery in Memphis, Tennessee
- Location: 3568 Townes Ave; Memphis, Tennessee
- MPS: Civil War Era National Cemeteries MPS
- NRHP reference No.: 96001233
- Added to NRHP: October 10, 1996

Memphis National Cemetery is a United States National Cemetery located in the Nutbush neighborhood in northeast Memphis, Tennessee. Administered by the United States Department of Veterans Affairs, it encompasses 44.2 acres (17.9 ha), and as of the end of 2007, had 42,184 interments.

Several Civil War battlefield cemeteries were transferred to the Memphis National Cemetery after the war.

== History ==
The national cemetery at Memphis, Tennessee, was established in 1867. The cemetery, then comprising an area of 32.62 acres, was at that time about seven miles northeast of Memphis. The site for the cemetery was chosen by a board of officers consisting of Chaplain William R. Earnshaw, Brevet Lieutenant Colonel A.W. Wills, assistant quartermaster, and Brevet Major G.W. Marshall, assistant quartermaster, The first superintendent of the national cemetery at Memphis was John F. Carl, a discharged corporal of Company A, Fourth Regiment of Artillery, who was appointed on 6 August 1867. The 1869 report of Brevet Major General Lorenzo Thomas, Inspector of National Cemeteries, indicates that Superintendent Carl was attentive to his duties, and that he had the cemetery in good order.

Old records show that Memphis National Cemetery was originally established as the Mississippi River National Cemetery when the Union Army forces took control of Memphis during the American Civil War. This was a most appropriate designation in recognition of the fact that a very large number of the initial burials in the cemetery were the remains of members of the Union forces who participated in the battles and engagements during the early years of the war, which contributed to eventual control of the Mississippi River by the forces of the United States. Following the close of the war, reinterments were made in the national cemetery at Memphis from war time burial sites along the Mississippi from Hickham Kentucky to Helena Arkansas, including New Madrid, Island No. 10, and Fort Pillow.

In 1867, about 250 bodies of Union soldiers, some of whom were casualties of the Battle of Fort Pillow in Lauderdale County, were moved from a battlefield cemetery south of Fort Pillow to Memphis National Cemetery to be re-interred in a designated field.

The exigencies of war with the inevitable toll of wounded and sick necessitated the establishment of many military hospitals. The city of Memphis, once it had come under control of Union forces, furnished a convenient location for military hospitals to care for a portion of the wounded and sick from the Mississippi River area of combat. General hospitals capable of caring for 5,000 men were set up in and about the city. The more serious cases were sent to these hospitals in three river steamers assigned to the Medical Department as hospital transports. These hospitals, though better staffed and organized that some of the Civil War facilities, nonetheless had a high death rate among the wounded and ill committed to their care. The dead from these hospitals, initially interred in hospital and private cemeteries in the Memphis area, were subsequently reinterred in the Memphis National Cemetery after its establishment in 1867. After the war, several battlefield cemeteries were transferred to Memphis National Cemetery.

Visitors to Memphis National Cemetery will note several areas, especially in sections A, B, C, D, E, H, J, and K, wherein are government headstones and markers bearing no name. These are the graves of Civil War unknowns, some 8,866 in number, the second largest number of unknowns in any of the national cemeteries presently under the jurisdiction of the Department of Veterans Affaires. The existence of so large a number of interments of unknowns in a single cemetery may be attributed in large part to the fact that Memphis National Cemetery was not established until 1867, two years after the close of the Civil War. During the interval from the initial burial of these decedents to the time of reinterment, many of the crude wooden burial markers placed at the graves had been removed or destroyed through exposure to the elements. Further, as there was no mandatory use during the Civil War of any form of personal identification, such as the present day identification tags required to be worn at all times by military personnel, means of identification of disinterred remains were extremely limited. By 1870, three years after the date of its establishment, Memphis National Cemetery had become the burial site for the remains of some 13,965 Civil War decedents and was ranked 5th in number of interments among the 73 national cemeteries then under control of the War Department. Members of Civil War volunteer organizations from twenty-eight states of the United States, as well as members of the United States Army, the United States Navy, United States Colored Troops, and the Mississippi River Marine Brigade are interred within the boundaries of this cemetery. Some five hundred and thirty-seven Civil War regiments are represented among the honored dead interred here at Memphis National Cemetery.

Over the years since the establishment of Memphis National Cemetery, changes in national cemetery legislation and regulations have extended the categories of persons eligible for interment in national cemeteries. Memphis National Cemetery has been expanded and now comprises a total area of 44.15 acres. Within its boundaries honored burial has been accorded to those members of the Armed Forces who have participated in the Civil War, the Spanish–American War, World War I, World War II, the Korean War, and the war in Vietnam. As of November 2017, an approximate number of 46,000 interments had been made in this cemetery.

The flag of the United States is proudly flown at Memphis National Cemetery, honoring the lives and deeds of the known and the unknown, who over these many years, answered the call of duty in their nation's service. The Memphis National Cemetery is a closed National Cemetery and can only perform subsequent in-ground interments. The Cemetery does now have a Columbarium for the initial and subsequent interment of cremated remains of member of the Armed Forces of the United States whose last active service terminated honorably, and for their eligible dependents.

=== Steamboat Sultana disaster ===
On the night of April 26, 1865, the steamboat Sultana, overloaded with Union soldiers who had recently been liberated from Confederate POW camps, exploded due to a boiler rupture on the Mississippi River several miles north of Memphis. Many of the dead from that accident are buried in Memphis National Cemetery.

== Notable monuments ==
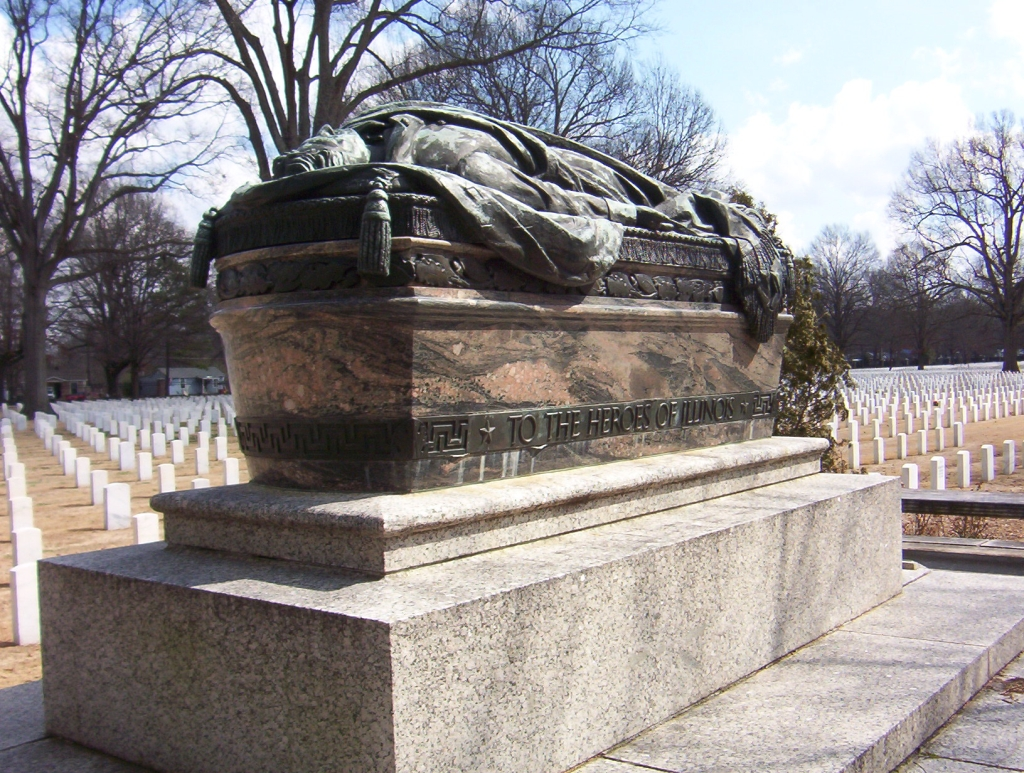
Heroes of Illinois Monument.

- The Illinois Monument, a granite and bronze sarcophagus by sculptor Leon Hermant, dedicated in 1929.
- The Minnesota Monument, a granite monument erected in 1916.

== Notable interments ==
- Medal of Honor recipients
  - Private James H. Robinson (?–1864), for action during the Civil War, interred in Section H, Grave 4131.
- Others
  - Winfield S. Cunningham (1900–1986), US Naval Officer, recipient of the Navy Cross for action at Wake Island.
  - George W. Grider (1912–1991), U.S. Representative
  - Ike Pearson (1917–1985), Major League Baseball player
