= James H. Robinson (soldier) =

- Born: Oakland County, Michigan
- Died: July 26, 1864; Memphis, Tennessee
- Burial place: Memphis National Cemetery, Memphis, Tennessee
- Military career
- Allegiance: United States of America; Union
- Branch: United States Army: Union Army
- Rank: Private
- Units: Company B, 3rd Michigan Volunteer Cavalry Regiment
- Conflicts: American Civil War: Battle of Brownsville, AR, Arkansas
- Awards: - Medal of Honor

James H. Robinson (died July 26, 1864) was a Union Army soldier who received the Medal of Honor for his actions during the American Civil War.

A resident of Victor Township, Michigan, Robinson enlisted at the age of 18 in the 3rd Michigan Volunteer Cavalry Regiment, and was mustered in as a private in Company B. On January 27, 1864 at Brownsville, Arkansas, he performed an act of bravery, single-handedly defending himself against a party of seven enemy guerrillas and killing their leader, that garnered him the Medal of Honor.

Private Robinson received the Medal of Honor on April 4, 1864.

He was later killed in action during the war, and his remains were eventually buried in the Memphis National Cemetery, Memphis, Tennessee, where they can be found in Section H, Grave 4131. His gravesite is marked with a government issue Medal of Honor marker.

== Medal of Honor citation ==

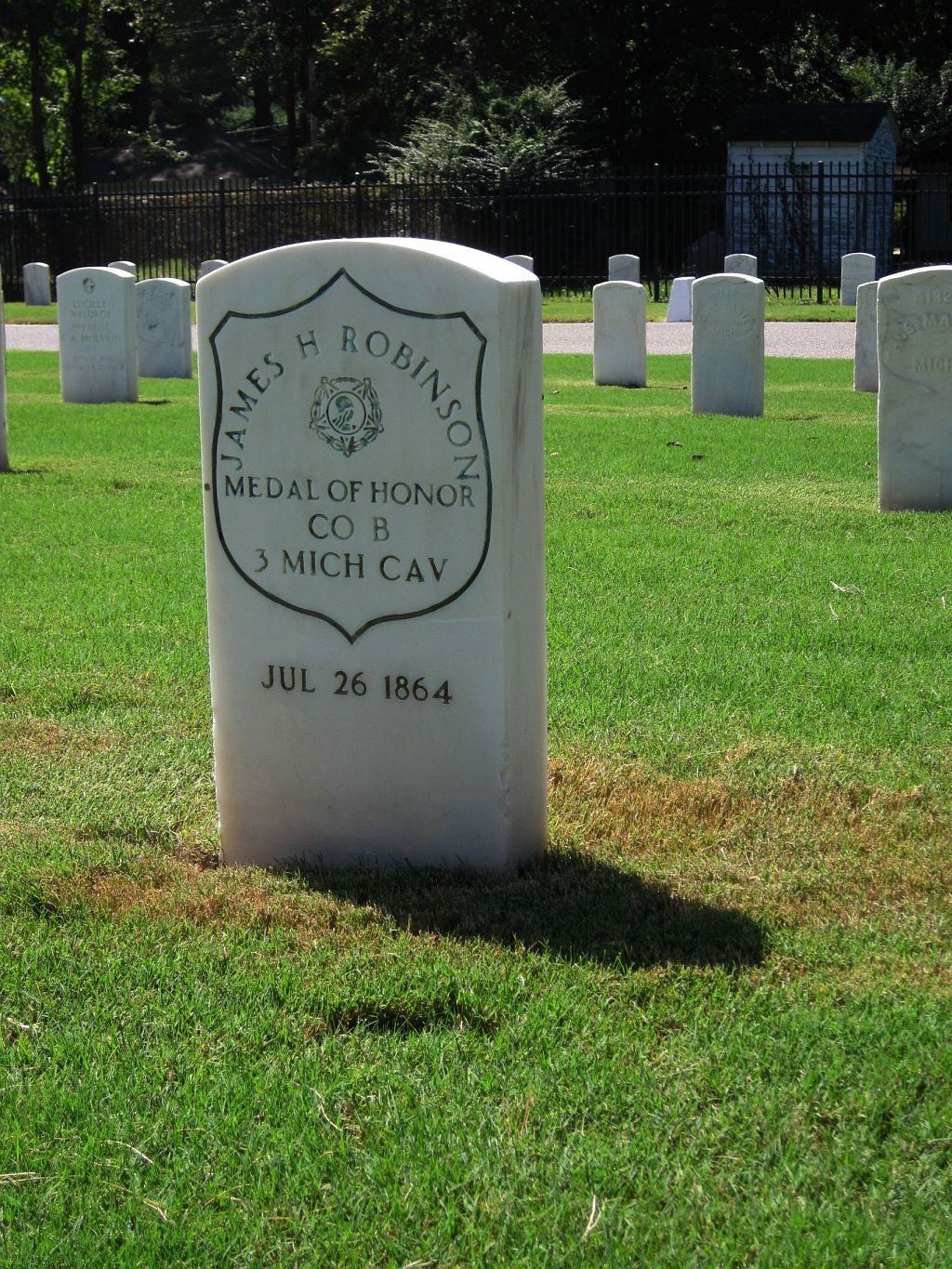
James H. Robinson's tombstone

Rank and Organization:

Private, Company B, 3d Michigan Cavalry. Place and date: At Brownsville, Ark., January 27, 1864. Entered service at: Victor, Mich. Birth. Oakland County, Mich. Date of issue: April 4, 1864.

Citation:

Successfully defended himself, single-handed against seven guerrillas, killing the leader (Capt. W. C. Stephenson) and driving off the remainder of the party.

== See also ==
- List of Medal of Honor recipients
- List of American Civil War Medal of Honor recipients: Q–S
