= Nutbush, Memphis =

Neighborhood of Memphis, Tennessee

Coordinates: 35.1707°N 89.9439°W

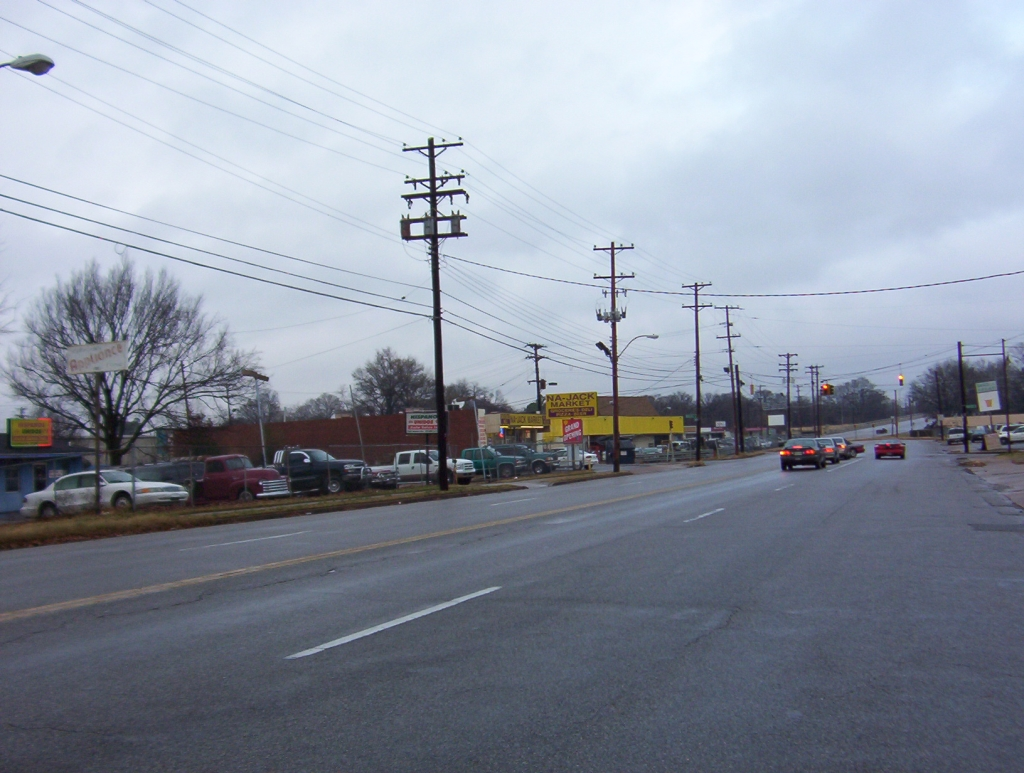
National Street in Nutbush, Memphis (2008)

Nutbush is a long-standing neighborhood in northeastern Memphis, Tennessee, United States.

== Geography ==
Nutbush is bordered by the Chelsea Ave. Greenline Railroad (formerly Union Pacific railway) to the north; North Graham Street to the east; Bayliss Avenue to the south, and Townes Avenue to the south-west. It includes Memphis National Cemetery, and is adjacent to Chickasaw Heights to the south-west and the city's Kingsbury neighborhood to the south-east.

== National Cemetery ==
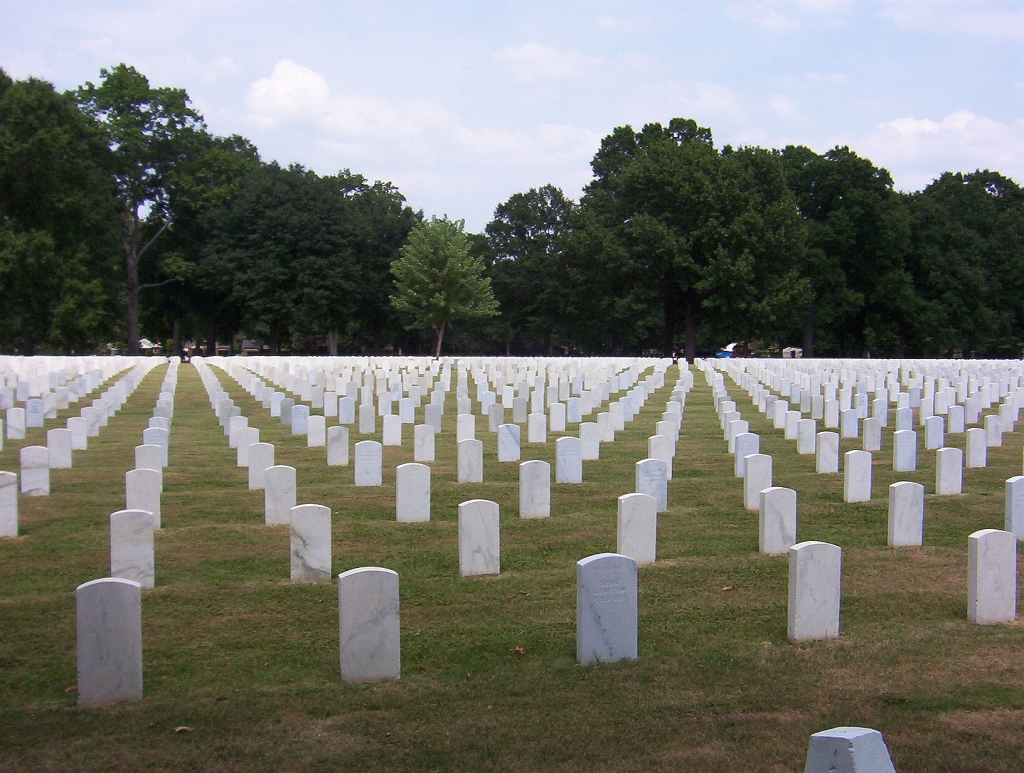
National Cemetery in Nutbush, Memphis (2004)

The Memphis National Cemetery is located in Nutbush, Memphis. On 44.2 acres (0.18 km^{2}), the cemetery had 42,184 interments at the end of 2007.

Several battlefield cemeteries from the American Civil War era were transferred to Memphis and many of the dead from the steamboat Sultana explosion on April 26, 1865, were buried in Memphis National Cemetery.

== See also ==
- Memphis, Tennessee
