= Hollywood, Memphis =

Neighborhood in Memphis, Tennessee

Coordinates: 35.1745335°N 89.9753670°W

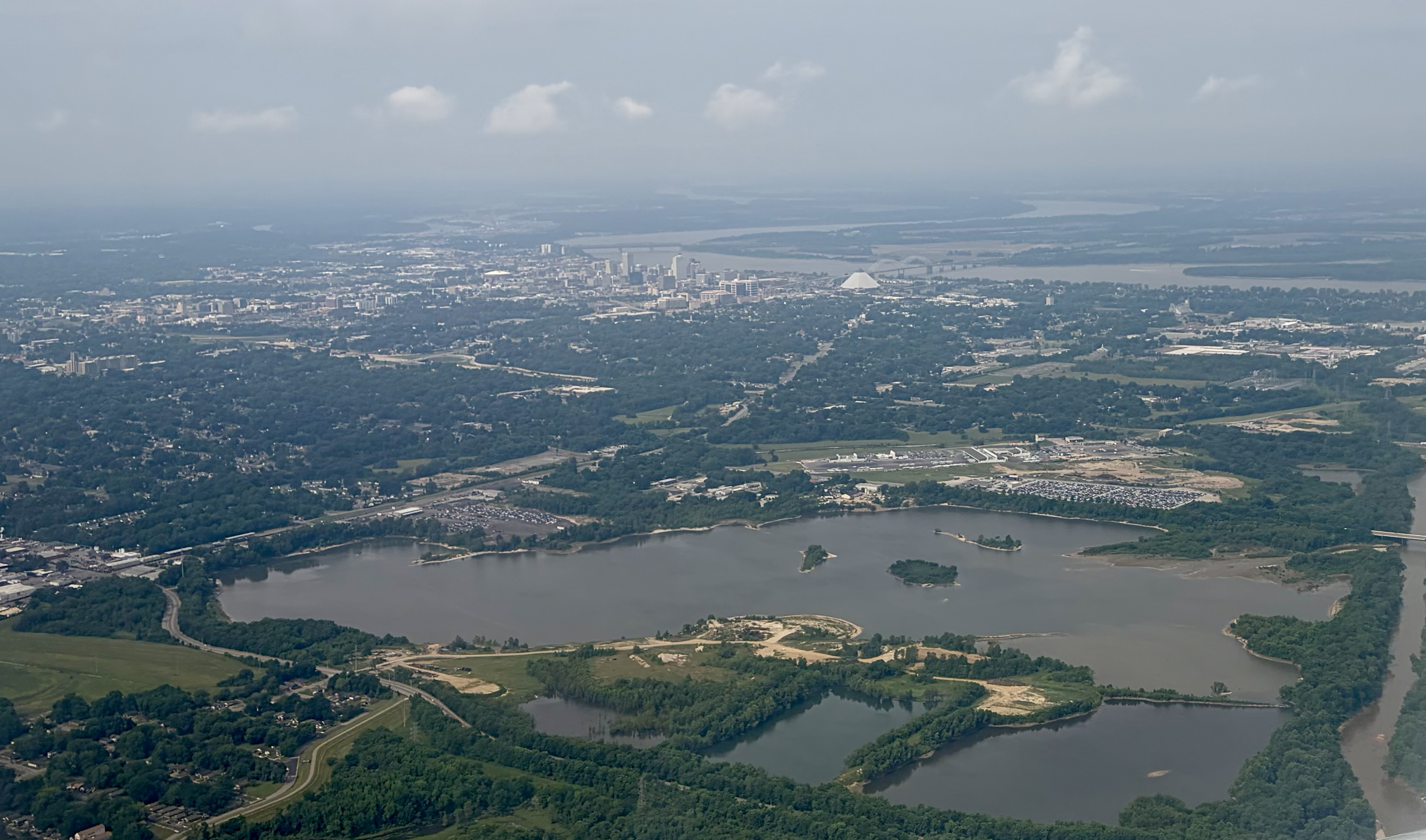
Kilowatt Lake, located adjacent to Hollywood (foreground), is part of the Wolf River (far right) basin in North Memphis.

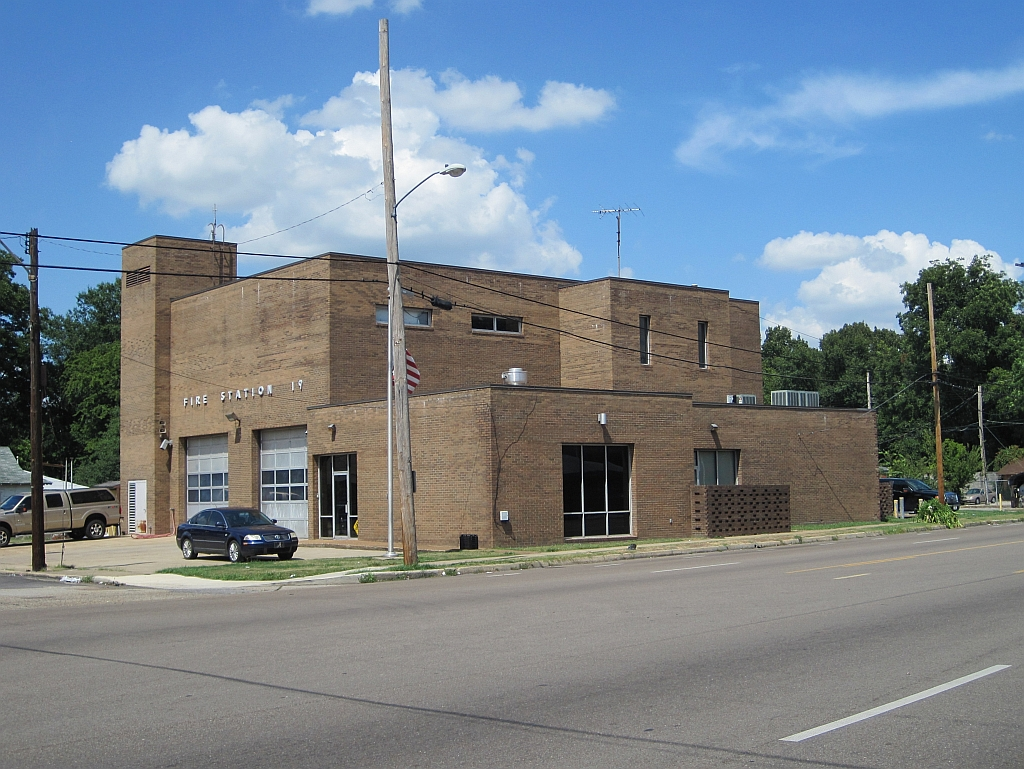
Fire Station No. 19 on Chelsea Avenue in Hollywood

Hollywood is a neighborhood on the north side of Memphis, Tennessee, United States.
