= List of high schools in Tennessee =

This is a list of high schools, either currently open, closed, or planned to open in the future, in the U.S. state of Tennessee.

== Anderson County ==
- Oak Ridge High School, Oak Ridge

=== Clinton ===
- Anderson County High School
- Clinton High School

== Bedford County ==
- Central High School, Shelbyville
- Community High School, Unionville
- Webb School, Bell Buckle
- Cascade High School, Wartrace

== Benton County ==
- Big Sandy K-12 School, Big Sandy
- Camden Central High School, Camden

== Bledsoe County ==
- Bledsoe County High School, Pikeville

== Blount County ==
- Alcoa High School, Alcoa

=== Maryville ===
- Eagleton College and Career Academy
- Heritage High School
- Maryville High School
- William Blount High School

== Bradley County ==
- Walker Valley High School, Charleston

=== Cleveland ===
- Bradley Central High School
- Cleveland High School
- Tennessee Christian Preparatory School
- United Christian Academy

== Campbell County ==
- Campbell County High School, Jacksboro
- Jellico High School, Jellico

== Cannon County ==
- Cannon County High School, Woodbury

== Carroll County ==
- Clarksburg High School, Clarksburg
- Hollow Rock-Bruceton Central High School, Bruceton
- Huntingdon High School, Huntingdon
- McKenzie High School, McKenzie
- West Carroll Jr/Sr High School, Atwood

== Carter County ==
- Cloudland High School, Roan Mountain
- Hampton High School, Hampton
- Unaka High School, Hunter

=== Elizabethton ===
- Elizabethton High School
- Happy Valley High School

== Cheatham County ==
- Cheatham County Central High School, Ashland City
- Harpeth High School, Kingston Springs

=== Pleasant View ===
- Pleasant View Christian School
- Sycamore High School

== Chester County ==
- Chester County High School, Henderson

== Claiborne County ==
- Claiborne High School, Tazewell (replaces Claiborne County High School)

=== Harrogate ===
- J. Frank White Academy
- Cumberland Gap High School

== Clay County ==
- Clay County High School, Celina

== Cocke County ==
- Cocke County High School, Newport
- Cosby High School, Cosby

== Coffee County ==
- Coffee County Central High School, Manchester
- Tullahoma High School, Tullahoma

== Crockett County ==
- Crockett County High School, Alamo

== Cumberland County ==
=== Crossville ===
- Cumberland County High School
- Stone Memorial High School
- The Phoenix School

== Davidson County ==
- Nashville Christian School, Bellevue
- Metro Christian Academy, Goodlettsville
- Whites Creek High School, Whites Creek

=== Antioch ===
- Antioch High School
- Ezell-Harding Christian School

=== Madison ===
- Goodpasture Christian School
- Madison Academy

=== Nashville ===
==== Public ====
- Academy at Old Cockrill
- Cane Ridge High School
- Early College High School
- East Nashville Magnet High School
- Glencliff High School
- Hillsboro High School
- Hillwood Comprehensive High School
- Hume-Fogg High School
- Hunters Lane High School
- John Overton Comprehensive High School
- KIPP Nashville Collegiate High School
- Knowledge Academies
- LEAD Southeast High School
- Martin Luther King Magnet at Pearl High School
- Maplewood Comprehensive High School
- McGavock High School
- Nashville Big Picture High School
- Nashville School of the Arts
- Pearl-Cohn Comprehensive High School
- RePublic High School
- Stratford High School
- Valor College Prep

==== Private ====
- Christ Presbyterian Academy
- Davidson Academy
- Donelson Christian Academy
- The Ensworth School
- Father Ryan High School
- Franklin Road Academy
- Harpeth Hall School
- Lipscomb Academy
- Montgomery Bell Academy
- St. Cecilia Academy
- University School of Nashville

== Decatur County ==
- Riverside High School, Decaturville

== DeKalb County ==
- DeKalb County High School, Smithville

== Dickson County ==
- Creek Wood High School, Charlotte
- Dickson County High School, Dickson

== Dyer County ==
- Dyer County High School, Newbern
- Dyersburg High School, Dyersburg

== Fayette County ==
- Rossville Christian Academy, Rossville

=== Somerville ===
- Fayette Ware Comprehensive High School
- Fayette Academy

== Fentress County ==
- Alvin C. York Institute, Jamestown
- Clarkrange High School, Clarkrange

== Franklin County ==
- Franklin County High School, Winchester
- St. Andrew's-Sewanee School, Sewanee
- Huntland K-12 School, Huntland

== Gibson County ==
- Bradford High School, Bradford
- Gibson County High School, Dyer
- Humboldt High School, Humboldt
- Milan High School, Milan
- Peabody High School, Trenton
- South Gibson County High School, Medina

== Giles County ==
- Giles County High School, Pulaski
- Richland High School, Lynnville

== Grainger County ==
- Grainger High School, Rutledge (replaced Rutledge HS)
- Washburn High School, Washburn

== Greene County ==
- Chuckey-Doak High School, Afton
- Greeneville High School, Greeneville
- North Greene High School, Baileyton
- South Greene High School, South Greene
- West Greene High School, Mosheim

== Grundy County ==
- Grundy County High School, Coalmont

== Hamblen County ==
=== Morristown ===
- Morristown-Hamblen High School East
- Morristown-Hamblen High School West

== Hamilton County ==
- Chattanooga Central High School, Harrison
- Collegedale Academy, Collegedale
- Red Bank High School, Red Bank
- Sale Creek High School, Sale Creek
- Signal Mountain High School, Signal Mountain

=== Chattanooga ===
- Baylor School
- Brainerd High School
- Boyd Buchanan High School
- Chattanooga Christian School
- Chattanooga High School Center for Creative Arts
- Chattanooga School for the Arts and Sciences
- Chattanooga Collegiate High School
- East Ridge High School
- Girls Preparatory School
- Grace Academy
- Hamilton Heights Christian Academy
- Howard School of Academics and Technology
- Lookout Valley Middle High School
- The McCallie School
- Notre Dame High School
- Silverdale Baptist Academy
- Tyner Academy of Math, Science, & Technology (formerly known as Tyner High School)

=== Hixson ===
- Berean Christian Academy
- Hixson High School

=== Ooltewah ===
- East Hamilton High School
- Ooltewah High School

=== Soddy-Daisy ===
- Sequoyah High School
- Soddy Daisy High School

== Hancock County ==
- Hancock County Middle/High School, Sneedville

== Hardeman County ==
- Bolivar Central High School, Bolivar
- Middleton High School, Middleton

== Hardin County ==
=== Savannah ===
- Harbert Hills Academy
- Hardin County High School

== Hawkins County ==
- Cherokee Comprehensive High School, Rogersville
- Clinch Alternative School, Eidson
- Volunteer Comprehensive High School, Church Hill

== Haywood County ==
- Haywood High School, Brownsville

== Henderson County ==
- Lexington High School, Lexington
- Scotts Hill High School, Reagan

== Henry County ==
- Henry County High School, Paris

== Hickman County ==
- Hickman County High School, Centerville
- East Hickman High School, Lyles

== Houston County ==
- Houston County High School, Erin

== Humphreys County ==
- McEwen High School, McEwen
- Waverly Central High School, Waverly

== Jackson County ==
- Jackson County High School, Gainesboro

== Jefferson County ==
- Jefferson County High School, Dandridge
- Lakeway Christian Academy, White Pine

== Johnson County ==
- Johnson County High School, Mountain City

== Knox County ==
- Carter High School, Strawberry Plains
- Farragut High School, Farragut
- Gibbs High School, Corryton
- Halls High School & North Knox Career/Tech Center, Halls Crossroads
- Karns High School & Byington-Solway Career/Tech Center, Karns

=== Knoxville ===
- Austin-East High School
- Bearden High School
- Berean Christian School (BCS)
- Christian Academy of Knoxville (CAK)
- Central High School
- Dr. Paul L. Kelley Volunteer Academy
- Fulton High School
- Grace Christian Academy
- Hardin Valley Academy
- Knoxville Catholic High School
- Knoxville Christian School
- L&N STEM Academy
- Lincoln Park Technology & Trade Center
- Richard Yoakley Alternative School
- Ridgedale Alternative School
- South-Doyle High School
- Tennessee Governor's Academy (TGA)
- Tennessee School for the Deaf
- Webb School of Knoxville
- West High School

=== Powell ===
- Powell High School
- Temple Baptist Academy

== Lake County ==
- Lake County High School, Tiptonville

== Lauderdale County ==
- Halls High School, Halls
- Ripley High School, Ripley

== Lawrence County ==
- Lawrence County High School, Lawrenceburg
- Loretto High School, Loretto
- Summertown High School, Summertown

== Lewis County ==
- Lewis County High School, Hohenwald

== Lincoln County ==
=== Fayetteville ===
- Fayetteville High School
- Lincoln County High School

== Loudon County ==
- Greenback K-12 School, Greenback
- Lenoir City High School, Lenoir City
- Loudon High School, Loudon

== Macon County ==
- Macon County High School, Lafayette
- Red Boiling Springs High School, Red Boiling Springs

== Madison County ==
=== Jackson ===
- Jackson Central-Merry High School
- Jackson Christian School
- Liberty Technology Magnet High School
- Madison Academic Magnet High School
- North Side High School
- South Side High School
- Trinity Christian Academy
- University School of Jackson
- West Tennessee School for the Deaf

== Marion County ==
- Marion County High School, Jasper
- Whitwell High School, Whitwell

=== South Pittsburg ===
- Richard Hardy Memorial School
- South Pittsburg High School

== Marshall County ==
- Cornersville High School, Cornersville
- Forrest High School, Chapel Hill
- Marshall County High School, Lewisburg

== Maury County ==
- Culleoka K-12 School, Culleoka
- Hampshire K-12 School, Hampshire
- Mount Pleasant High School, Mount Pleasant
- Santa Fe K-12 School, Santa Fe
- Battle Creek High School, Spring Hill

=== Columbia ===
- Columbia Academy
- Columbia Central High School
- Spring Hill High School

== McMinn County ==
- McMinn Central High School, Englewood

=== Athens ===
- McMinn County High School
- Fairview Christian Academy
- Christ Legacy Academy

== McNairy County ==
- Adamsville High School, Adamsville
- McNairy Central High School, Selmer

== Meigs County ==
- Meigs County High School, Decatur

== Monroe County ==
- Sequoyah High School, Madisonville
- Sweetwater High School, Sweetwater
- Tellico Plains High School, Tellico Plains

== Montgomery County ==
- Fort Campbell High School, Fort Campbell
  - The Fort Campbell Army base straddles the Kentucky-Tennessee border. The school is physically located in Tennessee, but is not a member of the Tennessee Secondary School Athletic Association, the state's governing body for interscholastic activities. It is instead a member of the Kentucky High School Athletic Association. Most of the base housing is in Kentucky, the school was originally on the Kentucky side of the base, and it is operated by the Kentucky District of the U.S. Department of Defense Domestic Dependent Elementary and Secondary Schools, along with all other schools on Fort Campbell and the schools on the Fort Knox base situated entirely in Kentucky.
- Montgomery Central High School, Cunningham

=== Clarksville ===
- Clarksville Academy
- Clarksville Christian School
- Clarksville High School
- Kenwood High School
- Middle College HS @ APSU
- Northeast High School
- Northwest High School
- Rossview High School
- West Creek High School

== Moore County ==
- Moore County High School, Lynchburg

== Morgan County ==
- Wartburg-Central High School, Wartburg
- Coalfield School, Coalfield
- Oakdale High School, Oakdale
- Sunbright High School, Sunbright

== Obion County ==
- Obion County Central High School, Troy
- South Fulton High School, South Fulton
- Union City High School, Union City

== Overton County ==
- Livingston Academy, Livingston

== Perry County ==
- Perry County High School, Linden

== Pickett County ==
- Pickett County High School, Byrdstown

== Polk County ==
- Copper Basin High School, Copperhill
- Polk County High School, Benton

== Putnam County ==
- Cookeville High School, Cookeville
- Upperman High School, Baxter

=== Monterey ===
- Heritage Academy
- Monterey High School

== Rhea County ==
- Rhea County High School, Evensville
- Rhea County Academy, Dayton

== Roane County ==
- Harriman High School, Harriman
- Oliver Springs High School, Oliver Springs
- Rockwood High School, Rockwood

=== Kingston ===
- Midway High School
- Roane County High School

== Robertson County ==
- Jo Byrns High School, Cedar Hill
- East Robertson High School, Cross Plains
- Springfield High School, Springfield
- White House Heritage High School, White House

=== Greenbrier ===
- Dayspring Academy
- Greenbrier High School

== Rutherford County ==
- Eagleville K-12 School, Eagleville
- La Vergne High School, La Vergne
- Rockvale High School, Rockvale

=== Murfreesboro ===
- Blackman High School
- Central Magnet School
- Daniel McKee Alternative School
- Franklin Road Christian School
- Holloway High School
- Middle Tennessee Christian School
- Oakland High School
- Riverdale High School
- Siegel High School

=== Smyrna ===
- Lancaster Christian Academy
- Smyrna High School
- Smyrna West Alternative School
- Stewarts Creek High School

== Scott County ==
- Oneida High School, Oneida

=== Huntsville ===
- Huntsville High School
- Scott High School

== Sequatchie County ==
- Sequatchie County High School, Dunlap

== Sevier County ==
- Gatlinburg-Pittman High School, Gatlinburg
- Northview Academy, Kodak
- Pigeon Forge High School, Pigeon Forge

=== Sevierville ===
- Parkway Academy
- Sevier County High School

=== Seymour ===
- King's Academy
- Seymour High School
- Seymour Christian School

== Shelby County ==
- Bartlett High School, Bartlett
- Millington Central High School, Millington
- Tipton Rosemark Academy, Rosemark

=== Arlington ===
- Arlington High School
- Bolton High School

=== Collierville ===
- Collierville High School
- St. George's Independent Schools

=== Cordova ===
- Cordova High School
- Saint Benedict at Auburndale

=== Germantown ===
- Germantown High School
- Houston High School

=== Memphis ===
==== Public ====
- Booker T. Washington High School
- Central High School
- Craigmont High School
- Douglass High School
- East High School
- Fairley High School
- Hamilton High School
- Hillcrest High School
- Kingsbury High School
- Kirby High School
- Manassas High School
- Melrose High School
- Mitchell High School
- Oakhaven High School
- Overton High School
- Raleigh-Egypt High School
- Ridgeway High School
- Sheffield High School
- Southwind High School
- Trezevant High School
- Westwood High School
- White Station High School
- Whitehaven High School
- Wooddale High School

==== Private ====
- Briarcrest Christian School
- Christian Brothers High School
- The Collegiate School of Memphis
- Concord Academy
- Evangelical Christian School
- First Assembly Christian School
- Harding Academy
- Hutchison School
- Immaculate Conception Cathedral High School
- Lausanne Collegiate School
- Macon Road Baptist School
- Margolin Hebrew Academy
- Memphis Catholic High School
- Memphis Jewish High School
- Memphis University School
- Middle College High School
- St. Agnes Academy-St. Dominic School
- St. Mary's Episcopal School
- Westminster Academy

== Smith County ==
- Gordonsville High School, Gordonsville
- Smith County High School, Carthage

== Stewart County ==
- Stewart County High School, Dover

== Sullivan County ==
=== Bristol ===
- Bristol Tennessee High School

=== Blountville ===
- Tri-Cities Christian Academy
- West Ridge High School

=== Bluff City ===
- Sullivan East High School

=== Kingsport ===
- Dobyns-Bennett High School

== Sumner County ==
- Westmoreland High School, Westmoreland
- White House High School, White House

=== Gallatin ===
- Gallatin High School
- Station Camp High School

=== Hendersonville ===
- Beech Senior High School
- Hendersonville Christian Academy
- Hendersonville High School
- Merrol Hyde Magnet School
- Pope John Paul II High School

=== Portland ===
- Highland Academy
- Portland High School

== Tipton County ==
- Brighton High School, Brighton
- Covington High School, Covington
- Munford High School, Munford

== Trousdale County ==
- Trousdale County High School, Hartsville

== Unicoi County ==
- Unicoi County High School, Erwin

== Union County ==
- Union County High School, Maynardville

== Van Buren County ==
- Van Buren County High School, Spencer

== Warren County ==
=== McMinnville ===
- F.C. Boyd Christian School
- Warren County High School

== Washington County ==
- Daniel Boone High School, Gray
- David Crockett High School, Jonesborough

=== Johnson City ===
- Science Hill High School
- University School

== Wayne County ==
- Collinwood High School, Collinwood
- Frank Hughes School, Clifton
- Wayne County High School, Waynesboro

== Weakley County ==
- Dresden High School, Dresden
- Gleason High School, Gleason
- Greenfield High School, Greenfield
- Sharon School, Sharon
- Westview High School, Martin

== White County ==
- White County High School, Sparta

== Williamson County ==
- Fairview High School, Fairview
- Fred J. Page High School, Rudderville (Franklin mailing address)
- Independence High School, Thompson's Station
- Nolensville High School, Nolensville
- Summit High School, Spring Hill

=== Brentwood ===
- Brentwood Academy
- Brentwood High School
- Ravenwood High School

=== Franklin ===
- Battle Ground Academy
- Centennial High School
- Franklin High School
- Renaissance High School, Franklin

== Wilson County ==
- Watertown High School, Watertown

=== Lebanon ===
- Friendship Christian School
- Lebanon High School
- Wilson Central High School

=== Mount Juliet ===
- Green Hill High School
- Mount Juliet Christian Academy
- Mount Juliet High School

== See also ==
- List of school districts in Tennessee
