= List of schools in Memphis-Shelby County Schools =

Memphis-Shelby County Schools (MSCS) is a public school district serving schools in Shelby County, Tennessee. MSCS directly operates optional and non-optional schools and oversees many charter schools.

== Current schools (2025–26) ==
=== Elementary schools ===
- A.B. Hill Elementary School
- Alcy Elementary school
- Balmoral-Ridgeway Elementary School
- Belle Forest Community School
- Berclair Elementary School
- Bethel Grove Elementary School
- Brownsville Road Elementary School
- Bruce Elementary School
- Campus Elementary School
- Cherokee Elementary School
- Chimneyrock Elementary School
- Cordova Elementary School
- Cromwell Elementary School
- Crump Elementary School
- Cummings Elementary School
- Delano Elementary School
- Double Tree Elementary School
- Downtown Elementary School
- Dunbar Elementary School
- Egypt Elementary School
- Evans Elementary School
- Ford Road Elementary School
- Fox Meadows Elementary School
- Gardenview Elementary School
- Germanshire Elementary School
- Getwell Elementary School
- Grahamwood Elementary School
- Hawkins Mill Elementary School
- Hickory Ridge Elementary School
- Highland Oak Elementary School
- Holmes Road Elementary School
- Ida b Wells Elementary School
- Idlewild Elementary School
- Jackson Elementary School
- Kate Bond Elementary School
- Keystone Elementary School
- Kingsbury Elementary School
- LaRose Elementary School
- Levi Elementary School
- Lucie E. Campbell Elementary School
- Macon-Hall Elementary School
- Newberry Elementary School
- North Haven Elementary School
- Oak Forest Elementary School
- Oakshire Elementary School
- Parkway Village Elementary School
- Peabody Elementary School
- Raleigh-Bartlett Meadows Elementary School
- Richland Elementary School
- Riverwood Elementary School
- Robert R Church Elementary School
- Ross Elementary School
- Rozelle Elementary School
- Scenic Hills Elementary School
- Sea Isle Elementary School
- Sharpe Elementary School
- Sheffield Elementary School
- Shelby Oaks Elementary School
- Sherwood Elementary School
- South Park Elementary School
- Southwind Elementary School
- Springdale Elementary School
- Treadwell Elementary School
- Vollentine Elementary School
- Wells Station Elementary School
- Westhaven Elementary School
- Westside Elementary School
- White Station Elementary School
- Whitehaven Elementary School
- Whitney Elementary School
- William H Brewster Elementary School *Willow Oaks Elementary School

=== Middle schools ===
- A. Maceo Middle School
- American Way Middle School
- Bellevue Middle School
- Colonial Middle School
- Cordova Middle School
- Craigmont Middle School
- Gregorian Hills Middle School
- Grandview Heights Middle School
- Hanview Middle School
- Hickory Ridge Middle School
- Highland Oaks Middle School
- Kate Bond Middle School
- Kingsbury Middle School
- Maxine Smith STEAM Academy
- Mt. Pisgah Middle School
- Oakhaven Middle School
- Raleigh Egypt Middle School
- Ridgeway Middle School
- Sherwood Middle School
- Treadwell Middle School
- White Station Middle School
- Woodstock Middle School

=== Middle & high schools ===
- Booker T. Washington Middle & High School

=== K–8 schools ===
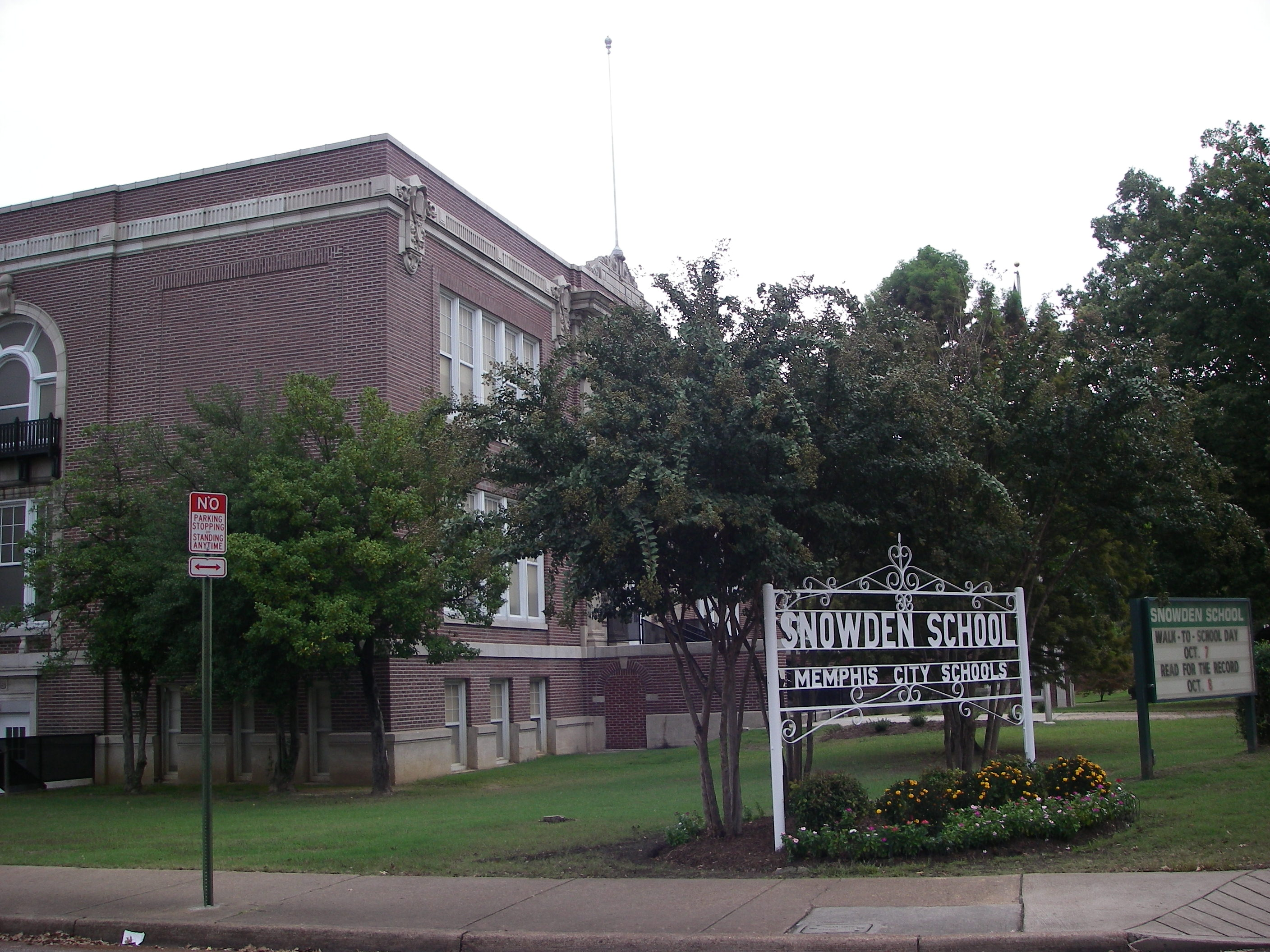
Snowden School

- Airways Achievement Academy
- Barret's Chapel School
- Dexter Elementary K–8
- Douglass School
- E.E. Jeter K–8 School
- Geeter K–8 School
- Gordon Achievement Academy
- Hamilton K–8 School
- Hanley Academy
- John P Freeman School
- Lowrance School
- Norris Achievement Academy
- Riverview School
- Snowden School

=== High schools ===
- Avon Lenox High School
- Bolton High School
- Booker T Washington High School
- Central High School
- Cordova High School
- Craigmont High School
- Douglass High School
- East High School
- G.W. Carver College & Career Academy
- Germantown High School
- Hamilton High School
- Hollis F. Price Middle College High School
- Kingsbury High School
- Kirby High School
- Manassas High School
- Melrose High School
- Medical District High School
- Middle College High School
- Mitchell High School
- Northeast Prep Academy
- Northwest Prep Academy
- Oakhaven High School
- Overton High School
- Raleigh-Egypt High School
- Ridgeway High School
- Sheffield High School
- Southwind High School
- Trezevant High School
- Westwood High School
- White Station High School
- Whitehaven High School
- Wooddale High School

=== Charter schools ===
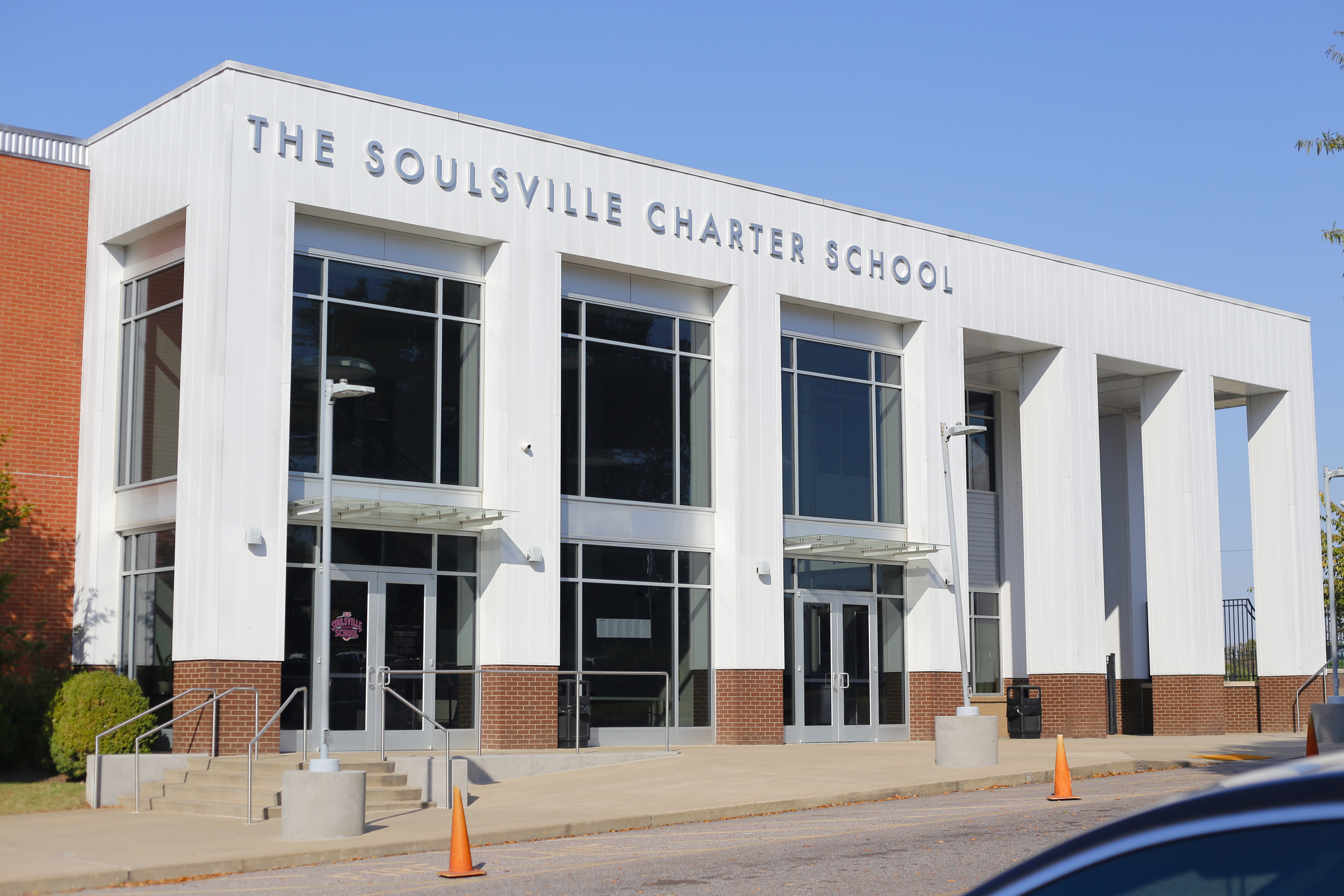
Soulsville Charter School

- Arrow Academy of Excellence
- Aspire East Academy (Journey Community Schools)
- Aurora Collegiate Academy
- Beacon College Prep
- Believe Memphis Academy
- Circles of Success Learning Academy
- City University School Girls Preparatory
- City University School of Independence
- City University School of Liberal Arts
- Compass Berclair
- Compass Binghampton
- Compass Frayser
- Compass Hickory Hill
- Compass Midtown
- Compass Orange Mound
- Crosstown High School
- Freedom Preparatory Academy Westwood Elementary at Parkrose Campus
- Freedom Preparatory Academy Whitehaven Elementary at Millbranch Campus
- Freedom Preparatory Academy Flagship (MS)
- Freedom Preparatory Academy Flagship (HS)
- Freedom Preparatory Academy Whitehaven Middle at Brownlee Campus
- Granville T. Woods Academy of Innovation
- Kaleidoscope School of Memphis
- KIPP Memphis Academy Middle
- KIPP Memphis Collegiate Elementary
- KIPP Memphis Collegiate High
- KIPP Memphis Collegiate Middle School
- Leadership Preparatory Charter School
- Libertas Montessori School
- Memphis Academy of Health Sciences High
- Memphis Academy of Health Sciences Middle
- Memphis Academy of Science and Engineering
- Memphis Business Academy Elementary
- Memphis Business Academy Hickory Hill Elementary
- Memphis Business Academy Hickory Hill Middle
- Memphis Business Academy High
- Memphis Business Academy Middle
- Memphis College Prep Elementary
- Memphis Delta Prep Charter School
- Memphis Grizzlies Preparatory
- Memphis Merit Academy
- Memphis Rise Academy
- Memphis School of Excellence
- Memphis School of Excellence Elementary
- Memphis School of Excellence Elementary Cordova
- Memphis STEM Academy
- Perea Elementary
- Power Center Academy ES Hickory Hill
- Power Center Academy ES Southeast
- Power Center Academy MS Hickory Hill
- Power Center Academy MS Southeast
- Power Center HS Hickory Hill
- Promise Academy Hollywood
- Southern Ave Charter Elementary
- STAR Academy
- Soulsville Charter School
- Veritas College Preparatory
- Vision Preparatory Charter School

=== Early Childhood Education ===
- Ridgeway Early Learning Center

=== Specialized schools ===
- Shrine School
- Hope Academy

== Schools prior to July 2013 ==
=== Elementary schools ===
- Altruria Elementary School (Bartlett)
- Arlington Elementary School (Arlington)
- Bailey Station Elementary School (Collierville/Collierville Annexation Reserve)
- Barret's Elementary School (Unincorporated/Millington-Bartlett-Lakeland-Arlington Annexation Reserves)
- Bartlett Elementary School (Bartlett)
- Bon Lin Elementary School (Bartlett/Bartlett Annexation Reserve)
- Collierville Elementary School (Collierville)
- Crosswind Elementary School (Collierville)
- Dexter Elementary School (Memphis Annexation Reserve)
- Dogwood Elementary School (Germantown/Small Part of Western Collierville)
- Donelson Elementary School (Arlington/Lakeland)
- Ellendale Elementary School (Bartlett/Bartlett Annexation Reserve)
- Farmington Elementary School (Germantown/Extreme NW Collierville)
- Germantown Elementary School (Germantown)
- E. A. Harrold Elementary School (Millington/Millington Annexation Reserve)
- Highland Oaks Primary School (K-1, Memphis Annexation Reserve)
- Highland Oaks Elementary School (2–5, Memphis Annexation Reserve)
- Lakeland Elementary School (Lakeland)
- Lucy Elementary School (Millington/Millington Annexation Reserve)
- Macon-Hall Elementary School (Memphis Annexation Reserve)
- Millington Elementary School (Millington)
- Northaven Elementary School (Unincorporated/Memphis Annexation Reserve)
- Oak Elementary School (Bartlett)
- Rivercrest Elementary School (Bartlett/Bartlett Annexation Reserve)
- Southwind Elementary School (Memphis Annexation Reserve)
- Sycamore Elementary School (Collierville/Collierville Annexation Reserve)
- Tara Oaks Elementary School (Collierville/Collierville Annexation Reserve)

=== Secondary schools ===
==== Middle schools ====
- Appling Middle School (Bartlett)
- Arlington Middle School (Arlington/Unincorporated)
- Bon Lin Middle School (Bartlett/West Part of Lakeland)
- Collierville Middle School (Collierville/Collierville Annexation Reserve)
- Dexter Middle School (Memphis Annexation Reserve)
- Elmore Park Middle School (Bartlett)
- Germantown Middle School (Germantown)
- Highland Oaks Middle School (Memphis Annexation Reserve)
- Houston Middle School (Germantown/West Part of Collierville)
- Millington Middle School (Millington/Millington Annexation Reserve)
- Mt. Pisgah Middle School (Memphis Annexation Reserve)
- Schilling Farms Middle School (Collierville/Collierville Annexation Reserve)
- Shadowlawn Middle School (Bartlett/Bartlett-Memphis Annexation Reserve)

Woodstock Middle School (Millington/Unincorporated)

==== K-8 schools ====
- Riverdale School (Germantown)
- Lowrance Elementary School (Memphis)
- E.E Jeter K-8 School (Millington)

==== High schools ====
- Arlington High School (Arlington/Memphis Annexation Reserve)
- Bartlett High School (Bartlett)
- Bolton High School (North Part of Bartlett/Memphis-Millington-Lakeland-Bartlett-Arlington Annexation Reserves)
- Collierville High School (Collierville)
- Germantown High School (Germantown/Memphis-Collierville Annexation Reserves)
- Houston High School (Germantown)
- Millington Central High School (Millington/Millington-Memphis Annexation Reserves)
- Southwind High School (Memphis Annexation Reserve)

Note: Some areas within the Shelby County Schools coverage area were zoned to Memphis City Schools' Cordova High School (located in an unincorporated area and operated by Memphis City Schools) while being zoned to Shelby County Schools' elementary and middle schools.

== Former schools ==
=== Secondary schools ===
==== High schools ====
- Northside High School – Closed in 2016 due to low enrollment.
- Treadwell High School - Home of many prominent Memphians including the Gentrys, Jimmy Hart, Jerry Lawler and many others. The basketball program was very prominent in the mid 20th century producing icons such as the Wilfong family and NBA star Anfernee "Penny" Hardaway.
- Technical High School - Legacy High School and one of Memphis' first, formerly housed in an iconic building on Poplar Avenue (now home to Memphis Academy of Science and Engineering MASE) and chief early rival of the Central Warriors.

==== Middle schools ====
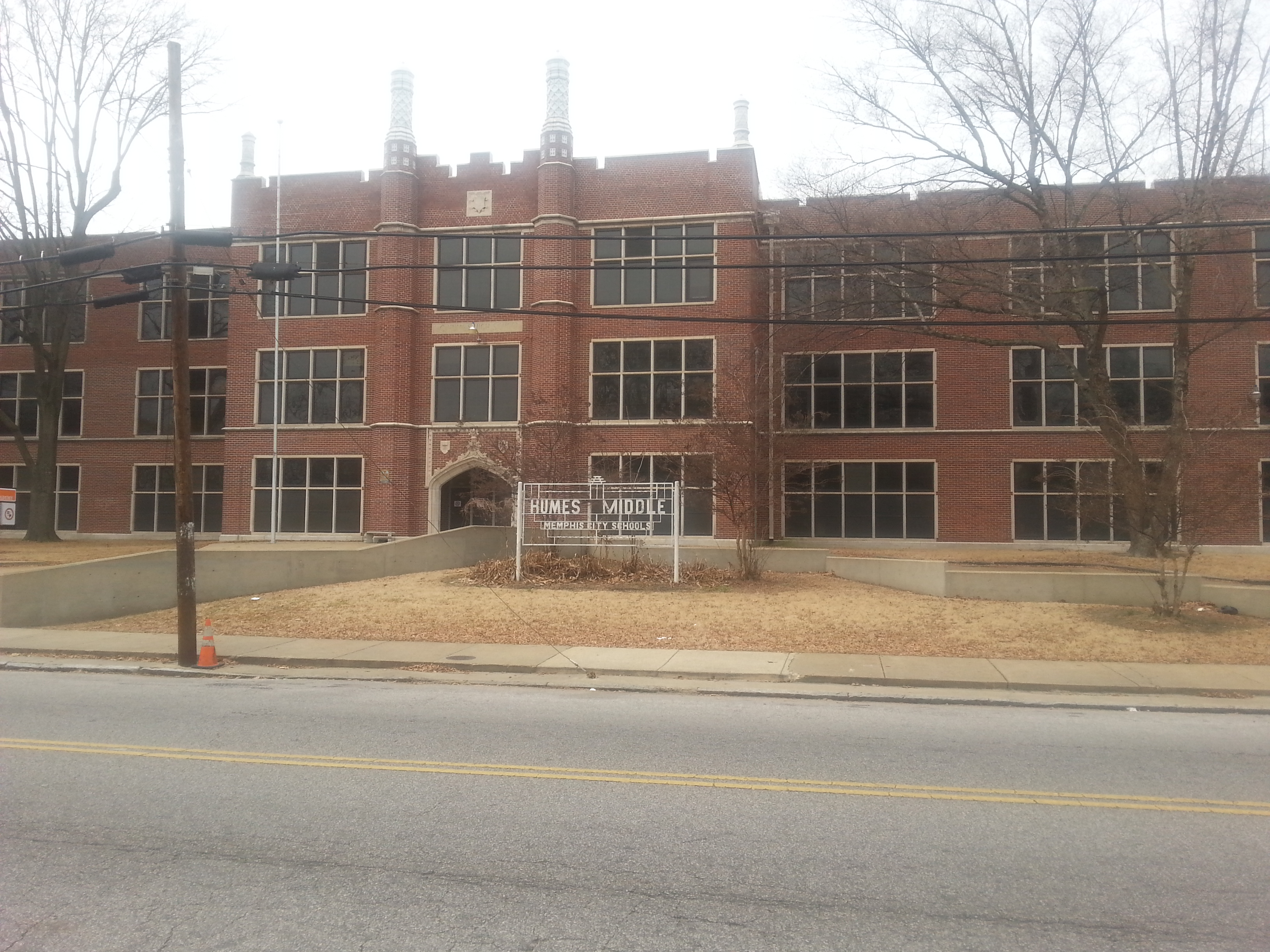
Humes Middle School

- Chicksaw Middle School
- Kirby Middle School (Memphis, Tennessee)
- Raleigh-Egypt Middle School (Memphis, Tennessee) – Annexed with Raleigh in the 1970s.
- Power Center Academy (Memphis, Tennessee)
- Humes Middle School

=== Elementary schools ===
- Brownsville Road Elementary
- Capleville Elementary – Former elementary school on Shelby Drive. Building destroyed by fire in 2009.
- Egypt Elementary – Annexed with Raleigh in the 1970s.
- Frayser-Corning Elementary
- Gregorian Hills Elementary School
- Ida b Wells Elementary School
- Kate Bond Elementary School – (Kate Bond was placed into the Memphis City Schools system in fall 2004)
- Lucy Elementary School
- Millington East Elementary School (Merged with Millington South)
- Millington South Elementary School (Merged with Millington East)
- Ross Elementary
- Winchester Elementary – Annexed with Whitehaven in the 1970s.

== See also ==
- List of high schools in Tennessee
