= List of private schools in Nashville, Tennessee =

This is a list of private schools in Nashville, Tennessee:

== Nashville proper ==
- Christ Presbyterian Academy
- City School of Nashville
- Davidson Academy
- Donelson Christian Academy
- Ensworth School
- Ezell-Harding Christian School
- Father Ryan High School
- Franklin Road Academy
- Goodpasture Christian School
- Harding Academy
- Harpeth Hall School
- Lipscomb Academy
- Madison Academy
- Montgomery Bell Academy
- Nashville Christian School
- Pope John Paul II High School
- St. Cecilia Academy
- St. Paul Christian Academy
- University School of Nashville

== Metropolitan area ==
=== Davidson County ===
- Columbia Academy
- Father Ryan High School
- Franklin Road Academy

=== Williamson County ===
- Battle Ground Academy
- Brentwood Academy

== See also ==
- List of high schools in Tennessee § Davidson County
