= Campbell County Public Schools =

Campbell County Public Schools can refer to:

- Campbell County Public Schools (Tennessee), a school district in Tennessee
- Campbell County Public Schools (Virginia), a school district in Virginia
- Campbell County Schools, a school district in Kentucky
- Campbell County School District Number 1, a school district in Wyoming
