= John Harper (linebacker, born 1960) =

American football player (born 1960)

No. 52
- Position: Linebacker

Personal information
- Born: June 12, 1960 (age 66); Memphis, Tennessee, U.S.
- Listed height: 6 ft 3 in (1.91 m)
- Listed weight: 230 lb (104 kg)

Career information
- High school: Kingsbury (Memphis)
- College: Southern Illinois
- NFL draft: 1983: 4th round, 102nd overall pick

Career history
- Atlanta Falcons (1983); Arizona Cardinals (1984)*; Memphis Showboats (1985)*
- * Offseason or practice squad member only
- Stats at Pro Football Reference

John Harper III (born June 12, 1960) is an American former professional football linebacker who played for the Atlanta Falcons of the National Football League (NFL). He played college football for the Southern Illinois Salukis and was selected by the Falcons in the fourth round of the 1983 NFL draft.

== Early life ==
John Harper III was born on June 12, 1960, in Memphis, Tennessee. He attended Kingsbury High School in Memphis. He was lightly recruited out of high school.

== College career ==
On February 21, 1979, Harper signed a national letter of intent to play college football for the Salukis of Southern Illinois University Carbondale. He was a four-year letterman from 1979 to 1982. He was named the Missouri Valley Conference Defensive Player of the Year as a senior in 1982. Harper finished his college career with 337 tackles and 11 sacks. He was inducted into the Saluki Hall of Fame in 2007.

== Professional career ==
Harper had a 4.75 second 40-yard dash. He was selected by the Atlanta Falcons in the fourth round, with the 102nd overall pick, of the 1983 NFL draft. He signed with the team on June 2 and was an inside linebacker. Harper played in 13 games for the Falcons during the 1983 season, mostly on special teams.

On August 14, 1984, Harper was traded to the Arizona Cardinals for an undisclosed 1985 draft pick. The Cardinals needed backup help at outside linebacker, a new position for Harper. He was released on August 28, 1984.

Harper signed with the Memphis Showboats of the United States Football League (USFL) for the 1985 USFL season. He was placed on the reserve/left squad list on February 18, 1985.
