= Woodmore Elementary School =

Woodmore Elementary School may refer to:

- Woodmore Elementary School, Chattanooga, Tennessee - Hamilton County Schools
- Woodmore Elementary School, Woodmore census-designated place (Mitchellville postal address), Prince George's County, Maryland - Prince George's County Public Schools
