= East Ridge, Tennessee =

- City
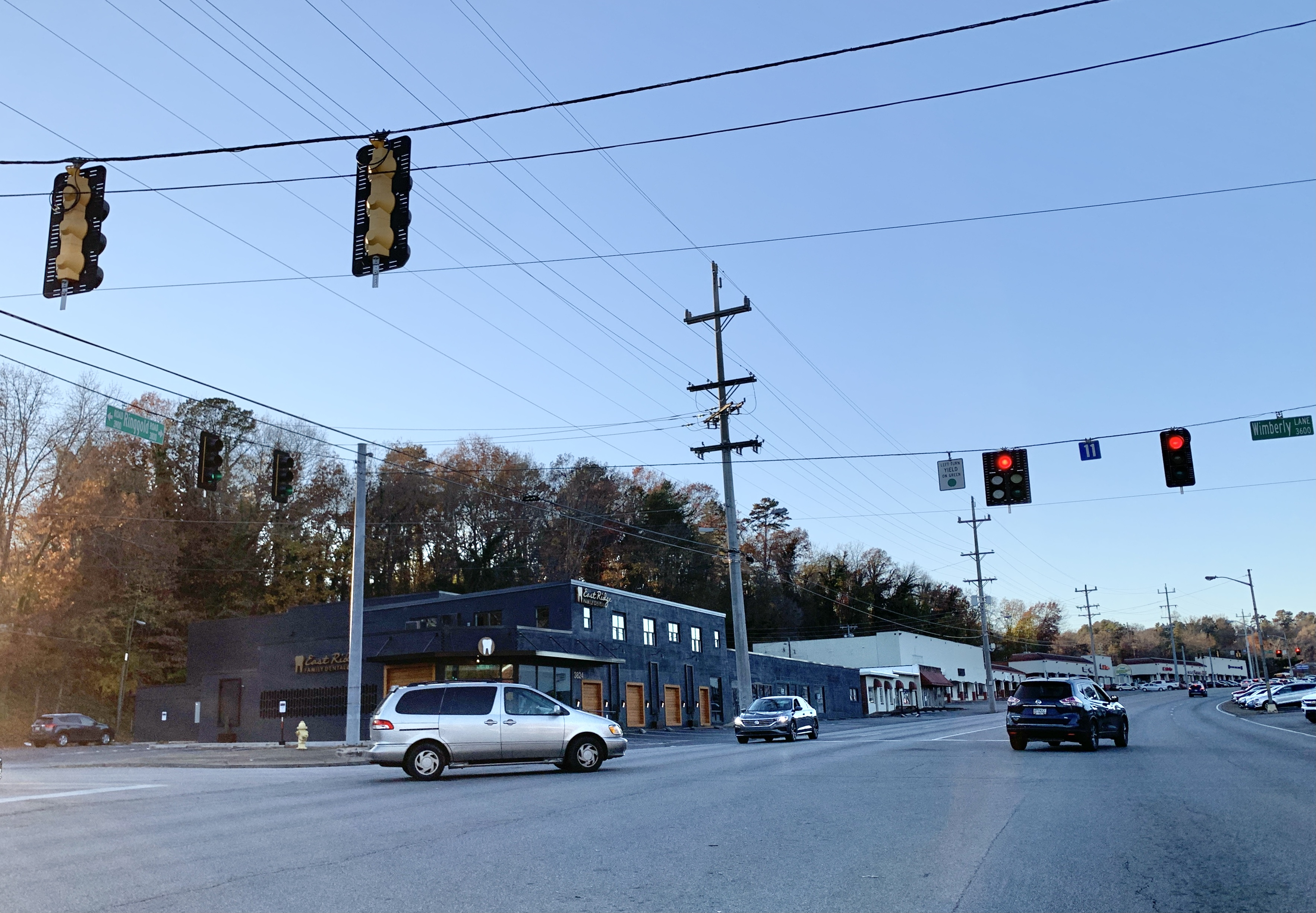

- Flag Seal
- Motto: Gateway to Tennessee
- Location of East Ridge in Hamilton County, Tennessee.
- Coordinates: 34°59′48″N 85°14′15″W
- Country: United States
- State: Tennessee
- County: Hamilton

Government
  - Mayor: Brian Williams
  - Vice-Mayor: Esther Helton Haynes

Area
  - Total: 8.28 sq mi (21.45 km^{2})
  - Land: 8.28 sq mi (21.45 km^{2})
  - Water: 0 sq mi (0.00 km^{2})
- Elevation: 778 ft (237 m)

Population (2020)
  - Total: 22,167
  - Density: 2,676.5/sq mi (1,033.42/km^{2})
- Time zone: UTC-5 (Eastern (EST))
  - Summer (DST): UTC-4 (EDT)
- ZIP code: 37412
- Area code: 423
- FIPS code: 47-22720
- GNIS feature ID: 1283400
- Website: www.eastridgetn.gov

East Ridge is a city in Hamilton County, Tennessee, United States. As of the 2020 census, the city population was 22,167. East Ridge is bordered by Chattanooga to the west, north, and east, and the Georgia state line to the south. It is part of the Chattanooga, TN–GA Metropolitan Statistical Area. The name of the city comes from its location due east of Missionary Ridge. The Bachman Tubes beneath Missionary Ridge link East Ridge with downtown Chattanooga.

== History ==
Early settlers of East Ridge include the Lomenicks, the Conners and the Greens (in the area around Greenslake Road).

The town was incorporated in April 1921 via private act of the Tennessee Legislature. S.M. Hudlow was the first mayor.

The first major public works project was to install electric lighting for the town. Bonds were issued, a construction contract was signed, and work began. Work was complete by September 1922, with 13.9 miles of lines. Power was provided by the Chattanooga Railway and Light Company.

The first Town Hall was built on land donated by the Lomenick family at the corner of Marlboro and Ringgold Roads in 1924. The public works continued in 1926 with the installation of municipal water supply lines, with supply provided by the City Water Company of Chattanooga.

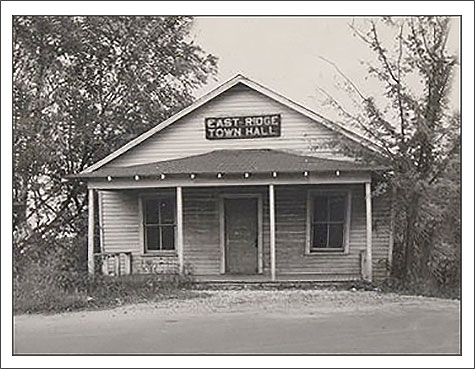
First town hall of East Ridge, at Marlboro and Ringgold

Dissatisfaction with city fathers led to rework of the town charter in 1933, stripping the city of power over schools, roads, police, fire, and garbage services, which were remanded to Hamilton County and to private companies. The charter was again revamped in 1954 to a home rule system, allowing the city to modify its own charter without recourse to the state legislature. In addition, more expansive powers were returned to the city government. At this time, commissioners held more expansive executive powers as commissioners of specific departments in addition to their commission vote. This was later modified in favor of a more traditional council/city manager form of government, where the day-to-day executive power rests with the city manager.

The first municipal sewer system was completed in 1959, along with the new East Ridge High School. In 1963, the city accepted the TN Highway Department's proposal to build a section of I-24 through the city. The city terminated its contract with Chattanooga's Humane Educational Society and opened its own animal shelter in 1970. The city library was completed in March 1973 after a great deal of work by the first library board.

In December 1973, the city used state grant matching funds to purchase a 175-acre farm on Camp Jordan Road that became Camp Jordan Park, the crown jewel of the city. Construction of recreational facilities began in 1978 with an initial budget of $200,000, and was completed in 1980.

== Geography ==
East Ridge is located at 34°59′48″N 85°14′15″W (34.996674, −85.237482).

According to the United States Census Bureau, the city has a total area of 8.3 square miles (21 km^{2}), all land.

== Demographics ==
Historical population
Census	Pop.	Note	%±
1930	2,152		—
1940	2,939		36.6%
1950	9,645		228.2%
1960	19,570		102.9%
1970	21,799		11.4%
1980	21,236		−2.6%
1990	21,101		−0.6%
2000	20,640		−2.2%
2010	20,979		1.6%
2020	22,167		5.7%
2025 (est.)	21,921	▼	−1.1%

=== Racial and ethnic composition ===
East Ridge city, Tennessee – Racial and ethnic composition Note: the US Census treats Hispanic/Latino as an ethnic category. This table excludes Latinos from the racial categories and assigns them to a separate category. Hispanics/Latinos may be of any race.
Race / Ethnicity (NH = Non-Hispanic)	Pop 2000	Pop 2010	Pop 2020	% 2000	% 2010	% 2020
White alone (NH)	19,137	17,086	14,740	92.72%	81.44%	66.50%
Black or African American alone (NH)	660	2,050	2,961	3.20%	9.77%	13.36%
Native American or Alaska Native alone (NH)	62	55	54	0.30%	0.26%	0.24%
Asian alone (NH)	345	372	397	1.67%	1.77%	1.79%
Native Hawaiian or Pacific Islander alone (NH)	7	4	4	0.03%	0.02%	0.02%
Other race alone (NH)	21	32	78	0.10%	0.15%	0.35%
Mixed race or Multiracial (NH)	183	330	1,052	0.89%	1.57%	4.75%
Hispanic or Latino (any race)	225	1,050	2,881	1.09%	5.01%	13.00%
Total	20,640	20,979	22,167	100.00%	100.00%	100.00%

=== 2020 census ===
As of the 2020 census, East Ridge had a population of 22,167. The median age was 38.4 years. 20.9% of residents were under the age of 18 and 17.4% of residents were 65 years of age or older. For every 100 females there were 92.4 males. For every 100 females age 18 and over there were 89.1 males age 18 and over.

100.0% of residents lived in urban areas, while 0.0% lived in rural areas.

There were 9,520 households in East Ridge, of which 26.4% had children under the age of 18 living in them. Of all households, 37.1% were married-couple households, 21.3% were households with a male householder and no spouse or partner present, and 33.7% were households with a female householder and no spouse or partner present. About 33.3% of all households were made up of individuals and 13.7% had someone living alone who was 65 years of age or older.

There were 10,336 housing units, of which 7.9% were vacant. The homeowner vacancy rate was 2.2% and the rental vacancy rate was 8.2%.

Racial composition as of the 2020 census
Race	Number	Percent
White	15,143	68.3%
Black or African American	2,991	13.5%
American Indian and Alaska Native	162	0.7%
Asian	401	1.8%
Native Hawaiian and Other Pacific Islander	5	0.0%
Some other race	1,626	7.3%
Two or more races	1,839	8.3%

=== 2000 census ===
As of the census of 2000, there was a population of 20,640, with 9,288 households and 5,739 families residing in the city. The population density was 2,497.3 inhabitants per square mile (964.2/km^{2}). There were 9,876 housing units at an average density of 1,194.9 per square mile (461.4/km^{2}). The racial makeup of the city was 93.32% White, 3.21% African American, 0.31% Native American, 1.68% Asian, 0.03% Pacific Islander, 0.43% from other races, and 1.02% from two or more races. Hispanic or Latino of any race were 1.09% of the population.

There were 9,288 households, out of which 24.1% had children under the age of 18 living with them, 47.1% were married couples living together, 11.5% had a female householder with no husband present, and 38.2% were non-families. 33.2% of all households were made up of individuals, and 13.3% had someone living alone who was 65 years of age or older. The average household size was 2.20 and the average family size was 2.80.

In the city, the population was spread out, with 19.5% under the age of 18, 8.7% from 18 to 24, 29.1% from 25 to 44, 23.7% from 45 to 64, and 19.0% who were 65 years of age or older. The median age was 40 years. For every 100 females, there were 88.0 males. For every 100 females age 18 and over, there were 83.0 males.

The median income for a household in the city was $36,347, and the median income for a family was $43,858. Males had a median income of $31,359 versus $23,659 for females. The per capita income for the city was $20,346. About 6.7% of families and 8.0% of the population were below the poverty line, including 10.7% of those under age 18 and 7.0% of those age 65 or over.

== Arts and culture ==
The East Ridge City Library is located within the City Hall. In 2008 the East Ridge History Center opened showcasing local history and culture. A community center is also available for use by the public. Located next to City Hall and the Pioneer Frontier Playground, it offers programs for the community.

== Sports ==
East Ridge is home to three minor league level professional soccer clubs who all play their home matches at CHI Memorial Stadium a 2,500 seat soccer-specific stadium with a planned finished capacity of 5,500. It was the first soccer-specific stadium built in Tennessee. It officially opened August 1, 2020.

The Chattanooga Red Wolves SC are a men's club that competes in USL League One, the third tier of American Men's professional soccer at CHI Memorial Stadium. The Chattanooga Lady Red Wolves, a women's club, began play in 2023 as members of the USL W League, the second tier of American Women's professional soccer.

== Parks and recreation ==
Camp Jordan is a local park and an arena. The arena provides space for special and sporting events. Camp Jordan has 13 ball fields, nine soccer fields, an amphitheater, RV spaces, a sand volleyball court, picnic pavilion, fishing pond, playground, and a walking track. East Ridge is home to the East Ridge Soccer Association, which provides soccer programs for youth and adults. The East Ridge Baseball/Softball Association supports ball games for boys and girls. Pioneer Frontier Playground is located by city hall on Tombras Avenue and includes a splash pad which opened in 2022.

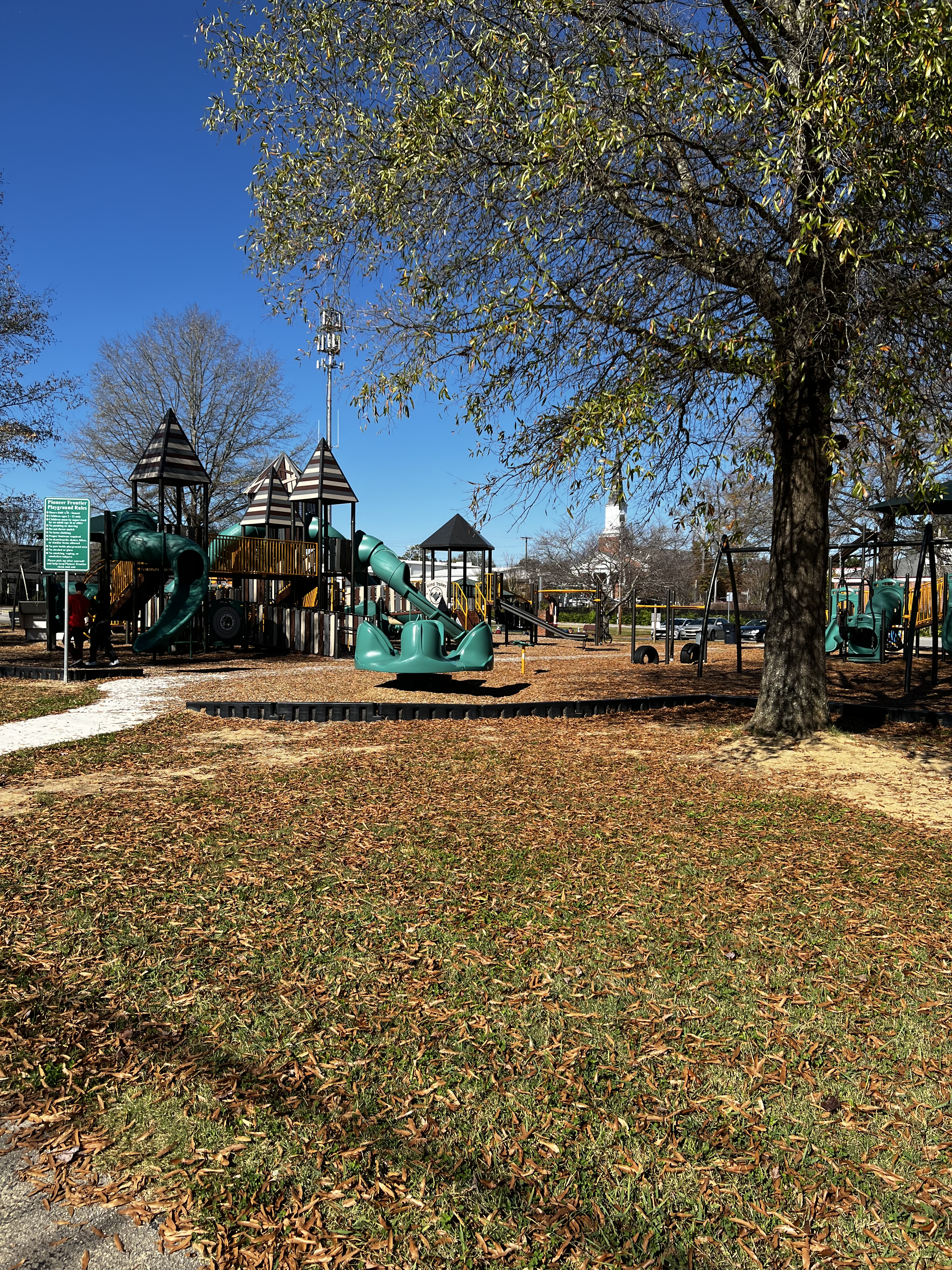
Pioneer Frontier Playground

== Government ==
East Ridge is a home rule city, meaning the City Charter can be modified by referendum without requiring action from the state legislature. East Ridge has City Manager-Council form of government. The elected Mayor serves as chair of the City Council, which is the legislative body, and the day-to-day executive power is vested in the City Manager.

Brian Williams is the current mayor, with term ending in December 2026. Scott Miller is the current City Manager.

== Politics ==
East Ridge city vote by party in presidential elections
Year	Democratic	Republican	Third Parties
2020	40.96% 3,725	56.39% 5,128	2.65% 241
2016	32.51% 2,549	60.37% 4,733	7.12% 558
2012	33.45% 1,558	63.10% 2,939	3.45% 161
2008	29.83% 1,576	67.77% 3,581	2.40% 127

== Education ==
East Ridge has four public schools, which are part of the Hamilton County Schools system: East Ridge Elementary, Spring Creek Elementary, East Ridge Middle School, and East Ridge High School, as well as two private schools: Belvoir Christian Academy and Our Lady of Perpetual Help Catholic School.

== Infrastructure ==
The East Ridge Police Department maintains public safety within the city and is a full service and state certified agency, and also serves the city of Ridgeside. The City of East Ridge Animal Services Division provides animal services by way of animal control and an animal shelter for the city.

=== Utilities ===
Public utilities are provided by Chattanooga Gas Company, Tennessee American Water Company, AT&T, EPB, and Comcast.

=== Health ===
East Ridge is home to Parkridge East Hospital, a branch of Parkridge Medical Center.

== Notable people ==
Elbert Eugene Spriggs (1937–2021), founder of the Twelve Tribes cult group

Father Patrick Ryan (1844–1878), proposed for sainthood for ministry to yellow fever victims and subsequent martyrdom
