= Wantland =

Wantland is a surname. Notable people with the surname include:

- Charles W. Wantland (1888–1964), American athlete and coach
- Hal Wantland (1944–2008), American football player
- William C. Wantland (born 1934), American Anglican bishop
