= WTSD =

WTSD may refer to:

- Waterford Township School District
- West Tallahatchie School District
- West Tennessee School for the Deaf
- Wong Tai Sin District, a district of Kowloon, Hong Kong
- Woodbridge Township School District
- WNDC, a radio station (1190 AM) licensed to serve Leesburg, Virginia, United States, which was WTSD from 2023 until 2026
