= Columbia Military Academy =

Location
- Columbia, Tennessee; United States
- Coordinates: 35°37′00″N 87°03′24″W

Information
- Established: 1904
- Closed: 1979
- Campus: Rural
- Website: http://www.cmaaa.com

Columbia Military Academy was a private boarding school with military training in Columbia, Tennessee. The campus was built as an arsenal for the US Army in 1891 and closed after the Spanish–American War. The arsenal was declared surplus property in 1901 and in 1904 the land was formally turned over to the Columbia Military Academy. CMA opened for classes on August 28, 1905.

The Great Depression was a hard time for all private schools and CMA was no exception. Enrollment dropped to less than two hundred cadets on a regular basis and the academy struggled to stay open. In 1931, however, a new Operating Board led by C.A. Ragsdale and William O. Batts was created and CMA's situation improved under their leadership in the subsequent years. CMA was rated as an Honor School by the Department of the Army in 1935, a distinction it retained until 1975. The JROTC program, added in 1918, and the ROTC program, added in 1947, were inspected annually by active-duty Army officers and active Army officers and NCO's were assigned to the school as instructors.

When Colonel M.F. Gilchrist Jr., a CMA and West Point graduate, was hired to head Columbia Military Academy in June 1962 enrollment was at its highest level with more than five hundred cadets. Col. E. Blythe Hatcher, a long-time instructor at CMA and Dean of Students at Berry College, was hired as President in 1970. Within nine years, however, Columbia Military Academy was unable to continue. Desegregation of public schools in the 1960s precipitated a sudden rise in the number of private day schools across the South and the increasing unpopularity of the Vietnam War (and the drop in prestige of everything military) worsened the situation for military boarding schools like CMA.

In an effort to increase enrollment female day students were added in 1969 but for them participation in the military programs was optional. This introduction of civilian students to CMA furthered the decline of military elements at the school and in 1978 enrollment in the JROTC and ROTC programs dropped below the minimum level. In order to pay its mounting debts, Columbia Military Academy's property was turned over to a local Christian group and CMA was reorganized as Columbia Academy a Christian day school.

== Campus ==
James Edwin Ruthven Carpenter Jr. designed some of the school's original buildings.

== Sports ==
Multi-sport athlete Sam Agee, led the school to football and baseball championships.

== Heads of CMA ==
- Colonel Clifton A. Ragsdale (1931-1962)
- Colonel M.F. Gilchrist Jr. (1962–1968)
- Gilbert Edson (1968–1970)
- E. Blythe Hatcher (1970–1975, 1975-1976)
- Kim L. Barton, IV (1975)
- John Varnell (1976–1977)
- Richard W. Fly (1977–1979)

== Notable alumni ==
- Sam Agee, football player
- Jim Peebles (CMA 1938), professional football player with the Washington Redskins
- William Eldridge Odom (CMA 1950s), director of the NSA, CIA and member of the Joint Chiefs of Staff
- Captain Robert Anderson, First commander of submarine (USS Nautilus) that went under the "North Pole."
- Ingram C. Sowell, Rear admiral, USN and recipient of the Navy Cross
- Nathan Green Gordon, Medal of Honor recipient and former Lieutenant Governor of Arkansas from 1947 to 1967.
