= Sam Agee =

American football player (1915–2006)

Profile
- Position: Running back

Personal information
- Born: October 21, 1915; Courtland, Alabama
- Died: November 2, 2006 (aged 91)

Career information
- College: Vanderbilt University

Career history
- 1938–1939: Chicago Cardinals

Samuel Webster Agee Sr (October 21, 1915 – November 2, 2006) was an American football player who played running back for two seasons in the National Football League with the Chicago Cardinals. He was born in Courtland, Alabama in October 1915. He is a member of the Tennessee Sports Hall of Fame.

He went to high school at Columbia Military Academy in Columbia, Tennessee. He died in Sparta, Tennessee.

In the NFL, he played in 21 games rushing 92 times for 311 yards and two touchdowns.
