= McDonald Oden =

American football player (born 1958)

No. 84
- Position: Tight end

Personal information
- Born: March 28, 1958 (age 68); Franklin, Tennessee, U.S.
- Listed height: 6 ft 4 in (1.93 m)
- Listed weight: 234 lb (106 kg)

Career information
- High school: Spring Hill (TN)
- College: Tennessee State
- NFL draft: 1980: undrafted

Career history
- Cleveland Browns (1980–1982)
- Stats at Pro Football Reference

McDonald Oden (born March 28, 1958) is an American former professional football player who was a tight end for the Cleveland Browns of the National Football League (NFL) from 1980 to 1982. He played college football for the Tennessee State Tigers.
