= Jim Kelly (tight end, born 1951) =

American football player (born 1951)

No. 88
- Position: Tight end

Personal information
- Born: August 7, 1951 (age 75); Columbia, Tennessee, U.S.
- Listed height: 6 ft 4 in (1.93 m)
- Listed weight: 212 lb (96 kg)

Career information
- High school: Columbia Central (Columbia, Tennessee)
- College: Tennessee State (1970–1973)
- NFL draft: 1974: undrafted

Career history
- Chicago Bears (1974)
- Stats at Pro Football Reference

James William Kelly Jr. (born August 7, 1951) is an American former professional football tight end who played one season with the Chicago Bears of the National Football League. He played college football at Tennessee State University.

== Early life and college ==
James William Kelly Jr. was born on August 7, 1951, in Columbia, Tennessee. He attended Columbia Central High School in Columbia.

Kelly was a member of the Tennessee State Tigers of Tennessee State University from 1970 to 1973 and a three-year letterman from 1971 to 1973.

== Professional career ==
Kelly signed with the Chicago Bears in March 1974 after going undrafted in the 1974 NFL draft. He played in all 14 games (no starts) for the Bears during the 1974 season, catching eight passes for 100 yards. The Bears finished the year with a 4–10 record. Kelly wore jersey number 88 while with the Bears. He was released on September 9, 1975.
