= Jim Peebles (American football) =

American football player (1920–1997)

James (Mac) Peebles
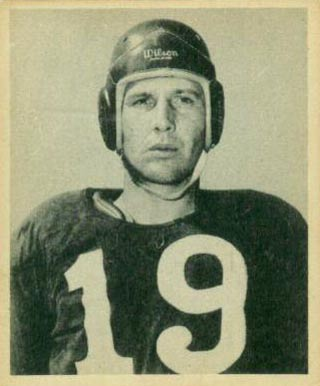
- Peebles on a 1948 Bowman football card

No. 19
- Position: End

Personal information
- Born: August 27, 1920; Culleoka, Tennessee
- Died: July 19, 1997 (aged 76)

Career information
- College: Vanderbilt

Career history
- 1946–51: Washington Redskins

James McAden Peebles (August 27, 1920 – July 19, 1997) was an American football end in the National Football League for the Washington Redskins. He played college football at Vanderbilt University.

James McAden Peebles Sr. was born in 1920 in Culleoka, Tennessee. He graduated from Columbia Military Academy in 1938. Peebles earned a B.A. from Vanderbilt University in 1942. While there he served as president of Beta Theta Pi fraternity and was selected to Omicron Delta Kappa. He excelled in athletics and served as co-captain of the Vanderbilt Commodores football team.

Following the Pearl Harbor attack, he volunteered for military service in the U.S. Army. Peebles was commissioned a captain and commanded an infantry company. He was awarded the Purple Heart for injuries sustained in combat. After the war, he was a member of the Army Europe All-Star Football Team.

Upon returning stateside, he played for the Washington Redskins from 1946 to 1951, both on offense and defense. After his professional football career, he coached at CMA, among other secondary schools. Among the coaches he played for were Charlie Hughes, CMA; Ray Morrison and Paul "Bear" Bryant, Vanderbilt and Wallace Wade, Army West All-Stars.

Peebles served as an assistant coach for the University of Maryland Terrapins from 1956 to 1957 under head coach Tommy Mont.

Peebles was a member of the Presbyterian church, the Vanderbilt alumni association, Promise Keepers, Herbert Griffin American Legion Post #19, Veterans of Foreign Wars, National Football League Players Association and the Columbia Military Academy Alumni Association.
