= Spring Hill High School (Tennessee) =

Location
- 1 Raider Lane; Columbia, Tennessee 38401; United States; 35.7164°N 86.9741°W

Information
- Type: Public high school
- Established: 1933
- School district: Maury County Board of Education
- NCES School ID: 470276000981
- Principal: Brian Brewer
- Staff: 69.83 (FTE)
- Grades: 9–12
- Enrollment: 907 (2024-2025)
- Student to teacher ratio: 17.80
- Colors: Maroon and white
- Athletics conference: TSSAA
- Team name: Raiders
- Rival: Columbia Central High School
- Website: shhs.mauryk12.org

Spring Hill High School is a public high school in Columbia, Tennessee, United States. The school is operated by Maury County Board of Education and is one of four stand-alone high schools in the district.

== History ==
Spring Hill High School was built originally in 1936 as a part of a New Deal program. In 1992, the school and its administration was moved to its current building.

== Extracurriculars ==
As of March 2026, Spring Hill High offers the following extracurriculars to its students:

- Art Club
- Band
- Bass Fishing Club
- SkillsUSA
  - Cosmetology
  - Criminal Justice
  - Mechatronics
  - Photography
- DECA
- Drama Club
- FCA
- FFA
- HOSA
- Interact Club
- Key Club
- National Honor Society
- Raider Theatre
- Science Club
- Student Council

== Athletics ==
=== Teams ===
Spring Hill's athletic teams are nicknamed the Raiders and the school's colors are maroon and white. Spring Hill teams compete in baseball/softball, bowling, boys' and girls' basketball, cross country, football, golf, rugby, soccer, swimming, tennis, track, volleyball, and wrestling. The Raiders compete in TSSAA's Division I Class 3A

Team State Titles
Year	Sport	Class	Award	Details
1986	Football	Class A	Champions	
1998	Softball	Class AA	Runner-Up	(22-9)
2004	Bowling	Division I	Runner-Up	(19-2)
2010	Baseball	Class AA	Runner-Up	(35-8)
2012	Baseball	Class AA	Runner-Up	(35-9)
2016	Baseball	Class AA	Champions	(33-8)

Individual State Titles
Year	Sport	Class	Award	Detail / Name
2013	Boys' Track and Field	Class A-AA	400 Meter Dash Champion	DeAndre Webster
2014	Boys' Track and Field	Class A-AA	400 Meter Dash Champion	DeAndre Webster

== Demographics ==
75% of the student population at Spring Hill High School identify as Caucasian, 14% identify as African American, 8% identify as Hispanic, 2% identify as Asian, 0.3% identify as Hawaiian Native/Pacific Islander, 0.1% identify as American Indian/Alaskan Native, and 0.1% identify as multiracial. The student body makeup is 54% male and 46% female.

== Notable alumni ==
- Sterling Marlin, NASCAR driver
- McDonald Oden, former NFL football player
