= White House Heritage High School =

Public school in White House, Tennessee

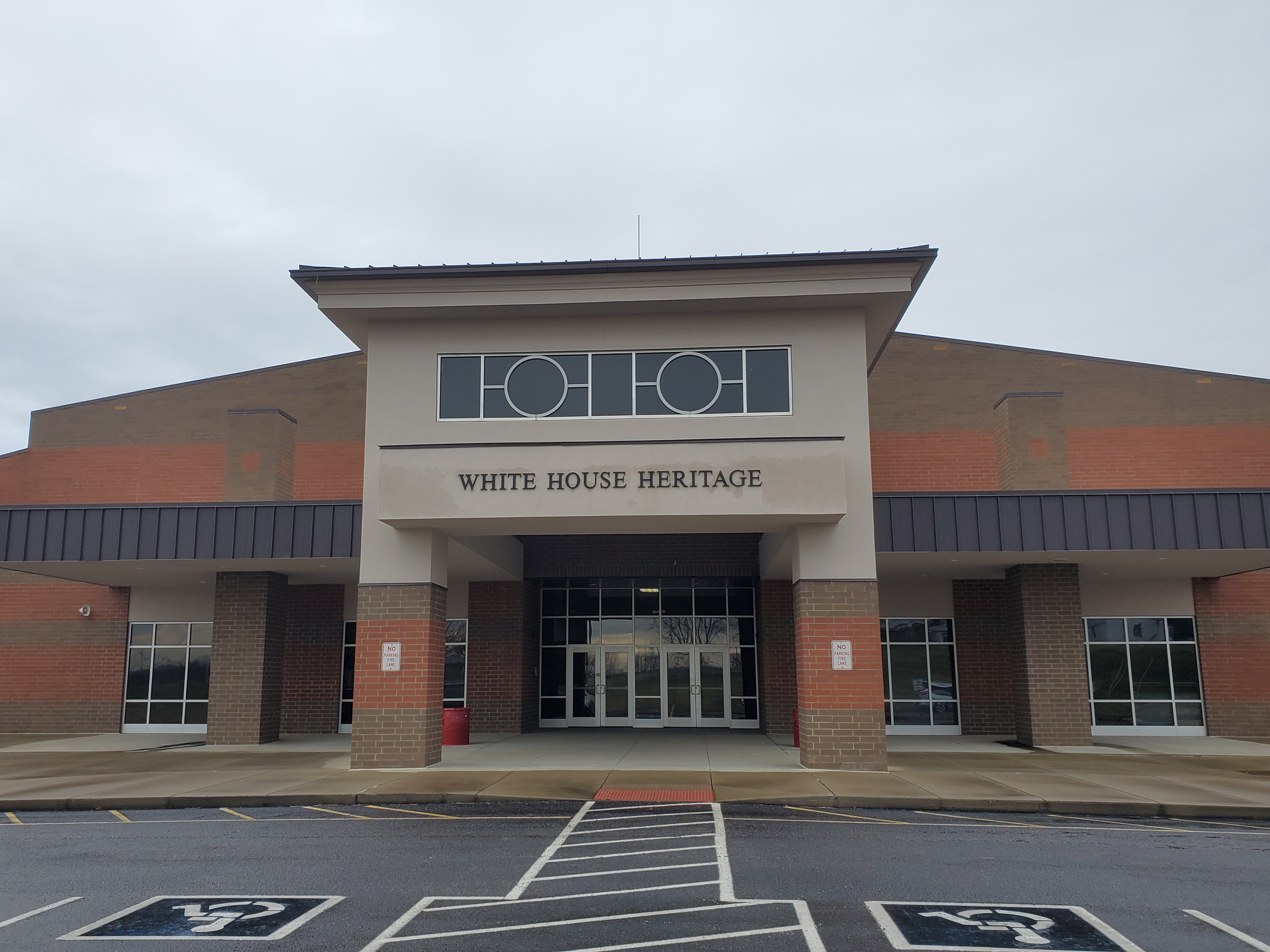
- The school's main entrance in 2020

Location
- 7744 State Highway 76, White House, Tennessee; 37188; United States; 36.4749°N 86.7034°W

Information
- Other names: WHHHS; WHH
- Type: Public high school
- Established: 2010
- School district: Robertson County Schools
- Director: Danny Weeks
- Principal: Kim Hass
- Grades: 7–12
- Enrollment: 980 (2023–24)
- Colors: Red, Navy Blue, and White
- Mascot: Patriots
- Nickname: Pats
- Website: whhs.rcstn.net

White House Heritage High School is a public high school located near White House, Tennessee. The school is operated by the Robertson County school district, and has 1,001 students from grades 7–12.

The school's construction began on July 7, 2008, it opened in August 2010. In February 2015, sixteen students were suspended after a tip led to the discovery that adderall was being used by the students. In December 2016, a teacher, Dan Deforest, was put on unpaid suspension because he "sent an inappropriate picture to a 14/15-year-old female student on Snapchat." Deforest resigned from his position on December 14, 2016. In June 2018, it was announced that Stetson Dickerson would become the school's football coach, replacing Hunter Hicks. On December 3, 2018, security was increased at White House Heritage, following a threat against the school. The threat was later determined to be from a student sent via text through an anonymous app.

On August 12, 2019, Carl Miller, who was a girls' basketball coach nearby at Greenbrier High School, became the boys' basketball coach at White House Heritage. Miller replaced Mike Petrone, who had been the team's coach from 2003 until his retirement in July.

== Athletics ==
The White House Heritage Patriots compete in the following sports:

- Baseball
- Basketball
- Bowling
- Boxing
- Cross country
- Football
- Golf
- Soccer
- Softball
- Volleyball
