= Kristian Williams (American football) =

American football player (born 2000)

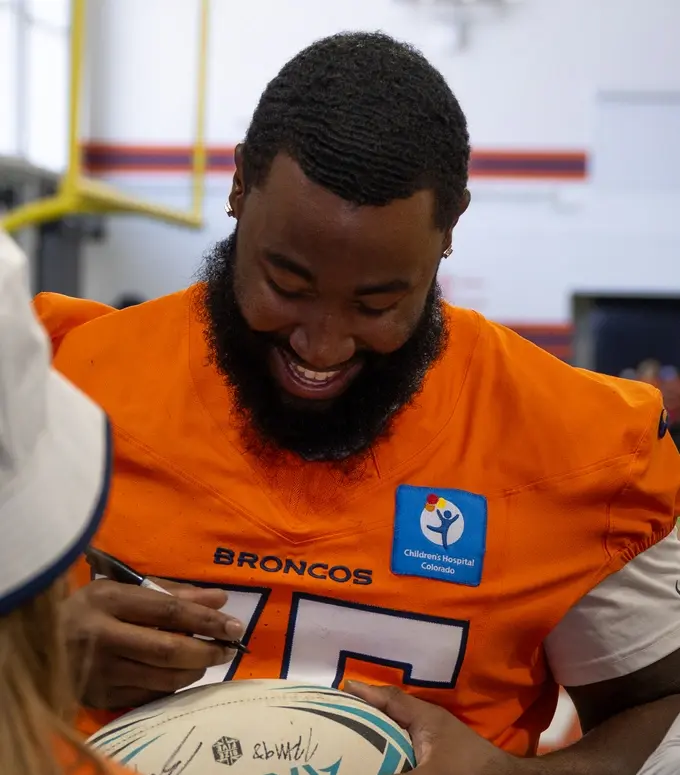
- Williams with the Denver Broncos in 2025

Profile
- Position: Defensive tackle

Personal information
- Born: December 5, 2000 (age 25); Memphis, Tennessee, U.S.
- Listed height: 6 ft 2 in (1.88 m)
- Listed weight: 295 lb (134 kg)

Career information
- High school: Southwind (Memphis)
- College: Oregon (2019–2021); Missouri (2022–2024)
- NFL draft: 2025: undrafted

Career history
- Denver Broncos (2025); Toronto Argonauts (2026)*
- * Offseason or practice squad member only
- Stats at Pro Football Reference

Kristian Williams (born December 5, 2000) is an American professional football nose tackle. He played college football for the Oregon Ducks and the Missouri Tigers. Williams was signed by the Denver Broncos as an undrafted free agent in 2025.

== Early life ==
Williams grew up in Memphis, Tennessee, attending Southwind High School in his youth. At Southwind, he helped the football team win 27 games and make three state playoff appearances. As a senior, he recorded seven sacks, 30 tackles, and three fumble recoveries and was named a 2018 first team all-state selection. Upon graduating, he was named a three-star defensive tackle prospect by ESPN.

== College career ==
=== Oregon ===
Williams eventually committed to playing football at Oregon. Over three years, he played in 24 games, starting four and totaling 25 tackles, one sack, one pass breakup, and one pressure.

=== Missouri ===
Ahead of the 2022 season, Williams transferred to Missouri. He played in all 13 games in hist first season with the Tigers, making 11 starts and logging 28 tackles, six tackles-for-loss, two sacks, one pass breakup, and two pressures. Williams followed up his 2022 campaign in 2023 with 24 tackles, four tackles-for-loss, two pass breakups, one pressure, one forced fumble, and one fumble recovery across 13 games and 11 starts. In 2024, Williams was named a team captain. In his final season at Missouri, Williams started all 13 games and recorded 30 tackles, two tackles-for-loss, one sack, one pass breakup, four pressures, and a forced fumble.

== Professional career ==
Pre-draft measurables
Height	Weight	Arm length	Hand span	Wingspan	40-yard dash	10-yard split	20-yard split	20-yard shuttle	Three-cone drill	Vertical jump	Broad jump	Bench press
6 ft 1 5/8 in (1.87 m)	296 lb (134 kg)	32 in (0.81 m)	10 1/8 in (0.26 m)	6 ft 6 1/2 in (1.99 m)	5.10 s	1.75 s	2.94 s	4.76 s	7.44 s	27.5 in (0.70 m)	9 ft 1 in (2.77 m)	31 reps
All values from Pro Day

=== Denver Broncos ===
Williams with the Broncos in 2026

After going unselected in the 2025 NFL draft, Williams signed with the Denver Broncos as an undrafted free agent on May 9, 2025. On August 26, he was designated as waived/injured. A day later, he reverted to injured reserve. On September 8, Williams was waived from injured reserve with an injury settlement.

On January 29, 2026, Williams signed a reserve/futures contract with the Broncos after spending the majority of the 2025 season as a free agent. On August 30, he was waived by the Broncos as a part of final roster cuts.

=== Toronto Argonauts ===
On September 27, 2026, Williams signed with the Toronto Argonauts of the Canadian Football League (CFL). On October 15, he was released.
