= Tennessee School for the Blind =

Coordinates: 36.1676°N 86.6538°W

Location
- 115 Stewarts Ferry Pike; Nashville, (Davidson County), Tennessee 37214; United States

Information
- Type: K-12 Public School
- Principal: Jamie Ballard
- Staff: 29.00 (FTE)
- Enrollment: 127 (2022-23)
- Student to teacher ratio: 4.38
- Colors: Royal blue and gold
- Nickname: Tigers

Tennessee School for the Blind (Braille: ⠠⠠⠠⠞⠢⠰⠎⠑⠑⠀⠎⠡⠕⠕⠇⠀⠿⠀⠮⠀⠃⠇⠠⠄, TSB, ⠞⠎⠃) is a K–12 public school for blind children in Donelson, Nashville, Tennessee. First founded as a small private school in 1843 by Reverend James Champlin, it was soon established as a state school for the blind in 1844. It is overseen by the Tennessee Department of Education.

== History ==
Tennessee School for the Blind founder Rev. James Champlin was born in 1920 in Bean Station, Tennessee and grew up in Overton County.

From 1944 to 1965, Black students attended the Tennessee School for the Blind at the Rolling Mill Hill campus at 88 Hermitage Avenue, just south of downtown Nashville. White students continued to study at the Claiborne House until 1952, when a new campus was constructed on the Clover Bottom Farm in Donelson, TN. The State of Tennessee purchased the Clover Bottom Farm for $150,000 in 1949 and set aside acreage for the construction of the new campus. The state began development for the new buildings in 1952 and housed school staff in the Clover Bottom Mansion.

When the school racially integrated in 1965, about 30 Black students integrated with about 150 white students at the Clover Bottom campus, leaving the 2.6 acre Rolling Mill Hill campus empty.

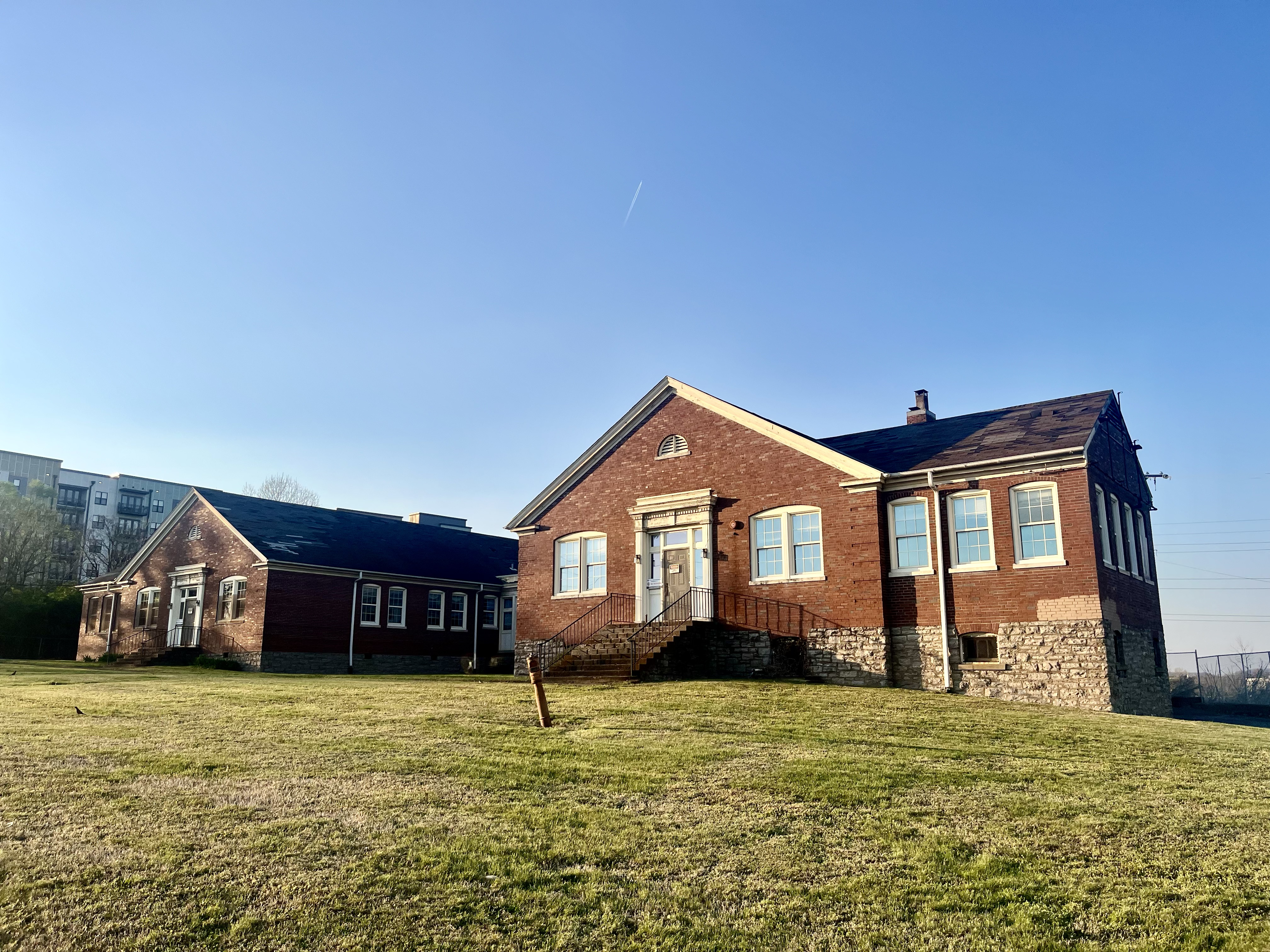
The last remaining building on Rolling Mill Hill campus, 88 Hermitage Ave, Nashville, TN.

The State of Tennessee continued to own the disused Rolling Mill Hill campus. Alumni of the Tennessee School for the Blind argued for preserving the building after the Nashville Metropolitan government made a proposal to demolish the 17,000 square-foot building with the intention to build the Nashville School of the Arts on the property. In 2017 the Tennessee Historical Commission ruled that it was eligible to be a historic property. Historic Nashville Inc. made efforts to help preserve the property. In 2022, Nashville's Metro Council approved the $20.3 million purchase of the property from the state. A feasibility study of the building was conducted in 2023 to assess its potential reuse.

== Campus ==
While the school has dormitory facilities, students are not required to live on campus. Residential eligibility is determined by the student's age, distance between their legal residence and the school, and their level of care needed. Youth Service Workers provide care and guidance for the students outside of class instruction time, with 2-5 staff in each residential cottage.

Student activities offered include track, goalball, wrestling, cheerleading, swimming, forensics, and golf. In September 2025, the school hosted the North Central Association of Schools for the Blind Track Championships for more than 100 blind student-athletes from 12 states.

== See also ==
- Tennessee School for the Deaf
- West Tennessee School for the Deaf
