= East Ridge High School (Tennessee) =

High school in Tennessee, United States

Coordinates: 34.9880°N 85.2454°W

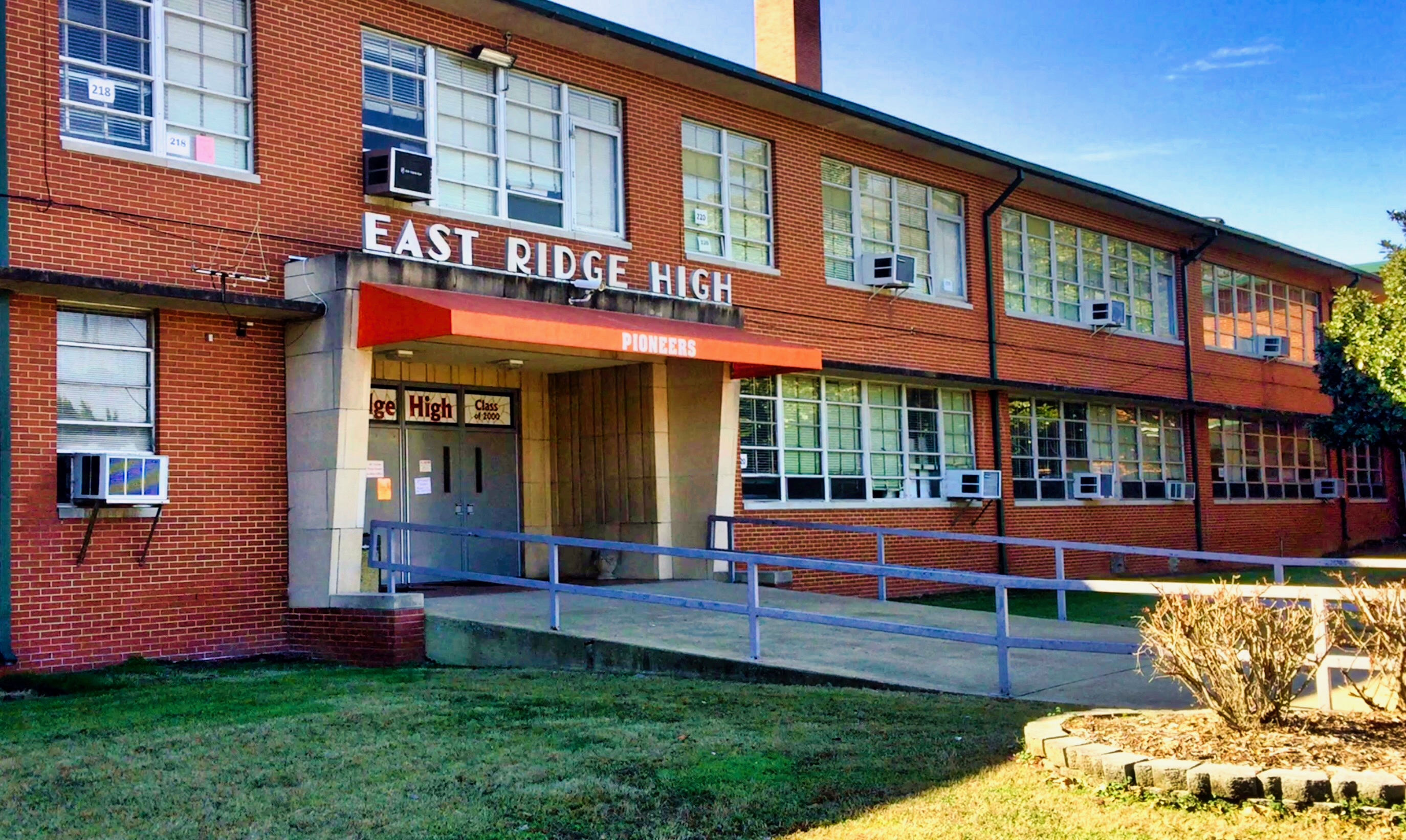

Location
- 4320 Bennett Road; Chattanooga, (Hamilton County), Tennessee 37412; United States

Information
- Type: Public high school
- Principal: Juan Moreno
- Staff: 65.47 (FTE)
- Enrollment: 928 (2023-2024)
- Student to teacher ratio: 14.17
- Colors: Orange and white
- Nickname: Pioneers

East Ridge High School is a public high school in the Hamilton County Schools system located in the Chattanooga, Tennessee suburb of East Ridge.

East Ridge High School is a Title I school and the demographics as of the 22-23 school year are as follows: Hispanic or Latino students make up 47.8% of the school's population, African American students make up 24.8%, Caucausian students make up 20.3%, with Asian and Pacific-Islander and Native American students being represented in smaller numbers.

== History ==
By fall 1954 East Ridge High School had grown so much that the sixth grade was holding classes at the town hall and in basements of local churches. The overcrowding was partially alleviated by the opening of the $600,000 East Ridge Junior High School that December, but the town hall continued to hold classes for four more years.

The Hamilton County Board of Education voted in March 1957 to buy 28 acres along Bennett Road from former East Ridge mayor Foy Crabtree to build a new high school. The school opened with 15 classrooms, a cafeteria, a gymnasium, and an auditorium. The high school was dedicated in 1959 and added a new wing and a football stadium the same year. East Ridge High held its first commencement June 1, 1961, on Shanks Field with 113 graduates. The school yearbook was The Musket and the newspaper was The Powder Horn.

A fire destroyed the ROTC building at the school in August 1970 and a new one was built the following year. A baseball field was added in 1976, a track in 1978, a vocational building in 1980, tennis courts the following year, and a new gym in 1986. Enrollment hit 1,000 by the mid-1980s. The high school instituted a dress code in 1993. Students protested and 29 were suspended.

== Principals ==
1. Fred Jackson
2. J.R. Rodman
3. B.E. Stephens
4. Jean Stephens
5. Mack Franklin
6. Ed Woodham
7. Ed Foster
8. Wade Kelley
9. Mark Bean
10. Cheri Dedmon
11. Zac Brown
12. Tammy Helton
13. Crystal Sorrells
14. Juan Moreno
