= Clover Bottom Mansion =

Historic house in Tennessee, United States

- Clover Bottom Farm
- U.S. National Register of Historic Places
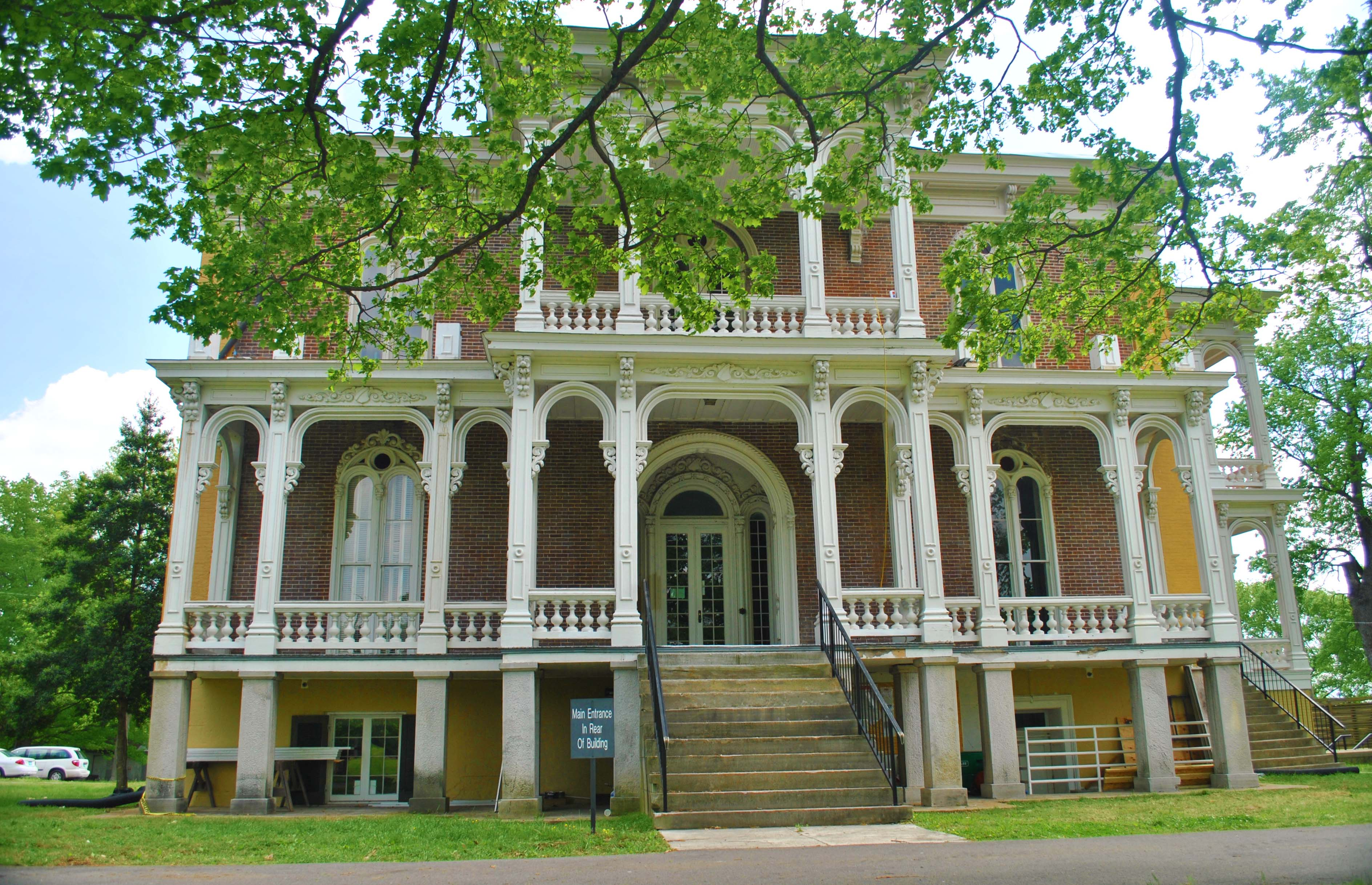

- Location within Tennessee Location within the United States
- Location: 2941 Lebanon Pike, Nashville, Tennessee, U.S.
- Coordinates: 36°10′11″N 86°38′58″W
- Area: less than one acre
- Built: 1858
- Architectural style: Italianate
- NRHP reference No.: 75001747 (original); 100003900 (increase)

Significant dates
- Added to NRHP: April 3, 1975
- Boundary increase: May 7, 2019

The Clover Bottom Mansion is a historic mansion located in Nashville, Tennessee, United States. For 30 years it has been the home of the Tennessee Historical Commission, the State Historic Preservation Office.

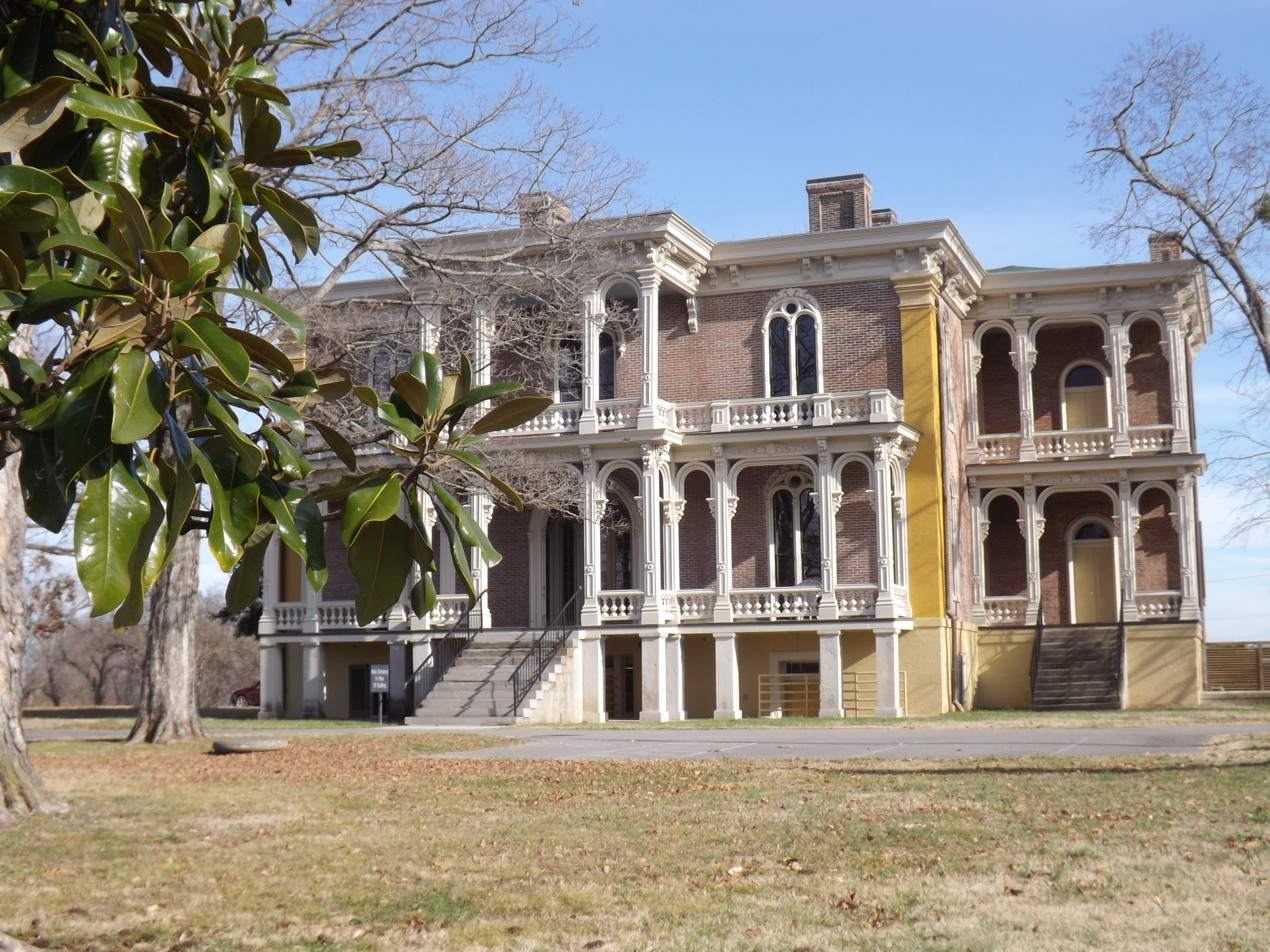
Clover Bottom Mansion.

== History ==
Clover Bottom Mansion occupies land on the Stones River first claimed in 1780 by John Donelson, who abandoned his homestead following an Indian attack. The mansion was built in 1859 and was the centerpiece of the 1,500-acre Clover Bottom Plantation, incorporating portions of a Greek Revival-style house that had been built by the Hoggatts in 1853 and was destroyed by fire on February 7, 1859.

The mansion was built near Nashville's first horseracing track for Dr James and Mary Ann Saunders Hoggatt, who owned sixty enslaved residents in 1860. Mrs. Hoggatt was a granddaughter of Daniel Smith. Her half-brothers from her mother's first marriage were Rachel and Andrew Jackson's nephews Andrew Jackson Donelson and Daniel Smith Donelson, for whom Ft. Donelson was named. The mansion was constructed in the Italianate style. A strong similarity to nearby Two Rivers Mansion that was being erected around the same time suggests that the same unknown contractor and/or architect was used, although no supporting records have been found. The interior of the home had French scenic Zuber wallpaper, and the parlor had a frescoed ceiling. Clover Bottom Plantation was where John McCline was held captive as a slave, in his childhood, and who escaped from the property in 1862 and became a drover for the Union Army. McCline's autobiography "Slavery in the Clover Bottoms" provides a very rare and detailed account of the life of a Davidson County slave prior to and during the early days of the Civil War. A Tennessee Civil War Trails marker was erected on the property in 2015 detailing the story of McCline. Dr. Hoggatt died in 1863, and the home was occupied at different times during the Civil War by soldiers from both armies.

Clover Bottom Mansion is associated with two members of Congress. The first was Mrs. Hoggatt's brother-in-law, the former U.S. and Confederate Congressman Meredith P. Gentry. After his first wife (Mrs. Hoggatt's sister) died, Rep. Gentry's daughters lived with the Hoggatts while he pursued a career in politics. Ultimately Gentry was left destitute from selling his own property and enthusiastically investing his money in the Confederacy. Gentry moved into the home and died at Clover Bottom on November 2, 1866. In 1886 Mrs. Hoggatt sold her property to a relative, Andrew Price. Mr. Price, married to Anna Gay Price, was a four-term congressman from Louisiana who had Tennessee roots. In an early expression of historic preservation, Price restored the home and added several substantial outbuildings, raising thoroughbred horses on the property.

In 1918, A.F. Stanford purchased the house. Mr. Stanford's second wife, Merle Hutcheson Stanford Davis (1907–2011), moved there in 1927 owned it until she sold it to the state of Tennessee in 1948. Mrs. Davis, who lived to be 104, made her final visit to her old home just a few months prior to her death in 2011. The house had a number of uses after being acquired by the State, including a brief period as a state trooper outpost. It was later converted into housing for faculty for the Tennessee School for the Blind. Around 1980 the home was vacated and left empty, beginning an unfortunate period of neglect that lasted about a decade. An effort led by Edward Nave and fellow members of the local Association for the Preservation of Tennessee Antiquities helped convince the State to restore it. It has been the home of the Tennessee Historical Commission, the State Historic Preservation Office, since October, 1994. The property contains several important historic outbuildings, including two former c. 1858 slave cabins that are among a handful of former slave dwellings remaining in Davidson County. There is also an 1850s carriage house that may slightly predate the main house. The c. 1890s transverse crib thoroughbred horse barn is one of the finest 19th-century barns remaining in the area. At the initiative of the Tennessee Historical Commission, the historic outbuildings were restored by the State in 2015–16 and interpretive signs were added. Over 150 trees of native species were planted, and a walking trail was added. The grounds are open to the public during daylight hours. Tours of the office (which has no period furnishings or exhibits) are unavailable as of October, 2024.

== Architectural significance ==
It was listed on the National Register of Historic Places on April 3, 1975. in 2019, the listing was updated by the Tennessee Historical Commission and the boundaries enlarged to include the outbuildings and it was renamed from Clover Bottom Mansion to Clover Bottom Farm.
