= Battle Creek High School (Tennessee) =

Public secondary school in Spring Hill, Tennessee, United States

Location
- 130 Battle Creek Way; Spring Hill, Tennessee; United States; 35.7061°N 86.9213°W

Information
- Other names: BCHS
- Type: Public high school
- Established: 2024
- School district: Maury County Public Schools
- NCES School ID: 470276010504
- Grades: 9–11 (will be 9–12 by 2026)
- Enrollment: 402 (2024-2025)
- Colors: Navy, grey, and white
- Athletics conference: TSSAA
- Mascot: Grizzlies
- Website: bchs.mauryk12.org

Battle Creek High School is a public high school in Spring Hill, Tennessee. Battle Creek is a part of the Maury County Public Schools district.

== History ==
By 2019, several Maury County high schools were at overcapacity. In response, planning for a new high school began shortly after Battle Creek Elementary and Middle Schools opened. An official funding proposal for a new high school was unveiled in March 2021. In February 2022, the Maury County School Board voted to name the new school Battle Creek High School. Battle Creek High School opened on August 5, 2024, serving grades 9, 10, 11, and 12th

== Athletics ==
Battle Creek High School's mascot and athletic teams are known as the Grizzlies. As of 2025, the school offers baseball/softball, boys' and girls' basketball, cheerleading, cross country, football, soccer, volleyball, and track and field. The school competes in TSSAA's athletic district 6
