= Hal Wantland =

American football player (1944–2008)

No. 46
- Position: Defensive back

Personal information
- Born: July 29, 1944; Columbia, Tennessee, U.S.
- Died: April 8, 2008 (aged 63); Knoxville, Tennessee, U.S.
- Listed height: 6 ft 0 in (1.83 m)
- Listed weight: 195 lb (88 kg)

Career information
- High school: Columbia (TN) Central
- College: Tennessee
- NFL draft: 1966: 16th round, 235th overall pick

Career history
- Miami Dolphins (1966)
- Stats at Pro Football Reference

Hal Wantland (July 9, 1944 – April 8, 2008) was an American football defensive back. He played for the Miami Dolphins in 1966. He was originally drafted by Washington in the 16th round of the 1966 NFL Draft with the 235th overall pick.

He died on April 8, 2008, in Knoxville, Tennessee at age 63.
