= Tennessee School for the Deaf =

School in Knoxville, Tennessee, U.S.

Tennessee Schools for the Deaf

Location
- 2725 Island Home BLVD; Knoxville, TN; Knoxville, Tennessee 37920

Information
- Established: 1844
- Superintendent: Sandra Edwards
- Chief Academic Officer: Jessica McMahon
- Knoxville (TSDK) Principals: Amy Locke (ES) and Amy Portier (US)
- Nashville (TSDN) Principal: Kim Baggett
- Jackson (WTSD) Principal: Kristi Lindsey
- Employees: 215
- Primary years taught: PK–12+
- Enrollment: 190
- Language: American Sign Language (ASL), English
- Campuses: Knoxville, Nashville, Jackson
- Colors: Purple and white
- Sports: Football, Volleyball, Cheerleading, Cross Country, Basketball, Swimming, Track & Field.
- Team name: Vikings

The Tennessee Schools for the Deaf (TSD) is a state-operated residential and day school for deaf and hard-of-hearing students who reside in the state of Tennessee ranging from pre-kindergarten to grade 12 and also includes a Comprehensive Adult Program. The main campus is located in Knoxville, Tennessee, within the historic Island Home Park neighborhood. There are two additional campuses serving elementary students in Nashville and Jackson.

== History ==
General John Alexander Cocke introduced legislation establishing Tennessee School for the Deaf that was passed by the House on January 29, 1844. Revered Thomas MacIntire who was a highly recommended teacher from what is now the Ohio School for the Deaf was selected to lead the school as principal and teacher. He opened the school on April 14, 1845, and the first students began class on the first Monday of June 1845.

When the school for the Deaf was first established in Tennessee in 1845, it was named Tennessee Asylum for the Deaf and Dumb. The original school location would be one-room school house with 6 students. The schoolhouse was first moved a few years after its founding to a larger tract of land near Broadway and Summit Hill Drive. After brief closure due to civil war, Tennessee Asylum for the Deaf and Dumb relocated to current location at Island Home and renamed itself. The school changed its name to Tennessee School for the Deaf in 1924.

== Academics ==
TSD offers several programs ranging from infants to post high school. Those programs include Outreach, including the Deaf Mentor & Parent Advisor Program, Toddler Learning Classes, Preschool, Elementary, Upper School (Middle and High School), and Comprehensive Adult Program. The Deaf Mentor & Parent Advisor Program works closely with parents and their deaf or hard of hearing children from ages 0 to 5. When a child can sit up, he or she can enroll at TSD in the Toddler Learning Class at either the Knoxville or Nashville campus. Preschool and Pre-Kindergarten works with children from 3 years old up until Kindergarten. Elementary provides academics and activities for Kindergarten through 6th grade students. Upper School hosts grades 7 through 12 including several exciting CTE programs. The Comprehensive Adult Program provides occupational and independent living educational experiences for older students until they age out of public education.

== Athletics ==
The Tennessee School for the Deaf is a part of the Tennessee Secondary School Athletic Association. It fields high school sports teams in football, volleyball, cheerleading, cross-country running, basketball, swimming, and track and field, which compete against public school teams as well as teams from other schools for the deaf. Cheerleading is also included in the athletic program. They are also a member of the Mason Dixon Schools for the Deaf Athletic Association.

== Residency ==
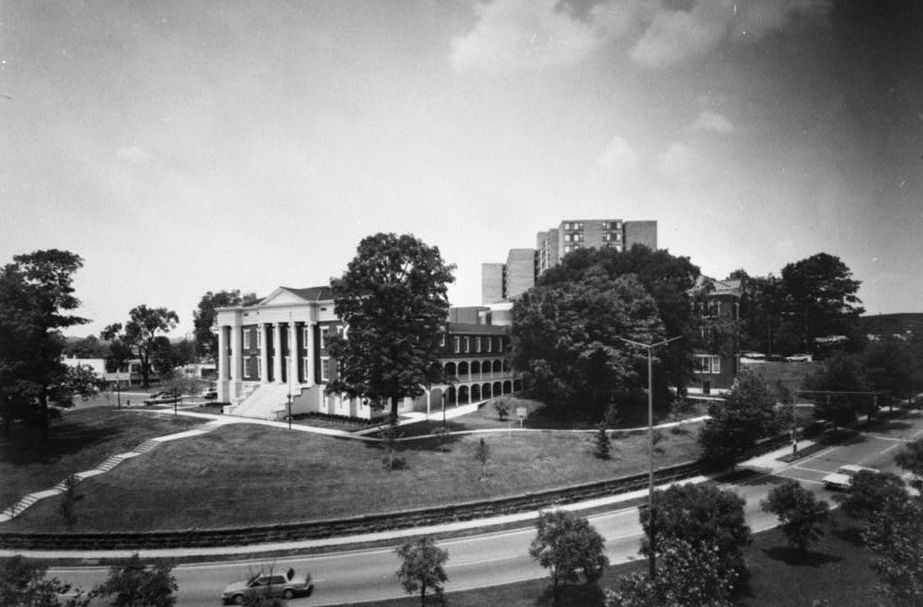
Old City Hall in Knoxville, Tennessee, US. This building was constructed in 1840s for the Tennessee School for the Deaf, which occupied it until it moved to its Island Home campus. The building then served as Knoxville City Hall until 1980. It currently houses a law school for Lincoln Memorial University.

Since students come from all over the state of Tennessee to the Knoxville campus, TSD is a residential school. The school system has a new dormitory (2023) to house the students. Children aged 3–21 are allowed, with specific limitations, to reside on campus. Students arrive on Sundays and depart on Fridays. Dorm rooms are for students who live far enough not to be able to travel by bus every day to school, typically those students who exceed 60–90 minute one way trip. There are separate dorm houses for male and female students. TSD's residential program offers extracurricular activities, peer interaction, student growth and development, achievement, and more.

== See also ==
- West Tennessee School for the Deaf
- Tennessee School for the Blind
