= Maury County Public Schools =

School district in Tennessee, United States

Maury County Department of Education

Location
- Maury County, Tennessee United States

District information
- Type: Public
- Established: 1873
- Director of Schools: Lisa Ventura
- Schools: 21
- Budget: 88 million (USD)

Students and staff
- Students: 12,259
- Teachers: 825

Other information
- Teachers' unions: Tennessee Education Association
- Website: www.mauryk12.org

Maury County Public Schools (MCPS) is a school district headquartered in Columbia, Tennessee. It serves Maury County, the sole school district doing so.

The Maury County Board of Education is an 11-member school board governing the district. According to the Tennessee Code Annotated, the local board of education is a policy-making legislative body, and its members are classified as officials of the state. Except during an official meeting, a board member has no more power, authority or jurisdiction over school matters than any other citizen in the community.

== Schools ==
=== Unit schools ===
- Santa Fe Unit School
- Hampshire Unit School
- Culleoka Unit School

=== High schools ===
- Spring Hill High School
- Columbia Central High School
- Mt. Pleasant High School
- Battle Creek High School

=== Junior/Middle Schools ===
- E. A. Cox Middle school
- Whitthorne Middle School
- Mt. Pleasant Middle School of the Visual and Performing Arts
- Spring Hill Middle School
- Battle Creek Middle School

=== Elementary schools ===
- Highland Park Elementary School
- Spring Hill Elementary School
- J. R. Baker Elementary School
- Joseph Brown Elementary School
- Randolph Howell Elementary School
- McDowell Elementary School (Permanently Closed)
- Mt. Pleasant Elementary School
- Riverside Elementary School
- J. E. Woodard Elementary School
- Marvin Wright Elementary School
- Battle Creek Elementary School

== Controversy ==
=== Hatton v. County Board of Education of Maury County, Tennessee (1970) ===
In 1968 Florence Ella Hatton was a tenured African-American elementary school teacher at Macedonia Negro School; she had been working for the school system for about six years and had an undergraduate degree from Tennessee State University and state certification. Employed by Maury County Board of Education, she had received tenure in 1966. In a position funded by Title One money from the federal government, intended to aid lower income students, Hatton served as fourth-grade homeroom teacher, instructor of health and physical education, and social studies, and as a part-time librarian at the school. Two days before the start of school in 1968, she was discharged, told that the district had lost Title I funds and had to cut her position.

Learning that the Board had hired non-tenured white teachers for other positions after she was discharged, Hatton filed a suit in the United States District Court for the Middle District of Tennessee for protection under the Due Process Clause of the Fourteenth Amendment, seeking reinstatement and back pay. In this court proceeding, the District Court learned that the Maury County Board of Education had not fully implemented desegregation, as required by Brown v. Board of Education, 347 U.S. 483 (1954) in 1954. The court found that the Board's "freedom of choice" plan had not achieved sufficient desegregation and in 1969 ordered the Board of Education to create a plan to achieve that. The school district's plan had to be approved by the District Court and was submitted to the Appeals Court when the County School Board appealed the lower court's decision. The District Court ruled that Hatton was not discharged because of race, accepting the Board's statement that she was discharged because she was incompetent, but the Appeals Court reversed this decision, as Hatton had been employed for six years and had earned tenure without any objections. It found that the Board had never filed papers to support the claim of incompetence. In addition, white non-tenured teachers had been hired after Hatton was discharged, although the District had claimed not to have funds for any position that she might fill. Under the state's tenure policy, tenured teachers have preference for open positions before non-tenured ones.

In February 1970 the United States Court of Appeals, Sixth Circuit ruled against the Maury County Board of Education. It awarded Hatton with reinstatement of employment with the county, as well as back-pay for the time off, and costs of court proceedings. This case was important to civil rights in Tennessee, as it brought a secretly noncompliant school district into the public spotlight, forcing it to desegregate 16 years after the Supreme Court had ruled that segregated public schools were unconstitutional.

==== Cases cited in decision ====
- Green v. County School Board of New Kent County, 391 U.S. 430, 88 S.Ct. 1689, 20 L.Ed.2d 716 (1968)
- Hobson v. Hansen, 44 F.R.D. 18 (D.D.C. 1968)
- Raney v. Board of Education of Gould School District, 391 U.S. 443, 88 S.Ct. 1697, 20 L.Ed.2d 727 (1968)
- Monroe v. Board of Commissioners of Jackson, Tenn., 391 U.S. 450, 88 S.Ct. 1700, 20 L.Ed.2d 733 (1968)
- Brown v. Board of Education, 347 U.S. 483, 74 S.Ct. 686, 98 L.Ed. 873 (1954)
- Brown v. Board of Education, 349 U.S. 294, 75 S.Ct. 753, 99 L.Ed. 1083 (1955)
- Stell v. Savannah-Chatham County Board of Education, 333 F.2d 55, 60 (5th Cir.) 379 U.S. 933, 85 S.Ct. 332, 13 L.Ed.2d 344 (1964)
- St. Helena Parish School Board v. Hall, 287 F.2d 376 (5th Cir.), 368 U.S. 830, 82 S.Ct. 52, 7 L.Ed.2d 33 (1961)

== See also ==
- Maury County, Tennessee
