= Campbell County Comprehensive High School =

Location
- 150 Cougar Lane; Jacksboro, Tennessee 37757; United States; 36°21′04″N 84°08′52″W

Information
- Type: Public high school
- Established: 1975
- School district: Campbell County Public Schools
- NCES School ID: 470042000117
- Principal: Brad Collette
- Teaching staff: 80.25 (on an FTE basis)
- Grades: 9–12
- Enrollment: 1,201 (2023-2024)
- Student to teacher ratio: 14.97
- Colors: Orange and Blue
- Mascot: Cougar
- Website: cchs.campbell.k12.tn.us

Campbell County Comprehensive High School is a public high school near Jacksboro, Tennessee, United States. It was established in 1975 and is part of the Campbell County Public Schools district.

== History ==
The school began operation in 1975, serving the populations formerly served by separate high schools in Jacksboro and LaFollette. Initially it enrolled grades 10–12; grade 9 was added in the 1983–84 school year.

=== 2005 shooting ===
On November 8, 2005, student Kenneth Bartley Jr. shot and killed assistant principal Ken Bruce and wounded two other school administrators after they confronted him about having a gun in the school.
