= Greenbrier High School (Tennessee) =

Location
- 126 Cuniff Street; Greenbrier, Tennessee 37073; United States; 36°25′24″N 86°48′14″W

Information
- Type: Public
- School district: Robertson County Schools
- NCES School ID: 470360001497
- Principal: Katie Osborne
- Teaching staff: 51.64 (on FTE basis)
- Grades: 9–12
- Enrollment: 789 (2023–2024)
- Student to teacher ratio: 15.28
- Colors: Forest green and white
- Nickname: Bobcats
- Website: GHS

Greenbrier High School is a public high school located in Greenbrier, Tennessee, United States. It is part of Robertson County Schools. The school educates 842 students in grades 9 to 12.
