= Lookout Valley Middle High School =

School in Chattanooga, Tennessee

Lookout Valley Middle School and High School

Location
- 350 Lookout High Street; Chattanooga, Hamilton, Tennessee 37419; United States
- Coordinates: 35.0332°N 85.3662°W

Information
- Funding type: Public
- Motto: Small School, Big Opportunities!
- Established: 1957
- Status: Open
- School district: Hamilton County Schools
- Principal: Lee Ann McBryar
- Teaching staff: 25.50 (FTE)
- Grades: 6–12
- Student to teacher ratio: 12.47
- Sports: Football, Basketball, Baseball, Tennis, Soccer, Archery
- Mascot: Yellow Jackets
- Website: https://lvmhs.hcde.org/

Lookout Valley Middle School and High School is a school in Chattanooga, Tennessee, in Hamilton County. It is operated by the Hamilton County Schools system.

== History ==
Lookout Valley Junior High School was established in 1957 as the community grew. Lookout Valley Jr. High eventually became Lookout Valley High School, graduating its first class in 1973. In 1989, sixth grade was added when two elementary schools combined; Valley View Elementary School (Lookout Valley Elementary) and John A. Patten Elementary School.

== Leadership ==
In fall 2020, Lee Ann McBryar became the principal.

=== List of principals ===
This is a partial list of former school principals with term start and end dates.

- Dr. Lee McDade ( – 2011)
- Rick Rushworth (2011, retired in 2018)
- Todd Stinson (2018 – )

== Notable alumni ==
- Mike Cameron – Politician. Member of Georgia House of Representatives.
