= Columbia Central High School (Columbia, Tennessee) =

Location
- 921 Lion Parkway; Columbia, Maury County, Tennessee 38401; United States; 35.61504°N 87.08027°W

Information
- School board: Maury County Board of Education
- NCES School ID: 470276000964
- Teaching staff: 82.83 (on an FTE basis)
- Grades: 9-12
- Student to teacher ratio: 17.01
- Colors: Purple, white, and gold
- Fight song: Hail To The Redskins
- Mascot: Leo Lion
- Team name: Lions
- Rival: Spring Hill, Tullahoma
- Website: chs.mauryk12.org

Columbia Central High School is a public high school in Columbia, Tennessee, United States. The school is operated by Maury County Board of Education, and is the largest school within its district.

== Extracurriculars ==
As of March 2026, Columbia Central High School offers the following extracurriculars to its student body:

- Art Club
- Best Buddies High Schools
- Beta Club
- National Honor Society
- SkillsUSA
- Criminal Justice Organization of CCHS
- DECA
- Elevating Young Minds (Cultural club)
- FBLA
- FCA
- FFA
- HOSA
- Interact Club
- Key Club
- Model United Nations
- Youth in Government
- Mu Alpha Theta
- Peace in Action
- Photography Club
- Science Club
- Student Council
- Stylus Writers' Workshop
- Theatre Club

== Athletics ==
Columbia Central offers baseball/softball, boys' and girls' basketball, bowling, cross country, football, golf, soccer, tennis, track and field, volleyball, wrestling. Their athletic teams are known as the Lions and Lady Lions for the perspective boys' and girls' teams. The Lions and Lady Lions compete in TSSAA's Division I Class 4A.

Team Titles
Year	Sport	Class	Award	Detail
1937	Boys' Basketball		Runner-Up	
1952	Football		Champions	
1992	Boys' Basketball	Class AAA	Runner-Up	(33-3)
1993	Boys' Basketball	Class AAA	Runner-Up	(29-6)
1999	Boys' Basketball	Class AAA	Runner-Up	(35-2)
2001	Softball	Class AAA	Runner-Up	(26-17)
2004	Girls' Bowling	Division I	Champions	(18-0)
2005	Bowling	Division I	Runner-Up	(16-3)
2008	Bowling	Division I	Champions	(24-1)
2009	Football	Class 5A	Runner-Up	(13-2)
2010	Football	Class 5A	Champions	(13-2)
2011	Baseball	Class AAA	Runner-Up	(28-8)
2011	Girls' Bowling	Division I	Runner-Up	(18-5)
2012	Bowling	Division I	Runner-Up	(21-1)
2012	Football	Class 5A	Runner-Up	(12-3)
2013	Bowling	Division I	Champions	(24-0)
2014	Bowling	Division I	Champions	(24-3)
2014	Girls' Bowling	Division I	Runner-Up	(23-4)
2015	Bowling	Division I	Champions	(26-2)
2016	Bowling	Division I	Champions	(22-4)

Individual Titles
Year	Sport	Class	Award	Detail / Name
2001	Boys' Track and Field	Class AAA	Long Jump Champion	Joey Knight
2007	Bowling	Division I	Runner-Up	Garrett Flatt
2008	Bowling	Division I	Champion	Michael Poirier
2014	Bowling	Division I	Champion	Cole Flatt
2015	Bowling	Division I	Champion	Cole Flatt
2016	Bowling	Division I	Champion	Luke Flatt
2016	Bowling	Division I	Runner-Up	Johnathan Colbaugh
2017	Bowling	Division I	Runner-Up	Cole Flatt
2024	Bowling	Division I	Champion	William Davis
2025	Bowling	Division I	Runner-Up	William Davis

== Notable alumni ==
- Dimeco Childress (class of 1998) — former college basketball player
- Jaden Hamm (class of 2020) – baseball player
- Jim Kelly — football player
- Holly M. Kirby — Justice, Tennessee Supreme Court
- Shaq Mason — National Football League player, New England Patriots
- Lindsey Nelson — radio and television sportscaster
- Percy Priest — politician, journalist, teacher
- Eddie Pye — Major League Baseball player
- Dan Uggla — Major League Baseball player
- Hal Wantland — football player
