= Campbell County Public Schools (Tennessee) =

School district in Tennessee, United States

Location
- P.O. Box 445, 522 Main Street; Jacksboro, Tennessee 37757 United States
- Coordinates: 36.3307°N 84.1819°W

District information
- Superintendent: Jennifer Fields; Director of Schools

Other information
- Website: http://www.campbell.k12.tn.us/

Campbell County Public Schools is a school district which serves Campbell County, Tennessee, United States. It is based in Jacksboro, Tennessee.

== Schools ==
- Campbell County Comprehensive High School
- Caryville Elementary School
- Elk Valley Elementary School
- Jacksboro Elementary School
- Jacksboro Middle School
- Jellico Elementary School
- Jellico High School
- LaFollette Elementary School
- LaFollette Middle School
- Valley View Elementary School
- White Oak Elementary School
- Wynn Habersham Elementary School
