= West Tennessee School for the Deaf =

Public school in Jackson, Tennessee, US

Coordinates: 35.6456°N 88.7885°W

West Tennessee School for the Deaf (WTSD) is a public state-operated elementary school serving in Preschool thought 6th grade and is a campus of the Tennessee Schools for the Deaf. It is an agency of the Division of Special Schools of the Tennessee State Department of Education. It is located in Jackson, Tennessee.

As of 2005 the school has about 60 students, who originate from West Tennessee.

== History ==
Prior to the school's establishment, the Tennessee School for the Deaf was the only school for deaf children in Tennessee. In 1972 James McKinney, the speaker of the Tennessee House of Representatives, filed a bill that asked for the Tennessee state government to purchase the campus of Union University in Jackson, Tennessee, so a school for deaf children could be established in western Tennessee. The city of Memphis was also seeking to be the location of the school for the deaf.

The school opened in its current location in the northern hemisphere fall of 1986.

As of 2005 the 11-acre (4.5 ha) campus had eight classrooms and two dormitories. The school was to receive a $1.4 million expansion of 11,139 square feet (1,034.8 m^{2}) of space with the beginning of construction scheduled for September of October 2005 and the end scheduled for the northern hemisphere fall of 2006. The expansion included a conference and meeting area, gymnasium, library, and mezzanine area. The expansion was to use a color scheme highlighting the school color, royal blue, and inexpensive materials. The materials included sealed concrete floors, cementitious board walls, and a galvanized metal roof. The architect was Archimania from Memphis. The expansion was approved by the Tennessee Department of Education, the Tennessee Department of Finance and Administration, and the Tennessee Legislature.

== See also ==
- Tennessee School for the Deaf
- Tennessee School for the Blind
