= Greenbrier, Tennessee =

- City
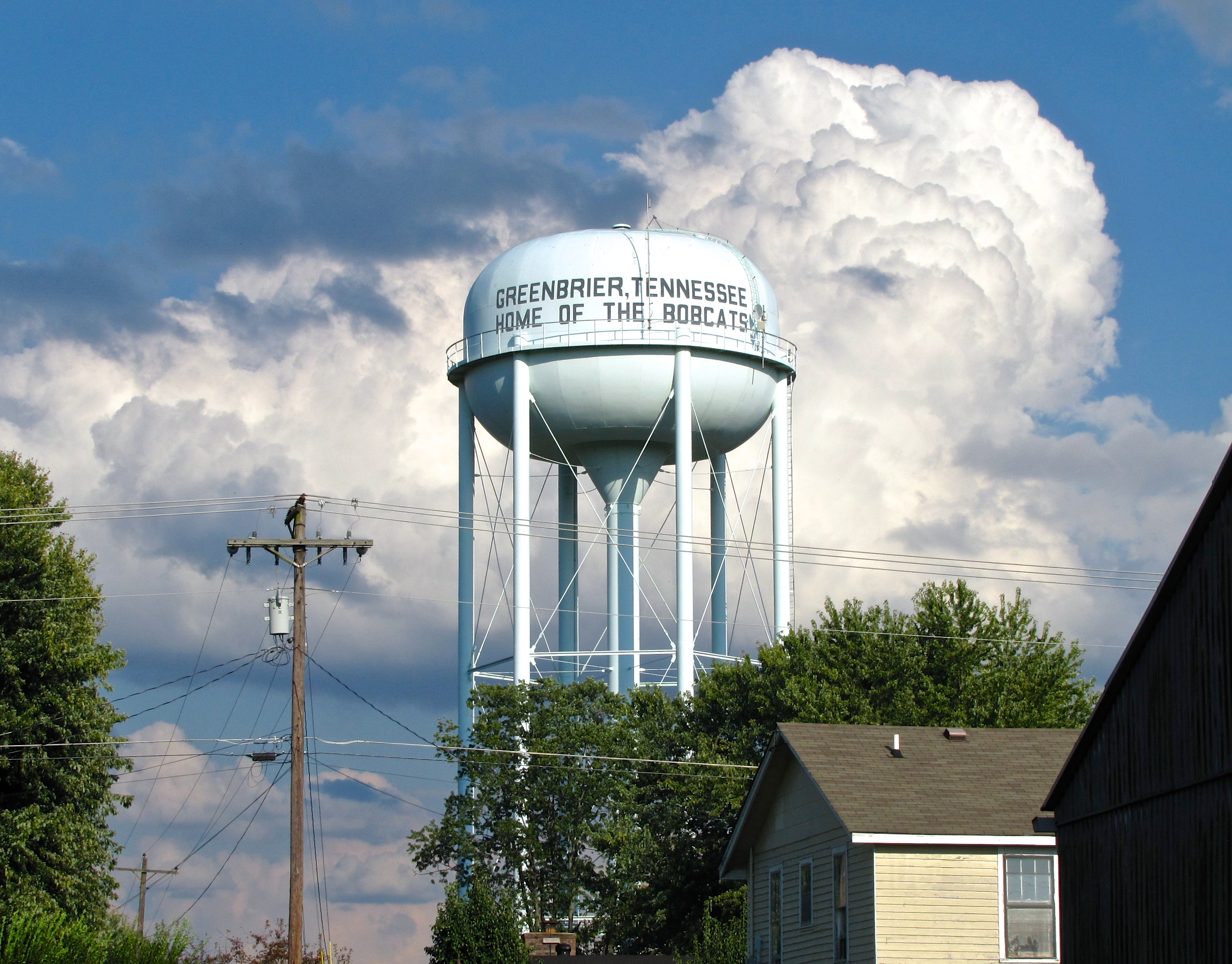
- Water tower in Greenbrier

- Seal

- Location of Greenbrier in Robertson County, Tennessee.
- Coordinates: 36°25′39″N 86°48′17″W
- Country: United States
- State: Tennessee
- County: Robertson

Government
  - Type: Mayor-Council
  - Mayor: Adcock, Lanny
  - Ward 3 Aldermans: Davis Chris, Deaver Bill
  - Ward 2 Aldermans: Delong Jeff, Allgood Alisha
  - Ward 1 Aldermans: Dorris Billy Ray, Tohey Donald

Area
  - Total: 7.30 sq mi (18.90 km^{2})
  - Land: 7.26 sq mi (18.80 km^{2})
  - Water: 0.039 sq mi (0.10 km^{2})
- Elevation: 850 ft (260 m)

Population (2020)
  - Total: 6,898
  - Estimate (2024): 7,039
  - Density: 950.1/sq mi (366.82/km^{2})
- Time zone: UTC-6 (Central (CST))
  - Summer (DST): UTC-5 (CDT)
- ZIP code: 37073
- Area code: 615
- FIPS code: 47-30960
- GNIS feature ID: 1286141
- Website: greenbriertn.org

Greenbrier is a city in Robertson County, Tennessee, United States. The population was 6,898 at the 2020 United States census.

== Geography ==
According to the United States Census Bureau, the city has a total area of 6.6 square miles (17.2 km^{2}), of which 6.6 square miles is land and 0.04 square mile (0.45%) is water. The city is concentrated along a stretch of U.S. Route 41, southeast of Springfield and northwest of Goodlettsville. Greenbrier lies about 23 miles (37 km) north of Nashville.

== Demographics ==
Historical population
Census	Pop.	Note	%±
1910	522		—
1920	518		−0.8%
1930	631		21.8%
1940	795		26.0%
1950	890		11.9%
1960	1,238		39.1%
1970	2,279		84.1%
1980	3,180		39.5%
1990	2,873		−9.7%
2000	4,940		71.9%
2010	6,433		30.2%
2020	6,898		7.2%
2025 (est.)	7,170	▲	3.9%

=== 2020 census ===
Greenbrier racial composition
Race	Number	Percentage
White (non-Hispanic)	5,996	86.92%
Black or African American (non-Hispanic)	196	2.84%
Native American	15	0.22%
Asian	92	1.33%
Pacific Islander	1	0.01%
Other/Mixed	298	4.32%
Hispanic or Latino	300	4.35%

As of the 2020 United States census, there were 6,898 people, 2,393 households, and 1,807 families residing in the town.

=== 2000 census ===
As of the census of 2000, there were 4,490 people, 1,837 households, and 1,418 families residing in the city. The population density was 748.3 inhabitants per square mile (288.9/km^{2}). There were 1,920 housing units at an average density of 290.9 per square mile (112.3/km^{2}). The racial makeup of the city was 97.43% White, 0.67% African American, 0.22% Native American, 0.38% Asian, 0.49% from other races, and 0.81% from two or more races. Hispanic or Latino of any race were 1.28% of the population.

Of the 1,837 households, 41.5% had children under the age of 18 living with them, 60.7% were married couples living together, 13.0% had a female householder with no husband present, and 22.8% were non-families. 18.9% of all households were made up of individuals, and 6.8% had someone living alone who was 65 years of age or older. The average household size was 2.69 and the average family size was 3.06.

In the city, the population was spread out, with 28.6% under the age of 18, 9.6% from 18 to 24, 33.8% from 25 to 44, 18.7% from 45 to 64, and 9.3% who were 65 years of age or older. The median age was 32 years. For every 100 females, there were 94.7 males. For every 100 females age 18 and over, there were 89.0 males.

The median income for a household in the city was $32,568, and the median income for a family was $48,262. Males had a median income of $34,353 versus $23,523 for females. The per capita income for the city was $17,902. About 2.8% of families and 5.3% of the population were below the poverty line, including 5.4% of those under age 18 and 5.3% of those age 65 or over.

== Annual events ==
Greenbrier is known for its annual Turning of the Pig celebration on July 3. It is a large barbecue festival benefiting the high school band program. This community-wide event provides food, carnival games, live entertainment, local artisans, and family fun. Hundreds of pounds of pork are cooked on open pits during the festival, and the pulled pork is available for sale beginning on the morning of July 4.

== Parks ==
Louise Martin Memorial Park has an approximately 6/10th of a mile walking/running loop that is paved and another approximately half mile of walking/running trails. Additionally, the park has three baseball fields and a small play area for children. There are several picnic areas and a large open field available for various activities.

== Education ==
- Public Schools:

Greenbrier High School

Greenbrier Middle School

Greenbrier Elementary School

- Private School:

Dayspring Academy
