= Southwind High School =

Public high school in Tennessee, United States

Coordinates: 35.02361°N 89.80064°W

- 7900 East Shelby Drive; Memphis, TN, (Shelby County), Tennessee 38125; United States

Information
- Established: 2007
- School district: Memphis-Shelby County Schools
- Principal: Jakyrin Jackson
- Enrollment: 1,622 (2023-2024)
- Colors: Purple; Black
- Mascot: Jaguars
- Website: https://southwind-hs.scsk12.org/

Southwind High School (SHS) is a public high school located in the Southwind, Memphis gated community in unincorporated Shelby County, Tennessee, United States. It is operated by the Memphis-Shelby County Schools district. It was established in 2007.

The school was 2012–2013 TSSAA Basketball State Champion.

== School incident ==
On August 9, 2022, a student was in an altercation with a security guard, due to the violation of a school dress code. Because of this, three security guards slammed the student down to the ground. However, the student was wearing sandals, and it was also caught on video by another student.

== Notable alumni ==
- Jarnell Stokes, former basketball player for the University of Tennessee and the NBA's Memphis Grizzlies who now plays for the Xinjiang Flying Tigers of the Chinese Basketball Association.
- Kristian Williams, NFL defensive tackle for the Denver Broncos
