= Columbia Academy (Tennessee) =

Private school in Columbia, Tennessee, US

Location
- 1101 West 7th St; Columbia, Tennessee 38401; 35°37′00″N 87°03′24″W

Information
- Former name: Columbia Military Academy (1905-1979)
- Type: Independent coeducational college-preparatory
- Motto: "Christian Education in a Tradition of Excellence since 1979"
- Religious affiliations: Christian; church of Christ
- Established: 1979
- Accreditation: AdvancED
- President: James A. Thomas
- Grades: PreK-12
- Enrollment: 955
- Student to teacher ratio: 17:1
- Campuses: (2): Columbia, TN; Spring Hill, TN (Satellite Campus)
- Colors: Red, White, Navy, Baby Blue
- Athletics conference: TSSAA - Division I-AA
- Mascot: Bulldogs
- Website: www.cabulldogs.org
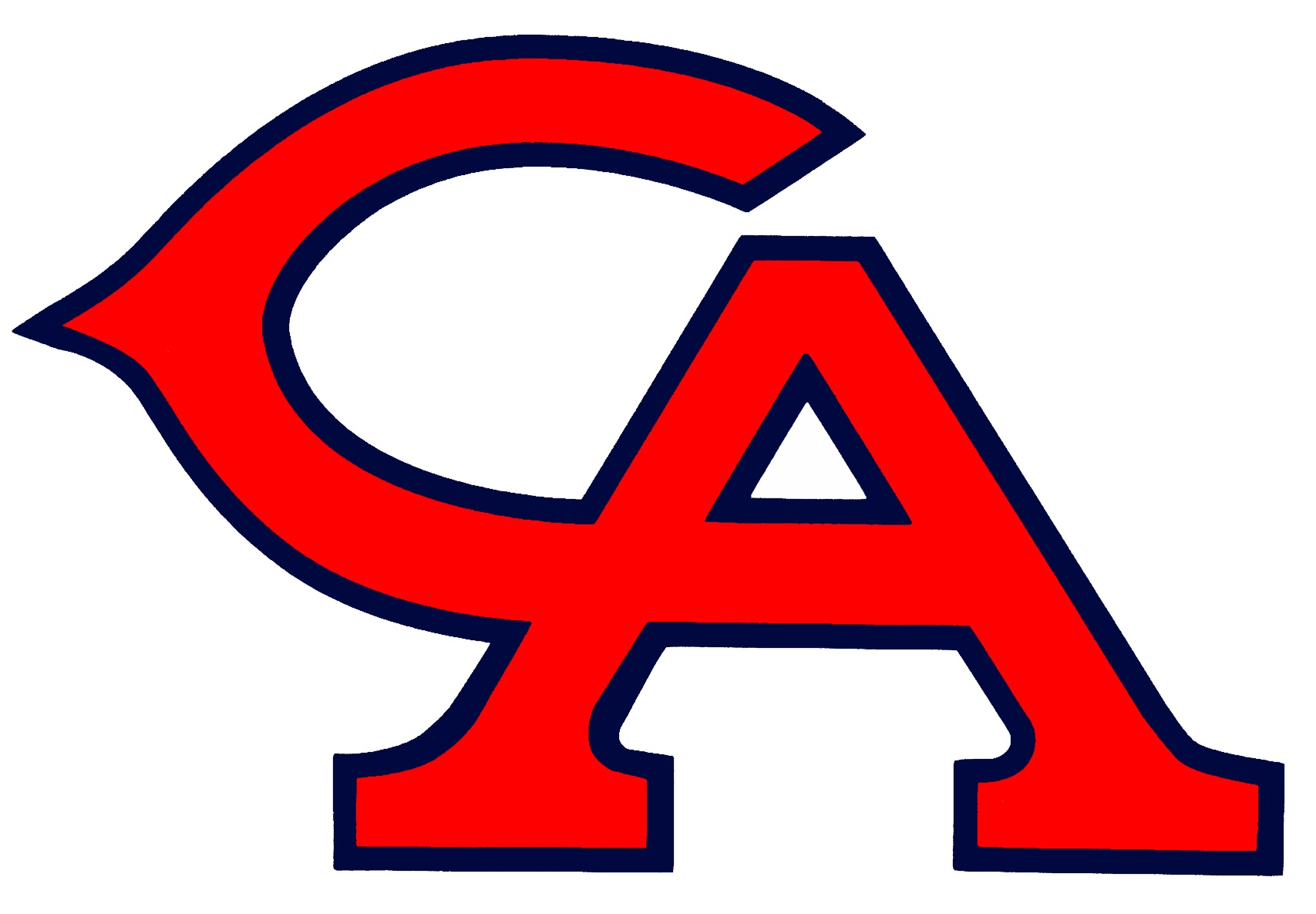

Columbia Academy (CA) is a private, college preparatory, co-educational, Christian school for students in grades Pre-K-12 located in Columbia, Tennessee. Founded in 1905 as Columbia Military Academy (CMA) on the campus of a closed U.S. Army arsenal, the school lasted until 1979 when it was turned over to a local Christian group that reorganized the school as a private Christian day school, removing all military aspects.

== History ==
=== Columbia Military Academy ===
The CA campus was proposed in the 1880s and approved by President Grover Cleveland in 1888. In 1891 it opened as an arsenal for the U.S. Army. The arsenal closed following the Spanish–American War and was declared surplus property in 1901. In 1904 the property opened as Columbia Military Academy. CMA went through periods of highs and lows, even briefly closing in the mid 1930s. In its final years the school began to struggle with enrollment. With the recent civil rights movements leading to the desegregation of public schools, many private day schools began popping up across the country, that mixed with the controversies around the Vietnam War led to lower rates of students going to military school. In its last year of CMA the school began to allow civilian females as day students. The school officially closed in early 1979 and was turned over to a local Christian group. The school reopened that same year as a co-ed private Christian day school, removing "military" from the school's name.

== Campus ==
The CA campus covers 67 acres (27 ha) between Trotwood Avenue and West 7th Street in downtown Columbia. The campus is listed on the National Register of Historic Places.

Campus buildings include:

- Polk Hall (High School)
- Science Hall (Middle School)
- Vest Hall (Lower School)
- Lovell Hall (Old Gymnasium)
- Anderson Fieldhouse (Gym and Football Stadium)
- JJ Savage Field (Football Field)
- Ragsdale Hall (Financial Office)
- Academy Hall (Administration Office)
- CMA Guard House (CMA Museum)

=== Spring Hill Campus ===
In 2010 CA opened its first and only satellite campus on Beechcroft Road in Spring Hill, Tennessee. The campus houses grades preK-5th.

== Athletics ==
The 2018 Columbia Academy baseball team won the D1-A state championship. The baseball team also won state the D1-A championship in 1994. The school has Football, Baseball, Softball, Men's & Woman's Basketball, Bowling, Track & Field, Cross Country, Volleyball, Golf, Trap Shooting, Tennis, Swimming, Cheerleading, and youth sports programs.

=== Anderson Fieldhouse ===
In 2011 Columbia Academy launched "Vision 2020", a $10 Million Capital Campaign for school improvements. The centerpiece of the campaign was a $6 Million athletic facility to house both Basketball & Football locker rooms, a state of the art Basketball gym and weight room, and also serve as the home stands for football games. The lead donors for the project were Tom and Jade Anderson who raised $9.2 Million for the campaign.

The football stands opened for the fall 2012 football season while the rest of the facility, including locker rooms, were unfinished. On January 25, 2013, the Fieldhouse officially opened.

== Notable alumni ==
- Lynnette Cole, Miss Tennessee USA 2000 and Miss USA 2000
