= Kingsbury High School (Tennessee) =

Coordinates: 35.1662°N 89.9252°W

Location
- 1270 North Graham Street; Memphis, (Shelby County), Tennessee 38122; United States

Information
- Type: Public high school
- Principal: Shenar Miller
- Teaching staff: 78.06 (FTE)
- Enrollment: 1,327 (2023-2024)
- Student to teacher ratio: 17.00
- Colors: Maroon; White
- Nickname: Falcons
- Website: https://kingsbury-hs.scsk12.org/

Kingsbury High School, also known as Kingsbury Middle/High School, is a public high school in Memphis, Tennessee and a part of Shelby County Schools. It was previously in Memphis City Schools.

In 2018 the SCS administration suspended principal Terry Ross, accusing him of misconduct. Ross was previously principal of Bennett High School in Buffalo, New York.
