= Hamilton County Schools =

School district in Tennessee, United States

Location
- Hamilton County, Tennessee United States

District information
- Grades: PK–12
- Superintendent: Justin Robertson
- Schools: 79
- NCES District ID: 4701590

Students and staff
- Students: 44,909
- Teachers: 2,914
- Staff: 6,000
- Student–teacher ratio: 14:1
- Athletic conference: TSSAA

Other information
- Website: hcde.org

Hamilton County Schools (or Hamilton County Department of Education) is the school district that serves Hamilton County, Tennessee, USA. After a 1995 referendum, the then-separate Chattanooga City Schools district was merged into the county district in 1997. About 2,300 high school seniors graduated from the system in May 2011.

== History ==
=== Chattanooga City Schools ===
In 1994, Chattanooga residents voted to consolidate with Hamilton County Schools. The merger was opposed by the city school board and the NAACP unsuccessfully filed a lawsuit to block it. The county school board decided to seek help developing the new school system from the Public Education Foundation.

== District leadership and schools ==
The Department of Education serves about 45,000 students in Hamilton County with 2,914 teachers at 79 schools. The schools are divided into five learning communities. Hamilton County's superintendent is Dr. Justin Robertson and the district's deputy superintendent is Dr. Sonia Stewart.

=== Board of Education Members ===
School board members of Hamilton County Schools include: Steve Slater, District 1; Ben Daugherty, District 2; Joe Smith, District 3; Jackie Thomas, District 4; Karitsa Jones, District 5; Ben Connor, District 6; Jodi Schaffer, District 7; Larry Grohn, District 8; Gary Kuehn, District 9; Felice Hadden, District 10; Jill Black, District 11.

=== High schools ===
The Secondary Education Division provides 14 high schools to serve students in grades 9–12.

- Brainerd (District 5)
- Central (District 9)
- Sequoyah (District 1)
- East Hamilton (District 9)
- East Ridge (District 8)
- Hamilton County Collegiate
- Hixson (District 3)
- Lookout Valley
- Ooltewah (District 9)
- Red Bank (District 2)
- Sale Creek
- Signal Mountain
- Soddy Daisy (District 1)
- The Howard School

=== Middle schools ===
Students in grades 6–8 are served by 21 middle schools.

- Brown Middle
- Chattanooga Charter School of Excellence Middle
- Chattanooga Girls Leadership Academy
- Chattanooga High Center for Creative Arts
- Chattanooga Preparatory School
- Chattanooga School for the Arts & Sciences -K-12
- Chattanooga School for the Liberal Arts
- Dalewood Middle
- East Hamilton Middle
- East Lake Academy
- East Ridge Middle
- HC Virtual School
- Hixson Middle
- Howard Connect Academy
- Hunter Middle
- Ivy Academy
- Loftis Middle
- Lookout Valley Middle / High
- Normal Park Museum Magnet
- Ooltewah Middle
- Orchard Knob Middle
- Red Bank Middle
- Sale Creek Middle / High
- Signal Mountain Middle / High
- Soddy Daisy Middle
- Tyner Middle Academy

=== Elementary schools ===
There are 44 elementary schools serving students in grades K–5.

- Allen Elementary
- Alpine Crest Elementary
- Apison Elementary
- Barger Academy
- Battle Academy
- Bess T. Sheperd Elementary
- Big Ridge Elementary
- Birchwood Elementary
- Brown Academy
- Calvin Donaldson
- Clifton Hills Elementary
- Daisy Elementary
- Du Pont Elementary
- East Brainerd Elementary
- East Lake Elementary
- East Ridge Elementary
- East Side Elementary
- Falling Water Elementary
- Middle Valley Elementary
- Hardy Elementary
- Harrison Elementary
- Hillcrest Elementary
- Hixson Elementary
- Lakeside Academy of Math, Science and Technology
- Lookout Mountain Elementary
- Lookout Valley Elementary
- McConnell Elementary
- Nolan Elementary
- Normal Park Upper
- Normal Park Lower
- North Hamilton
- Ooltewah Elementary
- Orchard Knob Elementary
- Red Bank Elementary
- Rivermont Elementary
- Snow Hill Elementary
- Soddy Elementary
- Spring Creek Elementary
- Thrasher Elementary
- Tommie F. Brown International Academy
- Wallace A. Smith Elementary
- Westview Elementary
- Wolftever Creek Elementary
- Woodmore Elementary

=== Combination schools ===
The district has 7 schools that covers grades ranging from K–12 to 6–12.

- Chattanooga School for the Arts and Sciences (K-12) CSAS
- Chattanooga School for the Liberal Arts (K-12) CSLA
- Center for Creative Arts (6–12) CCA
- East Hamilton Middle/High School (6–12) East Hamilton Archived October 30, 2010, at the Wayback Machine (District 7)
- Lookout Valley Middle/High School (6–12) Lookout Valley (District 6)
- Sale Creek Middle/High School (6–12) Sale Creek (District 1)
- Signal Mountain Middle/High School (6–12) Signal Mountain (District 2)

=== Alternative schools ===
The system provides four schools to serve students in special education, students at risk, high achievement students, and students with behavioral problems.

- Dawn School
- Hamilton County High School
- Middle College High School
- Washington Alternative School
