= Central High School (Knoxville, Tennessee) =

Coordinates: 36°02′27″N 83°55′33″W

Location
- 5321 Jacksboro PK; Knoxville, Tennessee 37918; United States

Information
- Type: Public secondary
- Established: 1906; 120 years ago
- Principal: Danielle Rutig
- Faculty: 150
- Teaching staff: 86.23 (FTE)
- Grades: 9–12
- Enrollment: 1,296 (2023–2024)
- Student to teacher ratio: 15.03
- Colors: Red and black
- Mascot: Bobcat
- Website: centralhs.knoxschools.org

Central High School is a public high school located at 5321 Jacksboro Pike in the Fountain City neighborhood of Knoxville, Tennessee, operated by the Knox County school system. The school's athletic teams are nicknamed the Bobcats, and its colors are red and black.

== History ==
Central was formerly located at what is now Gresham Middle School in the heart of Fountain City. In the 1960s, it was the largest unincorporated community in Tennessee. Its name is something of a misnomer, since it has never been located near the center of Knoxville, even when Fountain City was annexed into Knoxville in the early 1960s. The northernmost high school in Knoxville before the annexation of Fountain City was Fulton, and in the county, Powell, Karns, and Halls high schools were farther north.

== 2008 shooting ==
On August 21, 2008, 15-year-old student Jamar Siler entered the school cafeteria and approached student Ryan McDonald sitting at a lunch table. Siler fatally shot McDonald, and was arrested by authorities a short time later. The two had been in previous altercations, the details of which were not released to the general public.

Siler was initially tried as a juvenile until Juvenile Court judge, Tim Irwin, ordered that he be tried as an adult. In November 2011, at age 18, Siler pleaded guilty to second-degree murder and received a 30-year sentence. Siler is currently incarcerated in the Trousdale Turner Correctional Center.

== Notable attendees ==
- Roy Acuff, country music star
- Kelsea Ballerini, country music singer-songwriter
- Trevor Bayne, NASCAR driver who won the 2011 Daytona 500
- Reggie Cobb, former Tampa Bay Buccaneers running back
- Tony Cosey, Olympic steeplechase runner
- Michele Carringer, state legislator.
- Ray Graves, football player at Tennessee and head football coach at Florida
- Todd Helton, professional baseball player
- Scott Holtzman, UFC Lightweight Fighter
- Frankie Housley, heroic flight attendant
- Con Hunley, American country music singer
- Tim Irwin, former Minnesota Vikings lineman, former University of Tennessee lineman, Judge of Juvenile Court, Knox County, Tennessee
- Josh Lovelace, singer, songwriter and musician best known as the keyboardist for the rock band Needtobreathe.
- Terrence Scott, British Columbia Lions Football Player
- Steve Searcy, baseball player
- William T. Snyder, Chancellor of University of Tennessee-Knoxville (1992–1999) and house organist at the Tennessee Theater
- Bob Suffridge, lineman for Philadelphia Eagles and University of Tennessee.
- Jennifer Tipton, Tony Award-winning lighting designer
- Bubba Trammell, baseball player
- Richard Aaker Trythall, pianist and composer
- Chris Zachary, Major League Baseball pitcher
- Glenn McNeil, Was the President of the Tennessee Press Association from 1947 until 1979 and was the major advocate for passing three of the most influential bills in the Tennessee state legislature's history regarding freedom of speech and government transparency: The Open Records Act of 1957, The Freedom of Information Act of 1973, and the Open Meetings or "Sunshine Law" of 1974.
- Hunter Webb is a film and television production professional with experience working with industry professionals. His extensive career spans from Hulu comedy special “By A Thread” to the Food Network’s “Halloween Baking Championship”. Webb was a part of Bobcat Company and Central’s theatre program. Crediting his multidisciplinary design and arts background to his time at CHS.
