= Devin Harper =

American football player (born 1998)

Profile
- Position: Linebacker

Personal information
- Born: May 13, 1998 (age 28); Austell, Georgia, U.S.
- Listed height: 6 ft 0 in (1.83 m)
- Listed weight: 238 lb (108 kg)

Career information
- High school: Karns (Karns, Tennessee)
- College: Oklahoma State (2016–2021)
- NFL draft: 2022: 6th round, 193rd overall pick

Career history
- Dallas Cowboys (2022–2023); Cincinnati Bengals (2023); Pittsburgh Steelers (2024)*
- * Offseason or practice squad member only

Career NFL statistics as of 2024
- Total tackles: 5
- Stats at Pro Football Reference

Devin Harper (born May 13, 1998) is an American professional football linebacker. He played college football for the Oklahoma State Cowboys.

== Early life ==
Harper attended Karns High School. He was a two-way player at running back and linebacker. As a junior in 2015, he was a part of a winless team.

As a senior in 2016, he contributed to a 3-7 record, while collecting 1,403 rushing yards, 18 touchdowns, 40 tackles (5.5 for loss), 2 sacks, 2 forced fumbles, one fumble recovery and averaging 213 all-purpose yards per game. He rushed for 345 yards in a single-game against South-Doyle High School. He received All-District and All-Knoxville Interscholastic League honors.

He also practiced basketball and track. As a senior, he led the basketball team to the sectional round of the District 3-A Playoffs, while receiving District 3-AAA Player of the Year and All-Region honors.

== College career ==
Harper accepted a football scholarship from Oklahoma State University, with the intention of playing linebacker. As a redshirt freshman in 2017, he played mostly playing on special teams, tallying 5 tackles and one blocked punt.

As a sophomore in 2018, he appeared in all 13 games with one start, recording 44 total tackles (5 for loss), 2.5 sacks, one pass defensed, one forced fumble and an interception returned for a touchdown. He had 9 tackles against the University of Kansas.

Harper played through a painful junior year in 2019, wearing a cast during a part of the season. He appeared in 10 games with one start. He amassed 34 total tackles (5 for loss) and 3 sacks. He had 6 tackles against the University of Kansas.

As a senior in 2020, he appeared in all 11 played with one start. Two games were canceled because of the COVID-19 pandemic. He posted 37 tackles (sixth on the team), 5.5 tackles for loss, 2 sacks, one interception and one pass defensed. Harper was also an All-Big 12 academic honoree. He had 5 tackles against West Virginia University.

As a super senior in 2021, he enjoyed his best season, becoming a full-time starter along with being voted a team captain. He started 13 out of 14 games, finishing the season with 96 tackles (second on the team), 10 tackles for loss, 6 sacks (third on the team), 15 quarterback hurries (second in school history), 2 passes defensed, one forced fumble and 2 fumble recoveries. In the 2021 Bedlam matchup against Oklahoma, he was a key part in defending their offense, tying a career-high 10 tackles (7 solo), and with less than 2 minutes left in the game, he forced a throwaway pass, a 5-yard loss sack, tackled quarterback Caleb Williams short of the first down marker on three consecutive plays, while helping the Cowboys close a 37–33 win. He had 10 tackles in the 2022 Fiesta Bowl, contributing to one off the biggest rallies in school history for a 37–35 win against the University of Notre Dame.

== Professional career ==
Pre-draft measurables
Height	Weight	Arm length	Hand span	40-yard dash	10-yard split	20-yard split	20-yard shuttle	Three-cone drill	Vertical jump	Broad jump	Bench press
6 ft 0 1/4 in (1.84 m)	234 lb (106 kg)	31 7/8 in (0.81 m)	8 7/8 in (0.23 m)	4.50 s	1.57 s	2.56 s	4.03 s	6.84 s	40.5 in (1.03 m)	9 ft 11 in (3.02 m)	21 reps
All values from Pro Day

=== Dallas Cowboys ===
Harper was selected by the Dallas Cowboys in the sixth round (193rd overall) of the 2022 NFL draft. He was declared inactive in 4 games, before being placed on the reserve/injured list with Achilles tendinitis on October 29, 2022. He appeared in the first 3 games of the season playing on special teams and did not record any stats.

In 2023, after rookie DeMarvion Overshown's season-ending injury, Markquese Bell passed him on the depth chart for the strongside linebacker job. Harper appeared in the first 3 games of the season, playing mostly on special teams, registering 2 defensive tackles and one special teams tackle. He was waived by the team on September 28, to make room for center Brock Hoffman, in order to provide depth on the offensive line.

=== Cincinnati Bengals ===
On September 29, 2023, Harper was claimed off waivers by the Cincinnati Bengals. He was declared inactive in 8 games. He appeared in 6 games, making 2 special teams tackles. He was waived by the Bengals on August 27, 2024.

=== Pittsburgh Steelers ===
On August 29, 2024, Harper was signed to the Pittsburgh Steelers practice squad. He signed a reserve/future contract with Pittsburgh on January 14, 2025. Harper was waived with an injury designation on August 18, and reverted to injured reserve the following day. He was released on August 20.

== Personal life ==
Harper was born to his parents Kevin and Alacia. He is the older brother of Detroit Lions safety Thomas Harper.

Harper has a son named Ryder, whom he welcomed on August 9, 2019.
