= Thomas Harper (American football) =

American football player (born 2000)

No. 12 – Detroit Lions
- Position: Safety
- Roster status: Injured reserve

Personal information
- Born: November 5, 2000 (age 26); Knoxville, Tennessee, U.S.
- Listed height: 5 ft 10 in (1.78 m)
- Listed weight: 189 lb (86 kg)

Career information
- High school: Karns (Karns, Tennessee)
- College: Oklahoma State (2019–2022); Notre Dame (2023)
- NFL draft: 2024: undrafted

Career history
- Los Angeles Chargers (2024)*; Las Vegas Raiders (2024); Detroit Lions (2025–present)
- * Offseason or practice squad member only

Career NFL statistics as of 2026
- Total tackles: 68
- Sacks: 0.5
- Forced fumbles: 1
- Fumble recoveries: 1
- Interceptions: 2
- Pass deflections: 9
- Stats at Pro Football Reference

Thomas Westley Harper (born November 5, 2000) is an American professional football safety for the Detroit Lions of the National Football League (NFL). He played college football for the Oklahoma State Cowboys and Notre Dame Fighting Irish. He signed with the Los Angeles Chargers as an undrafted free agent following the 2024 NFL draft.

== Early life ==
Harper was born on November 5, 2000, in Knoxville, Tennessee. He grew up playing basketball before trying out for the Karns High School football team as a sophomore. With the Karns football team, he became a top wide receiver and defensive back. He was an all-district, all-region and team MVP selection while being the first player in school history with over 1,000 receiving yards.

Harper totaled 1,086 receiving yards and 11 touchdowns as a junior, being named all-state, and then had 1,279 receiving yards and 18 touchdowns as a senior, also ending his high school career with 155 tackles, 16 passes defended and three interceptions. A two-star recruit, he committed to play college football for the Oklahoma State Cowboys, the only Power Five program to give him an offer, which allowed him to join his brother Devin, a linebacker.

== College career ==
Harper appeared in 12 games as a true freshman in 2019, mainly on special teams, recording 13 tackles. The following year, he appeared in all 11 games, one as a starter, and recorded 31 tackles while earning second-team Academic All-Big 12 Conference honors. In 2021, he played 12 games and totaled 20 tackles with 1.5 tackles-for-loss (TFLs). He won a starting role in 2022. That year, he made 30 tackles and 1.5 TFLs while appearing in seven games.

In 2023, Harper transferred to the Notre Dame Fighting Irish for his final season of eligibility. With Notre Dame, he appeared in 11 games and posted 39 tackles, six TFLs, three passes defended and two sacks. He opted out of the team's 2023 Sun Bowl victory over Oregon State due to injury.

== Professional career ==
Pre-draft measurables
Height	Weight	Arm length	Hand span	Wingspan	40-yard dash	10-yard split	20-yard split	20-yard shuttle	Three-cone drill	Vertical jump	Broad jump	Bench press
5 ft 10 1/8 in (1.78 m)	189 lb (86 kg)	29 3/8 in (0.75 m)	8 7/8 in (0.23 m)	5 ft 11 1/4 in (1.81 m)	4.50 s	1.50 s	2.50 s	4.39 s	7.11 s	42 in (1.07 m)	10 ft 6 in (3.20 m)	18 reps
All values from Pro Day

=== Los Angeles Chargers ===
After going unselected in the 2024 NFL draft, Harper signed with the Los Angeles Chargers as an undrafted free agent. He was waived on August 27, as part of the team's roster cuts.

=== Las Vegas Raiders ===
On August 28, 2024, Harper was claimed off waivers by the Las Vegas Raiders. He was waived on August 28, 2025.

=== Detroit Lions ===
On August 29, 2025, Harper was claimed off waivers by the Detroit Lions.

On September 26, 2026 Harper was placed on injured reserve.

== Career statistics ==
Legend
**Bold**	Career high

=== NFL ===
Year	Team	Games		Tackles						Interceptions						Fumbles		
Year	Team	GP	GS	Total	Solo	Ast	Sck	TFL	Sfty	PD	Int	Yds	Avg	Lng	TD	FF	FR	TD
2024	LV	15	5	26	13	**13**	**0.5**	0	0	2	**1**	**14**	**14.0**	**14**	0	0	**1**	0
2025	DET	12	9	**37**	**26**	11	0.0	**1**	0	**5**	**1**	0	0.0	0	0	**1**	0	0
Career		27	14	63	39	24	0.5	1	0	7	2	14	7.0	14	0	1	1	0

=== College ===
Year	Team	Games		Tackles				Interceptions				Fumbles		
Year	Team	GP	GS	Total	Solo	Ast	Sack	PD	Int	Yds	TD	FF	FR	TD
2019	Oklahoma State	12	0	13	9	4	0.0	0	0	0	0	0	0	0
2020	Oklahoma State	11	1	30	**26**	4	0.0	**3**	**1**	0	0	0	**1**	0
2021	Oklahoma State	12	0	20	12	8	0.0	1	0	0	0	**1**	0	0
2022	Oklahoma State	7	7	30	17	13	0.0	2	**1**	**11**	0	0	0	0
2023	Notre Dame	11	10	**39**	25	**14**	**2.0**	**3**	0	0	0	**1**	0	0
Career		53	18	132	89	43	2.0	9	2	11	0	2	1	0

== Personal life ==
Harper was born to his parents Kevin and Alacia. He is the younger brother of linebacker Devin Harper.
