= Muskogee High School =

Public high school in Muskogee, Oklahoma

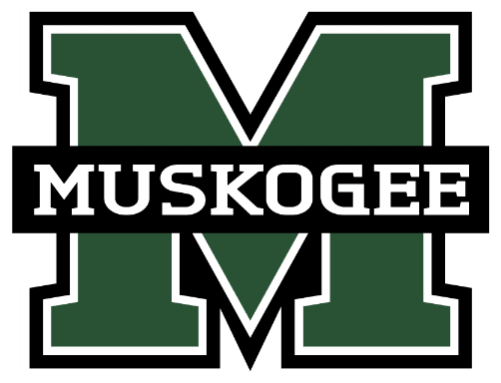

Location
- 3200 East Shawnee; Muskogee, Oklahoma 74403; United States; 35.770015°N 95.328673°W

Information
- Type: Co-Educational, Public, Secondary
- Established: August 19, 1970
- School board: Muskogee Board of Education
- Authority: OSDE
- Principal: Kinsey Cook
- Staff: 61.29 (FTE)
- Enrollment: 1,026 (2023–2024)
- Student to teacher ratio: 16.74
- Colors: Green and white
- Mascot: Roughers
- Website: www.muskogeeps.org/o/mhs/page/muskogee-high-school

Muskogee High School (MHS) is a three-year public high school in Muskogee, Oklahoma, U.S. It is accredited by the Oklahoma State Department of Education and the Oklahoma Secondary School Activities Association.

Muskogee High School is part of the Muskogee Independent School District No. 20 of Muskogee County, Oklahoma, more commonly known as Muskogee Public Schools.

== School history ==
The Muskogee Rougher is the mascot of Muskogee High School and Muskogee Public Schools at-large.

In August 2018, the school administration announced that any student who, within a four-week period, is late to classes four times would receive a fine of $250. At the same time, the administration stated that safety concerns caused it to ban students from wandering around the campus during lunch times, increase class times, and reduce the times of lunch periods. According to a KOCO-TV article, students planned to protest the new rules.

== Academics ==
Muskogee High School offers a wide range of academic courses.

=== Advanced Placement Program ===
The Advanced Placement (AP) Program provides college-level courses to MHS student through AP courses. Through AP Exams, students have the opportunity to earn credit or advanced standing at most of the nation's colleges and universities.

=== Concurrent enrollment ===
Juniors and seniors of exceptional ability are provided with the opportunity to gain college credit while completing their high school education. School counselors must verify that prerequisites are met and that enrollment in the college course has been completed, including payment for the course(s), prior to concurrent enrollment being changed on a student's schedule.

=== Special Education Department ===
Muskogee High School provides comprehensive services to qualifying students.

=== Technology and Business Department ===
Through different programs at MHS students are allowed to incorporate work experience into their academic plans. The DECA program allows students to attends MHS half the day and maintain a job the other half. Students interested in technical and career-specific skills to prepare for such careers as automotive, child care, computers, construction, cosmetology, industrial technology, health care, and landscape may enroll in programs at the Muskogee Indian Capital Technology Center, affiliated with the Oklahoma Department of Career and Technology Education.

== Athletics ==
=== Basketball ===
State championship (Muskogee High): 1975

=== Football ===
State Championships (Central High): 1910, 1914, 1919, 1920, 1923, 1925, 1935, 1940, 1947, 1948, 1949, 1950, 1951

State Championship (Muskogee High): 1986 – 2023

The current head coach is Dale Condict.

=== Softball ===
State Championship (Muskogee High): 1983, 1998, 2000, 2009

The Rougher Softball Team was also named the Class 6A Academic State Champions in 2013, with a team GPA of 3.7.

== Student clubs and organizations ==
- Air Force JROTC
- African-American Heritage Club
- Art Club
- Asian Club
- Business Professionals of America
- Muskogee Schools of Character Initiative
- Chess Club
- Choir
- DECA
- Ecology Club
- Family, Career, and Community Leaders of America (FCCLA)
- Future Farmers of America (FFA)
- Film Society
- French Club
- Future Educators of America
- Gender-Sexuality Alliance (GSA)
- History Buffs
- Junior Classical League
- Math Club
- 21st Century After School Program
- National Honor Society
- National Forensic League
- Native American Student Association
- Oklahoma Honor Society
- Pride of Muskogee (MHS marching band)
- Roughers Against Illegal Drugs (RAID)
- Revolution Color Guard / Winterguard
- Science Club
- Skills USA – VICA
- Speech Club
- Muskogee High School Student Council
- Students Against Drunk Driving
- Students Working Against Tobacco (SWAT)
- Teens for Christ
- The Chieftain (MHS yearbook)
- The Scout (MHS newspaper)
- Young Democrats
- Young Republicans
- Youth Volunteer Corps (YVC)
- All School Musical
- Academic Pursuit Team
- Fellowship of Christian Athletes (FCA)
- Nutrition Advisory Council

== Notable alumni ==
- Archie Bradley – professional baseball player (transferred to Broken Arrow Senior High School)
- Bo Bolinger – football player
- Carlton M. Caves – theoretical physicist
- Kamren Curl – football player
- Drew Edmondson – former Attorney General of Oklahoma and 2018 Democratic nominee for governor
- Ed Edmondson – former Congressman for Oklahoma's 2nd District
- James E. Edmondson – current Oklahoma Supreme Court justice
- J. Howard Edmondson – former Oklahoma Governor and Senator
- Ernest E. Evans – Commander, United States Navy. Died in combat 1944.
- George Faught – current State Representative for Muskogee
- Byrd Ficklin – Utah Utes quarterback
- John Tyler Hammons – former mayor of Muskogee
- Jack Jacobs – former Canadian Football League quarterback and one of the original inductees to the Canadian Football Hall of Fame.
- Glen D. Johnson, Jr. – current Chancellor of the Oklahoma State System of Higher Education
- Seth Littrell – former head football coach of North Texas
- Stacy McGee – football player
- Kyle McCarter – politician
- Prince McJunkins – football player
- Robert Reed – actor
- Mike Synar – former Oklahoma Congress from Oklahoma's 2nd District
- Robert Thomas – NFL defensive lineman for the New York Giants
- Roger Thompson – former Oklahoma State Senator
- Charles Thompson – football player, 1986 MVP State Championship Team, Author
