= Knox County Schools =

School district in Tennessee, United States

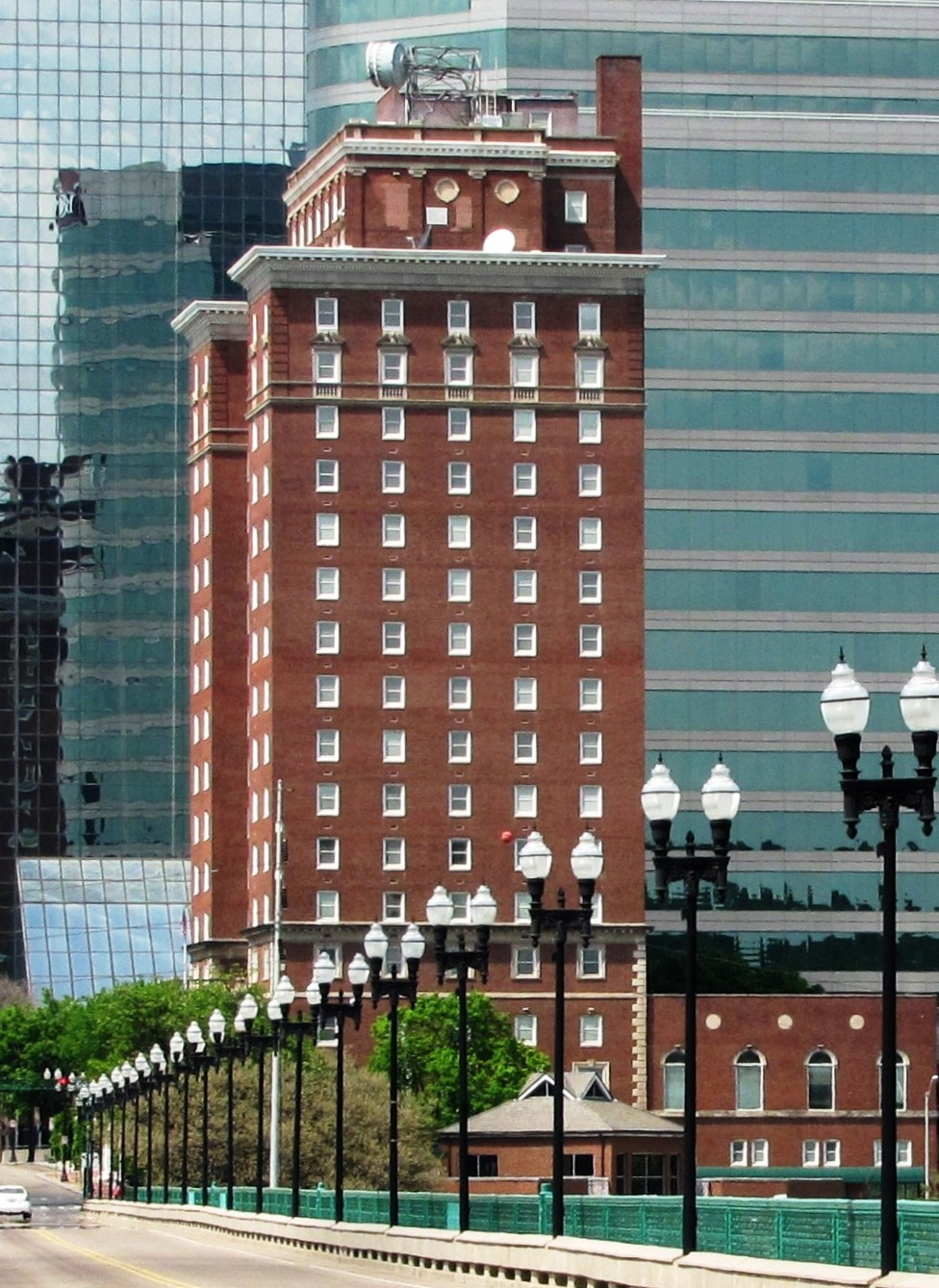
Andrew Johnson Building, former district headquarters

Knox County Schools is the school district that operates all public schools in Knox County, Tennessee.

== History ==
Before the 1987–1988 school year, the city of Knoxville and Knox County operated separate school districts. In that year the two systems were consolidated into Knox County Schools.

Beginning circa 2025 the district banned The Handmaid's Tale, The Kite Runner, and Water for Elephants. In 2026, the district banned the book Roots: The Saga of an American Family, and it was later reinstated by the superintendent.

List of Knox County School Superintendents (1869–Present)

- M.C Wilcott 1869–1873
- Thomas Conner Karns 1873–1875
- H.M Brothers 1875–1876
- H.G Hampstead 1877–1878
- Frank Smith 1879–1880
- William Gibbs 1881–1883
- John Shipe 1883–1885
- James Saylor 1886–1888
- J.C Ford 1889–1896
- D.P Duggan 1897–1900
- Sam Hill 1901–1907
- E.R Cate 1907–1910
- Monroe Wilson 1911–1917
- William Stooksbury 1917–1922
- William Morris 1923–1934
- Leonard Brickey 1934–1946
- Mildred Doyle 1946–1976
- Earl Hofmeister 1976–1992
- Allen Morgan 1992–1998
- Roy Mullins 1998–1999
- Charles Lindsey 1999–2007
- Roy Mullins 2007–2008
- Dr. James McIntyre 2008–2016
- Buzz Thomas 2016–2017 (interim)
- Bob Thomas 2017–2022
- Dr. Jon Rysewyk 2022–Present
  - Mildred Doyle holds the record for longest time as superintendent (30 years).
  - Mildred Doyle is also the only women to ever hold the office of superintendent of Knox County (county or city).

List of Knoxville City School Superintendents (1871–1988)

- Alenander Baird 1871–1875
- Reverend H.T Morton 1875–1878
- R.D.S Robertson 1877–1881
- Albert Ruth 1881–1897
- J.H. McCallie 1897–1901
- Albert Ruth 1901–1907
- Seymour Mynders 1907–1911
- Walter Miller 1910–1924
- Homer Shepherd 1926–1931
- Harry Clark 1932–1941
- Thomas Prince 1941–1949
- Wilson New 1949–1954
- Thomas Johnston 1954–1964
- Olin Adams Jr. 1964–1971
- Elmer Aslinger 1971–1973
- Roy Wallace 1973–1975
- James Newman 1975–1984
- Fred Bedelle Jr. 1984–1987

== Operations ==
Its current headquarters is in Knoxville.

It was formerly headquartered in the Andrew Johnson Building in downtown Knoxville.

== Statistics ==
The district has 94 schools (including 51 elementary schools, 16 middle schools, 16 high schools, 11 special schools) with more than 8,000 employees serving approximately 60,500 students in the cities of Knoxville and Farragut as well as all other communities in the county. There are 3,927 classroom teachers, 85 principals, and 126 assistant principals. The system has another 549 certified personnel plus 3,652 support staff. All middle and high schools are accredited by the Southern Association of Colleges and Schools and 96% of the elementary schools are accredited.

As of April 2012, there were 1,431 students enrolled in Pre-K, 27,168 K-5, 12,879 grades 6–8, 16,230 grades 9–12, and 104 in non-traditional schools. Of the student population, 76.6% are white, 5.3% Hispanic, 2.2% Asian/Pacific Island, and 13.9% African-American.

== Schools ==
The district has a total of 91 schools within 9 school board districts.

=== Elementary schools ===
Knox County operates 50 elementary schools.

- A. L. Lotts est. 1993
- Adrian Burnett est. 1976
- Amherst est. 2005
- Ball Camp est. 1931
- Bearden est. 1938
- Beaumont Magnet Elementary and Honors/Fine Arts Academy est. 2016
- Belle Morris est. 1930
- Blue Grass est. 1938
- Bonny Kate est. 1932
- Brickey-McCloud est. 2003
- Carter est. 1938
- Cedar Bluff est. 1975
- Chilhowee Intermediate est. 1928
- Christenberry est. 1996
- Copper Ridge est. 1979
- Corryton est. 1936
- Dogwood est. 1995
- East Knox County est. 1979
- Farragut Intermediate est. 1984
- Farragut Primary est. 1989
- Fountain City est. 1931
- Gap Creek est. 1933
- Gibbs est. 2006
- Green Magnet Math and Science Academy est. 1956
- Halls est. 1986
- Hardin Valley est. 2000
- Inskip est. 1948
- Karns est. 1992
- Lonsdale est. 1935
- Maynard est. 1926
- Mill Creek est. 2023
- Mooreland Heights est. 1931
- Mount Olive est. 1952
- New Hopewell est. 1952
- Northshore est. 2013
- Norwood est. 1954
- Pleasant Ridge est. 1948
- Pond Gap est. 1954
- Powell est. 1968
- Ritta est. 1905
- Rocky Hill est. 1940
- Sarah Moore Greene Magnet Technology Academy est. 1972
- Sequoyah est. 1930
- Shannondale est. 1955
- South Knoxville est. 1955
- Spring Hill est. 1955
- Sterchi est. 1959
- Sunnyview Primary est. 1963
- West Haven est. 1958
- West Hills est. 1958
- West View est. 1950

=== Middle schools ===
The district operates 16 middle schools, enrolling grades 6–8.

- Bearden Middle est. 1977
- Carter Middle est. 1948
- Cedar Bluff Middle est. 1964
- Farragut Middle est. 1984
- Gibbs Middle est. 2018
- Gresham Middle est. 1931
- Halls Middle est. 1981
- Hardin Valley Middle est. 2018
- Holston Middle est. 1957
- Karns Middle est. 1974
- Northwest Middle est. 1966
- Powell Middle est. 1974
- South-Doyle Middle est. 1967
- Vine Middle est. 1951
- West Valley Middle est. 1999
- Whittle Springs Middle est. 1959

=== High schools ===
The district operates 15 high schools. These are:

- Austin-East High School, Knoxville est. 1951
- Bearden High School, Knoxville est. 1939
- Carter High School, Strawberry Plains est. 1915
- Career Magnet Academy, located at Pellissippi State Community College
- Central High School, Knoxville est. 1906, relocated 1971
- Farragut High School, Farragut est. 1904
- Fulton High School, Knoxville est. 1951
- Gibbs High School, Corryton est. 1913
- Halls High School, Halls Crossroads est. 1916
- Hardin Valley Academy, western Knox County est. 2008
- Karns High School, Karns est. 1913
- L&N STEM Academy est. 2011, located in former L&N railroad station
- Powell High School, Powell est. 1949
- South-Doyle High School, southern Knox County est. 1967
- West High School, Knoxville est. 1951

=== Special schools ===
There are 10 Knox County schools offering special or non-traditional programs. Included are three vocational high school programs:

- Byington-Solway Career and Technical Education Center, located at Karns High School
- Lincoln Park Technology and Trade Center
- North Knox Career and Technical Education Center, located at Halls High School

The Knox County Adult High School offers day and evening high school classes for adult students (age 18 and older) desiring to complete a regular high school diploma. It is housed in the historic Knoxville High School building.

Knox County public preschools are:

- Fair Garden Preschool
- Sam E. Hill Family Community Center

Other special schools are:

- Fort Sanders Educational Development Center, offering special education services, primarily for children of preschool age
- The Knoxville Adaptive Education Center, a special school for students with mental health needs, including three elementary, three middle, and seven high school classrooms at the school, plus similar "satellite" classrooms in other county schools
- Richard Yoakley Alternative School
- Ridgedale Alternative School
- Dr. Paul L. Kelley Volunteer Academy

== Governance ==
Knox County Schools is governed by a nine-member elected board of education and directed by a superintendent they appoint. The following are serving on the Knox County Board of Education from 2024 to 2026:

- District 1: Rev. John Butler
- District 2: Ann Templeton
- District 3: Pat Ridley
- District 4: Katherine Bike
- District 5: Lauren Morgan
- District 6: Betsy Henderson
- District 7: Steve Triplett
- District 8: Travis Wright
- District 9: Kristi Kristy
- Dr. Jon Rysewyk currently serves as the Superintendent.
