= Karns High School =

Location
- 2710 Byington Solway Road; Karns, Tennessee; United States; 35.96909°N 84.1301°W

Information
- Type: Public
- Established: 1913
- Principal: Laicee Hatfield
- Teaching staff: 89.90 (FTE)
- Grades: 9–12
- Enrollment: 1,341 (2023–2024)
- Student to teacher ratio: 14.92
- Colors: blue and gold
- Mascot: Beavers
- Website: https://karnshs.knoxschools.org/

Karns High School is a public high school in the Karns community of Knox County, Tennessee administered by the Knox County Schools public school district.

A growing population in western Knox County established in 1913; prior to this time, students were assigned to Central High School, located several miles away in nearby Knoxville. As of the 2008 academic year there were 2,578 enrolled students. Still to date that is the largest number of students enrolled at Karns High School since it was established in 1913. In 1913, the first Karns High School was erected. This building was named after Professor T.C. Karns, the first Superintendent of Public Instruction in Knox County. The high school had an enrollment of 75 students while the elementary school had 160 students. In 1938, a new Karns High School was built at the cost of $74,000. Its location was in the back of the parking lot where the current Karns Intermediate School is. The location chosen had previously been a Dutch cemetery but the bodies were exhumed to Cobb's barn.

In the cornerstone of the new high school, the student body roll of 1938, newspapers, and other information of interest were buried for future generations to look at. Things went well at this location until March 10, 1978, when the building became victim of arson. Due to the quick action of the volunteer fireman, the only losses were the study hall and the temporary loss of two classrooms. Then on March 15, 1978, 5 days after the first fire, Karns became a fiery blaze in the night. At 9:06 p.m., firemen were summoned but weren't as lucky this time. This fire caused the loss of six classrooms, the study hall once again, the auditorium, cafeteria and many books and personal belongings in the lockers on the second and third floors.

== Instructional program ==
- Karns High School is 1 of 16 Knox County schools.
- Foreign languages offered at Karns are French, German, and Spanish.
- Nearby, Byington is considered to be one of the top vocational and technical supplementarys in East Tennessee. Currently 9 of the 16 Knox county schools charter buses to Byington Vocational so that other students are presented with an opportunity to participate in this program. Options are being considered to introduce a new internship program in which student can obtain full-time jobs upon graduation.
- The student to teacher ratio is 16:1.
- The graduation rate is 92% which is above the state average of 84%.
- The student body makeup is 52% female 48% male, and the total minority enrollment is 21%.
- 33% of the student body qualifies for low income aid.
- 2020 Enrollment: 1,483.

== Extracurricular activities ==
Karns High School provides a number of extracurricular activities for its students.

=== Sports ===
The mascot for Karns High School is the Beaver. Karns High school rivals are Powell High School and Hardin Valley Academy. Championship history

Sports offered include: Baseball, Basketball, Cheerleading, Cross Country, Dance, Football, Golf, Majorettes, Rugby, Soccer , Softball, Swimming, Tennis, Track, Ultimate Frisbee, Volleyball, and Wrestling.

=== Fine arts and literary clubs ===
Fine arts and literary clubs are: Concert Band, Chorus, Drama (Musical Theatre), Drumline, Ensemble, Marching band, Orchestra, and Yearbook Staff.

== Notable alumni ==
- DeSean Bishop, Tennessee Volunteers running back
- Devin Harper, NFL player
- Thomas Harper, NFL player
- J. J. McCleskey, NFL player

== Honors and awards ==
- Knoxville's Best Award
- Knoxville's Best Teacher Award
- Leadership Education
- Five 21st Century Classrooms
- Optimist Club Sportsmanship Award
- Graduating classes averaging over $1.99 million in scholarships
- UT Whittle Scholars
- 7 National Merit Finalists
