= Terrence Scott =

American gridiron football player (born 1986)

Terence Scott
No. 89
- Position: Wide receiver

Personal information
- Born: September 25, 1986 (age 40); Macon, Georgia, U.S.
- Listed height: 5 ft 11 in (1.80 m)
- Listed weight: 170 lb (77 kg)

Career information
- High school: Central (Knoxville, Tennessee)
- College: Oregon
- NFL draft: 2009: undrafted

Career history
- 2009–2010: BC Lions
- Stats at CFL.ca

Terence Scott (born September 25, 1986) is a former professional Canadian football wide receiver. He most recently played for the BC Lions of the Canadian Football League (CFL). He was signed by the Lions as a street free agent in 2009. He played high school football for Central High School (Knoxville, Tennessee), and college football for the Oregon Ducks. Scott was released by the Lions on July 2, 2010.
