= Bryce Brentz =

American baseball player (born 1988)

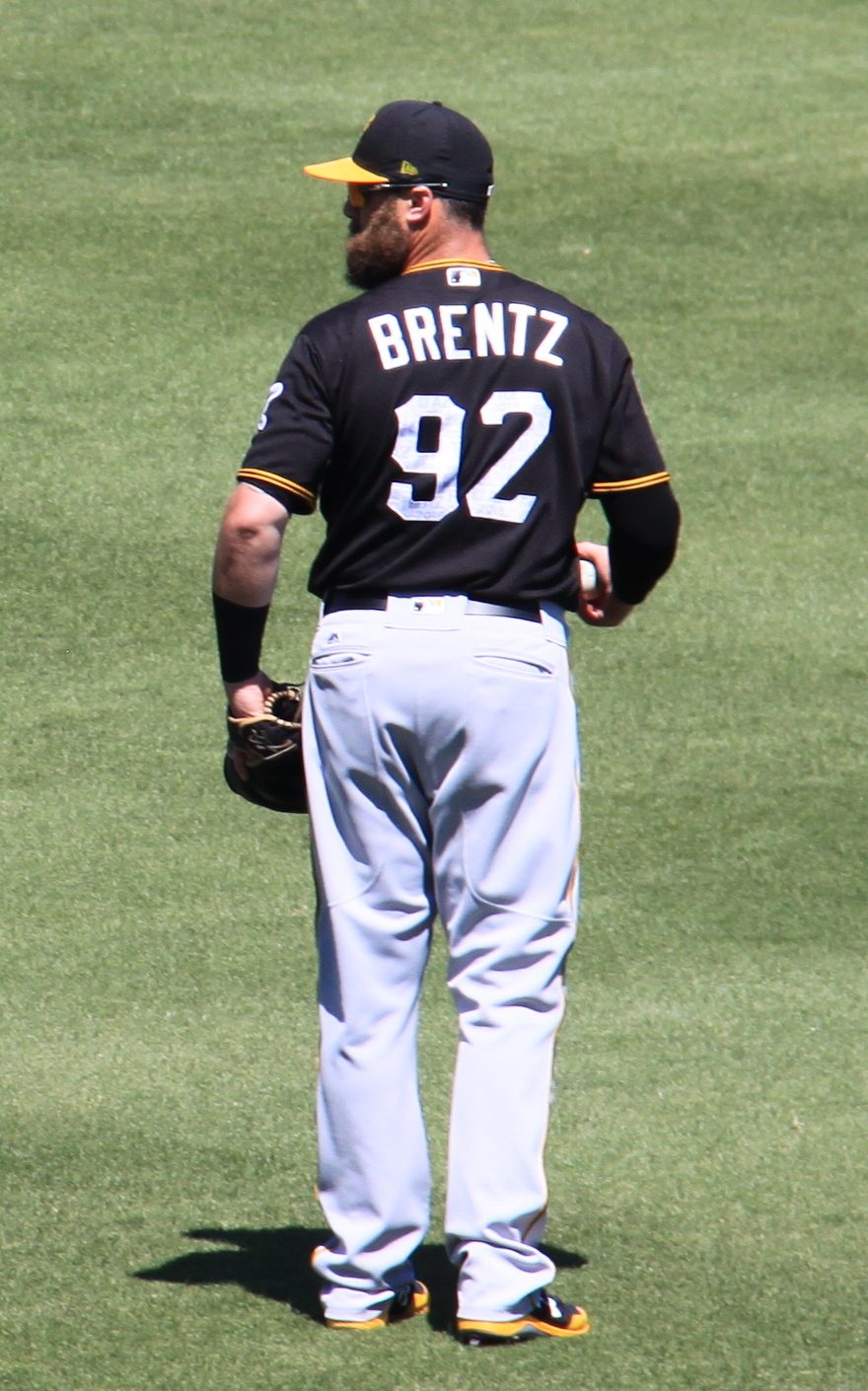
- Brentz with the Pittsburgh Pirates in 2018
- Left fielder
- Born: December 30, 1988 (age 37); Knoxville, Tennessee, U.S.
- Batted: Right Threw: Right

MLB debut
- September 17, 2014, for the Boston Red Sox

Last MLB appearance
- August 10, 2016, for the Boston Red Sox

MLB statistics
- Batting average: .287
- Home runs: 1
- Runs batted in: 9
- Stats at Baseball Reference

Teams
- Boston Red Sox (2014, 2016)

Bryce Everett Brentz (born December 30, 1988) is an American former professional baseball left fielder. He played in Major League Baseball (MLB) for the Boston Red Sox. During the 2014 and 2016 seasons, he appeared in a total of 34 MLB games with Boston. He bats and throws right-handed, and is listed at 6 feet 0 inches (1.83 m) and 215 pounds (98 kg).

== Amateur career ==
Brentz attended South-Doyle High School in Knoxville, Tennessee. He then enrolled at Middle Tennessee State University, where he played college baseball for the Middle Tennessee Blue Raiders as a pitcher and an outfielder. He was a consensus All-American in 2009.

== Professional career ==
=== Boston Red Sox ===
Brentz was drafted by the Boston Red Sox in the first round of the 2010 Major League Baseball draft.

Entering 2013, Brentz was ranked as the sixth best prospect in the Red Sox minor league system. He was preparing to participate in spring training of 2013 until he accidentally shot himself in the leg while cleaning his handgun during the offseason. Brentz returned to the Pawtucket Red Sox of the Triple-A International League, but missed time in July and August due to a torn meniscus. He posted a .262 average with 19 home runs and 64 RBI in 88 games between Pawtucket and the Gulf Coast Red Sox, where he completed a rehab assignment, while tying with David Chester for the most home runs in the system.

Brentz was added to the Red Sox' 40-man roster on November 20, 2013, in order to be protected from the Rule 5 draft. He played for Pawtucket in 2014 and was part of the team that won the International League Governors' Cup. After Pawtucket lost the one-game Triple-A World Series to the Omaha Storm Chasers of the Pacific Coast League, the Red Sox promoted Brentz to the major leagues, and he made his major league debut on September 17. He recorded a double off Pittsburgh Pirates pitcher Francisco Liriano in his first game for his initial Major League hit.

In 2015, Brentz missed time from May 20 through August 2 with a right hamstring strain. In 59 games with the PawSox that year, he hit .232 with 8 home runs and 26 RBI.

In 2016, Brentz missed the beginning of the season, from April 6 to May 6, with an oblique injury. In 54 games with Pawtucket and 12 games of rehab for the Portland Sea Dogs, he hit a combined .242 with five home runs and 24 RBI. He also had a stint with the Red Sox that year, hitting .279 with one home run and seven RBI in 25 games. Brentz hit his first MLB home run on June 26, 2016, off Rangers pitcher Martin Pérez.

On March 31, 2017, Brentz was outrighted off Boston's 40-man roster and accepted the assignment to Pawtucket. He is out of options. He was named International League Player of the Week for the week of June 18. He was also named an IL Mid-Season All-Star and a Triple-A Home Run Derby participant. Brentz, who hit a total of 38 home runs in the derby, defeated Daniel Vogelbach in the final round to win the derby title. On November 2, Brentz had his contract purchased from Triple-A.

=== New York Mets ===
On February 20, 2018, Brentz was traded to the Pittsburgh Pirates in exchange for cash considerations. He was placed on outright waivers on March 24. He did not play for the Pirates organization, as on March 26, he was claimed off waivers by the New York Mets, and was outrighted to Triple-A on March 28. Overall during 2018, Brentz batted .263 in 57 minor league games. He declared free agency on October 5.

=== Boston Red Sox (second stint) ===
On December 23, 2018, Brentz signed a minor league deal to return to the Boston Red Sox, and was assigned to the Triple–A Pawtucket Red Sox. He appeared in 95 games with Pawtucket during the 2019 season, batting .216 with 18 home runs and 50 RBI. Brentz elected free agency following the season on November 4, 2019.

=== Somerset Patriots ===
On January 31, 2020, Brentz signed with the Somerset Patriots of the Atlantic League of Professional Baseball. He did not play a game for the team due to the cancellation of the ALPB season because of the COVID-19 pandemic and became a free agent after the season.

=== Kane County Cougars ===
On November 17, 2021, Brentz signed with the Kane County Cougars of the American Association of Professional Baseball. Brentz played 7 games for the Cougars, during which he hit .222 with one home run and one RBI. On July 31, 2022, Brentz was released by the Cougars.

== Coaching career ==
On August 24, 2023, Brentz was hired by the Middle Tennessee State University to serve as the new assistant softball coach.
