= Zaevion Dobson =

American high school football player, Authur Ashe Courage Award recipient

- Born: Zaevion William Dobson; June 28, 2000; Knoxville, Tennessee, U.S.
- Died: December 17, 2015 (aged 15); Knoxville, Tennessee, U.S.
- Awards: Arthur Ashe Courage Award (posthumous)

Zaevion William Dobson (June 28, 2000 – December 17, 2015) was a school football player at Fulton High School in Knoxville, Tennessee. He became the recipient of the Arthur Ashe Courage Award, for shielding three girls from gunfire.

== Biography ==
Zaevion William Dobson was born on June 28, 2000, in Knoxville, Tennessee, to parents Zenobia Dobson and Lionell Kimber. Dobson has two brothers, Zack Dobson and Markastin Taylor. He was a football player wearing the number 24 at Fulton High School, playing for the Falcons.

=== Death and legacy ===
On December 17, 2015, Dobson shielded three girls from an apparent random drive-by shooting in his neighborhood. Dobson was shot and killed. The suspects' vehicle later crashed, the driver had suffered a gunshot wound and later died, and the other two suspects fled the scene but were later captured. Police believe Dobson's death was the last of two other related shootings earlier in the evening.

For his actions, Dobson posthumously received the Arthur Ashe Courage Award in July 2016. His mother accepted the award on his behalf.

To honor Dobson's legacy, Tennessee Volunteer and Knoxville native Todd Kelly Jr. elected to wear Dobson's number (24) for the 2016 college football season.

On October 27, 2017, a ceremony was held at the Falcons' final game. Dobson's number was retired, as he would have been a senior and would have had his last game that night.

On February 2, 2018, Christopher Drone Bassett was sentenced to life in prison, while Richard Gregory Williams III and Kipling Colbert Jr. received sentences of over 100 years in prison.

The Change Center was opened in December 2018 partly as inspiration from Dobson's acts.
