= Lee Smith (American football) =

American football player (born 1987)

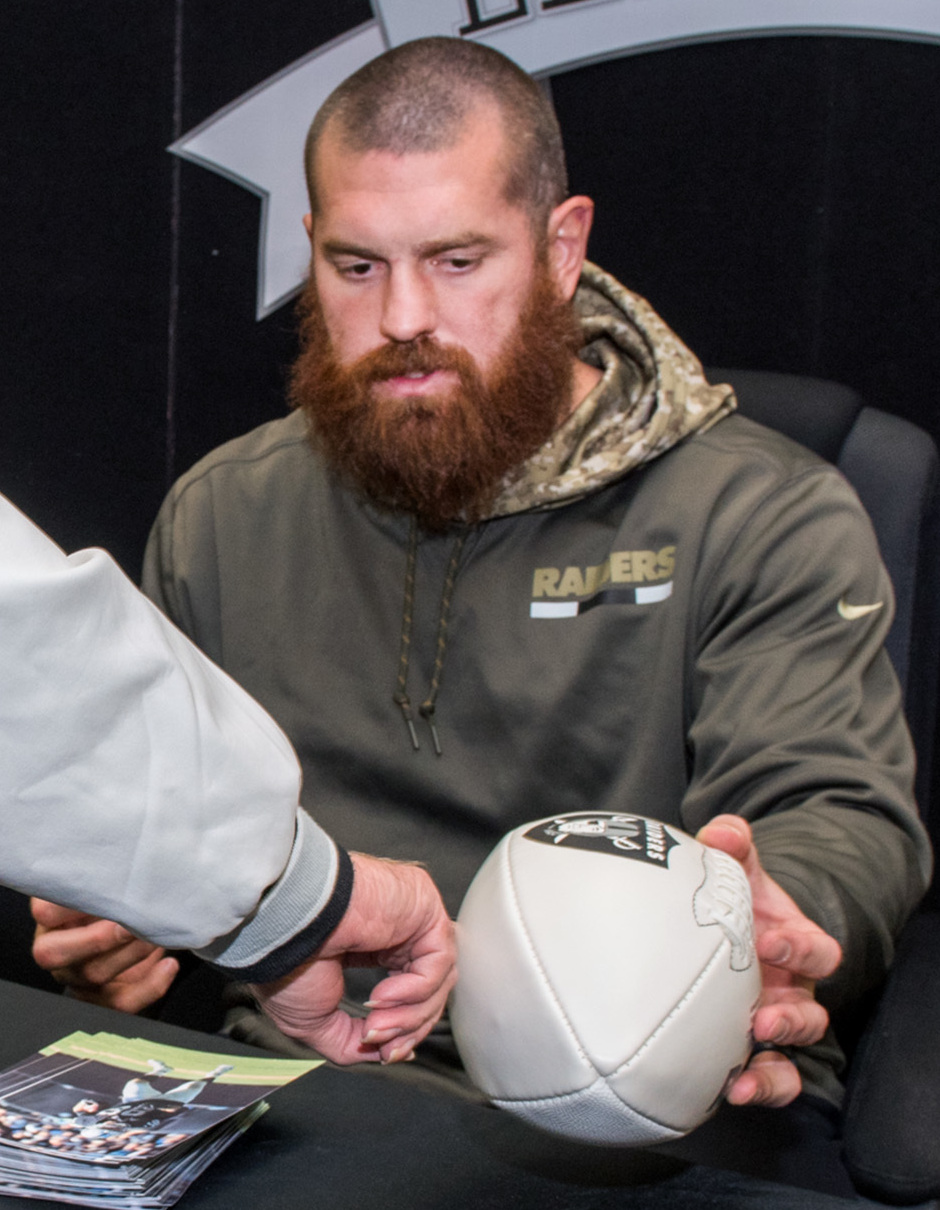
- Smith in 2017

No. 85, 86
- Position: Tight end

Personal information
- Born: November 21, 1987 (age 38); Powell, Tennessee, U.S.
- Listed height: 6 ft 6 in (1.98 m)
- Listed weight: 265 lb (120 kg)

Career information
- High school: Powell
- College: Marshall
- NFL draft: 2011: 5th round, 159th overall pick

Career history
- New England Patriots (2011)*; Buffalo Bills (2011–2014); Oakland Raiders (2015–2018); Buffalo Bills (2019–2020); Atlanta Falcons (2021)
- * Offseason or practice squad member only

Awards and highlights
- Second-team All-C-USA (2010)

Career NFL statistics
- Receptions: 73
- Receiving yards: 523
- Receiving touchdowns: 11
- Stats at Pro Football Reference

Joseph Lere "Lee" Smith (born November 21, 1987) is an American former professional football player who was a tight end for 11 seasons in the National Football League (NFL) with the New England Patriots, Buffalo Bills, Oakland Raiders and Atlanta Falcons. He played college football for the Marshall Thundering Herd, and was selected by the Patriots in the fifth round of the 2011 NFL draft. In late January 2022 he announced he would retire from the NFL.

== College career ==
Smith originally committed and enrolled at the University of Tennessee, where his father Daryle played. However, after being charged with DUI on campus, he was immediately dismissed by head coach Phillip Fulmer. Smith would then enroll at Marshall University.

Smith shared playing time with tight end, Cody Slate, throughout most of his first three seasons at Marshall. As a full-time starter in 2010, Smith finished the year with career highs in receiving yards, receptions, and touchdowns. He also was named to the Conference USA All-Academic team and invited to the Senior Bowl.

== Professional career ==
=== Pre-draft ===
On January 21, 2011, it was announced that Smith had been invited to the 2011 Senior Bowl. Although he was a late invitee, Smith accepted his invitation a week later. He was a part of the Cincinnati Bengals' head coach Marvin Lewis' North team that lost to the South 24–10. Smith was one of 16 tight ends who received an invitation to perform at the NFL Combine. He performed all of the required positional and combine drills and tied Wisconsin's Lance Kendricks for second among tight ends in the bench press. Smith also finished last of the 16 tight ends in the 40-yard dash. On March 17, 2011, Smith opted to participate at Marshall's pro day, along with Martez Wilson, Mario Harvey, and five others. He chose to run his 40-yard dash (4.99), 20-yard dash (2.89), 10-yard dash (1.72), and positional drills for the team representatives and scouts from ten NFL teams. Smith was projected to be a sixth or seventh round by the majority of NFL draft experts and analysts. He was ranked as the tenth best tight end prospect in the draft by NFLDraftScout.com.

Pre-draft measurables
| Height | Weight | Arm length | Hand span | Wingspan | 40-yard dash | 10-yard split | 20-yard split | 20-yard shuttle | Three-cone drill | Vertical jump | Broad jump | Bench press |
|---|---|---|---|---|---|---|---|---|---|---|---|---|
| 6 ft 5 3/4 in (1.97 m) | 266 lb (121 kg) | 34 3/8 in (0.87 m) | 9 3/4 in (0.25 m) | 6 ft 7 3/4 in (2.03 m) | 4.99 s | 1.72 s | 2.89 s | 4.28 s | 7.13 s | 29.0 in (0.74 m) | 9 ft 0 in (2.74 m) | 25 reps |
All values from NFL Combine/Pro Day

=== New England Patriots ===
The New England Patriots selected Smith in the fifth round with the 159th overall pick in the 2011 NFL draft. He was the eighth tight end selected in 2011. Smith entered his first training camp facing stiff competition for a roster spot. He competed with Alge Crumpler, Rob Gronkowski, Aaron Hernandez, and Carson Butler. On September 3, 2011, the Patriots released Smith as a part of their final roster cuts.

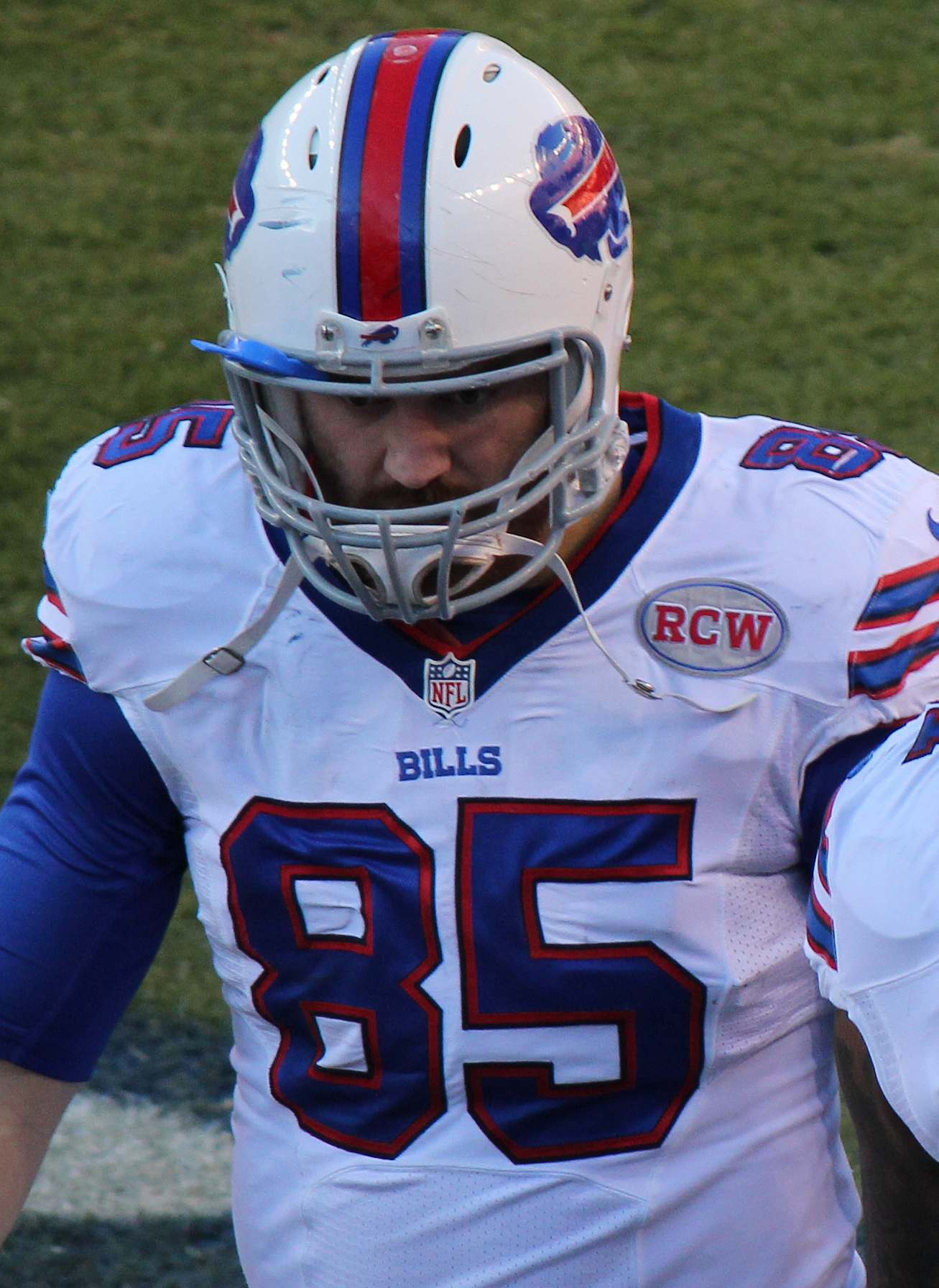
Smith with the Bills in 2014

=== Buffalo Bills (first stint) ===
==== 2011 ====
On September 4, 2011, Smith was claimed off waivers by the Buffalo Bills to provide depth at their thin tight end position.

Upon arriving, he was the Bills' third tight end on their depth chart behind Scott Chandler and Mike Caussin. On October 2, 2011, Smith made his professional regular season debut in the Bills' 23–20 loss at the Cincinnati Bengals. He became the backup tight end after Mike Caussin suffered a knee injury and was placed on injured/reserve on November 7, 2011. During a Week 12 matchup at the New York Jets, Smith made his first career start as the Bills lost 28–24. On December 4, 2011, he caught a season-high three passes for 11-yards during a 23–17 loss to the Tennessee Titans. He entered the game after Scott Chandler injured his ankle and was unable to return. He finished his rookie season with four receptions for 11 yards in three starts and ten games.

==== 2012 ====
He competed with Scott Chandler, Mike Caussin, Kevin Brock, and Fendi Onobun.

=== Oakland Raiders ===
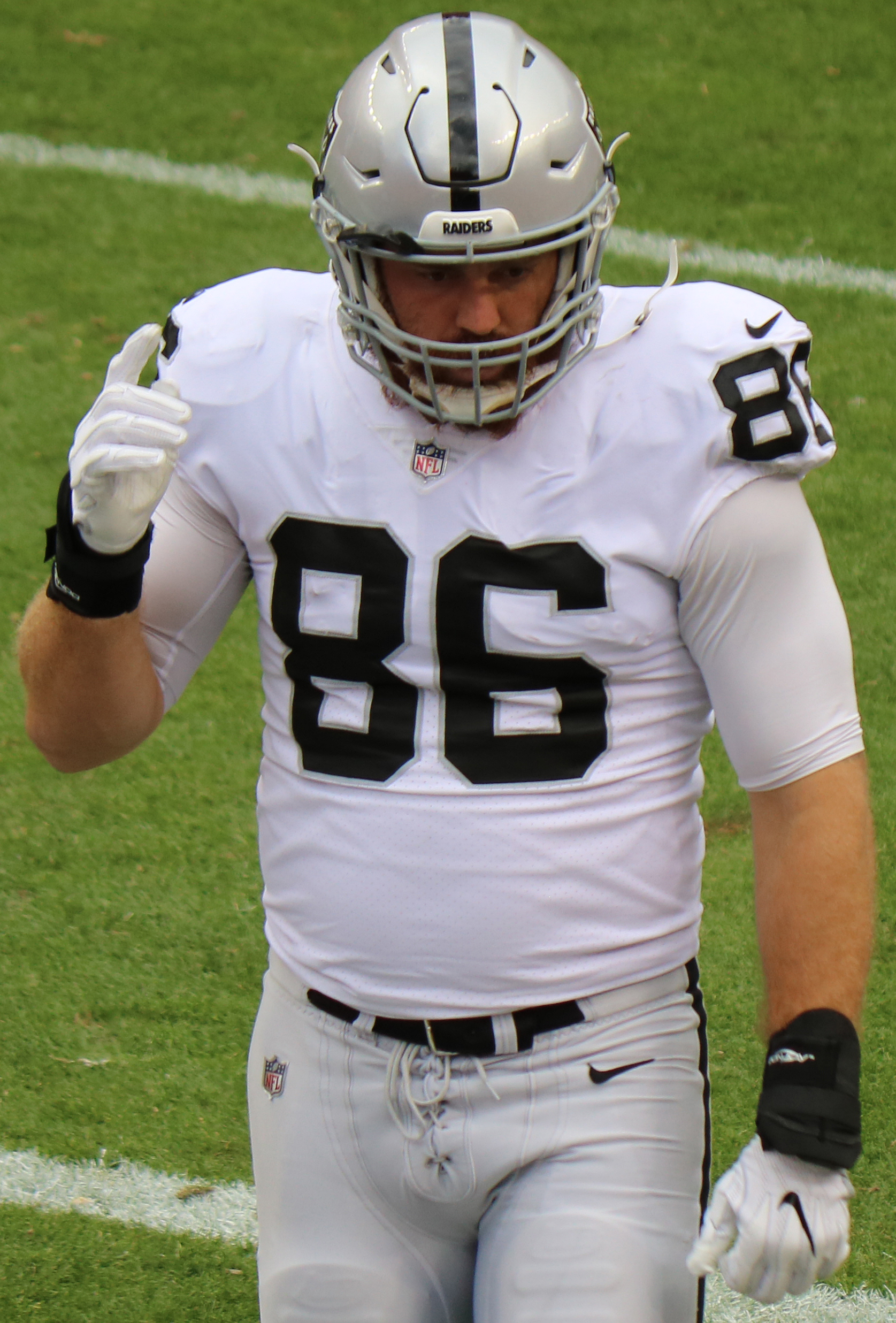
Smith with the Raiders in 2017

On March 10, 2015, Smith signed a three-year contract with the Oakland Raiders. He was placed on injured reserve on October 5, 2016.

On March 14, 2018, Smith re-signed with the Raiders.

On May 2, 2019, Smith was released by the Raiders.

=== Buffalo Bills (second stint) ===
On May 13, 2019, Smith signed a three-year, $9 million contract with the Buffalo Bills.

Smith was placed on the reserve/COVID-19 list by the Bills on October 24, 2020, and activated on October 30. In Week 16 of the 2020 season, against the New England Patriots, Smith caught a four-yard touchdown pass from Josh Allen.

=== Atlanta Falcons ===
On March 17, 2021, Smith was traded to the Atlanta Falcons for a 2022 seventh-round pick.

On January 25, 2022, Smith announced his retirement.

== Post-playing career ==
Following his retirement, Smith announced that he would be opening Triple F Training facility in Knoxville, Tennessee, an elite training center for young athletes, where he hopes to mentor young men facing turbulent home environments like the one he grew up in.

== Personal life ==
Smith is the son of former Dallas Cowboys offensive tackle Daryle Smith. Smith resides in Knoxville, Tennessee, with his wife, Alisha, and four children, Brody, Amanda, Brock and Addison.
