= Get Fuzzy =

American comic strip (1999-2013)

- Logo for Get Fuzzy comic strip
- Author: Darby Conley
- Website: www.gocomics.com/getfuzzy
- Current status/schedule: Concluded, in reruns
- Launch date: September 6, 1999
- End date: November 9, 2013 (Daily); February 3, 2019 (Sunday)
- Syndicate(s): United Feature Syndicate/ Andrews McMeel Syndication
- Publisher: Andrews McMeel Publishing
- Genre(s): Humor, Pets, Family

Get Fuzzy is an American gag-a-day comic strip written and drawn by Darby Conley. It features Boston advertising executive Rob Wilco and his two anthropomorphic pets, a dog, Satchel Pooch, and a cat, Bucky Katt. While there have been no new comics produced since 2019, the reruns continue to appear in newspapers.

The strip's humor comes from the conflict between Bucky's and Satchel's personalities, which are extreme stereotypes of cats and dogs. Sweet, trusting, naïve Satchel is routinely subjected to the exploitation of cruel, self-centered Bucky, who is always torturing the poor canine. Rob, the middleman, is often frazzled from dealing with them, or more specifically, from dealing with Bucky's destructive nature and overall nastiness. The three characters live in an apartment on Boston's Longwood Avenue. Get Fuzzy often eschews the traditional "setup-punchline" format of most funnies, instead building on absurd dialog between characters.

The title of the strip comes from a concert poster that Conley once created for his brother's band, the Fuzzy Sprouts. "Life's too short to be cool," the poster read, "Get Fuzzy."

== Publication history ==
Get Fuzzy was first published on September 6, 1999 by United Feature Syndicate (now Andrews McMeel Syndication). Initially appearing in 75 newspapers nationally, the strip quickly gained popularity. It currently appears in some 400 newspapers worldwide.

=== Reruns ===
In 2011, Get Fuzzy began to incorporate reprinted strips into its daily rotation, initially alternating from week to week with new strips. The reruns became more frequent, and by November 2013, the daily strips consisted entirely of strips from previous years. New Sunday strips continued appearing sporadically until February 2019.

The lack of new content caused a decline in the popularity of Get Fuzzy, and in some cases reader feedback polls were conducted as to whether to keep the strip. One of these was conducted by The Washington Post in October 2013; the paper cited the reruns as the reason for the strip's lack of support and announced that they would be dropping it from the paper. The Seattle Times, which stopped carrying Get Fuzzy on March 3, 2014, said their reasoning was "because the creator is no longer producing new installments."

== Characters ==
=== Main characters ===
Rob Wilco is the "owner" of Satchel and Bucky and serves as the straight man sandwiched between Satchel's goofy naïveté and Bucky's cynical hostility. In the Get Fuzzy universe, virtually all animals talk, a situation that no one seems to find odd. Rob is portrayed as a bit of an everyman: a mediocre performer in a job he dislikes, not successful romantically, and an all-around relatively quiet guy with a poor haircut and chronic lower back pain. His passions, which often border on obsessions, include sports (particularly the Boston Red Sox and the New Zealand All Blacks), video games, books, and guitarist Leo Kottke. He is also a strict vegetarian, due to what he feels are too cruel methods of killing the animals. The character was named for two of Conley's classmates at South-Doyle High School (then 'Doyle') in Knoxville, Tennessee who were named "Rob".

Bucky B. Katt is Rob's self-absorbed and cynical Siamese cat. His ears are nearly always drawn laid back flat on his head, a feline sign of defiance, aggressiveness, and he is missing an upper canine tooth. The Humane Society found Bucky huddled on a trash can, while the cat was only a few weeks old, in Hackensack, New Jersey, later to be adopted by Rob. While Bucky's father has never been mentioned, Bucky gave his mother's maiden name on a credit card application as "Tricky Woo," an allusion to the ludicrously pampered (but in fact good-natured) pet dog of that name in James Herriot's stories of his experiences as a vet. Bucky lives in a dresser located in the hall closet of Rob's apartment because he refuses to share a room with Satchel. On most outdoor excursions, when Rob is present, Bucky is carried in a strap-on "Bundle-O-Joy" baby carrier, referenced as a way of keeping the cat out of trouble. Bucky's aggression is often directed at Satchel, although his attempts usually fail as Satchel is too kind or unaware to play along with Bucky's often ignorant dabs at sarcasm. Three obsessions dominate Bucky's life: his hatred of a neighborhood ferret named Fungo Squiggly; his desire to stop the "monkey invasion"; and wanting to film a movie or TV show about himself.

Bucky owns a miniature teddy bear named "Smacky", obtained by his refusing to exchange toys with Satchel at a "McDoodles" restaurant even though each had the toy the other wanted. It is one of the few objects to which he shows affection. As Christmas gifts, Bucky received two other bears which he named "Cracker" and "Punk", but they do not appear as often as Smacky. Bucky also owns a rag doll named "Ms. Pretty", similar to Barbie. Bucky claims to be a fan of the "Yankers", even wearing a Yankees cap throughout the series, although it appears more to be an opportunity to annoy Rob because he wouldn't let him wear his Boston Red Sox baseball cap (he calls it the "'B' is for 'Bucky' hat") than anything else. Bucky identifies as Republican as shown in strips dated July 22, 2007 and September 12, 2008 among others. Bucky has been shown to hold extremely reactionary political viewpoints throughout the strip, but these may not stem from actual convictions as much as a desire to antagonize Rob and Satchel, both tolerant in their views. Bucky is also frequently shown to have francophobic and anti-Quebec sentiments. He regularly says words like frog and canuck, although these (like his politics and support of the Yankees) appear to stem from the desire to antagonize Satchel for his background, rather than racism or nativism.

For all his aggressiveness, Bucky is a part of the family. When he is absorbed in some scheme, Rob and Satchel are his preferred audience; when he is not, he does take an interest in their problems, usually looking for preposterous solutions and eager to take credit for any positive development.

Satchel Pooch is Rob's overweight, naïve, and easily amused dog. His father, named Copernicus, a Labrador Retriever and retired guide dog, and his mother, a Shar Pei, live in Chéticamp, Nova Scotia. It is suggested by Rob's friend Joe Doman, that he is named after the Baseball Hall of Fame player Satchel Paige. Satchel is kind, gentle, and sympathetic. These traits, coupled with his naïveté and gullibility, make him a natural target for the scheming Bucky. Satchel's personality serves as foil to that of Bucky's: easy to please, optimistic to the extreme, having little more common sense than Bucky, and perfectly content to peacefully coexist with everyone. He is good friends with Bucky's nemesis, Fungo Squiggly, much to Bucky's dismay.

True to his character, Satchel takes a neutral position in the ongoing Major League Baseball feud between professed New York Yankees fan Bucky and rabid Boston Red Sox fan Rob. Satchel occasionally expresses support for the Chicago Cubs-although he once was punished by being forced to wear a Cubs hat, dubbed the "hat of shame" in reference to the team's long record of futility. Satchel is also proud of his Canadian and European heritage, taking the time to watch Queen Elizabeth II whenever the royal figure is on television. Satchel holds to a very liberal political viewpoint and is an animal rights supporter; occasionally asking Rob for money to donate to PETA or Greenpeace. Although Satchel cannot tell time, he wears a watch that he calls "Handy".

=== Secondary characters ===
Joe Doman, Rob's friend and co-worker. One of the few people who gets along reasonably well with Bucky and has pet-sat Bucky and Satchel a few times. Although Joe was frequently seen in the strips early years, this has decreased since taking a job in France. Joe is also a fan of rugby, having worn a jersey of the Scottish national team on a golf outing.

Francis Wilco, Rob's father. A retired firefighter and former member of the United States Marine Corps. He reluctantly pet-sits Bucky and Satchel from time to time, has thinning hair, and is usually pictured with a cigarette dangling from his mouth.

Fungo Squiggly, the pet ferret of the neighboring Garcia family, who is Satchel's friend and Bucky's rival. Fungo does not have any audible speaking lines throughout the entire strip, but is able to communicate by writing out his thoughts (although Satchel can apparently understand ferret-speak). Fungo and Bucky take the impetus given by their rivalry as a chance to keep their hatred for each other going strong by setting traps for each other or playing tricks, such as Bucky's challenging Fungo to a duel or Fungo's stealing Bucky's closet space. The exact motive for Bucky's hatred of Fungo is unexplained, although it is possible that Bucky may mistake Fungo for some sort of rodent, as Bucky has referred to him as a "rat" or "rodent" at various times.

Chubby Huggs, a portly, interminably cheerful cat who believes positive reinforcement (mostly through hugging) solves all problems. Rob refers to him as the Dalai Lama of cats because of his peacemaking abilities. Once Chubby is locked in his hug position, he is unable to move for 10 minutes—a fact Rob used against him by tricking Chubby into hugging a teddy bear tightly so Satchel could carry him home. He once had a "little mouse friend" named Fowly Mouse who hated him and was vicious toward him, even though Chubby would take the threats as words of kindness, à la Ignatz Mouse and Krazy Kat.

Mac Manc McManx, Bucky's cousin from Manchester, England. Mac speaks in British slang and is an ardent supporter of Manchester City Football Club. Mac's father arrived in England during the First Gulf War from a place Mac only remembers being called "Otis", so Rob tells Bucky that his family is from Massachusetts, to which Bucky replies, "Blast! I'm a filthy communist!!!". Mac's mother is from Hartlepool. Mac spent three and a half years at Rob's apartment and has come back and forth since that time. It is implied that Rob originally let Mac stay at the apartment since he and Satchel never came up with an effective way of getting Mac to leave.

Foodar is a Canadian cat with a radar-like-seventh sense (according to Bucky all cats have six senses, the sixth being knowing which humans are afraid of them or dislike them so they can sit on their laps) that allows him to detect food at great distances (though he doesn't bother detecting fruit or vegetables). His name is a portmanteau of 'food' and 'radar'.

Oreo is Satchel's friend and love interest from his puppy days, but over the years she seems to have lost interest in him. She has the fur patterns of a Border Collie, has black and white fur, and wears a collar with a heart-shaped medallion.

Ira Chihuahua is a generally irritable Chihuahua who first appeared in Satchel's dog conference. Ira prefers to go by his initial, I (as a play on the term "ai chihuahua"). He apparently likes to play in garbage and once contracted worms.

Shakespug is a small pug who wears a green dishwashing glove, and usually applies Shakespearean quotes to his speech. Shakespug also seems to understand Mac Manc McManx the best through his "Brit-speak".

Motor is a dog who is Satchel's friend. He is 3/4 Belgian Tervuren and gets offended when someone calls him a German Shepherd.

== Books ==
=== Collections ===
Title	Publication Date	ISBN	Strips Collected
The Dog Is Not a Toy (House Rule #4)	April 15, 2001	ISBN 0-7407-1392-2	September 6, 1999 – June 17, 2000
Fuzzy Logic	April 1, 2002	ISBN 0-7407-2198-4	June 18, 2000 – March 25, 2001
The Get Fuzzy Experience: Are You Bucksperienced	April 2, 2003	ISBN 0-7407-3300-1	March 26, 2001 – January 12, 2002
Blueprint for Disaster	October 1, 2003	ISBN 0-7407-3808-9	January 13, 2002 – November 9, 2002
Say Cheesy	May 28, 2005	ISBN 0-7407-4663-4	November 10, 2002 – August 31, 2003
Scrum Bums	September 1, 2006	ISBN 0-7407-5001-1	September 1, 2003 – June 13, 2004
I'm Ready for My Movie Contract	September 1, 2007	ISBN 978-0-7407-6922-1	June 14, 2004 – March 26, 2005
Take Our Cat, Please!	May 1, 2008	ISBN 978-0-7407-7095-1	March 27, 2005 – January 29, 2006 (Note: May 13, 2005 strip is excluded due to its resulting controversy.)
Ignorance, Thy Name Is Bucky	April 21, 2009	ISBN 978-0-7407-8098-1	January 30, 2006 – December 9, 2006
Dumbheart	October 20, 2009	ISBN 978-0-7407-9189-5	December 10, 2006 – October 7, 2007
Masters of the Nonsenseverse	December 13, 2011	ISBN 978-1-4494-2020-8	October 8, 2007 – August 9, 2008
Survival of the Filthiest	May 29, 2012	ISBN 978-1-4494-2190-8	August 10, 2008 – July 5, 2009
The Birth of Canis	May 28, 2013	ISBN 978-1-4494-2776-4	July 6, 2009 – May 23, 2010
The Fuzzy Bunch	October 22, 2013	ISBN 978-1-4494-2939-3	May 24, 2010 – April 23, 2011
You Can't Fight Crazy	November 4, 2014	ISBN 978-1-4494-5994-9	April 24, 2011 – July 14, 2012
Clean Up on Aisle Stupid	November 17, 2015	ISBN 978-1-4494-6294-9	July 15, 2012 – May 25, 2014
Catabunga!	November 14, 2017	ISBN 978-1-4494-8710-2	June 1, 2014 – April 23, 2017

=== Treasuries ===
Treasuries contain two collections in one binding with some color strips.

Title	Date	ISBN	Notes
Groovitude	September 2, 2002	ISBN 0-7407-2894-6	Contains The Dog Is Not a Toy and Fuzzy Logic
Bucky Katt's Big Book of Fun	April 2004	ISBN 0-7407-4136-5	Contains The Get Fuzzy Experience and Blueprint for Disaster
Loserpalooza	May 7, 2007	ISBN 978-0-7407-5709-9	Contains Say Cheesy and Scrum Bums
The Potpourrific Great Big Grab Bag of Get Fuzzy	September 1, 2008	ISBN 978-0-7407-7367-9	Contains I'm Ready for My Movie Contract and Take Our Cat, Please
Treasury of the Lost Litter Box	May 4, 2010	ISBN 978-0-7407-9335-6	Contains Ignorance, Thy Name Is Bucky and Dumbheart
The Stinking	November 20, 2012	ISBN 978-1-4494-2798-6	Contains Masters of the Nonsenseverse and Survival of the Filthiest
Jerktastic Park	May 6, 2014	ISBN 978-1-4494-4658-1	Contains The Birth of Canis and The Fuzzy Bunch
I'm Gluten Furious	April 19, 2016	ISBN 978-1-4494-6301-4	Contains You Can't Fight Crazy and Clean Up on Aisle Stupid

== Reception and awards ==
Conley received the National Cartoonist Society Newspaper Comic Strip Award in 2002 for his work on Get Fuzzy.

=== Controversies ===
Residents of Pittsburgh, Pennsylvania reacted angrily to the October 30, 2003 strip, in which Pittsburgh—in an apparent inside joke—was made out as smelly. Conley said he received hate mail and even death threats in response. An apology promised by Conley took an unexpected form; his November 17 strip questioned why the Pittsburgh joke caused such an uproar, and noted that several protesters stated that New Jersey smelled worse than Pittsburgh. Satchel closes the strip by explaining that the original strip "should have made it more clear that it was [nearby borough] Sewickley Heights that smells", coupled with a post-it note advertising an apology to Sewickley Heights.

In 2005, Bob Lobel, the longtime sports director for WBZ-TV in Boston, filed a libel suit against Darby Conley, United Feature Syndicate, and The Standard-Times of New Bedford, Massachusetts for implying that Lobel was intoxicated while on air; the lawsuit was settled out-of-court in November 2005.
