= Daryle Smith =

American football player (1964–2010)

No. 75, 79, 70, 63, 58, 51
- Position: Offensive tackle

Personal information
- Born: January 18, 1964; Knoxville, Tennessee, U.S.
- Died: February 11, 2010 (aged 46); Knoxville, Tennessee, U.S.
- Listed height: 6 ft 5 in (1.96 m)
- Listed weight: 277 lb (126 kg)

Career information
- High school: Powell (Powell, Tennessee)
- College: Tennessee
- NFL draft: 1987: undrafted

Career history
- Seattle Seahawks (1987)*; Dallas Cowboys (1987–1988); Seattle Seahawks (1989)*; Cleveland Browns (1989); Philadelphia Eagles (1990–1992); Minnesota Vikings (1993)*; Toronto Argonauts (1993); Sacramento Gold Miners (1994); San Antonio Texans (1995); Winnipeg Blue Bombers (1996)
- * Offseason or practice squad member only

Career NFL statistics
- Games played: 60
- Games started: 16
- Fumble recoveries: 1
- Stats at Pro Football Reference

Daryle Ray Smith (January 18, 1964 – February 11, 2010) was an American professional football offensive tackle in the National Football League (NFL) for the Dallas Cowboys, Cleveland Browns and Philadelphia Eagles. He played college football at the University of Tennessee.

== Early life ==
Smith was born and raised in Knoxville, Tennessee. He attended Powell High School, where he was an All-state defensive end and tight end. He averaged 23 yards per reception during his high school career. He also practiced basketball.

He accepted a football scholarship from the University of Tennessee to play as a defensive tackle. As a redshirt freshman, he saw action at both defensive tackle and tight end. As sophomore, he was moved to the offensive line, where he was a backup tackle.

As a junior in 1985, he split time with David Douglas, before becoming a starter at left tackle midway through the season. He was part of a team that won the school's first SEC championship in 15 years and also the Sugar Bowl against the University of Miami.

As a senior, he entered the season as the starter at left tackle, but a knee injury limited him to only 8 starts.

== Professional career ==
=== Seattle Seahawks (first stint) ===
Smith was signed as an undrafted free agent by the Seattle Seahawks after the 1987 NFL draft. He was released before the start of the season.

=== Dallas Cowboys ===
After the players went on a strike on the third week of the 1987 season, those games were canceled (reducing the 16 game season to 15) and the NFL decided that the games would be played with replacement players. Smith was signed to be a part of the Dallas Cowboys replacement team, that was given the mock name "Rhinestone Cowboys" by the media.

He ended up playing well in those 3 contests as the starter at left tackle and was kept for the rest of the season. He started 4 additional games after Mark Tuinei suffered a knee injury against the Minnesota Vikings. He showed pass protection to be his strength, shutting out All-Pro Dexter Manley in the thirteenth game.

The next year, he started 4 games in place of an injured Tuinei. In the fifth game he suffered broken ribs that contributed to rookie Dave Widell passing him on the depth chart. On July 25, 1989, he was traded to the Seattle Seahawks in exchange for a ninth round choice (#230-Leon Perry).

=== Seattle Seahawks (second stint) ===
On August 29, 1989, it was reported that Smith left the Seattle Seahawks training camp.

=== Cleveland Browns ===
Smith signed with the Cleveland Browns at midseason in 1989. He was released after playing in 4 games on November 2.

=== Philadelphia Eagles ===
In 1991, Smith after being waived in training camp on August 26, was re-signed to play left tackle and on October 13, against the New Orleans Saints he was named the starter, after Ron Heller moved to the right side to take over the benched number one draft choice Antone Davis. Due to a groin injury Smith suffered, Davis regained his right tackle job and Heller took over the left tackle position for the rest of the year.

On October 25, 1992, against the Phoenix Cardinals, Smith took over the left tackle position over an injured Heller and started the next 3 games.

=== Minnesota Vikings ===
In 1993, he signed as a free agent with the Minnesota Vikings. He was released on August 30.

=== San Antonio Texans (CFL) ===
In 1995, he signed with the San Antonio Texans of the Canadian Football League. He was activated from the injury list on July 30.

== Personal life ==
Smith became a football assistant coach at Powell High School after his playing career. Less than three weeks after his 46th birthday, Smith slipped into a coma shortly after checking into the University of Tennessee's Medical Center with pancreatic problems.

His son Lee, is a former a tight end in the NFL.
