= Kamren Curl =

American football player (born 1999)

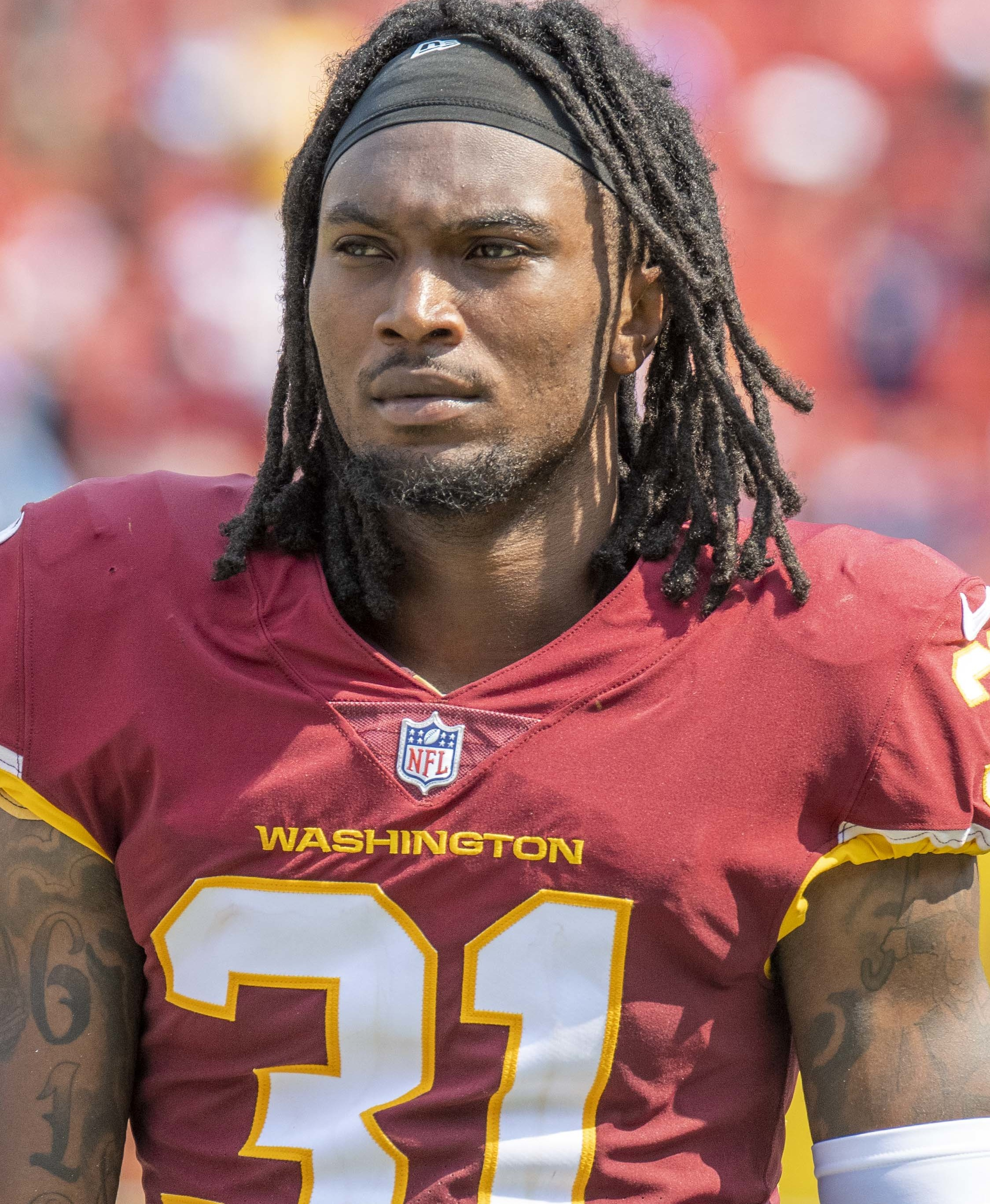
- Curl with the Washington Football Team in 2021

No. 3 – Los Angeles Rams
- Position: Strong safety
- Roster status: Active

Personal information
- Born: March 31, 1999 (age 27); San Diego, California, U.S.
- Listed height: 6 ft 2 in (1.88 m)
- Listed weight: 207 lb (94 kg)

Career information
- High school: Muskogee (Muskogee, Oklahoma)
- College: Arkansas (2017–2019)
- NFL draft: 2020: 7th round, 216th overall pick

Career history
- Washington Football Team / Commanders (2020–2023); Los Angeles Rams (2024–present)

Career NFL statistics as of 2025
- Total tackles: 586
- Sacks: 8.0
- Forced fumbles: 4
- Fumble recoveries: 3
- Pass deflections: 28
- Interceptions: 5
- Defensive touchdowns: 2
- Stats at Pro Football Reference

Kamren Curl (born March 31, 1999) is an American professional football strong safety for the Los Angeles Rams of the National Football League (NFL). He played college football for the Arkansas Razorbacks and was selected by the Washington Football Team in the seventh round of the 2020 NFL draft.

== Early life ==
Curl was born on March 3, 1999, in San Diego, California. He and his family later moved to Muskogee, Oklahoma, where he attended Muskogee High School. In high school, Curl was a standout athlete, playing football and competing in track and field. In football, Curl played both offense and defense. As a senior, he notched 46 catches for 533 yards and six touchdowns on offense and 89 tackes, six pass breakups, and 3 interceptions on defense. He was named to the Muskogee Phoenix All Area team as a defensive back. A three-star recruit, Curl committed to Arkansas over offers from schools such as Baylor, Nebraska, Oklahoma, TCU, Texas, and Texas Tech.

== College career ==
As a true freshman there, he started 12 games at cornerback before switching to safety for his sophomore season, where he had 53 tackles and five pass breakups in 11 games. As a junior, Curl had 76 tackles, two interceptions, and two sacks.

== Professional career ==
External videos
- 2020 Draft Prospects: Kamren Curl

Pre-draft measurables
Height	Weight	Arm length	Hand span	Wingspan	40-yard dash	10-yard split	20-yard split	20-yard shuttle	Three-cone drill	Vertical jump	Broad jump	Bench press
6 ft 1 3/8 in (1.86 m)	206 lb (93 kg)	32 5/8 in (0.83 m)	8 1/2 in (0.22 m)	6 ft 3 3/4 in (1.92 m)	4.60 s	1.54 s	2.68 s	4.41 s	7.14 s	34.5 in (0.88 m)	10 ft 5 in (3.18 m)	24 reps
All values from NFL Combine/Pro Day

=== Washington Football Team / Commanders ===
The Washington Football Team selected Curl in the seventh round (216th overall) of the 2020 NFL draft. Curl was the 17th safety drafted in 2020.

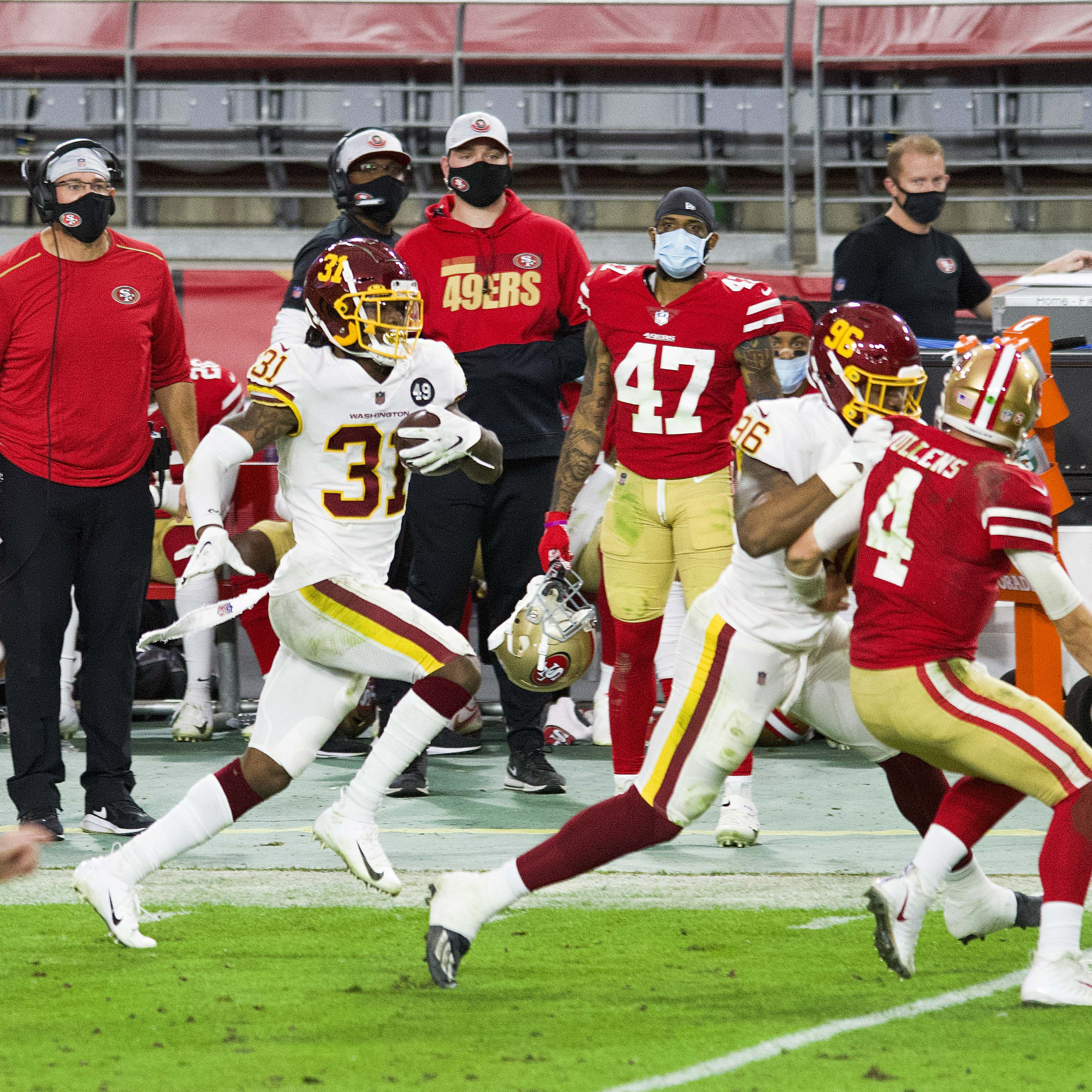
Curl returning an interception for a touchdown against the San Francisco 49ers in 2020.

==== 2020 ====
On July 24, 2020, the Washington Commanders signed Curl to a four–year, $3.40 million contract that includes a signing bonus of $113,328.

Throughout training camp, Curl competed for a roster spot as a backup safety against Jeremy Reaves, Cole Luke, and Troy Apke. Head coach Ron Rivera named Curl a backup safety to begin the season, behind starting duo Troy Apke and Landon Collins.

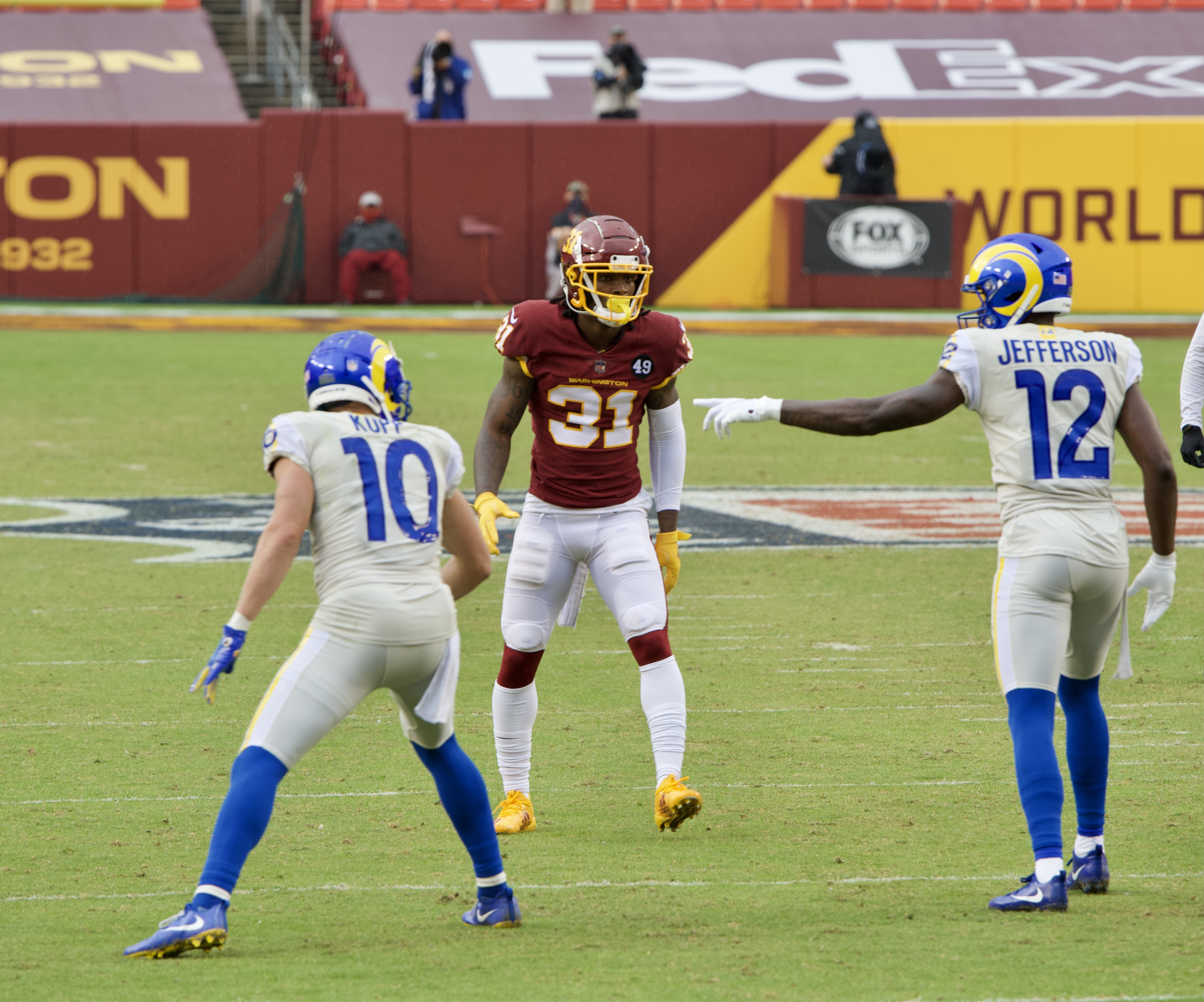
Curl (middle) lining up for a play against the Los Angeles Rams in 2020.

On September 13, 2020, Curl made his professional regular season debut and recorded three combined tackles (two solo) during a 27–17 victory against the Philadelphia Eagles. On October 4, 2020, he earned the first start of his career as a nickelback and made three combined tackles (one solo) in a 17–31 loss to the Baltimore Ravens. On October 27, 2020, Washington's head coach Ron Riveira named Curl the starting strong safety after Landon Collins tore his achilles and was placed on injured reserve. injury in Week 8. The following week, Curl led the team and set a season-high 11 combined tackles (six solo) and also made his first career sack on Daniel Jones during a 20–23 loss to the New York Giants. On December 13, 2020, Curl made seven solo tackles, a season-high two pass deflections, and returned his first career interception for his first touchdown as Washington defeated the San Francisco 49ers 23–15. His pick-six occurred after he intercepted a pass by Nick Mullens to fullback Kyle Juszczyk and returned it 76–yards for a touchdown. He finished the season with 3 interceptions, 88 combined tackles (66 solo), two quarterback sacks, four pass deflections, three interceptions, and a touchdown in 16 games and 11 starts. He earned an overall grade of 68.0 from Pro Football Focus in 2020.

The Washington Football Team finished the 2020 NFL season first in the NFC East with a 7–9 record. On January 9, 2021, he started in his first career postseason appearance and made seven combined tackles (three solo) during a 23–31 loss against the Tampa Bay Buccaneers in the NFC Wildcard Game.

==== 2021 ====
He entered training camp slated as the de facto starting free safety after an impressive performance as a rookie and earned the role ahead of Deshazor Everett, Landon Collins, Darrick Forrest, Jeremy Reaves, and Bobby McCain. Head coach Ron Riveira named Curl and Landon Collins as the starting safeties to begin the regular season.

On December 16, 2021, Curl was placed on the team's COVID-19/reserve list and was forced to miss the Week 15 loss at the Philadelphia Eagles. On December 24, 2021, the Washington Football Team activated Curl from reserve to re-join the active roster. On January 2, 2022, Kurl recorded a season-high ten combined tackles (six solo) during a 16-20 loss to the Philadelphia Eagles. He completed the 2021 NFL season with a total of 99 combined tackles (62 solo), five pass deflections, and one sack in 16 games and 11 starts.

==== 2022 ====
Head coach Ron Riveira named Curl the starting strong safety to begin the season, along with free safety Bobby McCain. After receiving thumb surgery on his right hand, Curl missed Weeks 1 and 2 of the 2022 season. In Week 9, he collected a season-high 11 combined tackles (eight solo) during a 17–20 loss against the Minnesota Vikings. On December 4, 2022, Curl ties his season-high of 11 combined tackles (eight solo) during a 20–20 tie at the New York Giants. He was sidelined for the last three games (Weeks 16–18) after injuring his ankle. He finished the 2022 NFL season with 83 combined tackles (58 solo) and one sack in 12 games and 12 starts. He received an overall grade of 82.9 from Pro Football Focus in 2023, which ranked second amongst all safeties.

==== 2023 ====
Throughout training camp, Curl competed to be the starting safety against Darrick Forrest and Quan Martin. Head coach Ron Rivera named Curl and Derrick Forrest the starting safeties to begin the season. In Week 4, he collected a season-high 12 combined tackles (nine solo) and one sack during a 31–34 loss at the Philadelphia Eagles. On October 15, 2023, Curl made 11 combined tackles (eight solo) and a season-high two pass deflections during a 24–16 win at the Atlanta Falcons. He was inactive for the Commanders' Week 18 loss to the Dallas Cowboys after injuring his quadriceps. He finished the 2023 NFL season with a career-high 115 combined tackles (74 solo), five pass deflections, and one sack in 16 games and 16 starts. He received an overall grade of 66.6 from Pro Football Focus in 2023, which ranked 50th amongst all safeties.

=== Los Angeles Rams ===
==== 2024 ====
On March 15, 2024, the Los Angeles Rams signed Curl to a two–year, $9 million contract that includes $6 million guaranteed upon signing. He entered training camp slated as the de facto starting strong safety. Head coach Sean McVay named Curl the starting strong safety to begin the season, alongside free safety John Johnson III. On October 20, 2024, Curl made seven solo tackles and recovered a fumble by Gardner Minshew that was caused during a sack by Cobie Durant and returned it 33–yards for a touchdown as the Rams defeated the Las Vegas Raiders 15–20. In Week 17, Curl collected a season-high ten combined tackles (five solo) during a 13–9 win against the Arizona Cardinals. He was inactive as a healthy scratch for a Week 18 loss to the Seattle Seahawks as head coach Sean McVay chose to rest as many starters as possible for the playoffs. He finished with 79 combined tackles (49 solo), nine pass deflections, two forced fumbles, one fumble recovery, one sack, and one touchdown in 16 games and 16 starts. He received an overall grade of 78.0 from Pro Football Focus in 2024, which ranked 17th among all safeties. His coverage grade of 83.7 from PFF ranked 19th among all safeties.

==== 2025 ====
Curl started all 17 games during the regular season and set career highs in total (122) and solo tackles (79) while adding two interceptions and five pass deflections. In the Rams’ 20-17 victory in the Divisional Round matchup against the Chicago Bears, Curl intercepted quarterback Caleb Williams to set up the game-winning drive in overtime.

==== 2026 ====
On March 6, 2026, the Los Angeles Rams re-signed Curl to a three—year, $36 million contract extension that includes $24 million guaranteed and an initial signing bonus of $5 million. The contract includes incentives that could have a maximum value of $39 million.

== NFL career statistics ==
Legend
**Bold**	Career high

=== Regular season ===
Year	Team	Games		Tackles					Fumbles				Interceptions					
Year	Team	GP	GS	Comb	Solo	Ast	Sack	TFL	FF	FR	Yds	TD	Int	Yds	Avg	Lng	TD	PD
2020	WAS	16	11	88	63	25	**2.0**	4	0	0	0	0	**3**	**88**	**29.3**	**76**	**1**	4
2021	WAS	16	14	99	62	37	1.0	2	0	**1**	0	0	0	0	0.0	0	0	5
2022	WAS	12	12	83	58	25	1.0	**6**	0	0	0	0	0	0	0.0	0	0	0
2023	WAS	16	16	115	74	41	1.0	3	1	**1**	0	0	0	0	0.0	0	0	5
2024	LAR	16	16	79	49	30	1.0	1	**2**	**1**	**33**	**1**	0	0	0.0	0	0	**9**
2025	LAR	17	17	**122**	**79**	**43**	**2.0**	2	1	0	0	0	2	0	0.0	0	0	5
Career		93	86	586	385	201	8.0	18	4	3	33	1	5	88	17.6	76	1	28

=== Postseason ===
Year	Team	Games		Tackles					Fumbles				Interceptions					
Year	Team	GP	GS	Comb	Solo	Ast	Sack	TFL	FF	FR	Yds	TD	Int	Yds	Avg	Lng	TD	PD
2020	WAS	1	1	7	4	3	0.0	0	0	0	0	0	0	0	0.0	0	0	0
2024	LAR	2	2	8	5	3	0.0	**1**	0	0	0	0	0	0	0.0	0	0	0
2025	LAR	3	3	**27**	**15**	**12**	0.0	0	0	0	0	**1**	1	0	0.0	0	0	**2**
Career		6	6	42	24	18	0.0	1	0	0	0	1	0	0	0.0	0	0	2
