= Ron Widby =

American football and basketball player (1945–2020)

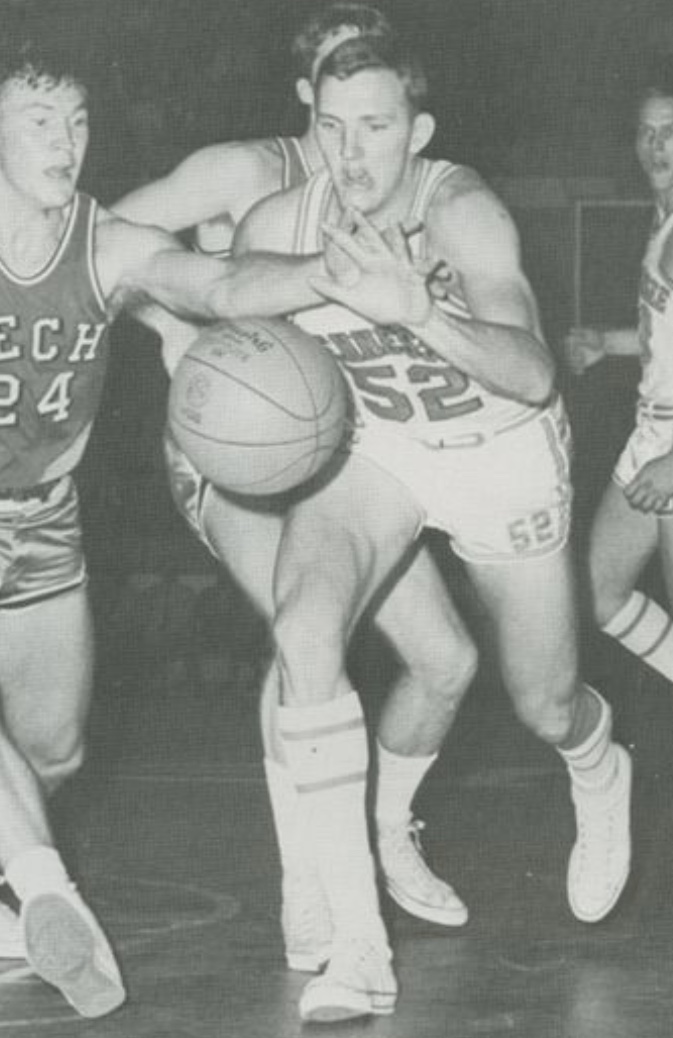

No. 12, 10, 20
- Position: Punter

Personal information
- Born: March 9, 1945; Knoxville, Tennessee, U.S.
- Died: December 22, 2020 (aged 75); Allen, Texas, U.S.
- Listed height: 6 ft 4 in (1.93 m)
- Listed weight: 210 lb (95 kg)

Career information
- High school: Fulton (Knoxville, Tennessee)
- College: Tennessee
- NFL draft: 1967: 4th round, 81st overall pick

Career history
- New Orleans Saints (1967)*; New Orleans Buccaneers (ABA) (1967); Dallas Cowboys (1967–1971); → Oklahoma City Plainsmen (1967); Green Bay Packers (1972–1973)
- * Offseason or practice squad member only

Awards and highlights
- Super Bowl champion (VI); Pro Bowl (1971); Basketball second-team All-American – AP (1967); SEC Basketball Player of the Year (1967); 2× Basketball All-SEC (1966, 1967)

Career NFL statistics
- Punts: 368
- Punting yards: 15,448
- Longest punt: 84
- Stats at Pro Football Reference

George Ronald Widby (March 9, 1945 – December 23, 2020) was an American professional football player who was a punter in the National Football League (NFL) for the Dallas Cowboys and Green Bay Packers. He also was a member of the New Orleans Buccaneers of the American Basketball Association (ABA). He played college football and basketball for the Tennessee Volunteers, earning conference player of the year honors in basketball in the Southeastern Conference (SEC) in 1967.

== Early life ==
Widby attended Fulton High School, where he was a multi-sport athlete. He played quarterback in football. From his childhood in Knoxville, Widby showed tremendous athletic promise. One retired Knoxville sportswriter, Marvin West, recalled for a 2011 story on Widby that "he was good for his age. Every step of the way in his career, he was smooth for his age." Widby himself would recall, "I grew up with the idea I was going to win a scholarship to the University of Tennessee."

He did just that, signing with Tennessee after starring as a quarterback, safety, and punter at Fulton High School in Knoxville. However, near the end of his senior football season at Fulton, he broke his arm and shoulder. Widby recovered well enough to have a strong senior basketball season.

== College career ==
After arriving at his hometown university, Widby initially decided to concentrate on basketball due to his high school injury. Even though he did not attend spring or fall practice with the freshman football team—at the time, freshmen were not allowed to play NCAA varsity sports—the football team kept him on scholarship in hopes he would change his mind.

As it turned out, the football coaching staff went to head basketball coach Ray Mears, telling him they needed a punter. Mears had no problem with Widby playing that position, and as Widby himself recalled in 2011, "I always enjoyed punting a football." He also played on the freshman team in another of his high school sports, baseball, hitting nearly .400.

As a sophomore (1964–65), he had won starting positions in both football and basketball. He averaged 41.1 yards on 74 punts. He also hit nearly .300 in what would be his only varsity baseball season, but felt bored by that sport.

As a junior, he averaged 42.8 yards on 20 punts. He also met Tennessee's golf coach, who upon finding out that Widby had also been on Fulton's varsity golf team, invited him to try out for the team. Widby would go on to earn a letter in golf. He had the unusual situation of having his football team playing in the 1965 Bluebonnet Bowl and at the same time the basketball squad was participating in the Gulf South Classic, so he was ferried by airplane back and forth between Shrevport and Houston as his playing schedule required.

Sportswriter Ron Higgins would say in 2011, "Few athletes in SEC history enjoyed a better senior year in 1966–67 than Ron in both football and basketball." As a senior in football, he led the nation in punting average at 43.8 yards on 48 punts, while in basketball, he averaged 22.1 points and 8.7 rebounds while leading the Volunteers to a conference title. He was named a second-team All-American in basketball, and was also the SEC's basketball Player of the Year.

He scored 50 points in his last regular season game against Louisiana State University, finishing his college career with 576 points. He also thought about continuing with golf, but decided against it because it interfered with NFL contract negotiations. Similarly to the previous year, he had to take part in a basketball tournament and then rush to play in the 1966 Gator Bowl football game on the same day.

In 1997, he was inducted into the Tennessee Sports Hall of Fame. In 2016, he was inducted into the University of Tennessee Athletics Hall of Fame.

== Professional career ==
=== New Orleans Saints ===
Widby was selected in three professional drafts in two sports. The New Orleans Saints selected him in the fourth round (81st overall) of the 1967 NFL/AFL draft. In the same year, he was chosen by the New Orleans Buccaneers in the ABA Draft and was selected in the 12th round of the 1967 NBA draft by the Chicago Bulls. Although basketball was his favorite sport, he signed with the Saints for a $50,000 bonus, who released him in August when he couldn't beat rookie undrafted free agent Tom McNeill.

=== New Orleans Buccaneers (ABA) ===
After failing to make the Saints' inaugural season roster, he signed with the New Orleans Buccaneers of the ABA, playing for that team during the 1967–68 American Basketball Association season.

=== Dallas Cowboys ===
On September 13, 1967, he was signed by the Dallas Cowboys after his release from the Saints. He was assigned to the Oklahoma City Plainsmen of the Continental Football League before returning to the team's taxi squad in December.

In 1968, he became the starting punter and finished tied for fifth in the league with a 40.9-yard average. He had a franchise and an NFL record, with an 84-yard punt against his former team the Saints (also had a 56-yard punt in the same game) and set a second club mark by averaging 53.4 yards per punt.

In 1969, he voluntarily gave his #12 jersey to future hall of famer Roger Staubach, who had resigned his naval commission to join the Cowboys. He finished second in the league with a 43.3-yard average.

In 1970, he was second in the NFC with a 41.3-yard average. He also set a Super Bowl record with nine punt attempts, while playing against the Baltimore Colts in Super Bowl V.

In 1971, he was third in the NFC with a 41.6-yard average. He played in Super Bowl VI and became the second Cowboys punter to be named to the Pro Bowl (Sam Baker was the first).

On September 5, 1972, to make room for rookie punter Marv Bateman who could also place kick if needed, he was traded to the Green Bay Packers along with cornerback Ike Thomas, in exchange for a 1973 second round draft choice (#46-Golden Richards) .

=== Green Bay Packers ===
Widby played two seasons for the Packers before suffering a ruptured spinal disc in a freak accident, that would cost him the last two games of 1973, all of the 1974 season, ending his career and leading to his release on July 18, 1975. He averaged 41.8 yards per punt in 1972 and 43.1 yards in 1973.

== Personal life ==
He later became a club pro at a country club in Texas, and once he turned 50, he entered the qualifying school for the Senior PGA Tour twice, just missing out on his tour card on his second attempt. He retired and lived in Allen, Texas. Widby died on December 23, 2020, at the age of 75.
