= North Knox Career and Technical Education Center =

Location
- 7411 Ledgerwood Road; Halls Crossroads, Tennessee; United States
- Coordinates: 36.089°N 83.925°W

Information
- Type: Public
- School district: Knox County
- Principal: Mark Duff
- Campus Director: Mike Toth
- Grades: 9-12
- Affiliation: Knox County Schools
- Website: http://nkctec.knoxschools.org/

The North Knox Career and Technical Education Center is a public school located in Halls Crossroads, Tennessee. The school shares a campus with Halls High School.

The school's director is H.B. Jenkins, assistant principal for Halls High School.
