= Darby Conley =

American cartoonist

Darby Conley is an American cartoonist best known for the newspaper comic strip Get Fuzzy.

== Biography ==
Conley was born in Concord, Massachusetts, in 1970, and grew up in Knoxville, Tennessee.

While in high school in 1986, he won a student cartooning competition. During his senior year at Doyle High School (now South-Doyle High School) in Knoxville, Conley was voted 'Most Talented' by his graduating class. Conley was a member of Amherst College's a cappella group, the Zumbyes.

Conley cited the Tintin books as the strongest visual inspiration for his work.

== Get Fuzzy ==
Comics syndicate United Media agreed in 1999 to publish Conley's new strip Get Fuzzy about an anthropomorphic cat, Bucky, and dog, Satchel, living with their single young-male owner, Rob Wilco, which premiered on September 6, 1999. The idea for Bucky's character came from a friend's Siamese cat.

Without explanation, Conley stopped drawing daily Get Fuzzy strips in 2013. For some time after he drew Sunday strips only, though the last known new Sunday installment was on February 3, 2019. Repeats of the strip are still offered to newspapers today.

=== Awards ===
- 2002, National Cartoonists Society Award for Newspaper Comic Strip.

== Controversies ==
On October 30, 2003, the city of Pittsburgh served as the punch line of a strip about tourism destinations based on smells. Offended residents of the area deluged the author with negative feedback that included death threats.

A May 13, 2005, strip portrayed Boston-area sports reporter Bob Lobel as a drunk, prompting Lobel to file libel lawsuits against Conley and his syndicate. The parties announced in November 2005 that they had reached a settlement, although terms of the settlement were not disclosed. Due to this controversy, that particular strip was removed from the collection Take Our Cat, Please! and the treasury The Potpourrific Great Big Grab Bag of Get Fuzzy.
