= Muskogee Public Schools =

School district in Oklahoma, United States

Coordinates: 35.746136°N 95.371014°W

Address
- 202 West Broadway Muskogee, Oklahoma, 74403; United States

District information
- Type: Public, co-educational
- Superintendent: Dr. Jarod Mendenhall
- School board: Muskogee Board of Education

Students and staff
- District mascot: Roughers
- Colors: Green and white

Other information
- Website: www.muskogeeps.org

The Muskogee Public School district (officially known as Muskogee Independent School District No. 20) is a public school district headquartered in Muskogee, Oklahoma. It covers most of Muskogee. The district's mascot is the Rougher, an anthropomorphic bulldog. The district is governed by a five-member Muskogee Board of Education, with members being elected to serve staggered five year terms. The Board in turn appoints a Superintendent to be the chief administrative officer of the district.

== History ==
John Tom Staton was the superintendent until 1973, when four of five people on the board of trustees voted to remove him from his position. One African-American board member, Thelma Chandler, voted against his removal.

== Schools ==
There is one early childhood center, one virtual school, six elementary schools, and four secondary schools in the Muskogee Public School District.

Secondary:

- Muskogee High School
- Rougher Alternative Academy, an alternative school
- Muskogee 8th and 9th Grade Academy at Alice Robertson
- Muskogee 6th and 7th Grade Academy at Ben Franklin

Elementary:

- NewTech @ Cherokee Elementary
- Creek Elementary
- Pershing Elementary
- Sadler Arts Academy, housed in the NRHP-listed Manual Training High School for Negroes
- Tony Goetz Elementary
- Irving Elementary

Early Childhood Centers:

- Muskogee Early Childhood Center

Virtual School:

- Roughers Innovations Academy (3rd-12th)
