= Prince McJunkins =

American football player (1960–2021)

No. 4
- Position: Quarterback

Personal information
- Born: December 16, 1960; Muskogee, Oklahoma, U.S.
- Died: February 9, 2021 (aged 60); Tulsa, Oklahoma, U.S.
- Listed height: 6 ft 1 in (1.85 m)
- Listed weight: 170 lb (77 kg)

Career information
- High school: Muskogee
- College: Wichita State (1979–1982)
- NFL draft: 1983: undrafted

Career history
- Ottawa Rough Riders (1983–1984)

Awards and highlights
- 2× MVC Offensive Player of the Year (1981–1982); Wichita State No. 1 retired

Prince Eddie McJunkins III (December 16, 1960 – February 9, 2021) was an American professional football quarterback who played two seasons with the Ottawa Rough Riders of the Canadian Football League (CFL). He played college football at Wichita State University, where he was the first player in NCAA history to record career totals of at least 2,000 rushing yards and 4,000 passing yards. His jersey number was retired by Wichita State. McJunkins then played for the Rough Riders from 1983 to 1984, and ran for 119 yards in the first quarter of his debut CFL start. He was later inducted into several hall of fames, and had an intersection named after him.

== Early life ==
Prince Eddie McJunkins III was born on December 16, 1960, in Muskogee, Oklahoma. He attended Muskogee High School and graduated in 1979. He was inducted into the Muskogee Athletic Hall of Fame in 2011.

== College career ==
McJunkins played college football for the Wichita State Shockers of Wichita State University from 1979 to 1982. He completed 45 of 99 passes (45.5%) for 584 yards, three touchdowns, and four interceptions while also rushing for 290 yards and four touchdowns during the 1979 season, earning Missouri Valley Conference (MVC) Newcomer of the Year honors. In 1980, McJunkins totaled 82 completions on 157 passing attempts (52.2%) for 1,015 yards, five touchdowns, 13 interceptions, 393 rushing yards, and three rushing touchdowns. As a junior in 1981, he completed 97 of 210 passes (46.2%) for 1,725 yards, eight touchdowns, and 12 interceptions while rushing for 765 yards and ten touchdowns, garnering MVC Offensive Player of the Year recognition. His passing yards and rushing touchdowns were the most in the MVC that year. McJunkins also led the MVC in yards per pass attempt with 8.2, passing yards per game with 156.8, and passer rating with 116.3. As a senior in 1982, he completed 80 of 147 passes (54.4%) for 1,220 yards, 11 touchdowns, and nine interceptions while rushing for 599 yards and ten touchdowns, earning MVC Offensive Player of the Year honors for the second straight season. Wichita State finished the 1982 season 8–3, their best record in 21 years. McJunkins was the first player in NCAA history to record career totals of at least 2,000 rushing yards and 4,000 passing yards. He also set the school and MVC total offense record with 6,591 yards. He graduated with a bachelor of science in criminal justice. His jersey No. 1 was retired after the 1982 season, joining Linwood Sexton as the only Shockers football players to have their numbers retired (Wichita State's football program was discontinued in 1986). McJunkins was inducted into Wichita State's athletics hall of fame in 1989.

== Professional career ==
In January 1983, McJunkins was selected by the Denver Gold of the United States Football League (USFL) in the 13th round, with the 153rd overall pick, of the 1983 USFL draft. However, he instead signed with the Ottawa Rough Riders of the Canadian Football League (CFL). On October 29, 1983, he made his first CFL start and ran for 119 yards in the first quarter. Overall in 1983, he dressed in seven games for the Rough Riders, completing 19 of 46 passes (41.3%) for 234 yards, one touchdown, and two interceptions while also rushing 37 times for 328 yards and losing two fumbles. McJunkins dressed in seven games again in 1984, recording 16 completions on 33 attempts (48.5%) for 224 yards, two touchdowns, and four interceptions, and 19 carries for 91 yards. On August 31, 1984, it was reported that he had been released by Ottawa.

== Personal life ==
McJunkins worked for the Department of Corrections, the Veterans Administration, and for the American government and military as an overseas contractor. He was inducted into the Wichita, Kansas Sports Hall of Fame in 2008. His son Prince McJunkins played college football at Georgia Southern and Northeastern State.

McJunkins died from complications of COVID-19 on February 9, 2021, in Tulsa, Oklahoma. In 2024, the City of Muskogee announced that the intersection of North Junction and Denison Street was now named Prince McJunkins III Avenue.
