= Halls High School (Knox County, Tennessee) =

Coordinates: 36.0886°N 83.9259°W

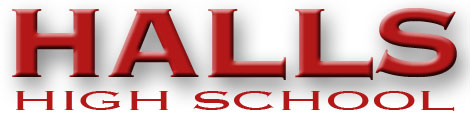

Location
- 4321 East Emory Road; Halls Crossroads, Tennessee; United States

Information
- Type: Public
- Motto: Dedicated to Excellence
- Established: 1916
- School district: Knox County Schools
- Principal: Spencer Long, 2019
- Teaching staff: 78.83 (FTE)
- Grades: 9–12
- Enrollment: 1,265 (2022–23)
- Student to teacher ratio: 16.05
- Campus: 30 acres
- Colors: Red and White
- Athletics: Athletic Director: Rebecca Smith
- Mascot: Red Devils
- Nickname: The Red Devils
- National ranking: 7,269
- Yearbook: The Annual
- Website: http://hallshs.knoxschools.org/
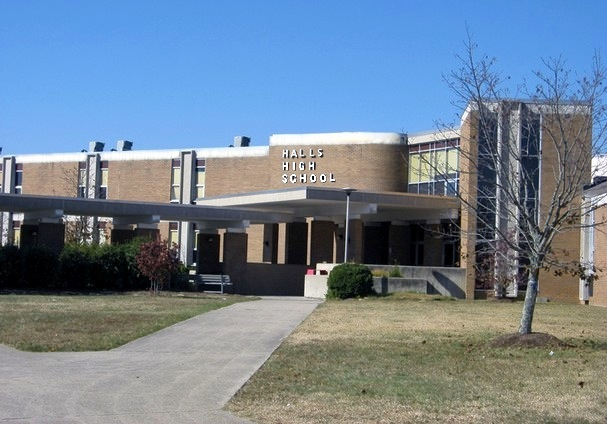

Halls High School is a high school in the Halls Crossroads suburb of Knoxville, Tennessee, operated by Knox County Schools. Founded in 1916, the school was one of the first in the area. It is named for Pulaski Hall, a prominent citizen and owner of one of the first businesses in the town.

The school includes the North Knox Career and Technical Education Center.

The principal of Halls High is Spencer Long, an alumnus of the school who succeeded Mark Duff following his retirement. Duff was a longtime history teacher at Halls High before entering administration in Knox County Schools.

== Academics ==
Halls High School offers an extensive academic array from technical studies to college preparatory programs. The school shares its campus with the North Knox Career and Technical Education Center, a school that provides intense, hands-on studies in a variety of fields. The school also sponsors many clubs and academic societies including:

- Art Appreciation Club
- Theatre
- Ecology Club
- Family, Career and Community Leaders of America
- Fellowship of Christian Athletes
- French Club
- Future Business Leaders of America-Phi Beta Lambda
- Future Farmers of America
- Health Occupations Students of America
- Contemporary Debate Club
- Key Club
- Mu Alpha Theta-Math Honor Society
- National Honor Society
- SkillsUSA
- Student Government Association
- Technology Student Association
- Teens for Christ
- Annual Staff
- Madrigals
- Student Advisory Council
- Masquerade Players
- Marching Red Devil Band

== Athletics ==
The Red Devils football team won the AAA state championship in 1986, and finished runner-up behind Pearl Cohn in 1996. The men's golf team won the Tennessee state championship in 1986, 2016, and 2017. In 2010, the school hosted the 1st Annual Halls High School Golf Tournament. The Red Devils Baseball team was ranked 15th in the nation in the 2010 season by ESPN RISE. In 2013, 2014, 2015, 2017, 2018, 2019, and 2025, the Halls wrestling team won 1st in the dual district tournament, 1st in dual regions, and 1st in individual regions. The team has placed Top 10 in the individual and dual state for the 2014, 2015, 2016, 2017, and 2018 season. They have placed two individuals in 2014, 2015, and 2018; placed three in 2016, and 2018; and four in 2017. On February 4, 2023, Halls High School wrestling team won the state championship.

== Notable alumni ==
- Chad Finchum, racing driver
- Hadley Gamble, CNBC presenter
- Wes Kitts, Olympic weightlifter
