= South-Doyle High School =

South-Doyle high School

Location
- 2020 Tipton Station Road; Knoxville, TN 37920; United States; 35°53′15″N 83°53′06″W

Information
- Type: Public
- Motto: "Pursue A Culture of Excellence for All Students!"
- Opened: 1991
- School district: Knox County Schools
- Superintendent: Jon Rysewyk
- Principal: Brad Carr
- Faculty: 69.88 (on an FTE basis)
- Grades: 9 to 12
- Gender: Coed
- Enrollment: 992 (2022–23)
- Student to teacher ratio: 14.20
- Campus size: Main Campus (Sophomore-Senior) Young Campus (Freshman Academy)
- Campus type: suburban
- Colors: Navy and Red
- Mascot: Cherokees ('Kees)
- Newspaper: The Phoenix (discontinued)
- Feeder schools: South-Doyle Middle School
- Website: School website

South-Doyle High School is a Southern Association of Colleges and Schools' accredited high school in unincorporated Knox County, Tennessee, near Knoxville, operated by the Knox County Schools school district.

The official feeder school is South-Doyle Middle School which gains students from Bonny Kate Elementary, Dogwood Elementary, Gap Creek Elementary, Mooreland Heights Elementary, Mount Olive Elementary, New Hopewell Elementary, and South Knoxville Elementary School. It serves areas south of the Tennessee River.

Brad Carr is the current head principal. He began this position during the 2022-2023 school year.

== History ==
South-Doyle High School shares a history with several former schools. Young High School was established in 1913, followed by South High School in 1952 and Doyle High School in 1967. In 1976, Young and South were merged to form South-Young High School. In 1991, Doyle and South-Young were merged, creating the current South-Doyle High School. The campus includes both the former Doyle High campus (now the main campus area) and the campus for the former Doyle Middle school (now the Young campus).

== Academics ==
South-Doyle offers advanced placement (AP), college preparatory, honors, traditional, and vocational courses. The four core subjects of Math (Algebra I & II, Geometry, Pre-Calculus, Calculus, and Statistics offered), Science (Biology, Chemistry, and Physics offered), English (sections I-IV), and Social Studies (World Geography/History, US History, Economics, and US Government offered). For foreign language the school offers Spanish. Another option students are presented with comes in the form of Fine Arts: visual arts, chorus, or band. The school is also keen on providing trade/industry classes. They also offer classes dealing with business technology, family/consumer science, health science, marketing, JROTC, human services, and hospitality/tourism. The school utilizes a college and career counselor that assists students with applying for colleges, jobs, and scholarships. The school also offers Dual Enrollment classes that coordinate alongside local community colleges (such as Pellissippi State Community College in order to help students immerse themselves in college curriculum). The school also requires physical education and health & wellness (which is a required freshman class).

=== Race to the Top ===
The Knox County Schools announced in October 2010 that the TAP program (formerly the Teacher Advancement Program) was to be expanded to 13 schools, including South-Doyle High School. The expansion was funded by a five-year $26.5 million federal grant awarded to the Teacher Incentive Fund. Additional funding was provided by a Knox County Schools Race to the Top grant and the Great Schools Partnership. South-Doyle High School implemented the TAP program in the 2011-2012 school year. TAP is a comprehensive school reform and instructional improvement system that provides powerful opportunities for career advancement, professional growth, instructionally-focused accountability, and incentive compensation for educators. The TAP program is measured by the value-added growth of students, teacher classroom evaluations and fidelity to the core elements of the TAP system: Instructionally-focused accountability, ongoing applied professional growth, multiple career paths and performance-based compensation.

== Student life ==
=== Clubs and Organizations ===
Student groups and clubs: Army JROTC Battalion, Anime Club, Art Club, Band, Future Business Leaders of America (FBLA), DECA, Fellowship of Christian Athletes (FCA), FCCLA (Family, Career, and Community Leaders of America), French Club, German Club, Guitar Hero/Rock Band, HOSA (Health Occupation Students of America), Key Club, Latin Club, Prom Committee, National Art Honor Society (NAHS), National Honors Society (NHS), Singers, South-Doyle Community Service Council, Spanish Club, Y-Teens, Robotics, and Yearbook.

=== Chorus ===
The Chorus performs a spring play/musical every year, and in the Fall of 2014, the Honors Chorus sang alongside British-American rock band, Foreigner (band) at the Tennessee Theatre in downtown Knoxville.

== School Diversity ==
Sign at the entrance of the main building to South-Doyle High School in 2010

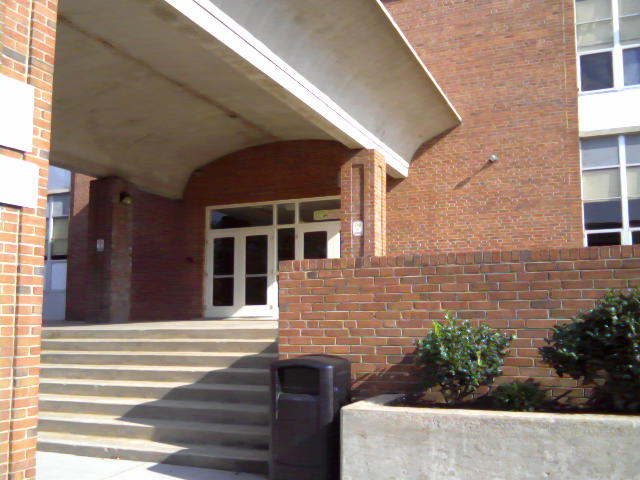
Steps to the main entrance of South-Doyle High School in Knoxville in 2010.

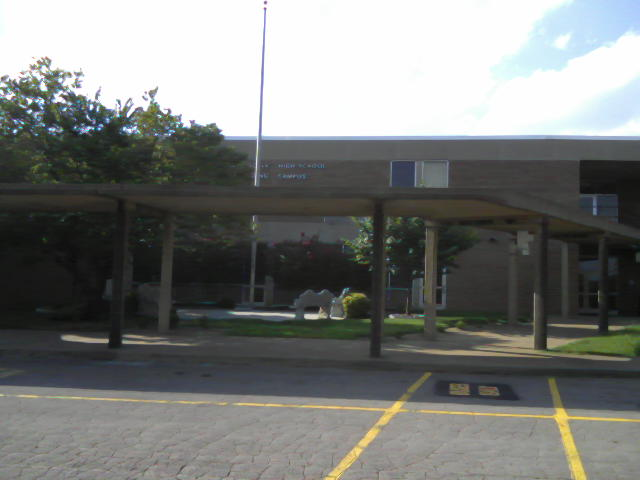
2010 picture of the Young Campus of South Doyle High School in Knoxville. From 1972 to 1991, this was known as Doyle Middle School.

These details on the school's student body are based on data reported to the US Education Department.

Enrollment	2022-2023
Total Enrollment	991
9th grade	239 Students
10th grade	277 Students
11th grade	257 Students
12th grade	218 Students

=== Ethnicity/Race ===
Total Minority Enrollment	2022-2023
Asian Enrollment	>5%
Black Enrollment	16.4%
Hawaiian Native/Pacific Islander Enrollment	0%
Hispanic Enrollment	6.3%
White Enrollment	76.2%

=== Gender ===
Gender Enrollment	2011-2012
Male Enrollment	52%
Female Enrollment	48%

== Sports ==
The school offers cheerleading, cross-country, flag football, football, golf, girls soccer, and volleyball in the fall. In the winter, the school offers both boys and girls basketball as well as wrestling. In the spring, the school offers baseball, soccer, softball, tennis, and track & field.

=== Football ===
The South-Doyle Cherokees football team participates in 3A TSSAA Competition. On October 30, 2014, the Cherokees won the district championship. After a winless 2015 campaign, the Cherokees went 5-5 in the 2016 regular season. Despite the average record, the Cherokees made the 2016 playoffs. After winning their first three games in the playoffs, the Cherokees qualified for their first ever semi-finals appearance.

=== Baseball ===
In 2007, the South-Doyle Cherokees baseball team went to the state tournament in Murfreesboro, TN. but lost the championship game. Several of the seniors were drafted including former Middle Tennessee State University outfielder and current Boston Red Sox, Bryce Brentz.

=== Rugby ===
The South-Doyle Cherokees Rugby Team has won four state championships in 7s and one in 15s. The Cherokees enter the 2016 15s season ranked #23 in the Single School category. The rugby program is currently inactive.

=== Soccer ===
The boys soccer team won a district title in 2019 and a region title in 2018. The girls team won a district title in 2016. In 2018, the boys soccer team advanced to the state tournament for the first time in school history. During the 2018 tournament run the Cherokees beat Catholic and Sevier County in penalty kicks before eventually losing to Loudon 4-1 in the state quarter-finals.

== Notable alumni ==
- Chad Bell (2007) - pitcher for the Detroit Tigers
- Bryce Brentz (2007) - outfielder for the Boston Red Sox
- Darby Conley (1988 - Doyle) - Get Fuzzy cartoonist
- Johnny Knoxville (1989 - South-Young) - actor, stunt performer, filmmaker, comedian, and co-creator of Jackass
- Shelly Moore (1997) - Miss Teen USA 1997
- Brent Smith (1996) - lead singer for the band Shinedown
