= Teens for Christ =

Christian non-profit organization

Teens for Christ (TFC) is a non-profit organization whose aim is that of "turning teenagers into fully committed followers of Jesus Christ". To reach young people, Teens for Christ hosts weekly meetings during the school year in various locations throughout local communities.

== History of TFC ==
Youth For Christ was formed in the 1940s in Allen County, Ohio. During the 1980s, the local Youth For Christ became Teens For Christ and started to hold chapter meetings in various homes throughout the area. During the 1990s, TFC accepted the mandate to "Turn Teenagers into Fully Committed Followers of Jesus Christ" under the leadership of then executive director, Buck Sutton. From the 90s, with three senior high chapters totaling 30 teens and 8 volunteer leaders, today's roster encompasses 17 chapters and over 60 volunteers. Teens for Christ hosted an annual summer Boot Camp in Canada where students are physically, mentally, and spiritually pushed through an intense week of training on Treasure Island, a privately owned, 60 acre island located in Ontario, Canada. The camp is modeled on the military idea of boot camp. The kids are divided into platoons. Each platoon has a leadership team consisting of four to five adults. In addition, the teenagers in the platoon are ranked according to how many years they have attended. First years are privates; second years are corporals. Third years are sergeants, and fourth years are staff sergeants.

In October 2008, TFC Arkansas was launched in Gentry, Arkansas, led by TFC alumni David Young. In September 2009, the Rockford, Illinois, chapter was launched. In 2009, TFC launched a ministry training school, Young Ministry Institute (YMI). The program required students to attend classes, complete online studies, ministry training, mentorship development, and work in administrative roles during the day while oversee local area chapters during the evenings. The unpaid program cost students $10,000 a year for those pursuing their bachelor's degree from Biblical Studies from Clarks Summit University or $4000 a year for those completing the YMI certificate program.

Teens for Christ continued to expand their reach by launching an annual conference for grades 8–12, Converge. In 2018, they claimed to be the largest youth conference in Ohio. Converge was closed indefinitely after the COVID-19 pandemic, according to the conference's Facebook page. In January 2020, Matt Dungan became the youth ministry director of Teens for Christ. While Buck Sutton remained involved in leadership with Teens for Christ, he started a new church in Lima, Ohio called Living Hope. In 2020, their average attendance was 100 congregants and online viewership of the church livestreams were over 1,800 views a service.

In July 2022, allegations of abuse were shared in a letter that circulated online. The letter detailed alleged sexual harassment, misconduct, and abuse at the hands of leadership and described the organization as exhibiting "cult-like" behaviors. The Allen Count Sheriff's department urged victims to share information about the organization and shared information with federal authorities as many incidents occurred allegedly across multiple states and cities. In August 2022, the board temporarily suspended the local Lima, Ohio chapters and all staff allegedly involved were placed on paid administrative leave. The investigation is still pending as more victims share complaints with local authorities.

== Teens for Christ International ==
=== TFC Kenya ===
TFC Kenya began in August 2005 with a man named Moses Omondi. He started in a handful of schools, and has since expanded to over 100 schools in areas of Kenya, including Nairobi and Kisumu. This ministry is reaching over 35,000 teens a week in over 130 chapters.

=== TFC Bangladesh ===
TFC Bangladesh was launched in June 2008. It reaches over 9,000 students through more than 150 chapters in the capital (Dhaka), the nearby Gopalganj District and Savar Upazila, Chittagong Division in the southeast of the country, Khulna Division in the southwest, and Rajshahi Division in the west.

This ministry is also part of Teens For Christ's efforts to team up with a ministry that has planted 80 churches within the past five years in this area of the world.

=== TFC Rwanda ===
TFC Rwanda was started by Aminadab Mbanzabugabo Muteteri in 2014 after his Bible college and two years of working for TFC in Kenia. It was started in Rusizi, Western Provinces, but is now also in four provinces of Ruanda with 17 full time stuff and some volunteers represented. They are reaching already over 30.000 teenagers and want to expand to reach teenagers all over the country every week in the Chapter meetings and offer discipleship programs to them.
