= Powell High School (Tennessee) =

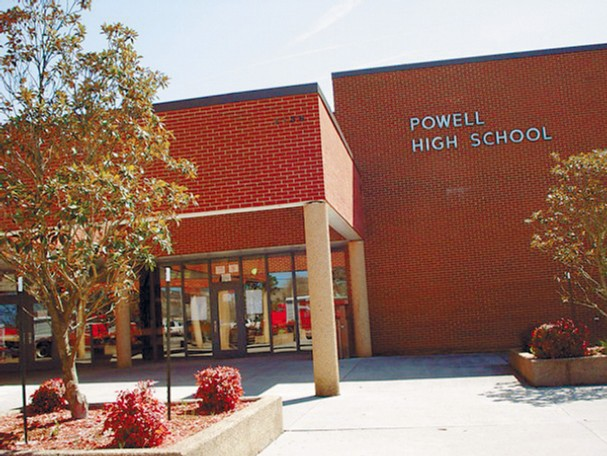

Location
- 2136 W. Emory Road; Powell, (Knox County), Tennessee 37849; United States; 36.0278862°N 84.0310651°W

Information
- School type: public
- Motto: Knoxville's Best (PHS)
- Established: 1948
- School district: Knox County Schools
- NCES School ID: 470222000755
- Principal: Chad A. Smith
- Teaching staff: 80.17 (FTE)
- Grades: 9-12
- Student to teacher ratio: 16.12
- Colors: Orange & Black
- Mascot: Panther
- Website: http://powellhs.knoxschools.org/

Powell High School is a public high school located in Powell, Tennessee, just north of Knoxville. It is part of the Knox County Schools.

The first high school in Powell was established in 1874 and was called Perkins High School. In 1916, it was renamed for Columbus Powell, the prominent person for whom the Powell Railroad Depot had been named earlier.

== Facilities ==
The school has a total of 45 classrooms along with a football stadium, field and track, softball field, baseball field, football practice field, basketball gymnasium, and the Powell High Sports Complex. Due to the recent rezoning in the Knox County School system the school is now over-capacity and has 11 teachers without classrooms.

== Athletics ==
Powell High School athletic teams are members of and are sanctioned by the Tennessee Secondary School Athletic Association.

Powell High School went to State in football in 2011 and the semi-finals in 2012.

The 2008-2009 & 2010-2011 Powell Baseball team finished in first place in the Tennessee AAA District 3.

== Student Driver Awareness Campaign ==
Beginning in 2009, the Powell High School Teen Driver Awareness Program has existed to raise awareness of the unusually high rate of teenaged automobile fatalities of current and recently graduated students of Powell High School. The program seeks to educate students to the need for seatbelt use, occasionally rewarding students caught using their seat belts on campus with gift certificates to local merchants. The Rural Metro Fire Department, Knox County Sheriffs Office and the Knoxville Volunteer Rescue Squad stage an annual demonstration of the potential effects of a fatal vehicle accident, utilizing students from the Powell High School Drama Department as mock victims. In the four years of the program, teen driver fatalities at the school are down 75%.

== Notable alumni ==
- John Bruhin, NFL player
- John Cooper, ESPN college football analyst and member of the College Football Hall of Fame
- Daryle Smith, NFL player
- Lee Smith, NFL player
- Walter Nolen, Defensive Tackle for the Arizona Cardinals
