= Fulton High School (Tennessee) =

Secondary school in Tennessee, United States

Coordinates: 35.9941°N 83.9233°W

- 2509 North Broadway, Knoxville, Tennessee; United States

Information
- Type: Secondary school
- Motto: Enter to learn, go forth to serve
- Established: 1951
- School district: Knox County Schools
- Teaching staff: 73.53 (FTE)
- Grades: 9-12
- Enrollment: 927 (2023-2024)
- Color: maroon white
- Team name: Falcons
- Website: fultonhs.knoxschools.org

Fulton High School is a secondary school in Knoxville, Tennessee, opened in 1951. It adopted the Small Learning Community model, which became the basis for the 865 Academies model adopted by Knox County Schools.

== History ==
=== Founding ===
In the 1940s the Knoxville City School System served the city's high school students in three schools - Knoxville High School, Rule High School, and Stair Technical High School. The majority of these students attended Knoxville High, a facility that was greatly in need of renovation if it was to continue housing 2,000 plus students. In lieu of this expenditure, the school board and the city council voted to build a new high school in each geographical area of the city.

Thomas N. Johnston, principal of Stair Tech, was to become the principal of the new school in the north area. After the blueprints were drawn Mr. Johnston carried them in the trunk of his car as he toured the North Knoxville neighborhood looking for the perfect building site. He finally chose land at the corner of Broadway and Woodland Avenue in the Scott Park community which the city of Knoxville then purchased from three families who jointly owned it.

On March 5, 1949 the site was the scene of the groundbreaking ceremony that launched the building of Knoxville's first comprehensive high school - a school with both an academic and vocational curriculum. The school was to be named Fulton High School in recognition of Weston Miller Fulton, a noted inventor and industrialist. Several of Mr. Fulton's original blueprints are on display at the school, as well as his oil portrait which was given to the school by the Fulton family.

Construction was begun on Fulton High School in the Spring of 1949 by Foster & Creighton Contractors, and was to be completed for the opening of school in 1951 at a cost of $1.5 million. The first students attended the new school in September 1951, most of them having previously attended Christenberry Junior High School.

=== Symbols ===
Thomas N. Johnston served as principal from 1951 to 1955, with a faculty of 49 members. The faculty also served as advisors to the first senior class as it selected the school mascot "The Falcons", proposed by Rose Butler Sanders, reasoning that falcons are birds that are "strong fliers that soar high into the sky". The school colors chosen were maroon and white. The school newspaper was named The Falcon Quill, and the first yearbook named The Falcon.

In a slogan contest in the late 1960s, the winning entry was “Enter to learn; go forth to serve”, and this has been adopted as the motto of Fulton High School.

=== Restructuring 2007 ===
During the early 2000s, it was evident that standards and rigor in education were quickly changing and the No Child Left Behind (NCLB) Act of 2001 was implemented. Due to faltering graduation rates at Fulton, as well as other deficiencies with regard to NCLB standards, educators were forced to make drastic changes. In 2007 and under the tutelage of Dr. Jon Rysewyk (the current Knox County Schools superintendent), Fulton High School was divided into a structure composed of five "small learning communities" (SLCs).

Each of the five SLCs had its own principal, guidance counselor and student advocate. Students also wore different colored shirts, which are exclusive to their SLC population (this was discontinued at the start of the 2025-26 school year).

The three upper-house SLCs were occupied by juniors and seniors. Students chose an SLC based on interests as they related to furthering their education or career: the options were School of Communications (FulCom), The School of Health Science, and The School of Skilled Professions. The two lower-house SLCs, for freshman and sophomores, were named for two species of falcons: The Merlin Wing and The Peregrine Wing.

== Structure ==
Currently, the structure of the school (effective school year 2024-25) sees the school divided into four academies in line with KCS's 865 Academies model: Freshman Academy, The Academy of Communications, the Academy of Health and Human Services, and the Academy of Public Service. Each academy has its own principal, dean, and guidance counselor.

== Notable alumni ==
- Zaevion Dobson, Arthur Ashe Courage Award recipient
- Buddy Landel, pro wrestler
- D.D. Lewis, former NFL player
- Ron Widby, former NFL player
