= Karns, Tennessee =

Karns
- CDP
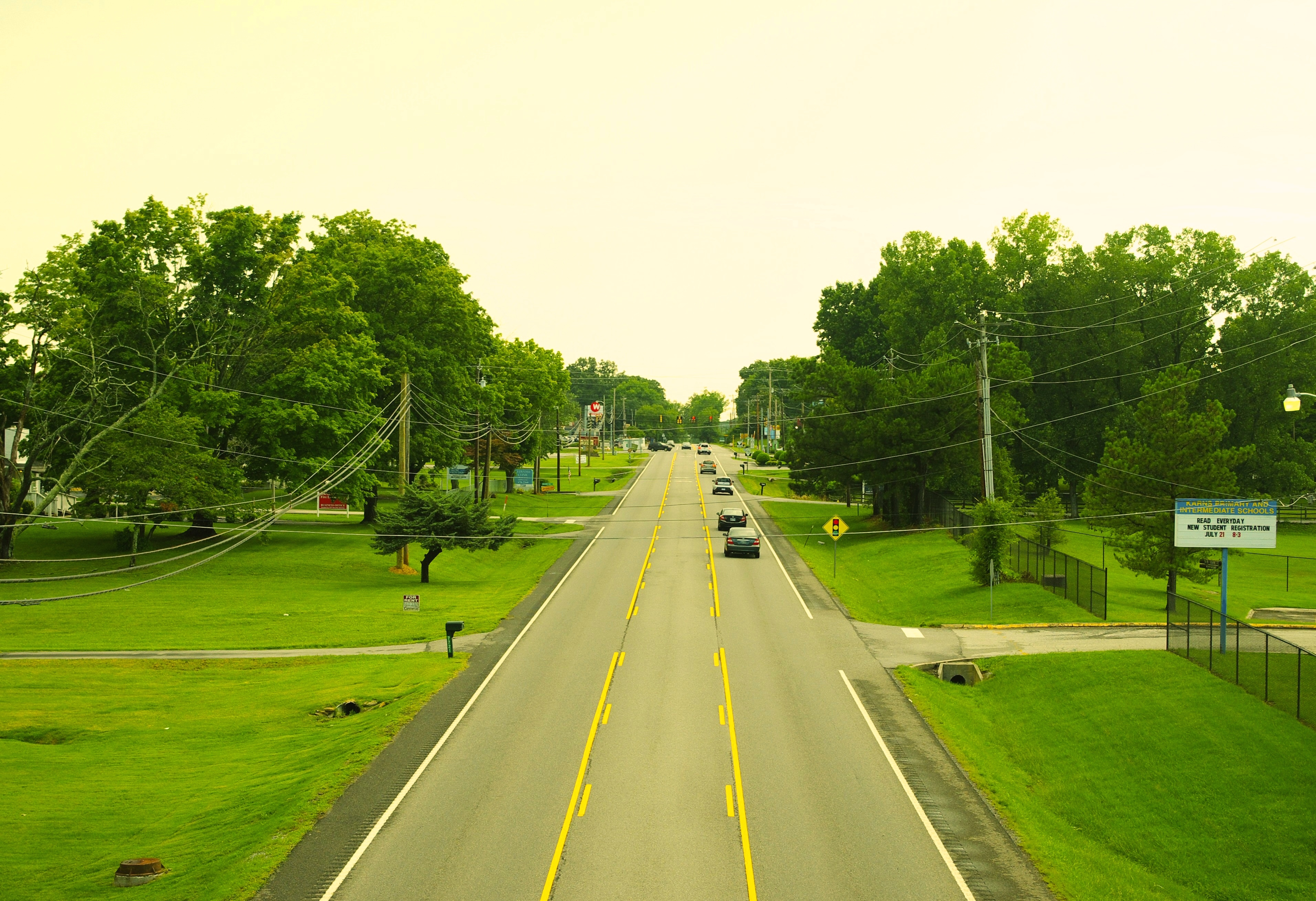
- Oak Ridge Highway (TN-62) in Karns

- Location in Tennessee and the United States Karns (the United States)
- Coordinates: 35°58′55″N 84°6′50″W
- Country: United States
- State: Tennessee
- County: Knox
- Named for: Thomas Karns

Government
  - Type: County commission
  - Mayor: Glenn Jacobs (R)
  - Commissioners: Terry Hill (R) (District 6); Kim Frazier (R) (At-Large); Larsen Jay (R) (At-Large)

Area
  - Total: 2.98 sq mi (7.73 km^{2})
  - Land: 2.98 sq mi (7.73 km^{2})
  - Water: 0 sq mi (0.00 km^{2})
- Elevation: 981 ft (299 m)

Population (2020)
  - Total: 3,536
  - Density: 1,184.5/sq mi (457.35/km^{2})
- Time zone: UTC-5 (Eastern (EST))
  - Summer (DST): UTC-4 (EDT)
- ZIP code: 37931
- Area code: 865
- FIPS code: 47-38800
- GNIS feature ID: 2804639

Karns is an unincorporated community and census-designated place in northwest Knox County, Tennessee, about 11 miles (18 km) northwest of the center of Knoxville. The population of the CDP was 3,536 at the 2020 census.

== History ==
The community was formerly called Beaver Ridge. However, in 1913 when the first high school building was erected in Karns, the school was named in honor of Professor Thomas Conner Karns (1845–1911), the first Superintendent of Public Instruction for Knox County. Later, in the 1950s, the community voted to officially change its name from Beaver Ridge/Byington to Karns.

== Geography ==
Karns is located in the Beaver Creek Valley between Beaver Ridge and Copper Ridge, both of which are elongate ridges typical of the Ridge-and-Valley Appalachians. The center of the community is located at 35°58′55″N 84°06′50″W (35.982, -84.114). Elevation ranges from about 960 to 1,000 feet (300 m) above sea level. Beaver Creek, a tributary of the Clinch River, flows through the community.

== Demographics ==
Historical population
Census	Pop.	Note	%±
2020	3,536		—
U.S. Decennial Census

=== 2020 census ===
As of the 2020 census, Karns had a population of 3,536. The median age was 37.5 years. 26.6% of residents were under the age of 18 and 14.6% of residents were 65 years of age or older. For every 100 females there were 85.5 males, and for every 100 females age 18 and over there were 81.5 males age 18 and over.

100.0% of residents lived in urban areas, while 0.0% lived in rural areas.

There were 1,310 households in Karns, of which 39.2% had children under the age of 18 living in them. Of all households, 59.3% were married-couple households, 12.2% were households with a male householder and no spouse or partner present, and 23.6% were households with a female householder and no spouse or partner present. About 19.9% of all households were made up of individuals and 7.6% had someone living alone who was 65 years of age or older.

There were 1,374 housing units, of which 4.7% were vacant. The homeowner vacancy rate was 1.0% and the rental vacancy rate was 4.7%.

Racial composition as of the 2020 census
Race	Number	Percent
White	3,043	86.1%
Black or African American	130	3.7%
American Indian and Alaska Native	17	0.5%
Asian	53	1.5%
Native Hawaiian and Other Pacific Islander	6	0.2%
Some other race	33	0.9%
Two or more races	254	7.2%
Hispanic or Latino (of any race)	131	3.7%

== Economy ==
Karns has grown from primarily a farming area to a community with a population of over 19,000. Mixed among the remaining farms and pastures are subdivisions, small businesses, schools, and light industry. Industries in the community include Unitrac Railroad Materials, a manufacturer of railroad components. The Karns schools are part of Knox County Schools, and including Karns High School, enroll over 3,700 students from Karns, Ball Camp, Hardin Valley, and Solway. Most people commute to work outside of the community.

== Education ==
Karns is the site of several public schools operated by Knox County Schools. Public elementary schools in the area are Karns Elementary School, Ball Camp Elementary School, Amherst Elementary School, and Hardin Valley Elementary School. Three middle schools, Karns Middle School, Hardin Valley Middle School, and Northwest Middle School include grades 6, 7, and 8. The community's long-time high school is Karns High School. A new high school, Hardin Valley Academy, opened in 2008 to reduce pressure on Karns, Farragut, and Bearden High Schools due to growth in the student population in western Knox County.

In addition, it is the site of Grace Christian Academy, a K-12 private school operated as a ministry of Grace Baptist Church.

== Public services ==
Karns is the site of a Knox County public library branch, a branch post office, and the Karns Community Club building.

The Karns Fire Department serves a 65-square-mile (170 km^{2}) area of western Knox County from four fire stations located in Karns, Ball Camp, Hardin Valley, and Solway. Karns Fire Department provides fire suppression, emergency medical first responder services, public assists, and rescue services on a subscription-based service. Ambulance services are primarily provided by American Medical Response (AMR), per contract with Knox County. The Knox County Sheriff's Department is responsible for law enforcement services.
