= Fairview High School (Tennessee) =

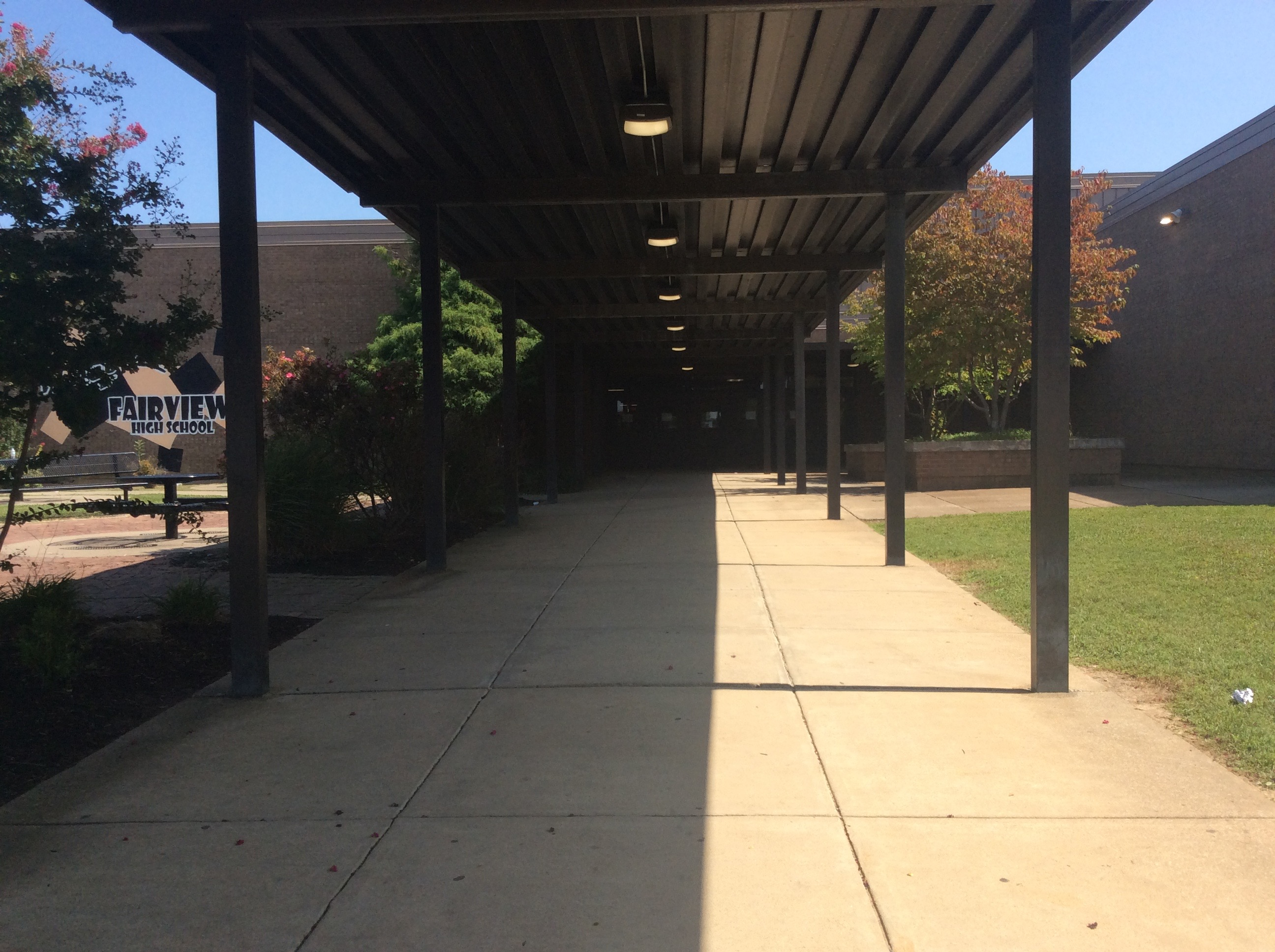
- Covered walkway at the main entrance to Fairview High School in Fairview, Tennessee

Location
- 2595 Fairview Boulevard; Fairview, Williamson County, Tennessee 37062; United States; 35°56′53.39″N 87°8′27.53″W

Information
- Type: Public
- Established: 1956
- School district: Williamson County Schools
- Principal: Chris Butler
- Staff: 52.56 (FTE)
- Grades: 9–12
- Enrollment: 719 (2023–2024)
- Student to teacher ratio: 13.68
- Colors: Black and Gold
- Athletics conference: TSSAA
- Team name: Yellow Jackets
- Rival: Fred J. Page High School; Nolensville High School
- Accreditation: Southern Association of Colleges and Schools
- Feeder schools: Fairview Middle School
- Website: fvhs.wcs.edu

Fairview High School is a public high school located in Fairview, Tennessee, United States. Founded in 1956 as West High School, Fairview High serves the western section of Williamson County for students in grades 9–12.

The school is accredited by the Southern Association of Colleges and Schools.

== Administration ==
Dr. Kurt Jones, formerly an assistant principal of Independence High School and native to Bridge Creek, Oklahoma, has served as the principal of Fairview High School since May 2018. Two assistant principals, Ellen Browne and Chris Butler, serve the 11–12th and 9–10th grade students respectively.

== History ==
Fairview High School opened in 1956 as West High School, serving students who lived in the western half of Williamson County. Initially serving grades 7 through 12, its first graduating class consisted of twenty students. In 1962, the name of the school was changed to Fairview High School. The school moved to a new building at its current location in 1982. Since then, the school has undergone several classroom additions and other renovations to increase capacity and improve athletic facilities. A 500-seat performing arts center, including restrooms, a new lobby, and two additional classrooms, opened in February 2017. The auditorium was built as part of a multi-phase project that called for building auditoriums at all Williamson County middle and high schools.

== Arts ==
=== Performance arts ===
The Fairview Band consists of a concert band, competition band, chamber ensembles, color guard, and winter guard. During the 2016–2017 season, the competition band began participating as an indoor winds group during the winter months instead of as a fall marching band. An orchestra, which allows students to progress to state and regional ensembles, is present as an elective course and makes several yearly performances; a chorus, linked to a course in singing, also performs regularly.

The Fairview High School theater department offers four levels of dramatics classes as well as two annual stage plays, and a Thespian Society organizes other performance events.

=== Visual arts ===
Fairview High School offers an array of visual arts courses, the subjects of which include drawing, painting, photography, sculpting, printmaking, ceramics, and digital works. Advanced Placement programs are offered in art for upper-level students. The art department displays student artwork throughout the building during the school year.

== Extracurriculars ==
=== Athletics ===
Fairview offers TSSAA-sanctioned baseball, basketball, bowling, cross country, football, golf, soccer, softball, tennis, track and field, volleyball, and wrestling programs. Fairview High school wrestling team runner up 2020 and state champions in 2021

=== Student associations ===
Clubs at the school include organizations for the academic decathlon cheerleading, chess, dance, Future Farmers of America, HOSA, Model UN, National Beta Club, science bowl, National Technical Honor Society, Spanish National Honor Society, student government, a student newspaper, the Technology Student Association, and Youth in Government, among others.
