= Fred J. Page High School =

Location
- 6281 Arno Road; Franklin, Williamson County, Tennessee 37064; United States; 35°50′50″N 86°45′02″W

Information
- Type: Public
- Motto: United in the Pursuit of Excellence
- Established: 1975
- School district: Williamson County Schools
- NCES District ID: 4704530
- CEEB code: 430405
- NCES School ID: 470453001806
- Principal: Katherine Hill
- Staff: 77.18 (FTE)
- Grades: 9–12
- Enrollment: 1,356 (2023-2024)
  - Grade 9: 376
  - Grade 10: 315
  - Grade 11: 359
  - Grade 12: 306
- Student to teacher ratio: 17.57
- Colors: Red, white, and blue
- Athletics conference: TSSAA
- Team name: Patriots
- Rival: Fairview High School; Nolensville High School
- Accreditation: Southern Association of Colleges and Schools
- Newspaper: The Page Turner
- Feeder schools: Page Middle School
- Website: phs.wcs.edu

Fred J. Page High School (commonly referred to as Page High or PHS) is a public high school in Franklin, Tennessee, United States. The school serves the eastern section of Williamson County for students in grades 9–12.

The school is accredited by the Southern Association of Colleges and Schools and bears the name of former Williamson County Schools Superintendent Frederick Jackson Page.

== Frederick Jackson Page ==
Page High School was named after Frederick Jackson Page (1863–1944), the first Superintendent of Williamson County Schools. He served in that position for 42 years (1899–1941) retiring at the age of 77. Superintendent Page gained a reputation nationally as a revolutionary educator, scholar and author. He was instrumental in the county's expansion from 8 grades to 12 grades in the early 1900s, lengthened the school year from five months to nine months, and introduced the ideas of summer school for remediation purposes and increased rigor in elementary school. Page revolutionized the teacher certification process and introduced the idea of uniform textbooks to replace teacher-made materials, additionally consolidating hundreds of tiny schoolhouses into larger, centralized institutions. Page retired in 1941 and died on April 9, 1944.

== Administration ==
Katherine Hill is the principal of Page High. The school has four assistant principals.

== History ==
Fred J. Page School was completed in 1975 on 40 acres of Tennessee farmland at a cost of $3 million. Built in the unincorporated town of Rudderville and serving grades 7-12, the school was posthumously named for Frederick Page 31 years after his death. The building was designed by architect Earl Swensson, an architect who also designed the Schermerhorn Symphony Center in Nashville, TN. L.L. Poe Construction Company served as contractor on the project just seven years after completing the Keathley University Center on the campus of Middle Tennessee State University. The new school was constructed to remove and consolidate the upper grades of Bethesda and College Grove, two K-12 schools that were bitter rivals. Bethesda, College Grove and Nolensville subsequently became K-6 schools while Page would serve grades 7-12.

Built to serve the eastern section of Williamson County with a capacity of 1000 students, Page High School's initial enrollment was around 850. The inaugural faculty included principal Bob Greathouse, assistant principal Mayes Waters, two guidance counselors, one librarian and 36 teachers. In 2000, Page High School marked its 25th anniversary with nine of the original 36 teachers still employed. As of 2016-17, Jimmy Baker is the only active teacher from the original faculty. The original school building included 34 classrooms, but an expansion in the 1990s increased that number to current total of 54 classrooms with an expanded capacity for 1215 students.

In 1981, Fred J. Page Middle School opened across the street at which point the original Fred J. Page became a high school exclusively serving grades 9-12. In 1985, several scenes of the critically acclaimed movie At Close Range were filmed on location at the entrance of Fred J. Page High School. The movie was released in 1986 boasting an all-star cast including Sean Penn and Christopher Walken and Page High students were used as extras.

Until 2004, the Page High School zone included the towns of Thompson's Station and the northern half of Spring Hill. However, throughout that decade the area became the fastest growing population in the United States swelling to over 276% growth. The initial population explosion was attributed to the opening of the Saturn Corporation automobile plant in Spring Hill. At one point 20% of the students at Page High School were Michigan natives, most of whom were families relocated from the Midwest by Saturn's parent company General Motors. Following the construction of Independence High School and most recently Summit High School, Page no longer serves the Thompson's Station and Spring Hill areas of the county.

Page High School has the smallest capacity of all nine traditional high schools in Williamson County. In 2016, the district began planning for campus improvements at Page middle and high schools. The proposed multi-phase plan was released in February 2017 and would add classrooms, expand common areas like the cafeteria and media center, improve athletic facilities, and create additional parking. The first phase of this plan was approved at a county commission meeting in October 2017.

== Academics and testing ==
During the 2013-14 school year, Page High School in Williamson County and Farragut High School in Knox County were the only two high schools in Tennessee that ranked among the top 5% in academic performance and the top 5% in academic progress. At the conclusion of the 2013–14 school year, Page High was awarded Platinum High Achievement status for the fourth consecutive year through the National High Schools That Work initiative of the Southern Regional Education Board. The school is among only a few schools in Tennessee bestowed National Blue Ribbon status and was one of three high school finalists for the 2011 SCORE prize after demonstrating tremendous academic gains. In 2013, Dr. Andrea Anthony was named the Tennessee High School Principal of the Year by the National Association of Secondary School Principals.

During the 2014-15 school year, The Daily Beast website ranked Page High School the top school in Williamson County, the second best school in Tennessee, and 59th best in America (based on college acceptance rates, AP course enrollment, college entrance exam scores and college preparedness among other criteria). During the same school year, U.S. News & World Report named Page High School Tennessee's top-ranked public school zone in both mathematics and English proficiency for the fifth consecutive year, Tennessee's only school zone to surpass 90% proficiency in mathematics (93%), and the only school zone to surpass 90% proficiency in English (95%). The website Schooldigger.com named Page High the top secondary school in the state while Newsweek named the school zone the second best academically in Tennessee with the 7th highest average SAT score in the United States. An independent study ranked the AP Calculus program the strongest in the state of Tennessee among zoned public schools.

From 2010 to 2015, the school was ranked among America's top 500 high schools and the best school zone in Tennessee by Newsweek magazine and U.S. News & World Report; however, during the 2015-16 school year Page High School dropped out of the top 1000 schools.

The class of 2016 had an average ACT score of 22.4, higher than the state average of 19.8 and national average of 21. The school offers 21 Advanced Placement course several career and technical education courses including veterinary science, architecture, AV production, computer science, marketing, nursing, and engineering. The class of 2018 had an average ACT score of 24.

== Arts ==
Page offers visual art, instrumental music, and theater classes. The marching band won the Tennessee Division II State Marching Band Championship from 2004–2010 and from 2014–2015. The Championship is owned and sanctioned by the band directors of all Tennessee high schools that qualify as being Division II (based on certified school enrollment numbers of 500-1000 students, grades 9-12). The band has also been named a finalist at multiple Bands of America regional championships, including being named Class AA Champion at the 2014 BOA Regional Championship in Powder Springs, GA. The band is also a 2-time semifinalist at the BOA Grand National Championships.

== Athletics ==
=== TSSAA-sanctioned sports ===
The athletic department at Page High School features 18 varsity sports. Since 2018, the school competes in the Tennessee Secondary School Athletic Association in Class 5A for football, Class AAA for baseball, basketball, softball, and volleyball, and the large division for remaining sports.

The school competes in the following TSSAA-sanctioned sports, and has won nine state championships, three in soccer and six in volleyball.

- Baseball
- Boys' basketball
- Girls' basketball
- Bowling
- Boys' cross country
- Girls' cross country
- Football
- Boys' golf
- Girls' golf
- Boys' soccer: 2022
- Girls' soccer: 2021, 2022
- Softball
- Boys' tennis
- Girls' tennis
- Boys' track
- Girls' track
- Volleyball: 2000, 2001, 2002, 2003, 2010, 2011
- Wrestling

=== Club Sports ===
In addition to TSSAA sports, the school also has numerous club sports.

- Cheerleading
- Hockey (in union with Hume-Fogg High School)
- Boys' lacrosse (first season in 2017)
- Girls' lacrosse
- Swimming
- Rugby (through Harpeth Harlequins)
- eSports

== Notable alumni ==
- Dennis Harrison, Former Page High football coach and teacher, NFL veteran 1978–1988 who spent most of his career with the Philadelphia Eagles
