= Brentwood High School (Tennessee) =

Location
- 5304 Murray Lane; Brentwood, Tennessee 37027; United States; 36.01628°N 86.81532°W

Information
- Type: Public
- Motto: Excellence Through Teaching And Learning
- Established: 1982
- School district: Williamson County Schools
- Principal: Kevin Keidel
- Teaching staff: 84.84 (FTE)
- Grades: 9–12
- Enrollment: 1,647 (2023-2024)
- Student to teacher ratio: 19.41
- Colors: Blue and gold
- Athletics conference: TSSAA
- Team name: Bruins
- Rival: Ravenwood High School Franklin High School Brentwood Academy
- Accreditation: Southern Association of Colleges and Schools
- Yearbook: Mark of the Bruin
- Feeder schools: Brentwood Middle School Scales Elementary School Lipscomb Elementary School Edmondson Elementary School
- Website: bhs.wcs.edu

Brentwood High School (BHS) is a public high school located in Brentwood, Tennessee, United States. The school serves the north central section of Williamson County for students in grades 9–12.

The school is accredited by the Southern Association of Colleges and Schools. In their 2022 rankings, U.S. News & World Report ranked Brentwood High School fifth in Tennessee and #301 in the country.

== History ==
The school opened in 1982 to serve the rapidly growing population in the northern part of Williamson County and relieve overcrowding at Franklin High School.

Since it opened, there have been a significant number of renovations and expansions to the campus to both expand capacity and improve arts and athletics facilities. In 1985, additional classrooms were constructed to keep up with the school's quickly growing enrollment. In 1987, some arts facilities were added including drama and chorus classrooms, and an auditorium that also functioned as an additional gymnasium. Around 2000, several athletic facility improvements were made including a wrestling facility, field house with weight room, football locker room, multipurpose athletic facility, football stadium improvements, and new soccer facilities. In 2014, the former auditorium was converted to a permanent gymnasium and 500-seat performing arts center was constructed. The new auditorium cost $4.8 million and was built as part of a multi-phase project that called for building auditoriums at all Williamson County middle and high schools. A $19.6 million improvement project that includes additional classroom space, improved athletic facilities, and a new three-story STEM building is came under construction. The project was completed in March 2019 and added additional parking and improve both vehicular and pedestrian circulation around the campus. This addition had its space originally split between the BHS and the neighboring middle school, BMS. This division ended before the beginning of the school year in 2025, since the middle school completed the complete teardown and reconstruction of their new building.

== Academics and testing ==
In Newsweek's 2008 list of America's Top High Schools, BHS ranked first for Tennessee comprehensive public high schools and 192nd in the nation.

The current graduation rate of BHS is 98.4%, the highest among Williamson County Schools and 88% of the most recent graduating class went on to attend a four-year university. The school follows the semester system with ½ credit earned per course each semester. Students are enrolled in 6 credit classes. Twenty-one Advanced Placement classes are offered at Brentwood. In 2006, 79% of the students received a 3 or better on the AP test, 80% received a 3 or better in 2007, and 82% receiving a 3 or better in 2008.

The ACT is required to graduate. The average score continues to increase each year, reaching a new record high of 26.2 in 2015. Although not required, some students also choose to take the SAT. The school has consistently produced more than 10 National Merit Semi-Finalists since 2013, and has constantly produced more than 20 Semifinalists since 2021, most recently producing 24 Semifinalists for the Class of 2023.

== Arts ==
=== Band ===
The marching band, participated in the 2007 Alamo Bowl (San Antonio, TX), Macy's Thanksgiving Day parade, Boscov's Thanksgiving Day Parade, IKEA Thanksgiving Day Parade, and the Fiesta Bowl National Championships, and can be heard on the Brad Paisley song "Online" from his album "5th Gear." The band has been named a finalist at several Bands of America regional championship events and was named USBands Southern States champion in 2015.

=== Choir ===
The choir won the Grand Championships in Atlanta in 2003 and first place at the National Choral Festival in Gatlinburg, Tennessee.

=== Orchestra ===
The Brentwood High School Orchestra includes violin, viola, cello, and double bass players. Members of the BHS Orchestra have been selected for the All-Midstate and All State Orchestras as well as the National Honors Orchestra.

=== Theatre ===
The Brentwood High School Theatre Program was started in 1992 by Lisa Moody. Moody retired in 2024 after 32 years. Brentwood offers four levels of theatre class and a theatre production class, which teaches the elements of backstage production and set design. The Theatre program typically performs a fall play and a spring musical each year. In 2016, the group was selected to perform its fall 2015 production, Any Number Can Die, at the Tennessee State Thespian Conference at Middle Tennessee State University; the group was selected to perform again at the 2020 Tennessee State Thespian Conference with its fall 2019 production Much Ado About Nothing.

== Extracurricular activities ==
=== Forensics ===
Brentwood forensics is a member school of the Tennessee High School Speech and Debate Society and the National Forensic League. Notable alumni from the program include William Hong and Sully Mrkva, who were each nationally ranked in public forum debate and held the nationally acclaimed title of TOC Champions for the 2022 season, they also placed top 6 in NSDA Nationals.

=== WBHS-9 ===
Brentwood High School is one of the few high schools in the state of Tennessee that owns and operates its own TV station. The City of Brentwood first gave Channel 9 to Brentwood High School from its cable company, Comcast in 1999. For the first two years, the channel simply displayed school text announcements around the clock. In spring 2001, Mark Madison and the television production classes began operating the channel and developed a full-time station with coverage for the entire northern half of Williamson County.

WBHS-9 has won numerous state, regional, and national awards in various film festivals and other video competitions around the country. The station is often viewed has a model for other schools around Tennessee that want to develop a television production operation. Additionally, WBHS-9 was tasked with installing in-house, closed-circuit television stations at five Williamson County elementary schools for morning announcements and other internal broadcasts.

Ronnie Adcock took charge of the program in the fall of 2008 after Madison's death that spring and continues to operate the channel with almost six hours each day of news, announcements, sports, arts, and other school events. Adcock retired in 2022, leaving Sloan Ashworth to take over as the new program head.

Many of the station's videos and newscasts can be found on its YouTube channel.

=== Robotics ===
The Brentwood High School Robotics Club (96504) consists of several VEX Robotics teams (club code 96504) and a BEST Robotics team (code 1028). Originally founded by Rohan Gupta, Oliver, and Sid in 2014, the club only participated in BEST, but expanded to support VEX teams in 2016. The club was sponsored by Dr. Roberto Marrero as a representative from the school until the 2025-26 year, where Ms. Rachel Hohl and Mr. Curtis Haley took over the duties.

In the fall of 2025, two private robotics teams were formed as an offshoot from the main club, 40000A (Apogee) and 40000E (Equinox).

==== Several accomplishments ====
- BEST: Qualified to South's BEST in 2023 and 2025
- 96504C: Over Under (2024) Worlds Divisional Semifinalist
- 96504P: High Stakes (2025) States Finalist and Haunted Signature Event Tournament Champions

==== Worlds qualifications ====
- Tipping Point (2022): 96504C
- Spin Up (2023): 96504C, 96504D
- Over Under (2024): 96504C, 96504D, 96504E, 96504P
- High Stakes (2025): 96504D, 96504E, 96504P

==== Teams ====
- Starstruck (2016-17): 97158A (Promethians)
- In the Zone (2017-18): 96504A (Lightning Bolts), 96504B (Polar Bears), 96504C (Circuit Breakers)
- Turning Point (2018-19): 96504A (DozeKidz), 96504E (No Idea Squad), 97158A (Bruin Robotics)
- Tower Takeover (2019-20): 96504A (The Riveters), 96504B (The Omnivores), 96504R (Runtime Error)
- Change Up (2020-21): 96504A (The Riveters), 96504B (The Omnivores), 96504C (So Innefective), 96504M (Robota-Sistas), 96504P (Pixelated), 96504R (Runtime Error), 96054U (Unbotables)
- Tipping Point (2021-22): 96504A (The Riveters), 96504B (The Omnivores), 96504C (Exotek), 96504E (No Idea Squad), 96504P (Pixelated), 96504R (Runtime Error)
- Spin Up (2022-23): 96504A (The Riveters), 96504B (The Omnivores), 96504C (Exotek), 96504D (The Mad Scientists), 96504E (No Idea Squad), 96504M (Scrapegoat), 96504P (Emu Warfare), 96504Z (Z-Dawgs)
- Over Under (2023-24): 96504A (The Riveters), 96504B (The Omnivores), 96504C (Exotek), 96504D (The Mad Scientists), 96504E (Tech-N0-Logic), 96504M (Vanguard), 96504P (Emu Warfare), 96504T (Da Monkeys), 96504X (X-Terminator)
- High Stakes (2024-25): 96504A (The Riveters), 96504B (The Omnivores), 96504D (The Mad Scientists), 96504E (Tech-N0-Logic), 96504G (Gambit), 96504M (Vanguard), 96504P (Emu Warfare), 96504T (Monkey Mayhem), 96504V (Venture), 96504X (Darkstar)
- Push Back (2025-26): 96504E (Tech-N0-Logic), 96504G (The G's), 96504V (Varmitech), 96504X (XCALIBUR)

== Athletics ==
=== TSSAA-sanctioned sports ===
The below TSSAA-sanctioned teams have won a combined 77 state championships, the most in Williamson County Schools, Tennessee public schools, and fifth most in the state. Years indicate state championships.

- Baseball: 2017
- Boys' basketball
- Girls' basketball
- Boys' bowling
- Girls' bowling
- Boys' cross country: 2011, 2012, 2013, 2015, 2016
- Girls' cross country: 2003, 2004, 2020, 2021, 2022, 2023
- Football: 2002
- Boys' golf: 2015, 2021, 2023
- Boys' lacrosse: 2008, 2023, 2024
- Girls' lacrosse
- Girls' golf: 1997, 2001
- Boys' soccer: 1995, 2005, 2008, 2012 2022, 2023
- Girls' soccer: 1997, 2012,
- Softball: 1989
- Boys' tennis: 2005, 2010, 2012, 2013, 2019
- Girls' tennis: 2001, 2002, 2003, 2016, 2017, 2018, 2019 2019, 2022
- Boys' track: 2007, 2008, 2010, 2011, 2012, 2014, 2015, 2016, 2018, 2019, 2023
- Girls' track: 2002, 2003, 2004, 2005, 2006, 2014, 2016, 2021 2022
- Volleyball: 1998, 1999, 2000, 2001, 2002, 2004, 2006, 2007, 2013, 2014, 2015, 2016, 2017, 2018, 2019, 2020
- Wrestling

=== Club sports ===
In addition to TSSAA sports, the school also has numerous club sports. Years indicate state championships.

- Cheerleading
  - Varsity: 1997, 2012
  - Freshmen: 1998, 2013
- Dance (jazz): 2007, 2016
- Hockey: 2002, 2011, 2015, 2018
- Boys' rugby: 2002, 2003, 2004, 2005, 2006, 2010
- Girls' rugby: 2010
- Swimming: 1986, 1988, 1989, 1991, 2003, 2005, 2006

These sports have a combined 27 state championships, which gives Brentwood a total of 104 state championships. In addition to the numerous state championships, all TSSAA-sponsored athletic teams have achieved TSSAA Academic Achievement Award each of the last six years.

== Notable alumni ==
- Rachel Cruze, personal finance author and media personality
- Dayna Curry, Christian aid worker & missionary (class of 1989)
- Kate Hughes, retired soccer player
- Kesha, singer-songwriter
- Chris Morman, retired soccer player (class of 1996)
- Lucas Patrick, American football player (class of 2011)
- Robbie Ray, professional baseball player for the San Francisco Giants (class of 2010)
- Bryan Reynolds, professional baseball player for the Pittsburgh Pirates (class of 2013)
- Thomas Welch, former NFL offensive lineman (class of 2005)
- Mike Purcell, 22-year High school men's and women's coach, 5 state championships.
