= List of school districts in Tennessee =

This is a list of public school districts in Tennessee, sorted alphabetically.

The majority of school districts are operated by county governments, some by city governments, and the Achievement School District by the state government. The U.S. Census Bureau does not consider those to be independent governments. There are also "special school districts," and those are independent governments.

== A ==
- Achievement School District
- Alamo City Schools
- Alcoa City Schools
- Anderson County Schools
- Arlington Community Schools
- Athens City Elementary Schools

== B ==
- Bartlett City Schools
- Bedford County Schools
- Bells City Schools
- Benton County Schools
- Bledsoe County Schools
- Blount County Schools
- Bradford Special Schools
- Bradley County Schools
- Bristol City Schools

== C ==
- Campbell County Schools
- Cannon County Schools
- Carroll County Schools
- Carter County Schools
- Cheatham County Schools
- Chester County Schools
- Claiborne County Schools
- Clarksville-Montgomery County School System
- Clay County Schools
- Cleveland City Schools
- Cocke County Schools
- Coffee County Schools
- Crockett County Schools
- Cumberland County Schools

== D ==
- Dayton City Schools
- Decatur County Schools
- Dekalb County Schools
- Dickson County Schools
- Dyer County Schools
- Dyersburg City Schools

== E ==
- Elizabethton City Schools
- Etowah City Elementary Schools

== F ==
- Fayette County Schools
- Fayetteville City Elementary Schools
- Fentress County Schools
- Franklin County Schools
- Franklin Special School District

== G ==
- Gibson County Special School District
- Giles County Schools
- Grainger County Schools
- Greene County Schools
- Greeneville City Schools
- Grundy County Schools

== H ==
- Hamblen County Schools
- Hamilton County Schools
- Hancock County Schools
- Hardeman County Schools
- Hardin County Schools
- Hawkins County Schools
- Haywood County Schools
- Henderson County Schools
- Henry County Schools
- Hickman County Schools
- Hollow Rock-Bruceton Special School District
- Houston County Schools
- Humboldt City Schools
- Humphreys County Schools
- Huntingdon Special Schools

== J ==
- Jackson County Schools
- Jackson-Madison Consolidated Schools
- Jefferson County Schools
- Johnson City Schools
- Johnson County Schools

== K ==
- Kingsport City Schools
- Knox County Schools

== L ==
- Lake County School System
- Lauderdale County Schools
- Lawrence County Schools
- Lebanon Special School District
- Lenoir City Schools
- Lewis County Schools
- Lexington City Elementary Schools
- Lincoln County Schools
- Loudon County Schools

== M ==
- Macon County Schools
- Manchester City Schools
- Marion County Schools
- Marshall County Schools
- Maryville City Schools
- Maury County Schools
- McKenzie Special School District
- McMinn County Schools
- McNairy County Schools
- Meigs County Schools
- Memphis City Schools
- Metropolitan Nashville Public Schools
- Milan Special School District
- Monroe County Schools
- Montgomery County Schools
- Moore County Schools
- Morgan County Schools
- Murfreesboro City Schools

== N ==
- Newport City Elementary Schools

== O ==
- Oak Ridge City Schools
- Obion County Schools
- Oneida City Schools
- Overton County Schools

== P ==
- Paris City Special Schools
- Perry County Schools
- Pickett County Schools
- Polk County Schools
- Putnam County Schools

== R ==
- Rhea County Schools
- Richard City Special School District
- Roane County Schools
- Robertson County Schools
- Rogersville City Elementary Schools
- Rutherford County Schools

== S ==
- Scott County Schools
- Sequatchie County School District
- Sevier County Schools
- Shelby County Schools
- Smith County Schools
- South Carroll Special School District
- Stewart County Schools
- Sullivan County Schools
- Sumner County Schools
- Sweetwater City Schools

== T ==
- Tipton County Schools
- Trenton City Schools
- Trousdale County Schools
- Tullahoma City Schools

== U ==
- Unicoi School
- Union City Schools
- Union County School

== V ==
- Van Buren County Schools

== W ==
- Warren County Schools
- Washington County Schools
- Wayne County Schools
- Weakley County Schools
- West Carroll Special School District
- White County Schools
- Williamson County Schools
- Wilson County Schools

== See also ==
- List of high schools in Tennessee
