= Fairview High School =

Fairview High School can refer to:

In Canada:

- Fairview High School, in Fairview, Alberta

In the United States:

- Fairview High School (Cullman, Alabama)
- Fairview High School (Colorado), in Boulder, Colorado
- Fairview High School (Kentucky), in Westwood, Kentucky (postal address in Ashland, Kentucky)
- Fairview High School (Louisiana), in Grant, Allen Parish, Louisiana
- Fairview High School, in Fairview, Michigan
- Fairview High School, in Fairview, Montana
- Fairview High School (Fairview Park, Ohio)
- Fairview High School (Sherwood, Ohio)
- Fairview High School, in Fairview, Oklahoma
- Fairview High School (Pennsylvania), in Fairview Township, Pennsylvania
- Fairview High School (Tennessee), in Fairview, Tennessee

== See also ==
- Fair View High School
