= Rashaan Gaulden =

American football player (born 1995)

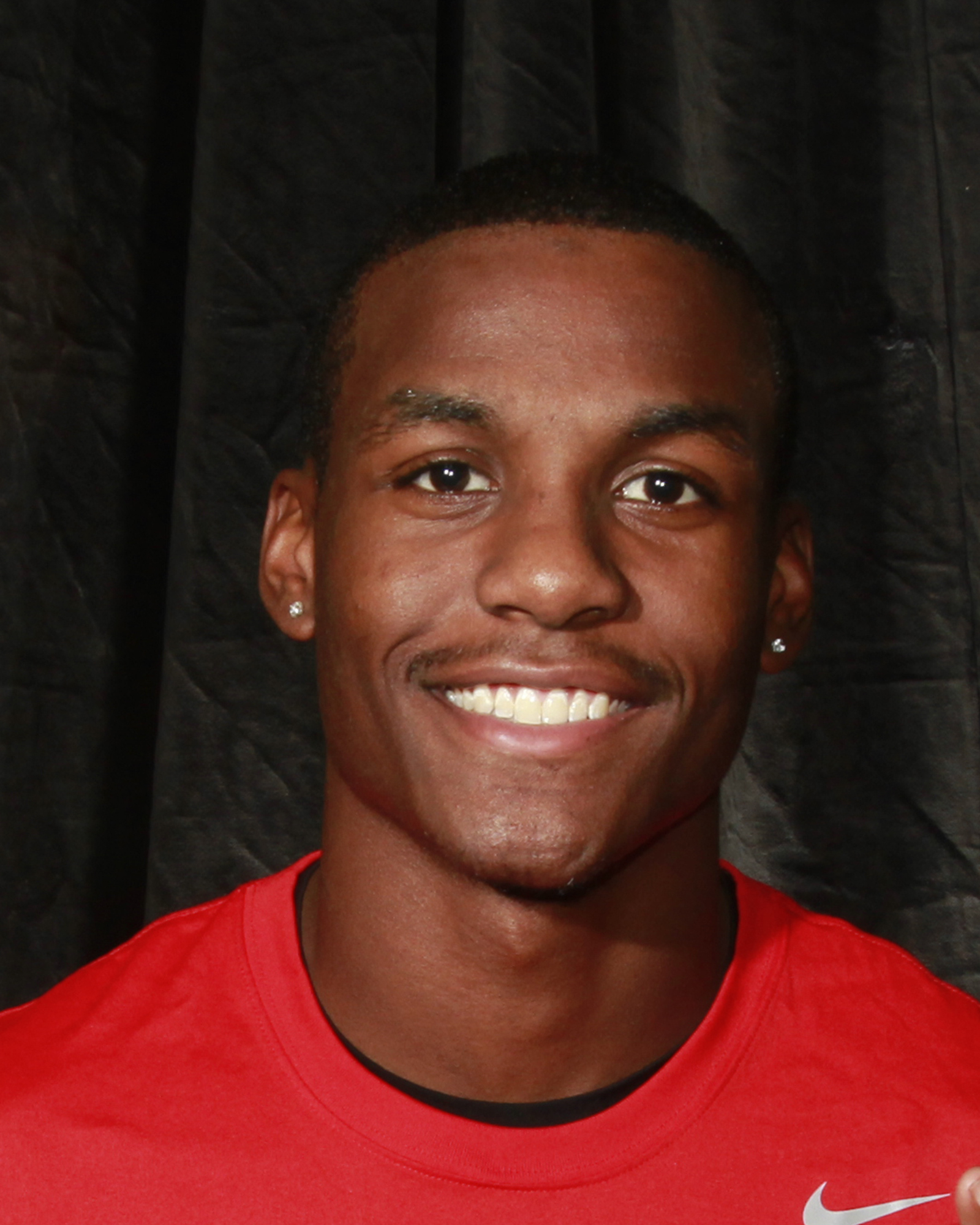
- Gaulden c. 2014

No. 28, 38, 33
- Position: Safety

Personal information
- Born: January 23, 1995 (age 31); Spring Hill, Tennessee, U.S.
- Listed height: 6 ft 0 in (1.83 m)
- Listed weight: 200 lb (91 kg)

Career information
- High school: Independence (Thompson's Station, Tennessee)
- College: Tennessee (2014–2017)
- NFL draft: 2018: 3rd round, 85th overall pick

Career history
- Carolina Panthers (2018–2019); New York Giants (2019); Las Vegas Raiders (2020); Calgary Stampeders (2022)*; Winnipeg Blue Bombers (2025)*
- * Offseason or practice squad member only

Career NFL statistics
- Total tackles: 20
- Pass deflections: 1
- Stats at Pro Football Reference

Rashaan Malik Gaulden (born January 23, 1995) is an American former professional football player who was a safety in the National Football League (NFL). He played college football for the Tennessee Volunteers, and was selected by the Carolina Panthers in the third round of the 2018 NFL draft.

== Early life ==
Gaulden attended Independence High School in Thompson's Station, Tennessee. Along with football, he also participated in track and field and was named an All-American after finishing fourth nationally in the 4x400 relay. During his senior football season, he recorded 193 tackles. Gaulden committed to play football for the Tennessee Volunteers on July 20, 2013, choosing the Volunteers over programs such as Vanderbilt and South Carolina.

== College career ==
Gaulden played at the University of Tennessee from 2014 to 2017 under head coach Butch Jones. As a true freshman in 2014, Gaulden played in 11 games, making seven total tackles.

Gaulden missed the 2015 season due to a foot injury suffered during training camp in August and took a medical redshirt.

Gaulden returned in 2016 as a redshirt sophomore and played in all 13 of Tennessee's games, recording 68 tackles (six for loss), four pass breakups and one forced fumble.

As a redshirt junior in 2017, Gaulden played in all 12 games of the season, tallying 65 tackles, one interception, five pass deflections, and three forced fumbles. His interception was the first of his collegiate career and came against the Florida Gators in a 26–20 loss. After the season, he declared for the 2018 NFL draft.

== Professional career ==
=== Pre-draft ===
On January 3, 2018, Gaulden released a statement through his Twitter account, announcing his decision to forgo his senior season and enter the 2018 NFL draft. He attended the NFL Scouting Combine in Indianapolis and completed all of the combine and positional drills. His 40-yard dash time was described as "not great" by NFL analyst Daniel Jeremiah, but Gaulden managed to perform well and show his agility in positional drills.

External videos
- Rashaan Gaulden's NFL Combine Workout

On March 19, 2018, Gaulden participated at Tennessee's pro day and weighed in at 191 lbs, which was six pounds lighter than his weight at the NFL Combine. He ran the 40-yard dash (4.69s), 20-yard dash (2.78s), 10-yard dash (1.64s), and short shuttle (4.26s). At the conclusion of the pre-draft process, Gaulden was projected to be a second round pick by NFL draft experts and scouts. He was ranked as the second best free safety prospect in the draft by DraftScout.com, was ranked the 10th best cornerback by Sports Illustrated, and was ranked the 13th best cornerback in the draft by Scouts Inc.

“Gaulden, the defensive back, he's kind of interesting. I don't know what he is. I watch him on tape. He plays nickel. He's tough. He hustles to the football. He's got some range. I want to see what he runs. I mean, he's 6-foot-1. He might even play corner, I don't know. If he runs 4.48 or something, he might be interesting as a long corner. He also might be interesting as a free safety, but I know he can play special teams. I kind of feel like right now he's probably an early third-day pick, but I think he could help himself.”

— Mike Mayock

Pre-draft measurables
Height	Weight	Arm length	Hand span	40-yard dash	10-yard split	20-yard split	20-yard shuttle	Three-cone drill	Vertical jump	Broad jump	Bench press
6 ft 1 in (1.85 m)	197 lb (89 kg)	30 3/4 in (0.78 m)	9 3/4 in (0.25 m)	4.61 s	1.62 s	2.69 s	4.33 s	7.16 s	30 in (0.76 m)	9 ft 11 in (3.02 m)	8 reps
All values from NFL Combine

=== Carolina Panthers ===
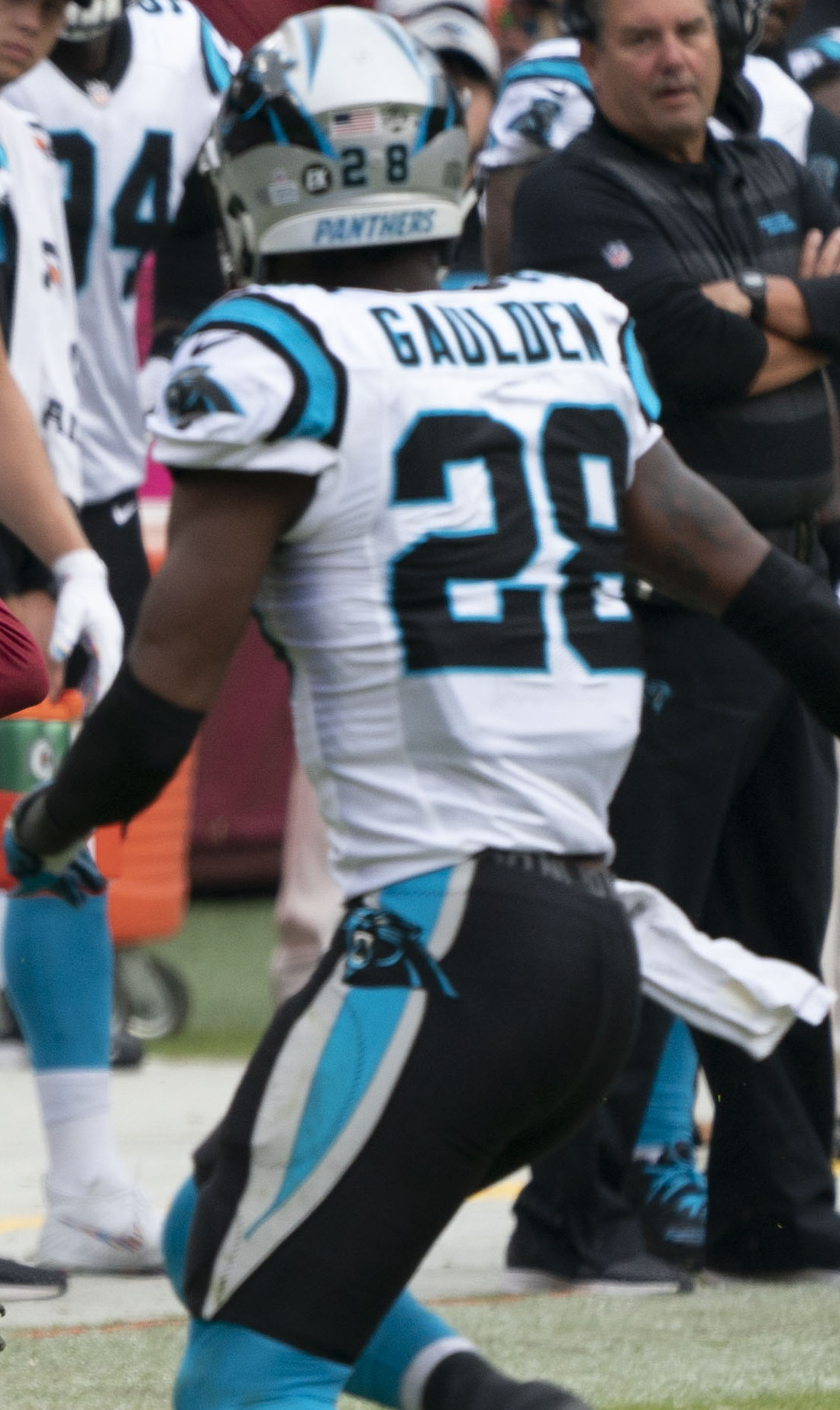
Gaulden with the Carolina Panthers in 2018

The Carolina Panthers selected Gaulden in the third round (85th overall) of the 2018 NFL draft, through a pick traded from the Buffalo Bills for Kelvin Benjamin. He was the seventh safety drafted in 2018. On May 12, 2018, the Panthers signed Gaulden to a four-year, $3.44 million contract that includes a signing bonus of $847,656. On November 25, 2019, Gaulden was waived by the Panthers.

External videos
- Panthers draft Rashaan Gaulden 85th overall

=== New York Giants ===
On December 4, 2019, Gaulden was signed to the practice squad of the New York Giants. He was promoted to the active roster on December 18. Gaulden was waived by the Giants on August 2, 2020.

Gaulden had a tryout with the Pittsburgh Steelers on August 17, 2020, and with the Tennessee Titans on August 23.

=== Las Vegas Raiders ===
On November 9, 2020, the Las Vegas Raiders signed Gaulden to their practice squad. He was elevated to the active roster on December 17 and 26 for the team's Weeks 15 and 16 games against the Los Angeles Chargers and Miami Dolphins, and reverted to the practice squad after each game. Gaulden signed a reserve/future contract with Las Vegas on January 5, 2021. He was waived by the Raiders on June 4.

=== Calgary Stampeders ===
On September 27, 2022, Gaulden was signed to the practice roster of the Calgary Stampeders of the Canadian Football League (CFL). He was released by the Stampeders on October 20.

=== Winnipeg Blue Bombers ===
Gaulden signed with the CFL's Winnipeg Blue Bombers on March 7, 2025. He was placed on the reserve/suspended list on May 11.
