= Williamson County Schools =

School district in Tennessee

Location
- Williamson County, Tennessee United States

District information
- Type: Public
- Grades: K-12
- Accreditation: Southern Association of Colleges and Schools
- Schools: 50
- Budget: $223,239,609

Students and staff
- Students: 38,100
- Teachers: 2,246
- Staff: 1,717
- Athletic conference: TSSAA

Other information
- Website: www.wcs.edu

Williamson County Schools (WCS) is a school district in Williamson County, Tennessee, United States. The district is currently made up of over 40,000 students attending 50 schools, including three new schools that opened as scheduled for the 2018–2019 school year. The district is rapidly growing, adding over 1000 new students each year.

Students who live within the K–8 Franklin Special School District zone attend WCS high schools Centennial or Franklin after completing eighth grade.

WCS is the sixth largest school district in Tennessee and offers a voluntary pre-K program for "at-risk children who are four (4) years of age on August 15."

Communities in Williamson County Schools for K-12 include Brentwood, Fairview, Nolensville, Thompson's Station, the county's portion of Spring Hill, and outer portions of Franklin. For high school it covers the entire county, including the remainder of Franklin.

== History ==
The school district began using the "Wit and Wisdom" curriculum in April 2020. Politically conservative activists criticized the curriculum, with the county division of Moms for Liberty first giving criticism, and with other groups lobbying the Tennessee Commissioner of Education to intervene. The website of Williamson County Schools stated that this curriculum does not include "critical race theory".

== Administrators ==
Jason Golden, Superintendent

Dave Allen, Assistant Superintendent of Teaching, Learning and Assessment (TLA)

Leslie Holman, Chief Financial Officer

Vickie Hall, Assistant Superintendent of Human Resources

Leigh Webb, Assistant Superintendent for Secondary Schools

Juli Oyer, Assistant Superintendent for Elementary Schools

Mark Samuels, Assistant Superintendent for Operations

== School Board ==
The Williamson County Board of Education consists of 12 members, each elected from one of the 12 voting districts for a four-year term. Following the retirement of Gary Anderson, Nancy Garrett was elected chairman and KC Haugh vice chairman.

First District: Tony Bostic

Second District: Dan Cash

Third District: Dennis Driggers

Fourth District: Josh Brown (Chairman)

Fifth District: Margie Johnson

Sixth District: Jay Galbreath

Seventh District: Mellissa Wyatt

Eighth District: Donna Clements

Ninth District: Claire Reeves (Vice-chairwoman)

Tenth District: Eric Welch

Eleventh District: Tonja Hibma

Twelfth District: Drason Beasley

Williamson County Schools made national news following a special session School Board meeting on August 10, 2021, during the COVID-19 pandemic in Tennessee. Ultimately a mask requirement for elementary school students, staff, and visitors was mandated. A viral video with millions of views shows parents yelling, "We know who you are. You can leave freely, but we will find you," “There’s a place for you guys — there’s a bad place in hell," and other negative remarks to doctors, nurses, and others who were in support of masks.

== Schools ==
=== Elementary schools (K-5) ===
WCS operates 28 elementary schools. Creekside Elementary opened in fall 2019 and moved into its permanent building in early January 2020.

- Allendale Elementary (2010)
- Amanda H. North Elementary (2023)
- Arrington Elementary School (2023)
- Bethesda Elementary (1936)
- Chapman's Retreat Elementary (2003)
- Clovercroft Elementary (2011)
- College Grove Elementary (1936)
- Creekside Elementary (2019)
- Crockett Elementary (1990)
- Discovery Virtual Elementary
- Edmondson Elementary (1995)
- Fairview Elementary (1962)
- Grassland Elementary (1873)
- Heritage Elementary (1999)
- Hillsboro Elementary (1905)
- Hunters Bend Elementary (1995)
- Jordan Elementary (2018)
- Kenrose Elementary (1999)
- Lipscomb Elementary (1866)
- Longview Elementary (2007)
- Mill Creek Elementary (2016)
- Nolensville Elementary (1937)
- Oak View Elementary (1993)
- Pearre Creek Elementary (2010)
- Scales Elementary (1977)
- Sunset Elementary (2005)
- Thompson's Station Elementary (2018)
- Trinity Elementary (1883)
- Walnut Grove Elementary (1990)
- Westwood Elementary (2000)
- Winstead Elementary (2002)

=== Middle schools (6-8) ===
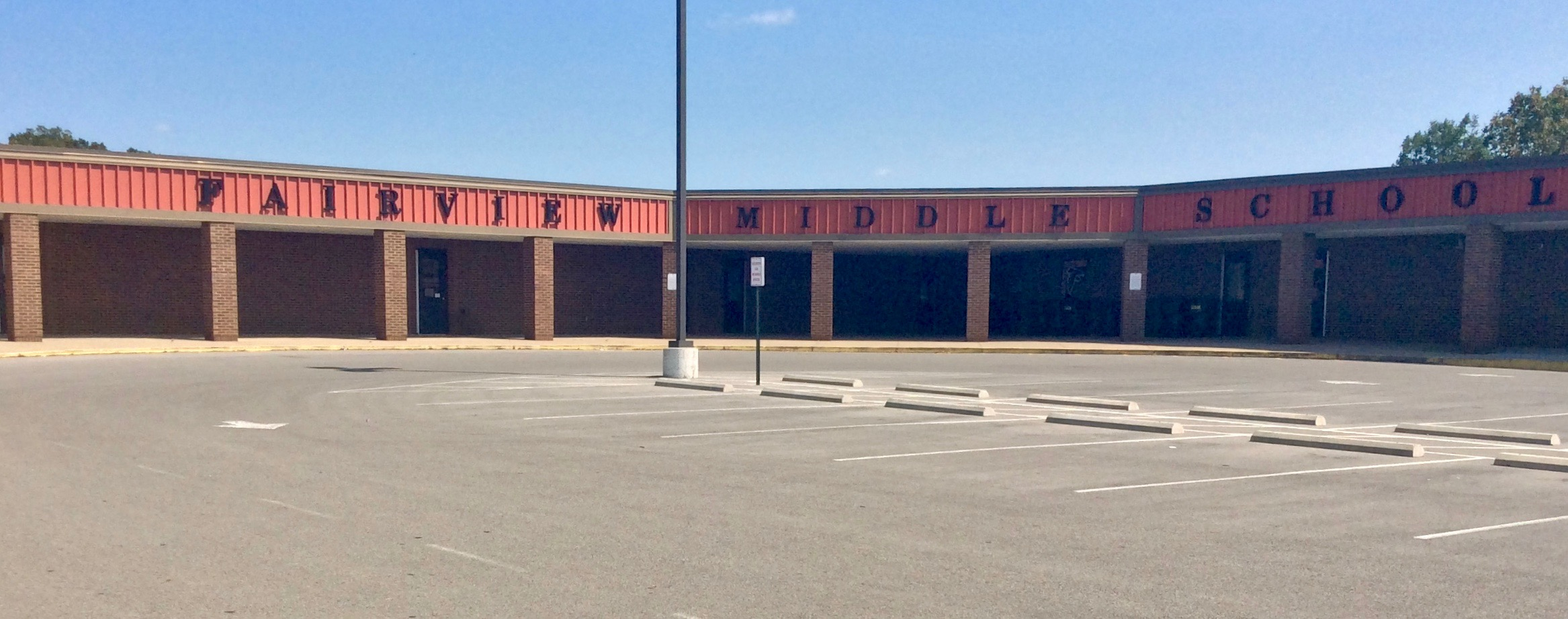
The front of Fairview Middle School in Fairview, Tennessee

WCS operates 12 middle schools. Legacy Middle School opened in fall 2020.

- Brentwood Middle (1972)
- Discovery Virtual Middle
- Fairview Middle (1981)
- Fred J. Page Middle (1981)
- Grassland Middle (1986)
- Heritage Middle (2001)
- Hillsboro Middle (1905) (k-8)
- Legacy Middle (2020)
- Mill Creek Middle (2016)
- Spring Station Middle (2010)
- Sunset Middle (2006)
- Thompson's Station Middle (2018)
- Woodland Middle (1994)

=== High schools (9-12) ===
WCS operates eleven high schools throughout the district. An additional high school was previously planned for 2022, according to the district's 2017 5-year capital outlay plan; however, the district has since chosen to renovate existing high schools to increase capacity in the short term. The district's 10-year building forecast now calls for a new high school opening in fall 2025.

- Brentwood High (1982)
- Centennial High (1996)
- Fairview High (1956)
- Franklin High (1910)
- Fred J. Page High (1975)
- Independence High (2004)
- Nolensville High (2016)
- Ravenwood High (2002)
- Renaissance High (2014)
- Summit High (2011)
- Vanguard Virtual High

== See also ==
- List of high schools in Tennessee
- List of school districts in Tennessee
