= Nolensville High School =

Coordinates: 35.9425°N 86.6530°W

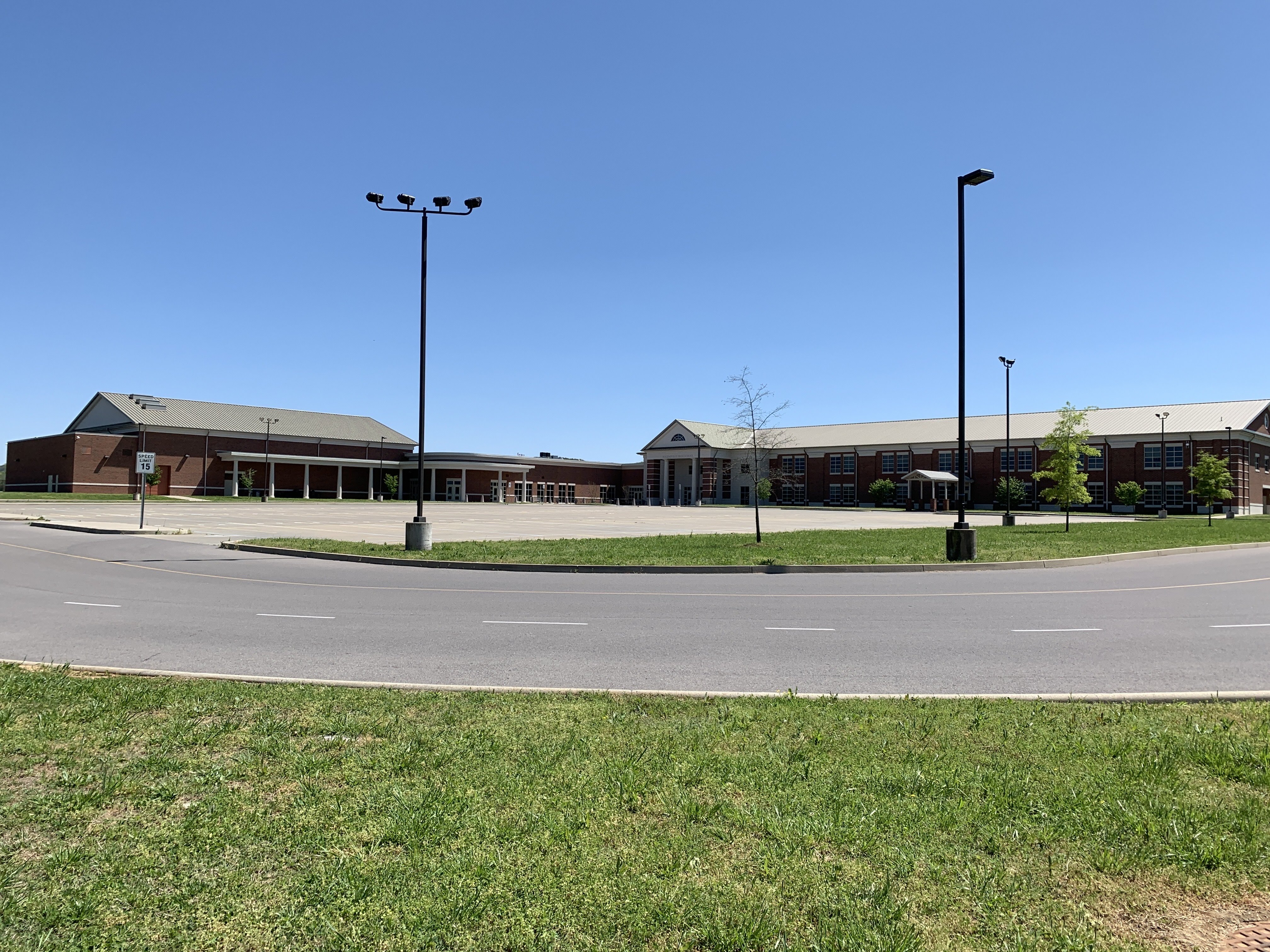

Location
- 1600 Summerlyn Drive; Nolensville, Tennessee 37135; United States

Information
- Type: Public
- Established: 2016
- School district: Williamson County Schools
- Principal: Dr. Jennifer Calvert
- Teaching staff: 79.83 (on an FTE basis)
- Grades: 9–12
- Enrollment: 1,486 (2023-2024)
- Student to teacher ratio: 18.61
- Colors: Royal Blue; Black; Silver
- Team name: Knights
- Accreditation: Southern Association of Colleges and Schools
- Website: www.wcs.edu/nhs

Nolensville High School is a high school in Nolensville, Tennessee. It opened in 2016 with grades 9–10, adding a junior class in 2017 and a senior class in Fall 2018. The school is located in northeastern Williamson County in the expanding town of Nolensville.

== Administration ==
Former Brentwood Middle School principal Bill Harlin was the founding principal of Nolensville High School and held that position until 2021. He was succeeded in the 2021-22 school year by Amy Maffei. Current principal, Dr. Jennifer Calvert, was named head principal in the 2023-24 school year. The school has four assistant principals: Ellen Brown, David Vassar, Brad Blakeley, and Patrick Boyd.

== Athletics ==
Nolensville High School plays in TSSAA's middle grand division and 6th athletic district in baseball, basketball, bowling, cheerleeding, cross country, dance, football, girl's flag football, unified flag football, golf, lacrosse, soccer, softball, tennis, track and field, volleyball, and wrestling as the Knights.

The school holds several individual champion titles for its students, with 3 for girls' cross country, 1 for boys' track and field, 5 for girls' track and field, 3 for wrestling.

Team State Titles
Year	Sport	Class	Award	Details
2019	Girls' Soccer	AA	Runner-Up	(14-4-3)
2019	Girls' Volleyball	AA	Champions	(41-9)
2019	Wrestling	A-AA	Runner-Up	(37-10)
2020	Girls' Volleyball	AA	Champions	(38-4)
2021	Girls' Volleyball	AAA	Champions	(43-4)
2023	Girls' Volleyball	AAA	Runner-Up	(30-16)
2024	Baseball	4A	Runner-Up	(32-10)
2024	Boys' Cross Country	AAA	Runner-Up	
2024	Girls' Volleyball	AAA	Champions	(39-6)
2025	Boys' Lacrosse	AA	Champions	(14-4)
2025	Wrestling	AA	Runner-Up	
