= Ken Frost =

American football player (1938–2021)

No. 79
- Position: Defensive tackle

Personal information
- Born: November 17, 1938; Brentwood, Tennessee
- Died: January 26, 2021 (aged 82); Athens, Alabama
- Listed height: 6 ft 4 in (1.93 m)
- Listed weight: 242 lb (110 kg)

Career information
- High school: Franklin (TN)
- College: Tennessee
- NFL draft: 1961: undrafted

Career history
- Dallas Cowboys (1961–1962); Cleveland Browns (1963)*
- * Offseason or practice squad member only

Awards and highlights
- NFL All-rookie team (1961)

Career NFL statistics
- Games played: 17
- Stats at Pro Football Reference

Carroll Kenneth Frost (November 17, 1938 – January 26, 2021) was an American professional football defensive tackle in the National Football League for the Dallas Cowboys. He played college football at the University of Tennessee.

== Early life ==
Frost attended Franklin High School, before accepting a football scholarship from the University of Tennessee. He was held out from the team as a sophomore. In 1960, his teammates voted him outstanding lineman.

In 1961, he was suspended after not meeting the school's academic requirements and left school before his college eligibility was over to join the NFL.

== Professional career ==
=== Dallas Cowboys ===
Frost was signed as an undrafted free agent by the Dallas Cowboys after the 1961 NFL draft, which at the time was seen as a coup, as his skills were being compared to those of first round draft choice Bob Lilly. Although he was a backup, he was named to the NFL All-rookie team.

He became a starter at defensive tackle in his second season, but suffered torn ligaments in his right knee during the third game against the Los Angeles Rams and was lost for the year. The injury would eventually end his career.

On May 13, 1963, he was traded to the Cleveland Browns in exchange for a third round draft choice (#39-Roger Pillath).

=== Cleveland Browns ===
Frost was waived by the Cleveland Browns on September 3.

== Personal life ==
In 1963, he sued the Dallas Cowboys because of the medical treatment he received for his injured knee.

Frost died on January 26, 2021.
