= Franklin Special School District =

Public school district in Franklin, Tennessee, United States

Franklin Special District

Location
- Franklin, Tennessee United States

District information
- Type: Public
- Grades: K–8
- Superintendent: David Snowden
- Accreditation: AdvancED
- Schools: 8

Students and staff
- Students: 3850
- Athletic conference: Williamson Middle Athletic Association

Other information
- Website: www.fssd.org

Franklin Special District (FSD) is a school district in Franklin, Tennessee, United States. The district includes 3,850 students attending eight schools for grades K–8. After completing eighth grade, students attend a Williamson County Schools high school (Franklin and Centennial).

The boundary includes the majority of Franklin.

== Schools ==
=== Elementary Schools (K–4) ===
- Franklin Elementary
- Johnson Elementary
- Liberty Elementary
- Moore Elementary
- Poplar Grove Elementary

=== Middle Schools (5–8) ===
- Freedom Intermediate (5–6)
- Freedom Middle (7–8)
- Poplar Grove Middle (5–8)
