= Rudderville, Tennessee =

- Unincorporated community
- Location within Tennessee Location within the United States
- Coordinates: 35°50′26″N 86°44′28″W
- Country: United States
- State: Tennessee
- County: Williamson
- Elevation: 738 ft (225 m)
- Time zone: UTC-6 (Central (CST))
  - Summer (DST): UTC-5 (CDT)
- Area code: 615
- GNIS feature ID: 1300236

Rudderville is an unincorporated community near Franklin in Williamson County, Tennessee. It is the location of Fred J. Page High School.
