= Fred Lane (American football) =

American football player (1975–2000)

- Lane running against the New Orleans Saints

No. 32
- Position: Running back

Personal information
- Born: September 6, 1975; Franklin, Tennessee, U.S.
- Died: July 6, 2000 (aged 24); Mecklenburg County, North Carolina, U.S.
- Listed height: 5 ft 10 in (1.78 m)
- Listed weight: 205 lb (93 kg)

Career information
- High school: Franklin (TN)
- College: Lane
- NFL draft: 1997: undrafted

Career history
- Carolina Panthers (1997–1999); Indianapolis Colts (2000)*
- * Offseason or practice squad member only

Career NFL statistics
- Rushing attempts: 502
- Rushing yards: 2,001
- Rushing touchdowns: 13
- Receptions: 43
- Receiving yards: 275
- Stats at Pro Football Reference

Freddie Brown Lane Jr. (September 6, 1975 – July 6, 2000) was an American professional football running back who played in the National Football League (NFL) for the Carolina Panthers.

== Early life ==
Lane was born and raised in Franklin, Tennessee. His father, Fred Lane Sr., was a star at the old Natchez High School, which later desegregated with Franklin High. Attending Franklin Junior High School, it was noticed that Lane possessed uncommon speed and agility for such a young player. Lane attended Franklin High School, amassing over 1,000 yards his senior year, while averaging 7.5 yards per carry. His number, 28, is retired by the school. He had three daughters: Régine Lane, Sable Lane and Pilarr Lane.

== College career ==
Lane attended Lane College in Jackson, Tennessee. He finished his career with 3,612 rushing yards, establishing himself as the school's all-time leading rusher. As of 2012, Lane still held the school records for rushing yards in a career, season (1,853 in 1995) and game (305 versus Miles College), as well as rushing attempts and per carry average. As a junior in 1995, Lane finished the season on the Harlon Hill Trophy watchlist, the NCAA Division II Player of the Year award. In the same year, Lane was named to the Heritage Radio HBCU All American team, as well as several other media services' All American teams. Lane's college number, #6, was retired by Lane College.

== Professional career ==
Pre-draft measurables
| Height | Weight | Arm length | Hand span | 40-yard dash | 10-yard split | 20-yard split | 20-yard shuttle | Vertical jump | Broad jump | Bench press |
|---|---|---|---|---|---|---|---|---|---|---|
| 5 ft 9 5/8 in (1.77 m) | 209 lb (95 kg) | 31 1/8 in (0.79 m) | 8 5/8 in (0.22 m) | 4.75 s | 1.67 s | 2.79 s | 4.18 s | 31.0 in (0.79 m) | 9 ft 8 in (2.95 m) | 19 reps |

Lane was signed as an undrafted free agent by the Panthers before the 1997 NFL season. He had a remarkable rookie season, setting several franchise records, many of which still stand (see below). Though Lane started only about half his games, he led Carolina in rushing attempts, yards, and touchdowns in 1997 and 1998, before the balance of touches tipped towards Tim Biakabutuka in 1999. During his three years with the Panthers, Lane accumulated 2,001 rushing yards (the most in franchise history at the time) and 13 touchdowns.

In 1998, Lane was late for the team's charter plane to Dallas, and was benched as punishment. Later that season, he celebrated a touchdown by grabbing his crotch. The gesture was not seen on national television, but was captured by WBTV in Charlotte. When the Panthers saw it, they benched Lane for the next week's game. Lane also embarrassed himself and the Panthers by putting on another elaborate celebration of a touchdown—in a game where the New York Jets defeated Carolina 48–21.

On April 21, 2000, Lane was traded to the Indianapolis Colts and was set to back up Edgerrin James.

== NFL career statistics ==
| Year | Team | Games | | Rushing | | | | | Receiving | | | | | Fumbles | |
| Year | Team | GP | GS | Att | Yds | Avg | Lng | TD | Rec | Yds | Avg | Lng | TD | Fum | Lost |
|---|---|---|---|---|---|---|---|---|---|---|---|---|---|---|---|
| 1997 | CAR | 13 | 7 | 182 | 809 | 4.4 | 50 | 7 | 8 | 27 | 3.4 | 7 | 0 | 4 | 3 |
| 1998 | CAR | 14 | 11 | 205 | 717 | 3.5 | 31 | 5 | 12 | 85 | 7.1 | 16 | 0 | 4 | 2 |
| 1999 | CAR | 15 | 5 | 115 | 475 | 4.1 | 41 | 1 | 23 | 163 | 7.1 | 23 | 0 | 1 | 1 |
| Career | | 42 | 23 | 502 | 2,001 | 50 | 4.0 | 13 | 43 | 275 | 6.4 | 23 | 0 | 9 | 6 |

=== Franchise records ===
As of 2017 off-season, Lane still held several Panthers records, including:

- Rush attempts, rookie game (34, 1997-12-08 @DAL)
- Rush yards, rookie game (147, 1997-11-02 OAK)
- Rushing touchdowns, rookie game (3, 1997-11-02 OAK; with Cam Newton)
- Total touchdowns, rookie game (3, 1997-11-02 OAK; with Cam Newton)
- Rushing yards per game, rookie season (62.2)
- 100+ yard rushing games, rookie season (4)
- Games with 3+ TDs, rookie season (1; with Cam Newton)

== Death ==
On July 6, 2000, Fred's wife, Deidra Lane, shot and killed him as he was entering their home. His keys were still in the lock, and he had been shot twice with a 12-gauge shotgun, apparently at point-blank range. Deidra pleaded guilty to voluntary manslaughter in 2003.

At her sentencing, prosecutors described Deidra as an abusive woman, who had murdered her husband for life insurance. On the other hand, her defense attorneys claimed that she had killed him in self-defense.

A judge ruled that her actions were intentional and premeditated, saying that she had purposefully shot him a second time after he was already rendered helpless. She was sentenced to 7 years and 11 months in prison.

Deidra received credit for jail time she served while waiting on a federal charge of conspiracy to commit larceny. She pleaded guilty to that charge, and served an additional 4 months for it. She was released from prison on March 3, 2009.

== See also ==
- List of gridiron football players who died during their careers
