= Tyrel Dodson =

American football player (born 1998)

No. 33 – Carolina Panthers
- Position: Linebacker
- Roster status: Active

Personal information
- Born: June 25, 1998 (age 28); Franklin, Tennessee, U.S.
- Listed height: 6 ft 0 in (1.83 m)
- Listed weight: 237 lb (108 kg)

Career information
- High school: Centennial (Franklin)
- College: Texas A&M (2016–2018)
- NFL draft: 2019: undrafted

Career history
- Buffalo Bills (2019–2023); Seattle Seahawks (2024); Miami Dolphins (2024–2025); Carolina Panthers (2026–present)

Career NFL statistics as of 2025
- Total tackles: 379
- Sacks: 11.5
- Forced fumbles: 3
- Fumble recoveries: 3
- Pass deflections: 13
- Interceptions: 4
- Stats at Pro Football Reference

Tyrel Dodson (born June 25, 1998) is an American professional football linebacker for the Carolina Panthers of the National Football League (NFL). He played college football for the Texas A&M Aggies.

== Early life ==
Dodson grew up in Franklin, Tennessee, raised by his single mother Angela, and was rated a 4-star prospect by 24/7 Sports and Rivals after garnering several awards as a high school senior at Centennial High School. He attended college at Texas A&M University, choosing to play for their college football team over other schools such as Arkansas, Kentucky, Missouri, and others. As a freshman in 2016, Dodson recorded 27 tackles, including 1.5 for a loss, and recorded a fumble recovery as a reserve linebacker. He garnered a team-leading 105 tackles as a sophomore, with 11.0 for a loss and 5.5 quarterback sacks in addition to 3 interceptions and 6 pass breakups. After a strong junior year in which he finished third on the team with 61 tackles, Dodson announced that he would forgo his senior year and declare for the NFL draft.

== Professional career ==
Pre-draft measurables
Height	Weight	Arm length	Hand span	Wingspan	40-yard dash	10-yard split	20-yard split	20-yard shuttle	Three-cone drill	Vertical jump	Broad jump	Bench press
6 ft 0 3/8 in (1.84 m)	237 lb (108 kg)	31 3/4 in (0.81 m)	9 1/8 in (0.23 m)	6 ft 3 3/4 in (1.92 m)	4.60 s	1.61 s	2.68 s	4.50 s	7.59 s	35.0 in (0.89 m)	9 ft 10 in (3.00 m)	24 reps
All values from NFL Combine/Pro Day

=== Buffalo Bills ===
Dodson signed with the Buffalo Bills as an undrafted free agent following the 2019 NFL draft. Following an incident in Arizona in which he was arrested and accused of domestic violence, Dodson received a six-game suspension after pleading guilty to misdemeanor disorderly conduct charges. He was later waived and re-signed to the practice squad upon finishing his suspension.

Dodson made his first regular season appearance on September 13, 2020, during a 27–17 win over the New York Jets. He entered in place of starting middle linebacker Tremaine Edmunds, who suffered a shoulder injury, and was himself injured later in the game. Dodson recorded his first career sack during the game, taking down Jets quarterback Sam Darnold. With Edmunds out the following week against the Miami Dolphins, Dodson made his first career start. He was placed on injured reserve on October 24,. Dodson was activated on December 12.

Dodson played in 16 games in the 2021 season and recorded 15 tackles. On February 10, 2022, Dodson signed a one-year contract extension with the Bills.

In the 2022 season, Dodson appeared in 16 games and started three. He finished with one sack, 32 total tackles (22 solo), and one fumble recovery.

On March 14, 2023, Dodson signed another one-year contract extension. He competed for the starting middle linebacker position in the wake of Edmunds' departure in free agency, but lost out to Terrel Bernard, who had missed most of preseason. Despite this, Dodson would be thrust into the starting lineup himself when All-Pro Matt Milano suffered a season-ending leg fracture. Dodson finished the season with 10 starts and a career-high in playing time, with most of his snaps being on run defense. He was also graded as the Bills' most-improved player that season by Pro Football Focus, improving his score to 89.5, the second highest among linebackers league-wide, from a 2022 score of 48.4.

=== Seattle Seahawks ===
On March 14, 2024, Dodson signed with the Seattle Seahawks On July 18, Dodson was placed on the Active/Physically Unable to Perform (PUP) list. On July 23, he was activated from the PUP list after passing his physical. After starting the first nine games of the season, Dodson was waived on November 11, following the Seahawks' bye week. Although Dodson was the Seahawks' leading tackler, head coach Mike Macdonald later told journalists that he felt improvement was possible at the second level of the defense, citing explosive runs that the team had given up. After his release, Dodson told media that he was "pissed off" and that he felt that he "was a leader."

=== Miami Dolphins ===
Dodson was claimed off waivers by the Miami Dolphins on November 12, 2024. In Week 17, Dodson recorded 15 tackles, an interception, and a pass breakup in a 20-3 win over the Cleveland Browns, earning AFC Defensive Player of the Week.

On March 13, 2025, Dodson re-signed with the Dolphins on a two-year, $8.25 million contract. In 2025, Dodson earned a starting role and had a career year, finishing second on the Dolphins in tackles and third in sacks.

On August 30, 2026, Dodson was released by the Dolphins as a part of final roster cuts.

=== Carolina Panthers ===
On September 1, 2026, Dodson was signed to the Carolina Panthers' practice squad. On September 14, he was signed to the active roster.

== Personal life ==
Dodson was the first alumnus from Centennial High School to make it into the NFL. He hosted a football camp for the school in 2021.

== NFL career statistics ==
Legend
**Bold**	Career high

=== Regular season ===
Year	Team	Games		Tackles							Interceptions						Fumbles				
Year	Team	GP	GS	Cmb	Solo	Ast	TFL	QBH	Sck	Sfty	PD	Int	Yds	Y/I	Lng	TD	FF	FR	Yds	Y/R	TD
2019	BUF	suspended / DNP																			
2020	BUF	10	2	22	13	9	2	0	1.0	0	2	0	0	—	0	0	0	0	—	—	0
2021	BUF	16	0	15	10	5	0	0	0.0	0	0	0	0	—	0	0	0	0	—	—	0
2022	BUF	16	3	32	22	10	1	1	1.0	0	0	0	0	—	0	0	0	**1**	0	0.0	0
2023	BUF	17	10	74	57	17	8	**6**	2.5	0	2	0	0	—	0	0	**1**	**1**	0	0.0	0
2024	SEA	9	9	71	41	30	5	3	2.0	0	2	0	0	—	0	0	**1**	0	—	—	0
2024	MIA	8	3	36	18	18	0	1	0.0	0	**4**	**3**	**7**	**2.3**	**7**	0	0	0	—	—	0
2025	MIA	16	16	**129**	**72**	**57**	**10**	**6**	**5.0**	0	3	1	0	0.0	0	0	**1**	**1**	**6**	**6.0**	0
Career		92	43	379	233	146	26	17	11.5	0	13	4	7	1.8	7	0	3	3	6	2.0	0

=== Postseason ===
Year	Team	Games		Tackles							Interceptions						Fumbles				
Year	Team	GP	GS	Cmb	Solo	Ast	TFL	QBH	Sck	Sfty	PD	Int	Yds	Y/I	Lng	TD	FF	FR	Yds	Y/R	TD
2019	BUF	DNP																			
2020	BUF	DNP																			
2021	BUF	2	0	2	1	**1**	0	0	0.0	0	0	0	0	—	0	0	0	0	—	—	0
2022	BUF	2	0	0	0	0	0	0	0.0	0	0	0	0	—	0	0	0	**1**	**-1**	**-1.0**	0
2023	BUF	1	1	**8**	**7**	**1**	**1**	0	0.0	0	0	0	0	—	0	0	0	0	—	—	0
Career		5	1	10	8	2	1	0	0.0	0	0	0	0	—	0	0	0	1	-1	-1.0	0
