= Franklin High School (Tennessee) =

Location
- 810 Hillsboro Road; Franklin, Williamson County, Tennessee 37064; United States; 35.93928°N 86.87803°W

Information
- Type: Public
- Established: 1910; 116 years ago
- School district: Williamson County Schools
- NCES School ID: 470453001805
- Principal: Shane Pantall
- Staff: 106.01 (on an FTE basis)
- Grades: 9–12
- Enrollment: 1,743 (2023-2024)
- Student to teacher ratio: 16.44
- Colors: Maroon and white
- Athletics conference: TSSAA
- Team name: Admirals
- Rival: Centennial High School (Tennessee) Brentwood High School; Centennial High School
- Accreditation: Southern Association of Colleges and Schools
- Feeder schools: Freedom Middle School (FSSD); Grassland Middle School; Poplar Grove Middle School (FSSD)
- Website: fhs.wcs.edu

Franklin High School is a public high school located in Franklin, Tennessee, United States. The school serves the north central section of Williamson County for students in grades 9–12.

The school is accredited by the Southern Association of Colleges and Schools.

== Administration ==
Shane Pantall is the principal of Franklin High effective July 1, 2020. The school has four assistant principals: Edwin Ruth, Jason Eubanks, Sarah Reynolds, and Marlon Ruck.

== History ==
Franklin High School was established in 1910, with 1 teacher and 1 student in an arcade in the Franklin Grammar School, located in the center of Franklin, Tennessee. The first graduating class, the class of 1912, consisted of 3 students. The first principal was Nell Shea. Franklin High School received its own building in 1926, and was located just outside the downtown area on Columbia Avenue. G.E. Craddock served as principal during the move, and brought 10 teachers and a senior class of 33 to the new building.

In 1936, W.C. Yates became principal of Franklin High School. During his tenure, the school was accredited by the Southern Association of Colleges and Schools in 1941, and increased the number of teachers to 13, and the graduating senior class to 53. Daly Thompson became principal in the early 1950s and Barry Sutton became principal in 1955.

In January 1956, the Franklin High School building burned down, leaving only the gym and basement standing. The school moved to local churches while a new building was constructed. The new location, still used today, was on the opposite side of Franklin, and had 19 classrooms. This new building was designed by William Thomas Black, a famous architect in the area. At the new location the staff increased again to 19 teachers, and taught a graduating class of 72. The senior class grew to 184 by 1967, and had 42 staff members. Carl Owen became principal in 1967, but only served for one year. During this year, Franklin High School was integrated and combined with Natchez High School. D.W. Sanders became principal in 1968, and was replaced in 1971 by Carl Pike.

Brentwood High School was opened in 1982, pulling students from Franklin High School. Bob Lawson became principal in 1987, but only served for a year. In 1988, Doug Crosier was named principal, and the school building was renovated. Centennial High School was opened in 1996 to relieve crowding in the growing Franklin area. Dr. John Calton was principal for the 2000-01 school year, and after he resigned, Dr. Linda Miller was principal for a year. In 2002, Willie Dickerson was appointed principal served in the role for nearly 20 years until being promoted to a district-level administrative position.

A new two-story Franklin High School was built between 2004 and 2006 on the site of the previous building. The construction cost $21 million. A ribbon-cutting ceremony and open house was held January 22, 2006.

Franklin celebrated its 100th anniversary throughout the 2009–2010 school year including at its annual Homecoming festivities in October and at a special video presentation in April.

In 2016, WCS began to develop a campus master plan for FHS including improved athletic facilities, a new access road for better vehicle circulation, and expanded classroom facilities, primarily through the acquisition of the former Columbia State Community College Franklin campus, which is located next to the high school. At its March 13 meeting, the Williamson County Commission gave the former college campus to the district and approved $9 million for construction and renovations. The first phase of these campus improvements was completed in January 2018, with the reopening of the former Columbia State building as the Franklin High School Annex. The annex contains 16 traditional classrooms, in addition to science labs, administrative space, and a commons area. The new space can accommodate approximately 500 students.

Franklin class of 1990 graduate Shane Pantall was named principal in 2020, following Dickerson's promotion to WCS executive director of secondary schools.

== Mascot ==
Franklin's original mascot from the school's opening in 1910 was a 6-headed Dragon. In 1937, the mascot was changed to a confederate "rebel" soldier. According to former principal Willie Dickerson, the 1937 annual described the reason for the new mascot at the then-segregated, all-white school saying "there was no animosity of the past ... we uphold these ideals and believe them to be right." Although Franklin kept its mascot as the Rebels until 2020, through the 2010s, the original cartoon of a confederate rebel was slowly phased out of school branding and school apparel. A big white "F" called the "Power F" encompassed by a maroon circle used to symbolize Franklin High School began to replace the cartoon during this time. In July 2020, during the first week of principal Shane Pantall's tenure, a committee was formed to explore whether the school's mascot should be changed. Superintendent Jason Golden accepted the committee's recommendation to change the school's mascot and on August 18, 2020, Pantall announced the new mascot as "the admirals." According to Pantall, "The Admirals was chosen because Franklin High is touted by the students, faculty and alumni as ‘The Flagship’ school of Williamson County and is the oldest high school in the district."

== Academics and testing ==
Franklin High School was the first high school in Tennessee to offer the International Baccalaureate program. The IB program combines a rigorous academic workload with community service hours and an extended essay. The school also offers numerous AP and Honors courses to students to promote academic rigor.

In 2013, the school had an average ACT score of 24.6. That year, 449 students took a combined 794 AP exams, earning an 84% passing rate (score of 3 or better).

Additionally, the school offers career and technical education courses in several areas including digital arts, television and film production, early childhood education, culinary arts, autonomous vehicle coding, criminal justice, marketing, and automotive collision repair.

== Arts ==
Franklin High School offers band, chorus, theatre, and visual arts programs.

=== Band ===
The Franklin Band comprises three concert bands, percussion ensemble, marching band, fall color guard, winter guard, jazz band, and numerous chamber ensembles.

The band is a 2014 recipient of the Sudler Shield, an international award for excellence in marching band. The marching band is a nine-time state champion, winning the governor's cup in 1980, 1981, 2012, 2013, 2015, 2016, 2018, 2024, and 2026. In addition, the group won Bands of America regional championships in 2012 and 2013. The band has been a consistent semifinalist at the BOA Grand National Championships since 2012. In 2015, the band earned 13th place at Grand Nationals, its highest placement to date and the third highest placing Tennessee band ever.

The Franklin High School Band has made appearances over the years in various national parades, including the Orange Bowl Parade (1980, 1983, 1986, and 1991), The Tournament of Roses Parade (1996 and 2026), The Macy's Thanksgiving Day Parade (1989 and 1998), The St. Louis St. Patrick's Day Parade (1990, 1993, and 1994), The Hollywood Christmas Parade (2000 and 2005), and The Tangerine Bowl (2003). The Band also appeared in the Academy Award winning movie "Nashville," a Madonna music video, and the 2014 film "The Secret Handshake."

The Franklin winterguard was founded in 2014. In 2015, the group won the Southeastern Color Guard Circuit class SAA championships and were subsequently promoted to class SA. The Franklin winter guard has won numerous competitions, and in 2020-2021 won the WGI World Championships.

Franklin has had several concert ensembles perform at the Music for All National Festival. Most recently, the percussion ensemble and saxophone quartet performed at the 2017 festival. Previous national festival performances include the wind ensemble and percussion ensemble in 2013 and a chamber ensemble Franklin Winds at the 2015 festival.

== Athletics ==
=== TSSAA-sanctioned sports ===
The below TSSAA-sanctioned teams have won a combined 18 state championships, the second most in Williamson County Schools.

- Baseball
- Boys' basketball: 1989
- Girls' basketball
- Bowling
- Boys' cross country
- boys cheerleading:
- Girls' cross country
- Football
- Boys' golf: 2019
- Girls' golf
- Boys' soccer: 2013, 2014
- Girls' soccer: 1984, 1985, 1986, 1987, 1989, 1990, 1991, 1992, 1993, 2000, 2002, 2003, 2011
- Softball
- Boys' tennis
- Girls' tennis
- Boys' track
- Girls' track
- Volleyball
- Wrestling: 1989
- E-Sports

=== Club sports ===
In addition to TSSAA sports, the school also has numerous club sports with the following state titles:

- Cheerleading
  - Varsity: 2006, 2009, 2011, 2012, 2020, 2021
  - Junior Varsity
- Dance (junior varsity jazz): 2011, 2012
- Hockey
- Boys' lacrosse: 2002, 2006, 2007
- Girls' lacrosse
- Swimming & Diving

These sports have a combined 9 state championships, which gives Franklin a total of 27 state championships.

== Notable alumni ==
- Ken Frost, former NFL defensive tackle (class of 1956)
- Will Hoge, musician
- Caleb Joseph, MLB catcher, Baltimore Orioles (class of 2005)
- Corban Joseph, baseball infielder (class of 2008)
- Ashley Judd, actress (class of 1986)
- Wynonna Judd, country music singer
- Fred Lane, former NFL running back (class of 1993)
- Bill Lee, Tennessee governor
- Darris McCord, former NFL player and 1 time Pro Bowler (class of 1950)
- Andy Ogles, U.S. Representative from Tennessee
- Brandon Ogles, state legislator (class of 1995)
- Dustin Ortiz, wrestler; current mixed martial artist in the Ultimate Fighting Championship
- Kesha Rose Sebert, singer-songwriter
- Derrick Turnbow, MLB pitcher
- Taylor Ware, Yodeler, Finalist in America's Got Talent 2006, Winner of a Guinness World Record
- Hank Williams III, musician and son of Hank Williams Jr.
- Garrison Mathews, NBA Player for the Houston Rockets (class of 2015)
- Brandi Cyrus, actress and DJ
- Clay Grider, author and J.V. hockey player
