= Centennial High School (Tennessee) =

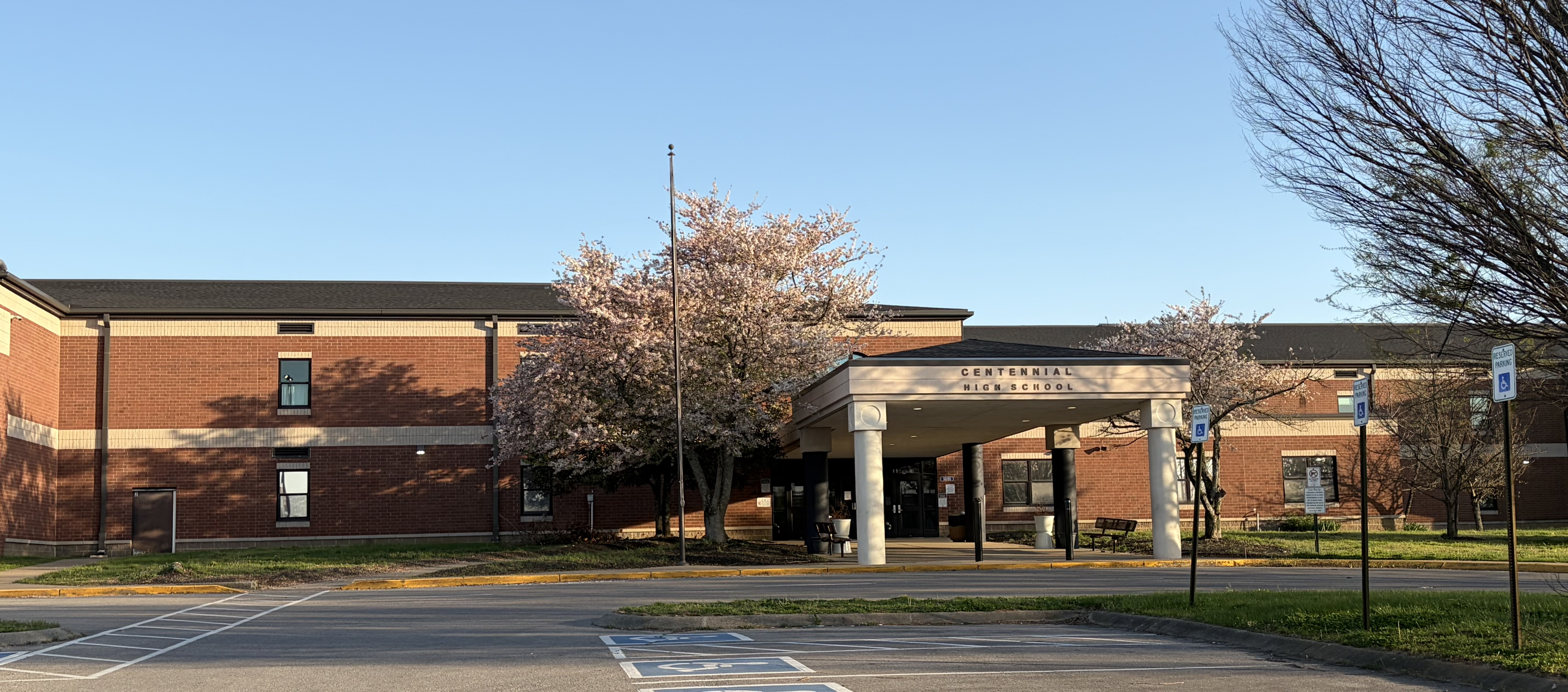
- Centennial High School in 2026

Location
- 5050 Mallory Lane; Franklin, Williamson County, Tennessee 37067; United States; 35.93026°N 86.82247°W

Information
- Type: Public
- Established: 1996
- School district: Williamson County Schools
- Principal: Kevin Dyson
- Staff: 86.52 (FTE)
- Grades: 9–12
- Enrollment: 1,389 (2023-2024)
- Student to teacher ratio: 16.05
- Colors: Navy, Carolina Blue, and Silver
- Athletics conference: TSSAA
- Nickname: Cougars
- Accreditation: Southern Association of Colleges and Schools
- Newspaper: The Cougar Chronicle
- Website: chs.wcs.edu

Centennial High School is a public high school located in Franklin, Tennessee, United States. The school serves the central section of Williamson County for students in grades 9–12.

The school is accredited by the Southern Association of Colleges and Schools.

== History ==
The school opened in 1996 to relieve overcrowding at nearby Franklin High School.

In 2014, a new 500-seat performing arts center was constructed. The new auditorium includes dressing rooms and set storage space and was built as part of a multi-phase project that called for building auditoriums at all Williamson County middle and high schools.

== Academics and testing ==
In 2016, Centennial had its highest graduation rate to date: 95 percent. The average ACT score was a 21.9, with 83 percent of the graduates planning on attending a four-year college. The school offers 23 Advanced Placement courses. In 2016, 491 students took a combined 906 AP exams.

== Arts ==
=== Band/Orchestra ===
The Centennial band program comprises a fall marching band, winter color guard and percussion units, concert ensembles, and a jazz band. Centennial also offers orchestra and guitar classes during the school day.

=== Choir ===
The Centennial Chamber Choir has performed with the Nashville Symphony, Foreigner, and at Walt Disney World. In fall 2016, the vocal music department produced and released a Christmas album. The cds were sold for $10 each as a fundraiser.

=== Theatre ===
The Centennial Theatre program operates under the name Center Stage Productions. Each year, the crew produces a fall play and a spring musical. The theatre program also sponsors a chapter of the International Thespian Society, an honor society for theatre students.

== Special programs ==
=== WIT Center ===
Williamson's Information Technology Center of Excellence at Centennial High School launched in fall 2014. The center is part of a collaboration between Williamson County Schools and Columbia State Community College.

The center includes classes in networking, computer programming, web development, application design for both computers and mobile devices, and robotics. Students enrolled in these classes earn college credit for the courses in addition to credits toward high school graduation.

=== Cosmetology Center ===
Centennial is the only Williamson County high school that offers a cosmetology program. Students earn class credit that can be transferred to several cosmetology schools in the southeast. Additionally, students can accrue state board hours for post-secondary credit.

== Athletics ==
=== TSSAA-sanctioned sports ===
Centennial offers the following TSSAA-sanctioned teams.

- Baseball
- Boys' basketball
- Girls' basketball
- Bowling
- Boys' cross country
- Girls' cross country
- Football: 2015 and 2016 Region Champions
- Boys' golf
- Girls' golf
- Boys' soccer: 2010 state champion runner-up
- Girls' soccer
- Softball
- Boys' tennis
- Girls' tennis
- Boys' track
- Girls' track
- Volleyball
- Wrestling

=== Club Sports ===
In addition to TSSAA sports, the school also has numerous club sports. Years in bold indicate state championships. Years in italics indicate state runners-up.

- Clay target
- Cheerleading
  - Varsity: **2001**, **2002**, 2003, **2004**, **2008**, 2009, **2010**, 2011, **2012**, **2014**, **2015**, **2016**
  - Junior Varsity: 2002, 2009, **2011**, 2012, 2013, 2016
- Dance
- Hockey: **2001**, **2014**
- Boys' lacrosse: **2002** (co-op team with Franklin)
- Girls' lacrosse
- Swimming

Centennial previously fielded a rugby team, but that team is currently inactive. These sports have a combined 13 state championships.

== Notable alumni ==
- Russell Dickerson, singer-songwriter (class of 2005)
- Curtis Steele, former professional football player for the Toronto Argonauts (class of 2005)
- Kelsea Ballerini, singer-songwriter (class of 2011)
- Tony Kemp, former Major League Baseball player (class of 2010)
- Tyrel Dodson, professional football linebacker for the Miami Dolphins (class of 2016)
