= Thomas Welch (American football) =

American football player (born 1987)

No. 66, 72
- Position: Offensive tackle

Personal information
- Born: June 19, 1987 (age 39); Deltona, Florida, U.S.
- Listed height: 6 ft 6 in (1.98 m)
- Listed weight: 300 lb (136 kg)

Career information
- High school: Brentwood (Brentwood, Tennessee)
- College: Vanderbilt
- NFL draft: 2010: 7th round, 208th overall pick

Career history
- New England Patriots (2010)*; Minnesota Vikings (2010); New England Patriots (2011); Buffalo Bills (2011)*; St. Louis Rams (2011); Philadelphia Eagles (2012)*; Buffalo Bills (2012–2013); New Orleans Saints (2014)*
- * Offseason or practice squad member only

Career NFL statistics
- Games played: 27
- Games started: 1
- Stats at Pro Football Reference

Dwayne Thomas Welch Jr. (born June 19, 1987) is an American former professional football player who was an offensive tackle in the National Football League (NFL). He was selected by the New England Patriots in the seventh round of the 2010 NFL draft. He played college football for the Vanderbilt Commodores. He was also a member of the Minnesota Vikings, Buffalo Bills, St. Louis Rams, Philadelphia Eagles and New Orleans Saints.

== Early life ==
Welch attended Brentwood High School in Brentwood, Tennessee, where he played quarterback.

== College career ==
Following high school, Welch played football at Vanderbilt University, where he redshirted as a tight end in 2005. As a freshman in 2006, Welch moved to offensive tackle early in the season after injuries to the team's starting tackles and played in seven games. In 2007, Welch was the team's top offensive tackle reserve and also played on special teams, earning the team's Specialist of the Week award against Kentucky. As a junior in 2008, Welch started all 13 games at right tackle, earning the team's Offensive Player of the Week award against South Carolina. In 2009, his senior season, Welch started 11 games at left tackle and twice earned Offensive Player of the Week Award honors. While at Vanderbilt, Welch played with other NFL players such as D.J. Moore, Jonathan Goff, Chris Williams, and Myron Lewis.

== Professional career ==
Pre-draft measurables
Height	Weight	Arm length	Hand span	40-yard dash	10-yard split	20-yard split	20-yard shuttle	Three-cone drill	Vertical jump	Broad jump	Bench press
6 ft 6 1/3 in (1.99 m)	307 lb (139 kg)	33 1/4 in (0.84 m)	9 1/2 in (0.24 m)	5.42 s	1.78 s	3.06 s	4.80 s	7.67 s	29 in (0.74 m)	8 ft 9 in (2.67 m)	29 reps
All values from NFL Scouting Combine.

=== New England Patriots (first stint) ===
Welch was selected by the New England Patriots in the seventh round (208th overall) of the 2010 NFL draft. He signed a four-year contract on June 4. He was waived during final cuts on September 4, 2010.

=== Minnesota Vikings ===
Welch was offered a chance to be on the Patriots' practice squad, but later joined the Minnesota Vikings' practice squad on September 6, 2010. He was later activated to the 53-man roster for the final three weeks of the season, once Steve Hutchinson was placed on IR.

=== New England Patriots (second stint) ===
The Patriots signed Welch to their practice squad on September 5, 2011. He was signed to the active roster on September 12, 2011. He was released on September 14, 2011. Welch was added back to the practice squad on September 15.

=== St. Louis Rams ===
After being added to the Buffalo Bills' practice squad in November, the St. Louis Rams signed him on November 22, 2011. He was waived on May 3, 2012.

=== Philadelphia Eagles ===
Welch was claimed off waivers by the Philadelphia Eagles on May 4, 2012.

== Personal life ==
In the off season of 2013, Welch completed an internship at Merrill Lynch in Private Wealth Management. He made an appearance on MONEY with Melissa on the Fox Business Network on May 29, 2013, where he discussed the internship and the NFL's involvement with player development in post football careers. Following this interview, Welch was named to Business Insider's Top 36 Football Players on Wall Street.
