= Independence High School (Tennessee) =

Location
- 1776 Declaration Way; Thompson's Station, Tennessee 37179; United States; 35°49′30″N 86°53′28″W

Information
- Funding type: Public school
- Established: 2004
- School district: Williamson County Schools
- NCES District ID: 4704530
- CEEB code: 430706
- NCES School ID: 470453002096
- Principal: Nikki Patton
- Teaching staff: 117.81 (FTE)
- Grades: 9–12
- Enrollment: 2,097 (2023–2024)
  - Grade 9: 546
  - Grade 10: 511
  - Grade 11: 551
  - Grade 12: 489
- Student to teacher ratio: 17.80
- Campus: Rural: Fringe
- Colors: Forest Green, Navy Blue and Gold
- Mascot: Indy the Eagle
- Nickname: Eagles
- Website: www.wcs.edu/ihs

Independence High School is a 9–12 public high school in Thompson's Station, Tennessee. It is one of several high schools in the Williamson County Schools district.

== History ==
The school opened in 2004, initially with only a freshman and sophomore class. The junior class was added in the second year and the senior class in the third. The first class of seniors graduated on May 26, 2007. The second class, which was the first to complete all 4 years at Independence, graduated May 24, 2008. The school once had approximately 2000 students, but after the creation of nearby high schools, student enrollment has decreased significantly.

== Administration ==
Marilyn Webb was the first principal of Independence High from 2004 to 2008. She was replaced by Todd Campbell the summer of 2008. Campbell resigned in May 2016 and Niki Patton was named the new principal later that month.

== Athletics ==
=== TSSAA-sanctioned sports ===
The below TSSAA-sanctioned teams have won a combined 4 state championships.

- Baseball
- Boys' basketball 2024
- Girls' basketball
- Bowling
- Boys' cross country
- Girls' cross country
- Football: 2015
- Boys' golf
- Girls' golf: 2005
- Boys' soccer
- Girls' soccer
- Softball
- Boys' tennis
- Girls' tennis
- Boys' track
- Girls' track
- Volleyball: 2008
- Wrestling

=== Club sports ===
Additionally, IHS competes in several non-TSSAA club sports: hockey, ultimate frisbee, lacrosse, rugby, and swimming. Several of these club sports are joint ventures with other nearby schools.

== Activities ==
=== Forensics ===
The speech and debate team is in both the National Forensic League and the Tennessee High School Speech and Drama League. They compete throughout Tennessee and consistently place in the State Championship tournament in a variety of events. The team qualified students for the National Forensic League national competition in both 2009 and 2011. Independence Debate made its debut on the national debate circuit in January 2012 at Emory University's Barkley Forum.

== Notable people ==
- Luke Benward — actor
- Rashaan Gaulden — NFL defensive back
- Robert Hassell — MLB baseball player
