= Thompson's Station, Tennessee =

- Town
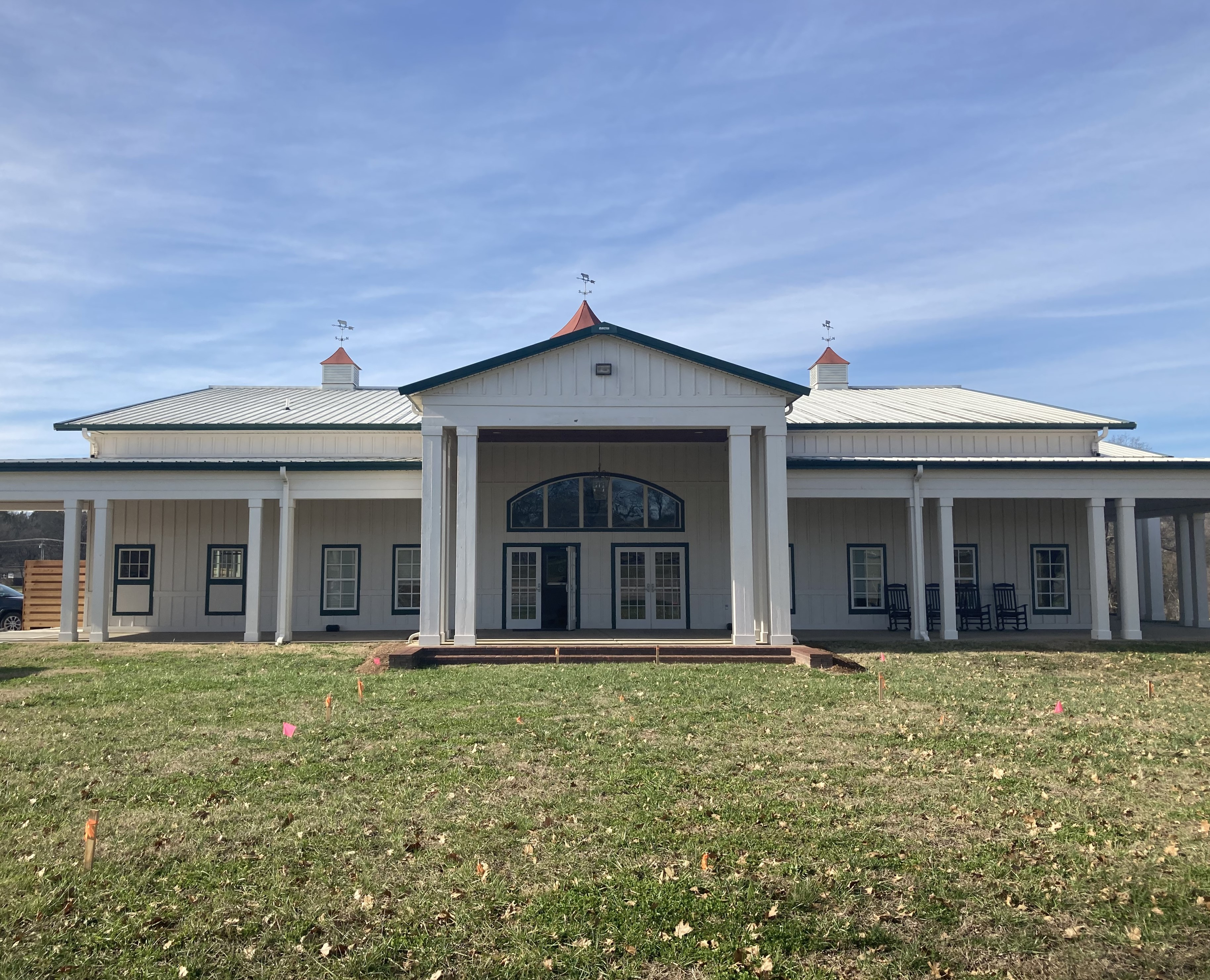
- Thompson's Station Town Hall

- Flag Seal
- Nickname: The Town
- Location of Thompson's Station in Williamson County, Tennessee

- Location within Tennessee Location within the United States
- Coordinates: 35°47′55″N 86°54′26″W
- Country: United States
- State: Tennessee
- County: Williamson
- Settled: 1780
- Incorporated: 1990
- Named for: Dr. Elijah Thompson, early settler

Government
  - Mayor: Brian Stover

Area
  - Total: 22.80 sq mi (59.06 km^{2})
  - Land: 22.79 sq mi (59.03 km^{2})
  - Water: 0.012 sq mi (0.03 km^{2})
- Elevation: 801 ft (244 m)

Population (2020)
  - Total: 7,485
  - Density: 328/sq mi (126.8/km^{2})
- Time zone: UTC-6 (Central (CST))
  - Summer (DST): UTC-5 (CDT)
- ZIP code: 37179
- Area code: 615
- FIPS code: 47-73900
- GNIS feature ID: 1652469
- Website: thompsons-station.gov

Thompson's Station is a town in Williamson County, Tennessee. The population has grown from 2,194 at the 2010 Census to 7,485 in the 2020 Census. Locations in Thompson's Station listed on the U.S. National Register of Historic Places include the Jacob Critz House and the Thomas L. Critz House, Thompson's Station Bank, John Neely House, James P. Johnson House, Homestead Manor and James Giddens House.

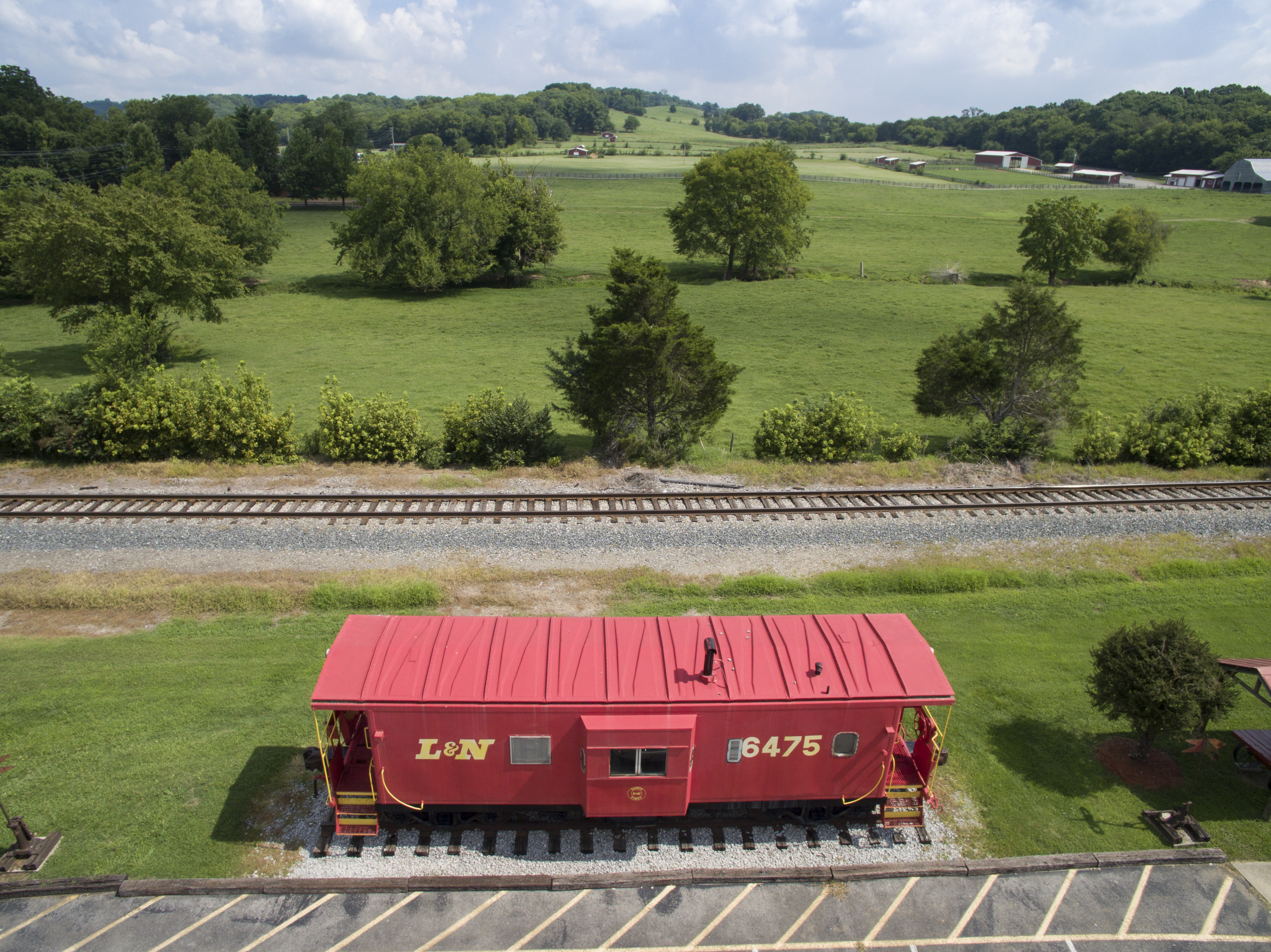
Thompson's Station Caboose

== History ==
The first settlers arrived in what is now Thompson's Station in the late 18th century. The community was originally known as "White House," but changed its name to "Littlebury" in 1836. After the arrival of the railroad in 1855, Dr. Elijah Thompson donated land for a town and train station, and the community was renamed for him.

On March 5, 1863, during the Civil War, the Battle of Thompson's Station was fought, with Confederate forces led by General Earl Van Dorn defeating Union forces under Colonel John Coburn.

== Geography ==
Thompson's Station is located at 35°47′55″N 86°54′26″W (35.798670, -86.907341). It is approximately 25 miles (40 km) south of Nashville, just south of Franklin, and just north of Spring Hill.

The Town includes several parks that encompass over 200 acres (81 ha):

== Government ==
The community voted to incorporate in August 1990 with resident David Lee Coleman chosen as the first mayor. The community elects four at-large aldermen and a mayor who meet monthly at Board of Mayor and Aldermen meetings. Two aldermen are elected every two years with the mayoral election every four years.

In early 2015, the Town embarked on a city planning process to update the zoning regulations. After gathering public input, the Town worked with planning consultants to create the Land Development Ordinance that went on to receive the Driehaus Award's Honorable Mention for form-based code in 2016.

== Demographics ==
Historical population
Census	Pop.	Note	%±
1880	135		—
2000	1,283		—
2010	2,194		71.0%
2020	7,485		241.2%
2025 (est.)	9,469	▲	26.5%
Sources: 2020

=== 2020 census ===
Thompson's Station racial composition
Race	Number	Percentage
White (non-Hispanic)	6,438	86.01%
Black or African American (non-Hispanic)	191	2.55%
Native American	15	0.2%
Asian	126	1.68%
Pacific Islander	5	0.07%
Other/Mixed	313	4.18%
Hispanic or Latino	397	5.3%

As of the 2020 United States census, there were 7,485 people, 1,911 households, and 1,468 families residing in the town.

=== 2000 census ===
As of the census of 2000, there were 1,283 people, 447 households, and 375 families residing in the town. The population density was 87.2 inhabitants per square mile (33.7/km^{2}). There were 473 housing units at an average density of 32.2 units per square mile (12.4 units/km^{2}). The racial makeup of the town was 91.19% White, 7.01% African American, 0.16% Native American, 0.55% Asian, 0.62% from other races, and 0.47% from two or more races. Hispanic or Latino of any race were 2.57% of the population.

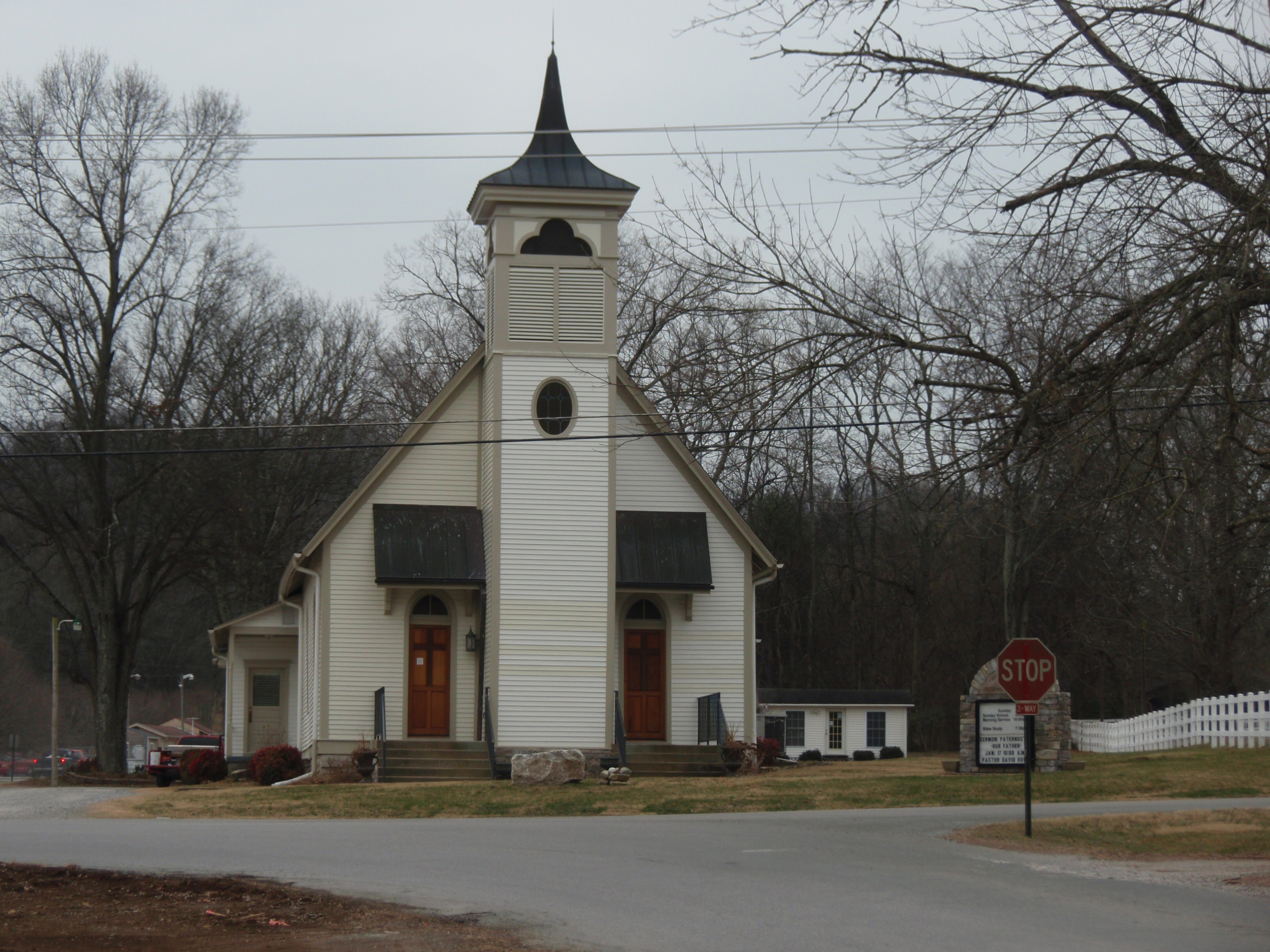
Thompson's Station United Methodist Church

There were 447 households, out of which 40.0% had children under the age of 18 living with them, 75.2% were married couples living together, 6.9% had a female householder with no husband present, and 15.9% were non-families. 14.1% of all households were made up of individuals, and 4.7% had someone living alone who was 65 years of age or older. The average household size was 2.87 and the average family size was 3.17.

In the town, the population was spread out, with 26.8% under the age of 18, 6.3% from 18 to 24, 31.0% from 25 to 44, 26.8% from 45 to 64, and 9.0% who were 65 years of age or older. The median age was 38 years. For every 100 females, there were 102.4 males. For every 100 females age 18 and over, there were 96.4 males.

The median income for a household in the town was $66,875, and the median income for a family was $70,568. Males had a median income of $50,337 versus $31,528 for females. The per capita income for the town was $24,143. About 4.1% of families and 4.4% of the population were below the poverty line, including 5.3% of those under age 18 and 12.6% of those age 65 or over.

A special census was taken by the Town in November 2013, and the new census of 2,681 residents was certified by the State of Tennessee on June 30, 2014. No demographic data was obtained in this census. Due to quick growth, another special census was taken in October 2016 with a newly certified population of 4,726.

The 2020 Federal Census population results for Thompson's Station show the Town has grown to 7,485 residents.

== Education ==
Thompson's Station Public Schools are part of Williamson County Schools. Independence High School serves students in grades nine to twelve.
