= Williamson County, Tennessee =

County in Tennessee, United States

- County
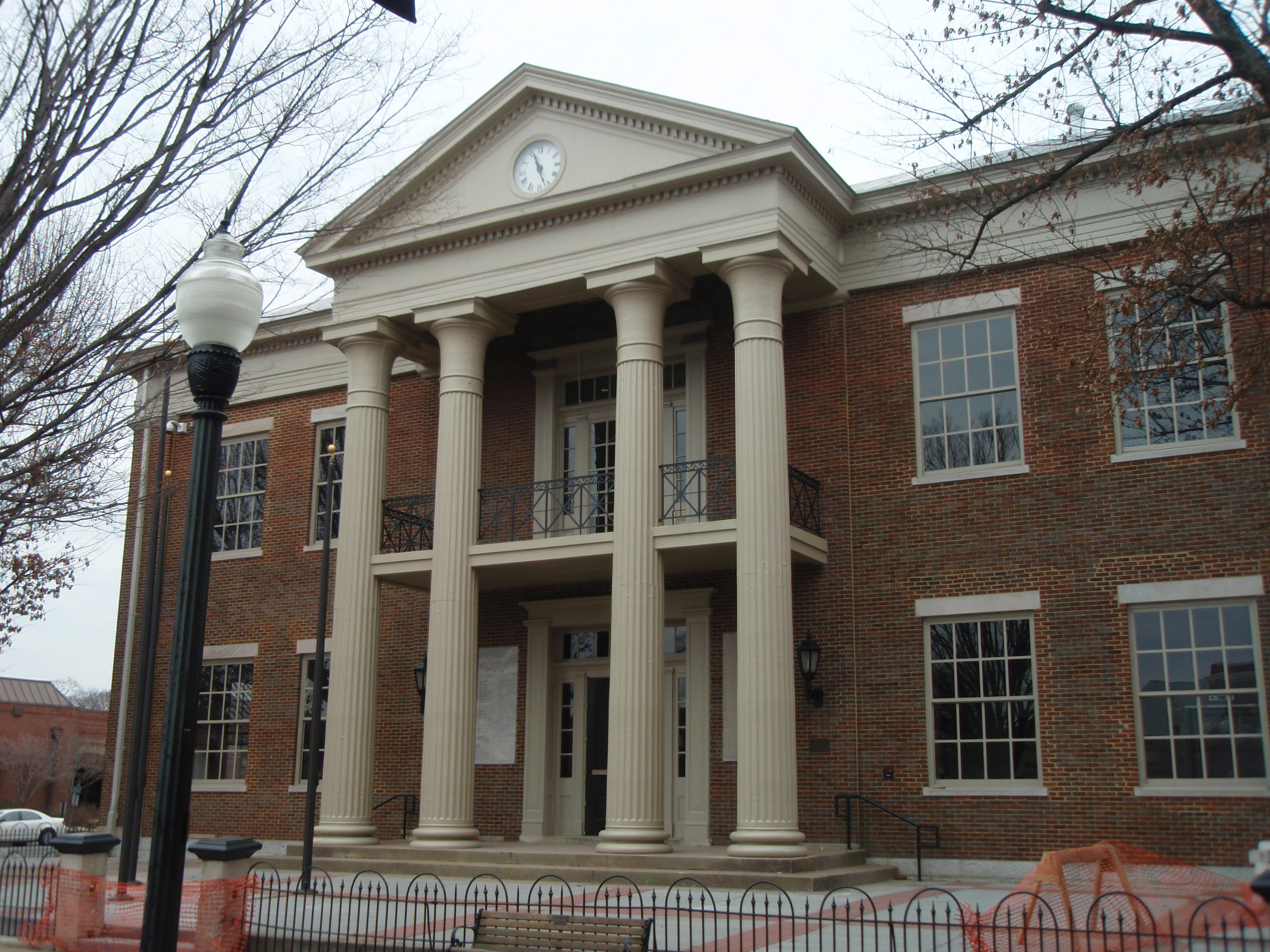
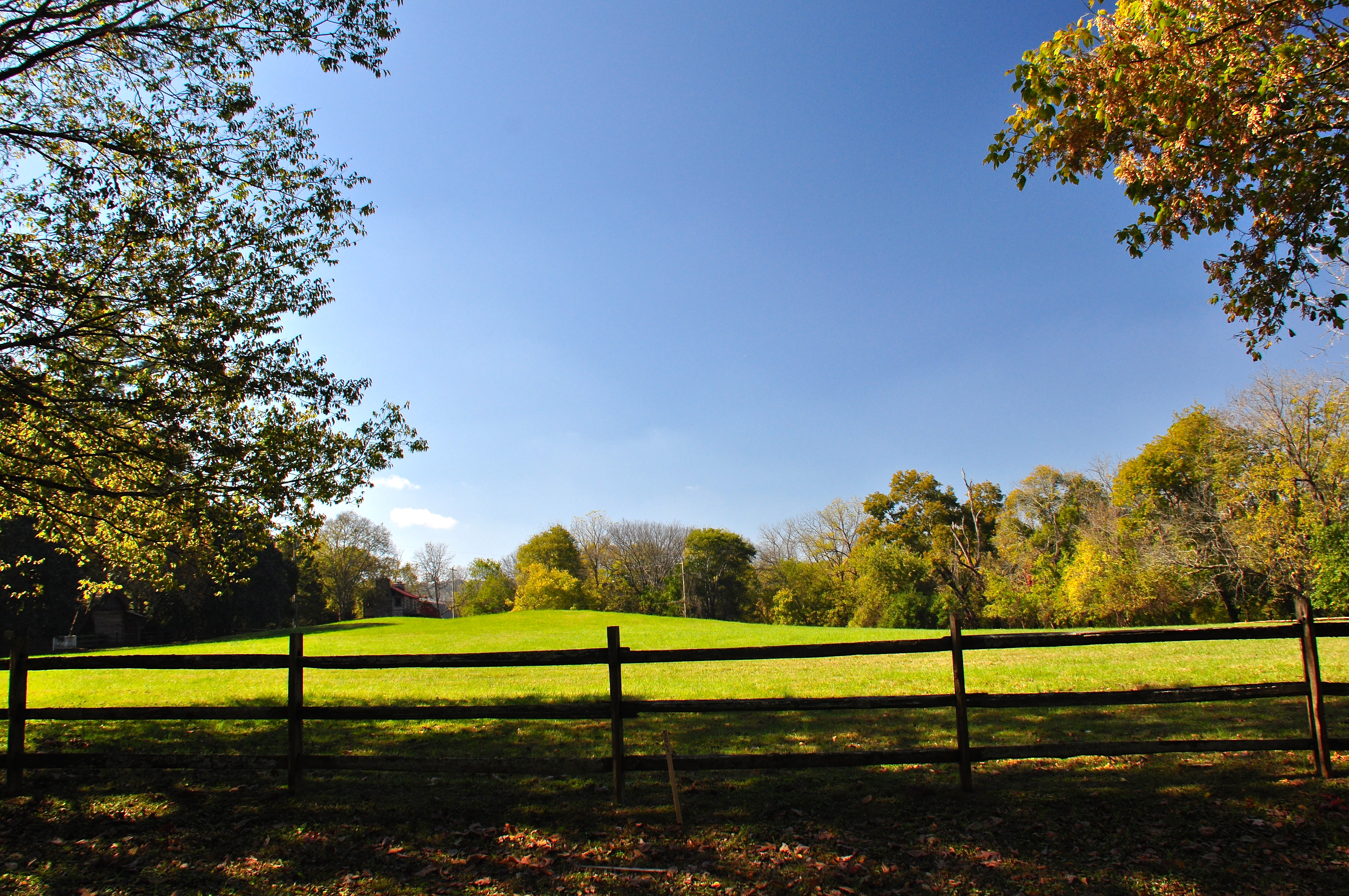
- Williamson County Courthouse in Franklin, Old Town Archeological Site on the western side of the Big Harpeth River

- Flag Seal

- Location within the U.S. state of Tennessee
- Coordinates: 35°53′N 86°54′W
- Country: United States
- State: Tennessee
- Founded: October 26, 1799
- Named for: Hugh Williamson
- Seat: Franklin
- Largest city: Franklin

Government
  - Mayor: Rogers Anderson (R)

Area
  - Total: 584 sq mi (1,510 km^{2})
  - Land: 583 sq mi (1,510 km^{2})
  - Water: 1.2 sq mi (3.1 km^{2}) 0.2%

Population (2020)
  - Total: 247,726
  - Estimate (2025): 272,061 ▲
  - Density: 425/sq mi (164/km^{2})
- Time zone: UTC−6 (Central)
  - Summer (DST): UTC−5 (CDT)
- Area code: 615, 629
- Congressional districts: 7th, 5th
- Website: williamsoncounty-tn.gov

Williamson County is a county in the U.S. state of Tennessee. As of the 2020 United States census, the population was 247,726. The county seat is Franklin, and the county is located in Middle Tennessee. The county is named after Hugh Williamson, a North Carolina politician who signed the U.S. Constitution. Williamson County is part of the Nashville-Davidson–Murfreesboro–Franklin, TN Metropolitan Statistical Area. In the 19th century, tobacco and hemp were cultivated here, and planters also raised warm-blooded livestock, including horses and cattle.

Williamson County is ranked as the wealthiest county in Tennessee, as well as among the wealthiest counties in the country.

== History ==
=== Pre-Civil War ===
The Tennessee General Assembly created Williamson County on October 26, 1799, from a portion of Davidson County. This territory had long been inhabited by at least five Native American cultures, including the Cherokee, Chickasaw, Choctaw, Creek, and Shawnee. It is home to two Mississippian-period mound complexes, the Fewkes site and the Old Town site, built by people of a culture dated to about 1000 CE, which preceded such historic tribes.

European-American settlers arrived in the area by 1798, after the Revolutionary War. Fur traders had preceded them. Scots traders had intermarried with Native American women and had families with them. Both sides thought these relationships could benefit them. Most of the settlers were migrants from Virginia and North Carolina, part of a western movement across the Appalachian Mountains after the American Revolutionary War. Others came after living for a generation in Kentucky. Many brought slaves with them to cultivate the labor-intensive tobacco crops, as well as to care for livestock.

In 1800, Abram Maury laid out Franklin, the county seat, which was carved out of a land grant he had purchased from Major Anthony Sharp. "The county was named in honor of Dr. Hugh Williamson of North Carolina, who had been a colonel in the North Carolina militia and had served three terms in the Continental Congress."

Many of the county's early inhabitants were veterans who had been paid in land grants after the Revolutionary War. Many veterans chose not to settle in the area and sold large sections of their land grants to speculators. These in turn subdivided the land and sold off smaller lots. In the antebellum years, the county was the second-wealthiest in the state. As part of the Middle Tennessee region, it had resources of rich soil, which planters developed with slaves for a diversity of crops including rye, corn, oats, tobacco, hemp, potatoes, wheat, peas, barley, and hay. This diversity, plus timber resources, helped create a stable economy, as opposed to reliance on one cash crop. Slavery was an integral part of the local economy. By 1850, planters and smaller slaveholders in the county held 13,000 enslaved African Americans, who made up nearly half the population of more than 27,000 (see table below).

=== Civil War ===
Williamson County was severely affected by the war. Three battles were fought in the county: the Battle of Brentwood, the Battle of Thompson's Station, and the Battle of Franklin, which had some of the highest fatalities of the war. The large plantations that were part of the county's economic foundation were ravaged, and many of the county's youth were killed. Many Confederate casualties of the Battle of Franklin were buried in the McGavock Confederate Cemetery near the Carnton plantation house. Containing the bodies of 1,481 soldiers, it is the largest private Confederate cemetery in America.

=== Post-Reconstruction to present ===
The county continued to be agricultural and rural into the early 1900s. "Most residents were farmers who raised corn, wheat, cotton and livestock."

In the post-Reconstruction era and the early 20th century, white violence against African Americans increased in an effort to assert dominance. Five African Americans were lynched by white mobs in Williamson County. Among them was Amos Miller, a 23-year-old black man taken from the courtroom during his 1888 trial as a suspect in a sexual assault case, and hanged from the balcony of the county courthouse. The sexual assault victim was a 50-year-old woman. In 1924, 15-year-old Samuel Smith was lynched in Nolensville for shooting and wounding a white grocer. He was taken from a Nashville hospital by a mob and brought back to the town to be murdered. He was the last recorded lynching victim in the Nashville area.

Numerous blacks left Williamson County from 1880 through 1950 as part of the Great Migration to industrial cities in the North and Midwest for work and to escape Jim Crow oppression and violence. County population did not surpass its 1880 level until 1970, when it began to develop suburban housing in response to growth in Nashville.

One of the first major manufacturers to establish operations in the county was the Dortch Stove works, which opened a factory in Franklin. The factory was later developed as a Magic Chef factory, producing electric and gas ranges. (Magic Chef was prominent in the Midwest from 1929.) When the factory was closed due to extensive restructuring in the industry, the structure fell into disuse. The factory complex was restored in the late 1990s in an adaptation for offices, restaurants, retail and event spaces. It is considered a "model historic preservation adaptive reuse project."

The completion of the Interstate Highway System contributed to Nashville's rapid expansion in the mid-20th century, stimulating tremendous population growth in Williamson County. As residential suburban population has increased, the formerly rural county has invested in infrastructure and schools, and its character is rapidly changing. Between 1990 and 2000, the county's population increased 56.3 percent, mostly in the northern part, including Franklin and Brentwood. As of census estimates in 2012, Franklin has more than 66,000 residents (a five-fold increase since 1980), and is the eighth-largest city in the state. Its residents are affluent, with a high median income. The southern part of the county is still primarily rural and used for agriculture. Spring Hill is a growing city in this area. In addition, Williamson County's overall affluence is also due to an abundance of musicians and celebrities with part-time or full-time residences in it.

== Geography ==
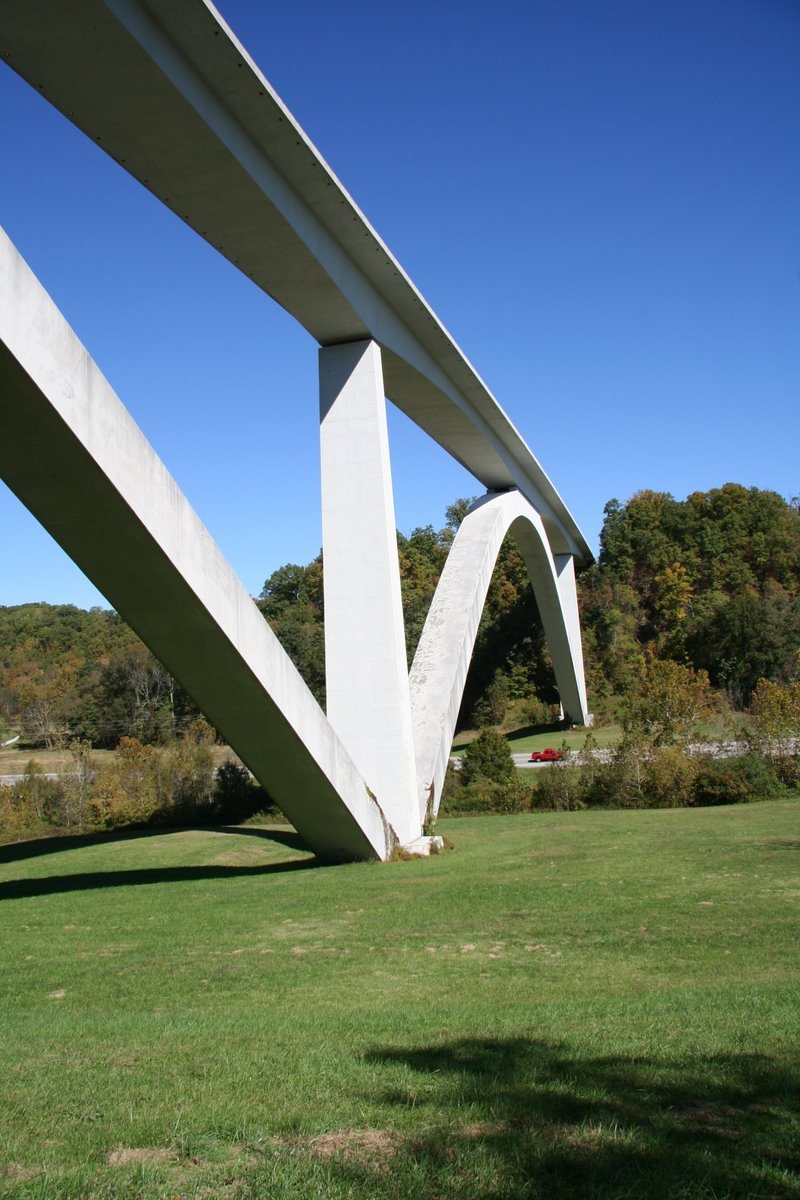
Natchez Trace Parkway Bridge

According to the U.S. Census Bureau, the county has a total area of 584 square miles (1,510 km^{2}), of which 582.8 square miles (1,509 km^{2}) is land and 1.2 square miles (3.1 km^{2}) (0.2%) is water. The Harpeth River and its tributary, the Little Harpeth River, are the county's primary streams.

=== Adjacent counties ===
- Davidson County (north)
- Rutherford County (east)
- Marshall County (southeast)
- Maury County (south)
- Hickman County (southwest)
- Dickson County (northwest)
- Cheatham County (north)

=== National protected area ===
- Natchez Trace Parkway

=== State protected areas ===
- Carter House State Historic Site
- Haley-Jaqueth Wildlife Management Area

== Demographics ==
The county population decreased from a high in 1880 over most of the next several decades, due in large part to African Americans moving to towns and cities for work, or out of the area altogether. The oppression of Jim Crow and related violence and the decline in the need for farm labor in the early 20th century, as mechanization was adopted, resulted in many blacks leaving Tennessee for industrial cities of the North and Midwest in the Great Migration.

The total 1880 county population was not surpassed until 1970. Combined with the rapid increase in white newcomers in new suburban developments in the county since the late 20th century, African Americans now constitute a small minority.

Historical population
Census	Pop.	Note	%±
1800	2,868		—
1810	13,153		358.6%
1820	20,640		56.9%
1830	26,638		29.1%
1840	27,006		1.4%
1850	27,201		0.7%
1860	23,827		−12.4%
1870	25,328		6.3%
1880	28,313		11.8%
1890	26,321		−7.0%
1900	26,429		0.4%
1910	24,213		−8.4%
1920	23,409		−3.3%
1930	22,845		−2.4%
1940	25,220		10.4%
1950	24,307		−3.6%
1960	25,267		3.9%
1970	34,330		35.9%
1980	58,108		69.3%
1990	81,021		39.4%
2000	126,638		56.3%
2010	183,182		44.7%
2020	247,726		35.2%
2025 (est.)	272,061	▲	9.8%
U.S. Decennial Census; 1790–1960 1900–1990; 1990–2000 2010–2020

=== Racial and ethnic composition ===
Williamson County, Tennessee – Racial and ethnic composition Note: the US Census treats Hispanic/Latino as an ethnic category. This table excludes Latinos from the racial categories and assigns them to a separate category. Hispanics/Latinos may be of any race.
Race / ethnicity (NH = Non-Hispanic)	Pop 1980	Pop 1990	Pop 2000	Pop 2010	Pop 2020	% 1980	% 1990	% 2000	% 2010	% 2020
White alone (NH)	52,407	74,519	114,177	158,769	200,408	90.19%	91.97%	90.16%	86.67%	80.90%
Black or African American alone (NH)	5,112	5,378	6,543	7,828	9,709	8.80%	6.64%	5.17%	4.27%	3.92%
Native American or Alaska Native alone (NH)	43	130	215	343	393	0.07%	0.16%	0.17%	0.19%	0.16%
Asian alone (NH)	118	461	1,571	5,497	12,879	0.20%	0.57%	1.24%	3.00%	5.20%
Native Hawaiian or Pacific Islander alone (NH)	x	x	29	75	115	x	x	0.02%	0.04%	0.05%
Other race alone (NH)	47	11	67	214	1,020	0.08%	0.01%	0.05%	0.12%	0.41%
Mixed race or Multiracial (NH)	x	x	839	2,290	8,941	x	x	0.66%	1.25%	3.61%
Hispanic or Latino (any race)	381	522	3,197	8,166	14,261	0.66%	0.64%	2.52%	4.46%	5.76%
Total	58,108	81,021	126,638	183,182	247,726	100.00%	100.00%	100.00%	100.00%	100.00%

=== 2020 census ===
As of the 2020 census, the county had a population of 247,726, 86,884 households, and 68,001 families residing in the county. The population increase of 64,544, or 35.2% over the 2010 figure of 183,182 residents, represents the largest net increase in the county's history.

The median age was 39.4 years, with 27.6% of residents under the age of 18 and 13.8% aged 65 years or older. For every 100 females there were 95.2 males, and for every 100 females age 18 and over there were 92.1 males.

The racial makeup of the county was 82.2% White, 4.0% Black or African American, 0.2% American Indian and Alaska Native, 5.2% Asian, <0.1% Native Hawaiian and Pacific Islander, 2.1% from some other race, and 6.2% from two or more races. Hispanic or Latino residents of any race comprised 5.8% of the population.

81.4% of residents lived in urban areas, while 18.6% lived in rural areas.

Of the 86,884 households, 41.0% had children under the age of 18 living in them. Of all households, 67.3% were married-couple households, 10.6% were households with a male householder and no spouse or partner present, and 19.2% were households with a female householder and no spouse or partner present. About 18.1% of all households were made up of individuals and 7.3% had someone living alone who was 65 years of age or older. There were 91,133 housing units, of which 4.7% were vacant. Among occupied housing units, 78.5% were owner-occupied and 21.5% were renter-occupied. The homeowner vacancy rate was 1.0% and the rental vacancy rate was 7.1%.

=== 2010 census ===
As of the census of 2010, there were 183,182 people, 64,886 households, and 51,242 households residing in the county. The population density was 314.21 persons per square mile (121.32 persons/km^{2}). The housing unit density was 111.30 units per square mile (42.97 units/km^{2}). The racial makeup of the county was 90.05% White, 4.34% African American, 3.01% Asian, 0.22% Native American, 0.04% Pacific Islander, and 1.32% from two or more races. Those of Hispanic or Latino origins constituted 4.46% of the population. Williamson County is estimated to be the county in Tennessee with the highest percentage of Asian residents.

Of all of the households, 41.11% had children under the age of 18 living in them, 68.08% were married couples living together, 2.67% had a male householder with no wife present, 8.22% had a female householder with no husband present, and 21.03% were non-families. 17.73% of all households were made up of individuals, and 5.85% had someone living alone who was 65 years of age or older. The average household size was 2.81 and the average family size was 3.20.

The age distribution was 29.28% under the age of 18, 61.00% ages 18 to 64, and 9.72% age 65 and older. The median age was 38.5 years. 51.23% of the population were females and 48.77% were males.

=== Economic data ===
In 2006 it was the 17th-wealthiest county in the country according to the U.S. Census Bureau, but the Council for Community and Economic Research ranked Williamson County as America's wealthiest county (1st) when the local cost of living was factored into the equation with median household income. In 2010, Williamson County is listed 17th on the Forbes list of the 25 wealthiest counties in America.

By 2006 Williamson County had a population of 160,781 representing 27.0% population growth since 2000. The census bureau lists Williamson as one of the 100 fastest-growing counties in the United States for the period 2000–2005.

== Government and politics ==
United States presidential election results for Williamson County, Tennessee
Year	Republican		Democratic		Third party(ies)	
Year	No.	%	No.	%	No.	%
1880	1,541	36.06%	2,733	63.94%	0	0.00%
1884	1,461	41.60%	2,025	57.66%	26	0.74%
1888	1,491	37.21%	2,358	58.85%	158	3.94%
1892	575	18.72%	1,992	64.86%	504	16.41%
1896	1,281	28.81%	3,097	69.66%	68	1.53%
1900	704	24.05%	2,136	72.98%	87	2.97%
1904	475	18.79%	1,932	76.42%	121	4.79%
1908	605	23.62%	1,928	75.28%	28	1.09%
1912	797	25.94%	2,205	71.75%	71	2.31%
1916	600	22.68%	2,036	76.95%	10	0.38%
1920	946	32.07%	2,004	67.93%	0	0.00%
1924	242	12.63%	1,626	84.86%	48	2.51%
1928	693	30.29%	1,595	69.71%	0	0.00%
1932	261	8.45%	2,777	89.96%	49	1.59%
1936	286	9.35%	2,769	90.52%	4	0.13%
1940	505	13.48%	3,215	85.82%	26	0.69%
1944	602	18.42%	2,656	81.27%	10	0.31%
1948	556	14.40%	2,294	59.41%	1,011	26.18%
1952	2,326	36.17%	4,085	63.53%	19	0.30%
1956	1,979	31.86%	4,174	67.20%	58	0.93%
1960	2,699	37.34%	4,471	61.86%	58	0.80%
1964	2,707	34.79%	5,075	65.21%	0	0.00%
1968	2,788	28.69%	2,063	21.23%	4,867	50.08%
1972	7,556	71.53%	2,616	24.76%	392	3.71%
1976	7,880	48.44%	8,183	50.31%	203	1.25%
1980	11,597	54.98%	8,815	41.79%	683	3.24%
1984	17,975	71.91%	6,929	27.72%	93	0.37%
1988	20,847	72.33%	7,864	27.28%	112	0.39%
1992	22,015	54.77%	13,053	32.47%	5,127	12.76%
1996	27,699	61.04%	15,231	33.57%	2,446	5.39%
2000	38,901	66.58%	18,745	32.08%	783	1.34%
2004	57,451	72.13%	21,732	27.28%	467	0.59%
2008	64,858	69.12%	27,886	29.72%	1,092	1.16%
2012	69,850	72.59%	25,142	26.13%	1,233	1.28%
2016	68,212	64.19%	31,013	29.18%	7,046	6.63%
2020	86,469	62.20%	50,161	36.08%	2,386	1.72%
2024	94,562	65.36%	47,695	32.97%	2,411	1.67%

Before 1964, Williamson County was a classic "Solid South" county. However, as seen in the table on county voting in presidential elections, from 1964 to 1972 the majority of voters shifted from the Democratic Party, which had long dominated county and state politics, to the Republican Party. Since the 1970s, Williamson County has been one of the most Republican suburban counties in the country. Jimmy Carter is the last Democrat to garner even 40 percent of the county's vote. As a measure of the county's Republican bent, it rejected Bill Clinton in 1992 and 1996 even with Tennessean Al Gore on the ticket as his running mate, and Gore only got 32 percent in his own run for president in 2000.

In 2020, Joe Biden obtained the highest percentage for a Democratic candidate since 1980, but this represented just over one-third of the vote. The only statewide Democratic candidate in the 21st century to receive 40% or more of the county's vote in any election being Phil Bredesen in his successful 2002 and 2006 bids for Governor, and his unsuccessful 2018 bid for United States Senator.

The chief executive officer of Williamson County's government is the County Mayor, who is popularly elected at-large to a four-year term. The mayor is responsible for the county's fiscal management and its day-to-day business. Rogers C. Anderson has been mayor since 2002.

The county mayor is assisted by directors of the Agricultural Exposition Park, Animal Control, Budget & Purchasing, Community Development, County Archives, Employee Benefits, Human Resources, Information Technology, Parks & Recreation, Emergency Management, Public Safety, Property Management, Risk Management, Solid Waste Management and WC-TV.

The mayor works closely with the 24-member Board of County Commissioners, two members popularly elected to four-year terms from each of the 12 voting districts of roughly equal populations. A chairman of the board is elected by the membership annually. The Board of Commissioners appoints the members of the Planning Commission, Highway Commission, Beer Board, Board of Zoning Appeals, Building Board of Adjustments, County Records Committee, Library Board and others.

=== Board of Commissioners ===
District	Name
County Commissioner (District 1)	Lisa Lenox (R)
County Commissioner (District 1)	Ricky D. Jones (R)
County Commissioner (District 2)	Elizabeth C. "Betsy" Hester (R)
County Commissioner (District 2)	Judy Herbert (R)
County Commissioner (District 3)	Jennifer Mason (R)
County Commissioner (District 3)	Jeff Graves (R)
County Commissioner (District 4)	Pete Stresser (R)
County Commissioner (District 4)	Gregg Lawrence (R)
County Commissioner (District 5)	Mary Smith (R)
County Commissioner (District 5)	Greg Sanford (R)
County Commissioner (District 6)	Paul Webb (R)
County Commissioner (District 6)	Erin Nations (R)
County Commissioner (District 7)	Chris Richards (R)
County Commissioner (District 7)	Tom Tunnicliffe (R)
County Commissioner (District 8)	Barb Sturgeon (R)
County Commissioner (District 8)	Drew Tores (R)
County Commissioner (District 9)	Chas Morton (R)
County Commissioner (District 9)	Matt Williams (R)
County Commissioner (District 10)	Meghan Guffee (R)
County Commissioner (District 10)	David Landrum (R)
County Commissioner (District 11)	Sean Aiello (R)
County Commissioner (District 11)	Brian Beathard (R)
County Commissioner (District 12)	Brian Clifford (R)
County Commissioner (District 12)	Steve Smith (R)

=== Elected officials ===
Office	Party
County Mayor	Rogers C. Anderson (R)
County Clerk	Jeff Whidby (R)
Property Assessor	Brad Coleman (R)
Register of Deeds	Sherry Anderson (R)
Trustee	Karen Paris (R)
Sheriff	Jeff Hughes (R)
Circuit Court Clerk	Debbie Barrett (R)
Juvenile Court Clerk	Margaret Gurley Mahew (R)
General Sessions Judge (Div. I)	Denise Andre (R)
General Sessions Judge (Div. II)	Tom Taylor (R)
Juvenile Court Judge	Sharon Guffee (R)
Clerk & Master (Chancery)	Jakob Schwendimann (Note: These positions are through appointment and are nonpartisan.)
Highway Superintendent	Eddie Hood
Election Administrator	Chad Gray

The county's Assessor of Property, County Clerk, Circuit Court Clerk, Juvenile Court Clerk, Register of Deeds, Sheriff, Trustee and two judges of the General Sessions Court are popularly elected to four-year terms. Other officials, including the Chancery Court Clerk, Election Administrator, and Highway Superintendent, are appointed for four-year terms. The latter two are appointed by the Election Commission and Highway Commission respectively, and the Chancery Court Clerk is appointed by the elected judges of Tennessee's 21st Judicial District.

== Education ==
Williamson County Schools, which operates 50 schools, has K–12 education for most of the county. A portion of the city of Franklin is under the Franklin Special School District for K-8 and the Williamson County district for high school.

=== Higher education ===
- Belmont University, Williamson County Campus
- Columbia State Community College, Franklin Campus
- King University, Nashville Campus
- O'More College of Design
- University of Phoenix, Franklin Learning Center
- Williamson College

== Communities ==
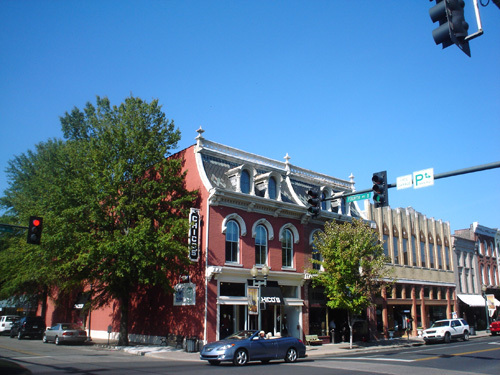
Franklin

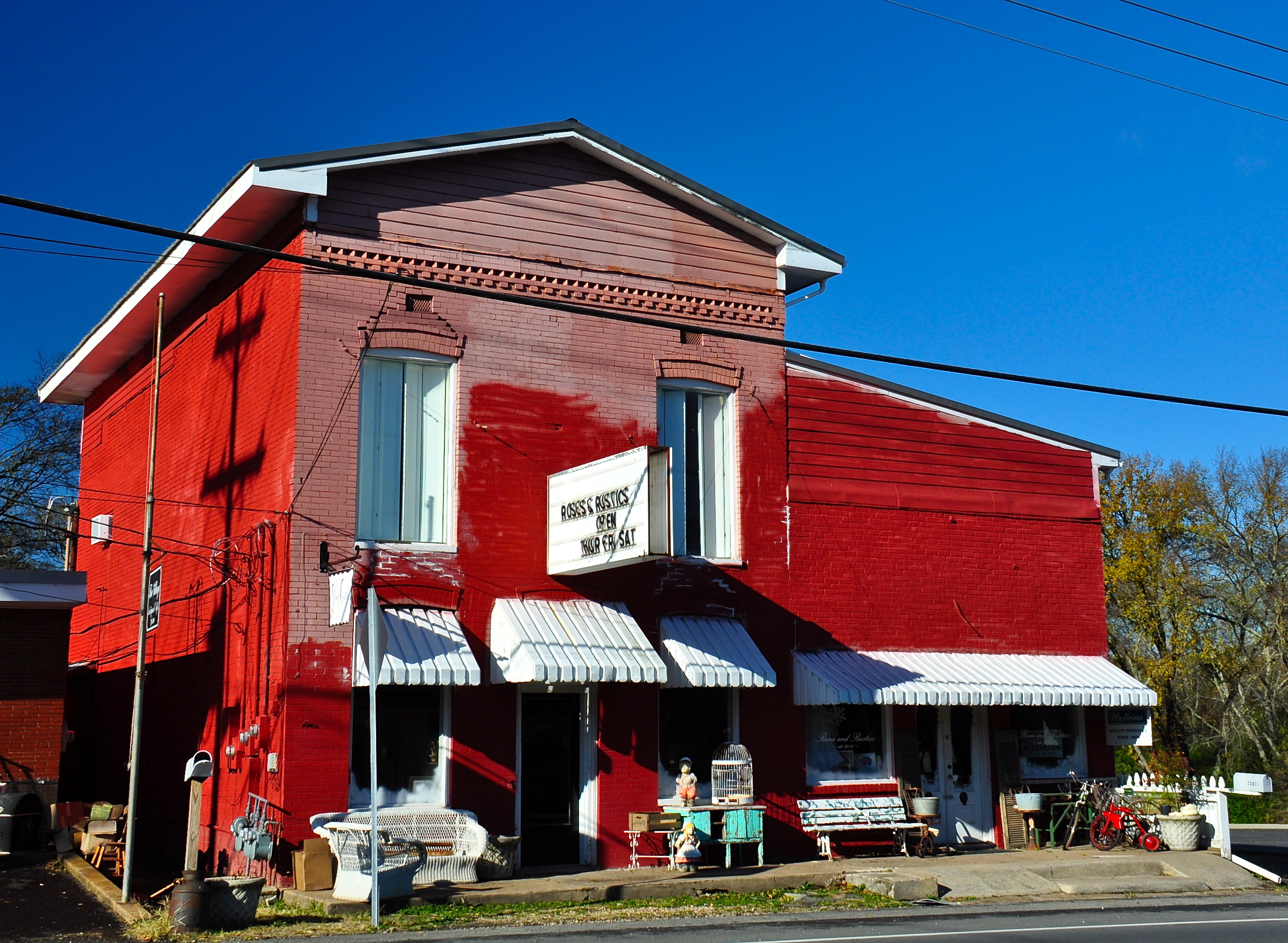
Nolensville

=== Cities ===
- Brentwood
- Fairview
- Franklin (county seat)
- Spring Hill (partly in Maury County)

=== Towns ===
- Nolensville
- Thompson's Station

=== Unincorporated communities ===
- Allisona (partial)
- Arrington
- Bethesda
- Boston
- Brush Creek
- Burwood
- College Grove
- Duplex
- Fernvale
- Kirkland
- Leiper's Fork
- Liberty Hill
- Peytonsville
- Rudderville
- Triune

== See also ==
- National Register of Historic Places listings in Williamson County, Tennessee
