= List of Tennessee state high school football champions =

Tennessee state high school football championships

This is a list of the Tennessee state high school football champions which have been sanctioned by the Tennessee Secondary School Athletic Association (TSSAA).

== List of Tennessee state high school football champions ==
| Year | Division II-AAA | Division II-AA | Division II-A | Class 6A | Class 5A | Class 4A | Class 3A | Class 2A | Class 1A |
|---|---|---|---|---|---|---|---|---|---|
| 2025 | Baylor | Battle Ground | Nashville Christian | Oakland | Page | Alcoa | Westview | Huntingdon | South Pittsburg |
| 2024 | McCallie | Christ Presbyterian | Nashville Christian | Oakland | Sevier County | Macon County | Alcoa | Marion County | Memphis Academy of Science & Engineering |
| 2023 | McCallie | Christ Presbyterian | Middle Tennessee Christian | Houston | Knoxville West | Pearl Cohn | Alcoa | Decatur County Riverside | South Pittsburg |
| 2022 | Baylor | Lipscomb Academy | Friendship Christian | Oakland | Knoxville West | Anderson County | Alcoa | Tyner | McKenzie |
| 2021 | McCallie | Lipscomb Academy | Donelson Christian | Oakland | Powell | Tullahoma | Alcoa | Westview | South Pittsburg |
| 2020 | McCallie | Christ Presbyterian | Davidson | Oakland | Summit | Elizabethton | Alcoa | Peabody | Fayatteville |
| 2019 | McCallie | Evangelical Christian | Davidson | Maryville | Knoxville Central | Elizabethton | Alcoa | Peabody | Lake County |
| 2018 | Brentwood Academy | Christ Presbyterian | Davidson | Oakland | Knoxville Central | Greeneville | Alcoa | Peabody | Whitwell |
| 2017 | Brentwood Academy | Lausanne | Friendship Christian | Maryville | Knoxville Catholic | Greeneville | Alcoa | Union City | Greenback |
| Year | Division II-AA | | Division II-A | Class 6A | Class 5A | Class 4A | Class 3A | Class 2A | Class 1A |
| 2016 | Brentwood Academy | | Lausanne | Whitehaven | Farragut | Memphis East | Alcoa | Trezevant | Dresden |
| 2015 | Brentwood Academy | | St. George's | Ravenwood | Independence | Knoxville Catholic | Alcoa | Trezevant | Nashville Christian |
| 2014 | Montgomery Bell | | Webb | Maryville | Knoxville West | Fulton | Christ Presbyterian | Peabody | Union City |
| 2013 | Ensworth | | Webb | Maryville | Henry County | Fulton | Alcoa | Trousdale | Union City |
| 2012 | Ensworth | | Webb | Whitehaven | Beech | Fulton | Christian Academy of Knoxville | Friendship Christian | Gordonsville |
| 2011 | Ensworth | | St. George's | Maryville | Henry County | Greeneville | Christian Academy of Knoxville | Friendship Christian | Wayne County |
| 2010 | Ensworth | | Webb | Maryville | Columbia Central | Greeneville | Alcoa | Signal Mountain | South Pittsburg |
| 2009 | Memphis University School | | Webb | White Station | Beech | Giles County | Alcoa | Trousdale County | Union City |
| Year | Division II-AA | | Division II-A | Class 5A | | Class 4A | Class 3A | Class 2A | Class 1A |
| 2008 | Memphis University School | | Davidson | Oakland | | Hillsboro | Knoxville Catholic | Alcoa | Trousdale County |
| 2007 | No champion (Note: Montgomery Bell Academy was forced to vacate the 2007 state football title due to violations of the recruiting and financial aid rules.) | | St. George's | Smyrna | | Maryville | David Lipscomb | Alcoa | South Pittsburg |
| Year | Division II-AAA | Division II-AA | Division II-A | Class 5A | | Class 4A | Class 3A | Class 2A | Class 1A |
| 2006 | Brentwood Academy | Webb | Davidson | Smyrna | | Maryville | Fulton | Alcoa | Jackson Christian |
| 2005 | Memphis University School | Evangelical Christian | Davidson | Ravenwood | | Maryville | Livingston Academy | Alcoa | Trousdale County |
| 2004 | Memphis University School | Briarcrest | Bishop Byrne | Riverdale | | Maryville | Fulton | Alcoa | Donelson Christian |
| 2003 | Montgomery Bell | Battle Ground | Southern Baptist Educational Center | Germantown | | Hillsboro | Fulton | Huntingdon | Boyd Buchanan |
| 2002 | Montgomery Bell | Briarcrest | Bishop Byrne | Brentwood | | Maryville | Ridgeway | David Lipscomb | Christ Presbyterian |
| 2001 | McCallie | Battle Ground | Bishop Byrne | Riverdale | | Maryville | Austin East | Goodpasture | Ezell Harding |
| Year | Division II-AA | | Division II-A | Class 5A | | Class 4A | Class 3A | Class 2A | Class 1A |
| 2000 | Montgomery Bell | | Evangelical Christian | Red Bank | | Maryville | Portland | Alcoa | Christ Presbyterian |
| 1999 | Montgomery Bell | | Evangelical Christian | Sevier County | | Memphis East | Milan | Goodpasture | South Pittsburg |
| 1998 | Montgomery Bell | | Battle Ground | Oakland | | Maryville | Melrose | Milan | Trousdale County |
| Year | Division II Large | | Division II Small | Class 5A | | Class 4A | Class 3A | Class 2A | Class 1A |
| 1997 | Father Ryan | | Battle Ground | Riverdale | | Pearl Cohn | White House | Tyner | Trousdale County |
| Year | Class 5A | | | | | Class 4A | Class 3A | Class 2A | Class 1A |
| 1996 | Brentwood Academy | | | | | Pearl Cohn | Melrose | Webb | Donelson Christian |
| 1995 | Brentwood Academy | | | | | Cleveland | Marion County | Goodpasture | Battle Ground |
| 1994 | Riverdale | | | | | Cleveland | Marion County | David Lipscomb | South Pittsburg |
| 1993 | Lincoln County | | | | | Cleveland | Springfield | Sweetwater | Trousdale County |
| Year | Class AAA | | | | | Class AA | | Class A | |
| 1992 | Gallatin | | | | | Marion County | | Oneida | |
| 1991 | Oak Ridge | | | | | Brentwood Academy | | Franklin Road | |
| 1990 | Lincoln County | | | | | Marion County | | Trousdale County | |
| 1989 | Gallatin | | | | | Alcoa | | Bruceton Central | |
| 1988 | Dickson County | | | | | Brentwood Academy | | Donelson Christian | |
| 1987 | Jefferson County | | | | | Brentwood Academy | | Greenback | |
| 1986 | Knoxville Halls | | | | | Austin East | | Spring Hill | |
| 1985 | Hillcrest | | | | | Memphis University School | | Lake County | |
| 1984 | Oakland | | | | | Marshall County | | Gordonsville | |
| 1983 | Germantown | | | | | Austin East | | Evangelical Christian | |
| 1982 | Lincoln County | | | | | Brentwood Academy | | Memphis Catholic | |
| 1981 | John Overton | | | | | Brentwood Academy | | Webb | |
| 1980 | Oak Ridge | | | | | Brentwood Academy | | Lake County | |
| 1979 | Oak Ridge | | | | | Humboldt | | Alcoa | |
| 1978 | Gallatin | | | | | Maryville | | Alcoa | |
| 1977 | Christian Brothers | | | | | Milan | | Alcoa | |
| 1976 | Bradley Central | | | | | Maryville | | Rockwood | |
| 1975 | Oak Ridge | | | | | Loudon | | Walland | |
| 1974 | Father Ryan | | | | | Loudon | | Brentwood Academy | |
| 1973 | Baylor | | | | | Kingston | | Dyer County | |
| 1972 | Tennessee | | | | | Trousdale County | | Sweetwater | |
| 1971 | Tennessee | | | | | Milan | | Sweetwater | |
| 1970 | Murfreesboro Central | | | | | Maryville | | Tennessee Prep | |
| 1969 | Morristown East | | | | | Loudon | | South Pittsburg | |

- 1938 – Elizabethton

=== Most state football championships ===
| Team | Titles | Title Years (Fall) |
|---|---|---|
| Alcoa Tornadoes | 24 | 1977, 1978, 1979, 1989, 2000, 2004, 2005, 2006, 2007, 2008, 2009, 2010, 2013, 2015, 2016, 2017, 2018, 2019, 2020, 2021, 2022, 2023, 2024, 2025 |
| Maryville Rebels | 17 | 1970, 1976, 1978, 1998, 2000, 2001, 2002, 2004, 2005, 2006, 2007, 2010, 2011, 2013, 2014, 2017, 2019 |
| Brentwood Academy Eagles | 14 | 1974, 1980, 1981, 1982, 1987, 1988, 1991, 1995, 1996, 2006, 2015, 2016, 2017, 2018 |
| Trousdale County Yellow Jackets | 9 | 1972, 1990, 1993, 1997, 1998, 2005, 2008, 2009, 2013 |
| Oakland Patriots | 9 | 1984, 1998, 2008, 2018, 2020, 2021, 2022, 2024, 2025 |
| South Pittsburg Pirates | 8 | 1969, 1994, 1999, 2007, 2010, 2021, 2023, 2025 |
| Webb Spartans | 8 | 1981, 1996, 2006, 2009, 2010, 2012, 2013, 2014 |
| Christ Presbyterian Lions | 7 | 2000, 2002, 2014, 2018, 2020, 2023, 2024 |

== See also ==
- Tennessee Secondary School Athletic Association
