= List of Tennessee Secondary School Athletic Association championships =

This list of Tennessee Secondary School Athletic Association championships gives the past US state of Tennessee champions of the Tennessee Secondary School Athletic Association in all sanctioned sports and non-sports.

== Fall sports ==
=== Cross Country ===
==== Boys ====
Year	Class A	Class AA	Class AAA	Division II A	Division II AA
2026	Gatlinburg-Pittman	Murfreesboro Central Magnet	Daniel Boone	University School of Nashville	Knoxville Catholic
2025	University School Johnson City	Martin Luther King Nashville	Independence	Davidson Academy	McCallie
Year	Class A-AA		Class AAA	Division II A	Division II AA
2024	Murfreesboro Central Magnet		Hardin Valley	Davidson Academy	Knoxville Catholic
2023	Signal Mountain		Farragut	Columbia Academy	McCallie
2022	Signal Mountain		Farragut	University School of Nashville	McCallie
2021	Murfreesboro Central Magnet		Hardin Valley	University School of Nashville	McCallie
Year	Small Class		Large Class	Division II A	Division II AA
2020	Signal Mountain		Hardin Valley	Webb School of Knoxville	McCallie
2019	Signal Mountain		Siegel	University School of Nashville	McCallie
2018	University School Johnson City		Siegel	Chattanooga Christian	Brentwood Academy
2017	University School Johnson City		Siegel	Chattanooga Christian	Brentwood Academy
Year	Class A-AA		Class AAA	Division II A	Division II AA
2016	Knoxville Catholic		Brentwood	Webb School of Knoxville	Brentwood Academy
2015	Knoxville Catholic		Brentwood	Webb School of Knoxville	Brentwood Academy
2014	Hume Fogg		Daniel Boone	Webb School of Knoxville	Brentwood Academy
2013	Murfreesboro Central Magnet		Brentwood	Webb School of Knoxville	McCallie
2012	Greeneville		Brentwood	Webb School of Knoxville	McCallie
2011	Greeneville		Brentwood	University School of Nashville	Brentwood Academy
2010	Martin Luther King Nashville		Hardin Valley	Webb School of Knoxville	Montgomery Bell Academy
2009	Martin Luther King Nashville		Morristown West	Webb School of Knoxville	Montgomery Bell Academy
2008	Martin Luther King Nashville		Houston	University School of Nashville	Baylor
2007	University School Johnson City		Oak Ridge	University School of Nashville	Baylor
Year	Class A-AA		Class AAA	Division II	
2006	David Lipscomb		Oak Ridge	McCallie	
2005	Franklin Road Academy		Oak Ridge	McCallie	
2004	Elizabethton		Houston	Brentwood Academy	
2003	Franklin Road Academy		Houston	Webb School of Knoxville	
2002	Franklin Road Academy		McMinn County	Webb School of Knoxville	
2001	Franklin Road Academy		Farragut	McCallie	
2000	Franklin Road Academy		Houston	Baylor	
1999	Brainerd		Farragut	Baylor	
1998	Daniel Boone		Houston	Montgomery Bell Academy	
1997	Franklin Road Academy		Houston	Montgomery Bell Academy	
Year	Class A-AA		Class AAA		
1996	Chattanooga Christian		Dobyns Bennett		
1995	Chattanooga Christian		Dobyns Bennett		
1994	Knoxville West		Baylor		
1993	Brentwood Academy		Baylor		
1992	Memphis University School		Farragut		
1991	Memphis University School		Oak Ridge		
1990	Webb School of Knoxville		Dobyns Bennett		
Year					
1989	Dobyns Bennett				
1988	Baylor				
1987	Brentwood Academy				
1986	Baylor				
1985	Oak Ridge				
1984	Oak Ridge				
1983	Oak Ridge				
1982	Christian Brothers				
1981	Daniel Boone				
1980	Oak Ridge				
1979	Northwest				
1978	Northwest				
1977	Harding Academy				
1976	Fairley				
1975	McGavock				
1974	Northwest				
1973	Raleigh Egypt				
1972	Raleigh Egypt				
1971	Clarksville				
1970	South Doyle				
1969	Clarksville				
1968	Frayser				
1967	Trezevant				
1966	Clarksville				
1965	Clarksville				
1964	Clarksville				
1963	Science Hill				
1962	Clarksville				
1961	Clarksville				

==== Most state boys cross country championships ====
Team	Titles	Title Years (Fall)
Webb School of Knoxville	11	1990, 2002, 2003, 2009, 2010, 2012, 2013, 2014, 2015, 2016, 2020
McCallie	11	2001, 2005, 2006, 2012, 2013, 2019, 2020, 2021, 2022, 2023, 2025
Brentwood Academy	9	1987, 1993, 2004, 2011, 2014, 2015, 2016, 2017, 2018
Oak Ridge	8	1980, 1983, 1984, 1985, 1991, 2005, 2006, 2007
Baylor	8	1986, 1988, 1993, 1994, 1999, 2000, 2007, 2008

==== Girls ====
Year	Class A	Class AA	Class AAA	Division II A	Division II AA
2026	University School Johnson City	Signal Mountain	Brentwood	Christian Academy of Knoxville	Father Ryan
2025	University School Johnson City	Signal Mountain	Brentwood	Battle Ground Academy	Webb School of Knoxville
Year	Class A-AA		Class AAA	Division II A	Division II AA
2024	Signal Mountain		Brentwood	Columbia Academy	Webb School of Knoxville
2023	Signal Mountain		Brentwood	Webb School of Bell Buckle	Webb School of Knoxville
2022	Signal Mountain		Brentwood	Westminster Academy	Harpeth Hall
2021	Murfreesboro Central Magnet		Brentwood	St. George's	Harpeth Hall
Year	Small Class		Large Class	Division II A	Division II AA
2020	Signal Mountain		Brentwood	St. George's	Girls Preparatory School
2019	Signal Mountain		Dobyns Bennett	St. George's	Brentwood Academy
2018	Signal Mountain		Knoxville West	Webb School of Knoxville	Brentwood Academy
2017	Signal Mountain		Ravenwood	Webb School of Knoxville	Girls Preparatory School
Year	Class A-AA		Class AAA	Division II A	Division II AA
2016	Murfreesboro Central Magnet		Ravenwood	Webb School of Knoxville	Brentwood Academy
2015	Signal Mountain		Houston	Webb School of Knoxville	Brentwood Academy
2014	Signal Mountain		Morristown West	Webb School of Knoxville	Harpeth Hall
2013	Signal Mountain		Morristown West	Webb School of Knoxville	Brentwood Academy
2012	Christian Academy of Knoxville		Ravenwood	Webb School of Knoxville	Baylor
2011	Chattanooga Christian		Ravenwood	University School of Nashville	Harpeth Hall
2010	Greeneville		Oak Ridge	Webb School of Knoxville	Baylor
2009	University School Johnson City		Oak Ridge	Webb School of Knoxville	Baylor
2008	University School Johnson City		Science Hill	University School of Nashville	Baylor
2007	University School Johnson City		Oak Ridge	University School of Nashville	St. Agnes
Year	Class A-AA		Class AAA	Division II	
2006	University School Johnson City		Morristown West	Webb School of Knoxville	
2005	University School Johnson City		Morristown West	University School of Nashville	
2004	David Lipscomb		Brentwood	Brentwood Academy	
2003	David Lipscomb		Brentwood	Harpeth Hall	
2002	David Lipscomb		Houston	Harpeth Hall	
2001	David Lipscomb		Houston	Harpeth Hall	
2000	Chattanooga Christian		Houston	Harpeth Hall	
1999	Chattanooga Christian		Oak Ridge	Harpeth Hall	
1998	Sullivan Central		Knoxville West	Girls Preparatory School	
1997	Sullivan Central		Dobyns Bennett	Baylor	
Year	Class A-AA		Class AAA		
1996	Girls Preparatory School		Oak Ridge		
1995	Girls Preparatory School		Baylor		
1994	Girls Preparatory School		Science Hill		
1993	Girls Preparatory School		Morristown West		
1992	Brentwood Academy		Dobyns Bennett		
1991	Girls Preparatory School		Baylor		
1990	Girls Preparatory School		Farragut		
Year					
1989	Sullivan Central				
1988	Sullivan Central				
1987	Farragut				
1986	Gallatin				
1985	Gallatin				
1984	Farragut				
1983	Farragut				
1982	Oak Ridge				
1981	Harpeth Hall				
1980	Harpeth Hall				
1979	Memphis Catholic				
1978	Harpeth Hall				
1977	Harpeth Hall				
1976	Harpeth Hall				
1975	Harpeth Hall				

==== Most state girls cross country championships ====
Team	Titles	Title Years (Fall)
Harpeth Hall	14	1975, 1976, 1977, 1978, 1980, 1981, 2000, 2001, 2002, 2003, 2011, 2014, 2021, 2022
Webb School of Knoxville	13	2006, 2009, 2010, 2012, 2013, 2014, 2015, 2016, 2017, 2018, 2023, 2024, 2025
Signal Mountain	12	2013, 2014, 2015, 2017, 2018, 2019, 2020, 2022, 2023, 2024, 2025, 2026
Brentwood	9	2003, 2004, 2020, 2021, 2022, 2023, 2024, 2025, 2026
Girls Preparatory School	9	1990, 1991, 1993, 1995, 1996, 1998, 1999, 2017, 2020
Brentwood Academy	8	1992, 1994, 2004, 2013, 2015, 2016, 2018, 2019

=== Golf ===
==== Boys ====
Year	Class A	Class AA	Division II A	Division II AA
2026	Signal Mountain	Page	Christian Academy of Knoxville	Memphis University School
2025	Signal Mountain	Hardin Valley	First Baptist Academy	Brentwood Academy
2024	Stewart County	Brentwood	Jackson Christian	Brentwood Academy
2023	Kingston	Brentwood	Battle Ground Academy	Brentwood Academy
2022	Kingston	Collierville	Christian Academy of Knoxville	Ensworth
2021	Kingston	Brentwood	Christian Academy of Knoxville	Brentwood Academy
Year	Small Class	Large Class	Division II A	Division II AA
2020	Signal Mountain	Farragut	Christian Academy of Knoxville	Baylor
2019	Signal Mountain	Franklin	Christian Academy of Knoxville	Ensworth
2018	Signal Mountain	Science Hill	Christian Academy of Knoxville	Baylor
2017	Alcoa	Knoxville Halls	Christian Academy of Knoxville	Memphis University School
Year	Class A-AA	Class AAA	Division II A	Division II AA
2016	Christ Presbyterian Academy	Knoxville Halls	St. George's	Memphis University School
2015	Christian Academy of Knoxville	Brentwood	St. George's	Baylor
2014	Christ Presbyterian Academy	Farragut	Webb School of Knoxville	Memphis University School
2013	Alcoa	Hendersonville	St. George's	Memphis University School
2012	Macon County	Siegel	Evangelical Christian School	Baylor
2011	Notre Dame	Hendersonville	Evangelical Christian School	McCallie
2010	Christian Academy of Knoxville	Hendersonville	St. George's	McCallie
2009	Christian Academy of Knoxville	Farragut	Evangelical Christian School	Brentwood Academy
2008	Christ Presbyterian Academy	Farragut	St. George's	Baylor
2007	David Lipscomb	Houston	St. George's	Baylor
Year	Class A-AA	Class AAA	Division II	
2006	University School of Jackson	Clarksville	Baylor	
2005	Goodpasture	Clarksville	Baylor	
2004	Hixson	Jefferson County	Baylor	
2003	Lexington	Science Hill	Baylor	
2002	University School of Jackson	Clarksville	McCallie	
2001	Goodpasture	Science Hill	Baylor	
2000	Kingston	Hardin County	Baylor	
1999	Kingston	Oakland	Baylor	
1998	Marshall County	McMinn County	Christian Brothers	
1997	Marshall County	Germantown	Christian Brothers	
Year	Class A-AA		Class AAA	
1996	Memphis University School		Baylor	
1995	Evangelical Christian School		Baylor	
1994	Memphis University School		Baylor	
1993	Harding Academy		Baylor	
1992	Goodpasture		Farragut	
1991	Memphis University School		Farragut	
Year				
1990	Christian Brothers			
1989	Baylor			
1988	Baylor			
1987	Briarcrest			
1986	Knoxville Halls			
1985 (Spring)	Farragut			
1985 (Fall)	Notre Dame			
1984	Christian Brothers			
1983 (Spring)	Clarksville			
1983 (Fall)	Greeneville			
1982	Montgomery Bell Academy			
1981	Tullahoma			
1980	Tullahoma			
1979	Tennessee High			
1978	Tullahoma			
1977	John Overton			
1976	Tennessee High			
1975	Christian Brothers			
1974	Clarksville			
1973	Montgomery Bell Academy			
1972	Chattanooga City			
1971	Montgomery Bell Academy			
1970	Chattanooga City			
1969	Christian Brothers			
1968	Knoxville Holston			
1967	Two Rivers			
1966	Christian Brothers			
1965	Jackson			
1964	Chattanooga City			
1963	Memphis Central			
1962	Lewis County			
1961	White Station			
1960	Nashville DuPont			
1959	Science Hill			
1958	Nashville East			
1957	Montgomery Bell Academy			
1956	Memphis South Side			
1955	Memphis East			
1954	Nashville East			
1953	Father Ryan			
1952	Nashville East			
1951	Chattanooga Central			
1950	Memphis Central			
1949	Christian Brothers			
1948	Treadwell			
1947	Treadwell			
1946	Father Ryan			
1945	Hillsboro			
1944	Memphis Messick			
1943	Memphis Central			
1942	Nashville East			
1941	Memphis Messick			
1940	Memphis Messick			
1939	Memphis Central			
1938	Morristown			

==== Most state boys golf championships ====
Team	Titles	Title Years (Fall)
Baylor	20	1988, 1989, 1993, 1994, 1995, 1996, 1999, 2000, 2001, 2003, 2004, 2005, 2006, 2007, 2008, 2012, 2015, 2018, 2020, 2021
Christian Academy of Knoxville	10	2009, 2010, 2015, 2017, 2018, 2019, 2020, 2021, 2022, 2026
Christian Brothers	8	1949, 1966, 1969, 1975, 1984, 1990, 1997, 1998
Memphis University School	7	1991, 1994, 1996, 2013, 2014, 2016, 2017, 2026
Farragut	7	1985, 1991, 1992, 2008, 2009, 2014, 2020

==== Girls ====
Year	Class A	Class AA	Division II A	Division II AA
2026	Summertown	Ooltewah	Knoxville Grace	Baylor
2025	Greeneville	Page	Christian Academy of Knoxville	Baylor
2024	Cascade	Page	Christian Academy of Knoxville	St. Mary's
2023	Summertown	Dobyns Bennett	Providence Christian	Ensworth
2022	Summertown	Cookeville	Providence Christian	Ensworth
2021	Summertown	Cookeville	Providence Christian	Baylor
Year	Small Class	Large Class	Division II A	Division II AA
2020	Summertown	Station Camp	Franklin Road Academy	Baylor
2019	Summertown	Station Camp	Franklin Road Academy	St. Agnes
2018	Summertown	Station Camp	Franklin Road Academy	St. Agnes
2017	Signal Mountain	Houston	Franklin Road Academy	St. Agnes
Year	Class A-AA	Class AAA	Division II A	Division II AA
2016	Christian Academy of Knoxville	Clarksville	St. Mary's	St. Agnes
2015	Christian Academy of Knoxville	Houston	Battle Ground Academy	St. Agnes
2014	Signal Mountain	Rossview	St. George's	St. Agnes
2013	Sullivan South	Science Hill	Franklin Road Academy	Baylor
2012	Signal Mountain	Clarksville	Franklin Road Academy	Baylor
2011	Signal Mountain	Clarksville	University School of Nashville	Ensworth
2010	Signal Mountain	Soddy-Daisy	Franklin Road Academy	Baylor
2009	Signal Mountain	Soddy-Daisy	Donelson Christian Academy	Baylor
2008	University School of Jackson	Rossview	Davidson Academy	Baylor
2007	Donelson Christian Academy	Jefferson County	Davidson Academy	Baylor
Year	Class A-AA	Class AAA	Division II	
2006	Goodpasture	Farragut	Baylor	
2005	Franklin Road Academy	Independence	Baylor	
2004	Davidson Academy	Farragut	Baylor	
2003	Davidson Academy	Rossview	Baylor	
2002	Davidson Academy	Morristown West	Baylor	
2001	Christian Academy of Knoxville	Brentwood	Baylor	
2000	Davidson Academy	Soddy-Daisy	Baylor	
1999	Davidson Academy	Cookeville	Baylor	
1998	Davidson Academy	Tullahoma	Baylor	
1997	Davidson Academy	Brentwood	Baylor	
Year	Class A-AA		Class AAA	
1996	Davidson Academy		Baylor	
1995	Davidson Academy		Baylor	
1994	Lausanne		Jackson North Side	
1993	St. Agnes		Oakland	
1992	St. Agnes		Warren County	
1991	Harpeth Hall		Bartlett	
Year				
1990	Warren County			
1989	Dobyns Bennett			
1988	Waverly Central			
1987	Girls Preparatory School			
1986	Father Ryan			
1985	Hixson			
1984	Bishop Byrne			
1983 (Spring)	Bishop Byrne			
1983 (Fall)	Bishop Byrne			
1982	Germantown			
1981	Germantown			
1980	Girls Preparatory School			
1979	Girls Preparatory School			
1978	Girls Preparatory School			
1977	Girls Preparatory School			
1976	Girls Preparatory School			
1975	Girls Preparatory School			

==== Most state girls golf championships ====
Team	Titles	Title Years (Fall)
Baylor	22	1995, 1996, 1997, 1998, 1999, 2000, 2001, 2002, 2003, 2004, 2005, 2006, 2007, 2008, 2009, 2010, 2012, 2013, 2020, 2021, 2025, 2026
Davidson Academy	11	1995, 1996, 1997, 1998, 1999, 2000, 2002, 2003, 2004, 2007, 2008
St. Agnes Academy	8	1992, 1993, 2014, 2015, 2016, 2017, 2018, 2019
Franklin Road Academy	8	2005, 2010, 2012, 2013, 2017, 2018, 2019, 2020
Girls Preparatory School	7	1975, 1976, 1977, 1978, 1979, 1980, 1987
Summertown	7	2018, 2019, 2020, 2021, 2022, 2023, 2026

=== Girls Soccer ===
Year	Class A	Class AA	Class AAA	Division II A	Division II AA
2026	Merrol Hyde	Liberty Creek	Houston	Battle Ground Academy	Harpeth Hall
2025	Westview	Liberty Creek	Bearden	St. George's	Baylor
2024	Merrol Hyde	Franklin County	Houston	Evangelical Christian School	Baylor
2023	Liberty Creek	Station Camp	Bearden	Evangelical Christian School	Baylor
2022	Merrol Hyde	Page	Bearden	University School of Jackson	Girls Preparatory School
2021	Merrol Hyde	Page	Bearden	University School of Jackson	Harpeth Hall
2020	Signal Mountain	Greeneville	Ravenwood	Battle Ground Academy	Father Ryan
2019	Signal Mountain	Greeneville	Ravenwood	Battle Ground Academy	Briarcrest
2018	Signal Mountain	Beech	Houston	Christ Presbyterian Academy	Girls Preparatory School
2017	Alcoa	White House	Houston	St. George's	Baylor
Year	Class A-AA		Class AAA	Division II A	Division II AA
2016	Greeneville		Clarksville	Evangelical Christian School	Father Ryan
2015	Greeneville		Houston	Evangelical Christian School	Briarcrest
2014	Knoxville Catholic		Clarksville	Battle Ground Academy	Girls Preparatory School
2013	Knoxville Catholic		Houston	St. George's	Harpeth Hall
2012	Christ Presbyterian Academy		Franklin	University School of Nashville	Father Ryan
2011	Christian Academy of Knoxville		Franklin	University School of Jackson	Baylor
2010	Notre Dame		Houston	University School of Jackson	Baylor
2009	Christian Academy of Knoxville		Houston	St. George's	St. Agnes
2008	Christian Academy of Knoxville		Siegel	Harding Academy	Father Ryan
2007	Franklin Road Academy		Bearden	St. George's	Battle Ground Academy
Year	Class A-AA		Class AAA	Division II	
2006	Christian Academy of Knoxville		Bearden	St. Agnes	
2005	Franklin Road Academy		Collierville	Pope John Paul II	
2004	Franklin Road Academy		Houston	Baylor	
2003	Donelson Christian Academy		Franklin	Baylor	
2002	Franklin Road Academy		Franklin	Baylor	
2001	Ridgeway		Germantown	Baylor	
2000	Ridgeway		Franklin	Battle Ground Academy	
1999	Ridgeway		Germantown	Baylor	
1998	Ridgeway		Houston	Father Ryan	
1997	Chattanooga Christian		Brentwood	Baylor	
Year					
1996	Houston				
1995	Dobyns Bennett				
1994	Germantown				
1993	Franklin				
1992	Franklin				
1991	Franklin				
1990	Franklin				
1989	Franklin				
1988	Notre Dame				
1987	Franklin				
1986	Franklin				

==== Most state girls soccer championships ====
Team	Titles	Title Years (Fall)
Baylor	12	1997, 1999, 2001, 2002, 2003, 2004, 2010, 2011, 2017, 2023, 2024, 2025
Franklin	11	1986, 1987, 1989, 1990, 1991, 1992, 1993, 2000, 2002, 2003, 2011
Houston	11	1996, 1998, 2004, 2009, 2010, 2013, 2015, 2017, 2018, 2024, 2026
Battle Ground Academy	6	2000, 2007, 2014, 2019, 2020, 2026
Bearden	6	2006, 2007, 2021, 2022, 2023, 2025

=== Volleyball ===
Year	Class A	Class AA	Class AAA	Division II A	Division II AA
2026	Eagleville	Valor College Prep	Franklin	Goodpasture	Briarcrest
2025	Eagleville	Valor College Prep	Summit	Middle Tennessee Christian	Briarcrest
2024	Loretto	Valor College Prep	Nolensville	Northpoint Christian	Lipscomb Academy
2023	Sale Creek	Signal Mountain	Cleveland	Providence Christian	Briarcrest
2022	Summertown	Creek Wood	Cleveland	Battle Ground Academy	Briarcrest
2021	South Greene	Hume-Fogg	Nolensville	Battle Ground Academy	Knoxville Catholic
2020	Summertown	Nolensville	Brentwood	Goodpasture	Briarcrest
2019	Summertown	Nolensville	Brentwood	St. George's	Briarcrest
2018	Loretto	Portland	Brentwood	Webb School of Knoxville	Briarcrest
2017	Berean Christian	Portland	Brentwood	Webb School of Knoxville	Baylor
2016	Goodpasture	Knoxville Catholic	Brentwood	Webb School of Knoxville	Briarcrest
2015	Goodpasture	Sullivan South	Brentwood	Webb School of Knoxville	Father Ryan
2014	Goodpasture	Christian Academy of Knoxville	Brentwood	Webb School of Knoxville	Baylor
2013	Goodpasture	Sullivan South	Brentwood	Webb School of Knoxville	St. Agnes
2012	Friendship Christian	Goodpasture	Ravenwood	St. Cecilia	St. Agnes
2011	Friendship Christian	Page	Ravenwood	St. George's	Ensworth
2010	Signal Mountain	Page	Ravenwood	St. George's	Ensworth
2009	Boyd Buchanan	Red Bank	Dobyns Bennett	Evangelical Christian School	St. Benedict
Year	Class A-AA		Class AAA	Division II A	Division II AA
2008	Greenbrier		Independence	Harding Academy	Girls Preparatory School
2007	Greenbrier		Brentwood	Harding Academy	Girls Preparatory School
Year	Class A-AA		Class AAA	Division II	
2006	Notre Dame		Brentwood	Father Ryan	
2005	East Ridge		Germantown	Harpeth Hall	
2004	David Lipscomb		Brentwood	Father Ryan	
2003	Page		Germantown	Briarcrest	
2002	Page		Brentwood	Harding Academy	
2001	Page		Brentwood	Harpeth Hall	
2000	Page		Brentwood	Girls Preparatory School	
1999	Anderson County		Brentwood	Father Ryan	
1998	Hume Fogg		Brentwood	Baylor	
1997	Livingston Academy		East Ridge	Baylor	
Year	Class A-AA		Class AAA		
1996	University School of Nashville		Sullivan South		
1995	University School of Nashville		Sullivan South		
1994	University School of Nashville		Bradley Central		
1993	University School of Nashville		Bradley Central		
1992	Harding Academy		Father Ryan		
1991	South Doyle		Bradley Central		
1990	Briarcrest		Germantown		
Year	Small Class		Large Class		
1989	Briarcrest		Germantown		
Year					
1988	Germantown				
1987	Briarcrest				
1986	Glencliff				
1985	Germantown				
1984	Sullivan South				
1983	Germantown				
1982	Bradley Central				
1981	Briarcrest				
1980	Chattanooga Kirkman				
1979	Chattanooga Kirkman				
1978	Chattanooga Kirkman				
1977	Chattanooga Kirkman				
1976	Chattanooga Kirkman				

==== Most state volleyball championships ====
Team	Titles	Title Years (Fall)
Brentwood	16	1998, 1999, 2000, 2001, 2002, 2004, 2006, 2007, 2013, 2014, 2015, 2016, 2017, 2018, 2019, 2020
Briarcrest	13	1981, 1987, 1989, 1990, 2003, 2016, 2018, 2019, 2020, 2022, 2023, 2025, 2026
Germantown	7	1996, 1998, 2004, 2009, 2010, 2013, 2015, 2017, 2018, 2024
Goodpasture	7	2012, 2013, 2014, 2015, 2016, 2020, 2026
Page	6	2000, 2001, 2002, 2003, 2010, 2011
Webb School of Knoxville	6	2013, 2014, 2015, 2016, 2017, 2018

== Winter sports ==
=== Basketball ===
==== Boys ====
Year	Class 1A	Class 2A	Class 3A	Class 4A	Division II A	Division II AA
2026	Jackson County	Chattanooga Prep	Alcoa	Bartlett	Providence Christian	Briarcrest
2025	Chattanooga Prep	Loretto	Upperman	Hillsboro	Providence Christian	Webb School of Knoxville
2024	Chattanooga Prep	Alcoa	Fulton	Independence	First Assembly Christian School	Briarcrest
2023	Hampton	Alcoa	Fulton	Memphis Overton	Goodpasture	Brentwood Academy
2022	East Robertson	East Nashville	Greeneville	Dobyns Bennett	First Assembly Christian School	Christian Brothers
Year	Class A		Class AA	Class AAA	Division II A	Division II AA
2021	Clay County		Greeneville	Houston	Goodpasture	Montgomery Bell Academy
2020	Did not play due to the COVID-19 pandemic.				Lausanne	Knoxville Catholic
2019	Columbia Academy		Wooddale	Bearden	Webb School of Knoxville	Briarcrest
2018	Loretto		Hamilton	No Champion (Note: The TSSAA deemed that James Wiseman was competing without eligibility as a student-athlete.The TSSAA retroactively enforced its ruling, ordering Memphis East High School to vacate all wins from the 2017-18 and 2018-19 seasons.)	Knoxville Grace	Brentwood Academy
2017	Harriman		Maplewood	Memphis East	Lausanne	Brentwood Academy
2016	Mitchell		Fulton	Memphis East	Harding Academy	Brentwood Academy
2015	Mitchell		Haywood	Hamilton	St. George's	Brentwood Academy
2014	Mitchell		Jackson South Side	Blackman	Battle Ground Academy	Ensworth
2013	Humboldt		Christ Presbyterian Academy	Southwind	Lausanne	Ensworth
2012	Friendship Christian		Christ Presbyterian Academy	Memphis East	Donelson Christian Academy	Ensworth
2011	Lake County		Liberty	Craigmont	Evangelical Christian School	Ensworth
2010	Clarksville Academy		Bolivar Central	Melrose	St. George's	No Champion (Note: Montgomery Bell Academy were forced to vacate the 2010 state championship due to improper financial aid given to student athletes and their families.)
2009	Manassas		Fulton	White Station	Harding Academy	Ensworth
2008	Union City		Fulton	Ridgeway	Harding Academy	Briarcrest
Year	Class A		Class AA	Class AAA	Division II	
2007	Tennessee Temple		Liberty	Maryville	Memphis University School	
2006	Union City		Liberty	Hamilton	Brentwood Academy	
2005	Middleton		Bolivar Central	Ridgeway	Brentwood Academy	
2004	Unaka		Bolivar Central	White Station	Brentwood Academy	
2003	Tennessee Temple		Giles County	White Station	Brentwood Academy	
2002	Tennessee Temple		Ridgeway	White Station	Father Ryan	
2001	Chattanooga Christian		B.T. Washington	Bartlett	Montgomery Bell Academy	
2000	South Fulton		Ridgeway	White Station	Montgomery Bell Academy	
1999	Moore County		Carver	White Station	Father Ryan	
1998	Ezell Harding		Kingsbury	White Station	Montgomery Bell Academy	
Year	Class A		Class AA	Class AAA		
1997	Perry County		Union City	Cleveland		
1996	Boyd Buchanan		Martin Luther King-Nashville	Memphis East		
1995	Pickett County		Harriman	Science Hill		
1994	Battle Ground Academy		Sweetwater	Science Hill		
1993	Battle Ground Academy		David Lipscomb	Fairley		
1992	Middleton		Union City	Brainerd		
1991	Martin Luther King-Nashville		Kingsbury	Hamilton		
1990	Pickett County		Union City	Science Hill		
1989	East Robertson		Bolton	Franklin		
1988	East Robertson		Memphis East	Brainerd		
1987	East Robertson		Austin East	Christian Brothers		
1986	Westside		Obion County	Westwood		
1985	Bolton		Austin East	Whitehaven		
1984	Greenfield		Kirby	Brainerd		
1983	East Robertson		Memphis East	Melrose		
1982	Friendship		Memphis East	Memphis Central		
1981	Bolton		Memphis Central	Nashville Pearl		
1980	Middleton		Trezevant	Memphis Northside		
1979	Bolton		Memphis East	Memphis Northside		
1978	Bolton		Knoxville Holston	Melrose		
1977	Perry County		Treadwell	Austin East		
1976	Perry County		Humboldt	McGavock		
Year	Small Class			Large Class		
1975	Bolton			Memphis Northside		
1974	Happy Valley			Melrose		
1973	Collierville			Gallatin		
Year						
1972	Chattanooga Riverside					
1971	Nashville Cameron					
1970	Nashville Cameron					
1969	Chattanooga Riverside					
1968	Chattanooga Riverside					
1967	Alcoa					
1966	Nashville Pearl					
1965	Murfreesboro Central					
1964	Donelson					
1963	Oak Ridge					
1962	Bradley Central					
1961	Oak Ridge					
1960	Hampton					
1959	Alcoa					
1958	Lenoir City					
1957	Linden					
1956	Linden					
1955	Linden					
1954	Nashville West					
1953	Nashville DuPont					
1952	Selmer					
1951	Knoxville					
1950	Happy Valley					
1949	Humboldt					
1948	Nashville West					
1947	Soddy-Daisy					
1946	Nashville West					
1945	Dobyns Bennett					
1944	Nashville West					
1943	Chattanooga Central					
1942	Bradley Central					
1941	Knoxville					
1940	Bradley Central					
1939	Knoxville					
1938	Whitehaven					
1937	Bristol					
1932	Ramer					
1931	Chester County					
1930	Lenoir City					
1929	College Grove					
1928	Purdy					
1927	Nashville Cathedral					
1926	Montgomery Bell Academy					
1925	Hume Fogg					
1924	Montgomery Bell Academy					
1923	Hume Fogg					
1922	Hume Fogg					
1921	Hume Fogg					

==== Most state boys basketball championships ====
Team	Titles	Title Years (Winter)
Brentwood Academy	9	2003, 2004, 2005, 2006, 2015, 2016, 2017, 2018, 2023
Memphis East	8	1979, 1982, 1983, 1988, 1996, 2012, 2016, 2017
Montgomery Bell Academy	6	1924, 1926, 1998, 2000, 2001, 2021
Bolton	6	1975, 1978, 1979, 1981, 1985, 1989

==== Girls ====
Year	Class 1A	Class 2A	Class 3A	Class 4A	Division II A	Division II AA
2026	Richland	Huntingdon	Dyersburg	Sevier County	Providence Christian	Webb School of Knoxville
2025	Greenfield	Westview	Heritage	Bradley Central	Webb School - Bell Buckle	Webb School of Knoxville
2024	Pickett County	Gibson County	Dyersburg	Bradley Central	University School of Jackson	Knoxville Catholic
2023	McKenzie	Westview	Jackson South Side	Bradley Central	Webb School - Bell Buckle	Knoxville Catholic
2022	McKenzie	Westview	Upperman	Bearden	Webb School - Bell Buckle	Ensworth
Year	Class A		Class AA	Class AAA	Division II A	Division II AA
2021	Loretto		Macon County	Blackman	Webb School - Bell Buckle	Hutchison
2020	Did not play due to the COVID-19 pandemic.				Trinity Christian	Ensworth
2019	Gibson County		Cheatham County	Bradley Central	Providence Christian	Ensworth
2018	Greenfield		Upperman	Riverdale	Webb School of Knoxville	Brentwood Academy
2017	South Greene		Upperman	Riverdale	Northpoint Christian	Ensworth
2016	South Greene		East Nashville	Riverdale	Northpoint Christian	Brentwood Academy
2015	Middleton		Martin Luther King-Nashville	Blackman	Webb School of Knoxville	Brentwood Academy
2014	Union City		Elizabethton	Blackman	Webb School of Knoxville	Brentwood Academy
2013	Jackson County		Christ Presbyterian Academy	Riverdale	Franklin Road Academy	Ensworth
2012	Clay County		Christ Presbyterian Academy	Riverdale	Webb School of Knoxville	Girls Preparatory School
2011	Wayne County		McMinn Central	Memphis Central	Franklin Road Academy	Girls Preparatory School
2010	Jackson County		Gibson County	Riverdale	Harding Academy	Ensworth
2009	Clarkrange		Gibson County	Hillsboro	Bishop Byrne	Webb School of Knoxville
2008	Jackson County		Marshall County	Wilson Central	Lausanne	Ensworth
Year	Class A		Class AA	Class AAA	Division II	
2007	Gleason		Austin East	Riverdale	Webb School of Knoxville	
2006	Forrest		Hillcrest	Wilson Central	Brentwood Academy	
2005	Peabody		Chester County	Mt. Juliet	Harpeth Hall	
2004	Clarkrange		Livingston Academy	Shelbyville	Briarcrest	
2003	Peabody		Jackson County	Shelbyville	Harpeth Hall	
2002	Ezell Harding		Jackson County	Sevier County	Briarcrest	
2001	Wayne County		Jackson County	Shelbyville	Briarcrest	
2000	Bradford		Jackson County	Shelbyville	Girls Preparatory School	
1999	Gleason		Livingston Academy	Gallatin	Girls Preparatory School	
1998	Bradford		Grundy County	Lawrence County	Briarcrest	
Year	Class A		Class AA	Class AAA		
1997	Bradford		Hickman County	Oak Ridge		
1996	Bradford		Westview	Jackson Central-Merry		
1995	Clarkrange		Meigs County	Shelbyville		
1994	Oneida		Livingston Academy	Oak Ridge		
1993	Bradford		Meigs County	Coffee County		
1992	Gleason		South Greene	Shelbyville		
1991	Clarkrange		South Greene	Shelbyville		
1990	Clarkrange		Livingston Academy	Shelbyville		
1989	Pickett County		Cannon County	Shelbyville		
1988	Collinwood		South Greene	Oak Ridge		
1987	Greenback		South Greene	Gallatin		
1986	Frank Hughes		David Lipscomb	Shelbyville		
1985	Clarkrange		Humboldt	Melrose		
1984	Clarkrange		Alvin C. York	Brainerd		
1983	Clarkrange		Chattanooga City	Mt. Juliet		
1982	Bradford		Giles County	Smyrna		
1981	Polk County		Giles County	B.T. Washington		
1980	Pickett County		Marshall County	Nashville Pearl		
1979	Pickett County		Humboldt	Warren County		
1978	Pickett County		Chester County	Bolivar Central		
1977	Pickett County		Bolivar Central	Mt. Juliet		
1976	Trezevant (Carroll County)		Marshall County	Bradley Central		
Year	Small Class			Large Class		
1975	Ooltewah			Bradley Central		
1974	Trezevant (Carroll County)			Shelbyville		
1973	Jackson County			Bradley Central		
Year						
1972	Marshall County					
1971	Lebanon					
1970	Bradley Central					
1969	Franklin County					
1968	Waverly Central					
1967	Maryville Porter					
1966	Maury Dandridge					
1965	Fayette County					
1964	Shelbyville					
1963	Maryville Porter					
1962	Bradley Central					
1961	Smyrna					
1960	Milan					
1959	Maryville Porter					
1958	Loretto					
1929	White County					
1928	Millington					
1927	Nashville Peabody					
1926	Hume Fogg					
1925	Union City					
1924	Murfreesboro					
1923	Nashville Central					
1922	Memphis Central					

==== Most state girls basketball championships ====
Team	Titles	Title Years (Winter)
Shelbyville	12	1964, 1974, 1986, 1989, 1990, 1991, 1992, 1995, 2000, 2001, 2003, 2004
Bradley Central	9	1962, 1970, 1973, 1975, 1976, 2019, 2023, 2024, 2025
Jackson County	8	1973, 2000, 2001, 2002, 2003, 2008, 2010, 2013
Clarkrange	8	1983, 1984, 1985, 1990, 1991, 1995, 2004, 2009
Webb School of Knoxville	8	2007, 2009, 2012, 2014, 2015, 2018, 2025, 2026

=== Bowling ===
==== Boys ====
Year	Division I	Division II
2026	Siegel	Christian Brothers
2025	Creek Wood	Columbia Academy
2024	Bartlett	Friendship Christian
2023	Hardin County	Columbia Academy
2022	Hardin County	Lipscomb Academy
2021	Hardin County	St. Benedict
2020	Bartlett	Notre Dame
2019	Smyrna	Friendship Christian
2018	Hardin County	Christian Brothers
2017	Hardin County	St. Benedict
2016	Columbia Central	St. Benedict
2015	Columbia Central	Friendship Christian
2014	Columbia Central	Friendship Christian
2013	Columbia Central	St. Benedict
2012	Soddy-Daisy	St. Benedict
2011	Smyrna	Battle Ground Academy
2010	Wilson Central	McCallie
2009	Smyrna	Christian Brothers
2008	Columbia Central	Pope John Paul II
2007	Hixson	Father Ryan
2006	Smyrna	McCallie
2005	Smyrna	McCallie
2004	Hendersonville	Christian Brothers
2003	Hendersonville	Christian Brothers
2002	Hendersonville	Baylor

==== Most state boys bowling championships ====
Team	Titles	Title Years (Fall)
Christian Brothers	5	2003, 2004, 2009, 2018, 2026
Smyrna	5	2005, 2006, 2009, 2011, 2019
Columbia Central	5	2008, 2013, 2014, 2015, 2016
St. Benedict	5	2012, 2013, 2016, 2017, 2021
Hardin County	5	2017, 2018, 2021, 2022, 2023

==== Girls ====
Year	Division I	Division II
2026	Hardin County	Lipscomb Academy
2025	Hardin County	St. Agnes
2024	Hardin County	Friendship Christian
2023	Hardin County	Friendship Christian
2022	Hardin County	Friendship Christian
2021	Hardin County	Friendship Christian
2020	Hardin County	Lipscomb Academy
2019	Hardin County	Friendship Christian
2018	Hardin County	Friendship Christian
2017	Hardin County	St. Agnes
2016	Hardin County	St. Agnes
2015	Hardin County	St. Benedict
2014	Hardin County	St. Benedict
2013	Alvin C. York	St. Agnes
2012	Hardin County	Girls Preparatory School
2011	Hardin County	St. Agnes
2010	Wilson Central	St. Agnes
2009	Hardin County	St. Benedict
2008	Hendersonville	St. Benedict
2007	Hardin County	St. Benedict
2006	Hixson	St. Benedict
2005	Walker Valley	St. Benedict
2004	Columbia Central	Elliston
2003	Mt. Juliet	Elliston
2002	Mt. Juliet	Elliston

==== Most state girls bowling championships ====
Team	Titles	Title Years (Fall)
Hardin County	17	2007, 2009, 2011, 2012, 2014, 2015, 2016, 2017, 2018, 2019, 2020, 2021, 2022, 2023, 2024, 2025, 2026
St. Benedict	7	2005, 2006, 2007, 2008, 2009, 2014, 2015
St. Agnes	6	2010, 2011, 2013, 2016, 2017, 2025
Friendship	6	2018, 2019, 2021, 2022, 2023, 2024
Elliston	3	2002, 2003, 2004
Mt. Juliet	2	2002, 2003

=== Wrestling ===
==== Boys ====
Year	Class A	Class AA	Division II
2026	Soddy-Daisy	Cleveland	McCallie
2025	Soddy-Daisy	Cleveland	Baylor
2024	Soddy-Daisy	Cleveland	McCallie
2023	Knoxville Halls	Cleveland	Baylor
2022	Greeneville	Cleveland	Baylor
Year	Class A-AA	Class AAA	Division II
2021	Pigeon Forge	Cleveland	Baylor
2020	Pigeon Forge	Cleveland	Baylor
2019	Pigeon Forge	Cleveland	Baylor
2018	Gibbs	Cleveland	Christian Brothers
2017	Pigeon Forge	Bradley Central	Father Ryan
2016	Pigeon Forge	Bradley Central	Father Ryan
2015	Pigeon Forge	Cleveland	Father Ryan
2014	Hixson	Cleveland	Father Ryan
Year	Division I		Division II
2013	Cleveland		Christian Brothers
2012	Soddy-Daisy		Father Ryan
2011	Cleveland		Baylor
2010	Bradley Central		Baylor
2009	Bradley Central		Father Ryan
2008	Bradley Central		Baylor; Father Ryan (tie)
2007	Soddy-Daisy		Baylor
2006	Soddy-Daisy		Baylor
2005	Bradley Central		Baylor
2004	Bradley Central		Baylor
2003	Bradley Central		Father Ryan
2002	Bradley Central		Baylor
2001	Bradley Central		Baylor
2000	Clarksville		Father Ryan
1999	Bradley Central		Baylor
1998	Bradley Central		Father Ryan
Year			
1997	John Overton		
1996	John Overton		
1995	Red Bank		
1994	Cleveland		
1993	McCallie		
1992	McCallie		
1991	McCallie		
1990	McCallie		
1989	Franklin		
1988	Father Ryan		
1987	Father Ryan		
1986	McCallie		
1985	McCallie		
1984	East Ridge		
1983	East Ridge		
1982	McCallie		
1981	Baylor		
1980	Cleveland		
1979	Baylor		
1978	Baylor		
1977	Father Ryan		
1976	McCallie		
1975	East Ridge		
1974	Father Ryan		
1973	Hixson		
1972	East Ridge		
1971	Father Ryan		
1970	Notre Dame		
1969	Father Ryan		
1968	Notre Dame		
1967	East Ridge		
1966	East Ridge		
1965	Red Bank		
1964	Red Bank		
1963	Red Bank		
1962	Baylor		
1961	Chattanooga City		

==== Most state boys wrestling championships ====
Team	Titles	Title Years (Winter)
Baylor	20	1962, 1978, 1979, 1981, 1999, 2001, 2002, 2004, 2005, 2006, 2007, 2008, 2010, 2011, 2019, 2020, 2021, 2022, 2023, 2025
Father Ryan	16	1969, 1971, 1974, 1977, 1987, 1988, 1998, 2000, 2003, 2008, 2009, 2012, 2014, 2015, 2016, 2017
Cleveland	15	1980, 1994, 2011, 2013, 2014, 2015, 2018, 2019, 2020, 2021, 2022, 2023, 2024, 2025, 2026
Bradley Central	12	1998, 1999, 2001, 2002, 2003, 2004, 2005, 2008, 2009, 2010, 2016, 2017
McCallie	10	1976, 1982, 1985, 1986, 1990, 1991, 1992, 1993, 2024, 2026

==== Girls ====
Year	School
2026	Cleveland
2025	West Creek
2024	Cleveland
2023	Cleveland
2022	Clarksville
2021	Northwest
2020	Rossview
2019	Rossview
2018	Rossview
2017	Northwest
2016	Northeast
2015	Science Hill

==== Most state girls wrestling championships ====
Team	Titles	Title Years (Fall)
Cleveland	3	2023, 2024, 2026
Rossview	3	2018, 2019, 2020
Northwest	2	2017, 2021

== Spring ==
=== Baseball ===
Year	Class 1A	Class 2A	Class 3A	Class 4A	Division II A	Division II AA
2026	Richland	Milan	Crockett County	Farragut	Lakeway Christian	Christ Presbyterian Academy
2025	Eagleville	Lakeland Prep	Greeneville	Farragut	Columbia Academy	Lipscomb Academy
2024	Eagleville	Loretto	Tullahoma	Farragut	Columbia Academy	Briarcrest
2023	Eagleville	Union County	Greeneville	Farragut	Northpoint	Knoxville Catholic
2022	Eagleville	Watertown	Upperman	Farragut	Goodpasture	McCallie
Year	Class A		Class AA	Class AAA	Division II A	Division II AA
2021	East Robertson		Gibbs	Science Hill	Christ Presbyterian Academy	Baylor
2020	Did not play due to the COVID-19 pandemic.					
2019	Greenback		Covington	Farragut	Christian Academy of Knoxville	Baylor
2018	Columbia Academy		Greeneville	Rossview	Christian Academy of Knoxville	Baylor
2017	Loretto		Christian Academy of Knoxville	Brentwood	Evangelical Christian School	Brentwood Academy
2016	Scotts Hill		Spring Hill	Siegel	Franklin Road Academy	Christian Brothers
2015	Knoxville Grace		Christ Presbyterian Academy	Hardin Valley	St. George's	Christian Brothers
2014	Jackson Christian		Christian Academy of Knoxville	Farragut	University School of Jackson	McCallie
2013	Friendship Christian		Pigeon Forge	Collierville	Evangelical Christian School	Christian Brothers
2012	Decatur County Riverside		Goodpasture	Arlington	University School of Jackson	Battle Ground Academy
2011	Decatur County Riverside		David Lipscomb	Farragut	Evangelical Christian School	Christian Brothers
2010	Decatur County Riverside		Gibbs	Farragut	Webb School of Knoxville	Brentwood Academy
2009	Summertown		Dyer County	Farragut	Southern Baptist Educational Center	Brentwood Academy
2008	Jackson Christian		Goodpasture	Farragut	Harding Academy	Brentwood Academy
Year	Class A		Class AA	Class AAA	Division II	
2007	Friendship Christian		Goodpasture	Bartlett	Christian Brothers	
2006	McKenzie		Covington	Farragut	Baylor	
2005	No Champion (Note: University School of Jackson was forced to forfeit its state championship due to an ineligle player on their roster.)		David Lipscomb	Houston	Christian Brothers	
2004	Goodpasture		Milan	Farragut	Montgomery Bell Academy	
2003	Davidson Academy		Ripley	Farragut	Baylor	
2002	University School of Jackson		Lexington	LaVergne	Father Ryan	
2001	University School of Jackson		David Lipscomb	Germantown	Christian Brothers	
2000	Franklin Road Academy		White House	Oakland	Christian Brothers	
1999	University School of Jackson		Covington	Oakland	Goodpasture	
1998	Coalfield		David Lipscomb	Science Hill	Evangelical Christian School	
Year	Class A		Class AA	Class AAA		
1997	Goodpasture		Brentwood Academy	Christian Brothers		
1996	South Pittsburg		Evangelical Christian School	Houston		
1995	Goodpasture		Unicoi County	Germantown		
1994	Columbia Academy		Marshall County	Bradley Central		
1993	Upperman		Marshall County	Montgomery Bell Academy		
1992	Summertown		Unicoi County	Warren County		
1991	Upperman		Unicoi County	Munford		
1990	Donelson Christian Academy		Tullahoma	Knoxville Central		
1989	Ezell Harding		Evangelical Christian School	Maryville		
1988	Franklin Road Academy		Goodpasture	John Overton		
1987	Dresden		Chattanooga Central	Sullivan South		
1986	Memphis Sky View		David Lipscomb	McGavock		
1985	Webb School of Knoxville		Chattanooga Central	Sullivan North		
1984	Franklin Road Academy		Unicoi County	McGavock		
1983	Madisonville		Marshall County	Sullivan North		
1982	David Lipscomb		Beech	Farragut		
1981	Memphis Sky View		White Station	Germantown		
1980	Lookout Valley		Bishop Byrne	Maplewood		
1979	Sullivan West		Notre Dame	Antioch		
1978	David Lipscomb		Goodlettsville	Montgomery Bell Academy		
1977	Lookout Valley		Hillwood	Soddy-Daisy		
Year	School					
1976	McCallie					
1975	McGavock					
1974	Tullahoma					
1973	Knoxville Central					
1972	Montgomery Bell Academy					
1971	John Overton					
1970	Glencliff					
1969	Treadwell					
1968	Franklin County					
1967	Tennessee					
1966	Kingsbury					
1965	Brainerd					
1964	Christian Brothers					
1963	Science Hill					
1962	Science Hill					
1961	Christian Brothers					
1960	Chattanooga Central					
1959	Christian Brothers					
1958	Memphis Central					
1957	Dobyns Bennett					
1956	Chattanooga Central					
1955	Chattanooga Central					
1954	Memphis South Side					
1953	Memphis Central					
1952	Dobyns Bennett					
1951	Memphis South Side					
1950	Chattanooga City					
1949	Nashville North					
1948	Christian Brothers					
1947	Science Hill					

==== Most state baseball championships ====
Team	Titles	Title Years (Spring)
Farragut	15	1982, 2003, 2004, 2006, 2008, 2009, 2010, 2011, 2014, 2019, 2022, 2023, 2024, 2025, 2026
Christian Brothers	13	1948, 1959, 1961, 1964, 1997, 2000, 2001, 2005, 2007, 2011, 2013, 2015, 2016
Goodpasture	9	1988, 1995, 1997, 1999, 2004, 2007, 2008, 2012, 2022
David Lipscomb	7	1978, 1982, 1986, 1998, 2001, 2005, 2011
Evangelical Christian School	6	1989, 1996, 1998, 2011, 2013, 2017

=== Softball ===
Year	Class 1A	Class 2A	Class 3A	Class 4A	Division II A	Division II AA
2026	Eagleville	Community	Alcoa	Stewarts Creek	Tipton-Rosemark	Chattanooga Christian
2025	Eagleville	Liberty Creek	Gibbs	Walker Valley	Donelson Christian Academy	Chattanooga Christian
2024	Gordonsville	Liberty Creek	Gibbs	Dobyns Bennett	Silverdale	Baylor
2023	Gordonsville	Westview	McNairy Central	Green Hill	Silverdale	Baylor
2022	Eagleville	Alcoa	Lexington	Farragut	Columbia Academy	Baylor
Year	Class A		Class AA	Class AAA	Division II A	Division II AA
2021	Summertown		Forrest	Farragut	Columbia Academy	Baylor
2020	Did not play due to the COVID-19 pandemic.					
2019	Columbia Academy		Forrest	Jefferson County	King's Academy	Baylor
2018	Summertown		Meigs County	Powell	Silverdale	Baylor
2017	Meigs County		Christian Academy of Knoxville	Gibbs	King's Academy	Baylor
2016	Meigs County		Christian Academy of Knoxville	Dickson County	King's Academy	Baylor
2015	Forrest		Greeneville	Wilson Central	Friendship Christian	Baylor
2014	Gordonsville		Dyersburg	Dickson County	Tipton-Rosemark	Girls Preparatory School
2013	Richland		Lexington	Smyrna	Ezell Harding	Baylor
2012	Chattanooga Grace		Gibbs	Soddy-Daisy	University School of Jackson	Baylor
2011	Decatur County Riverside		Goodpasture	Beech	Tipton-Rosemark	Baylor
2010	Trinity Christian		Camden	Soddy-Daisy	University School of Jackson	Girls Preparatory School
2009	Trinity Christian		Unicoi County	Riverdale	Davidson Academy	Girls Preparatory School
2008	Forrest		Goodpasture	Ooltewah	Davidson Academy	Girls Preparatory School
Year	Class A		Class AA	Class AAA	Division II	
2007	Trinity Christian		Goodpasture	Soddy-Daisy	Girls Preparatory School	
2006	Trinity Christian		Goodpasture	Soddy-Daisy	Father Ryan	
2005	Goodpasture		Marshall County	Red Bank	Baylor	
2004	Goodpasture		Lenoir City	Beech	Baylor	
2003	Goodpasture		Greenbrier	Soddy-Daisy	Baylor	
2002	Davidson Academy		Unicoi County	Dickson County	Brentwood Academy	
2001	Ezell Harding		Giles County	Beech	Girls Preparatory School	
2000	Ezell Harding		Gibbs	Soddy-Daisy	Girls Preparatory School	
1999	Ezell Harding		Gibbs	Soddy-Daisy	Goodpasture	
1998	Ezell Harding		Gibbs	East Ridge	Girls Preparatory School	
Year	Class A		Class AA	Class AAA		
1997	Ezell Harding		David Lipscomb	Beech		
1996	Goodpasture		Waverly Central	East Ridge		
1995	Ezell Harding		Notre Dame	Father Ryan		
1994	Ezell Harding		David Lipscomb	Baylor		
1993	Ezell Harding		David Lipscomb	Baylor		
1992	Ezell Harding		Brentwood Academy	Ooltewah		
1991	Ezell Harding		Brentwood Academy	Soddy-Daisy		
1990	Ezell Harding		Sequatchie County	Ooltewah		
1989	Boyd Buchanan		Powell	Brentwood		
1988	Ezell Harding		Gibbs	Hixson		
1987	Boyd Buchanan		Gibbs	Hixson		
1986	Memphis Sky View		Gibbs	Mt. Juliet		
1985	Memphis Sky View		Chattanooga Central	Germantown		
1984	Memphis Sky View		Gibbs	Hixson		
1983	Memphis Sky View		Gibbs	Hixson		
1982	Memphis Oakhaven Baptist		Ooltewah	Farragut		
1981	Westmoreland		Giles County	Red Bank		
1980	Memphis Sky View		Giles County	Morristown East		
1979	Richland		Giles County	East Ridge		

==== Most state softball championships ====
Team	Titles	Title Years (Spring)
Baylor	17	1993, 1994, 2003, 2004, 2005, 2011, 2012, 2013, 2015, 2016, 2017, 2018, 2019, 2021, 2022, 2023, 2024
Ezell Harding	13	1988, 1990, 1991, 1992, 1993, 1994, 1995, 1997, 1998, 1999, 2000, 2001, 2013
Gibbs	12	1983, 1984, 1986, 1987, 1988, 1998, 1999, 2000, 2012, 2017, 2024, 2025
Goodpasture	9	1996, 1999, 2003, 2004, 2005, 2006, 2007, 2008, 2011
Soddy-Daisy	8	1991, 1999, 2000, 2003, 2006, 2007, 2010, 2012
Girls Preparatory School	8	1998, 2000, 2001, 2007, 2008, 2009, 2010, 2014

=== Boys Soccer ===
Year	Class A	Class AA	Class AAA	Division II A	Division II AA
2026	Independence Acadamey	Station Camp	Ravenwood	Knoxville Grace	McCallie
2025	Independence Acadamey	Station Camp	Hardin Valley	Knoxville Grace	Montgomery Bell Academy
2024	Gatlinburg-Pittman	South Doyle	Bearden	Boyd Buchanan	McCallie
2023	Madison Academic	Valor College Prep	Brentwood	Lausanne	Montgomery Bell Academy
2022	Gatlinburg-Pittman	Page	Brentwood	Franklin Grace	Baylor
2021	Austin East	Sevier County	Houston	Webb School of Knoxville	Christian Brothers
2020	Did not play due to the COVID-19 pandemic.				
2019	Franklin Grace	Greeneville	Bearden	Evangelical Christian School	McCallie
2018	Gatlinburg-Pittman	Greeneville	Station Camp	Lausanne	Baylor
Year	Class A-AA		Class AAA	Division II A	Division II AA
2017	Greeneville		Station Camp	Lausanne	McCallie
2016	Christian Academy of Knoxville		Bearden	Webb School of Knoxville	Christian Brothers
2015	Christ Presbyterian Academy		Houston	Webb School of Knoxville	Montgomery Bell Academy
2014	Christ Presbyterian Academy		Franklin	Battle Ground Academy	Christian Brothers
2013	Christian Academy of Knoxville		Franklin	St. George's	Father Ryan
2012	Christian Academy of Knoxville		Brentwood	Webb School of Knoxville	Baylor
2011	Chattanooga Christian		Hardin Valley	Evangelical Christian School	Father Ryan
2010	Boyd Buchanan		Hendersonville	Evangelical Christian School	Christian Brothers
2009	Christian Academy of Knoxville		Farragut	University School of Nashville	Christian Brothers
2008	Knoxville Catholic		Brentwood	St. George's	Father Ryan
Year	Class A-AA		Class AAA	Division II	
2007	Christian Academy of Knoxville		Farragut	Baylor	
2006	Christian Academy of Knoxville		Bearden	Battle Ground Academy	
2005	Christian Academy of Knoxville		Brentwood	Father Ryan	
2004	Christian Academy of Knoxville		Farragut	Memphis University School	
2003	Christian Academy of Knoxville		Farragut	Christian Brothers	
2002	Ridgeway		Bearden	Christian Brothers	
2001	Chattanooga Christian		Bearden	Christian Brothers	
2000	Ridgeway		Houston	Baylor	
1999	Christ Presbyterian Academy		Houston	McCallie	
1998	Lenoir City		Hendersonville	Father Ryan	
Year	Class A-AA		Class AAA		
1997	Notre Dame		Baylor		
1996	Notre Dame		Houston		
Year	School				
1995	Brentwood				
1994	Houston				
1993	Houston				
1992	Christian Brothers				
1991	Christian Brothers				
1990	Christian Brothers				
1989	Hendersonville				
1988	Hixson				
1987	Farragut				

==== Most state boys soccer championships ====
Team	Titles	Title Years (Spring)
Christian Brothers	11	1990, 1991, 1992, 2001, 2002, 2003, 2009, 2010, 2014, 2016, 2021
Christian Academy of Knoxville	9	2003, 2004, 2005, 2006, 2007, 2009, 2012, 2013, 2016
Houston	7	1993, 1994, 1996, 1999, 2000, 2015, 2021
Baylor	6	1997, 2000, 2007, 2012, 2018, 2022
Bearden	6	2001, 2002, 2006, 2016, 2019, 2024
Brentwood	6	1995, 2005, 2008, 2012, 2022, 2023

=== Tennis ===
==== Boys ====
Year	Class A	Class AA	Division II A	Division II AA
2026	Merrol Hyde	Brentwood	Lausanne	Baylor
2025	Merrol Hyde	Hume-Fogg	Lausanne	Baylor
2024	University School Johnson City	Brentwood	Lausanne	McCallie
2023	Merrol Hyde	Collierville	Lausanne	McCallie
2022	Merrol Hyde	Collierville	Lausanne	McCallie
Year	Small Class	Large Class	Division II A	Division II AA
2021	Merrol Hyde	Ravenwood	Christ Presbyterian Academy	McCallie
2020	Did not play due to the COVID-19 pandemic.			
2019	L&N STEM	Brentwood	Webb School of Knoxville	McCallie
2018	Trinity Christian	Ravenwood	Webb School of Knoxville	Montgomery Bell Academy
Year	Class A-AA	Class AAA	Division II A	Division II AA
2017	Christian Academy of Knoxville	Tennessee	Webb School of Knoxville	Montgomery Bell Academy
2016	Lipscomb Academy	Tennessee	University School of Jackson	Baylor
2015	Knoxville Catholic	Tennessee	Webb School of Knoxville	Memphis University School
2014	Knoxville Catholic	Tennessee	Webb School of Knoxville	Memphis University School
2013	Christian Academy of Knoxville	Brentwood	Webb School of Knoxville	Memphis University School
2012	Unicoi County	Brentwood	University School of Nashville	Montgomery Bell Academy
2011	Christian Academy of Knoxville	Tennessee	Webb School of Knoxville	Montgomery Bell Academy
2010	Christian Academy of Knoxville	Brentwood	Webb School of Knoxville	Montgomery Bell Academy
2009	University School of Jackson	Science Hill	University School of Nashville	McCallie
2008	Knoxville Catholic	Science Hill	University School of Nashville	McCallie
Year	Class A-AA	Class AAA	Division II	
2007	University School of Jackson	Science Hill	McCallie	
2006	University School of Jackson	Siegel	McCallie	
2005	Chattanooga Christian	Brentwood	Memphis University School	
2004	Chattanooga Christian	Dobyns Bennett	Memphis University School	
2003	Chattanooga Christian	Dobyns Bennett	Montgomery Bell Academy	
2002	Chattanooga Christian	Science Hill	Memphis University School	
2001	Christian Academy of Knoxville	Bearden	Memphis University School	
2000	University School of Jackson	Bearden	Memphis University School	
1999	University School of Jackson	Bearden	Memphis University School	
1998	University School of Jackson	Bearden	Memphis University School	
Year	School			
1997	Baylor			
1996	Baylor			
1995	Montgomery Bell Academy			
1994	McCallie			
1993	Baylor			
1992	Memphis University School			
1991	McCallie			
1990	Baylor			
1989	Baylor			
1988	Baylor			
1987	Montgomery Bell Academy			
1986	Baylor			
1985	Memphis University School			
1984	Memphis University School			
1983	Baylor			
1982	Baylor			
1981	Germantown			
1980	Germantown			
1979	Baylor			
1978	Memphis University School			
1977	McCallie			
1976	McCallie			
1975	Baylor			
1974	Baylor			
1973	Baylor			
1972	David Lipscomb			
1971	Baylor			
1970	David Lipscomb			
1969	Memphis Central; David Lipscomb (tie)			
1968	Memphis University School			
1967	Memphis University School			
1966	Montgomery Bell Academy			
1965	Montgomery Bell Academy			
1964	Memphis Central; Notre Dame (tie)			
1963	Oak Ridge; Notre Dame (tie)			
1962	David Lipscomb; Montgomery Bell Academy (tie)			
1941	Christian Brothers			
1940	Nashville West			

==== Most state boys tennis championships ====
Team	Titles	Title Years (Spring)
Baylor	17	1971, 1973, 1974, 1975, 1979, 1982, 1983, 1986, 1988, 1989, 1990, 1993, 1996, 1997, 2016, 2025, 2026
Memphis University School	16	1967, 1968, 1978, 1984, 1985, 1992, 1998, 1999, 2000, 2001, 2002, 2004, 2005, 2013, 2014, 2015
McCallie School	13	1976, 1977, 1991, 1994, 2006, 2007, 2008, 2009, 2019, 2021, 2022, 2023, 2024
Montgomery Bell Academy	11	1962, 1965, 1966, 1987, 1995, 2003, 2010, 2011, 2012, 2017, 2018
Webb School of Knoxville	8	2010, 2011, 2013, 2014, 2015, 2017, 2018, 2019

==== Girls ====
Year	Class A	Class AA	Division II A	Division II AA
2026	Merrol Hyde	Brentwood	Lausanne	Baylor
2025	Summertown	Brentwood	Lausanne	Baylor
2024	Summertown	Brentwood	Lausanne	Knoxville Catholic
2023	Summertown	Science Hill	University School of Jackson	Knoxville Catholic
2022	Summertown	Brentwood	University School of Jackson	Knoxville Catholic
Year	Small Class	Large Class	Division II A	Division II AA
2021	Chattanooga Arts & Sciences	Science Hill	University School of Jackson	Knoxville Catholic
2020	Did not play due to the COVID-19 pandemic.			
2019	Summertown	Brentwood	Webb School of Knoxville	Baylor
2018	Signal Mountain	Brentwood	Webb School of Knoxville	Baylor
Year	Class A-AA	Class AAA	Division II A	Division II AA
2017	Knoxville Catholic	Brentwood	Webb School of Knoxville	Baylor
2016	Knoxville Catholic	Brentwood	Webb School of Knoxville	Baylor
2015	Notre Dame	Ravenwood	Webb School of Knoxville	Baylor
2014	Christian Academy of Knoxville	Ravenwood	Webb School of Knoxville	Baylor
2013	Chattanooga Christian	Ravenwood	Webb School of Knoxville	Baylor
2012	Notre Dame	Ravenwood	Webb School of Knoxville	Baylor
2011	Christ Presbyterian Academy	Ravenwood	Webb School of Knoxville	Baylor
2010	Christ Presbyterian Academy	Ravenwood	Webb School of Knoxville	Girls Preparatory School
2009	University School of Jackson	Science Hill	St. George's	Hutchison
2008	Chattanooga Christian	Siegel	St. Andrews-Sewanee	Girls Preparatory School
Year	Class A-AA	Class AAA	Division II	
2007	Chattanooga Christian	Houston	Girls Preparatory School	
2006	Chattanooga Christian	Houston	Girls Preparatory School	
2005	Chattanooga Christian	Dobyns Bennett	Webb School of Knoxville	
2004	David Lipscomb	Dobyns Bennett	Webb School of Knoxville	
2003	Donelson Christian Academy	Brentwood	St. Agnes	
2002	Chattanooga Christian	Brentwood	Webb School of Knoxville	
2001	Chattanooga Christian	Brentwood	St. Mary's	
2000	Chattanooga Christian	Knoxville West	Baylor	
1999	Chattanooga Christian	Knoxville West	Baylor	
1998	University School of Jackson	Oak Ridge	Girls Preparatory School	
Year	School			
1997	Oak Ridge			
1996	Baylor			
1995	Brentwood Academy			
1994	University School of Nashville			
1993	Baylor			
1992	St. Mary's			
1991	St. Mary's			
1990	St. Mary's			
1989	St. Mary's			
1988	St. Mary's			
1987	Harpeth Hall			
1986	Harpeth Hall			
1985	Girls Preparatory School			
1984	Girls Preparatory School			
1983	Briarcrest			
1982	Girls Preparatory School			
1981	Briarcrest			
1980	Ridgeway			
1979	Dobyns Bennett			
1978	Dobyns Bennett			
1977	Harpeth Hall			
1976	Red Bank			
1975	Red Bank			
1974	Girls Preparatory School			
1973	Girls Preparatory School			
1972	Webb School of Knoxville			
1971	Girls Preparatory School; Knoxville West (tie)			
1970	Webb School of Knoxville			
1969	Two Rivers			
1968	Hillsboro			
1967	Knoxville West			
1966	David Lipscomb			
1965	Webb School of Knoxville			
1964	David Lipscomb			

==== Most state girls tennis championships ====
Team	Titles	Title Years (Spring)
Webb School of Knoxville	16	1965, 1970, 1972, 2002, 2004, 2005, 2010, 2011, 2012, 2013, 2014, 2015, 2016, 2017, 2018, 2019
Baylor	15	1993, 1996, 1999, 2000, 2011, 2012, 2013, 2014, 2015, 2016, 2017, 2018, 2019, 2025, 2026
Brentwood	11	2001, 2002, 2003, 2016, 2017, 2018, 2019, 2022, 2024, 2025, 2026
Girls Preparatory School	11	1971, 1973, 1974, 1982, 1984, 1985, 1998, 2006, 2007, 2008, 2010
Chattanooga Christian School	9	1999, 2000, 2001, 2002, 2005, 2006, 2007, 2008, 2013

=== Track and Field ===
==== Boys ====
Year	Class A	Class AA	Class AAA	Division II A	Division II AA
2026	Tyner	Millington	Brentwood	Battle Ground Academy	McCallie
2025	Union City	Greeneville	Farragut	Battle Ground Academy	Montgomery Bell Academy
2024	Memphis East	Greeneville	Brentwood	Franklin Road Academy	McCallie
2023	Pearl Cohn	Page	Brentwood	Franklin Road Academy	Christian Brothers
2022	Alcoa	Greeneville	Memphis Central	Franklin Road Academy	Christian Brothers
Year	Small Class		Large Class	Division II A	Division II AA
2021	Alcoa		Bartlett	Harding Academy	McCallie
2020	Did not play due to the COVID-19 pandemic.				
2019	Pearl Cohn		Brentwood	Harding Academy	Brentwood Academy
2018	Pearl Cohn		Brentwood	Harding Academy	Brentwood Academy
Year	Class A-AA		Class AAA	Division II	
2017	Knoxville Catholic		Memphis Central	Brentwood Academy	
2016	Knoxville Catholic		Memphis Central	Brentwood Academy	
2015	Pearl Cohn		Memphis Central	Brentwood Academy	
2014	Greeneville		Houston	Memphis University School	
2013	Martin Luther King-Nashville		White Station	Brentwood Academy	
2012	Sheffield		Brentwood	Brentwood Academy	
2011	Stratford		Brentwood	Brentwood Academy	
2010	Martin Luther King-Nashville		Brentwood	Christian Brothers	
2009	Martin Luther King-Nashville		Cordova	Memphis University School	
2008	David Lipscomb		Brentwood	Brentwood Academy	
2007	Brainerd		Brentwood	Brentwood Academy	
2006	Trezevant		Hamilton	Brentwood Academy	
2005	Martin Luther King-Nashville		Houston	Brentwood Academy	
2004	Raleigh Egypt		Cordova	Brentwood Academy	
2003	Franklin Road Academy		Melrose	Brentwood Academy	
2002	Franklin Road Academy		Hunters Lane	Baylor	
2001	Franklin Road Academy		Hunters Lane	Montgomery Bell Academy	
2000	Brainerd		Farragut	Baylor	
1999	Brainerd		Farragut; Memphis Central (tie)	Montgomery Bell Academy	
1998	Franklin Road Academy		Farragut	Montgomery Bell Academy	
Year	Class A-AA		Class AAA		
1997	Memphis University School		Memphis Central		
1996	Brentwood Academy		Hunters Lane		
1995	Memphis University School		Memphis Central		
1994	Memphis University School		Memphis Central		
1993	Brentwood Academy		Hunters Lane		
1992	Memphis East		Cleveland		
1991	Brentwood Academy		Hamilton		
1990	Brentwood Academy		John Overton		
1989	Brentwood Academy		Hunters Lane		
1988	Brentwood Academy		Wooddale		
1987	Brentwood Academy; Austin East		Wooddale		
1986	Westside		Wooddale		
1985	Howard		Whites Creek		
1984	Memphis Overton; Goodlettsville (tie)		Oakland		
1983	Brentwood Academy		Whites Creek		
Year	Class A	Class AA	Class AAA		
1982	Tennessee Preparatory School	Brentwood Academy	Hillsboro		
1981	Westside	Brentwood Academy	Austin East; Whites Creek (tie)		
1980	Webb School of Knoxville	Brentwood Academy	Hillsboro		
Year	School				
1979	Dobyns Bennett				
1978	Westwood				
1977	Cleveland				
1976	Maplewood				
1975	Bearden				
1974	Hendersonville				
1973	Wooddale				
1972	Dobyns Bennett				
1971	Dobyns Bennett				
1970	Memphis South Side				
1969	Memphis South Side				
1968	Manassas				
1967	Booker T. Washington				
1966	Nashville Isaac Litton				
1965	Melrose				
1964	Christian Brothers				
1963	Memphis Catholic				
1962	Oak Ridge				
1961	Oak Ridge				
1960	Nashville East				
1959	Nashville East				
1958	Oak Ridge				
1957	Oak Ridge				
1956	Oak Ridge				
1955	Memphis Central				
1954	Memphis Central				
1953	Oak Ridge				
1952	Oak Ridge				
1951	Whitehaven				
1950	Knoxville				
1949	Whitehaven				
1948	Dobyns Bennett				
1947	Memphis Central				
1942	Memphis Central				
1941	Dobyns Bennett				
1940	Dobyns Bennett				
1939	Memphis Central				
1938	Knoxville				
1937	Dobyns Bennett				
1936	Knoxville				
1935	Science Hill; Nashville East (tie)				
1934	Knoxville				
1933	Knoxville				

==== Most state boys track and field championships ====
Team	Titles	Title Years (Spring)
Brentwood Academy	25	1980, 1981, 1982, 1983, 1987, 1988, 1989, 1990, 1991, 1993, 1996, 2003, 2004, 2005, 2006, 2007, 2008, 2011, 2012, 2013, 2015, 2016, 2017, 2018, 2019
Memphis Central	13	1939, 1942, 1947, 1954, 1955, 1994, 1995, 1997, 1999, 2015, 2016, 2017, 2022
Brentwood	10	2007, 2008, 2010, 2011, 2012, 2018, 2019, 2023, 2024, 2026
Dobyns Bennett	7	1937, 1940, 1941, 1948, 1971, 1972, 1979
Oak Ridge	7	1952, 1953, 1956, 1957, 1958, 1961, 1962
Franklin Road Academy	7	1998, 2001, 2002, 2003, 2022, 2023, 2024

==== Girls ====
Year	Class A	Class AA	Class AAA	Division II A	Division II AA
2026	Pearl Cohn	Station Camp	Collierville	Franklin Road Academy	Webb School of Knoxville
2025	Liberty Creek	Signal Mountain	Collierville	Harding Academy	Webb School of Knoxville
2024	East Nashville; Memphis East (tie)	Signal Mountain	Collierville	Franklin Road Academy	Webb School of Knoxville
2023	Alcoa	Martin Luther King-Nashville	Memphis Central	Webb School - Bell Buckle	Harpeth Hall
2022	Pearl Cohn	Signal Mountain	Brentwood	University School of Nashville	Harpeth Hall
Year	Small Class		Large Class	Division II A	Division II AA
2021	Signal Mountain		Brentwood	Harding Academy	Ensworth
2020	Did not play due to the COVID-19 pandemic.				
2019	East Nashville		Whitehaven	Webb School of Knoxville	Ensworth
2018	East Nashville		Southwind	Harding Academy	Brentwood Academy
Year	Class A-AA		Class AAA	Division II	
2017	East Nashville		Whitehaven	Brentwood Academy	
2016	Signal Mountain		Whitehaven	Harpeth Hall	
2015	Signal Mountain		Whitehaven	Ensworth	
2014	Signal Mountain		Northeast	Harpeth Hall	
2013	Lipscomb Academy		Northeast	Brentwood Academy	
2012	Martin Luther King-Nashville		Hardin Valley	Brentwood Academy	
2011	Martin Luther King-Nashville		Knoxville West	Baylor	
2010	Martin Luther King-Nashville		Knoxville West	Baylor	
2009	Howard		Science Hill	Baylor	
2008	Pearl Cohn		Knoxville West	Baylor	
2007	Austin East		White Station	Girls Preparatory School	
2006	Mitchell		Knoxville West	Girls Preparatory School	
2005	Mitchell		Brentwood	Girls Preparatory School	
2004	Hume Fogg		Brentwood	Harpeth Hall	
2003	Ridgeway		Brentwood	Harpeth Hall	
2002	Ridgeway		Brentwood	Harpeth Hall	
2001	Ridgeway		Memphis East	Harpeth Hall	
2000	Anderson County		Farragut	Harpeth Hall	
1999	Brainerd		Memphis East	Baylor	
1998	Hume Fogg		Whitehaven	Baylor	
Year	Class A-AA		Class AAA		
1997	Tyner		Memphis East		
1996	Harpeth Hall		Memphis East		
1995	Harpeth Hall		Dobyns Bennett		
1994	Harpeth Hall		Farragut		
1993	Memphis East		Farragut		
1992	Harpeth Hall		Farragut		
1991	Harpeth Hall		Farragut		
1990	Memphis East		Whites Creek		
1989	Memphis East		Wooddale		
1988	Austin East		Oak Ridge		
1987	Austin East		Whites Creek		
1986	Austin East		Whites Creek		
1985	Collierville		John Overton		
1984	Howard		Melrose		
1983	Girls Preparatory School		Melrose		
Year	Class A	Class AA	Class AAA		
1982	Memphis Prep	Girls Preparatory School	Whites Creek		
1981	Tennessee Preparatory School	Harpeth Hall	Memphis Northside		
1980	Evangelical Christian School	Harpeth Hall	Memphis Northside		
Year	School				
1979	Memphis Northside				
1978	Memphis South Side				
1977	Memphis South Side				
1976	Harpeth Hall				
1975	Harpeth Hall				
1974	Coffee County				

==== Most state girls track and field championships ====
Team	Titles	Title Years (Spring)
Harpeth Hall	18	1975, 1976, 1980, 1981, 1991, 1992, 1994, 1995, 1996, 2000, 2001, 2002, 2003, 2004, 2014, 2016, 2022, 2023
Memphis East	8	1989, 1990, 1993, 1996, 1997, 1999, 2001, 2024
Signal Mountain	7	2014, 2015, 2016, 2021, 2022, 2024, 2025
Baylor	6	1998, 1999, 2008, 2009, 2010, 2011
Brentwood	6	2002, 2003, 2004, 2005, 2021, 2022

=== Lacrosse ===
==== Boys ====
Year	Class A	Class AA	Division II A	Division II AA
2026	Knoxville West	Nolensville	Ensworth	McCallie
2025	Hillsboro	Nolensville	Christ Presbyterian Academy	Montgomery Bell Academy

==== Most state boys lacrosse championships ====
Team	Titles	Title Years (Spring)
Nolensville	2	2025, 2026

==== Girls ====
Year	Class A	Class AA	Division II A	Division II AA
2026	Page	Ravenwood	Evangelical Christian School	Ensworth
2025	Page	Brentwood	Evangelical Christian School	Harpeth Hall

==== Most state girls lacrosse championships ====
Team	Titles	Title Years (Spring)
Evangelical Christian School	2	2025, 2026
Page	2	2025, 2026

=== Flag Football ===
==== Girls ====
Year	Class A	Class AA
2026	Creek Wood	Ravenwood

== Unified Sports ==
=== Flag Football ===
Year	School
2026	Nashville Overton
2025	Hardin Valley

=== Bowling ===
Year	School
2026	Cleveland
2025	Kenwood
2024	Dobyns Bennett

=== Track and Field ===
Year	School
2026	Bartlett
2025	Bartlett
2024	
2023	Bartlett
2022	Bartlett
2021	Hardin Valley
2019	Hardin Valley
