= Bishop Byrne High School (Tennessee) =

Location
- 1475 East Shelby Drive; Memphis, (Shelby County), Tennessee 38116; United States; 35°1′8″N 90°0′55″W

Information
- Type: Private, Coeducational, college-preparatory school
- Motto: Fiat Lux Veritatis (Let there be the light of truth.)
- Religious affiliation: Roman Catholic Church
- Established: 1965
- Status: Closed
- Closed: 2013
- Oversight: Roman Catholic Diocese of Memphis
- School code: 431-480
- Grades: 7–12
- Colors: Red , Black , and White
- Athletics conference: TSSAA
- Mascot: Red Knight
- Accreditation: Southern Association of Colleges and Schools
- Website: https://web.archive.org/*/http://www.bishopbyrne.org/

Bishop Byrne High School was a private, Roman Catholic high school in Memphis, Tennessee. It was located in the Roman Catholic Diocese of Memphis.

== Background ==
Bishop Byrne was established in 1965 to serve students in the South Memphis area. It was named for Bishop Thomas Sebastian Byrne, Bishop of the Nashville Diocese in the early 20th century. Bishop Byrne students came from a large area across Tennessee, Mississippi and Arkansas. The mascot for the school was the Red Knight. Bishop Byrne was also the alma mater of Archbishop J. Peter Sartain.

== Closure ==
On January 24, 2013, Roman Catholic Bishop J. Terry Steib of the Diocese of Memphis announced that Bishop Byrne High would close at the end of the spring semester. The school had experienced declining enrollment in recent years and higher maintenance costs than Memphis Catholic High School, which it was to merge into. That year each school had an enrollment of fewer than 200 students.

Influence1, a private charter school foundation, purchased the former Bishop Byrne property from the Catholic Diocese of Memphis and planned to open three charter schools at the location.

== Athletics ==
Bishop Byrne competed in Division 2, Region A of the Tennessee Secondary School Athletic Association (TSSAA) along with:

- Davidson Academy (Nashville)
- First Assembly Christian School (Cordova)
- Kings Academy (Seymour)
- Lighthouse Christian (Millington)
- Memphis Catholic High School (Memphis, Tennessee)
- Tipton Rosemark Academy (Millington)
- Rossville Christian
- Northpoint Christian School (Southaven, Mississippi)
- St. Andrews (Sewanee)
- St. George's (Collierville)
