= Woodlawn High School (Alabama) =

Public high school in Birmingham, Alabama, United States

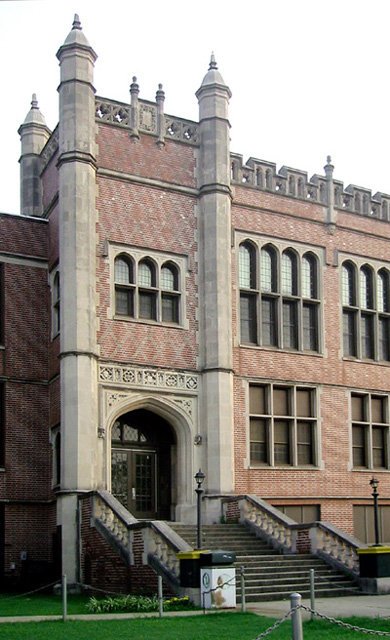

Location
- 5620 First Avenue North; Birmingham, Alabama 35212; United States; 33°32′31″N 86°45′07″W

Information
- School type: Public
- Established: 1916 (110 years ago)
- School district: Birmingham City Schools
- CEEB code: 010440
- Principal: Rameka David
- Teaching staff: 36.00 (FTE)
- Grades: 9–12
- Enrollment: 764 (2023–2024)
- Student to teacher ratio: 21.22
- Colors: Green and gold
- Athletics: AHSAA Class 6A
- Nickname: Colonels
- Website: www.bhamcityschools.org/o/wohs

Woodlawn High School is a four-year magnet high school in Birmingham, Alabama, United States. It is one of seven high schools in the Birmingham City School System. The school colors are green and gold, and the mascot is the Colonel. Woodlawn competes in AHSAA Class 6A athletics.

== Athletics ==
Woodlawn competes in AHSAA Class 6A athletics and currently fields teams in the following sports:

- Baseball
- Basketball
- Cross country
- Football
- Indoor track & field
- Outdoor track & field
- Volleyball

== Notable alumni ==
- Doyle Alexander (1968), former MLB player (Los Angeles Dodgers, Baltimore Orioles, New York Yankees, Texas Rangers, Atlanta Braves, San Francisco Giants, Toronto Blue Jays, Detroit Tigers)
- Fred Bohannon, former defensive back for the Pittsburgh Steelers
- Bobby Bowden (1948), former head football coach at Florida State University
- Jim Carns, member of the Alabama House of Representatives
- Gregg Carr, former linebacker for the Pittsburgh Steelers
- Tom Cochran, former fullback for the Washington Redskins
- Ed Daniel (2009), professional basketball player for Israeli team Maccabi Ashdod
- Karlos Dansby (2000), linebacker for the Arizona Cardinals, Miami Dolphins, and Cleveland Browns
- Chris Davis (2010), former Auburn University cornerback, involved in the game-ending play in Kick Bama Kick
- Vince Gibson, former head football coach at Kansas State University, University of Louisville, and Tulane University
- Harry Gilmer (1944), former halfback for the Washington Redskins and Detroit Lions; head coach for Detroit Lions
- Art Hanes, former mayor of Birmingham
- Tim Harris (transferred to Memphis Catholic), former linebacker for the Green Bay Packers, San Francisco 49ers, and Philadelphia Eagles
- Paul Hemphill, journalist and author
- Ricky Jones, former linebacker for the Cleveland Browns and Indianapolis Colts
- Anthony McHenry (2001), basketball player
- Tony Nathan, former running back for the Miami Dolphins
- Oliver Robinson (1978), member of the Alabama House of Representatives and former guard for the San Antonio Spurs
- Rickey Smiley, comedian, actor, and radio personality
- Travis Tidwell, former quarterback for the New York Giants
