= Casey Shaw =

American former basketball player (born 1975)

Grand Canyon Antelopes
- Title: Assistant coach
- League: Mountain West Conference

Personal information
- Born: July 20, 1975 (age 51) Lebanon, Ohio, U.S.
- Listed height: 6 ft 11 in (2.11 m)
- Listed weight: 255 lb (116 kg)

Career information
- High school: Lebanon (Lebanon, Ohio)
- College: Toledo (1994–1998)
- NBA draft: 1998: 2nd round, 37th overall pick
- Drafted by: Philadelphia 76ers
- Playing career: 1998–2011
- Position: Center
- Number: 30
- Coaching career: 2016–present

Career history

Playing
- 1998–1999: Philadelphia 76ers
- 1999–2000: Canturina Cantù
- 2000–2001: Telit Trieste
- 2001: Würth Roma
- 2001–2002: Adecco Milano
- 2003: Anwil Włocławek
- 2003: Ventspils
- 2003–2004: Melilla Baloncesto
- 2004–2005: Eurofiditalia Calabria
- 2005–2006: CB Gran Canaria
- 2006–2007: Tisettanta Cantù
- 2007–2008: Armani Jeans Milano
- 2008–2010: Scavolini Spar Pesaro
- 2010: Bancatercas Teramo

Coaching
- 2016–2019: Vanderbilt (assistant)
- 2019–2020: Davidson Academy
- 2020–present: Grand Canyon (assistant)

Career highlights
- 2× Second-team All-MAC (1997, 1998)
- Stats at NBA.com
- Stats at Basketball Reference

Joseph Casey Shaw (born July 20, 1975) is an American former basketball player who is an assistant coach for the Grand Canyon Antelopes of the Western Athletic Conference (WAC). Prior to this he was the head coach of the boys' varsity basketball team at Davidson Academy and before that an assistant coach for the Vanderbilt Commodores men's basketball team. Shaw played the center position. After a collegiate career at the University of Toledo, he was drafted 37th overall by the Philadelphia 76ers in the 1998 NBA draft.

== Early life ==
Shaw is the brother-in-law of current coach and former Valparaiso and NBA player Bryce Drew, and college coach Scott Drew. Shaw is also the son-in-law of former coach Homer Drew.

== College career ==
In college, Shaw starred for the Toledo Rockets, averaging 13.8 points and 7.7 rebounds per game for his career, including 14.2 ppg and 10 rpg his senior year.

== Professional career ==
Shaw was drafted as a 37th pick in the second round of the 1998 NBA draft by the Philadelphia 76ers. He appeared in nine games for the 76ers, scoring a total of two points.

He then moved to Italy in 2000, spending the majority of his career there, leading the league in rebounding in 2005. Shaw turned up for Olimpia Milano (two stints in 2002 and 2007), Cantù, Trieste, Virtus Roma, Reggio Calabria, Pesaro and Teramo in the Serie A.

He also played for Anwil Wloclawek in Poland, Gran Canaria and Melilla in Spain and Ventspils in Latvia.

On April 19, 2016, it was reported that Shaw would join his brother-in-law Bryce Drew as an assistant coach at Vanderbilt University. After Drew was fired, Shaw was hired as the boys' varsity basketball head coach at Davidson Academy.
