= Milan High School =

Milan High School can refer to:

- Milan High School (Indiana)
- Milan High School (Michigan)
- Milan High School (Tennessee)
