= John Pierce (basketball) =

American basketball player

Personal information
- Born: 1972 (age 53–54) Nashville, Tennessee, U.S.
- Listed height: 6 ft 6 in (1.98 m)
- Listed weight: 209 lb (95 kg)

Career information
- High school: Franklin Road Academy (Nashville, Tennessee)
- College: Lipscomb (1990–1994)
- NBA draft: 1994: undrafted
- Position: Center

Career history
- 1995: Stirling Senators
- 1997–1999: Toyotsu Fighting Eagles Nagoya

Career highlights
- SBL MVP (1995); 2× NAIA National Player of the Year (1993, 1994); 4× NAIA All-American (1991–1994); No. 50 retired by Lipscomb Bisons

John Daniel Pierce Jr. (born 1972) is an American former basketball center. He is the all-time/all-division/all-gender scoring leader in college basketball history with 4,230 points. He played college basketball at Lipscomb University.

== Early years ==
Pierce attended Franklin Road Academy. As a senior, he averaged 25.8 points and almost 10 rebounds per game, while receiving All-state and The Tennessean Metro Class A Player of the Year honors.

== College career ==
He accepted a basketball scholarship from NAIA Lipscomb University, to play under head coach Don Meyer.

Pierce was redshirted during the 1989-90 season. As a freshman, he posted 22 points and 9 rebounds in 21 minutes during his first college game. As a sophomore, he set the school single-game record with 54 points against Arkansas Baptist College.

As a junior, he was named the NAIA Player of the Year after leading the nation in scoring with an average of 31.9 points per contest. He also set the school's single-game points record (54) against Arkansas Baptist College.

As a senior, he broke his former teammate and roommate Phil Hutcheson's career scoring record of 4,106 points, to become the all-time/all-division scoring leader in college basketball history with 4,230 points.

Pierce graduated after helping his teams compile a 129-19 record, while qualifying for the NAIA tournament all four seasons and reaching a pair of Elite Eight appearances. He scored in double figures in every game that he played, while finishing with school records in career rebounds (1,497), field goals made (1,627) and free throws made (881).

In 2003, he was inducted into the Lipscomb Athletics Hall of Fame. His jersey number 50 was retired by the school. In 2003, he was inducted into the NAIA Hall of Fame. In 2012, he was named to the NAIA 75th Anniversary All-Star Team. In 2015, he was inducted into the Tennessee Sports Hall of Fame. In 2018, he was inducted into the Small College Basketball Hall of Fame.

== Professional career ==
In 1995, he signed with the Stirling Senators of the second-tier State Basketball League (SBL) in Australia, where he received the league's MVP award. In 1997, he signed with the Toyotsu Fighting Eagles Nagoya of the B.League in Japan. He also played professional basketball in France.

== Personal life ==
After his basketball career was over, he was hired as an assistant basketball coach at Brentwood Academy. In 2006, he was hired as the varsity boys' basketball head coach at his alma mater Franklin Road Academy. His teams have recorded over 300 wins and qualified for the D2A Tennessee state championship on two occasions. After 16 seasons, he became head boys' basketball coach at Nashville Christian where he also teaches Bible study.
