= Tim Harris (linebacker) =

American football player (born 1964)

No. 97, 99, 92
- Positions: Linebacker, defensive end

Personal information
- Born: September 10, 1964 (age 62); Birmingham, Alabama, U.S.
- Listed height: 6 ft 6 in (1.98 m)
- Listed weight: 265 lb (120 kg)

Career information
- High school: Woodlawn (Birmingham); Memphis Catholic (Memphis, Tennessee)
- College: Memphis
- NFL draft: 1986: 4th round, 84th overall pick

Career history
- Green Bay Packers (1986–1990); San Francisco 49ers (1991–1992); Philadelphia Eagles (1993); San Francisco 49ers (1994–1995)

Awards and highlights
- Super Bowl champion (XXIX); First-team All-Pro (1989); Second-team All-Pro (1988); Pro Bowl (1989); First Team All-South Independent (1983, 1984); Green Bay Packers Hall of Fame

Career NFL statistics
- Tackles: 537
- Sacks: 81
- Fumble recoveries: 8
- Stats at Pro Football Reference

Timothy David Harris (born September 10, 1964) is an American former professional football player who was a linebacker and defensive end in the National Football League (NFL) for the Green Bay Packers (1986–1990), the San Francisco 49ers (1991–1992, 1994–1995), and the Philadelphia Eagles (1993). He played college football at the University of Memphis and was selected by the Packers in the fourth round of the 1986 NFL draft.

As he entered Birmingham's Woodlawn High School, he began to excel in both football and basketball, but he moved with his aunt and uncle, who were teachers, to Memphis after his junior season. "My grades were not so good (at Woodlawn High) and I was not hanging around with the right people," Harris said. "And my mom and I thought I'd get more exposure in Memphis." [1]

Harris attended Memphis Catholic High School, but he was ineligible for most of the football season because of the move. Catholic High made the playoffs and Harris was finally declared eligible.

In his one and only game for Catholic, Harris recorded 22 tackles and caught the attention of major college coaches, including those at UCLA, Notre Dame and Tennessee. But he chose to stay close to home and play for the University of Memphis Tigers, where he was part of the nation's top-ranked defense for two seasons in 1984 and 85.

In The NFL, Harris was a key defensive player for a Packers team that finished 10-6 during the 1989 season, their best record since 1972. The team was referred to as the "Cardiac Pack" because of several close game wins. Harris finished that season with a career best 19.5 sacks and was selected to the Pro Bowl. Later in his career, he recorded 17 sacks as part of the 1992 San Francisco team that reached the NFC Championship Game. Two seasons later, he would earn a Super Bowl ring as the 49ers won Super Bowl XXIX.

Harris was a talkative, outgoing player, whose signature celebration after a sack was "six gun" hand gestures, whereby he pretended to shoot the opposing player. The NFL eventually banned his celebration as overly aggressive and unsportsmanlike.

During a Chicago Bears game in 1987 at Soldier Field, Harris and a young pair of Bears fans almost got into a fight over a flattened cup that was thrown directly at Harris. After the NFL and Pete Rozelle investigated the incident, it was determined that no disciplinary action would take place against Harris for the outburst.

In 2022, Harris was inducted into the Green Bay Packers Hall of Fame.
