= Memphis Catholic Middle and High School =

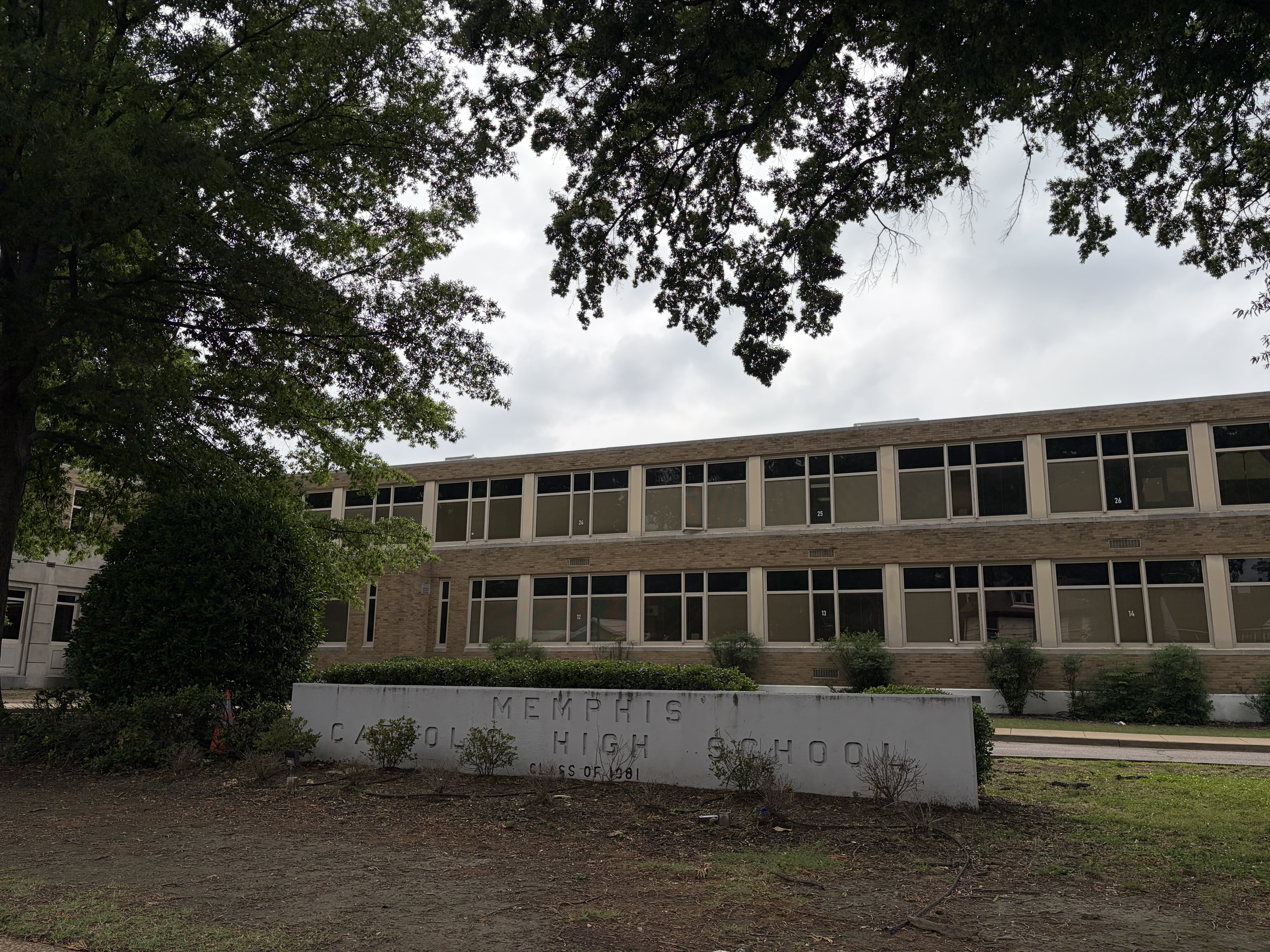
- The former school's building in 2026

Location
- 61 North McLean Boulevard; Memphis, (Shelby County), Tennessee 38104; United States; 35°8′22″N 90°0′0″W

Information
- Type: Private, College Preparatory
- Motto: Ex Umbris In Veritatem ("Out of Darkness into Truth")
- Religious affiliation: Roman Catholic
- Established: 1922
- Closed: 2019
- Oversight: Diocese of Memphis
- School code: 431385
- Grades: 7–12
- Gender: Coeducational
- Age range: 12–18
- Classrooms: 28
- Colors: Blue and white
- Athletics: basketball, soccer girls, volleyball, softball
- Sports: Basketball, soccer, softball, baseball, cheer, track
- Mascot: Chargers
- Accreditation: Southern Association of Colleges and Schools
- Yearbook: The Charger

Memphis Catholic Middle and High School was a private, Catholic middle and high school in Memphis, Tennessee located in the Diocese of Memphis. It was in St. Peter Village in Midtown Memphis. Part of the Jubilee Schools network of inner city Catholic schools serving low income families, it was scheduled to close after spring 2019.

== History ==
Memphis Catholic was established in 1922, consolidating several smaller, parish-run high schools. The middle school program opened in 1993.

Circa 2013 the school enacted the "Education That Works" program which helped stop a decrease in the number of students. In 2013 Bishop Byrne High School closed and merged into Memphis Catholic. That year each school had an enrollment of fewer than 200 students.

Memphis Catholic High School was scheduled to close at the completion of the 2018-2019 school year, along with other Jubilee Schools. The diocese stated that this was due to the depletion of a trust intended to fund the schools. New Day Schools intends to convert Memphis Catholic High into a charter school.

== Athletics ==
Memphis Catholic competed in Division 2, Region A of the Tennessee Secondary School Athletic Association (TSSAA). The school did not compete in the 2017 football season.

== Notable alumni ==
- Mo Alexander, comedian
- Tim Harris (1982), former professional football player
