= Franklin Road Academy =

Private school in Nashville, Tennessee, US

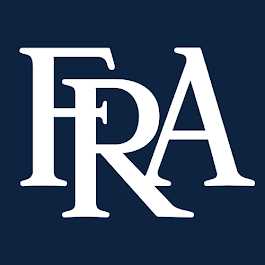

Location
- 4700 Franklin Pike; Nashville, Tennessee 37220; United States; 36°5′3″N 86°46′11″W

Information
- Type: Independent coeducational
- Established: 1971
- Head of school: Sean R. Casey
- Grades: PreK-12
- Enrollment: 1,130 (2025)
- Student to teacher ratio: 7:1
- Campus size: 62 acres (25 ha)
- Colors: Navy Blue and White
- Athletics conference: TSSAA - Division II-A
- Nickname: Panthers
- Accreditation: Southern Association of Colleges and Schools; Southern Association of Independent Schools; AdvancED
- Newspaper: The Panther Post
- Yearbook: The Blueprint
- Website: www.franklinroadacademy.com

Franklin Road Academy (FRA) is a private co-educational Christian school for students in pre-kindergarten through grade 12 located in Nashville, Tennessee. The school was founded in 1971 and originally affiliated with the First Christian Church before it became a separate incorporated organization in 1982. FRA has been described as a segregation academy, similar to other schools established following court-ordered desegregation busing in Nashville public schools. As of the 2021–22 school year, the school's student body had significantly less racial diversity than the surrounding district.

As of 2019, its head of school is Sean Casey and its head of upper school is Jay Salato. In 2016, FRA's enrollment was 795 students with ethnic and racial minority students comprising 18 percent of the student body. As of 2021, the school's enrollment had increased to 925 students. Its enrollment increased to 1,130 students in 2025. FRA is accredited by the Southern Association of Colleges and Schools, Southern Association of Independent Schools and AdvancED.

== History ==
=== Establishment and early years ===
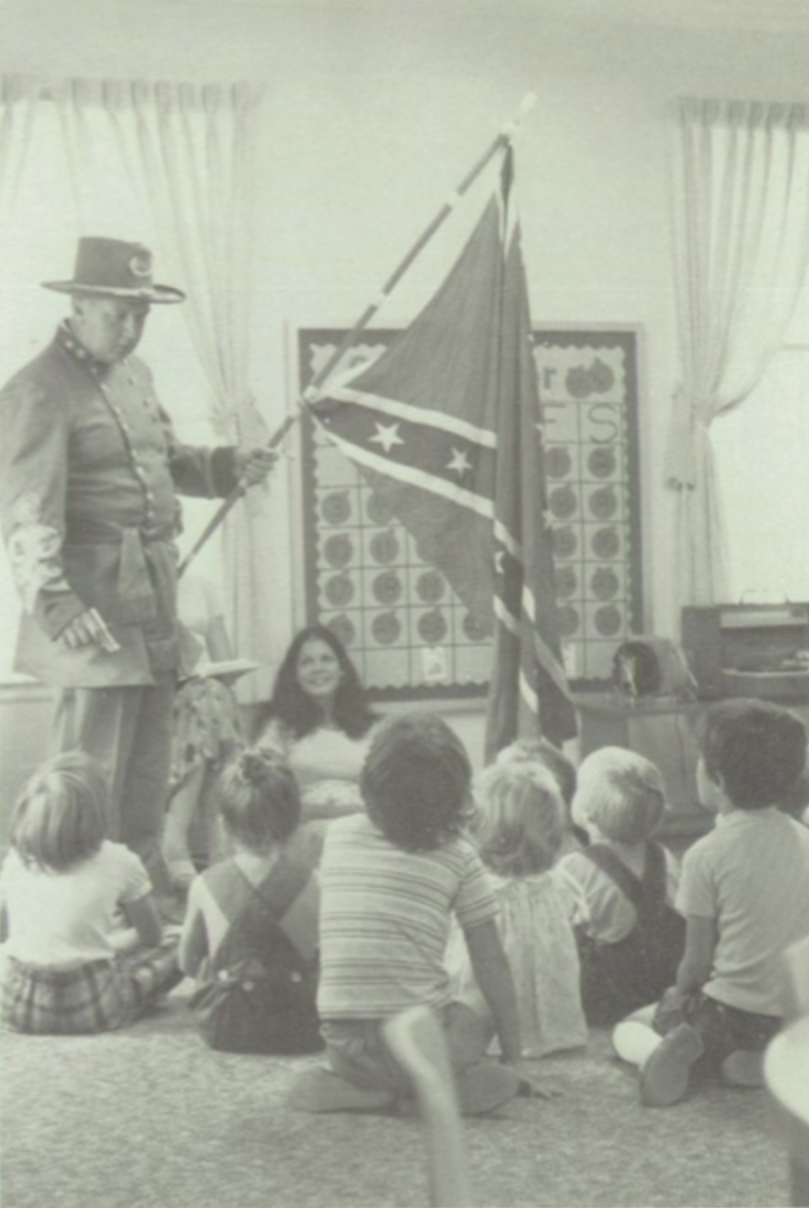
In the 1970s, FRA headmaster Bill Bradshaw was reported to wear a Confederate Army uniform to special events.

Franklin Road Academy was founded in 1971 as a segregation academy in response to the court-ordered racial integration of public schools. Although FRA's leaders said they established the school to provide a sound, Christian education in a safer environment, the sociologist Jennifer Dyer has argued that the stated objective was a guise for the actual objective: enabling parents to avoid enrolling their children in racially integrated public schools. The school named its sports teams the Rebels and decorated the football team's helmets with the Confederate flag; the school would fly actual Confederate flags for two decades.

The school opened with 15 teachers for kindergarten through fifth grade and 230 students who paid annual tuition of $700 ($4,100 today).

John Nova Lomax, the son of John Lomax III, attended FRA in its early years; in 2015, he recalled that the school immersed students with the folklore of the lost-cause myth.'

The school had no black students for at least its first seven years. In a 1980 interview, founder and headmaster Bill Bradshaw said that in the early 1970s, "escape from busing was probably definitely a factor" in the school's initial growth, but he denied that the school was established to avoid desegregation. Bradshaw, who was pictured in the 1979 yearbook in a Confederate Army uniform, acknowledged that the school's Confederate iconography meant that black people "may have thought" that they were unwelcome at the school, but he expressed hope that "in time, that will change." He argued that the private school's tuition costs were the main reason few black students enrolled. Bradshaw also noted that blacks "have been inclined to stay in their own groups", an allusion to the integration of a historically black elementary school in Nashville that was opposed by some African-Americans.

Inquiries from parents to FRA tripled in 1980 after court rulings expanded desegregation busing in Nashville. At the time, only one of Franklin Road's 745 students was black.

In March 1981, Bradshaw and the entire board of directors resigned in a dispute with First Christian Church, which owned the building used by the school. Football coach Gene Andrews was appointed interim headmaster.

On June 3, 1982, Franklin Road Academy became an independent organization styled Franklin Road Academy, Inc.

In 1983, an anonymous donor donated money to add a second floor to the high school for the creation of a middle school. Four years later, FRA raised $3 million through a capital campaign to build a separate lower school (elementary school). In 1988, the new lower school was dedicated as Danner Hall.

=== Removal of Confederate symbols ===
The school stopped flying the Confederate flag in 1991. Headmaster Bill Campbell said the flag was removed to ensure all students and visiting sports teams felt welcome and comfortable at the school. In a guest editorial in The Tennessean, former FRA football coach and interim headmaster Gene Andrews criticized the change, accusing FRA of "turning its back on its heritage" and ignoring the sacrifices made in support of the "just cause" of southern independence.

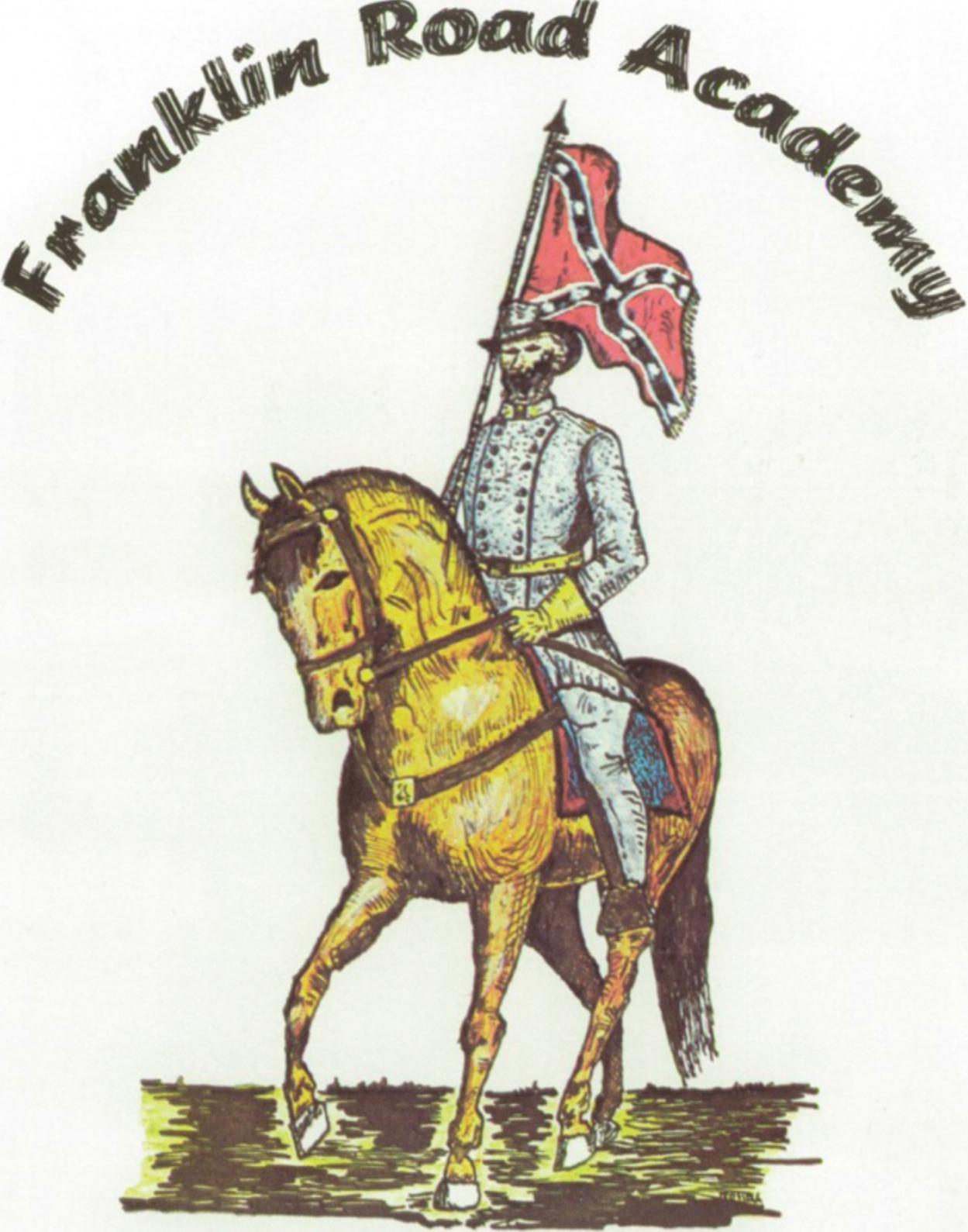
In 1997, FRA stopped using the Rebels as its athletics mascot.

In 1997, FRA stopped using Rebels as its team name and became the Big Blue. The school had begun to tone down use of the mascot in the early 1990s to make the school more welcoming to minorities. Assistant principal Gary Clarke said, "We felt, of course, there was a lot of tradition at the school with the Rebels, but we also have to realize that the Rebel flag may be offensive to some." School official stated that the final move was to attract a more diverse study body". The FRA football coach, George Weicker, told The Tennessean that the mascot had been retired in part because of the unease the Confederate imagery caused to Dennis Harrison, a former NFL player who was the first black assistant coach at the school. Weicker said that he asked Harrison how he felt about the mascot and what its symbolism meant to him. Weicker said that Harrison told him the mascot made him feel "uncomfortable".

In 2021, the author David Dark noted that he struggled to reckon with yearbook images that showed him at the FRA prom alongside the Confederate flag.

=== Expansion ===
In 1999, FRA completed a $7 million middle school and fine arts building. The three-story building holds classrooms for about 300 5th- through 8th-grade students, a theatre, two art rooms, a band room, a choir room, four practice rooms with pianos, and a dance studio.

In 2006 and 2007, the school expanded and improved its campus in a $12 million project. It acquired 12 acres (4.9 ha) of First Christian Church property, bringing the campus to 55 acres (22 ha). It built a math and science building of 26,300 square feet (2,440 m^{2}) and a library and technology center of14,500 square feet (1,350 m^{2}). The main school building was renovated to serve athletics and humanities. The new and renovated buildings form a central quadrangle. The school's original classrooms in the former church property were also renovated for foreign language classes. Moving the books into the new Library and Technology Center from the old library took four days and involved some 600 students.

In 2017, Franklin Road Academy opened an innovation-science lab with a robotics arena, two 3D printers, a laser cutter and a 3D carver. Nashville Mayor Megan Barry helped dedicate the space, which is also used by Metropolitcan Nashville Public Schools (MNPS). The FRA head of school said, "It's a great opportunity to build a collective educational opportunity for everyone." An FRA-MNPS summer program builds precollegiate STEAM (Science, technology, engineering, art and math) skills. In 2022, the school established the Center for Entrepreneurial Leadership to expand experiential learning with curriculum and programs to develop foundational skills.

== Academics ==
After its incorporation, Franklin Road Academy was unable to obtain state certification. The school did receive accreditation from the Southern Association of Colleges and Schools. As of 2025, it has been accredited by AdvancED since 1982 and by the Southern Association of Independent Schools since 1986.

FRA has pre-kindergarten through grade 12 classes split into Early Childhood (pre-kindergarten), Lower School (kindergarten-grade 4), Middle School (grades 5–8) and Upper School (grades 9–12) divisions. Courses at FRA include AP authorized by the College Board, Art, Music, Performance Arts and World Language. More than 70 percent of the faculty holds advanced degrees. The school says that all of its students are accepted at four-year colleges or universities.

The school's Heart to Heart program offers full inclusion and educational opportunities offers students with Down syndrome in kindergarten through grade 12. In 2016, the program was featured on ESPN when student Robert Lewis hit a 3-pointer in his senior night basketball game.

FRA is a member school of the Global Online Academy. It was the first school in Tennessee to become a member.

In September 2025, FRA announced that it was the first school in Tennessee to earn the Responsible AI in Learning (RAIL) endorsement from the Middle States Association.

== Campus ==
The 62-acre Franklin Road Academy campus is located at 4700 Franklin Pike in Oak Hill, Tennessee at the corner of Franklin Pike and Harding Pike. The FRA campus was the site of the Battle of Peach Orchard in the American civil war.

In 1994, the George A. Volkert Athletic Complex was completed. Referred to as "The Hill" by students and faculty, the complex houses a football stadium, baseball stadium, tennis courts, a track, and a softball field.

In 2019, Franklin Road Academy completed the Weicker Center for students and families to "have a space that helps build fellowship and supports the school's commitment to provide one of the finest independent school educational experiences in the nation." The student center is located in the middle of campus and includes a dining hall, classrooms, athletic spaces, admission offices, and campus security office.

In 2021, Franklin Road Academy opened a 4,000-square-foot fitness center that includes women's and men's locker rooms, a digital Alumni Hall of Fame, athletic offices and a training room. This addition was part of a previous expansion of the wrestling room, team film room, dance studio, and high school gym renovations.

== Athletics ==
Franklin Road Academy is a member of the Tennessee Secondary School Athletic Association (TSSAA) and competes in Division II-A. Its athletic programs include cheerleading, cross country, dance, football, golf, soccer, tennis and volleyball during the fall, with basketball, bowling, cheerleading, dance, hockey, swimming and wrestling during the winter, and baseball, dance, lacrosse, softball, tennis and track in the spring.

In 1992, funding shortfalls forced the school to rely on parent volunteers as groundskeepers for its athletic fields.

The 2016 Franklin Road Academy baseball team won the DII-A state championship. The baseball team also won state championships in 1984, 1988, and 2000.

The boys' basketball team finished runner-up in the State Championship in 2011, 2014, and 2016–2017. The girls' basketball team won the State Championship in 2011 and 2013, with runner-up finishes in 2010, 2012, 2015, and 2018.

The boys' cross country team has won six State Championship titles in 1997, 2000–2003, and 2005. The girls' cross country team won three individual State Championships from 1996 to 1998.

The football team won the State Championship in 1991.

The boys golf team won an individual State Championship in 1993 and 2025, while the girls golf team won the team State Championship eight times in 2005, 2010, 2012, 2013, and 2017–2020.

The boys soccer team finished second place in 2012, and the girls soccer team has recorded four State Championships in 2002, 2004, 2005, and 2007.

The boys' track and field team has won seven State Championships in 1998, 2001–2003, and 2022–2024. The girls' track and field team has won one State Championship in 2024.

The boys' wrestling team won the 2005 State Championship.

== Notable alumni ==
- Brian Shulman, NFL punter
- William L. Campbell Jr., United States District Judge of the United States District Court for the Middle District of Tennessee
- Will Wade, Head coach of the Louisiana State University men's basketball team
- Mason Mingus, stock car racing driver
- John Pierce, College basketball player, later coached at FRA

== See also ==
- Education segregation in Nashville
