= Jackson County High School (Gainesboro, Tennessee) =

- U.S. National Register of Historic Places
- Location within Tennessee
- Location: 707 School Dr., Gainesboro, Tennessee
- Coordinates: 36°21′02″N 85°39′27″W
- Area: 1.2 acres (0.49 ha)
- Built: 1939
- Architectural style: Colonial Revival
- NRHP reference No.: 09000535
- Added to NRHP: July 8, 2009

The Jackson County High School in Gainesboro, Tennessee was built in 1939 and was listed on the National Register of Historic Places in 2009. It has also been known as Fox Middle School.

Architecture: Colonial Revival

It was built as a Federal Emergency Administration of Public Works (?) project. It is a two-story, brick Colonial Revival-style building, with a two-story pedimented portico. It has an I-shaped overall plan.

It was designed by architects Marr and Holman, of Nashville, Tennessee, and it was built by F.C. Gorrell and Sons, of Russellville, Kentucky.

In addition to the school building, there is a contributing structure on the property.

It served as the Jackson County High School from 1939 until 1969, and thereafter as the Fox Middle School until around 2000.

It is located at 707 School Dr. in Gainesboro.
