= Hardin County High School =

Public school in Savannah, Tennessee, US

Location
- 1170 Pickwick St, Savannah, TN 38372
- Coordinates: 35.21076°N 88.24622°W

Information
- Type: Public
- School district: Hardin County School District
- Principal: Wes Wilkerson
- Faculty: 69.50 (FTE)
- Grades: 9–12
- Student to teacher ratio: 14.19
- Colors: Maroon, white, and gray
- Mascot: Tiger

Hardin County High School is an American high school located in the city of Savannah, Tennessee.
