= Milan High School (Tennessee) =

High school in Tennessee, United States

Coordinates: 35.9262°N 88.7363°W

Location
- 7060 East Van Hook Drive; Milan, (Gibson County), Tennessee 38358; United States

Information
- Type: Public high school
- NCES District ID: 470297001189
- Principal: Jennifer Yates
- Staff: 29.83 (FTE)
- Enrollment: 523 (2023-2024)
- Student to teacher ratio: 17.30
- Colors: Purple; White
- Athletics conference: TSSAA
- Nickname: Bulldogs

Milan High school is a high school in Milan, Tennessee. There was 523 students enrolled as of the 2024 to 2025 school year. Students can enroll in dual-credit English and Mathematics courses to obtain a credit towards their college requirements.

== Extracurriculars ==
The school offers the following noteworthy clubs and activities. Some other honorable mentions are the school's French and Spanish language clubs.

- Art Club
- Band
- BETA Club
- Book Club
- Choir
- Drama
- FBLA
- FCA
- FFA
- HOSA
- SADD
- SkillsUSA
- Student Council
- Yearbook

== Athletics ==
Milan High offers baseball, basketball, cheerleading, cross country, football, golf, soccer, softball, tennis, track and field, volleyball. They compete in the TSSAA's West division and 8th athletic district.

The school has a successful record for football specifically, being consistent contenders for the state championship from 2008 to 2012, picking up again in 2020 and 2024.

Team State Titles
Year	Sport	Class	Award	Details
1942	Boys' Basketball		Runner-Up	
1960	Girls' Basketball		Champions	(36-0)
1971	Football	AA	Champions	
1977	Football	AA	Champions	
1981	Girls' Basketball	AA	Runner-Up	(28-5)
1981	Girls' Track and Field	AA	800 Meter Relay Champions	
1993	Football	2A	Runner-Up	
1998	Football	2A	Champions	
1999	Football	2A	Champions	
2001	Baseball	AA	Runner-Up	(29-11)
2004	Baseball	AA	Champions	(41-3)
2008	Girls' Basketball	AA	Runner-Up	(29-6)
2008	Football	2A	Runner-Up	(14-1)
2009	Football	3A	Runner-Up	(14-1)
2011	Football	3A	Runner-Up	(13-2)
2012	Football	3A	Runner-Up	(12-3)
2020	Football	3A	Runner-Up	(11-2)
2022	Boys' Basketball	2A	Runner-Up	(25-8)
2023	Baseball	2A	Runner-Up	(33-10)
2024	Football	2A	Runner-Up	(13-2)

Individual State Titles
Year	Sport	Class	Award	Details / Name
1981	Boys' Track and Field	AA	Shot Put Champion	Jeff Smith
1984	Girl's Track and Field	A-AA	Long Jump Champion	Mary Black
2014	Girls' Golf	A-AA	Runner-Up	Arianna Clemmer
2022	Boys' Track and Field	A	High Jump Champion	Andy Westbrook
2023	Boys' Track and Field	A	High Jump Champion	Andy Westbrook
2023	Boys' Track and Field	A	Discus Champion	Hank Fisher
2024	Girls' Track and Field	A	Long Jump Champion	Raven Milan
