= Northpoint Christian School =

Segregation academy in Mississippi

Location
- 7400 Getwell Road; Southaven, Mississippi 38672; United States; 34°58′3″N 89°55′59″W

Information
- Type: Private; Segregation academy (former)
- Motto: "Defend The Point"
- Established: 1973
- President: Jim Ferguson
- Grades: pre-K–12
- Enrollment: 1075 (2022-2023)
- Average class size: 20
- Student to teacher ratio: 12.5 to 1
- Colors: Navy, White, and Carolina Blue
- Mascot: Trojan
- Nickname: Trojans
- Affiliation: Baptist (1973-2013); Christian (no specific denomination) 2013-present
- Tuition: $4075-$8695
- Website: NCSTrojans.com

Northpoint Christian School (NCS) is a private Christian school located in Southaven, Mississippi, that has been described as a white flight school. The school was founded in 1973 by a group of ten White Southern Baptist churches in the Whitehaven section of Memphis, Tennessee, at a time when public schools were integrating Black and White students. Programs for kindergarten through Grade 8 began in 1973, and grades 9-12 were added the following year. As of 2014, the school was the third-largest private school in Greater Memphis.

== History ==
The Southern Baptist Educational Center was established by ten Southern Baptist churches in 1973 as a segregation academy seeking to avoid racially integrated public schools. When the school encountered financial problems in the summer of 1976, five of the churches dropped out, but the remaining churches raised cash and bought bonds to keep the school going. In 1977, white flight to the suburbs caused a decline in enrollment from 1,279 to 885. This resulted in another financial crisis and several churches, including Graceland, Hickory Hills, LaBelle Haven, LaBelle Place and Whitehaven Baptist Churches decided to end their support of the school. Broadway Baptist took over the schools debts and from then on solely operated the school. Broadway immediately began providing busing to the school.

In 1988, after what the school claimed was "The area was losing professionals as well as families who could afford to send their children to SBEC." The school moved from Memphis, to suburban Southaven, Mississippi as many white people of Memphis were moving to Southaven at that time during white flight.

At the start of the 2013-2014 school year, the schools name was changed from Southern Baptist Educational Center to Northpoint Christian School and began marketing itself as non-denominational rather than Southern Baptist.

On April 29, 2022, a Memphis local news source, WMC-TV, reported that a signs for "colored" and "whites" had been placed by water fountains; photos of those signs had been sent in to the TV station. The head of school, Jim Ferguson, said that it as "part of a lesson plan".

== Campuses ==
=== Churches ===
Because of the urgency to start a school immediately as integration took place, in 1972 grades K-8 were initially housed in Broadway Baptist Church in Whitehaven while the high school was housed at Graceland Baptist Church.

=== Holmes Road ===
The second 36 acres (15 ha) Memphis campus, located in Whitehaven at the intersection of Holmes Road and Tulane Road, was utilized from 1974 until 1988, when it was sold to the Memphis City School System to house the John P. Freeman School.

=== Southaven ===
A 61 acres (25 ha) property shared with Broadway Baptist in Southaven, Mississippi was purchased in 1986, and the school relocated there in September 1988 with 600 students.

== Athletics ==
Despite being located in Mississippi, NCS competes in Division II, Class A, of the Tennessee Secondary School Athletic Association (TSSAA) Division II. The athletic director is Ryan Richardson. Sports offered at NCS include baseball, boys and girls basketball, cheerleading, cross country, football, boys and girls golf, boys and girls soccer, softball, swimming, tennis, track, volleyball, and trap shooting.

The school has won TSSAA championships in:

- Baseball (2009, 2023)
- Girls basketball (2016, 2017)
- Football (2003)
- Boys golf (2011)
- Boys tennis (2008)
- Girls track and field (2001)
- Volleyball (2024)

== See also ==
- List of private schools in Mississippi
