= Davidson Academy (Tennessee) =

Location
- 1414 Old Hickory Blvd. Nashville, Tennessee 37207; 36.2811227°N 86.7802757°W

Information
- Type: Private, Coeducational
- Motto: Preparing Students for College, Life, and Eternity
- Religious affiliation: Christian
- Denomination: Interdenominational
- Founded: 1980
- Principal: Mrs. Sarah Jane Moore (Upper School), Mrs. Kelly Colley (Lower School)
- Headmaster: Dr. Lindsey Judd
- Faculty: 73
- Grades: 6 Wks–12
- Student to teacher ratio: 14:1
- Colors: Black, cardinal, white
- Mascot: Boomer the Bear
- Nickname: Bears
- Rival: Goodpasture Christian School
- Accreditation: Southern Association of Colleges and Schools
- Website: http://www.davidsonacademy.com

Davidson Academy is a private Christian school located in Nashville, Tennessee. It has students ranging from 6 weeks to 12th grade.

== History ==
Madison Christian School was founded as a ministry of the First Baptist Church of Madison in September 1980, enrolling students from grades one through four. In 1981 plans were announced by First Baptist and Grace Baptist – Nashville to build a new school building, rename the school Davidson Academy, and expand to grades K-12.

== Athletics ==
Davidson Academy fields sports teams for both girls and boys. Davidson competes in Division 2, section A of the private school division, in the Tennessee Secondary School Athletic Association.

== Notable alumni ==
- Rachel Smith, Miss USA, 2007 (4th Runner-up -Miss Universe, 2007)
- James Austin Johnson, Saturday Night Live (cast member, 2021–present)

== Social views ==
In 2015, Davidson Academy administrators cancelled a pre-K prospective student visit after learning that the child had two fathers. In the letter rejecting the child, Davidson Academy administrators stated that they "believe strongly in a strict interpretation of the Scriptures regarding the institution of marriage" and that they have "the right and responsibility to do everything possible to ensure that its expressed purposes, mission, and beliefs continue in their highest traditions and are not harmed, compromised, or hindered by unacceptable lifestyle conduct on the part of its students, parents or guardians."
