= Tennessee Secondary School Athletic Association =

Organization administering school sporting events

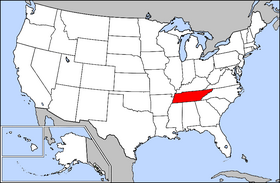
- Abbreviation: TSSAA
- Formation: 1925
- Type: Volunteer; NPO
- Legal status: Association
- Purpose: Athletic/Educational
- Headquarters: 3333 Lebanon Pike; Hermitage, TN 37076
- Region served: Tennessee
- Members: 374 schools
- Executive Director: Mark Reeves
- Affiliations: National Federation of State High School Associations
- Budget: $1,200,000+
- Website: tssaa.org

The Tennessee Secondary School Athletic Association (TSSAA), along with the affiliated Tennessee Middle School Athletic Association (TMSAA), is an organization which administers junior and senior high school sporting events in the U.S. state of Tennessee. The TSSAA (commonly pronounced "Tee double-S double-A") is the only high school athletic organization in the United States to have a five-sport, Olympic-style spring sport championship tournament, known as Spring Fling, for baseball, softball, track and field, team and individual tennis, and soccer. Spring Fling began in Chattanooga in 1993, later moving to Memphis, and then establishing itself in Murfreesboro. The TSSAA was one of the first high school athletic organizations to host a central site for football championships, beginning in 1982.

== Description ==
The Tennessee Secondary School Athletic Association administers sporting events for an estimated 110,000 participants, 374 schools, 4,000 coaches, 3,000 officials, and 5,500 teams in the state of Tennessee. First organized in 1925, the TSSAA oversees athletic functions of both public and private schools. It includes schools throughout the state of Tennessee.

In 2001, the association was a party in the United States Supreme Court case Brentwood Academy v. Tennessee Secondary School Athletic Association. Brentwood Academy had sued the Association after the school was penalized for "undue influence" in recruiting football players, and the case was appealed to the Supreme Court. The court in this case held that a statewide association, incorporated to regulate interscholastic athletic competition among public and private schools, is regarded as engaging in state action when it enforces a rule against a member school.

The fall of 2009 was the first year for the TSSAA to divide into six playoff classifications for football. The new system allowed more teams into the playoffs. The state championship game for football, the BlueCross Bowl, which is held three consecutive days, ending the first Saturday of December, and includes Division I classes 1A, 2A, 3A, 4A, 5A, and 6A, as well as Div. II A and AA, was held at Tennessee Tech University's Tucker Stadium in Cookeville 2009 – 2020 and has been held in Chattanooga since 2021.

== Classifications ==
Each school chooses to compete in Division I or Division II. Division I schools are schools which generally allow students to attend without payment of tuition, i.e., public schools, except that tuition may be charged to a student who is a resident of the county in which a school is located but outside of a city school district or special school district, in which case the tuition is the difference between the amount of additional funding per student provided by the city or special school district above that provided by the state and county. Division II schools are independent schools which charge tuition to students' families. Financial aid is allowed provided it is limited to a need-based amount, and that the percentage of athletes receiving aid is no greater than for the school's students as a whole. The two divisions compete separately in all sports except cheerleading and girls' wrestling.

Division I schools are divided into three classes, as equally as possible, based on enrollment. A school's enrollment is multiplied by 2 if it is single-sex (the only single-sex school in Division I is Chattanooga Girls' Leadership Academy).

Division II schools whose enrollment (with the single-sex multiplier taken into account) is below the smallest school in Division I Class AA are Class A; larger schools are Class AA.

Finally, any school that wishes to play in a higher class may do so, but must do so for all sports other than football.

A full reclassification is held every four years; at the midpoint, any school that has had a 20% increase or decrease in enrollment will be moved to the class appropriate to its new enrollment (a school that will be moved down may decline).

=== Football classifications ===
Starting with the 2015 season, a new classification system was implemented for Division I football, separate from those of other sports. The 31 largest schools in the state, plus Maryville playing up by request, will constitute Class 6A; the remaining football-playing schools are divided as equally as possible into classes 1A through 5A. The option to play up will apply separately to football and to the rest of the sports.

The 2015-2016 year varied from 2014-2015 only due to 20%-change adjustments.

=== Districts and Regions ===
For each sport, the schools competing are divided into regions, and/or districts depending on the sport.

==== Division I ====
- Basketball, Baseball, Softball, and Volleyball: Eight regions in each of the three classes, with two districts per region.
- Football (starting 2015): Four regions in Class 6A, eight regions each in 1A through 5A, with no districts.
- Soccer, Golf, and Tennis: Class AAA is as in basketball. Classes AA and A are combined, with districts/regions of the same number in the two classes competing together regardless of geography. (For example, soccer District 7 combines district 7-A in the Upper Cumberland Plateau with district 7-AA in western Chattanooga.)
- Cross-Country: As soccer, but with no districts (the state series begins with region meets).
- Track and Field: Class AAA has four sections (pairs of basketball/etc. regions). Class A-AA has three sections, namely the three grand divisions.
- Wrestling: In Class AAA, eight regions with two districts, but not the same as for other sports. (Districts are used only for the dual-meet series.) In Class A-AA, eight regions for duals, and three larger regions for the traditional series (note that one dual region is split between two traditional regions).
- Bowling: A single class with eight regions containing from one to four districts each.

==== Division II ====
- Most sports: Three regions in each of the two classes, in line with the East, Middle, and West grand divisions.
- Football: Split into three classes (A, AA, and AAA). In Classes A and AA, there are the three standard regions. In AAA, there are only two regions (East and West) that divide the state into halves.
- Cross-Country: No Class AA regions (all 11 teams enter the state meet).
- Track and Field, Wrestling, Bowling: One class with the usual three regions.

==== Combined Divisions ====
- Girls' Wrestling: Two regions, East and West.
- Cheerleading/Dance: Classes are determined by number of competitors on the team and by the style of performance, as per cheerleading/dance tradition.

== Administration ==
The TSSAA divides Tennessee's 95 counties, and the state's constituent Grand Divisions, into nine "athletic districts":

- District 1: Carter, Claiborne, Cocke, Grainger, Greene, Hamblen, Hancock, Hawkins, Jefferson, Johnson, Sevier, Sullivan, Unicoi, and Washington counties
- District 2: Anderson, Blount, Campbell, Knox, Loudon, McMinn, Monroe, Morgan, Roane, Scott, and Union counties
- District 3: Bledsoe, Bradley, Grundy, Hamilton, Marion, Meigs, Polk, Rhea, and Sequatchie counties
- District 4: Bedford, Cannon, Clay, Coffee, Cumberland, DeKalb, Fentress, Franklin, Jackson, Lincoln, Marshall, Moore, Overton, Pickett, Putnam, Rutherford, Smith, Van Buren, Warren, White, and Wilson counties
- District 5: Davidson, Macon, Montgomery, Robertson, Stewart, Sumner, and Trousdale counties
- District 6: Cheatham, Dickson, Hickman, Houston, Humphreys, Giles, Lawrence, Lewis, Maury, Perry, Wayne, and Williamson counties
- District 7: Benton, Carroll, Chester, Decatur, Fayette, Hardeman, Hardin, Henderson, Henry, Madison, and McNairy counties
- District 8: Crockett, Dyer, Gibson, Haywood, Lake, Lauderdale, Obion, Tipton, and Weakley counties
- District 9: Shelby County
  - East Tennessee comprises Districts 1, 2, and 3
  - Middle Tennessee comprises Districts 4, 5, and 6
  - West Tennessee comprises Districts 7, 8, and 9

These districts are unrelated to the competitive districts above (although a few sports do use the grand divisions as regions); their primary purpose is to elect the Board of Control (the administrative authority) and the Legislative Council. Each district elects one member to each for a staggered three-year term; in addition, starting in November 2015, three additional members will be chosen to represent non-public schools, one from each grand division.

== Out-of-state teams ==
The sole out-of-state school that is a member of the TSSAA is Northpoint Christian School in Southaven, Mississippi, a suburb of Memphis. Northpoint votes in the Athletic District 9 elections.

Cities and towns near Tennessee's borders with surrounding states, i.e. Arkansas, Georgia, Kentucky, Mississippi, or Virginia, such as Bristol, Chattanooga, Clarksville, and Memphis, do have various schools, both public and private, who play nearby out-of-state teams (which are not TSSAA members) on a regular basis, e.g. Heritage High School in Ringgold, Georgia for Chattanooga teams or Virginia High School in Bristol, Virginia for Bristol, Tennessee teams.

== See also ==
- List of Tennessee Secondary School Athletic Association championships
- List of Tennessee state high school football champions

== Notes ==
- ^1The only exception is Fort Campbell High School on the Tennessee side of the eponymous U.S. Army base. The base straddles the Kentucky-Tennessee border, most of the base housing is in Kentucky, and the school is administered by the same Department of Defense district as the high school at Fort Knox in Kentucky. Fort Campbell High is therefore a member of the Kentucky High School Athletic Association. Northpoint Christian School, located a short distance across the Mississippi state line, is a TSSAA member under a rule provision permitting TSSAA membership for a school that relocates from Tennessee to another state if the majority of students at the school are Tennessee residents.
