= 2022 Tennessee Volunteers football team =

American college football season

2022 Tennessee Volunteers football

Orange Bowl champion

Orange Bowl, W 31–14 vs. Clemson
- Conference: Southeastern Conference
- East Division

Ranking
- Coaches: No. 6
- AP: No. 6
- Record: 11–2 (6–2 SEC)
- Head coach: Josh Heupel (2nd season)
- Offensive coordinator: Alex Golesh (2nd season)
- Offensive scheme: Veer and shoot
- Defensive coordinator: Tim Banks (2nd season)
- Base defense: Multiple 4–3
- Home stadium: Neyland Stadium

2022 Southeastern Conference football standings
	Conf.			Overall
Team	W		L	W		L
Eastern Division
No. 1 Georgia xy$#^	8	–	0	15	–	0
No. 6 Tennessee	6	–	2	11	–	2
No. 23 South Carolina	4	–	4	8	–	5
Kentucky	3	–	5	7	–	6
Florida	3	–	5	6	–	7
Missouri	3	–	5	6	–	7
Vanderbilt	2	–	6	5	–	7
Western Division
No. 16 LSU xy	6	–	2	10	–	4
No. 5 Alabama x	6	–	2	11	–	2
No. 20 Mississippi State	4	–	4	9	–	4
Ole Miss	4	–	4	8	–	5
Arkansas	3	–	5	7	–	6
Auburn	2	–	6	5	–	7
Texas A&M	2	–	6	5	–	7
Championship: Georgia 50, LSU 30
# – College Football Playoff champion; ^ – College Football Playoff participant; $ – Conference champion; x – Division champion/co-champions; y – Championship game participant; Rankings from AP Poll

The 2022 Tennessee Volunteers football team represented the University of Tennessee in the 2022 NCAA Division I FBS football season. The Volunteers played their home games at Neyland Stadium in Knoxville, Tennessee, and competed in the Eastern Division of the Southeastern Conference (SEC). They were led by second-year head coach Josh Heupel.

On October 15, 2022, Tennessee beat the No. 3-ranked Alabama Crimson Tide, winning the rivalry game for the first time since 2006. Fans rushed the field at Neyland Stadium and tore down the goalposts, carrying them around campus and eventually throwing them into the Tennessee River. The university was fined $100,000 by the Southeastern Conference as a result of rushing the field. The university received $152,000 in donations from the fans to replace the goalposts. The Volunteers capped off an impressive 11 win season against the Clemson Tigers, winning the 2022 Orange Bowl 31–14, the Vols’ first 11 win season since 2001.

== Schedule ==
Tennessee and the SEC announced the 2022 football schedule on September 21, 2021.

Date	Time	Opponent	Rank	Site	TV	Result	Attendance
September 1	7:00 p.m.	Ball State*		Neyland Stadium; Knoxville, TN	SECN	W 59–10	92,236
September 10	3:30 p.m.	at No. 18 Pittsburgh*	No. 24	Acrisure Stadium; Pittsburgh, PA	ABC	W 34–27 ^{OT}	59,785
September 17	7:00 p.m.	Akron*	No. 15	Neyland Stadium; Knoxville, TN	SECN+/ESPN+	W 63–6	101,915
September 24	3:30 p.m.	No. 20 Florida	No. 11	Neyland Stadium; Knoxville, TN (rivalry / College GameDay / Checker Neyland)	CBS	W 38–33	101,915
October 8	12:00 p.m.	at No. 25 LSU	No. 8	Tiger Stadium; Baton Rouge, LA	ESPN	W 40–13	102,321
October 15	3:30 p.m.	No. 3 Alabama	No. 6	Neyland Stadium; Knoxville, TN (rivalry / College GameDay / SEC Nation)	CBS	W 52–49	101,915
October 22	12:00 p.m.	No. 18 (FCS) UT Martin*^{†}	No. 3	Neyland Stadium; Knoxville, TN	SECN	W 65–24	101,915
October 29	7:00 p.m.	No. 19 Kentucky	No. 3	Neyland Stadium; Knoxville, TN (rivalry)	ESPN	W 44–6	101,915
November 5	3:30 p.m.	at No. 3 Georgia	No. 1	Sanford Stadium; Athens, GA (rivalry / College GameDay / SEC Nation)	CBS	L 13–27	92,746
November 12	12:00 p.m.	Missouri	No. 5	Neyland Stadium; Knoxville, TN	CBS	W 66–24	101,915
November 19	7:00 p.m.	at South Carolina	No. 5	Williams–Brice Stadium; Columbia, SC (rivalry / SEC Nation)	ESPN	L 38–63	79,041
November 26	7:30 p.m.	at Vanderbilt	No. 10	FirstBank Stadium; Nashville, TN (rivalry)	SECN	W 56–0	40,350
December 30	8:00 p.m.	vs. No. 7 Clemson*	No. 6	Hard Rock Stadium; Miami Gardens, FL (Orange Bowl)	ESPN	W 31–14	63,912
*Non-conference game; ^{†}Homecoming; Rankings from AP Poll (and CFP Rankings, after November 1) – Released prior to game; All times are in Eastern time

== Game summaries ==
=== vs Ball State ===
Game One: Ball State Cardinals (0–0) at Tennessee Volunteers (0–0) – Game summary

Quarter	1	2	3	4	Total
Ball State	0	0	7	3	10
Tennessee	17	21	14	7	59

at Neyland Stadium, Knoxville, TN

- Date: September 1
- Game time: 7:00 p.m.
- Game weather: Sunny, 87 °F (31 °C)
- Game attendance: 92,236
- Referee: Steve Marlowe
- TV announcers (SECN): Tom Hart (play-by-play), Jordan Rodgers (color) and Cole Cubelic (sidelines)

Statistics	Ball State	Tennessee
First downs	17	32
Total yards	343	569
Rushing yards	74	218
Passing yards	269	351
Turnovers	3	1
Time of possession	30:05	29:55

Team	Category	Player	Statistics
Ball State	Passing	John Paddock	27/43, 269 yards, 1 TD, 2 INT
Ball State	Rushing	Carson Steele	11 carries, 27 yards
Ball State	Receiving	Jayshon Jackson	5 receptions, 65 yards
Tennessee	Passing	Hendon Hooker	18/25, 221 yards, 2 TD
Tennessee	Rushing	Jaylen Wright	13 carries, 88 yards, 1 TD
Tennessee	Receiving	Cedric Tillman	6 receptions, 68 yards

=== At No. 17 Pittsburgh ===
Game Two: No. 24 Tennessee Volunteers (1–0) vs No. 17 Pittsburgh Panthers (1–0) – Game summary

Quarter	1	2	3	4	OT	Total
No. 24 Volunteers	7	17	0	3	7	34
No. 17 Panthers	10	7	0	10	0	27

at Acrisure Stadium • Pittsburgh, PA

- Date: September 10
- Game time: 3:30 p.m. EST/ 12:30 p.m. PST
- Game weather: 75 °F (24 °C)
- Game attendance: 59,785
- Referee: Jason Autrey
- TV announcers (ABC): Sean McDonough (play-by-play), Todd Blackledge (color), Molly McGrath (sidelines)

Game information

First Quarter

- (10:27) PITT – Ben Sauls 30 yard field goal (Drive: 9 plays, 43 yards, 3:58; PITT 3–0)
- (9:00) PITT – Israel Abanikanda 76 yard rush, Ben Sauls kick (Drive: 1 play, 76 yards, 0:13; PITT 10–0)
- (1:02) TEN – Jabari Small 1 yard rush, Chase McGrath kick (Drive: 11 plays, 80 yards, 3:14; PITT 10–7)

Second Quarter

- (13:25) PITT – Gavin Bartholomew 57 yard pass from Kedon Slovis, Ben Sauls kick (Drive: 6 plays, 83 yards, 2:32; PITT 17–7)
- (10:04) TEN – Bru McCoy 32 yard pass from Hendon Hooker, Chase McGrath kick (Drive: 10 plays, 71 yards, 3:13; PITT 17–14)
- (4:56) TEN – Jabari Small 1 yard rush, Chase McGrath kick (Drive: 3 plays, 66 yards, 0:35; TEN 21–17)
- (0:00) TEN – Chase McGrath 37 yard field goal (Drive: 3 plays, 8 yards, 0:10; TEN 24–17)

Fourth Quarter

- (14:07) PITT – Ben Sauls 35 yard field goal (Drive: 12 plays, 27 yards, 5:13; TEN 24–20)
- (8:57) TEN – Chase McGrath 51 yard field goal (Drive: 15 plays, 41 yards, 5:10; TEN 27–20)
- (2:23) PITT – Jared Wayne 4 yard pass from Nick Patti, Ben Sauls kick (Drive: 10 plays, 35 yards, 5:05; Tie 27–27)

Overtime

- (0:00) TEN – Cedric Tillman 28 yard pass from Hendon Hooker, Chase McGrath kick (Drive: 2 plays, 25 yards, 0:00; TEN 34–27)

Statistics	TEN	PITT
First downs	20	21
Total yards	416	415
Rushes/yards	33–91	39–141
Passing yards	325	274
Passing: Comp–Att–Int	27–42–0	23–44–1
Time of possession	25:05	34:55

Team	Category	Player	Statistics
Tennessee	Passing	Hendon Hooker	27–42, 325 yards, 2 TD
Tennessee	Rushing	Jaylen Wright	9 carries, 47 yards
Tennessee	Receiving	Cedric Tillman	9 receptions, 162 yards, 1 TD
Pittsburgh	Passing	Kedon Slovis	14–24, 195 yards, 1 TD, 1 INT
Pittsburgh	Rushing	Israel Abanikanda	25 carries, 154 yards, 1 TD
Pittsburgh	Receiving	Gavin Bartholomew	5 receptions, 84 yards, 1 TD

=== vs Akron ===
Game Three: Akron Zips (1–1) at No. 15 Tennessee Volunteers (2–0) – Game summary

Quarter	1	2	3	4	Total
Akron	0	0	3	3	6
No. 15 Tennessee	14	14	21	14	63

at Neyland Stadium, Knoxville, TN

- Date: September 17
- Game time: 7:00 p.m.
- Game weather: Clear, 80 °F (27 °C)
- Game attendance: 101,915
- Referee: Ken Williamson
- TV announcers (SECN+/ESPN+): Drew Carter (play-by-play), Aaron Murray (color) and Ashley Stroehlein (sidelines)

=== vs No. 20 Florida ===
Overall record	Previous meeting	Previous winner
31–20	September 25, 2021	Florida, 38–14

Game Four: No. 20 Florida Gators (2–1) at No. 11 Tennessee Volunteers (3–0) – Game summary

Quarter	1	2	3	4	Total
No. 20 Florida	0	14	7	12	33
No. 11 Tennessee	3	14	14	7	38

at Neyland Stadium • Knoxville, TN

- Date: September 24, 2022
- Game time: 3:30 p.m. EDT
- Game weather: Temperature: 72 °F (22 °C) • Wind: Calm • Weather: Cloudy
- Game attendance: 101,915
- Referee: Scott Walker
- TV announcers (CBS): Brad Nessler (play-by-play), Gary Danielson (color), Jenny Dell (sideline reporter)
- Boxscore

Game information

First quarter

- Tennessee – Chase McGrath 32-yard field goal, 1:11

Second quarter

- Florida – Keon Zipperer 44-yard pass from Anthony Richardson (Adam Mihalek kick), 12:41
- Tennessee – Hendon Hooker 4-yard run (Chase McGrath kick), 11:59
- Florida – Anthony Richardson 7-yard run (Adam Mihalek kick), 8:28
- Tennessee – Bru McCoy 1 yard pass from Hendon Hooker (Chase McGrath kick), 0:07

Third quarter

- Tennessee – Jabari Small 16-yard pass from Hendon Hooker (Chase McGrath kick), 12:08
- Florida – Anthony Richardson 1 yard run (Adam Mihalek kick), 5:55
- Tennessee – Jabari Small 1 yard run (Chase McGrath kick), 3:58

Fourth quarter

- Tennessee – Jaylen Wright 5-yard run (Chase McGrath kick), 7:55
- Florida – Montrell Johnson Jr. 5-yard run, 4:49
- Florida – Ricky Pearsall 3-yard pass from Anthony Richardson, 0:17

Passing leaders

- Florida – Anthony Richardson – 24/44, 453 yards, 2 touchdowns, 1 interception
- Tennessee – Hendon Hooker – 22/28, 349 yards, 2 touchdowns

Rushing leaders

- Florida – Anthony Richardson – 17 carries, 67 yards, 2 touchdowns
- Tennessee – Hendon Hooker – 13 carries, 112 yards, 1 touchdown

Receiving leaders

- Florida – Justin Shorter – 7 receptions, 155 yards
- Tennessee – Bru McCoy – 5 receptions, 102 yards, 1 touchdown

Tackling leaders

- Florida – Rashad Torrence II – 13 tackles
- Tennessee – Jeremy Banks & Kamal Hadden – 7 tackles

=== At No. 25 LSU Tigers ===
Game Five: No. 8 Tennessee Volunteers (4–0) at No. 25 LSU Tigers (4–1) – Game summary

Quarter	1	2	3	4	Total
No. 8 Volunteers	13	10	14	3	40
No. 25 Tigers	0	7	0	6	13

at Tiger Stadium, Baton Rouge, Louisiana

- Date: October 8
- Game time: 11:00 a.m. CDT
- Game weather: Sunny, 79 °F (26 °C)
- Game attendance: 102,321
- Referee: Steve Marlowe
- TV announcers (ESPN): Bob Wischusen, Dan Orlovsky, Todd McShay and Kris Budden
- Box score, Recap

Game information

First quarter

- TENN – Jabari Small 1-yard run (Chase McGrath kick), 13:46. Volunteers 7–0. Drive: 5 plays, 27 yards, 1:14.
- TENN – Chase McGrath 35-yard field goal, 11:08. Volunteers 10–0. Drive: 4 plays, 8 yards, 1:23.
- TENN – Chase McGrath 38-yard field goal, 2:26. Volunteers 13–0. Drive: 11 plays, 68 yards, 3:22.

Second quarter

- TENN – Jalin Hyatt 45-yard pass from Hendon Hooker (Chase McGrath kick), 14:39. Volunteers 20–0. Drive: 1 play, 45 yards, 0:07.
- LSU – Josh Williams 1-yard run (Damian Ramos kick), 3:05. Volunteers 20–7. Drive: 12 plays, 96 yards, 5:14.
- TENN – Chase McGrath 32-yard field goal, 0:00. Volunteers 23–7. Drive: 5 plays, 32 yards, 0:23.

Third quarter

- TENN – Jalin Hyatt 14-yard pass from Hendon Hooker (Chase McGrath kick), 11:47. Volunteers 30–7. Drive: 8 plays, 76 yards, 3:13.
- TENN – Jabari Small 5-yard run (Chase McGrath kick), 2:13. Volunteers 37–7. Drive: 8 plays, 92 yards, 3:19.

Fourth quarter

- LSU – Kayshon Boutte 5-yard pass from Jayden Daniels (run failed), 11:32. Volunteers 37–13. Drive: 13 plays, 75 yards, 5:41.
- TENN – Chase McGrath 32-yard field goal, 2:39. Volunteers 40–13. Drive: 13 plays, 81 yards, 8:53.

Top passers

- TENN – Hendon Hooker – 17/27, 239 yards, 2 TD
- LSU – Jayden Daniels – 32/45, 300 yards, TD, INT

Top rushers

- TENN – Jabari Small – 22 rushes, 127 yards, 2 TD
- LSU – Jayden Daniels – 16 rushes, 38 yards

Top receivers

- TENN – Bru McCoy – 7 receptions, 140 yards
- LSU – Malik Nabers – 6 receptions, 80 yards

=== vs No. 3 Alabama ===
Third Saturday in October

Team	1	2	3	4	Total
No. 3 Alabama	7	13	15	14	49
• No. 6 Tennessee	21	7	6	18	52

- Date: October 15
- Location: Knoxville, TN
- Game start: 3:39 p.m.
- Game attendance: 101,915
- Game weather: 78, Cloudy, Wind SW @ 12 mph
- Referee: Jason Autrey
- TV announcers (CBS): Brad Nessler (play-by-play), Gary Danielson (color), Jenny Dell (sideline)

Statistics	Alabama	Tennessee
First downs	32	29
Total yards	569	567
Rushing yards	114	182
Passing yards	455	385
Turnovers	1	2
Time of possession	37:29	22:31

Team	Category	Player	Statistics
Alabama	Passing	Bryce Young	35/52, 455 yards, 2 TD’s
Alabama	Rushing	Jahmyr Gibbs	24 carries, 103 yards, 3 TD’s
Alabama	Receiving	Cameron Latu	6 receptions, 90 yards, 1 TD
Tennessee	Passing	Hendon Hooker	21/30, 385 yards, 5 TD’s, 1 INT
Tennessee	Rushing	Jaylen Wright	12 carries, 71 yards
Tennessee	Receiving	Jalin Hyatt	6 receptions, 207 yards, 5 TD’s

Scoring summary

Quarter	Time	Drive			Team	Scoring information	Score	
Quarter	Time	Plays	Yards	TOP	Team	Scoring information	ALA	TEN
1st	10:18	7	56	1:58	TENN	Jabari Small (#2) 1-yard touchdown run, Chase McGrath (#40) kick good	0	7
1st	7:59	8	71	2:19	ALA	Jahmyr Gibbs (#1) 8-yard touchdown run, Will Reichard (#16) kick good	7	7
1st	6:43	5	75	1:16	TENN	Jalin Hyatt (#11) 36-yard touchdown reception from Hendon Hooker (#5), Chase McGrath (#40) kick good	7	14
1st	3:59	4	35	1:02	TENN	Jalin Hyatt (#11) 11-yard touchdown reception from Hendon Hooker (#5), Chase McGrath (#40) kick good	7	21
2nd	14:07	12	73	4:52	ALA	21-yard field goal by Will Reichard (#16)	10	21
2nd	11:41	3	40	1:01	TENN	Princeton Fant (#88) 2-yard touchdown run, Chase McGrath (#40) kick good	10	28
2nd	6:46	10	84	4:55	ALA	Ja’Corey Brooks (#7) 7-yard touchdown reception from Bryce Young (#9), Will Reichard (#16) kick good	17	28
2nd	0:36	7	39	2:08	ALA	43-yard field goal by Will Reichard (#16)	20	28
3rd	11:11	3	59	1:02	ALA	Jahmyr Gibbs (#1) 26-yard touchdown reception from Bryce Young (#9), 2-point pass good	28	28
3rd		3	75	0:55	TENN	Jalin Hyatt (#11) 60-yard touchdown reception from Hendon Hooker (#5), Chase McGrath (#40) kick no good	28	34
3rd	4:27	12	75	5:49	ALA	Jahmyr Gibbs (#1) 2-yard touchdown run, Will Reichard (#16) kick good	35	34
4th	14:01	3	94	0:50	TENN	Jalin Hyatt (#11) 78-yard touchdown reception from Hendon Hooker (#5), 2-point pass good	35	42
4th	8:38	10	75	5:23	ALA	Cameron Latu (#81) 1-yard touchdown reception from Bryce Young (#9), Will Reichard (#16) kick good	42	42
4th	7:49	3	6	0:49	ALA	Dallas Turner (#15) 11 yrd fumble return, Will Reichard (#16) kick good	49	42
4th	3:26	11	75	4:23	TENN	Jalin Hyatt (#11) 13-yard touchdown reception from Hendon Hooker (#5), Chase McGrath (#40) kick good	49	49
4th	0:00	3	45	0:15	TENN	40-yard field goal by Chase McGrath (#40)	49	52
"TOP" = time of possession. For other American football terms, see Glossary of American football.							ALA 49	TEN 52

=== vs No. 18 (FCS) UT Martin ===
UT Martin at Tennessee

Quarter	1	2	3	4	Total
No. 18 (FCS) UT Martin	7	0	7	10	24
No. 3 Tennessee	21	31	6	7	65

at Neyland Stadium, Knoxville, TN

- Date: October 22
- Game time: Noon
- Game weather: Cloudy, 60 °F (16 °C)
- Game attendance: 101,915
- Referee: Kyle Olson
- TV announcers (SECN): Taylor Zarzour (play-by-play), Matt Stinchcomb (color) and Alyssa Lang (sidelines)

=== vs No. 19 Kentucky ===
Team	1	2	3	4	Total
No. 19 Kentucky	6	0	0	0	6
• No. 3 Tennessee	7	20	10	7	44

- Date: October 29
- Location: Knoxville, TN
- Game start: 7:11 p.m.
- Game attendance: 101,915
- Game weather: 64°F, Cloudy, Wind NE @ 2 mph
- Referee: Ken Williamson
- TV announcers (ESPN): Chris Fowler (play-by-play), Kirk Herbstreit (color), Holly Rowe (sideline)

Statistics	Kentucky	Tennessee
First downs	14	19
Total yards	205	422
Rushing yards	107	177
Passing yards	98	245
Turnovers	3	0
Time of possession	35:11	24:49

Team	Category	Player	Statistics
Kentucky	Passing	Will Levis	16/27, 98 yards, 3 INT’s
Kentucky	Rushing	Chris Rodriguez Jr.	15 carries, 64 yards, 1 TD
Kentucky	Receiving	Jordan Dingle	4 receptions, 44 yards
Tennessee	Passing	Hendon Hooker	19/25, 245 yards, 3 TD’s
Tennessee	Rushing	Jabari Small	21 carries, 78 yards
Tennessee	Receiving	Jalin Hyatt	5 receptions, 138 yards, 2 TD’s

=== At No. 3 Georgia ===
No. 1 Tennessee at No. 3 Georgia

Quarter	1	2	3	4	Total
No. 1 Tennessee	3	3	0	7	13
No. 3 Georgia	14	10	3	0	27

at Sanford Stadium, Athens, GA

- Date: November 5
- Game time: 3:30 pm
- Game weather: Cloudy, 76 °F (24 °C)
- Game attendance: 92,746
- Referee: Jason Autrey
- TV announcers (CBS (College GameDay / SEC Nation)): Brad Nessler (play-by-play), Gary Danielson (color) and Jenny Dell (sidelines)

Game information

First quarter

- (10:05) TENN – Chase McGrath 47 Yd Field Goal (Tennessee 3–0)
- (8:32) UGA – Stetson Bennett 13 Yd Run (Jack Podlesny Kick) (Georgia 7-3)
- (3:32) UGA - Ladd McConkey 37 Yd pass from Stetson Bennett (Jack Podlesny Kick) (Georgia 14-3)

Second quarter

- (14:17) UGA – Marcus Rosemy-Jacksaint 5 Yd pass from Stetson Bennett (Jack Podlesny Kick) (Georgia 21–3)
- (5:35) TENN – Chase McGrath 36 Yd Field Goal (Georgia 21–6)
- (0:17) UGA – Jack Podlesny 19 Yd Field Goal (Georgia 24-6)

Third quarter

- (9:34) UGA – Jack Podlesny 38 Yd Field Goal (Georgia 27-6)

Fourth quarter

- (11:44) TENN – Jaylen Wright 5 Yd Run (Chase McGrath Kick) (Georgia 27-13)

Statistics	TENN	UGA
First downs	21	18
Plays–yards	75-289	62–387
Rushes–yards	94	130
Passing yards	195	257
Passing: comp–att–int	23–33–1	17–25–0
Turnovers		
Time of possession	29:00	31:00

Team	Category	Player	Statistics
Tennessee	Passing	Hendon Hooker	23/33, 195 yards, INT
Tennessee	Rushing	Jaylen Wright	21 carries, 69 yards, TD
Tennessee	Receiving	Cedric Tillman	7 receptions, 68 yards
Georgia	Passing	Stetson Bennett	17/25, 257 yards, 2 TD
Georgia	Rushing	Kenny McIntosh	10 carries, 52 yards
Georgia	Receiving	Ladd McConkey	5 receptions, 94 yards, 1 TD

=== vs Missouri ===
Missouri at No. 5 Tennessee

Quarter	1	2	3	4	Total
Missouri	7	10	7	0	24
No. 5 Tennessee	7	21	21	17	66

at Neyland Stadium, Knoxville, TN

- Date: November 12
- Game time: Noon
- Game weather: Cloudy, 50 °F (10 °C)
- Game attendance: 101,915
- Referee: Kyle Olson
- TV announcers (CBS): Tom McCarthy (play-by-play), Rick Neuheisel (color), Sherree Burress (sideline)

=== At South Carolina ===
No. 5 Tennessee at South Carolina

Quarter	1	2	3	4	Total
No. 5 Tennessee	7	17	7	7	38
South Carolina	21	14	7	21	63

at Williams-Brice Stadium, Columbia, South Carolina

- Date: November 19
- Game time: 7:00 pm
- Game weather: Clear, 53 °F (12 °C)
- Game attendance: 79,041
- Referee: David Smith
- TV announcers (ESPN): Chris Fowler (play-by-play), Kirk Herbstreit (color) and Holly Rowe (sidelines)

=== At Vanderbilt ===
No. 10 Tennessee at Vanderbilt

Quarter	1	2	3	4	Total
No. 10 Tennessee	14	7	21	14	56
Vanderbilt	0	0	0	0	0

at FirstBank Stadium, Nashville, Tennessee

- Date: November 26
- Game time: 7:30 pm
- Game weather: Rain, 56 °F (13 °C)
- Game attendance: 40,350
- Referee: Scott Walker
- TV announcers (SECN): Tom Hart (play-by-play), Jordan Rodgers (color) and Cole Cubelic (sidelines)

Statistics	TENN	VAN
First downs	16	17
Total yards	513	254
Rushing yards	362	147
Passing yards	151	107
Turnovers	1	0
Time of possession	16:15	43:45

Team	Category	Player	Statistics
Tennessee	Passing	Joe Milton	11/21, 147 yards, TD
Tennessee	Rushing	Jaylen Wright	5 rushes, 160 yards, 2 TD
Tennessee	Receiving	Jalin Hyatt	3 receptions, 86 yards
Vanderbilt	Passing	AJ Swann	11/17, 79 yards
Vanderbilt	Rushing	Ray Davis	21 rushes, 60 yards
Vanderbilt	Receiving	Will Sheppard	6 receptions, 48 yards

=== No. 7 Clemson ===
2022 Capital One Orange Bowl

Quarter	1	2	3	4	Total
No. 6 Tennessee	7	7	7	10	31
No. 7 Clemson	0	3	3	8	14

at Hard Rock Stadium, Miami Gardens, Florida

- Date: December 30, 2022
- Game time: 8:00 p.m. EST
- Game weather: Clear, 74 °F (23 °C)
- Game attendance: 63,912
- Referee: Ron Snodgrass
- TV announcers (ESPN): Joe Tessitore (play-by-play), Greg McElroy (analyst), and Katie George (sideline)
- Box score

Game information

First quarter

- TENN – Joe Milton 16 yard pass to Bru McCoy, (Chase McGrath PAT), 5:17. Volunteers 7–0. Drive: 12 plays, 75 yards, 4:01.

Second quarter

- TENN – Jabari Small 2 yard run, (McGrath PAT), 9:03. Volunteers 14–0. Drive: 5 plays, 75 yards, 1:12.
- CLEM – B. T. Potter 31 yard field goal. Volunteers 14–3. Drive: 10 plays, 46 yards, 3:52.

Third quarter

- CLEM – Potter 40 yard field goal. Volunteers 14–6. Drive: 10 plays, 45 yards, 4:03.
- TENN – Milton 14 yard pass to Squirrel White, (McGrath PAT), 0:05. Volunteers 21–6. Drive: 4 plays, 70 yards, 1:22.

Fourth quarter

- CLEM – Cade Klubnik 4 yard run, (2 point conversion good), 10:01. Volunteers 21–14. Drive: 12 plays, 71 yards, 5:04.
- TENN – Milton 46 yard pass to Ramel Keyton, (McGrath PAT), 8:34. Volunteers 28–14. Drive:6 plays, 75 yards, 1:27.
- TENN – McGrath 32 yard field goal, 3:07. Volunteers 31–14. Drive: 6 plays, 23 yards, 2:41.

Top passers

- CLEM – Cade Klubnik: 30–54, 320 yards, 2 INTs
- TENN – Joe Milton: 19–28, 251 yards, 3 TDs

Top rushers

- CLEM – Will Shipley: 17 rushes, 73 yards
- TENN – Jaylen Wright: 11 rushes, 89 yards

Top Receiving

- CLEM – Joseph Ngata: 8 receptions, 84 yards
- TENN – Squirrel White: 9 receptions, 108 yards, 1 TD

== Roster ==
2022 Tennessee Volunteers football team roster
Players
Coaches
Offense

Pos.	#	Name	Class
WR	0	Grant Frerking	Sr
RB	2	Jabari Small	Jr
QB	3	Tayven Jackson	Fr
WR	4	Cedric Tillman	Sr
QB	5	Hendon Hooker	Sr
WR	6	Jimmy Holiday	Jr
QB	7	Joe Milton	Sr
WR	10	Squirrel White	Fr
WR	11	Jalin Hyatt	Jr
QB	13	Gaston Moore	So
WR	15	Bru McCoy	Jr
WR	17	Michael Bittner	Jr
WR	19	Walker Merrill	So
RB	20	Jaylen Wright	So
QB	21	Navy Shuler	So
WR	22	Jack Jancek	So
RB	24	Dylan Sampson	Fr
WR	28	Nigel Lanier	Fr
RB	35	Patrick Wilk	Fr
RB	42	Hunter Barnes	Fr
TE	43	Titus Rohrer	Fr
TE	44	Charlie Browder	Fr
OL	50	Jackson Lampley	Jr
OL	53	Jeremiah Crawford	Sr
OL	54	Gerald Mincey	So
OL	55	Braeden Krivosh	So
OL	56	Mo Clipper Jr.	Fr
OL	58	Darnell Wright	Sr
OL	63	Cooper Mays	Jr
OL	64	William Parker	Fr
OL	65	Parker Ball	Jr
OL	66	Dayne Davis	Jr
OL	67	Connor Meadows	Fr
OL	68	Masai Reddick	Fr
OL	69	Gus Hill	Fr
OL	70	R. J. Perry	So
OL	72	Addison Nichols	Fr
OL	73	Brian Grant	Fr
OL	75	Jerome Carvin	Sr
OL	76	Javontez Spraggins	Jr
OL	78	Ollie Lane	Sr
WR	80	Ramel Keyton	Sr
WR	81	Chas Nimrod	Fr
WR	83	Trey Weary	Fr
WR	84	Kaleb Webb	Fr
TE	87	Jacob Warren	Sr
TE	88	Princeton Fant	Sr
TE	89	Hunter Salmon	Jr

Defense

Pos.	#	Name	Class
DB	0	Doneiko Slaughter	Jr
DB	1	Trevon Flowers	Sr
DB	2	Jaylen McCollough	Sr
DB	3	Dee Williams	Jr
DB	4	Warren Burrell	Sr
DB	5	Kamal Hadden	Jr
DL	6	Byron Young	Sr
DB	7	Romello Edwards	Sr
DB	8	Brandon Turnage	Jr
DL	9	Tyler Baron	Jr
LB	10	Juwan Mitchell	Sr
DL	11	LaTrell Bumphus	Sr
DB	12	Tamarion McDonald	Jr
DB	13	Wesley Walker	Jr
DB	14	Christian Charles	So
LB	15	Kwauze Garland	Jr
DB	17	Andre Turrentine	Fr
DL	19	Joshua Josephs	Fr
DL	20	Bryson Eason	So
DL	21	Omari Thomas	Jr
DB	22	Cameron Miller	Fr
DB	23	Cheyenne Labruzza	Sr
LB	24	Aaron Beasley	Sr
DB	25	Jourdan Thomas	Fr
DB	26	Lucien Brunetti	Fr
DL	27	James Pearce Jr.	Fr
DB	28	De'Shawn Rucker	So
DB	29	Christian Harrison	Fr
DL	30	Roman Harrison	Sr
LB	31	Nick Humphrey	Sr
LB	33	Jeremy Banks	Sr
DB	34	Trel Riley	So
DB	35	Will Brooks	So
DB	36	William Wright	So
LB	38	Solon Page III	Sr
LB	39	West Shuler	Jr
LB	40	Kalib Perry	Fr
DB	41	Malik Ganaway	Fr
DL	42	Tyre West	Fr
DB	43	Jerrod Gentry	Fr
LB	44	Elijah Herring	Fr
LB	47	Matt Gaca	Jr
DB	48	Derek Taylor	Fr
DL	51	Elijah Simmons	Jr
DL	52	Maurese Smith	Sr
LB	53	Jackson Hannah	Jr
LB	55	Will Albright	So
LB	56	Mekhi Bigelow	Fr
LB	57	Ben Bolton	Fr
DL	58	Isaac Green	Jr
DB	80	Montrell Bandy	Fr
DB	85	Carson Whitehead	Fr
DL	87	Joshua Helsdon	Fr
DL	88	Amari McNeill	Fr
DL	90	Dominic Bailey	So
DL	95	Da'Jon Terry	Jr
DL	96	Austin Lewis	Sr
DL	97	Jayson Jenkins	Fr
DL	99	Kurott Garland	Sr

Special teams

Pos.	#	Name	Class
K/P	37	Paxton Brooks	Sr
K	39	Toby Wilson	Sr
K	40	Chase McGrath	Sr
K	41	J. T. Carver	Fr
LS	47	Matthew Salansky	Jr
LS	48	Bennett Brady	Fr
LS	60	Alton Stephens	Jr
P	93	Kolby Morgan	Fr
K/P	94	Josh Turbyville	Fr
P	98	Jackson Ross	Fr

Head coach

- Josh Heupel

Coordinators/assistant coaches

- Alex Golesh – Offensive coordinator/Tight ends
- Tim Banks – Defensive coordinator
- Mike Ekeler – Special teams coordinator/Outside linebackers
- Joey Halzle – Quarterbacks
- Brian Jean-Mary – Linebackers
- Jerry Mack – Running backs
- Rodney Garner – Defensive line
- Glen Elarbee – Offensive line
- Willie Martinez – Secondary
- Kelsey Pope – Wide receivers
- Jeronimo Boche – Director, Sports Medicine
- Alec Abeln – Offensive Analyst
- Mitch Militello – Offensive Analyst
- Jack Taylor – Offensive Analyst
- Max Thurmond – Senior Offensive Analyst
- Chad Creamer – Defensive Analyst
- Levorn Harbin – Senior Defensive Analyst
- Kyle Blocker – Special Teams Analyst
- Rob Caprice – Graduate Assistant
- Kody Cook – Graduate Assistant
- Evan Crabtree – Graduate Assistant
- Tyler Hudanick – Graduate Assistant
- Tyson Kee – Graduate Assistant
- Forrest Lehman – Graduate Assistant
- Jared Peery – Graduate Assistant
- Earnest Thomas III – Graduate Assistant
- Aston Walker – Graduate Assistant

Legend

- (C) Team captain
- (S) Suspended
- (I) Ineligible
- Injured
- Redshirt

Roster
Last update: 7/13/23

== Rankings ==
Ranking movements Legend: ██ Increase in ranking ██ Decrease in ranking RV = Received votes т = Tied with team above or below ( ) = First-place votes
	Week															
Poll	Pre	1	2	3	4	5	6	7	8	9	10	11	12	13	14	Final
AP	RV	24	15	11	8	8	6	3 (15)	3 (13)	2т (18)	5	5	9	7	6	6
Coaches	RV	RV	16	12	9	8	8	4 (2)	3 (2)	3 (5)	5	5	11	8	6	6
CFP	Not released									1	5	5	10	7	6	Not released

== Players drafted into the NFL ==
Tennessee had five players selected in the 2023 NFL draft.

Round	Pick	Player	Position	NFL club
1	10	Darnell Wright	OT	Chicago Bears
3	68	Hendon Hooker	QB	Detroit Lions
3	73	Jalin Hyatt	WR	New York Giants
3	74	Cedric Tillman	WR	Cleveland Browns
3	77	Byron Young	DE	Los Angeles Rams
