= 2023 Tennessee Volunteers football team =

American college football season

2023 Tennessee Volunteers football

Citrus Bowl champion

Citrus Bowl, W 35–0 vs. Iowa
- Conference: Southeastern Conference
- Eastern Division

Ranking
- Coaches: No. 17
- AP: No. 17
- Record: 9–4 (4–4 SEC)
- Head coach: Josh Heupel (3rd season)
- Offensive coordinator: Joey Halzle (1st season)
- Offensive scheme: Veer and shoot
- Defensive coordinator: Tim Banks (3rd season)
- Base defense: Multiple 4–3
- Home stadium: Neyland Stadium

2023 Southeastern Conference football standings
	Conf.			Overall
Team	W		L	W		L
Eastern Division
No. 4 Georgia xy	8	–	0	13	–	1
No. 8 Missouri	6	–	2	11	–	2
No. 17 Tennessee	4	–	4	9	–	4
Kentucky	3	–	5	7	–	6
Florida	3	–	5	5	–	7
South Carolina	3	–	5	5	–	7
Vanderbilt	0	–	8	2	–	10
Western Division
No. 5 Alabama xy$^	8	–	0	12	–	2
No. 9 Ole Miss	6	–	2	11	–	2
No. 12 LSU	6	–	2	10	–	3
Texas A&M	4	–	4	7	–	6
Auburn	3	–	5	6	–	7
Mississippi State	1	–	7	5	–	7
Arkansas	1	–	7	4	–	8
Championship: Alabama 27, Georgia 24
^ – College Football Playoff participant; $ – Conference champion; x – Division champion/co-champions; y – Championship game participant; Rankings from AP Poll

The 2023 Tennessee Volunteers football team represented the University of Tennessee in the Eastern Division of the Southeastern Conference (SEC) during the 2023 NCAA Division I FBS football season. The Volunteers were led by Josh Heupel in his third year as head coach.

Tennessee was ranked 9th by 247Sports in the 2023 college football recruiting class.

The team played its home games at Neyland Stadium in Knoxville, Tennessee. This was the final year for the East division as the East and West divisions were eliminated after Texas and Oklahoma joined the SEC in 2024.

== Schedule ==
Date	Time	Opponent	Rank	Site	TV	Result	Attendance
September 2	12:00 p.m.	vs. Virginia*	No. 12	Nissan Stadium; Nashville, TN (SEC Nation)	ABC	W 49–13	69,507
September 9	5:00 p.m.	Austin Peay*	No. 9	Neyland Stadium; Knoxville, TN	SECN+/ESPN+	W 30–13	101,915
September 16	7:00 p.m.	at Florida	No. 11	Ben Hill Griffin Stadium; Gainesville, FL (rivalry)	ESPN	L 16–29	90,751
September 23	4:00 p.m.	UTSA*	No. 23	Neyland Stadium; Knoxville, TN	SECN	W 45–14	101,915
September 30	7:30 p.m.	South Carolina	No. 21	Neyland Stadium; Knoxville, TN (rivalry)	SECN	W 41–20	101,915
October 14	3:30 p.m.	Texas A&M	No. 19	Neyland Stadium; Knoxville, TN (SEC Nation)	CBS	W 20–13	101,915
October 21	3:30 p.m.	at No. 11 Alabama	No. 17	Bryant–Denny Stadium; Tuscaloosa, AL (Third Saturday in October / SEC Nation)	CBS	L 20–34	100,077
October 28	7:00 p.m.	at Kentucky	No. 21	Kroger Field; Lexington, KY (rivalry)	ESPN	W 33–27	61,665
November 4	12:00 p.m.	UConn*^{†}	No. 17	Neyland Stadium; Knoxville, TN	SECN	W 59–3	101,915
November 11	3:30 p.m.	at No. 14 Missouri	No. 13	Faurot Field; Columbia, MO	CBS	L 7–36	62,621
November 18	3:30 p.m.	No. 1 Georgia	No. 18	Neyland Stadium; Knoxville, TN (rivalry / SEC Nation)	CBS	L 10–38	101,915
November 25	3:30 p.m.	Vanderbilt	No. 21	Neyland Stadium; Knoxville, TN (rivalry)	SECN	W 48–24	101,915
January 1, 2024	1:00 p.m.	vs. No. 17 Iowa*	No. 21	Camping World Stadium; Orlando, FL (Citrus Bowl)	ABC	W 35–0	43,861
*Non-conference game; ^{†}Homecoming; Rankings from AP Poll (and CFP Rankings, after October 31) – Released prior to game; All times are in Eastern time

== Roster ==
2023 Tennessee Volunteers football team roster
Players
Coaches
Offense

Pos.	#	Name	Class
RB	0	Jaylen Wright	Jr
WR	1	Dont'e Thornton Jr.	Jr
RB	2	Jabari Small	Sr
WR	3	Dee Williams	Sr
RB	6	Dylan Sampson	So
QB	7	Joe Milton	Sr
QB	8	Nico Iamaleava	Fr
WR	9	Ramel Keyton	Sr
WR	10	Squirrel White	So
QB	13	Gaston Moore	Jr
WR	15	Bru McCoy	Sr
WR	17	Michael Bittner	Sr
QB	18	Ryan Damron	Fr
RB	20	Khalifa Keith	Fr
QB	21	Navy Shuler	Jr
WR	22	Jack Jancek	Jr
RB	23	Cameron Seldon	Fr
RB	25	DeSean Bishop	Fr
TE	27	Emmanuel Okoye	Fr
RB	28	Patrick Wilk	So
WR	29	Jack-Henry Jakobik	Fr
WR	31	Jackson Locke	So
TE	34	McCallan Castles	Sr
WR	35	Garrett Young	Fr
WR	36	Nathan Roberts	Fr
RB	42	Hunter Barnes	Fr
TE	43	Titus Rohrer	Fr
TE	44	Luke Shouse	Jr
TE	46	Cody Duncan	So
OL	51	Vysen Lang	Fr
OT	53	Jeremiah Crawford	Sr
OT	54	Gerald Mincey	Jr
OL	55	Braeden Krivosh	Jr
OL	56	Mo Clipper Jr.	Fr
OL	57	Connor Meadows	Fr
C	63	Cooper Mays	Sr
G	64	Ayden Bussell	Fr
C	65	Parker Ball	Sr
OL	66	Dayne Davis	Sr
G	68	Masai Reddick	Fr
OL	69	Gus Hill	Fr
G	70	Andrej Karic	Jr
OL	72	Addison Nichols	Fr
OT	73	Brian Grant	Fr
OT	74	John Campbell Jr.	Sr
G	75	Jackson Lampley	Sr
G	76	Javontez Spraggins	Sr
OT	77	Larry Johnson III	So
OL	78	Ollie Lane	Sr
OT	79	Shamurad Umarov	Fr
WR	80	Nate Spillman	Fr
WR	81	Chas Nimrod	Fr
WR	82	Dayton Sneed	Fr
WR	83	Trey Weary	Fr
WR	84	Kaleb Webb	Fr
WR	85	Nathan Leacock	Fr
TE	86	Ethan Davis	Fr
TE	87	Jacob Warren	Sr
TE	88	Charlie Browder	So
TE	89	Hunter Salmon	Sr

Defense

Pos.	#	Name	Class
CB	0	Doneiko Slaughter	Sr
CB	1	Gabe Jeudy-Lally	Sr
CB	2	Jaylen McCollough	Sr
CB	4	Warren Burrell	Sr
CB	5	Kamal Hadden	Sr
LB	6	Aaron Beasley	Sr
LB	7	Arion Carter	Fr
CB	8	Brandon Turnage	Sr
DL	9	Tyler Baron	Sr
DL	10	Elijah Simmons	Sr
LB	11	Keenan Pili	Sr
DB	12	Tamarion McDonald	Sr
DB	13	Wesley Walker	Sr
DB	14	Christian Charles	Jr
DB	15	Cristian Conyer	Fr
LB	15	Kwauze Garland	Sr
DB	17	Andre Turrentine	So
DB	18	Rickey Gibson III	Fr
DL	19	Joshua Josephs	So
DL	20	Bryson Eason	Jr
DL	21	Omari Thomas	Sr
LB	22	Jeremiah Telander	Fr
DB	24	Jordan Matthews	Fr
DB	25	Jourdan Thomas	So
DB	26	Carson Whitehead	Fr
DE	27	James Pearce Jr.	So
DB	28	De'Shawn Rucker	Jr
DB	29	Christian Harrison	So
DL	30	Roman Harrison	Sr
DL	31	Caleb Herring	Fr
DB	33	John Slaughter	Fr
DB	34	Jack Luttrell	Fr
DB	35	Will Brooks	Jr
DB	36	William Wright	Jr
DB	37	Montrell Bandy	So
DL	38	Chandavian Bradley	Fr
LB	39	Jalen Smith	Fr
LB	40	Kalib Perry	So
DL	41	Tyree Weathersby	Fr
DL	42	Tyre West	So
LB	44	Elijah Herring	So
DB	46	Malik Ganaway	Fr
DL	51	Tim Amet	So
DL	53	Daevin Hobbs	Fr
DL	55	Omarr Norman-Lott	Jr
LB	56	Mekhi Bigelow	Fr
LB	57	Ben Bolton	Fr
DL	58	Isaac Green	Sr
LB	59	Caleb Williams	Fr
DL	65	Camron Douglas	Fr
DL	87	Joshua Helsdon	Fr
DL	90	Dominic Bailey	Jr
DL	94	Nathan Robinson	Fr
DL	95	Trevor Duncan	Fr
DL	96	Austin Lewis	Sr
DL	97	Jayson Jenkins	Fr
DL	99	Kurott Garland	Sr

Special teams

Pos.	#	Name	Class
PK	19	Charles Campbell	Sr
PK	41	JT Carver	So
LS	47	Matthew Salansky	Sr
LS	48	Bennett Brady	Fr
LS	60	Alton Stephens	Sr
PK	90	Max Gilbert	Fr
P/PK	94	Josh Turbyville	Fr
P	98	Jackson Ross	Fr

Head coach

- Josh Heupel

Coordinators/assistant coaches

- Joey Halzle – Offensive coordinator/Quarterbacks
- Tim Banks – Defensive coordinator
- Mike Ekeler – Special teams coordinator/Outside linebackers
- Alec Abeln – Tight ends
- Glen Elarbee – Offensive line
- Rodney Garner – Defensive line
- Brian Jean-Mary – Linebackers
- Jerry Mack – Running backs
- Willie Martinez – Secondary
- Kelsey Pope – Wide receivers
- Max Thurmond – Senior offensive analyst

Legend

- (C) Team captain
- (S) Suspended
- (I) Ineligible
- Injured
- Redshirt

Roster

== Game summaries ==
=== vs Virginia ===
Game One – Virginia Cavaliers (0–0) vs No. 12 Tennessee Volunteers (0–0) – Game summary

Quarter	1	2	3	4	Total
Virginia	0	3	7	3	13
No. 12 Tennessee	7	14	14	14	49

at Nissan Stadium • Nashville, Tennessee

- Date: September 2, 2023
- Game time: 12:00 p.m. EST
- Game weather: Sunny, 80 °F (27 °C)
- Game attendance: 69,507
- Referee: Matt Loeffler
- TV announcers (ABC): Joe Tessitore (play-by-play), Jesse Palmer (analyst), Katie George (sideline)

Game information

First quarter

- (12:05) TENN – Dylan Sampson 9-yard pass from Joe Milton III (Charles Campbell kick) (Drive: 8 plays, 62 yards, 2:55; Tennessee 7–0)

Second quarter

- (4:41) TENN – Dylan Sampson 3-yard run (Charles Campbell kick) (Drive: 13 plays, 90 yards, 4:52; Tennessee 14–0)
- (1:42) UVA – Will Bettridge 30-yard field goal (Drive: 6 plays, 52 yards, 2:59; Tennessee 14–3)
- (0:06) TENN – Joe Milton III 1-yard run (Charles Campbell kick) (Drive: 9 plays, 75 yards, 1:36; Tennessee 21–3)

Third quarter

- (10:52) TENN – Joe Milton III 1-yard run (Charles Campbell kick) (Drive: 10 plays, 77 yards, 3:10; Tennessee 28–3)
- (7:23) TENN – Dylan Sampson 2-yard run (Charles Campbell kick) (Drive: 6 plays, 30 yards, 2:28; Tennessee 35–3)
- (3:05) UVA – Perris Jones 17-yard run (Will Bettridge kick) (Drive: 8 plays, 75 yards, 4:18; Tennessee 35–10)

Fourth quarter

- (13:36) TENN – Jacob Warren 11-yard pass from Joe Milton III (Charles Campbell kick) (Drive: 6 plays, 27 yards, 2:03; Tennessee 42–10)
- (11:06) TENN – Dylan Sampson 3-yard run (Charles Campbell kick) (Drive: 7 plays, 40 yards, 1:40; Tennessee 49–10)
- (0:39) UVA – Will Bettridge 40-yard field goal (Drive: 10 plays, 47 yards, 3:57; Tennessee 49–13)

Statistics	UVA	TENN
First downs	12	29
Total yards	64–201	85–499
Rushing yards	40–95	52–287
Passing yards	106	212
Passing: Comp–Att–Int	11–24–0	23–33–0
Time of possession	32:54	27:06

Team	Category	Player	Statistics
Virginia	Passing	Tony Muskett	9/17, 94 yards
Virginia	Rushing	Perris Jones	7 carries, 39 yards, TD
Virginia	Receiving	Malachi Fields	4 receptions, 63 yards
Tennessee	Passing	Joe Milton III	21/30, 201 yards, 2 TD
Tennessee	Rushing	Jaylen Wright	12 carries, 115 yards
Tennessee	Receiving	Ramel Keyton	3 receptions, 66 yards

=== vs Austin Peay ===
Game Two – Austin Peay Governors (FCS) (0–1) at No. 12 Tennessee Volunteers (1–0) – Game summary

Quarter	1	2	3	4	Total
Austin Peay (FCS)	3	3	0	7	13
No. 12 Tennessee	3	10	10	7	30

at Neyland Stadium • Knoxville, Tennessee

- Date: September 9, 2023
- Game time: 5:30 p.m. EST
- Game weather: Cloudy, 78 °F (26 °C)
- Game attendance: 101,915
- Referee: Steve Marlowe
- TV announcers (SECN+/ESPN+): Justin Kutcher (play-by-play), Dave Steckel (analyst)

Game information

First quarter

- (11:06) PEAY — Maddux Trujillo 45-yard field goal (Drive: 8 plays, 48 yards, 3:54; Austin Peay 3–0)
- (5:51) TENN – Charles Campbell 28-yard field goal (Drive: 4 plays, 2 yards, 1:01; Tied 3–3)

Second quarter

- (8:15) PEAY – Maddux Trujillo 34-yard field goal (Drive: 12 plays, 67 yards, 6:39; Austin Peay 6–3)
- (4:55) TENN – Charles Campbell 37-yard field goal (Drive: 8 plays, 65 yards, 3:11; Tied 6–6)
- (0:15) TENN – Joe Milton III 6-yard run (Charles Campbell kick) (Drive: 11 plays, 67 yards, 2:04; Tennessee 13–6)

Third quarter

- (13:30) TENN – Ramel Keyton 5-yard pass from Joe Milton III (Charles Campbell kick) (Drive: 5 plays, 66 yards, 1:21; Tennessee 20–6)
- (6:33) TENN – Charles Campbell 22-yard field goal (Drive: 8 plays, 44 yards, 2:30; Tennessee 23–6)

Fourth quarter

- (9:01) PEAY – Trey Goodman 52-yard pass from Mike DiLiello (Maddux Trujillo kick) (Drive: 6 plays, 90 yards, 2:30; Tennessee 23–13)
- (8:03) TENN – McCallan Castles 43-yard pass from Joe Milton III (Charles Campbell kick) (Drive: 4 plays, 75 yards, 0:58; Tennessee 30–13)

Statistics	PEAY	TENN
First downs	19	17
Total yards	75–339	65–456
Rushing yards	34–79	32–228
Passing yards	260	228
Passing: Comp–Att–Int	29–41–1	21–33–0
Time of possession	39:01	20:44

Team	Category	Player	Statistics
Austin Peay	Passing	Mike DiLiello	29/39, 260 yards, TD, INT
Austin Peay	Rushing	Mike DiLiello	21 carries, 36 yards
Austin Peay	Receiving	Trey Goodman	3 receptions, 70 yards, TD
Tennessee	Passing	Joe Milton III	21/33, 228 yards, 2 TD
Tennessee	Rushing	Jaylen Wright	13 carries, 118 yards
Tennessee	Receiving	Ramel Keyton	5 receptions, 52 yards, TD

=== at Florida (rivalry) ===
Game Three: No. 11 Tennessee Volunteers (2–0) at Florida Gators (1–1) – Game summary

Quarter	1	2	3	4	Total
No. 11 Tennessee	7	0	3	6	16
Florida	6	20	0	3	29

at Ben Hill Griffin Stadium, Gainesville, Florida

- Date: September 16, 2023
- Game time: 7:00 p.m. EST
- Game weather: Sunny, 85 °F (29 °C)
- Game attendance: 90,751
- Referee: Scott Walker
- TV announcers (ESPN): Chris Fowler (play-by-play), Kirk Herbstreit (color), and Holly Rowe (sidelines)

Game information

First quarter

- (5:33) TENN – Ramel Keyton 11-yard pass from Joe Milton III (Charles Campbell kick) (Drive: 6 plays, 71 yards, 2:01; Tennessee 7–0)
- (4:10) FLA – Trevor Etienne 62-yard run (Adam Mihalek kick blocked) (Drive: 4 plays, 75 yards, 1:23; Tennessee 7–6)

Second quarter

- (9:28) FLA – Montrell Johnson Jr. 4-yard run (pass failed) (Drive: 14 plays, 82 yards, 7:28; Florida 12–7)
- (7:20) FLA – Graham Mertz 1-yard run (Trey Smack kick) (Drive: 3 plays, 9 yards, 1:32; Florida 19–7)
- (2:22) FLA – Montrell Johnson Jr. 18-yard pass from Graham Mertz (Trey Smack kick) (Drive: 7 plays, 55 yards, 3:30; Florida 26–7)

Third quarter

- (9:31) TENN – Charles Campbell 42-yard field goal (Drive: 14 plays, 46 yards, 5:29; Florida 26–10)

Fourth quarter

- (9:55) FLA – Trey Smack 27-yard field goal (Drive: 9 plays, 46 yards, 5:05; Florida 29–10)
- (8:41) TENN – Bru McCoy 55-yard pass from Joe Milton III (pass failed) (Drive: 5 plays, 75 yards, 1:14; Florida 29–16)

Statistics	TENN	FLA
First downs	17	21
Total yards	64–387	67–349
Rushing yards	30–100	43–183
Passing yards	287	166
Passing: Comp–Att–Int	20–34–1	19–24–0
Time of possession	22:32	37:28

Team	Category	Player	Statistics
Tennessee	Passing	Joe Milton III	20/34, 287 yards, 2 TD, INT
Tennessee	Rushing	Jaylen Wright	16 carries, 63 yards
Tennessee	Receiving	Bru McCoy	5 receptions, 94 yards, TD
Florida	Passing	Graham Mertz	19/24, 166 yards, TD
Florida	Rushing	Trevor Etienne	23 carries, 172 yards, TD
Florida	Receiving	Eugene Wilson III	6 receptions, 44 yards

=== vs UTSA ===
Game Four – UTSA Roadrunners (1–2) at No. 23 Tennessee Volunteers (2–1) – Game summary

Quarter	1	2	3	4	Total
UTSA	0	0	14	0	14
No. 23 Tennessee	14	17	0	14	45

at Neyland Stadium • Knoxville, Tennessee

- Date: September 23, 2023
- Game time: 4:00 p.m. EST
- Game weather: Sunny, 81 °F (27 °C)
- Game attendance: 101,915
- Referee: Jason Autrey
- TV announcers (SECN): Dave Neal (play-by-play), Derek Mason (analyst), Taylor Davis (sideline)

Game information

First quarter

- (14:40) TENN – Joe Milton III 81-yard run (Charles Campbell kick) (Drive: 1 play, 81 yards, 0:14; Tennessee 7–0)
- (10:03) TENN – Dylan Sampson 10-yard run (Charles Campbell kick) (Drive: 9 plays, 62 yards, 2:56; Tennessee 14–0)

Second quarter

- (14:23) TENN – Kaleb Webb 18-yard pass from Joe Milton III (Charles Campbell kick) (Drive: 2 plays, 43 yards, 0:26; Tennessee 21–0)
- (11:10) TENN – Ramel Keyton 48-yard pass from Joe Milton III (Charles Campbell kick) (Drive: 4 plays, 60 yards, 1:17; Tennessee 28–0)
- (3:21) TENN – Charles Campbell 29-yard field goal (Drive: 5 plays, 39 yards, 1:43; Tennessee 31–0)

Third quarter

- (7:32) UTSA – Joshua Cephus 3-yard pass from Owen McCown (Chase Allen kick) (Drive: 15 plays, 75 yards, 7:28; Tennessee 31–7)
- (5:16) UTSA – Tykee Ogle-Kellogg 43-yard pass from Owen McCown (Chase Allen kick) (Drive: 4 plays, 66 yards, 1:13; Tennessee 31–14)

Fourth quarter

- (12:42) TENN – Jabari Small 2-yard run (Charles Campbell kick) (Drive: 12 plays, 66 yards, 4:40; Tennessee 38–14)
- (10:17) TENN – Dylan Sampson 41-yard run (Charles Campbell kick) (Drive: 2 plays, 70 yards, 0:33; Tennessee 45–14)

Statistics	UTSA	TENN
First downs	16	21
Total yards	81–319	66–512
Rushing yards	40–88	33–303
Passing yards	231	209
Passing: Comp–Att–Int	30–41–2	18–33–0
Time of possession	37:12	22:48

Team	Category	Player	Statistics
UTSA	Passing	Owen McCown	18/20, 170 yards, 2 TD, INT
UTSA	Rushing	Kevorian Barnes	13 rushes, 40 yards
UTSA	Receiving	Joshua Cephus	7 receptions, 58 yards, TD
Tennessee	Passing	Joe Milton III	18/31, 209 yards, 2 TD
Tennessee	Rushing	Dylan Sampson	11 carries, 139 yards, 2 TD
Tennessee	Receiving	Ramel Keyton	1 reception, 48 yards, TD

=== vs South Carolina (rivalry) ===
Game Five – South Carolina Gamecocks (2–2) at No. 21 Tennessee Volunteers (3–1) – Game summary

Quarter	1	2	3	4	Total
South Carolina	10	0	7	3	20
No. 21 Tennessee	14	10	7	10	41

at Neyland Stadium • Knoxville, Tennessee

- Date: September 30, 2023
- Game time: 7:30 p.m. EST
- Game weather: Sunny, 83 °F (28 °C)
- Game attendance: 101,915
- Referee: Daniel Gatreaux
- TV announcers (SECN): Tom Hart (play-by-play), Jordan Rodgers (analyst), Cole Cubelic (sideline)

Game information

First quarter

- (9:26) TENN – Jaylen Wright 42-yard run (Charles Campbell kick) (Drive: 9 plays, 94 yards, 3:02; Tennessee 7–0)
- (5:47) SC – Mitch Jeter 36-yard field goal (Drive: 8 plays, 57 yards, 3:41; Tennessee 7–3)
- (2:03) SC – Spencer Rattler 6-yard run (Mitch Jeter kick) (Drive: 6 plays, 29 yards, 2:52; South Carolina 10–7)
- (0:42) TENN – Jabari Small 2-yard run (Charles Campbell kick) (Drive: 4 plays, 75 yards, 1:21; Tennessee 14–10)

Second quarter

- (8:50) TENN – Charles Campbell 24-yard field goal (Drive: 8 plays, 63 yards, 2:14; Tennessee 17–10)
- (0:47) TENN – Kamal Hadden 28-yard interception return (Charles Campbell kick) (Tennessee 24–10)

Third quarter

- (10:41) TENN – Jacob Warren 6-yard pass from Joe Milton III (Charles Campbell kick) (Drive: 12 plays, 75 yards, 4:19; Tennessee 31–10)
- (10:28) SC – Mario Anderson 75-yard run (Mitch Jeter kick) (Drive: 1 play, 75 yards, 0:13; Tennessee 31–17)

Fourth quarter

- (12:42) TENN – Charles Campbell 33-yard field goal (Drive: 7 plays, 23 yards, 4:03; Tennessee 34–17)
- (8:35) SC – Mitch Jeter 47-yard field goal (Drive: 9 plays, 45 yards, 4:07; Tennessee 34–20)
- (4:09) TENN – Dylan Sampson 6-yard run (Charles Campbell kick) (Drive: 9 plays, 75 yards, 4:26; Tennessee 41–20)

Statistics	SC	TENN
First downs	11	24
Total yards	63–333	72–477
Rushing yards	27–132	40–238
Passing yards	201	239
Passing: Comp–Att–Int	25–36–1	21–32–2
Time of possession	30:15	29:45

Team	Category	Player	Statistics
South Carolina	Passing	Spencer Rattler	24/35, 169 yards, INT
South Carolina	Rushing	Mario Anderson	10 carries, 101 yards, TD
South Carolina	Receiving	Trey Knox	7 receptions, 51 yards
Tennessee	Passing	Joe Milton III	21/32, 239 yards, TD, 2 INT
Tennessee	Rushing	Jaylen Wright	16 carries, 123 yards, TD
Tennessee	Receiving	Squirrel White	9 receptions, 104 yards

=== vs Texas A&M ===
Game Six – Texas A&M Aggies (4–2) at No. 19 Tennessee Volunteers (4–1) – Game summary

Quarter	1	2	3	4	Total
Texas A&M	7	3	3	0	13
No. 19 Tennessee	7	0	7	6	20

at Neyland Stadium • Knoxville, Tennessee

- Date: October 14, 2023
- Game time: 3:30 p.m. EST
- Game weather: Cloudy, 73 °F (23 °C)
- Game attendance: 101,915
- Referee: Matt Loeffler
- TV announcers (CBS): Brad Nessler (play-by-play), Gary Danielson (analyst), Jenny Dell (sideline)

Game information

First quarter

- TAMU – Max Johnson 2-yard run (Randy Bond kick), 8:29. Aggies 7–0. Drive: 9 plays, 80 yards, 4:15.
- TENN – Jacob Warren 7-yard pass from Joe Milton III (Charles Campbell kick), 1:44. Tied 7–7. Drive: 7 plays, 51 yards, 2:10.

Second quarter

- TAMU – Randy Bond 41-yard field goal, 10:48. Aggies 10–7. Drive: 11 plays, 51 yards, 5:56.

Third quarter

- TENN – Dee Williams 39-yard punt return (Charles Campbell kick), 6:47. Volunteers 14–10.
- TAMU – Randy Bond 24-yard field goal, 3:15. Volunteers 14–13. Drive: 8 plays, 68 yards, 3:32.

Fourth quarter

- TENN – Charles Campbell 31-yard field goal, 3:48. Volunteers 17–13. Drive: 11 plays, 53 yards, 4:46.
- TENN – Charles Campbell 24-yard field goal, 2:31. Volunteers 20–13. Drive: 4 plays, 0 yards, 0:54.

Statistics	TAMU	TENN
First downs	17	20
Total yards	277	332
Rushing yards	54	232
Passing yards	223	100
Passing: Comp–Att–Int	16–34–2	11–22–1
Time of possession	30:48	29:12

Team	Category	Player	Statistics
Texas A&M	Passing	Max Johnson	16/34, 223 yards, 2 INT
Texas A&M	Rushing	Le'Veon Moss	15 rushes, 62 yards
Texas A&M	Receiving	Noah Thomas	3 receptions, 75 yards
Tennessee	Passing	Joe Milton III	11/22, 100 yards, TD, INT
Tennessee	Rushing	Jaylen Wright	19 rushes, 136 yards
Tennessee	Receiving	Chas Nimrod	4 receptions, 31 yards

=== at No. 11 Alabama (rivalry) ===
Game Seven – No. 17 Tennessee Volunteers (5–1) at No. 11 Alabama Crimson Tide (6–1) – Game summary

Quarter	1	2	3	4	Total
No. 17 Tennessee	13	7	0	0	20
No. 11 Alabama	0	7	17	10	34

at Bryant-Denny Stadium, Tuscaloosa, Alabama

- Date: October 21, 2023
- Game time: 3:30 p.m. EST
- Game weather: Sunny, 80 °F (27 °C), NE @ 5 mph
- Game attendance: 100,077
- Referee: Ken Williamson
- TV announcers (CBS): Brad Nessler (play-by-play), Gary Danielson (analyst), Jenny Dell (sideline)

Game information

First quarter

- (12:39) TENN – Squirrel White 39-yard pass from Joe Milton III (Charles Campbell kick) (Drive: 8 plays, 75 yards, 2:21; Tennessee 7–0)
- (2:00) TENN – Charles Campbell 24-yard field goal (Drive: 15 plays, 79 yards, 5:30; Tennessee 10–0)
- (0:11) TENN – Charles Campbell 26-yard field goal (Drive: 5 plays, 15 yards, 1:05; Tennessee 13–0)

Second quarter

- (7:05) ALA – Jermaine Burton 10-yard pass from Jalen Milroe (Will Reichard kick) (Drive: 9 plays, 59 yards, 4:05; Tennessee 13–7)
- (0:12) TENN – McCallan Castles 6-yard pass from Joe Milton III (Charles Campbell kick) (Drive: 10 plays, 80 yards, 2:58; Tennessee 20–7)

Third quarter

- (14:19) ALA – Isaiah Bond 46-yard pass from Jalen Milroe (Will Reichard kick) (Drive: 2 plays, 75 yards, 0:41; Tennessee 20–14)
- (8:33) ALA – Will Reichard 42-yard field goal (Drive: 6 plays, 46 yards, 3:58; Tennessee 20–17)
- (3:42) ALA – Jase McClellan 5-yard run (Will Reichard kick) (Drive: 5 plays, 47 yards, 2:42; Alabama 24–20)

Fourth quarter

- (8:17) ALA – Will Reichard 50-yard field goal (Drive: 15 plays, 56 yards, 7:51; Alabama 27–20)
- (7:26) ALA – Jihaad Campbell 24-yard fumble return (Will Reichard kick) (Alabama 34–20)

Statistics	TENN	ALA
First downs	22	20
Total yards	404	358
Rushing yards	133	138
Passing yards	271	220
Passing: Comp–Att–Int	28–41–0	14–21–1
Time of possession	27:41	32:19

Team	Category	Player	Statistics
Tennessee	Passing	Joe Milton III	28/41, 271 yards, 2 TD
Tennessee	Rushing	Joe Milton III	15 carries, 59 yards
Tennessee	Receiving	Squirrel White	10 receptions, 111 yards, TD
Alabama	Passing	Jalen Milroe	14/21, 220 yards, 2 TD, INT
Alabama	Rushing	Jase McClellan	27 carries, 115 yards, TD
Alabama	Receiving	Isaiah Bond	3 receptions, 77 yards, TD

=== at Kentucky ===
Game Eight – No. 21 Tennessee Volunteers (5–2) at Kentucky Wildcats (5–2) – Game summary

Quarter	1	2	3	4	Total
No. 21 Tennessee	10	13	3	7	33
Kentucky	0	17	7	3	27

at Kroger Field, Lexington, Kentucky

- Date: October 28, 2023
- Game time: 7:00 p.m. EST
- Game attendance: 61,665
- Referee: Steve Marlowe
- TV announcers (ESPN): Mike Monaco (play-by-play), Jesse Palmer (analyst), Katie George (sideline)

Game information

First quarter

- (10:47) TENN – Jaylen Wright 52-yard run (Charles Campbell kick) (Drive: 5 plays, 70 yards, 1:48; Tennessee 7–0)
- (5:34) TENN – Charles Campbell 44-yard field goal (Drive: 6 plays, 8 yards, 3:03; Tennessee 10–0)

Second quarter

- (14:51) UK – Alex Raynor 28-yard field goal (Drive: 10 plays, 66 yards, 5:43; Tennessee 10–3)
- (11:13) TENN – Charles Campbell 49-yard field goal (Drive: 10 plays, 44 yards, 3:38; Tennessee 13–3)
- (7:38) UK – Barion Brown 11-yard pass from Devin Leary (Alex Raynor kick) (Drive: 7 plays, 75 yards, 3:35; Tennessee 13–10)
- (6:16) TENN – Chas Nimrod 39-yard pass from Joe Milton III (Charles Campbell kick) (Drive: 5 plays, 75 yards, 1:22; Tennessee 20–10)
- (1:46) UK – Ray Davis 7-yard run (Alex Raynor kick) (Drive: 10 plays, 75 yards, 4:30; Tennessee 20–17)
- (0:05) TENN – Charles Campbell 34-yard field goal (Drive: 7 plays, 59 yards, 1:41; Tennessee 23–17)

Third quarter

- (6:49) TENN – Charles Campbell 35-yard field goal (Drive: 8 plays, 49 yards, 3:38; Tennessee 26–17)
- (2:39) UK – Dane Key 7-yard pass from Devin Leary (Alex Raynor kick) (Drive: 6 plays, 75 yards, 4:10; Tennessee 26–24)

Fourth quarter

- (7:30) TENN – Dylan Sampson 12-yard run (Charles Campbell kick) (Drive: 12 plays, 65 yards, 3:27; Tennessee 33–24)
- (4:24) UK – Alex Raynor 28-yard field goal (Drive: 9 plays, 65 yards, 3:06; Tennessee 33–27)

Statistics	TENN	UK
First downs	24	24
Total yards	67–481	63–444
Rushing yards	47–254	24–72
Passing yards	227	372
Passing: Comp–Att–Int	17–20–0	28–39–0
Time of possession	26:56	33:04

Team	Category	Player	Statistics
Tennessee	Passing	Joe Milton III	17/20, 227 yards, 1 TD
Tennessee	Rushing	Jaylen Wright	11 carries, 120 yards, 1 TD
Tennessee	Receiving	Dont'e Thornton Jr.	3 receptions, 63 yards
Kentucky	Passing	Devin Leary	28/39, 372 yards, 2 TD
Kentucky	Rushing	Ray Davis	16 carries, 42 yards, 1 TD
Kentucky	Receiving	Dane Key	7 receptions, 113 yards, 1 TD

=== vs UConn ===
Game Nine – UConn Huskies (1–7) at No. 17 Tennessee Volunteers (6–2) – Game summary

Quarter	1	2	3	4	Total
UConn	3	0	0	0	3
No. 17 Tennessee	14	21	21	3	59

at Neyland Stadium • Knoxville, Tennessee

- Date: November 4, 2023
- Game time: 12:00 p.m. EST
- Game weather: Sunny, Wind 0 MPH, 54 °F (12 °C)
- Game attendance: 101,915
- Referee: Kyle Olson
- TV announcers (SECN): Dave Neal (play-by-play), Derek Mason (color analyst), Alex Chappell (sideline)

Game information

First quarter

- TEN – Jaylen Wright 82-yard run (Charles Campbell kick), 14:27. Volunteers 7–0. Drive: 2 plays, 85 yards, TOP 00:28
- CONN – Noe Ruelas 22-yard field goal, 2:47. Volunteers 7–3. Drive: 10 plays, 79 yards, TOP 06:49
- TEN – Ramel Keyton 60-yard pass from Joe Milton III (Charles Campbell kick), 1:38. Volunteers 14–3. Drive: 4 plays, 77 yards, TOP 01:01

Second quarter

- TEN – Joe Milton III 6-yard run (Charles Campbell kick), 7:25. Volunteers 21–3. Drive: 8 plays, 62 yards, TOP 02:47
- TEN – Squirrel White 83-yard pass from Joe Milton III (Charles Campbell kick), 4:34. Volunteers 28–3. Drive: 3 plays, 95 yards, TOP 00:47
- TEN – Tyler Baron 24-yard fumble recovery (Charles Campbell kick), 3:30. Volunteers 35–3.

Third quarter

- TEN – Jaylen McCollough 30-yard interception return (Charles Campbell kick), 14:52. Volunteers 42–3.
- TEN – Aaron Beasley 39-yard interception return (Charles Campbell kick), 11:51. Volunteers 49–3.
- TEN – McCallan Castles 19-yard pass from Nico Iamaleava (Josh Turbyville kick), 7:30. Volunteers 56–3. Drive: 8 plays, 78 yards, TOP 02:21

Fourth quarter

- TEN – Josh Turbyville 33-yard field goal, 8:02. Volunteers 59–3. Drive: 8 plays, 45 yards, TOP 02:13

Statistics	CONN	TENN
First downs	17	26
Total yards	256	650
Rushing yards	35	275
Passing yards	221	375
Passing: Comp–Att–Int	25–42–2	21–31–0
Time of possession	38:24	21:36

Team	Category	Player	Statistics
UConn	Passing	Ta'Quan Roberson	24/40, 218 yards
UConn	Rushing	Jalen Mitchell	8 carries, 28 yards
UConn	Receiving	Justin Joly	8 receptions, 89 yards
Tennessee	Passing	Joe Milton III	11/14, 254 yards, 2 TDs
Tennessee	Rushing	Jaylen Wright	8 carries, 113 yards, 1 TD
Tennessee	Receiving	Squirrel White	2 receptions, 94 yards, 1 TD

=== at No. 14 Missouri ===
Game Ten – No. 13 Tennessee Volunteers (7–2) at No. 14 Missouri Tigers (7–2) – Game summary

Quarter	1	2	3	4	Total
No. 13 Tennessee	0	7	0	0	7
No. 14 Missouri	0	13	9	14	36

at Faurot Field, Columbia, Missouri

- Date: November 11
- Game time: 3:30 p.m. EST
- Game weather: Sunny • 56 °F (13 °C) • 6 mph ESE wind
- Game attendance: 62,621
- Referee: David Smith
- TV announcers (CBS): Brad Nessler (play-by-play), Gary Danielson (color), and Jenny Dell (sidelines)

Game information

First quarter

No scoring

Second quarter

- (14:16) MIZZ: Harrison Mevis 31-yard field goal (Drive: 20 plays, 72 yards, 10:55; Missouri 3–0)
- (12:15) TENN: Dont'e Thornton Jr. 46-yard pass from Joe Milton III (Charles Campbell kick) (Drive: 6 plays, 75 yards, 1:51; Tennessee 7–3)
- (10:33) MIZZ: Cody Schrader 7-yard run (Harrison Mevis kick) (Drive: 5 plays, 75 yards, 1:52; Missouri 10–7)
- (0:00) MIZZ: Harrison Mevis 46-yard field goal (Drive: 4 plays, 53 yards, 0:20; Missouri 13–7)

Third quarter

- (10:04) MIZZ: Brady Cook 3-yard run (pass failed) (Drive: 7 plays, 80 yards, 3:05; Missouri 19–7)
- (2:38) MIZZ: Harrison Mevis 23-yard field goal (Drive: 9 plays, 59 yards, 5:04; Missouri 22–7)

Fourth quarter

- (6:21) MIZZ: Luther Burden III 21-yard pass from Brady Cook (Harrison Mevis kick) (Drive: 6 plays, 66 yards, 4:36; Missouri 29–7)
- (5:50) MIZZ: Daylan Carnell 38-yard interception return (Harrison Mevis kick) (Missouri 36–7)

Statistics	TENN	MIZZ
First downs	15	26
Total yards	350	530
Rushing yards	83	255
Passing yards	267	275
Passing: Comp–Att–Int	22–34–1	18–24–1
Time of possession	20:04	39:56

Team	Category	Player	Statistics
Tennessee	Passing	Joe Milton	22–34, 267 yards, 1 TD, 1 INT
Tennessee	Rushing	Joe Milton	10 carries, 36 yards
Tennessee	Receiving	Ramel Keyton	4 receptions, 57 yards
Missouri	Passing	Brady Cook	18–24, 275 yards, 1 TD, 1 INT
Missouri	Rushing	Cody Schrader	35 carries, 205 yards, 1 TD
Missouri	Receiving	Cody Schrader	5 receptions, 116 yards

=== vs No. 1 Georgia ===
Game Eleven – No. 1 Georgia Bulldogs (10–0) at No. 18 Tennessee Volunteers (7–3) – Game summary

Quarter	1	2	3	4	Total
No. 1 Georgia	10	14	14	0	38
No. 18 Tennessee	7	3	0	0	10

at Neyland Stadium • Knoxville, Tennessee

- Date: November 18
- Game time: 3:30pm
- Game weather: Sunny • 64 °F (18 °C)
- Game attendance: 101,915
- TV announcers (CBS/SEC Nation): Brad Nessler (play-by-play), Gary Danielson (color), and Jenny Dell (sidelines)

Game information

First Quarter

- (14:49) Jaylen Wright 75-yard Run (Charles Campbell Kick) (Drive: 1 play, 75 yards, 0:11; Tennessee 7–0)
- (10:01) Peyton Woodring 42-yard Field Goal (Drive: 11 plays, 51 yards, 4:48; Tennessee 7–3)
- (3:17) Marcus Rosemy-Jacksaint 18-yard pass from Dillon Bell (Peyton Woodring Kick) (Drive: 9 plays, 65 yards, 4:57; Georgia 10–7)

Second Quarter

- (8:04) Dillon Bell 9-yard pass from Carson Beck (Peyton Woodring Kick) (Drive: 9 plays, 80 yards, 5:02; Georgia 17–7)
- (1:31) Brock Bowers 3-yard pass from Carson Beck (Peyton Woodring Kick) (Drive: 8 plays, 71 yards, 4:54; Georgia 24–7)
- (0:00) Charles Campbell 37-yard Field Goal (Drive: 9 plays, 56 yards, 1:31; Georgia 24–10)

Third Quarter

- (9:24) Marcus Rosemy-Jacksaint 8-yard pass from Carson Beck (Peyton Woodring Kick) (Drive: 6 plays, 70 yards, 3:53; Georgia 31–10)
- (1:03) Kendall Milton 15-yard Run (Peyton Woodring Kick) (Drive: 10 plays, 68 yards, 6:27; Georgia 38–10)

Fourth quarter

- no scoring (Georgia 38–10)

Statistics	No. 1 UGA	No. 18 TENN
First downs	27	13
Total yards	472	277
Rushing yards	156	130
Passing yards	316	147
Passing: Comp–Att–Int	25–31–0	17–30–0
Time of possession	40:58	19:02

Team	Category	Player	Statistics
No. 1 Georgia	Passing	Carson Beck	24/30, 298 yards, 3 TD
No. 1 Georgia	Rushing	Kendall Milton	11 carries, 34 yards, 1 TD
No. 1 Georgia	Receiving	Marcus Rosemy-Jacksaint	7 receptions, 91 yards, 2 TD
No. 18 Tennessee	Passing	Joe Milton	17/30, 147 yards
No. 18 Tennessee	Rushing	Jaylen Wright	9 carries, 90 yards
No. 18 Tennessee	Receiving	Squirrel White	5 receptions, 45 yards

=== vs Vanderbilt (rivalry) ===
Game Twelve – Vanderbilt Commodores (2–9) at No. 21 Tennessee Volunteers (7–4) – Game summary

Quarter	1	2	3	4	Total
Vanderbilt	7	3	0	14	24
No. 21 Tennessee	14	17	14	3	48

at Neyland Stadium, Knoxville, TN

- Date: November 25
- Game time: 3:30 p.m. EST
- Game weather: Cloudy • 59 °F (15 °C)
- Game attendance: 101,915
- Referee: Ken Williamson
- TV announcers (SECN): Dave Neal (play-by-play), Derek Mason (color), and Taylor Davis (sidelines)

Game information

First quarter

- (14:00) TENN – Ramel Keyton 56-yard pass from Joe Milton III (Charles Campbell kick) (Drive: 3 plays, 76 yards, 0:55; Tennessee 7–0)
- (11:34) VAN – Junior Sherrill 19-yard pass from AJ Swann (Jacob Borcila kick) (Drive: 4 plays, 73 yards, 2:19; Tied 7–7)
- (3:13) TENN – McCallan Castles 10-yard pass from Joe Milton III (Charles Campbell kick) (Drive: 4 plays, 39 yards, 1:03; Tennessee 14–7)

Second quarter

- (14:09) TENN – Jacob Warren 34-yard pass from Joe Milton III (Charles Campbell kick) (Drive: 4 plays, 73 yards, 1:12; Tennessee 21–7)
- (8:29) VAN – Jacob Borcila 40-yard field goal (Drive: 11 plays, 54 yards, 5:40; Tennessee 21–10)
- (6:04) TENN – Charles Campbell 24-yard field goal (Drive: 7 plays, 59 yards, 2:17; Tennessee 24–10)
- (0:05) TENN – Joe Milton III 2-yard run (Charles Campbell kick) (Drive: 8 plays, 54 yards, 2:29; Tennessee 31–10)

Third quarter

- (9:33) TENN – Ramel Keyton 46-yard pass from Joe Milton III (Charles Campbell kick) (Drive: 6 plays, 80 yards, 1:28; Tennessee 38–10)
- (0:13) TENN – Joe Milton III 2-yard run (Charles Campbell kick) (Drive: 10 plays, 81 yards, 3:30; Tennessee 45–10)

Fourth quarter

- (12:47) VAN – Ken Seals 1-yard run (Jacob Borcila kick) (Drive: 3 plays, 8 yards, 1:02; Tennessee 45–17)
- (5:36) VAN – Quincy Skinner Jr. 5-yard pass from Ken Seals (Jacob Borcila kick) (Drive: 9 plays, 77 yards, 5:08; Tennessee 45–24)
- (0:28) TENN – Charles Campbell 27-yard field goal (Drive: 17 plays, 66 yards, 5:10; Tennessee 48–24)

Statistics	VAN	TENN
First downs	22	31
Total yards	306	617
Rushing yards	78	168
Passing yards	228	449
Passing: Comp–Att–Int	21–32–0	31–47–0
Time of possession	34:21	25:39

Team	Category	Player	Statistics
Vanderbilt	Passing	AJ Swann	14/23, 167 yards, TD
Vanderbilt	Rushing	Sedrick Alexander	11 carries, 46 yards
Vanderbilt	Receiving	Junior Sherrill	4 receptions, 52 yards, TD
Tennessee	Passing	Joe Milton III	22/33, 383 yards, 4 TD
Tennessee	Rushing	Jaylen Wright	11 carries, 75 yards
Tennessee	Receiving	Ramel Keyton	4 receptions, 122 yards, 2 TD

=== vs No. 17 Iowa (Citrus Bowl) ===
Citrus Bowl
No. 17 Iowa Hawkeyes (10–3) vs No. 21 Tennessee Volunteers (8–4) – Game summary

Quarter	1	2	3	4	Total
No. 17 Hawkeyes	0	0	0	0	0
No. 21 Volunteers	0	14	7	14	35

at Camping World Stadium, Orlando, Florida

- Date: January 1, 2024
- Game time: 1:00 pm
- Game weather: Sunny • 67 °F (19 °C)
- Game attendance: 43,861
- Referee: Jeff Heaser (ACC)
- TV announcers (ABC): Dave Flemming (play-by-play), Brock Osweiler (color), and Kayla Burton (sidelines)

Game information

First quarter

no scoring

Second quarter

- (14:54) TENN – Nico Iamaleava 19-yard run (Charles Campbell kick) (Drive: 7 plays, 73 yards, 2:13; Tennessee 7–0)
- (8:12) TENN – Nico Iamaleava 3-yard run (Charles Campbell kick) (Drive: 11 plays, 68 yards, 5:09; Tennessee 14–0)

Third quarter

- (1:43) TENN – Nico Iamaleava 2-yard run (Charles Campbell kick) (Drive: 2 plays, 2 yards, 0:42; Tennessee 21–0)

Fourth quarter

- (14:15) TENN – James Pearce Jr. 52-yard interception return (Charles Campbell kick) (Tennessee 28–0)
- (4:48) TENN – McCallan Castles 18-yard pass from Nico Iamaleava (Charles Campbell kick) (Drive: 8 plays, 78 yards, 3:16; Tennessee 35–0)

Statistics	IOWA	TENN
First downs	11	25
Total yards	173	383
Rushing yards	113	232
Passing yards	60	151
Turnovers	3	0
Time of possession	29:48	30:12

Team	Category	Player	Statistics
Iowa	Passing	Deacon Hill	7/18, 56 yards, 2 INT
Iowa	Rushing	Marco Lainez	6 carries, 51 yards
Iowa	Receiving	Kaleb Brown	3 receptions, 39 yards
Tennessee	Passing	Nico Iamaleava	12/19, 151 yards, TD
Tennessee	Rushing	Dylan Sampson	20 carries, 133 yards
Tennessee	Receiving	Ramel Keyton	3 receptions, 51 yards

== Rankings ==
Ranking movements Legend: ██ Increase in ranking ██ Decrease in ranking RV = Received votes т = Tied with team above or below
	Week															
Poll	Pre	1	2	3	4	5	6	7	8	9	10	11	12	13	14	Final
AP	12	9	11	23	21	22	19т	17	21	19	14	21	25	RV	25	17
Coaches	10	9	9	20	19	18	17	15	20	16	12	19	23	23	23	17
CFP	Not released									17	13	18	21	21	21	Not released

== Players drafted into the NFL ==
Tennessee had three players selected in the 2024 NFL draft.

Round	Pick	Player	Position	NFL club
4	120	Jaylen Wright	RB	Miami Dolphins
6	193	Joe Milton	QB	New England Patriots
6	211	Kamal Hadden	CB	Kansas City Chiefs
