= 2022 Florida Gators football team =

American college football season

2022 Florida Gators football

Las Vegas Bowl, L 3–30 vs. Oregon State
- Conference: Southeastern Conference
- Eastern Division
- Record: 6–7 (3–5 SEC)
- Head coach: Billy Napier (1st season)
- Offensive coordinator: Rob Sale (1st season)
- Offensive scheme: Pro-style
- Co-defensive coordinators: Patrick Toney (1st season); Sean Spencer (1st season)
- Base defense: 4–2–5
- Home stadium: Ben Hill Griffin Stadium

2022 Southeastern Conference football standings
	Conf.			Overall
Team	W		L	W		L
Eastern Division
No. 1 Georgia xy$#^	8	–	0	15	–	0
No. 6 Tennessee	6	–	2	11	–	2
No. 23 South Carolina	4	–	4	8	–	5
Kentucky	3	–	5	7	–	6
Florida	3	–	5	6	–	7
Missouri	3	–	5	6	–	7
Vanderbilt	2	–	6	5	–	7
Western Division
No. 16 LSU xy	6	–	2	10	–	4
No. 5 Alabama x	6	–	2	11	–	2
No. 20 Mississippi State	4	–	4	9	–	4
Ole Miss	4	–	4	8	–	5
Arkansas	3	–	5	7	–	6
Auburn	2	–	6	5	–	7
Texas A&M	2	–	6	5	–	7
Championship: Georgia 50, LSU 30
# – College Football Playoff champion; ^ – College Football Playoff participant; $ – Conference champion; x – Division champion/co-champions; y – Championship game participant; Rankings from AP Poll

The 2022 Florida Gators football team represented the University of Florida in the 2022 NCAA Division I FBS football season. The Gators played their home games at Ben Hill Griffin Stadium in Gainesville, Florida, and competed in the Eastern Division of the Southeastern Conference (SEC). They were led by first-year head coach Billy Napier.

== Schedule ==
Date	Time	Opponent	Rank	Site	TV	Result	Attendance
September 3	7:00 p.m.	No. 7 Utah*		Ben Hill Griffin Stadium; Gainesville, FL	ESPN	W 29–26	90,799
September 10	7:00 p.m.	No. 20 Kentucky	No. 12	Ben Hill Griffin Stadium; Gainesville, FL (rivalry)	ESPN	L 16–26	89,993
September 17	7:30 p.m.	South Florida*	No. 18	Ben Hill Griffin Stadium; Gainesville, FL	SECN	W 31–28	88,496
September 24	3:30 p.m.	at No. 11 Tennessee	No. 20	Neyland Stadium; Knoxville, TN (rivalry, College GameDay)	CBS	L 33–38	101,915
October 2 (Note: The EWU game was moved back by one day due to Hurricane Ian.)	12:00 p.m.	No. 20 (FCS) Eastern Washington*		Ben Hill Griffin Stadium; Gainesville, FL	ESPN+/SECN+	W 52–17	72,462
October 8	12:00 p.m.	Missouri^{†}		Ben Hill Griffin Stadium; Gainesville, FL	ESPNU	W 24–17	88,471
October 15	7:00 p.m.	LSU		Ben Hill Griffin Stadium; Gainesville, FL (rivalry)	ESPN	L 35–45	90,585
October 29	3:30 p.m.	vs. No. 1 Georgia		TIAA Bank Field; Jacksonville, FL (rivalry)	CBS	L 20–42	75,868
November 5	12:00 p.m.	at Texas A&M		Kyle Field; College Station, TX	ESPN	W 41–24	97,797
November 12	4:00 p.m.	South Carolina		Ben Hill Griffin Stadium; Gainesville, FL	SECN	W 38–6	89,454
November 19	12:00 p.m.	at Vanderbilt		FirstBank Stadium; Nashville, TN	SECN	L 24–31	30,136
November 25	7:30 p.m.	at No. 16 Florida State*		Doak Campbell Stadium; Tallahassee, FL (rivalry)	ABC	L 38–45	79,560
December 17	2:30 p.m.	vs. No. 14 Oregon State*		Allegiant Stadium; Paradise, NV (Las Vegas Bowl)	ESPN	L 3–30	29,750
*Non-conference game; ^{†}Homecoming; Rankings from AP Poll (and CFP Rankings, after November 1) released prior to game; All times are in Eastern time

== Rankings ==
Ranking movements Legend: ██ Increase in ranking ██ Decrease in ranking — = Not ranked RV = Received votes
	Week															
Poll	Pre	1	2	3	4	5	6	7	8	9	10	11	12	13	14	Final
AP	RV	12	18	20	RV	RV	RV	—	—	—	—	RV	—	—	—	—
Coaches	RV	19	21	22	RV	RV	RV	—	—	—	—	RV	—	—	—	—
CFP	Not released									—	—	—	—	—	—	Not released

== Game summaries ==
=== No. 7 Utah ===
No. 7 Utah Utes at Florida Gators – Game summary

Quarter	1	2	3	4	Total
No. 7 Utah	7	6	6	7	26
Florida	7	7	0	15	29

at Ben Hill Griffin Stadium • Gainesville, FL

- Date: September 3, 2022
- Game time: 7:00 p.m. EDT
- Game weather: Temperature: 77 °F (25 °C) • Wind: NE at 2 miles per hour (3.2 km/h) • Weather: Rain
- Game attendance: 90,799
- Referee: Chris Coyte
- TV announcers (ESPN): Bob Wischusen (play-by-play), Dan Orlovsky (color), Kris Budden (sideline reporter)
- Boxscore

Game information

First quarter

- Utah – Brant Kuithe 7-yard pass from Cameron Rising (Jordan Noyes kick), 11:23
- Florida – Anthony Richardson 2-yard run (Adam Mihalek kick), 0:39

Second quarter

- Utah – Jordan Noyes 43-yard field goal, 10:26
- Utah – Jordan Noyes 31-yard field goal, 3:18
- Florida – Anthony Richardson 45-yard run (Adam Mihalek kick), 1:42

Third quarter

- Utah – Micah Bernard 7-yard run, 0:12

Fourth quarter

- Florida – Montrell Johnson Jr. 14-yard run (Anthony Richardson pass to Ja'Quavion Fraziers), 12:48
- Utah – Tavion Thomas 4-yard run (Jordan Noyes kick), 6:26
- Florida – Anthony Richardson 2-yard run (Adam Mihalek kick), 1:25

Passing leaders

- Utah – Cameron Rising – 22/32, 316 yards, 1 touchdown, 1 interception
- Florida – Anthony Richardson – 17/24, 168 yards

Rushing leaders

- Utah – Tavion Thomas – 23 carries, 115 yards, 1 touchdown
- Florida – Anthony Richardson – 11 carries, 106 yards, 3 touchdowns

Receiving leaders

- Utah – Brant Kuithe – 9 receptions, 105 yards, 1 touchdown
- Florida – Ricky Pearsall – 4 receptions, 67 yards

Tackling leaders

- Utah – Cole Bishop – 12 tackles
- Florida – Trey Dean – 12 tackles

=== No. 20 Kentucky ===
No. 20 Kentucky Wildcats (1–0) at No. 12 Florida Gators (1–0) – Game summary

Quarter	1	2	3	4	Total
No. 20 Kentucky	0	13	10	3	26
No. 12 Florida	3	13	0	0	16

at Ben Hill Griffin Stadium • Gainesville, FL

- Date: September 10, 2022
- Game time: 7:00 p.m. EDT
- Game weather: Cloudy
- Game attendance: 89,993
- Referee: Matt Loeffler
- TV announcers (ESPN): Joe Tessitore (play-by-play), Greg McElroy (color), Katie George (sideline reporter)
- Boxscore

Game information

First quarter

- Florida – Adam Mihalek 39-yard field goal, 10:51

Second quarter

- Kentucky – Dane Key 55-yard pass from Will Levis (Matt Ruffolo kick), 11:36
- Florida – Adam Mihalek 50-yard field goal, 10:01
- Florida – Trevor Etienne 12-yard rush (Anthony Richardson pass to Trevor Etienne), 5:49
- Florida – Team safety, 4:12
- Kentucky – Will Levis 1-yard rush, 1:25

Third quarter

- Kentucky – Matt Ruffolo 24-yard field goal, 6:35
- Kentucky – Keidron Smith 65-yard interception return (Matt Ruffolo kick), 3:25

Fourth quarter

- Kentucky – Mark Ruffolo 25-yard field goal, 1:24

Passing leaders

- Kentucky – Will Levis – 13/24, 202 yards, 1 touchdown, 1 interception
- Florida – Anthony Richardson – 14/35, 143 yards, 2 interceptions

Rushing leaders

- Kentucky – Kavosiey Smoke – 14 carries, 80 yards
- Florida – Montrell Johnson, Jr – 7 carries, 62 yards

Receiving leaders

- Kentucky – Dane Key – 3 receptions, 81 yards, 1 touchdown
- Florida – Xzavier Henderson – 6 receptions, 50 yards

Tackling leaders

- Kentucky – J. J. Weaver – 9 tackles
- Florida – Trey Dean, 9 tackles

=== South Florida ===
South Florida Bulls (1–1) at No. 18 Florida Gators (1–1) – Game summary

Quarter	1	2	3	4	Total
South Florida	7	6	8	7	28
No. 18 Florida	3	21	0	7	31

at Ben Hill Griffin Stadium • Gainesville, FL

- Date: September 17, 2022
- Game time: 7:30 p.m. EDT
- Game weather: Temperature: 77 °F (25 °C) • Wind: NE at 2 miles per hour (3.2 km/h) • Weather: Clear
- Game attendance: 88,496
- Referee: David Smith
- TV announcers (SECN): Tom Hart (play-by-play), Jordan Rodgers (color), Cole Cubelic (sideline reporter)
- Boxscore

Game information

First quarter

- Florida – Adam Mihalek 31-yard field goal, 8:12
- South Florida – Brian Battie 10-yard run (Spencer Shrader kick), 1:21

Second quarter

- Florida – Montrell Johnson Jr. 62-yard run (Adam Mihalek kick), 14:49
- South florida – Spencer Shrader 22-yard field goal, 10:45
- Florida – Nay'Quan Wright 7-yard run (Adam Mihalek kick), 4:45
- Florida – Jalen Kimber 39-yard interception return (Adam Mihalek kick), 3:10
- South Florida – Spencer Shrader 49-yard field goal, 0:10

Third quarter

- South Florida – Gerry Bohanon 6-yard run (Gerry Bohannon pass to Xavier Weaver), 10:27

Fourth quarter

- South Florida – Michel Dukes 1 yard run (Spencer Shrader kick), 11:14
- Florida – Trevor Etienne 3-yard run (Adam Mihalek kick), 5:05

Passing leaders

- South Florida – Gerry Bohanon – 12/28, 116 yards, 2 interceptions
- Florida – Anthony Richardson – 10/18, 112 yards, 2 interceptions

Rushing leaders

- South Florida – Brian Battie – 17 carries, 150 yards, 1 touchdown
- Florida – Montrell Johnson Jr. – 6 carries, 103 yards, 1 touchdown

Receiving leaders

- South Florida – Xavier Weaver – 8 receptions, 82 yards
- Florida – Justin Shorter – 2 receptions, 33 yards; Trent Whittemore – 1 reception, 33 yards

Tackling leaders

- South Florida – Antonio Grier – 10 tackles
- Florida – Trey Dean & Brenton Cox Jr. – 9 tackles

=== No. 11 Tennessee ===
No. 20 Florida Gators (2–1) at No. 11 Tennessee Volunteers (3–0) – Game summary

Quarter	1	2	3	4	Total
No. 20 Florida	0	14	7	12	33
No. 11 Tennessee	3	14	14	7	38

at Neyland Stadium • Knoxville, TN

- Date: September 24, 2022
- Game time: 3:30 p.m. EDT
- Game weather: Temperature: 72 °F (22 °C) • Wind: Calm • Weather: Cloudy
- Game attendance: 101,915
- Referee: Scott Walker
- TV announcers (CBS): Brad Nessler (play-by-play), Gary Danielson (color), Jenny Dell (sideline reporter)
- Boxscore

Game information

First quarter

- Tennessee – Chase McGrath 32-yard field goal, 1:11

Second quarter

- Florida – Keon Zipperer 44-yard pass from Anthony Richardson (Adam Mihalek kick), 12:41
- Tennessee – Hendon Hooker 4-yard run (Chase McGrath kick), 11:59
- Florida – Anthony Richardson 7-yard run (Adam Mihalek kick), 8:28
- Tennessee – Bru McCoy 1 yard pass from Hendon Hooker (Chase McGrath kick), 0:07

Third quarter

- Tennessee – Jabari Small 16-yard pass from Hendon Hooker (Chase McGrath kick), 12:08
- Florida – Anthony Richardson 1 yard run (Adam Mihalek kick), 5:55
- Tennessee – Jabari Small 1 yard run (Chase McGrath kick), 3:58

Fourth quarter

- Tennessee – Jaylen Wright 5-yard run (Chase McGrath kick), 7:55
- Florida – Montrell Johnson Jr. 5-yard run, 4:49
- Florida – Ricky Pearsall 3-yard pass from Anthony Richardson, 0:17

Passing leaders

- Florida – Anthony Richardson – 24/44, 453 yards, 2 touchdowns, 1 interception
- Tennessee – Hendon Hooker – 22/28, 349 yards, 2 touchdowns

Rushing leaders

- Florida – Anthony Richardson – 17 carries, 67 yards, 2 touchdowns
- Tennessee – Hendon Hooker – 13 carries, 112 yards, 1 touchdown

Receiving leaders

- Florida – Justin Shorter – 7 receptions, 155 yards
- Tennessee – Bru McCoy – 5 receptions, 102 yards, 1 touchdown

Tackling leaders

- Florida – Rashad Torrence II – 13 tackles
- Tennessee – Jeremy Banks & Kamal Hadden – 7 tackles

=== No. 20 Eastern Washington (FCS) ===
Eastern Washington Eagles (1–2) at Florida Gators (2–2) – Game summary

Quarter	1	2	3	4	Total
No. 20 (FCS) Eastern Washington	3	0	0	14	17
Florida	14	21	10	7	52

at Ben Hill Griffin Stadium • Gainesville, FL

- Date: October 2, 2022
- Game time: 12:00 p.m. EDT
- Game weather: Temperature: 75 °F (24 °C) • Wind: NW at 2 miles per hour (3.2 km/h) • Weather: Sunny
- Game attendance: 72,462
- Referee: James Carter
- TV announcers (ESPN+/SECN+): Drew Carter (play-by-play), Aaron Murray (color), Monica Uber (sideline reporter)
- Boxscore

Game information

First quarter

- Eastern Washington – Seth Harrison 44-yard field goal, 8:04
- Florida – Justin Shorter 75-yard pass from Anthony Richardson (Adam Mihalek kick), 7:53
- Florida – Montrell Johnson Jr. 3-yard run (Adam Mihalek kick), 1:13

Second quarter

- Florida – Nay'Quan Wright 4-yard (Adam Mihalek kick), 9:22
- Florida – Ricky Pearsall 76-yard run (Adam Mihalek kick), 5:48
- Florida – Xzavier Henderson 21-yard pass from Anthony Richardson (Adam Mihalek kick), 3:02

Third quarter

- Florida – Adam Mihalek 36-yard field goal, 7:47
- Florida – Caleb Douglas 62-yard pass from Jalen Kitna (Adam Mihalek kick), 4:25

Fourth quarter

- Florida – Lorenzo Lingard 11-yard run (Adam Mihalek kick), 11:53
- Eastern Washington – Jakobie James 28-yard pass from Gunner Talkington (Seth Harrison kick), 8:35
- Eastern Washington – Kekoa Visperas 25-yard run (Seth Harrison kick), 3:17

Passing leaders

- Eastern Washington – Gunner Talkington – 24/37, 250 yards, 1 touchdown
- Florida – Anthony Richardson – 8/10, 240 yards, 2 touchdowns, 1 interception

Rushing leaders

- Eastern Washington – Tuna Altahir – 15 carries, 48 yards
- Florida – Ricky Pearsall – 1 carry, 76 yards, 1 touchdown

Receiving leaders

- Eastern Washington – Freddie Roberson – 4 receptions, 62 yards
- Florida – Justin Shorter – 1 reception, 75 yards, 1 touchdown

Tackling leaders

- Eastern Washington – Sherwin King Jr. – 6 tackles
- Florida – Rashad Torrence II – 10 tackles

=== Missouri ===
Missouri Tigers (2–3) at Florida Gators (3–2) – Game summary

Quarter	1	2	3	4	Total
Missouri	0	10	0	7	17
Florida	10	0	7	7	24

at Ben Hill Griffin Stadium • Gainesville, FL

- Date: October 8, 2022
- Game time: 12:00 p.m. EDT
- Game weather: Temperature: 82 °F (28 °C) • Wind: N at 3 miles per hour (4.8 km/h) • Weather: Sunny
- Game attendance: 88,471
- Referee: David Smith
- TV announcers (ESPNU): John Schriffen (play-by-play), Dustin Fox (color), Lauren Sisler (sideline reporter)
- Boxscore

Game information

First quarter

- Florida – Adam Mihalek 37-yard field goal, 2:58
- Florida – Jaydon Hill 49-yard interception return (Adam Mihalek kick), 1:01

Second quarter

- Missouri – Cody Schrader 6-yard run (Harrison Mevis kick), 3:55
- Missouri – Harrison Mevis 28-yard field goal, 0:20

Third quarter

- Florida – Montrell Johnson Jr. 3-yard run (Adam Mihalek kick), 6:55

Fourth quarter

- Florida – Ricky Pearsall 9-yard pass from Anthony Richardson (Adam Mihalek kick), 11:10
- Missouri – Nathaniel Peat 18-yard run (Harrison Mevis kick), 5:58

Passing leaders

- Missouri – Brady Cook – 22/30, 220 yards, 2 interceptions
- Florida – Anthony Richardson – 8/14, 66 yards, 1 touchdown, 1 interception

Rushing leaders

- Missouri – Nathaniel Peat – 20 carries, 117 yards, 1 touchdown
- Florida – Montrell Johnson Jr. – 8 carries, 86 yards, 1 touchdown

Receiving leaders

- Missouri – Mookie Cooper – 4 receptions, 58 yards
- Florida – Justin Shorter – 1 reception, 20 yards

Tackling leaders

- Missouri – Isaiah McGuire – 7 tackles
- Florida – Ventral Miller – 11 tackles

=== LSU ===
LSU Tigers (4–2) at Florida Gators (4–2) – Game summary

Quarter	1	2	3	4	Total
LSU	7	21	14	3	45
Florida	14	7	0	14	35

at Ben Hill Griffin Stadium • Gainesville, FL

- Date: October 15, 2022
- Game time: 7:00 p.m. EDT
- Game weather: Temperature: 77 °F (25 °C) • Wind: E at 3 miles per hour (4.8 km/h) • Weather: Sunny
- Game attendance: 90,585
- Referee: Matt Loeffler
- TV announcers (ESPN): Joe Tessitore (play-by-play), Greg McElroy (color), Katie George (sideline reporter)
- Boxscore

Game information

First quarter

- Florida – Justin Shorter 51-yard pass from Anthony Richardson (Adam Mihalek kick), 14:01
- LSU – John Emery Jr. 7-yard pass from Jayden Daniels (Damian Ramos kick), 7:46
- Florida – Montrell Johnson Jr. 39-yard run (Adam Mihalek kick), 2:00

Second quarter

- LSU – Jayden Daniels 1 yard run (Damian Ramos kick), 11:55
- Florida – Montrell Johnson Jr. 3-yard run (Adam Mihalek kick), 8:13
- LSU – Brian Thomas Jr. 24-yard pass from Jayden Daniels (Damian Ramos kick), 5:55
- LSU – Jaray Jenkins 54-yard pass from Jayden Daniels (Damian Ramos kick), 2:24

Third quarter

- LSU – Jayden Daniels 12-yard run (Damian Ramos kick), 13:17
- LSU – Jayden Daniels 9-yard run (Damian Ramos kick), 1:07

Fourth quarter

- Florida – Anthony Richardson 81-yard run (Adam Mihalek kick), 14:46
- Florida – Trevor Etienne 1 yard run (Adam Mihalek kick), 7:39
- LSU – Damian Ramos 46-yard field goal, 1:52

Passing leaders

- LSU – Jayden Daniels – 23/32, 349 yards, 3 touchdowns
- Florida – Anthony Richardson – 15/25, 185 yards, 1 touchdown

Rushing leaders

- LSU – Josh Williams – 14 carries, 106 yards
- Florida – Anthony Richardson – 9 carries, 109 yards, 1 touchdown

Receiving leaders

- LSU – Kayshon Boutte – 6 receptions, 115 yards
- Florida – Ricky Pearsall – 2 receptions, 49 yards

Tackling leaders

- LSU – Micah Baskerville – 11 tackles
- Florida – Ventrell Miller – 10 tackles

=== No. 1 Georgia ===
Florida Gators (4–3) vs. No. 1 Georgia Bulldogs (7–0) – Game summary

Quarter	1	2	3	4	Total
Florida	0	3	17	0	20
No. 1 Georgia	14	14	7	7	42

at TIAA Bank Field • Jacksonville, FL

- Date: October 29, 2022
- Game time: 3:30 p.m. EDT
- Game weather: Temperature: 68 °F (20 °C) • Wind: NE at 7 miles per hour (11 km/h) • Weather: Cloudy
- Game attendance: 75,868
- Referee: Scott Walker
- TV announcers (CBS): Brad Nessler (play-by-play), Gary Danielson (color), Jenny Dell (sideline reporter)
- Boxscore

Game information

First quarter

- Georgia – Daijun Edwards 1 yard run (Jack Podlesny kick), 7:15
- Georgia – Kenny McIntosh 2-yard run (Jack Podlesny kick), 1:30

Second quarter

- Georgia – Brock Bowers 73-yard pass from Stetson Bennett (Jack Podlesny kick), 12:36
- Florida – Adam Mihalek 52-yard field goal, 5:35
- Georgia – Ladd McConkey 7-yard pass from Stetson Bennett (Jack Podlesny kick), 0:17

Third quarter

- Florida – Trevor Etienne 3-yard run (Jack Podlesny kick), 9:38
- Florida – Adam Mihalek 26-yard field goal, 6:07
- Florida – Xzavier Henderson 78-yard pass from Anthony Richardson (Adam Mihalek kick), 3:31
- Georgia – Daijun Edwards 22-yard run (Jack Podlesny kick), 0:35

Fourth quarter

- Georgia – Kenny McIntosh 4-yard run (Jack Podlesny kick), 11:44

Passing leaders

- Florida – Anthony Richardson – 18/37, 271 yards, 1 touchdown
- Georgia – Stetson Bennett – 19/38, 316 yards, 2 touchdowns, 2 interceptions

Rushing leaders

- Florida – Trevor Etienne – 11 carries, 53 yards, 1 touchdown
- Georgia – Daijun Edwards – 12 carries, 106 yards, 2 touchdowns

Receiving leaders

- Florida – Xzavier Henderson – 5 receptions, 110 yards, 1 touchdown
- Georgia – Brock Bowers – 5 receptions, 154 yards, 1 touchdown

Tackling leaders

- Florida – Rashad Torrance – 11 tackles
- Georgia – Javon Bullard – 8 tackles

=== Texas A&M ===
Florida Gators (4–4) at Texas A&M Aggies (3–5) – Game summary

Quarter	1	2	3	4	Total
Florida	17	3	14	7	41
Texas A&M	14	10	0	0	24

at Kyle Field • College Station, TX

- Date: November 5, 2022
- Game time: 11:00 a.m. CDT
- Game weather: Temperature: 57 °F (14 °C) • Wind: E at 5 miles per hour (8.0 km/h) • Weather: Sunny
- Game attendance: 97,797
- Referee: James Carter
- TV announcers (ESPN): Mark Jones (play-by-play), Robert Griffin III (color), Quint Kessenich (sideline reporter)
- Boxscore

Game information

First quarter

- Florida – Adam Mihalek 50-yard field goal, 10:41
- Texas A&M – De'Von Achane 5-yard run (Randy Bond kick), 9:21
- Florida – Anthony Richardson 10-yard run (Adam Mihalek kick), 6:01
- Texas A&M – De'Von Achane 5-yard pass from Haynes King (Randy Bond kick), 1:47
- Florida – Anthony Richardson 60-yard run (Adam Mihalek kick), 0:33

Second quarter

- Texas A&M – Randy Bond 24-yard field goal, 11:58
- Florida – Adam Mihalek 24-yard field goal, 4:49
- Texas A&M – De'Von Achane 2-yard run (Randy Bond kick), 1:00

Third quarter

- Florida – Ja'Quavion Fraziers 19-yard pass from Anthony Richardson (Adam Mihalek kick), 13:32
- Florida – Caleb Douglas 12-yard pass from Anthony Richardson (Adam Mihalek kick), 3:58

Fourth quarter

- Florida – Montrell Johnson Jr. 5-yard run (Adam Mihalek kick), 1:21

Passing leaders

- Florida – Anthony Richardson – 17/28, 201 yards, 2 touchdowns
- Texas A&M – Haynes King – 23/45 – 279 yards, 1 touchdown

Rushing leaders

- Florida – Montrell Johnson Jr. – 22 carries, 100 yards, 1 touchdown
- Texas A&M – De'Von Achane – 16 carries, 122 yards, 2 touchdowns

Receiving leaders

- Florida – Ricky Pearsall – 3 receptions, 65 yards
- Texas A&M – Evan Stewart – 8 receptions, 120 yards

Tackling leaders

- Florida – Trey Dean – 7 tackles
- Texas A&M – Jacoby Matthews – 15 tackles

=== South Carolina ===
South Carolina Gamecocks (6–3) at Florida Gators (5–4) – Game summary

Quarter	1	2	3	4	Total
South Carolina	0	6	0	0	6
Florida	21	3	7	7	38

at Ben Hill Griffin Stadium • Gainesville, FL

- Date: November 12, 2022
- Game time: 4:00 p.m. EST
- Game weather: Sunny
- Game attendance: 89,454
- Referee: Lee Hedrick
- TV announcers (SECN): Taylor Zarzour (play-by-play), Matt Stinchcomb (color), Alyssa Lang (sideline reporter)
- Boxscore

Game information

First quarter

- Florida – Anthony Richardson 3-yard run (Adam Mihalek kick), 9:17
- Florida – Ricky Pearsall 15-yard pass from Anthony Richardson (Adam Mihalek kick), 4:31
- Florida – Trevor Etienne 85-yard run (Adam Mihalek kick), 1:59

Second quarter

- Florida – Adam Mihalek 28-yard field goal, 6:24
- South Carolina – Dakereon Joyner 48-yard pass from Kai Kroeger, 1:52

Third quarter

- Florida – Jonathan Odom 4-yard pass from Anthony Richardson (Adam Mihalek kick), 9:43

Fourth quarter

- Florida – Montrell Johnson Jr. 8-yard run (Adam Mihalek kick), 6:02

Passing leaders

- South Carolina – Spencer Rattler – 18/26, 145 yards
- Florida – Anthony Richardson – 11/23, 112 yards, 2 touchdowns

Rushing leaders

- South Carolina – Jaheim Bell – 12 carries, 30 yards
- Florida – Montrell Johnson Jr. – 24 carries, 161 yards, 1 touchdown

Receiving leaders

- South Carolina – Dakereon Joyner – 2 receptions, 73 yards, 1 touchdown
- Florida – Caleb Douglas – 3 receptions, 53 yards

Tackling leaders

- South Carolina – Sherrod Greene – 10 tackles
- Florida – Amari Burney and Ventrell Miller – 4 tackles

=== Vanderbilt ===
Florida Gators (6–4) at Vanderbilt Commodores (4–6) – Game summary

Quarter	1	2	3	4	Total
Florida	3	3	6	12	24
Vanderbilt	0	14	14	3	31

at FirstBank Stadium • Nashville, TN

- Date: November 19, 2022
- Game time: 11:00 a.m. CST
- Game weather: Temperature: 38 °F (3 °C) • Wind: W at 8 miles per hour (13 km/h) • Weather: Sunny
- Game attendance: 30,136
- Referee: Steve Marlowe
- TV announcers (SECN): Taylor Zarzour (play-by-play), Matt Stinchcomb (color), Alyssa Lang (sideline reporter)
- Boxscore

Game information

First quarter

- Florida – Adam Mihalek 26-yard field goal, 8:21

Second quarter

- Vanderbilt – Jayden McGowan 10-yard pass from Mike Wright (Joseph Bulovas kick), 11:04
- Florida – Adam Mihalek 44-yard field goal, 4:38
- Vanderbilt – Wesley Schelling 0-yard fumble recovery (Joseph Bulovas kick), 3:22

Third quarter

- Florida – Montrell Johnson Jr 3-yard pass from Anthony Richardson, 10:17
- Vanderbilt – Gavin Schoenwald 7-yard pass from Mike Wright (Joseph Bulovas kick), 3:23
- Vanderbilt – Ben Bresnahan 28-yard pass from Mike Wright (Joseph Bulovas kick), 2:06

Fourth quarter

- Florida – Daejon Reynolds 74-yard pass from Anthony Richardson, 12:03
- Vanderbilt – Joseph Bulovas 27-yard field goal, 4:38
- Florida – Daejon Reynolds 16-yard pass from Anthony Richardson, 3:13

Passing leaders

- Florida – Anthony Richardson – 25/42, 400 yards, 3 touchdowns, 1 interception
- Vanderbilt – Mike Wright – 10/16, 108 yards, 3 touchdowns, 1 interception

Rushing leaders

- Florida – Montrell Johnson Jr. – 11 carries, 32 yards
- Vanderbilt – Ray Davis – 30 carries, 122 yards

Receiving leaders

- Florida – Daejon Reynolds – 8 receptions, 165 yards, 2 touchdowns
- Vanderbilt – Jayden McGowan – 3 receptions, 23 yards, 1 touchdown

Tackling leaders

- Florida – Ventrell Miller – 11 tackles
- Vanderbilt – CJ Taylor – 10 tackles

=== No. 16 Florida State ===
Florida Gators (6–5) at No. 16 Florida State Seminoles (8–3) – Game summary

Quarter	1	2	3	4	Total
Florida	14	10	0	14	38
No. 16 Florida State	14	7	17	7	45

at Doak Campbell Stadium • Tallahassee, FL

- Date: November 25, 2022
- Game time: 7:30 p.m. EST
- Game weather: Temperature: 69 °F (21 °C) • Wind: S at 8 miles per hour (13 km/h) • Weather: Cloudy
- Game attendance: 79,560
- Referee: James Carter
- TV announcers (ABC): Anish Shroff (play-by-play), Brock Osweiler (color), Taylor McGregor (sideline reporter)
- Boxscore

Game information

First quarter

- Florida State – Trey Benson 9-yard run (Ryan Fitzgerald kick), 11:30
- Florida – Ricky Pearsall 52-yard pass from Anthony Richardson (Adam Mihalek kick), 11:14
- Florida – Jonathan Odom 12-yard pass from Anthony Richardson (Adam Mihalek kick), 4:06
- Florida State – Jordan Travis 29-yard run (Ryan Fitzgerald kick), 1:28

Second quarter

- Florida – Ricky Pearsall 43-yard pass from Anthony Richardson (Adam Mihalek kick), 9:25
- Florida State – Jordan Travis 1 yard run (Ryan Fitzgerald kick), 5:44
- Florida – Adam Mihalek 41-yard field goal, 0:42

Third quarter

- Florida State – Ryan Fitzgerald 46-yard field goal, 8:53
- Florida State – Trey Benson 1 yard run (Ryan Fitzgerald kick), 4:21
- Florida State – Kentron Poitier 6-yard pass from Jordan Travis (Ryan Fitzgerald kick), 2:28

Fourth quarter

- Florida – Montrell Johnson Jr. 1 yard run (Adam Mihalek kick), 10:35
- Florida – Trevor Etienne 45-yard run (Adam Mihalek kick), 7:41
- Florida State – Trey Benson 17-yard run (Ryan Fitzgerald kick), 4:06

Passing leaders

- Florida – Anthony Richardson – 9/27, 198 yards, 3 touchdowns, 1 interception
- Florida State – Jordan Travis – 13/30, 270 yards, 1 touchdown

Rushing leaders

- Florida – Trevor Etienne – 17 carries, 129 yards, 1 touchdown
- Florida State – Trey Benson – 20 carries, 111 yards, 3 touchdowns

Receiving leaders

- Florida – Ricky Pearsall – 5 receptions, 148 yards, 3 touchdowns
- Florida State – Trey Benson – 2 receptions, 51 yards

Tackling leaders

- Florida – Trey Dean – 9 tackles
- Florida State – Tatum Bethune – 11 tackles

=== No. 14 Oregon State ===
Florida Gators (6–6) vs No. 14 Oregon State Beavers (9–3) – Game summary

Quarter	1	2	3	4	Total
Florida	0	0	0	3	3
No. 14 Oregon State	7	3	13	7	30

at Allegiant Stadium • Paradise, NV

- Date: December 17, 2022
- Game time: 11:30 a.m. PST
- Game weather: Indoors
- Game attendance: 29,750
- Referee: Riley Johnson
- TV announcers (ESPN): Dave Pasch (play-by-play), Kirk Herbstreit (color), Pat McAfee (analyst), Laura Rutledge (sideline reporter)

Game information

First quarter

- Oregon State – Tyjon Lindsey 11-yard run (Everett Hayes kick), 2:10

Second quarter

- Oregon State – Everett Hayes 27-yard field goal, 4:32

Third quarter

- Oregon State – Silas Bolden 15-yard pass from Ben Gulbranson (Everett Hayes kick), 10:20
- Oregon State – Ben Gulbranson 7-yard run, 8:44

Fourth quarter

- Oregon State – Jam Griffin 2-yard run (Atticus Sappington kick), 13:02
- Florida – Adam Mihalek 40-yard field goal, 0:37

Passing leaders

- Florida – Jack Miller – 13/22, 180 yards
- Oregon State – Ben Gulbranson – 12/19, 165 yards, 1 touchdown

Rushing leaders

- Florida – Montrell Johnson Jr. – 11 carries, 14 yards; Trevor Etienne – 8 carries, 14 yards
- Oregon State – Deshaun Fenwick – 21 carries, 107 yards

Receiving leaders

- Florida – Ricky Pearsall – 4 receptions, 65 yards
- Oregon State – Silas Bolden – 6 receptions, 99 yards, 1 touchdown

Tackling leaders

- Florida – Amari Burney, Rashad Torrence II, Derek Wingo – 8 tackles
- Oregon State – Kyrei Fisher-Morris – 11 tackles

== Personnel ==
=== Roster ===
As of December 2, 2022

2022 Florida Gators Roster
Quarterbacks: 10 Jack Miller III – (redshirt) Freshman; 13 Kyle Engel – (redshirt) Sophomore; 15 Anthony Richardson – Sophomore; 17 Max Brown – Freshman; 18 Jack Anders – (redshirt) Sophomore; Running backs: 2 Montrell Johnson Jr. – Sophomore; 5 Nay'Quan Wright – (redshirt) Sophomore; 7 Trevor Etienne – Freshman; 21 Lorenzo Lingard – (redshirt) Junior; 29 Isaac Ricks – (redshirt) Senior; 36 Corneilus Barnes – (redshirt) Freshman; 38 Carlson Joseph – (redshirt) Freshman; 40 Gabriel Ortiz – Freshman; 45 Eddie Battle – (redshirt) Senior; Wide receivers: 0 Ja'Quavion Fraziars – Sophomore; 1 Ricky Pearsall – Junior; 3 Xzavier Henderson – Sophomore; 4 Justin Shorter – (redshirt) Junior; 8 Daejon Reynolds – Sophomore; 12 Caleb Douglas – Freshman; 14 Trent Whittemore – (redshirt) Sophomore; 16 Thai Chiaokhiao-Bowman – Sophomore; 19 Alex Gonzalez – Freshman; 22 Kahleil Jackson – (redshirt) Freshman; 30 Taylor Spierto – (redshirt) Freshman; 33 Daniel Cross – (redshirt) Junior; 35 William Sawyer – (redshirt) Sophomore; 41 Justin Curtis – Senior; 80 Zak Sedaros – Freshman; 82 Ja'Markis Weston – (redshirt) Sophomore; 86 Jordan Pouncey – (redshirt) Senior; 88 Marcus Burke – (redshirt) Freshman; Tight ends: 9 Keon Zipperer – Junior; 18 Dante Zanders – (redshirt) Junior; 48 Noah Keeter – (redshirt) Sophomore; 81 Arlis Boardingham – Freshman; 84 Nick Elksnis – (redshirt) Freshman; 85 Scott Isacks III – Freshman; 87 Jonathan Odom – Sophomore; 89 Hayden Hansen – Freshman; 97 Griffin McDowell – (redshirt) Junior; Offensive line: 52 Jalen Farmer – Freshman; 54 O'Cyrus Torrence – Junior; 56 Christian Williams – Freshman; 57 David Conner – Freshman; 58 Austin Barber – (redshirt) Freshman; 59 Hayden Clem – (redshirt) Freshman; 60 Jackson Crozier – Freshman; 61 Nicolas Flynn – Freshman; 64 Riley Simonds – (redshirt) Sophomore; 65 Kingsley Eguakun – (redshirt) Sophomore; 66 Jake Slaughter – (redshirt) Freshman; 67 Richie Leonard – Sophomore; 70 Michael Tarquin – (redshirt) Sophomore; 72 Josh Braun – Sophomore; 73 Mark Pitts – (redshirt) Freshman; 74 Will Harrod – (redshirt) Sophomore; 75 Kamryn Waites – (redshirt) Freshman; 76 Richard Gouraige – (redshirt) Junior; 77 Ethan White – Junior; 78 Yousef Mugharbil – (redshirt) Freshman; 79 Jordan Herman – Sophomore	Defensive line: 7 Chris McClellan – Freshman; 9 Gervon Dexter Sr. – Sophomore; 12 Justus Boone – (redshirt) Freshman; 21 Desmond Watson – Sophomore; 33 Princely Umanmielen – Sophomore; 66 Jaelin Humphries – (redshirt) Sophomore; 90 Chris Thomas Jr. – (redshirt) Freshman; 92 Jalen Lee – Sophomore; 93 Keenan Landry – Sophomore; 94 Tyreak Sapp – (redshirt) Freshman; 95 Jamari Lyons – Freshman; 98 TJ Murphy – Freshman; Outside linebackers: 1 Brenton Cox Jr. – (redshirt) Junior; 4 David Reese – (redshirt) Junior; 14 Chief Borders – (redshirt) Freshman; 34 Andrew Savaiinaea – Freshman; 36 Bryce Capers – Freshman; 44 Jack Pyburn – Freshman; 52 Antwaun Powell-Ryland Jr. – Sophomore; 99 Lloyd Summerall III – (redshirt) Sophomore; Inside linebackers: 2 Amari Burney – Senior; 6 Shemar James – Freshman; 15 Derek Wingo – Sophomore; 17 Scooby Williams – (redshirt) Freshman; 30 Diwun Black – Junior; 42 Kenny Anyaehie – (redshirt) Junior; 47 Justin Pelic – (redshirt) Sophomore; 51 Ventrell Miller – (redshirt) Senior; Cornerbacks: 3 Jason Marshall Jr. – Sophomore; 8 Jalen Kimber – (redshirt) Sophomore; 11 Jordan Young – (redshirt) Freshman; 23 Jaydon Hill – (redshirt) Sophomore; 24 Avery Helm – Sophomore; 25 Ethan Pouncey – Sophomore; 28 Devin Moore – Freshman; Safeties: 0 Trey Dean – Senior; 5 Kamari Wilson – Freshman; 10 Miguel Mitchell – Freshman; 13 Donovan McMillon – Sophomore; 16 Tre'Vez Johnson – Sophomore; 20 Corey Collier Jr. – (redshirt) Freshman; 22 Rashad Torrence II – Sophomore; 26 Kamar Wilcoxson – (redshirt) Freshman; 27 Jadarrius Perkins – Junior; 31 Cruz Rushing – Freshman; 35 Dakota Mitchell – (redshirt) Freshman; 37 Javion Toombs – Freshman; 38 Cahron Rackley – (redshirt) Freshman	Kickers: 29 Trey Smack – Freshman; 49 Adam Mihalek – (redshirt) Freshman; 96 Travis Freeman – (redshirt) Sophomore; Punters: 26 Jeremy Crawshaw – Sophomore; 37 Tyler Waxman – (redshirt) Sophomore; 40 Jacob Watkins – (redshirt) Senior; 46 Jack Brady – (redshirt) Sophomore; Long snappers: 42 Rocco Underwood – (redshirt) Freshman; 45 Marco Ortiz – (redshirt) Junior; 53 Chase Whitfield – (redshirt) Sophomore
Redshirt | Injury

=== Coaching staff ===
Name	Position	Joined staff
Billy Napier	Head coach	2022
Rob Sale	Offensive coordinator / offensive line	2022
Patrick Toney	Co-Defensive coordinator / Safeties	2022
Sean Spencer	Co-defensive coordinator / Defensive line	2022
Jabbar Juluke	Associate head coach (Offense) / Running backs	2022
Corey Raymond	Assistant head coach (Defense) / Cornerbacks	2022
Keary Colbert	Wide Receivers	2022
Darnell Stapleton	Offensive line	2022
William Peagler	Tight ends	2022
Mike Peterson	Outside Linebackers	2022
Jay Bateman	Inside Linebackers	2022
Mark Hocke	Associate head coach / Director of strength and conditioning	2022
Russ Callaway	Defensive intern	2022

== Players drafted into the NFL ==
Round	Pick	Player	Position	NFL Club
1	4	Anthony Richardson	QB	Indianapolis Colts
2	53	Gervon Dexter	DT	Chicago Bears
2	59	O'Cyrus Torrence	OG	Buffalo Bills
4	121	Ventrell Miller	ILB	Jacksonville Jaguars
5	150	Justin Shorter	WR	Buffalo Bills
6	203	Amari Burney	LB	Las Vegas Raiders
