= Javontez Spraggins =

American football player (born 2002)

Reyes de Jalisco
- Position: Offensive lineman

Personal information
- Born: May 20, 2002 (age 24)
- Listed height: 6 ft 2 in (1.88 m)
- Listed weight: 306 lb (139 kg)

Career information
- High school: East St. Louis (East St. Louis, Illinois)
- College: Tennessee (2020–2024)
- NFL draft: 2025: undrafted

Career history
- Reyes de Jalisco (2026–present)
- Stats at ESPN

Javontez Armid Spraggins (born May 20, 2002) is an American professional football offensive lineman for the Reyes de Jalisco of the Liga de Fútbol Americano Profesional (LFA). He played college football for the Tennessee Volunteers.

== High school career ==
Spraggins attended East St. Louis Senior High School in East St. Louis, Illinois. A three-star recruit, Spraggins committed to play college football at the University of Tennessee over offers from Illinois, Missouri, and Iowa State.

== College career ==
As a freshman in 2020, Spraggins appeared in eight games, allowing no sacks, before finishing third on the team for most snaps played the following season. During the 2022 season, after a game where he allowed zero sacks and played every offensive down, Spraggins was named the SEC Offensive Lineman of the Week. Entering the 2023 season, Spraggins was seen as a top offensive line prospect in the upcoming 2024 NFL draft.

== Professional career ==
Pre-draft measurables
Height	Weight	Arm length	Hand span	40-yard dash	10-yard split	20-yard split	20-yard shuttle	Three-cone drill	Vertical jump	Broad jump	Bench press
6 ft 1 7/8 in (1.88 m)	306 lb (139 kg)	32 3/8 in (0.82 m)	9 3/4 in (0.25 m)	5.18 s	1.84 s	3.03 s	4.91 s	7.94 s	26.0 in (0.66 m)	8 ft 4 in (2.54 m)	27 reps
All values from Pro Day

Spraggins went undrafted in the 2025 NFL draft. In 2026, he played for the Reyes de Jalisco of the Liga de Fútbol Americano Profesional (LFA).

== Personal life ==
Spraggins is known for celebrating with stuffed animals of the opposing team's mascot after victories. Spraggins was named to the 2021 SEC Academic Honor Roll.
