= Joey Halzle =

American football coach

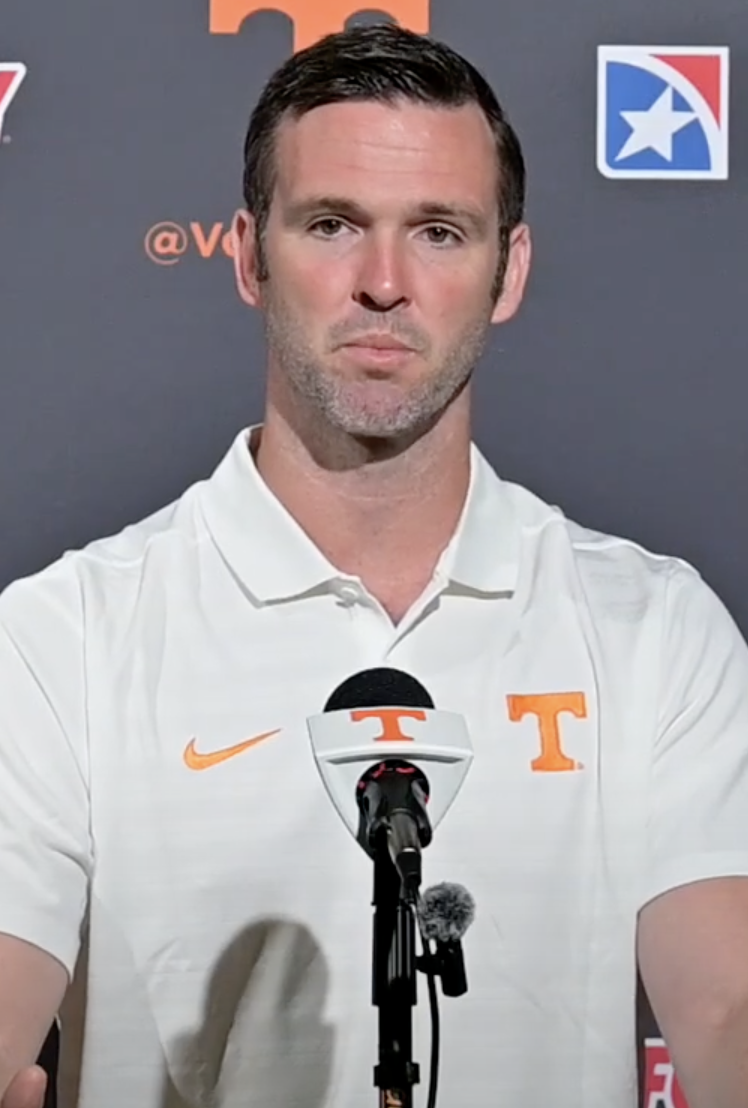
- Halzle in 2024

Current position
- Title: Offensive coordinator
- Team: Tennessee
- Conference: SEC

Biographical details
- Born: January 29, 1986 (age 40)
- Education: Oklahoma (2008)

Playing career
- 2006–2008: Oklahoma
- Position: Quarterback

Coaching career (HC unless noted)
- 2009–2011: Oklahoma (QC)
- 2012–2014: Oklahoma (GA)
- 2015: Utah State (OA/asst. QB)
- 2016: Missouri (OA/asst.QB)
- 2019: UCF (OA/asst.QB)
- 2020: UCF (QB)
- 2021–2022: Tennessee (QB)
- 2023–present: Tennessee (OC/QB)

Joey Halzle (born January 29, 1986) is an American football coach and former player who is currently the offensive coordinator at the University of Tennessee.

== Early life ==
Halzle grew up in Oak Park, California and attended Oaks Christian High School. He committed to play college football at Oklahoma.

== College career ==
In his three years at Oklahoma, he played in 21 games, completing 53 of his 83 passes for 640 yards and four touchdowns with two interceptions.

== Coaching career ==
Halzle spent the first five years at Oklahoma as a quality control coach and a graduate assistant. From there he would become Utah State's assistant QB coach for one year. From there he moved on to Missouri for one year as their assistant QB Coach. He returned to coaching in 2019, spending one year at UCF as an offensive assistant. In the following season, UCF promoted Halzle to be their QB coach. As the QB coach for UCF, he helped quarterback Dillon Gabriel have a stellar year, completing 248 of his 413 passes for 3570 yards and 32 touchdowns, with only four interceptions. After his stint with UCF, he would be hired as the QB Coach at Tennessee, following head coach Josh Heupel. After coaching the QB position for two years, including helping Hendon Hooker enjoy a breakout year in 2022, and after he helped Tennessee win the 2022 Orange Bowl, Halzle was promoted to be Tennessee's offensive coordinator for the 2023 season.
