= Bryson Eason =

American football player (born 2002)

No. 94 – Kansas City Chiefs
- Position: Defensive tackle
- Roster status: Active

Personal information
- Born: January 21, 2002 (age 24)
- Listed height: 6 ft 3 in (1.91 m)
- Listed weight: 315 lb (143 kg)

Career information
- High school: Whitehaven (Memphis, Tennessee)
- College: Tennessee (2020–2025)
- NFL draft: 2026: undrafted

Career history
- San Francisco 49ers (2026)*; Kansas City Chiefs (2026–present)
- * Offseason or practice squad member only

Career NFL statistics as of Week 7, 2026
- Total tackles: 2
- Stats at Pro Football Reference

Bryson Lee Eason (born January 21, 2002) is an American professional football defensive tackle for the Kansas City Chiefs of the National Football League (NFL). He played college football for Tennessee Volunteers.

== Early life ==
Eason is from Memphis, Tennessee. He grew up playing football attended Whitehaven High School in Memphis where he played as a linebacker. As a junior, he helped Whitehaven to an appearance in the Class 6A state championship game. He was all-state as a sophomore in 2017 and as a senior in 2019. A four-star recruit and one of the top-350 prospects nationally, Eason committed to play college football for the Tennessee Volunteers. He and two of his linebacker teammates at Whitehaven each committed to the Volunteers on the same day.

== College career ==
Eason appeared mainly on special teams in six games as a true freshman in 2020, then redshirted in 2021 after appearing in three games and posting a tackle-for-loss (TFL). He became a defensive tackle in 2022 and tallied 18 tackles, 3.5 TFLs and 1.5 sacks. In 2023, he started seven games and recorded 27 tackles, five TFLs and 1.5 sacks. He then had 25 tackles, seven TFLs and 1.5 sacks during the 2024 season, in which he started all 13 games. Eason opted to return for a sixth and final season in 2025. Entering 2025, he was one of only two scholarship players who had been with Tennessee since before the hiring of head coach Josh Heupel. He was invited to the 2026 Senior Bowl.

== Professional career ==
Pre-draft measurables
Height	Weight	Arm length	Hand span	Wingspan	40-yard dash	10-yard split	20-yard split	20-yard shuttle	Vertical jump	Broad jump	Bench press
6 ft 2 1/8 in (1.88 m)	323 lb (147 kg)	33 1/8 in (0.84 m)	10 in (0.25 m)	6 ft 6 3/4 in (2.00 m)	5.09 s	1.80 s	2.95 s	4.76 s	30.5 in (0.77 m)	9 ft 4 in (2.84 m)	22 reps
All values from NFL Combine/Pro Day

=== San Francisco 49ers ===
Eason signed with the San Francisco 49ers as an undrafted free agent on April 26, 2026. On August 30, he was waived by San Francisco as a part of final roster cuts.

=== Kansas City Chiefs ===
On August 31, 2026, Eason was claimed off waivers by the Kansas City Chiefs.
