= Will Brooks (American football) =

American football player (born 2001)

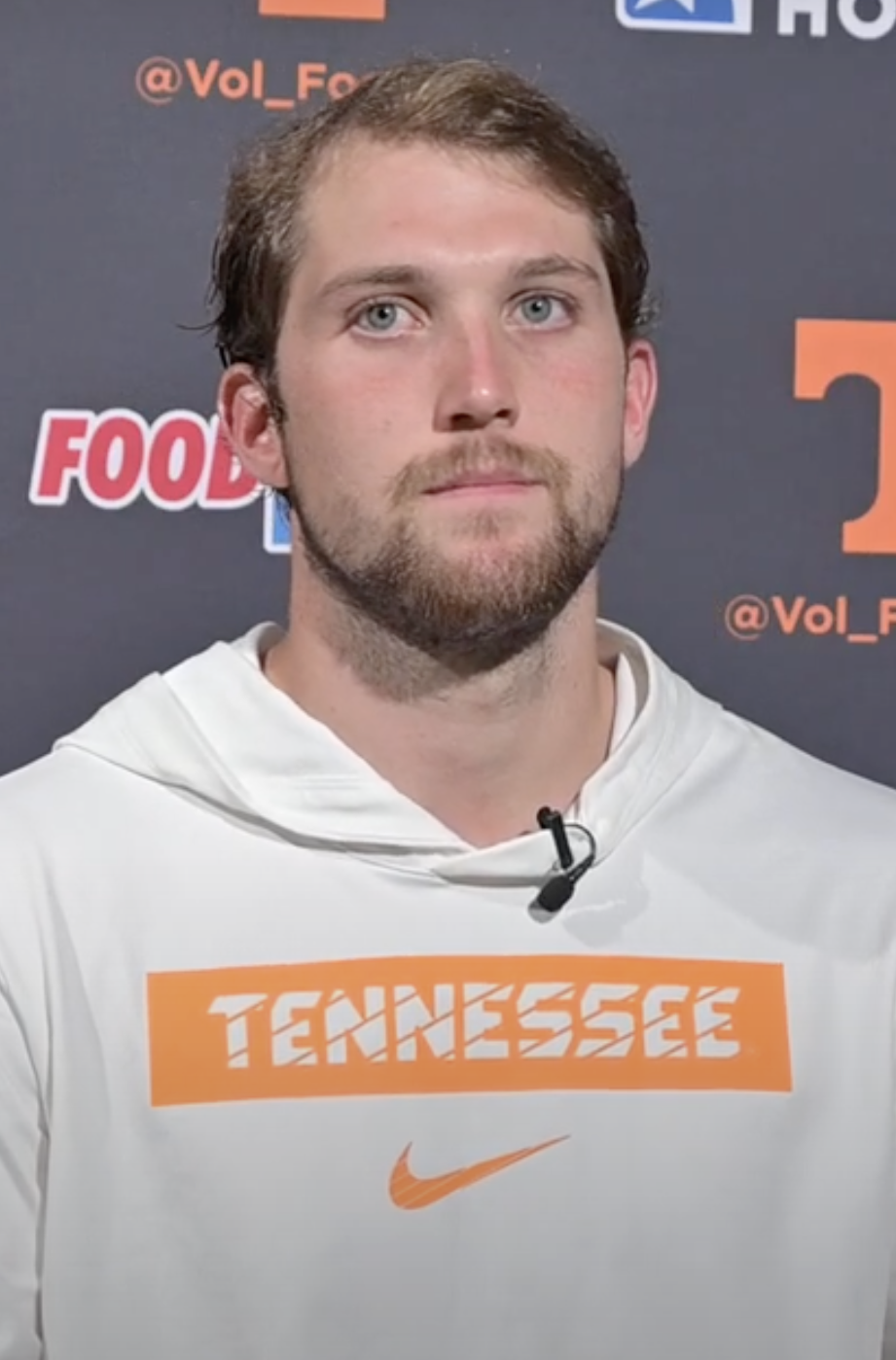
- Brooks with Tennessee in 2024

Profile
- Position: Safety

Personal information
- Born: October 25, 2001 (age 25); Birmingham, Alabama, U.S.
- Listed height: 6 ft 1 in (1.85 m)
- Listed weight: 203 lb (92 kg)

Career information
- High school: Vestavia Hills (Vestavia Hills, Alabama)
- College: Tennessee (2020–2024)
- NFL draft: 2025: undrafted

Career history
- Kansas City Chiefs (2025)*; Tampa Bay Buccaneers (2025)*
- * Offseason or practice squad member only

Robert William Brooks (born October 25, 2001) is an American professional football safety. He played college football for the Tennessee Volunteers.

== Early life ==
Brooks attended Vestavia Hills High School in Vestavia Hills, Alabama, and joined the Tennessee Volunteers football team as a walk-on.

== College career ==
In Brooks's first four collegiate seasons from 2020 to 2023, he appeared in 39 games, where he notched 23 tackles with one being for a loss, and a pass deflection. In week 2 of the 2024 season, he returned an interception 85 yards for a touchdown in a win over NC State. In week 8, Brooks notched eight tackles with one being for a loss, and the game sealing interception, as he helped Tennessee upset rival Alabama. For his performance, Brooks was named the Walk-On of the Week.

== Professional career ==
Pre-draft measurables
Height	Weight	Arm length	Hand span	Wingspan	40-yard dash	10-yard split	20-yard split	20-yard shuttle	Three-cone drill	Vertical jump	Broad jump	Bench press
6 ft 0 7/8 in (1.85 m)	203 lb (92 kg)	30 1/8 in (0.77 m)	8 7/8 in (0.23 m)	6 ft 0 5/8 in (1.84 m)	4.60 s	1.53 s	2.65 s	4.33 s	6.98 s	37.0 in (0.94 m)	10 ft 5 in (3.18 m)	10 reps
All values from Pro Day

=== Kansas City Chiefs ===
Brooks signed with the Kansas City Chiefs as an undrafted free agent on May 3, 2025. He was waived just three days later.

=== Tampa Bay Buccaneers ===
On August 18, 2025, Brooks signed with the Tampa Bay Buccaneers. He was waived on August 26 as part of final roster cuts.
