= Elijah Herring =

American football player (born 2003)

No. 31 – Florida State Seminoles
- Position: Linebacker
- Class: Senior

Personal information
- Born: May 29, 2003 (age 23)
- Listed height: 6 ft 2 in (1.88 m)
- Listed weight: 217 lb (98 kg)

Career information
- High school: Riverdale (Murfreesboro, Tennessee)
- College: Tennessee (2022–2023); Memphis (2024); Florida State (2025)
- Stats at ESPN

Elijah David Herring (born May 29, 2003) is an American college football linebacker for the Florida State Seminoles. He previously played for the Tennessee Volunteers and the Memphis Tigers.

== Early life ==
Herring attended Riverdale High School in Murfreesboro, Tennessee, where he recorded 77 tackles with 16 being for a loss, and five sacks as a senior. He was rated as a three-star recruit and committed to play college football for the Tennessee Volunteers.

== College career ==
=== Tennessee ===
In week 3 of the 2022 season, Herring notched three tackles and two sacks against Akron. As a freshman, he played in all 13 games, tallying 11 tackles with two and a half being for a loss, and two sacks. Herring made his first career start in week 2 of the 2023 season where he played 51 snaps making four tackles, as he helped the Volunteers to a 30–13 win over Austin Peay. In 2023, he played in 13 games making 12 starts where he notched 80 tackles with four being for a loss, and a pass deflection. After the season, Herring entered his name into the NCAA transfer portal.

=== Memphis ===
Herring transferred to play for the Memphis Tigers.

On December 19, 2024, Herring announced that he would enter the transfer portal for the second time.

=== Florida State ===
On January 5, 2025, Herring announced that he would transfer to Florida State.

== Professional career ==
Pre-draft measurables
Height	Weight	Arm length	Hand span	Wingspan	40-yard dash	10-yard split	20-yard split	20-yard shuttle	Three-cone drill	Vertical jump	Broad jump	Bench press
6 ft 2 1/8 in (1.88 m)	217 lb (98 kg)	32 1/4 in (0.82 m)	10 in (0.25 m)	6 ft 7 1/2 in (2.02 m)	4.99 s	1.69 s	2.72 s	4.53 s	7.10 s	30.5 in (0.77 m)	9 ft 5 in (2.87 m)	12 reps
All values from Pro Day
