= Kamal Hadden =

American football player (born 2001)

No. 36 – Green Bay Packers
- Position: Cornerback
- Roster status: Active

Personal information
- Born: January 17, 2001 (age 25); River Rouge, Michigan, U.S.
- Listed height: 6 ft 1 in (1.85 m)
- Listed weight: 192 lb (87 kg)

Career information
- High school: River Rouge
- College: Independence CC (2019–2020); Tennessee (2021–2023)
- NFL draft: 2024: 6th round, 211th overall pick

Career history
- Kansas City Chiefs (2024)*; Green Bay Packers (2024–present)
- * Offseason or practice squad member only

Career NFL statistics as of Week 10, 2026
- Total tackles: 18
- Stats at Pro Football Reference

Kamal Hadden (born January 17, 2001) is an American professional football cornerback for the Green Bay Packers of the National Football League (NFL). He played college football for the Tennessee Volunteers. He was selected by the Chiefs in the sixth round of the 2024 NFL draft.

== Early life and college ==
Hadden attended River Rouge High School in River Rouge, Michigan.

Hadden attended Independence Community College out of high school. In his first year in 2019, he had 21 tackles and one interception. He did not play in 2020 due to Independence not having games that season because of the COVID-19 pandemic.

Hadden originally transferred to Auburn University in December 2020, but re-entered the transfer portal and transferred to the University of Tennessee in June 2021. In his first year at Tennessee, he played in seven games with two starts and had 17 tackles and one interception. Hadden started six of nine games in 2022, recording 51 tackles and two interceptions. As a senior in 2023, he started the first seven games of the season before suffering a season-ending shoulder injury. He finished with 19 tackles, three interceptions and a touchdown, which was a pick-six against South Carolina. Hadden declared for the 2024 NFL draft after the season.

== Professional career ==
Pre-draft measurables
Height	Weight	Arm length	Hand span	Wingspan	40-yard dash	10-yard split	20-yard split	20-yard shuttle	Three-cone drill	Vertical jump	Broad jump
6 ft 1 in (1.85 m)	196 lb (89 kg)	30 7/8 in (0.78 m)	8 1/2 in (0.22 m)	6 ft 2 1/8 in (1.88 m)	4.59 s	1.51 s	2.55 s	4.31 s	7.15 s	34.5 in (0.88 m)	10 ft 2 in (3.10 m)
All values from NFL Combine/Pro Day

=== Kansas City Chiefs ===
Hadden was selected by the Kansas City Chiefs in the sixth round (211th overall) of the 2024 NFL draft. He was waived on August 27, 2024.

=== Green Bay Packers ===
Hadden was signed by the Green Bay Packers to their practice squad on August 30, 2024. He was elevated to the active roster for Week 4 in September and Week 9 in November 2024. Hadden signed a reserve/future contract with Green Bay on January 13, 2025.

Hadden made 10 appearances for the Packers in 2025, recording five total tackles prior to being carted off the field in Week 17 against the Baltimore Ravens. He was placed on injured reserve after being diagnosed with a season-ending ankle injury on December 30, 2025.

== NFL career statistics ==
Legend
**Bold**	Career high

=== Regular season ===
Year	Team	Games		Tackles					Interceptions						Fumbles	
Year	Team	GP	GS	Cmb	Solo	Ast	TFL	Sck	PD	Int	Yds	Avg	Lng	TD	FF	FR
2024	GB	2	0	0	0	0	0	0.0	0	0	0	0	0	0	0	0
2025	GB	10	0	**5**	**1**	**4**	0	0.0	0	0	0	0	0	0	0	0
Career		12	0	5	1	4	0	0.0	0	0	0	0	0	0	0	0
Source: pro-football-reference.com
