= Jaylen Wright =

American football player (born 2003)

No. 5 – Miami Dolphins
- Position: Running back
- Roster status: Active

Personal information
- Born: April 1, 2003 (age 23); Raleigh, North Carolina, U.S.
- Listed height: 5 ft 10 in (1.78 m)
- Listed weight: 205 lb (93 kg)

Career information
- High school: Southern Durham (Durham, North Carolina)
- College: Tennessee (2021–2023)
- NFL draft: 2024: 4th round, 120th overall pick

Career history
- Miami Dolphins (2024–present)

Awards and highlights
- Second-team All-SEC (2023)

Career NFL statistics as of 2025
- Rushing yards: 537
- Rushing average: 3.9
- Rushing touchdowns: 2
- Receptions: 8
- Receiving yards: 52
- Stats at Pro Football Reference

Jaylen Allen Wright (born April 1, 2003) is an American professional football running back for the Miami Dolphins of the National Football League (NFL). He played college football for the Tennessee Volunteers and was selected by the Dolphins in the fourth round of the 2024 NFL draft.

== Early life ==
Wright attended Southern School of Energy and Sustainability in Durham, North Carolina. As a junior in 2019, he rushed for 901 yards on 89 carries with five touchdowns. He did not play as a senior due to the season being cancelled because of the COVID-19 pandemic. Wright committed to the University of Tennessee to play college football.

== College career ==
As a true freshman at Tennessee in 2021, Wright played in nine games and had 85 rushes for 409 yards and four touchdowns. As a sophomore in 2022, he led Tennessee with 875 yards on 146 carries with 10 touchdowns. He returned to Tennessee for his junior year in 2023. In the 2023 season, he had 137 carries for 1,013 rushing yards and four rushing touchdowns in 12 games. He was named second team All-SEC for the 2023 season.

== Professional career ==
Pre-draft measurables
Height	Weight	Arm length	Hand span	Wingspan	40-yard dash	10-yard split	20-yard split	Vertical jump	Broad jump
5 ft 10 1/2 in (1.79 m)	210 lb (95 kg)	31 1/2 in (0.80 m)	9 3/8 in (0.24 m)	6 ft 3 7/8 in (1.93 m)	4.38 s	1.55 s	2.57 s	38.0 in (0.97 m)	11 ft 2 in (3.40 m)
All values from NFL Combine

Wright was selected by the Miami Dolphins in the fourth round with the 120th overall pick in the 2024 NFL draft. As a rookie, he appeared in 15 games. He finished with 68 carries for 249 yards.
