= Jenny Dell =

American college football reporter

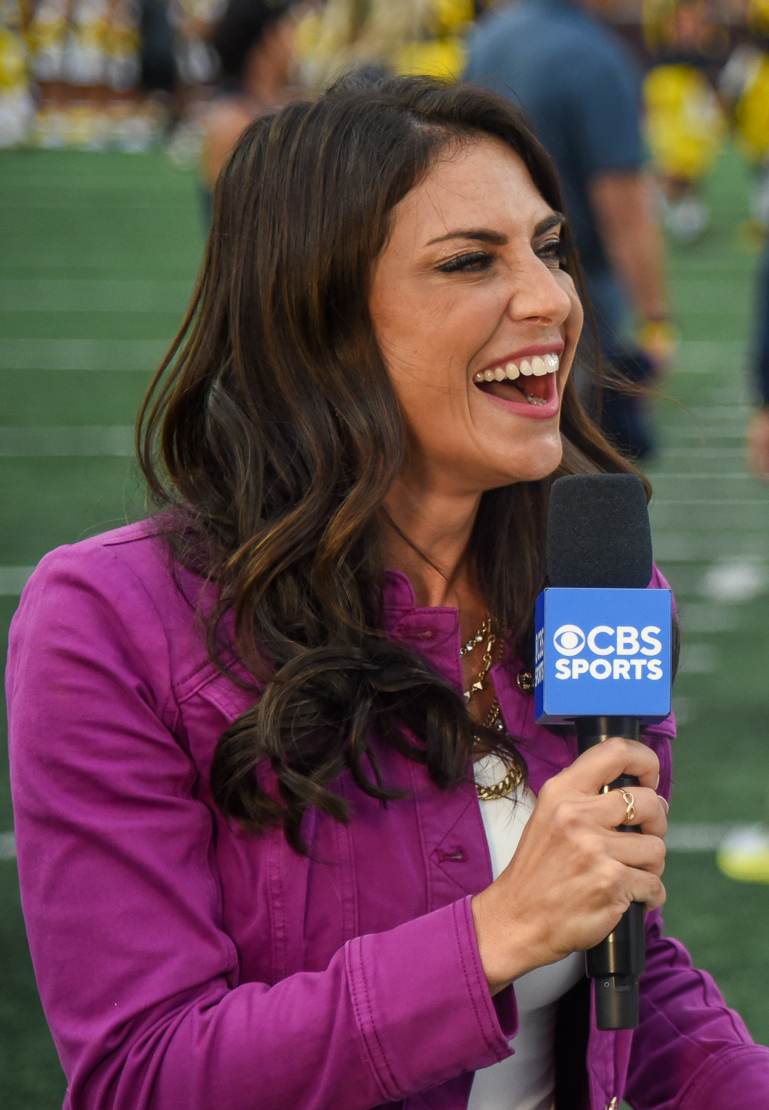
- Dell in 2023

Personal information
- Full name: Jennifer Dell Middlebrooks
- Nickname: Jenny Dell
- Born: Jennifer Sheryl Dell; July 26, 1986 (age 39) Southbury, Connecticut, U.S.
- Education: University of Massachusetts Amherst
- Occupation: Sports reporter
- Years active: 2008–present
- Employer: CBS Sports
- Spouse: Will Middlebrooks (m. 2016)
- Children: 2

Jennifer Sheryl Dell–Middlebrooks (born July 26, 1986) is the lead college football reporter for CBS Sports. Dell previously worked as CBS’ #2 NFL sideline reporter in 2014. She also has worked for New England Sports Network (NESN) covering the Boston Red Sox. Since 2016, she has also been the co-host of the food show Campus Eats alongside Troy Johnson on the Big Ten Network.

== Personal life ==
Dell grew up in Connecticut. She attended Pomperaug High School in Southbury. In 2008, she graduated from college at the University of Massachusetts Amherst with a Bachelor of Science degree in Sport Management and Hospitality and Tourism Management.

Late in 2012, Dell began dating Will Middlebrooks, at the time the third baseman for the Red Sox. They became engaged in July 2014. They were married in February 2016.

In October 2018, Dell and Middlebrooks had their first child, a daughter. A second daughter arrived a year later, in December 2019. Dell had struggled to get pregnant and used fertility treatments.
