= 2023 South Carolina Gamecocks football team =

American college football season

2023 South Carolina Gamecocks football
- Conference: Southeastern Conference
- Eastern Division
- Record: 5–7 (3–5 SEC)
- Head coach: Shane Beamer (3rd season)
- Offensive coordinator: Dowell Loggains (1st season)
- Offensive scheme: Multiple
- Defensive coordinator: Clayton White (3rd season)
- Base defense: 4–2–5
- Home stadium: Williams–Brice Stadium

Uniform
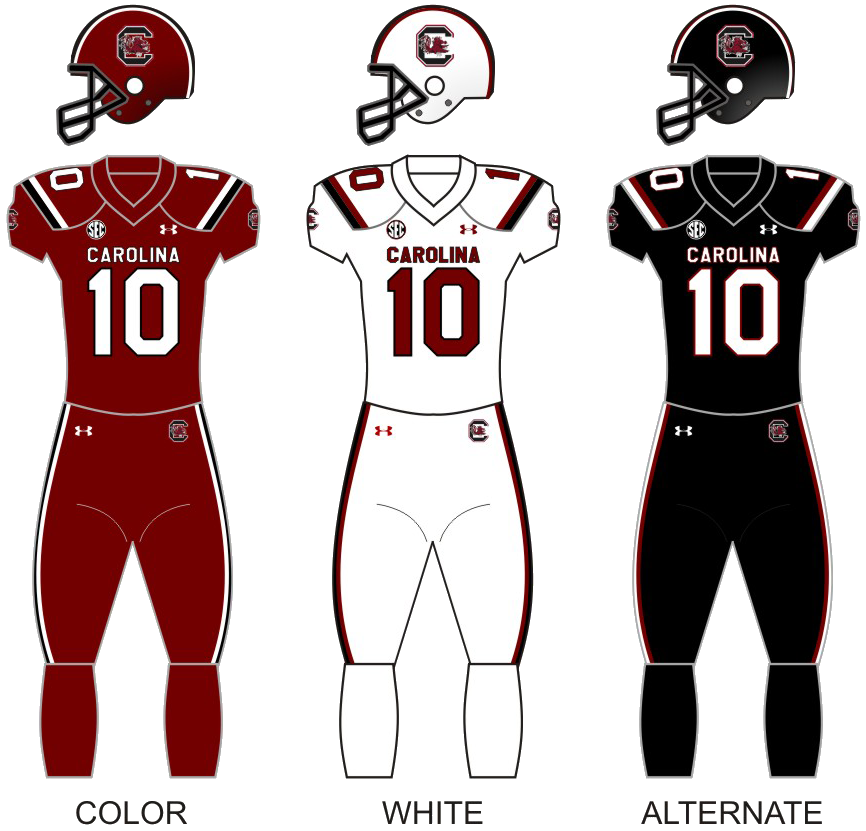

2023 Southeastern Conference football standings
	Conf.			Overall
Team	W		L	W		L
Eastern Division
No. 4 Georgia xy	8	–	0	13	–	1
No. 8 Missouri	6	–	2	11	–	2
No. 17 Tennessee	4	–	4	9	–	4
Kentucky	3	–	5	7	–	6
Florida	3	–	5	5	–	7
South Carolina	3	–	5	5	–	7
Vanderbilt	0	–	8	2	–	10
Western Division
No. 5 Alabama xy$^	8	–	0	12	–	2
No. 9 Ole Miss	6	–	2	11	–	2
No. 12 LSU	6	–	2	10	–	3
Texas A&M	4	–	4	7	–	6
Auburn	3	–	5	6	–	7
Mississippi State	1	–	7	5	–	7
Arkansas	1	–	7	4	–	8
Championship: Alabama 27, Georgia 24
^ – College Football Playoff participant; $ – Conference champion; x – Division champion/co-champions; y – Championship game participant; Rankings from AP Poll

The 2023 South Carolina Gamecocks football team represented the University of South Carolina as a member of the Eastern Division of the Southeastern Conference (SEC) during the 2023 NCAA Division I FBS football season. The Gamecocks played their home games at Williams–Brice Stadium in Columbia, South Carolina, and were led by Shane Beamer in his third year as their head coach.

This was also the final year for the East division, as Texas and Oklahoma joined the SEC in 2024.

Despite quarterback Spencer Rattler and wide receiver Xavier Legette having two of the best individual seasons in school history in their final college year, (Note: Sources:) the team was noted by the media for being heavily affected by injuries. South Carolina finished sixth in the final SEC East, with an overall record of 5–7, missing a bowl game for the first time since 2020.

== Schedule ==
Prior to the season, several sports websites named South Carolina as having the most difficult schedule in the country in 2023.

Date	Time	Opponent	Site	TV	Result	Attendance
September 2	7:30 p.m.	vs. No. 21 North Carolina*	Bank of America Stadium; Charlotte, NC (Duke's Mayo Classic, rivalry, College GameDay)	ABC	L 17–31	68,723
September 9	7:30 p.m.	No. 6 Furman* (FCS)	Williams–Brice Stadium; Columbia, SC	SECN+/ESPN+	W 47–21	78,281
September 16	3:30 p.m.	at No. 1 Georgia	Sanford Stadium; Athens, GA (rivalry)	CBS	L 14–24	92,746
September 23	7:30 p.m.	Mississippi State	Williams–Brice Stadium; Columbia, SC	SECN	W 37–30	78,311
September 30	7:30 p.m.	at No. 21 Tennessee	Neyland Stadium; Knoxville, TN (rivalry)	SECN	L 20–41	101,915
October 14	3:30 p.m.	Florida	Williams–Brice Stadium; Columbia, SC	SECN	L 39–41	79,247
October 21	3:30 p.m.	at No. 20 Missouri	Faurot Field; Columbia, MO (Mayor's Cup)	SECN	L 12–34	62,621
October 28	12:00 p.m.	at Texas A&M	Kyle Field; College Station, TX	ESPN	L 10–30	95,297
November 4	12:00 p.m.	Jacksonville State*	Williams–Brice Stadium; Columbia, SC	ESPNU	W 38–28	75,348
November 11	12:00 p.m.	Vanderbilt	Williams–Brice Stadium; Columbia, SC	SECN	W 47–6	75,682
November 18	7:30 p.m	Kentucky	Williams–Brice Stadium; Columbia, SC	SECN	W 17–14	77,788
November 25	7:30 p.m.	No. 24 Clemson*	Williams–Brice Stadium; Columbia, SC (Palmetto Bowl)	SECN	L 7–16	80,172
*Non-conference game; Rankings from AP Poll (and CFP Rankings, from the date when issued) – Released prior to game; All times are in Eastern time

== Game summaries ==
=== vs No. 21 North Carolina (Duke's Mayo Classic, rivalry) ===
Game One – No. 21 North Carolina Tar Heels (0–0) vs. South Carolina Gamecocks (0–0) – Game summary

Quarter	1	2	3	4	Total
No. 21 North Carolina	7	10	14	0	31
South Carolina	7	7	0	3	17

at Bank of America Stadium • Charlotte, North Carolina

- Date: Saturday, September 2, 2023
- Game time: 7:30 p.m. EST
- Game weather: Clear • 85 °F (29 °C) • Wind: NE 3 MPH
- Game attendance: 68,723
- Referee: Jeff Heaser
- TV announcers (ABC): Sean McDonough (play-by-play), Greg McElroy (color), Molly McGrath (sideline)

Game information

First quarter

- (9:50) UNC – Omarion Hampton 1-yard run (Ryan Coe kick) (Drive: 9 plays, 70 yards, 3:55; North Carolina 7–0)
- (6:29) SC – Dakereon Joyner 4-yard run (Mitch Jeter kick) (Drive: 8 plays, 75 yards, 3:21; Tied 7–7)

Second quarter

- (7:05) UNC – Ryan Coe 37-yard field goal (Drive: 13 plays, 42 yards, 6:20; North Carolina 10–7)
- (5:16) SC – Juju McDowell 1-yard run (Mitch Jeter kick) (Drive: 5 plays, 72 yards, 1:49; South Carolina 14–10)
- (2:50) UNC – Kobe Paysour 34-yard pass from Drake Maye (Ryan Coe kick) (Drive: 5 plays, 75 yards, 2:26; North Carolina 17–14)

Third quarter

- (11:35) UNC – Omarion Hampton 1-yard run (Ryan Coe kick) (Drive: 6 plays, 53 yards, 2:43; North Carolina 24–14)
- (6:29) UNC – John Copenhaver 18-yard pass from Drake Maye (Ryan Coe kick) (Drive: 8 plays, 55 yards, 3:25; North Carolina 31–14)

Fourth quarter

- (12:19) SC – Mitch Jeter 26-yard field goal (Drive: 12 plays, 61 yards, 4:55; North Carolina 31–17)

Statistics	UNC	SC
First downs	21	20
Total yards	71–437	70–351
Rushing yards	39–168	31– -2
Passing yards	269	353
Passing: Comp–Att–Int	24–32–2	30–39–0
Time of possession	32:37	27:23

Team	Category	Player	Statistics
North Carolina	Passing	Drake Maye	24/32, 269 yards, 2 TD, 2 INT
North Carolina	Rushing	British Brooks	15 carries, 103 yards
North Carolina	Receiving	Kobe Paysour	7 receptions, 66 yards, TD
South Carolina	Passing	Spencer Rattler	30/39, 353 yards
South Carolina	Rushing	Dakereon Joyner	12 carries, 23 yards, TD
South Carolina	Receiving	Xavier Legette	9 receptions, 178 yards

=== vs No. 6 Furman (FCS) ===
Game Two – No. 6 Furman Paladins (FCS) (1–0) at South Carolina Gamecocks (0–1) – Game summary

Quarter	1	2	3	4	Total
No. 6 Furman (FCS)	7	7	0	7	21
South Carolina	7	20	13	7	47

at Williams-Brice Stadium • Columbia, South Carolina

- Date: Saturday, September 9, 2023
- Game time: 7:30 p.m. EST
- Game weather: Sunny • 75 °F (24 °C) • Wind: SE 5 mph
- Game attendance: 78,281
- Referee: Kyle Olson
- TV announcers (SECN+/ESPN+): John Schriffen (play-by-play), Rocky Boiman (color), Dawn Davenport (Sideline)

Game information

First quarter

- (7:27) FU – Dominic Roberto 1-yard run (Axel Lepvreau kick) (Drive: 6 plays, 68 yards, 2:49; Furman 7–0)
- (4:59) SC – Dakereon Joyner 3-yard run (Mitch Jeter kick) (Drive: 7 plays, 72 yards, 2:21; Tied 7–7)

Second quarter

- (11:57) FU – Luke Shiflett 4-yard pass from Tyler Huff (Ian Williams kick) (Drive: 11 plays, 66 yards, 5:04; Furman 14–7)
- (8:26) SC – Spencer Rattler 1-yard run (Mitch Jeter kick) (Drive: 10 plays, 75 yards, 3:31; Tied 14–14)
- (0:43) SC – Luke Doty 36-yard pass from Spencer Rattler (pass failed) (Drive: 10 plays, 74 yards, 3:48; South Carolina 20–14)
- (0:03) SC – O'Mega Blake 3-yard pass from Spencer Rattler (Mitch Jeter kick) (Drive: 3 plays, 75 yards, 0:26; South Carolina 27–14)

Third quarter

- (8:36) SC – Xavier Legette 42-yard pass from Spencer Rattler (Mitch Jeter kick) (Drive: 4 plays, 90 yards, 1:30; South Carolina 34–14)
- (0:09) SC – Tyshawn Russell 50-yard pass from LaNorris Sellers (pass failed) (Drive: 5 plays, 67 yards, 2:01; South Carolina 40–14)

Fourth quarter

- (10:40) SC – Nyck Harbor 7-yard pass from LaNorris Sellers (Alex Herrera kick) (Drive: 6 plays, 38 yards, 2:24; South Carolina 47–14)
- (4:41) FU – Brock Chappell 16-yard pass from Carson Jones (Axel Lepvreau kick) (Drive: 1 play, 16 yards, 0:08; South Carolina 47–21)

Statistics	FU	SC
First downs	16	25
Total yards	65–323	77–571
Rushing yards	31–80	39–108
Passing yards	243	463
Passing: Comp–Att–Int	20–34–1	32–38–0
Time of possession	28:07	31:53

Team	Category	Player	Statistics
Furman	Passing	Tyler Huff	14/24, 129 yards, TD, INT
Furman	Rushing	Jayquan Smith	8 carries, 30 yards
Furman	Receiving	Joshua Harris	6 receptions, 73 yards
South Carolina	Passing	Spencer Rattler	25/27, 345 yards, 3 TD
South Carolina	Rushing	Dakereon Joyner	11 carries, 42 yards, TD
South Carolina	Receiving	Xavier Legette	6 receptions, 118 yards, TD

=== at No. 1 Georgia (rivalry) ===
Game Three – South Carolina Gamecocks (1–1) at No. 1 Georgia Bulldogs (2–0) – Game Summary

Quarter	1	2	3	4	Total
South Carolina	7	7	0	0	14
No. 1 Georgia	3	0	14	7	24

at Sanford Stadium • Athens, Georgia

- Date: Saturday, September 16, 2023
- Game time: 3:30 p.m. EST
- Game weather: Cloudy • 69 °F (21 °C) • Wind: SE 5 MPH
- Game attendance: 92,756
- Referee: Ken Williamson
- TV announcers (CBS): Brad Nessler (play-by-play), Gary Danielson (color) and Jenny Dell (sideline)

Game information

First quarter

- (9:56) SC – Antwane Wells Jr. 17-yard pass from Spencer Rattler (Mitch Jeter kick) (Drive: 10 plays, 65 yards, 5:04; South Carolina 7–0)
- (2:02) UGA – Peyton Woodring 31-yard field goal (Drive: 15 plays, 62 yards, 7:54; South Carolina 7–3)

Second quarter

- (1:00) SC – Dakereon Joyner 2-yard run (Mitch Jeter kick) (Drive: 5 plays, 80 yards, 2:27; South Carolina 14–3)

Third quarter

- (12:20) UGA – Daijun Edwards 7-yard run (Peyton Woodring kick) (Drive: 6 plays, 75 yards, 2:40; South Carolina 14–10)
- (7:40) UGA – Dillon Bell 3-yard run (Peyton Woodring kick) (Drive: 9 plays, 49 yards, 3:20; Georgia 17–14)

Fourth quarter

- (9:10) UGA – Cash Jones 13-yard run (Peyton Woodring kick) (Drive: 8 plays, 61 yards, 3:49; Georgia 24–14)

Statistics	SC	UGA
First downs	17	29
Total yards	58–309	79–459
Rushing yards	16–53	44–190
Passing yards	256	269
Passing: Comp–Att–Int	22–42–2	27–35–0
Time of possession	22:47	37:13

Team	Category	Player	Statistics
South Carolina	Passing	Spencer Rattler	22/42, 256 yards, TD, 2 INT
South Carolina	Rushing	Spencer Rattler	8 carries, 35 yards
South Carolina	Receiving	O'Mega Blake	5 receptions, 86 yards
Georgia	Passing	Carson Beck	27/35, 269 yards
Georgia	Rushing	Daijun Edwards	20 carries, 118 yards, TD
Georgia	Receiving	Marcus Rosemy-Jacksaint	6 receptions, 71 yards

=== vs Mississippi State ===
Game Four – Mississippi State Bulldogs (2–1) at South Carolina Gamecocks (1–2) – Game summary

Quarter	1	2	3	4	Total
Mississippi State	0	17	10	3	30
South Carolina	7	13	7	10	37

at Williams-Brice Stadium • Columbia, South Carolina

- Date: Saturday, September 23, 2023
- Game time: 7:30 p.m. EST
- Game weather: Sunny, 80 °F (27 °C)
- Game attendance: 78,311
- Referee: Matt Loeffler
- TV announcers (SECN): Tom Hart (play-by-play), Jordan Rodgers (analyst), Cole Cubelic (sideline)

Game information

First quarter

- (9:46) SC – Xavier Legette 76-yard pass from Spencer Rattler (Mitch Jeter kick) (Drive: 6 plays, 98 yards, 2:18; South Carolina 7–0)

Second quarter

- (14:53) SC – Trey Knox 17-yard pass from Spencer Rattler (Mitch Jeter kick) (Drive: 16 plays, 99 yards, 7:15; South Carolina 14–0)
- (14:39) MSST – Lideatrick Griffin 65-yard pass from Will Rogers (Kyle Ferrie kick) (Drive: 2 plays, 65 yards, 0:14; South Carolina 14–7)
- (7:02) MSST – Jo'Quavious Marks 7-yard run (Kyle Ferrie kick) (Drive: 3 plays, 68 yards, 1:05; Tied 14–14)
- (0:38) SC – Dakereon Joyner 3-yard run (pass failed) (Drive: 13 plays, 75 yards, 6:24; South Carolina 20–14)
- (0:00) MSST – Kyle Ferrie 49-yard field goal (Drive: 6 plays, 44 yards, 0:38; South Carolina 20–17)

Third quarter

- (14:50) SC – Xavier Legette 75-yard pass from Spencer Rattler (Mitch Jeter kick) (Drive: 1 play, 75 yards, 0:10; South Carolina 27–17)
- (10:26) MSST – Mike Wright 1-yard run (Kyle Ferrie kick) (Drive: 9 plays, 75 yards, 4:24; South Carolina 27–24)
- (2:00) MSST – Kyle Ferrie 23-yard field goal (Drive: 9 plays, 39 yards, 5:12; Tied 27–27)

Fourth quarter

- (12:35) SC – Mitch Jeter 35-yard field goal (Drive: 10 plays, 58 yards, 4:25; South Carolina 30–27)
- (9:36) SC – Mario Anderson 9-yard run (Mitch Jeter kick) (Drive: 4 plays, 22 yards, 1:43; South Carolina 37–27)
- (2:13) MSST – Kyle Ferrie 47-yard field goal (Drive: 13 plays, 68 yards, 2:42; South Carolina 37–30)

Statistics	MSST	SC
First downs	20	19
Total yards	71–519	67–432
Rushing yards	23–32	47–144
Passing yards	487	288
Passing: Comp–Att–Int	30–48–1	18–20–0
Time of possession	28:18	31:42

Team	Category	Player	Statistics
Mississippi State	Passing	Will Rogers	30/48, 487 yards, TD, INT
Mississippi State	Rushing	Jo'Quavious Marks	12 carries, 27 yards, TD
Mississippi State	Receiving	Lideatrick Griffin	7 receptions, 256 yards, TD
South Carolina	Passing	Spencer Rattler	18/20, 288 yards, 3 TD
South Carolina	Rushing	Mario Anderson	26 carries, 88 yards, TD
South Carolina	Receiving	Xavier Legette	5 receptions, 189 yards, 2 TD

=== at No. 21 Tennessee (rivalry) ===
Game Five – South Carolina Gamecocks (2–2) at No. 21 Tennessee Volunteers (3–1) – Game summary

Quarter	1	2	3	4	Total
South Carolina	10	0	7	3	20
No. 21 Tennessee	14	10	7	10	41

at Neyland Stadium • Knoxville, Tennessee

- Date: Saturday, September 30, 2023
- Game time: 7:30 p.m. EST
- Game weather: Sunny, 83 °F (28 °C)
- Game attendance: 101,915
- Referee: Daniel Gatreaux
- TV announcers (SEC Network): Tom Hart (play-by-play), Jordan Rodgers (analyst), Cole Cubelic (sideline)

Game information

First quarter

- (9:26) TENN – Jaylen Wright 42-yard run (Charles Campbell kick) (Drive: 9 plays, 94 yards, 3:02; Tennessee 7–0)
- (5:47) SC – Mitch Jeter 36-yard field goal (Drive: 8 plays, 57 yards, 3:41; Tennessee 7–3)
- (2:03) SC – Spencer Rattler 6-yard run (Mitch Jeter kick) (Drive: 6 plays, 29 yards, 2:52; South Carolina 10–7)
- (0:42) TENN – Jabari Small 2-yard run (Charles Campbell kick) (Drive: 4 plays, 75 yards, 1:21; Tennessee 14–10)

Second quarter

- (8:50) TENN – Charles Campbell 24-yard field goal (Drive: 8 plays, 63 yards, 2:14; Tennessee 17–10)
- (0:47) TENN – Kamal Hadden 28-yard interception return (Charles Campbell kick) (Tennessee 24–10)

Third quarter

- (10:41) TENN – Jacob Warren 6-yard pass from Joe Milton III (Charles Campbell kick) (Drive: 12 plays, 75 yards, 4:19; Tennessee 31–10)
- (10:28) SC – Mario Anderson 75-yard run (Mitch Jeter kick) (Drive: 1 play, 75 yards, 0:13; Tennessee 31–17)

Fourth quarter

- (12:42) TENN – Charles Campbell 33-yard field goal (Drive: 7 plays, 23 yards, 4:03; Tennessee 34–17)
- (8:35) SC – Mitch Jeter 47-yard field goal (Drive: 9 plays, 45 yards, 4:07; Tennessee 34–20)
- (4:09) TENN – Dylan Sampson 6-yard run (Charles Campbell kick) (Drive: 9 plays, 75 yards, 4:26; Tennessee 41–20)

Statistics	SC	TENN
First downs	11	24
Total yards	63–333	72–477
Rushing yards	27–132	40–238
Passing yards	201	239
Passing: Comp–Att–Int	25–36–1	21–32–2
Time of possession	30:15	29:45

Team	Category	Player	Statistics
South Carolina	Passing	Spencer Rattler	24/35, 169 yards, INT
South Carolina	Rushing	Mario Anderson	10 carries, 101 yards, TD
South Carolina	Receiving	Trey Knox	7 receptions, 51 yards
Tennessee	Passing	Joe Milton III	21/32, 239 yards, TD, 2 INT
Tennessee	Rushing	Jaylen Wright	16 carries, 123 yards, TD
Tennessee	Receiving	Squirrel White	9 receptions, 104 yards

=== vs Florida ===
Game Six – Florida Gators (4–2) at South Carolina Gamecocks (2–3) – Game summary

Quarter	1	2	3	4	Total
Florida	10	14	3	14	41
South Carolina	14	7	3	15	39

at Williams-Brice Stadium • Columbia, South Carolina

- Date: Saturday, October 14, 2023
- Game time: 3:30 p.m. EST
- Game weather: Temperature: 77 °F (25 °C) • Wind: W at 12 miles per hour (19 km/h) • Weather: sunny
- Game attendance: 79,247
- Referee: Steve Marlowe
- TV announcers (SECN): Taylor Zarzour (play-by-play), Matt Stinchcomb (analyst), Alyssa Lang (sideline)

Game information

First quarter

- (10:47) FLA – Trevor Etienne 3-yard run (Trey Smack kick) (Drive: 9 plays, 66 yards, 4:07; Florida 7-0)
- (7:49) SC – Trey Knox 6-yard pass from Spencer Rattler (Mitch Jeter kick) (Drive: 7 plays, 75 yards, 2:58; Tied 7-7)
- (4:08) FLA – Trey Smack 48-yard field goal (Drive: 8 plays, 45 yards, 3:41; Florida 10-7)
- (2:02) SC – Juju McDowell 17-yard run (Mitch Jeter kick) (Drive: 5 plays, 75 yards, 2:06; South Carolina 14-10)

Second quarter

- (13:39) FLA – Trey Smack 44-yard field goal (Drive: 10 plays, 49 yards, 3:23; South Carolina 14-13)
- (8:13) FLA – Kahleil Jackson 7-yard pass from Graham Mertz (Trevor Etienne pass to Hayden Hansen) (Drive: 5 plays, 82 yards, 2:23; Florida 21-14)
- (4:57) SC – Mario Anderson 20-yard pass from Spencer Rattler (Mitch Jeter kick) (Drive: 6 plays, 75 yards, 3:16; Tied 21-21)
- (0:03) FLA – Trey Smack 28-yard field goal (Drive: 5 plays, 45 yards, 1:21; Florida 24-21)

Third quarter

- (10:26) SC – Mitch Jeter 27-yard field goal (Drive: 10 plays, 66 yards, 4:34; Tied 24-24)
- (7:24) FLA – Trey Smack 54-yard field goal (Drive: 6 plays, 39 yards, 3:02; Florida 27-24)

Fourth quarter

- (14:55) SC – Juju McDowell 3-yard pass from Spencer Rattler (Mitch Jeter kick) (Drive: 10 plays, 72 yards, 3:42; South Carolina 31-27)
- (9:11) SC – Joshua Simon 33-yard pass from Spencer Rattler (run failed) (Drive: 5 plays, 69 yards, 2:21; South Carolina 37-27)
- (4:40) FLA – Arlis Boardingham 4-yard pass from Graham Mertz (Trey Smack kick) (Drive: 14 plays, 75 yards, 4:31; South Carolina 37-34)
- (0:47) FLA – Ricky Pearsall 21-yard pass from Graham Mertz (Trey Smack kick) (Drive: 9 plays, 75 yards, 1:56; Florida 41-37)
- (0:04) SC – 0-yard safety (Florida 41-39)

Statistics	FLA	SC
First downs	28	23
Total yards	81–494	63–465
Rushing yards	33–71	33–152
Passing yards	423	313
Passing: Comp–Att–Int	30–48–0	23–30–1
Time of possession	32:44	27:16

Team	Category	Player	Statistics
Florida	Passing	Graham Mertz	30/48, 423 yards, 3 TD
Florida	Rushing	Montrell Johnson Jr.	11 carries, 50 yards
Florida	Receiving	Ricky Pearsall	10 receptions, 166 yards, TD
South Carolina	Passing	Spencer Rattler	23/30, 313 yards, 4 TD, INT
South Carolina	Rushing	Mario Anderson	20 carries, 98 yards
South Carolina	Receiving	Xavier Legette	5 receptions, 110 yards

=== at No. 20 Missouri (rivalry) ===
Game Seven – South Carolina Gamecocks (2–4) at No. 20 Missouri Tigers (6–1) – Game summary

Quarter	1	2	3	4	Total
South Carolina	0	3	6	3	12
No. 20 Missouri	14	10	0	10	34

at Faurot Field • Columbia, Missouri

- Date: Saturday, October 21, 2023
- Game time: 3:30 p.m. EST
- Game weather: – Sunny, 78 degrees, 10 mph NW winds
- Game attendance: 62,621
- Referee: Kyle Olson
- TV announcers (SECN): Taylor Zarzour (play-by-play), Matt Stinchcomb (analyst), Alyssa Lang (sideline)

Game information

First quarter

- (6:31) MIZZ: Luther Burden III 42-yard pass from Brady Cook (Harrison Mevis kick) (Drive: 5 plays, 67 yards, 2:30; Missouri 7-0)
- (0:46) MIZZ: Cody Schrader 10-yard run (Harrison Mevis kick) (Drive: 7 plays, 59 yards, 3:26; Missouri 14-0)

Second quarter

- (8:21) MIZZ: Brady Cook 17-yard run (Harrison Mevis kick) (Drive: 10 plays, 87 yards, 4:02; Missouri 21-0)
- (1:50) MIZZ: Harrison Mevis 21-yard field goal (Drive: 9 plays, 82 yards, 3:48; Missouri 24-0)
- (0:31) SCAR: Mitch Jeter 51-yard field goal (Drive: 10 plays, 42 yards, 1:19; Missouri 24-3)

Third quarter

- (10:37) SCAR: Mitch Jeter 41-yard field goal (Drive: 10 plays, 54 yards, 4:16; Missouri 24-6)
- (7:07) SCAR: Mitch Jeter 38-yard field goal (Drive: 5 plays, 14 yards, 1:44; Missouri 24-9)

Fourth quarter

- (13:42) MIZZ: Harrison Mevis 53-yard field goal (Drive: 10 plays, 26 yards, 4:35; Missouri 27-9)
- (10:31) SCAR: Mitch Jeter 21-yard field goal (Drive: 9 plays, 72 yards, 3:11; Missouri 27-12)
- (2:46) MIZZ: Cody Schrader 11-yard run (Harrison Mevis kick) (Drive: 9 plays, 67 yards, 3:34; Missouri 34-12)

Statistics	SC	MIZZ
First downs	20	22
Total plays-yards	69–286	65–418
Rushing attempts-yards	29–69	40–213
Passing attempts-yards	40–217	25–205
Passing: Comp–Att–Int	23–40–1	15–25–0
Time of possession	31:08	28:52

Team	Category	Player	Statistics
South Carolina	Passing	Spencer Rattler	23–40, 217 yards, 1 INT
South Carolina	Rushing	Mario Anderson	12 carries, 68 yards
South Carolina	Receiving	Nyck Harbor	2 receptions, 50 yards
Missouri	Passing	Brady Cook	15–25, 205 yards, 1 TD
Missouri	Rushing	Cody Schrader	26 carries, 159 yards, 2 TD
Missouri	Receiving	Luther Burden III	5 receptions, 97 yards, 1 TD

=== at Texas A&M ===
Game Eight– South Carolina Gamecocks (2–5) at Texas A&M Aggies (4–3) – Game summary

Quarter	1	2	3	4	Total
South Carolina	7	0	3	7	17
Texas A&M	0	21	3	6	30

at Kyle Field • College Station, Texas

- Date: Saturday, October 28, 2023
- Game time: 12:00 p.m. EST
- Game weather: Cloudy • 82 °F (28 °C) • Wind: S 10.3 MPH
- Game attendance: 95,297
- Referee: Scott Walker
- TV announcers (ESPN): Mark Jones, Louis Riddick, and Quint Kessenich

Game information
First quarter
- SC – Dakereon Joyner 1-yard run (Mitch Jeter kick), 2:04. Gamecocks 7–0. Drive: 13 plays, 65 yards, 6:41.

Second quarter

- TAMU – Rueben Owens 14-yard run (Randy Bond kick), 9:00. Tied 7–7. Drive: 6 plays, 55 yards, 3:03.
- TAMU – Amari Daniels 1-yard run (Randy Bond kick), 1:44. Aggies 14–7. Drive: 10 plays, 48 yards, 6:19.
- TAMU – Ainias Smith 42-yard pass from Max Johnson (Randy Bond kick), 0:52. Aggies 21–7. Drive: 1 play, 42 yards, 0:13.

Third quarter

- SC – Mitch Jeter 49-yard field goal, 10:58. Aggies 21–10. Drive: 10 plays, 43 yards, 4:02.
- TAMU – Randy Bond 26-yard field goal, 2:46. Aggies 24–10. Drive: 13 plays, 75 yards, 6:26.

Fourth quarter

- SC – Joshua Simon 2-yard pass from Spencer Rattler (Mitch Jeter kick), 14:56. Aggies 24–17. Drive: 7 plays, 77 yards, 2:50.
- TAMU – Randy Bond 24-yard field goal, 11:00. Aggies 27–17. Drive: 8 plays, 69 yards, 3:56.
- TAMU – Randy Bond 52-yard field goal, 7:39. Aggies 30–17. Drive: 4 plays, −2 yards, 2:04.

Statistics	SC	TXAM
First downs	12	19
Total yards	209	354
Rushing yards	33	105
Passing yards	176	249
Turnovers	1	0
Time of possession	23:30	36:30

Team	Category	Player	Statistics
South Carolina	Passing	Spencer Rattler	20/33, 176 yards, TD
South Carolina	Rushing	Mario Anderson	16 rushes, 72 yards
South Carolina	Receiving	Nyck Harbor	6 receptions, 59 yards
Texas A&M	Passing	Max Johnson	20/30, 249 yards, TD
Texas A&M	Rushing	Amari Daniels	13 rushes, 68 yards, TD
Texas A&M	Receiving	Ainias Smith	6 receptions, 118 yards, TD

=== vs Jacksonville State ===
Game Nine – Jacksonville State Gamecocks (7–2) at South Carolina Gamecocks (2–6) – Game summary

Quarter	1	2	3	4	Total
Jacksonville State	7	7	14	0	28
South Carolina	14	7	7	10	38

at Williams-Brice Stadium • Columbia, South Carolina

- Date: Saturday, November 4, 2023
- Game time: 12:00 PM EST
- Game weather: Clear • 61 °F (16 °C) • Wind: N 3.6 MPH
- Game attendance: 75,348
- Referee: Jason Autrey
- TV announcers (ESPNU): Brian Custer (play-by-play), Rod Gilmore (analyst), Lauren Sisler (sideline)

Game information

First quarter

- (11:07) SC – Tonka Hemingway 2-yard run (Mitch Jeter Kick) (Drive: 5 plays, 62 yards, 2:38; South Carolina 7–0)
- (3:44) JVST – Sean Brown 15-yard pass from Zion Webb (Alen Karajic Kick) (Drive: 8 plays, 62 yards, 2:36; Tied 7–7)
- (2:03) SC – Spencer Rattler 1-yard run (Mitch Jeter Kick) (Drive: 5 plays, 70 yards, 1:41; South Carolina 14–7)

Second quarter

- (14:16) JVST – Anwar Lewis 4-yard run (Alen Karajic Kick) (Drive: 9 plays, 75 yards, 2:47; Tied 14–14)
- (0:23) SC – Xavier Legette 5-yard pass from Spencer Rattler (Mitch Jeter Kick) (Drive: 4 plays, 49 yards, 0:30; South Carolina 21–14)

Third quarter

- (11:50) JVST – Sean Brown 13-yard pass from Logan Smothers (Alen Karajic Kick) (Drive: 8 plays, 73 yards, 3:02; Tied 21–21)
- (5:30) JVST – Perry Carter 54-yard pass from Zion Webb (Alen Karajic Kick) (Drive: 3 plays, 62 yards, 1:16; Jacksonville State 28–21)
- (1:29) SC – Xavier Legette 65-yard pass from Spencer Rattler (Mitch Jeter Kick) (Drive: 1 play, 65 yards, 0:11; Tied 28–28)

Fourth quarter

- (5:51) SC – Mitch Jeter 26-yard Field Goal (Drive: 10 plays, 48 yards, 3:58; South Carolina 31–28)
- (2:02) SC – Stone Blanton 88-yard interception return (Mitch Jeter Kick) (Drive: 11 play, 58 yards, 3:49; South Carolina 38–28)

Statistics	JVST	SC
First downs	23	20
Total yards	84–421	77–488
Rushing yards	57–225	38–89
Passing yards	196	399
Passing: Comp–Att–Int	13–27–2	27–39–1
Time of possession	27:07	32:53

Team	Category	Player	Statistics
Jacksonville State	Passing	Zion Webb	12/23, 183 yards, 2 TD, INT
Jacksonville State	Rushing	Ron Wiggins	17 carries, 88 yards
Jacksonville State	Receiving	Perry Carter	5 receptions, 106 yards, TD
South Carolina	Passing	Spencer Rattler	27/38, 399 yards, 2 TD, INT
South Carolina	Rushing	Mario Anderson	16 carries, 75 yards
South Carolina	Receiving	Xavier Legette	9 receptions, 217 yards, 2 TD

=== vs Vanderbilt ===
Game Ten – Vanderbilt Commodores (2–8) at South Carolina Gamecocks (3–6) – Game summary

Quarter	1	2	3	4	Total
Vanderbilt	0	0	0	6	6
South Carolina	6	7	14	20	47

at Williams-Brice Stadium • Columbia, South Carolina

- Date: Saturday, November 11, 2023
- Game time: 12:00 p.m. EST
- Game weather: Rainy • 50 °F (10 °C) • Wind: NE 6.5 MPH
- Game attendance: 75,682
- TV announcers (SECN): Taylor Zarzour (play-by-play), Matt Stinchcomb (analyst), Taylor Davis (sideline)

Game information

First quarter

- (6:37) SC – Alex Huntley 1-yard pass from Spencer Rattler (Two-Point Pass Conversion Failed) (Drive: 5 plays, 46 yards, 2:44; South Carolina 6–0)

Second quarter

- (14:16) SC – Spencer Rattler 1-yard Run (Mitch Jeter Kick) (Drive: 10 plays, 95 yards, 4:35; South Carolina 13–0)

Third quarter

- (7:09) SC – Ahmarean Brown 24-yard pass from Spencer Rattler (Mitch Jeter Kick) (Drive: 9 plays, 85 yards, 3:39; South Carolina 20–0)
- (5:12) SC – Mario Anderson 72-yard Run (Mitch Jeter Kick) (Drive: 2 plays, 82 yards, 0:44; South Carolina 27–0)

Fourth quarter

- (14:55) VAN – Quincy Skinner Jr. 19-yard pass from Ken Seals (Jacob Borcila PAT failed) (Drive: 12 plays, 75 yards, 5:17; South Carolina 27–6)
- (11:20) SC – Keenan Nelson Jr. 18-yard Return of Blocked Punt (Mitch Jeter Kick) (Drive: 6 plays, 16 yards, 1:57; South Carolina 34–6)
- (5:53) SC – O'Mega Blake 26-yard pass from Spencer Rattler (Mitch Jeter PAT failed) (Drive: 5 plays, 39 yards, 2:45; South Carolina 40–6)
- (2:20) SC – LaNorris Sellers 36-yard Run (Mitch Jeter Kick) (Drive: 4 plays, 44 yards, 2:02; South Carolina 47–6)

Statistics	VAN	SC
First downs	17	21
Total yards	235	487
Rushing yards	131	136
Passing yards	104	351
Passing: Comp–Att–Int	13–28–0	28–36–1
Time of possession	32:47	27:13

Team	Category	Player	Statistics
Vanderbilt	Passing	Ken Seals	13–28, 103 yards, TD
Vanderbilt	Rushing	Walter Taylor	6 carries, 39 yards
Vanderbilt	Receiving	London Humphreys	3 receptions, 33 yards
South Carolina	Passing	Spencer Rattler	28–36, 351 yards, 3 TD, INT
South Carolina	Rushing	Mario Anderson	9 carries, 102 yards, TD
South Carolina	Receiving	Xavier Legette	9 receptions, 120 yards

=== vs Kentucky ===
Game Eleven – Kentucky Wildcats (6–4) at South Carolina Gamecocks (4–6) – Game summary

Quarter	1	2	3	4	Total
Kentucky	0	7	7	0	14
South Carolina	10	0	0	7	17

at Williams-Brice Stadium • Columbia, South Carolina

- Date: Saturday, November 18, 2023
- Game time: 7:30 p.m. EST
- Game weather: –
- Game attendance: 77,788
- Referee: –
- TV announcers (SECN): Tom hart (play-by-play), Jordan Rodgers (color), Cole Cubelic (sideline)

Game information

First quarter

- (7:27) SC – Xavier Legette 13-yard pass from Spencer Rattler (Mitch Jeter kick) (Drive: 11 plays, 69 yards, 5:11; South Carolina 7–0)
- (0:13) SC – Mitch Jeter 23-yard field goal (Drive: 12 plays, 51 yards, 6:32; South Carolina 10–0)

Second quarter

- (10:52) UK – Barion Brown 7-yard pass from Devin Leary (Alex Raynor kick) (Drive: 7 plays, 55 yards, 3:51; South Carolina 10–7)

Third quarter

- (8:42) UK – Ray Davis 31-yard run (Alex Raynor kick) (Drive: 9 plays, 92 yards, 5:20; Kentucky 14–10)

Fourth quarter

- (7:44) SC – Xavier Legette 17-yard pass from Spencer Rattler (Mitch Jeter kick) (Drive: 9 plays, 74 yards, 5:32; South Carolina 17–14)

Statistics	UK	SC
First downs	17	17
Total yards	293	257
Rushing yards	122	50
Passing yards	171	207
Passing: Comp–Att–Int	17–34–1	19–27–0
Time of possession	28:21	31:39

Team	Category	Player	Statistics
Kentucky	Passing	Devin Leary	17/34, 171 yards, TD, INT
Kentucky	Rushing	Ray Davis	12 carries, 61 yards, TD
Kentucky	Receiving	Dane Key	4 receptions, 51 yards
South Carolina	Passing	Spencer Rattler	19/27, 207 yards, 2 TD
South Carolina	Rushing	Mario Anderson	13 carries, 27 yards
South Carolina	Receiving	Xavier Legette	6 receptions, 94 yards, 2 TD

=== vs No. 24 Clemson (rivalry) ===
Game Twelve– No. 24 Clemson Tigers (7-4) at South Carolina Gamecocks (5-6) – Game summary

Quarter	1	2	3	4	Total
No. 24 Clemson	10	3	3	0	16
South Carolina	7	0	0	0	7

at Williams-Brice Stadium • Columbia, South Carolina

- Date: Saturday, November 25, 2023
- Game time: 7:30 p.m. EST
- Game weather: Temperature: 48 °F (9 °C) • Wind: NE @ 3 mph (4.8 km/h) • Weather: Clear
- Game attendance: 80,172
- Referee: Jeff Flanagan
- TV announcers (SECN): Taylor Zarzour (play-by-play), Matt Stinchcomb (analyst), Alyssa Lang (sideline)

Game information

First quarter

- (14:25) CLEM – Khalil Barnes 42-yard fumble recovery (Johnathan Weitz kick) (Clemson 7–0)
- (6:39) SC – Luke Doty 1-yard run (Mitch Jeter kick) (Drive: 12 plays, 81 yards, 5:37; Tied 7–7)
- (0:43) CLEM – Jonathan Weitz 50-yard field goal (Drive: 11 plays, 42 yards, 5:56; Clemson 10–7)

Second quarter

- (5:07) CLEM – Jonathan Weitz 49-yard field goal (Drive: 7 plays, 13 yards, 2:37; Clemson 13–7)

Third quarter

- (13:16) CLEM – Jonathan Weitz 42 yard field goal (Drive: 6 plays, 50 yards, 1:44; Clemson 16–7)

Fourth quarter

- No scoring

Statistics	CLEM	SC
First downs	19	12
Total yards	73–319	56–169
Rushing yards	46–219	24–57
Passing yards	100	112
Passing: Comp–Att–Int	15–27–1	16–32–1
Time of possession	38:00	22:00

Team	Category	Player	Statistics
Clemson	Passing	Cade Klubnik	15/27, 100 yards, INT
Clemson	Rushing	Phil Mafah	19 rushes, 89 yards
Clemson	Receiving	Tyler Brown	5 receptions, 40 yards
South Carolina	Passing	Spencer Rattler	16/32, 112 yards, INT
South Carolina	Rushing	Mario Anderson	13 rushes, 35 yards
South Carolina	Receiving	Xavier Legette	6 receptions, 68 yards

== Honoring Alshon Jeffery and the early 2010s teams ==
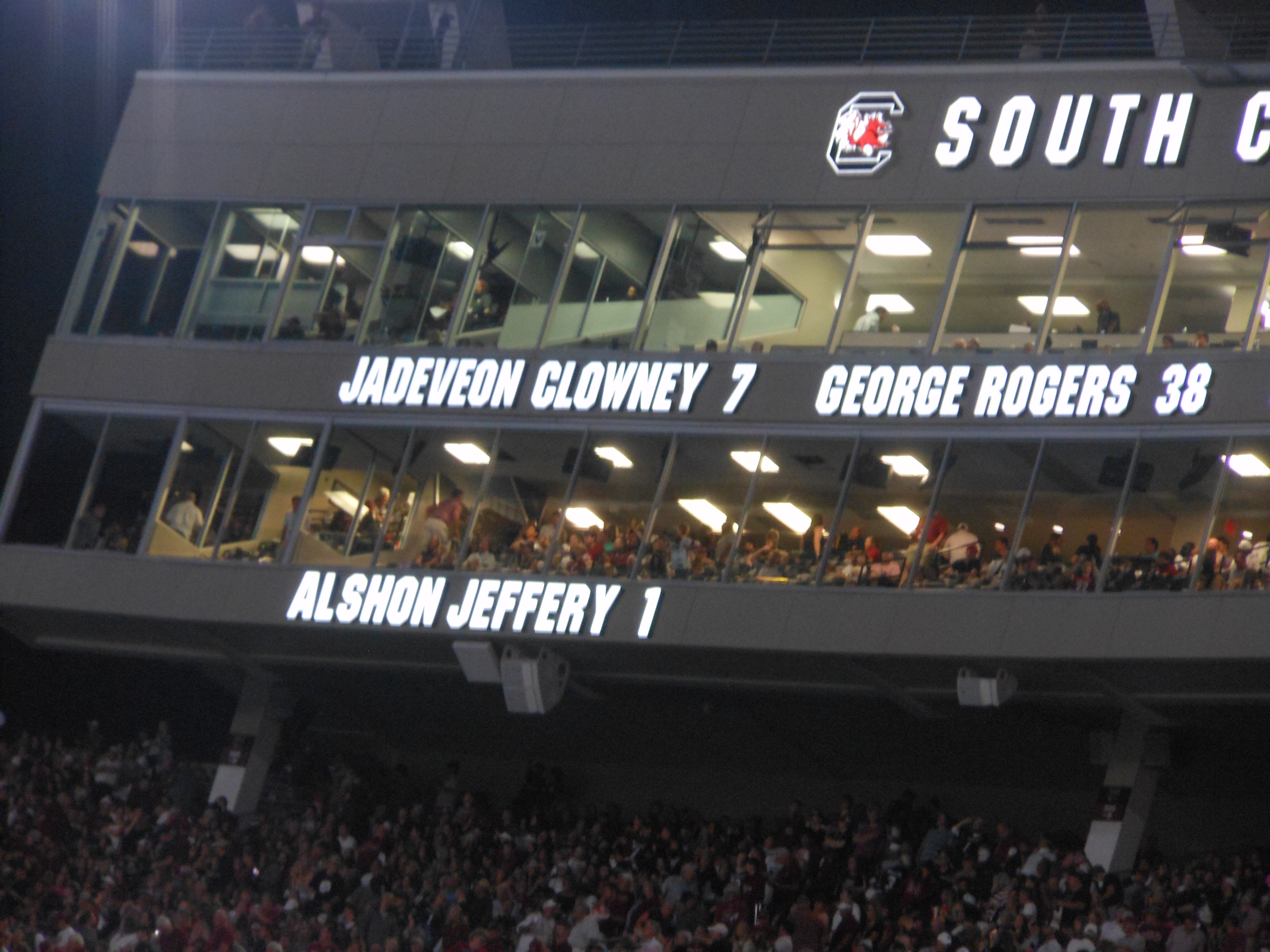
Alshon Jeffery’s name and number being lit up for the first time in Williams–Brice Stadium, following his jersey retirement

During halftime of the home game against Mississippi State on September 23, 2023, the university retired Alshon Jeffery's jersey, only the sixth retired jersey in program history, and second in two years, following Jadeveon Clowney in 2022.

Several weeks later, during halftime of the home game against Jacksonville State on November 4, 2023, the university honored the 2010, 2011, 2012, and 2013 Gamecock football teams, ten years after the 2013 team played. Over that four-year stretch, Steve Spurrier led the Gamecocks to a combined 42–11 with one SEC East Championship. It was the most successful era in program history. Spurrier as well as roughly forty former players and their families were in attendance for the ceremony.

A special recognition had been in the works for several years, but had been rescheduled several times because of the COVID-19 pandemic, hurricanes, and conflicts with Spurrier’s schedule and availability. However, the timing was still not without some controversy, as D.J. Swearinger publicly expressed his displeasure with the ceremony taking place at halftime against a non-SEC and non-Power 5 school.

Spurrier gave a speech to the crowd: “Everybody asks, how’d you guys do it? I say, first of all we had talented players with the attitude, effort and leadership among the older guys passed through the team ... I’m a Florida Gator now, but my wife and I will always be South Carolina Gamecocks.”

== Rankings ==
Ranking movements Legend: ██ Increase in ranking ██ Decrease in ranking — = Not ranked RV = Received votes
	Week															
Poll	Pre	1	2	3	4	5	6	7	8	9	10	11	12	13	14	Final
AP	RV	—	—	—												
Coaches	RV	RV	RV	—												
CFP	Not released															Not released

== Coaching staff ==
Name	Position	Consecutive season
Shane Beamer	Head coach	3rd
Dowell Loggains	Offensive coordinator and quarterbacks coach	1st
Clayton White	Defensive coordinator and inside linebackers coach	3rd
Pete Lembo	Associate head coach/special teams coordinator	3rd
Torrian Gray	Defensive backs coach	3rd
Montario Hardesty	Running backs coach	3rd
Lonnie Teasley	Offensive line coach	1st
Justin Stepp	Wide receivers coach	3rd
Jody Wright	Tight ends coach	2nd
Sterling Lucas	Outside linebackers coach	2nd
Travian Robertson	Defensive line coach	1st
