= 2023 Florida Gators football team =

American college football season

2023 Florida Gators football
- Conference: Southeastern Conference
- Eastern Division
- Record: 5–7 (3–5 SEC)
- Head coach: Billy Napier (2nd season)
- Offensive coordinator: Rob Sale (2nd season)
- Offensive scheme: Pro-style
- Defensive coordinator: Austin Armstrong (1st season)
- Co-defensive coordinator: Sean Spencer (2nd season)
- Base defense: 4–2–5
- Home stadium: Ben Hill Griffin Stadium

2023 Southeastern Conference football standings
	Conf.			Overall
Team	W		L	W		L
Eastern Division
No. 4 Georgia xy	8	–	0	13	–	1
No. 8 Missouri	6	–	2	11	–	2
No. 17 Tennessee	4	–	4	9	–	4
Kentucky	3	–	5	7	–	6
Florida	3	–	5	5	–	7
South Carolina	3	–	5	5	–	7
Vanderbilt	0	–	8	2	–	10
Western Division
No. 5 Alabama xy$^	8	–	0	12	–	2
No. 9 Ole Miss	6	–	2	11	–	2
No. 12 LSU	6	–	2	10	–	3
Texas A&M	4	–	4	7	–	6
Auburn	3	–	5	6	–	7
Mississippi State	1	–	7	5	–	7
Arkansas	1	–	7	4	–	8
Championship: Alabama 27, Georgia 24
^ – College Football Playoff participant; $ – Conference champion; x – Division champion/co-champions; y – Championship game participant; Rankings from AP Poll

The 2023 Florida Gators football team represented the University of Florida in the Eastern Division of the Southeastern Conference (SEC) during the 2023 NCAA Division I FBS football season. Led by second-year head coach Billy Napier, the Gators played home games at Ben Hill Griffin Stadium in Gainesville, Florida.

== Schedule ==
Date	Time	Opponent	Rank	Site	TV	Result	Attendance
August 31	8:00 p.m.	at No. 14 Utah*		Rice–Eccles Stadium; Salt Lake City, UT	ESPN	L 11–24	53,644
September 9	7:30 p.m.	McNeese*		Ben Hill Griffin Stadium; Gainesville, FL	ESPNU	W 49–7	88,163
September 16	7:00 p.m.	No. 11 Tennessee		Ben Hill Griffin Stadium; Gainesville, FL (rivalry)	ESPN	W 29–16	90,751
September 23	7:00 p.m.	Charlotte*	No. 25	Ben Hill Griffin Stadium; Gainesville, FL	SECN+, ESPN+	W 22–7	89,053
September 30	12:00 p.m.	at Kentucky	No. 22	Kroger Field; Lexington, KY (rivalry, SEC Nation)	ESPN	L 14–33	61,699
October 7	4:00 p.m.	Vanderbilt^{†}		Ben Hill Griffin Stadium; Gainesville, FL	SECN	W 38–14	89,432
October 14	3:30 p.m.	at South Carolina		Williams–Brice Stadium; Columbia, SC	SECN	W 41–39	79,247
October 28	3:30 p.m.	vs. No. 1 Georgia		EverBank Stadium; Jacksonville, FL (rivalry, SEC Nation)	CBS	L 20–43	76,251
November 4	12:00 p.m.	Arkansas		Ben Hill Griffin Stadium; Gainesville, FL	ESPN2	L 36–39 ^{OT}	89,782
November 11	7:30 p.m.	at No. 19 LSU		Tiger Stadium; Baton Rouge, LA (rivalry)	SECN	L 35–52	102,321
November 18	7:30 p.m.	at No. 9 Missouri		Faurot Field; Columbia, MO	ESPN	L 31–33	62,621
November 25	7:00 p.m.	No. 5 Florida State*		Ben Hill Griffin Stadium; Gainesville, FL (Sunshine Showdown)	ESPN	L 15–24	90,341
*Non-conference game; ^{†}Homecoming; Rankings from AP Poll (and CFP Rankings, after October 31) released prior to game; All times are in Eastern time

== Rankings ==
Ranking movements Legend: ██ Increase in ranking ██ Decrease in ranking — = Not ranked RV = Received votes
	Week															
Poll	Pre	1	2	3	4	5	6	7	8	9	10	11	12	13	14	Final
AP	RV	—	—	25	22	—	—	RV	RV	—	—	—	—	—		
Coaches	RV	—	—	RV	23	RV	RV	RV	RV	RV	—	—	—	—		
CFP	Not released									—	—	—	—	—		Not released

== Game summaries ==
=== No. 14 Utah ===
The season-opening matchup against Utah was notable for it being the Gators' first non-conference true road game outside the state of Florida since a 38–21 loss to Syracuse in the 1991 season. With the loss, the Gators' most recent non-conference road win outside the state of Florida remains a 38–13 win at Memphis State on September 23, 1989. They also had not played a road game west of the Rocky Mountains since a 1983 game at USC.

Overall record	Previous meeting	Previous winner	Score
2–0	September 3, 2022	Florida	29–26

Uniform combination
Helmet	Jersey	Pants

Game one – Florida Gators at No. 14 Utah Utes – Game summary

Quarter	1	2	3	4	Total
Florida	3	0	0	8	11
No. 14 Utah	7	10	7	0	24

at Rice–Eccles Stadium • Salt Lake City, Utah

- Date: August 31
- Game time: 6:05 p.m. MDT
- Game weather: Temperature: 92 °F (33 °C) • Wind: W at 1 mile per hour (1.6 km/h) • Weather: sunny
- Game attendance: 53,644
- Referee: David Smith
- TV announcers (ESPN): Chris Fowler (play-by-play), Kirk Herbstreit (analyst), and Holly Rowe (sideline reporter)
- Boxscore

Game information

First quarter

- Utah – Money Parks 70-yard pass from Bryson Barnes (Cole Becker kick), 13:10
- Florida – Adam Mihalek 32-yard field goal, 2:27

Second quarter

- Utah – Nate Johnson 27-yard run (Cole Becker kick), 7:50
- Utah – Cole Becker 51-yard field goal, 2:52

Third quarter

- Utah – Bryson Barnes 5-yard run (Cole Becker kick), 11:06

Fourth quarter

- Florida – Caleb Douglas 19-yard pass from Graham Mertz (Eugene Wilson III pass), 9:22

Statistics	Florida	Utah
First downs	17	13
Plays–yards	65–346	53–270
Rushes–yards	21–13	30–105
Passing yards	333	165
Passing: comp–att–int	31–44–1	15–23–0
Turnovers		
Time of possession	31:56	28:04

Team	Category	Player	Statistics
Florida	Passing	Graham Mertz	31/44, 333 yards, 1 TD, 1 INT
Florida	Rushing	Trevor Etienne	7 carries, 25 yards
Florida	Receiving	Ricky Pearsall	8 receptions, 92 yards
Utah	Passing	Bryson Barnes	12/18, 159 yards, 1 TD
Utah	Rushing	Micah Bernard; Nate Johnson	45 yards 45 yards, 1 TD
Utah	Receiving	Money Parks	1 reception, 70 yards, 1 TD

=== McNeese ===
Previous meeting
First Meeting

Game two – McNeese Cowboys (FCS) (0–1) at Florida Gators (0–1) – Game summary

Quarter	1	2	3	4	Total
McNeese	0	0	0	7	7
Florida	13	13	16	7	49

at Ben Hill Griffin Stadium • Gainesville, Florida

- Date: September 9
- Game time: 7:35 p.m. EDT
- Game weather: Sunny
- Game attendance: 88,163
- Referee: Wayne Winkler
- TV announcers (ESPNU): Beth Mowins (play-by-play), Kirk Morrison (analyst), and Stormy Buonantony (sideline reporter)
- Boxscore

Game information

First quarter

- Florida – Montrell Johnson Jr. 2-yard run, 10:59
- Florida – Graham Mertz 1 yard run (Adam Mihalek kick), 0:28

Second quarter

- Florida – Treyaun Webb 2-yard run, 7:04
- Florida – Trevor Etienne 8-yard run (Adam Mihalek kick), 0:34

Third quarter

- Florida – Montrell Johnson Jr. 8-yard run (Adam Mihalek kick), 9:27
- Florida – Ricky Pearsall 50-yard pass from Graham Mertz (Adam Mihalek kick), 3:45
- Florida – Jamari Lyons 0-yard safety, 2:54

Fourth quarter

- Florida – Treyaun Webb 5-yard run (Trey Smack kick), 13:00
- McNeese – Coleby Hamm 8-yard run (Garrison Smith kick), 2:24

Statistics	McNeese	Florida
First downs	6	33
Plays–yards	40–112	74–560
Rushes–yards	26–46	51–327
Passing yards	66	233
Passing: comp–att–int	7–14–0	18–23–0
Turnovers		
Time of possession	23:51	36:09

Team	Category	Player	Statistics
McNeese	Passing	Nate Glantz	6/13, 62 yards
McNeese	Rushing	D'Angelo Durham	11 carries, 45 yards
McNeese	Receiving	Jon McCall	1 reception, 18 yards
Florida	Passing	Graham Mertz	14/17, 193 yards, 1 TD
Florida	Rushing	Montrell Johnson Jr.	15 carries, 119 yards, 2 TD
Florida	Receiving	Ricky Pearsall	6 receptions, 123 yards

=== No. 11 Tennessee ===
Overall record	Previous meeting	Previous winner	Score
31–21	September 24, 2022	Tennessee	38–33

Game three – No. 11 Tennessee Volunteers (2–0) at Florida Gators (1–1) – Game summary

Quarter	1	2	3	4	Total
No. 11 Tennessee	7	0	3	6	16
Florida	6	20	0	3	29

at Ben Hill Griffin Stadium • Gainesville, Florida

- Date: September 16
- Game time: 7:08 p.m. EDT
- Game weather: Temperature: 85 °F (29 °C) • Wind: NE at 4 miles per hour (6.4 km/h) • Weather: sunny
- Game attendance: 90,751
- Referee: Scott Walker
- TV announcers (ESPN): Chris Fowler (play-by-play), Kirk Herbstreit (analyst), and Holly Rowe (sideline reporter)
- Boxscore

Game information

First quarter

- Tennessee – Ramel Keaton 11-yard pass from Joe Milton III (Charles Campbell kick), 5:33
- Florida – Trevor Etienne 62-yard run, 4:10

Second quarter

- Florida – Montrell Johnson Jr. 4-yard run, 9:28
- Florida – Graham Mertz 1 yard run (Trey Smack kick), 7:20
- Florida – Montrell Johnson Jr. 18-yard pass from Graham Mertz (Trey Smack kick), 2:22

Third quarter

- Tennessee – Charles Campbell 42-yard field goal, 9:31

Fourth quarter

- Florida – Trey Smack 27-yard field goal, 9:55
- Tennessee – Bru McCoy 55-yard pass from Joe Milton III, 8:41

Statistics	Tennessee	Florida
First downs	17	22
Plays–yards	64–387	67–349
Rushes–yards	30–100	43–183
Passing yards	287	166
Passing: comp–att–int	20–34–1	19–24–0
Turnovers		
Time of possession	22:32	37:28

Team	Category	Player	Statistics
Tennessee	Passing	Joe Milton III	20/34, 287 yards, 2 TD, 1 INT
Tennessee	Rushing	Jaylen Wright	16 carries, 63 yards
Tennessee	Receiving	Bru McCoy	5 receptions, 94 yards, 1 TD
Florida	Passing	Graham Mertz	19/24, 166 yards, 1 TD
Florida	Rushing	Trevor Etienne	23 carries, 172 yards, 1 TD
Florida	Receiving	Eugene Wilson III	6 receptions, 44 yards

=== Charlotte ===
Previous meeting
First Meeting

Game four – Charlotte 49ers (1–2) at No. 25 Florida Gators (2–1) – Game summary

Quarter	1	2	3	4	Total
Charlotte	0	7	0	0	7
No. 25 Florida	10	6	3	3	22

at Ben Hill Griffin Stadium • Gainesville, Florida

- Date: September 23
- Game time: 7:02 p.m. EDT
- Game weather: Temperature: 84 °F (29 °C) • E at 4 miles per hour (6.4 km/h) • Weather: cloudy
- Game attendance: 89,053
- Referee: Lee Hedrick
- TV announcers (ESPN+/SECN+): Clay Matvick (play-by-play) and Aaron Murray (analyst)
- Boxscore

Game information

First quarter

- Florida – Arlis Boardingham 6-yard pass from Graham Mertz (Trey Smack kick), 8:26
- Florida – Trey Smack 27-yard field goal, 4:14

Second quarter

- Florida – Trey Smack 23-yard field goal, 12:50
- Florida – Trey Smack 54-yard field goal, 8:21
- Charlotte – Jalon Jones 7-yard run (Kyle Cunanan kick), 2:30

Third quarter

- Florida – Trey Smack 36-yard field goal, 7:27

Fourth quarter

- Florida – Trey Smack 23-yard field goal, 2:28

Statistics	Charlotte	Florida
First downs	10	21
Plays–yards	53–210	59–395
Rushes–yards	28–77	36–136
Passing yards	133	259
Passing: comp–att–int	14–25–0	20–23–0
Turnovers		
Time of possession	28:25	31:35

Team	Category	Player	Statistics
Charlotte	Passing	Jalon Jones	11/16, 111 yards
Charlotte	Rushing	Jalon Jones	20 carries, 65 yards, 1 TD
Charlotte	Receiving	Colin Weber	4 receptions, 54 yards
Florida	Passing	Graham Mertz	20/23, 259 yards, 1 TD
Florida	Rushing	Montrell Johnson Jr.	16 carries, 63 yards
Florida	Receiving	Ricky Pearsall	6 receptions, 104 yards

=== Kentucky ===
Overall record	Previous meeting	Previous winner	Score
53–20	September 10, 2022	Kentucky	26–16

Game five – No. 22 Florida Gators (3–1) at Kentucky Wildcats (4–0) – Game summary

Quarter	1	2	3	4	Total
No. 22 Florida	0	7	7	0	14
Kentucky	16	7	7	3	33

at Kroger Field • Lexington, Kentucky

- Date: September 30
- Game time: 12:07 p.m. EDT
- Game weather: Temperature: 78 °F (26 °C) • Wind: E at 6 miles per hour (9.7 km/h) • Weather: sunny
- Game attendance: 61,699
- Referee: Matt Loeffler
- TV announcers (ESPN): Joe Tessitore (play-by-play), Jesse Palmer (analyst), and Katie George (sideline reporter)
- Boxscore

Game information

First quarter

- Kentucky – Alex Raynor 24-yard field goal, 7:13
- Kentucky – Ray Davis 9-yard pass from Devin Leary (Alex Raynor kick), 5:37
- Kentucky – Ray Davis 75-yard run, 0:23

Second quarter

- Kentucky – Ray Davis 3-yard run (Alex Raynor kick), 8:54
- Florida – Hayden Hansen 4-yard pass from Graham Mertz (Trey Smack kick), 0:34

Third quarter

- Kentucky – Ray Davis 2-yard run (Alex Raynor kick), 10:54
- Florida – Ricky Pearsall 33-yard pass from Graham Mertz (Trey Smack kick), 7:17

Fourth quarter

- Kentucky – Alex Raynor 50-yard field goal, 7:44

Statistics	Florida	Kentucky
First downs	15	23
Plays–yards	59–313	56–398
Rushes–yards	29–69	36–329
Passing yards	244	69
Passing: comp–att–int	25–30–1	9–20–0
Turnovers		
Time of possession	31:14	28:46

Team	Category	Player	Statistics
Florida	Passing	Graham Mertz	25/30, 244 yards, 2 TD, 1 INT
Florida	Rushing	Montrell Johnson Jr.	10 carries, 42 yards
Florida	Receiving	Ricky Pearsall	3 receptions, 62 yards, 1 TD
Kentucky	Passing	Devin Leary	9/20, 69 yards, 1 TD
Kentucky	Rushing	Ray Davis	26 carries, 280 yards, 3 TD
Kentucky	Receiving	Barion Brown	4 receptions, 37 yards

=== Vanderbilt ===
Overall record	Previous meeting	Previous winner	Score
43–11–2	November 19, 2022	Vanderbilt	31–24

Game six – Vanderbilt Commodores (2–4) at Florida Gators (3–2) – Game summary

Quarter	1	2	3	4	Total
Vanderbilt	7	0	7	0	14
Florida	7	14	7	10	38

at Ben Hill Griffin Stadium • Gainesville, Florida

- Date: October 7
- Game time: 4:01 p.m. EDT
- Game weather: Sunny
- Game attendance: 89,432
- Referee: David Smith
- TV announcers (SECN): Dave Neal (play-by-play), Matt Stinchcomb (analyst), and Tori Petry (sideline reporter)
- Boxscore

Game information

First quarter

- Florida – Ricky Pearsall 14-yard run (Trey Smack kick), 9:05
- Vanderbilt – Will Sheppard 85-yard pass from Ken Seals (Jacob Borcila kick), 6:15

Second quarter

- Florida – Arlis Boardingham 2-yard pass from Graham Mertz (Trey Smack kick), 10:51
- Florida – Montrell Johnson Jr. 7-yard run (Trey Smack kick), 0:41

Third quarter

- Florida – Eugene Wilson III 9-yard pass from Graham Mertz (Trey Smack kick), 3:16
- Vanderbilt – Richie Hoskins 21-yard pass from Ken Seals (Jacob Borcila kick), 0:44

Fourth quarter

- Florida – Trey Smack 40-yard field goal, 12:12
- Vanderbilt – Arlis Boardingham 15-yard pass from Graham Mertz (Trey Smack kick), 7:19

Statistics	Vanderbilt	Florida
First downs	13	25
Plays–yards	53–340	71–495
Rushes–yards	19–64	30–215
Passing yards	276	280
Passing: comp–att–int	19–34–0	34–41–1
Turnovers		
Time of possession	23:02	36:58

Team	Category	Player	Statistics
Vanderbilt	Passing	Ken Seals	19/34, 276 yards, 2 TD
Vanderbilt	Rushing	Sedrick Alexander	8 carries, 27 yards
Vanderbilt	Receiving	Will Sheppard	3 receptions, 107 yards, 1 TD
Florida	Passing	Graham Mertz	30/36, 254 yards, 3 TD
Florida	Rushing	Montrell Johnson Jr.	18 carries, 135 yards, 1 TD
Florida	Receiving	Arlis Boardingham	7 receptions, 99 yards, 2 TD

=== South Carolina ===
Overall record	Previous meeting	Previous winner	Score
30–10–3	November 12, 2022	Florida	38–6

Game seven – Florida Gators (4–2) at South Carolina Gamecocks (2–3) – Game summary

Quarter	1	2	3	4	Total
Florida	10	14	3	14	41
South Carolina	14	7	3	15	39

at Williams–Brice Stadium • Columbia, South Carolina

- Date: October 14
- Game time: 3:35 p.m. EDT
- Game weather: Temperature: 77 °F (25 °C) • Wind: W at 12 miles per hour (19 km/h) • Weather: sunny
- Game attendance: 79,247
- Referee: Steve Marlowe
- TV announcers (SECN): Taylor Zarzour (play-by-play), Matt Stinchcomb (analyst), Alyssa Lang (sideline reporter)
- Boxscore

Game information

First quarter

- Florida – Trevor Etienne 3-yard run (Trey Smack kick), 10:47
- South Carolina – Trey Knox 6-yard pass from Spencer Rattler (Mitch Jeter kick), 7:49
- Florida – Trey Smack 48-yard field goal, 4:08
- South Carolina – Juju McDowell 17-yard run (Mitch Jeter kick), 2:02

Second quarter

- Florida – Trey Smack 44-yard field goal, 13:39
- Florida – Kahleil Jackson 7-yard pass from Graham Mertz (Hayden Hansen pass), 8:13
- South Carolina – Mario Anderson 20-yard pass from Spencer Rattler (Mitch Jeter kick), 4:57
- Florida – Trey Smack 28-yard field goal, 0:03

Third quarter

- South Carolina – Mitch Jeter 27-yard field goal, 10:26
- Florida – Trey Smack 54-yard field goal, 7:24

Fourth quarter

- South Carolina – Juju McDowell 3-yard pass from Spencer Rattler (Mitch Jeter kick), 14:55
- South Carolina – Joshua Simon 33-yard pass from Spencer Rattler, 9:11
- Florida – Arlis Boardingham 4-yard pass from Graham Mertz (Trey Smack kick), 4:40
- Florida – Ricky Pearsall 21-yard pass from Graham Mertz (Trey Smack kick), 0:47
- South Carolina – 0-yard safety

Statistics	Florida	South Carolina
First downs	28	23
Plays–yards	81–494	63–465
Rushes–yards	33–71	33–152
Passing yards	423	313
Passing: comp–att–int	30–48–0	23–30–1
Turnovers		
Time of possession	32:44	27:16

Team	Category	Player	Statistics
Florida	Passing	Graham Mertz	30/48, 423 yards, 3 TD
Florida	Rushing	Montrell Johnson Jr.	11 carries, 50 yards
Florida	Receiving	Ricky Pearsall	10 receptions, 166 yards, 1 TD
South Carolina	Passing	Spencer Rattler	23/30, 313 yards, 4 TD, 1 INT
South Carolina	Rushing	Mario Anderson	20 carries, 98 yards
South Carolina	Receiving	Xavier Legette	5 receptions, 110 yards

=== No. 1 Georgia ===
Overall record	Previous meeting	Previous winner	Score
44–54–2	October 29, 2022	Georgia	42–20

Game eight – No. 1 Georgia Bulldogs (7–0) vs. Florida Gators (5–2) – Game summary

Quarter	1	2	3	4	Total
No. 1 Georgia	10	16	10	7	43
Florida	7	0	0	13	20

at EverBank Stadium • Jacksonville, Florida

- Date: October 28
- Game time: 3:45 p.m. EDT
- Game weather: Sunny
- Game attendance: 76,251
- Referee: Matt Loeffler
- TV announcers (CBS): Brad Nessler (play-by-play), Gary Danielson (analyst), and Jenny Dell (sideline reporter)
- Boxscore

Game information

First quarter

- Florida – Eugene Wilson III 25-yard pass from Graham Mertz (Trey Smack kick), 11:19
- Georgia – Peyton Woodring 22-yard field goal, 6:16
- Georgia – Ladd McConkey 41-yard pass from Carson Beck (Peyton Woodring kick), 1:23

Second quarter

- Georgia – Daijun Edwards 20-yard run (Peyton Woodring kick), 13:25
- Georgia – Daijun Edwards 2-yard run (Peyton Woodring kick), 10:34
- Georgia – 0-yard safety

Third quarter

- Georgia – Peyton Woodring 32-yard field goal, 7:05
- Georgia – Dillon Bell 17-yard pass from Carson Beck (Peyton Woodring kick), 0:18

Fourth quarter

- Florida – Hayden Hansen 5-yard pass from Graham Mertz, 12:29
- Georgia – Kendall Milton 1 yard run (Peyton Woodring kick), 5:57
- Florida – Graham Mertz 1 yard run (Trey Smack kick), 1:20

Statistics	Georgia	Florida
First downs	23	16
Plays–yards	66–486	59–339
Rushes–yards	38–171	25–109
Passing yards	315	230
Passing: comp–att–int	19–28–0	25–34–0
Turnovers		
Time of possession	33:29	26:31

Team	Category	Player	Statistics
Georgia	Passing	Carson Beck	19/28, 315 yards, 2 TD
Georgia	Rushing	Daijun Edwards	16 carries, 95 yards, 2 TD
Georgia	Receiving	Ladd McConkey	6 receptions, 135 yards, 1 TD
Florida	Passing	Graham Mertz	25/34, 230 yards, 2 TD
Florida	Rushing	Montrell Johnson Jr.	9 carries, 82 yards
Florida	Receiving	Ricky Pearsall	6 receptions, 99 yards

=== Arkansas ===
Overall record	Previous meeting	Previous winner	Score
10–2	November 14, 2020	Florida	63–35

Game nine – Arkansas Razorbacks (2–6) at Florida Gators (5–3) – Game summary

Quarter	1	2	3	4	OT	Total
Arkansas	14	3	3	13	6	39
Florida	14	3	6	10	3	36

at Ben Hill Griffin Stadium • Gainesville, Florida

- Date: November 4
- Game time: 12:01 p.m. EDT
- Game weather: Temperature: 66 °F (19 °C) • Wind: N at 4 miles per hour (6.4 km/h) • Weather: sunny
- Game attendance: 89,782
- Referee: Lee Hedrick
- TV announcers (ESPN2): Roy Philpott (play-by-play), Roddy Jones (analyst), Taylor McGregor (sideline reporter)
- Boxscore

Game information

First quarter

- Arkansas – AJ Green 8-yard pass from KJ Jefferson (Cam Little kick), 12:06
- Arkansas – Jaylon Braxton 33-yard fumble recovery (Cam Little kick), 11:54
- Florida – Eugene Wilson III 19-yard pass from Graham Mertz (Trey Smack kick), 5:33
- Florida – Eugene Wilson III 6-yard pass from Graham Mertz (Trey Smack kick), 2:04

Second quarter

- Arkansas – Cam Little 37-yard field goal, 4:39
- Florida – Trey Smack 47-yard field goal, 0:29

Third quarter

- Arkansas – Cam Little 41-yard field goal, 10:34
- Florida – Ricky Pearsall 32-yard pass from Graham Mertz, 1:38

Fourth quarter

- Arkansas – Cam Little 22-yard field goal, 12:54
- Florida – Trey Smack 34-yard field goal, 7:58
- Arkansas – KJ Jefferson 25-yard run (Cam Little kick), 4:26
- Florida – Trevor Etienne 26-yard run (Trey Smack kick), 3:02
- Arkansas – Cam Little 49-yard field goal, 0:44

Overtime

- Florida – Trey Smack 39-yard field goal
- Arkansas – Tyrone Broden 4-yard pass from KJ Jefferson

Statistics	Arkansas	Florida
First downs	23	20
Plays–yards	78–481	70–394
Rushes–yards	47–226	28–112
Passing yards	255	282
Passing: comp–att–int	20–31–1	26–42–0
Turnovers		
Time of possession	29:46	30:14

Team	Category	Player	Statistics
Arkansas	Passing	KJ Jefferson	20/31, 255 yards, 2 TD, 1 INT
Arkansas	Rushing	Raheim Sanders	18 carries, 103 yards
Arkansas	Receiving	Andrew Armstrong	3 receptions, 103 yards
Florida	Passing	Graham Mertz	26/42, 282 yards, 3 TD
Florida	Rushing	Trevor Etienne	12 carries, 80 yards, 1 TD
Florida	Receiving	Eugene Wilson III	8 receptions, 90 yards, 2 TD

=== No. 19 LSU ===
Overall record	Previous meeting	Previous winner	Score
33–30–3	October 15, 2022	LSU	45–35

Game ten – Florida Gators (5–4) at No. 19 LSU Tigers (6–3) – Game summary

Quarter	1	2	3	4	Total
Florida	7	7	14	7	35
No. 19 LSU	7	10	21	14	52

at Tiger Stadium • Baton Rouge, Louisiana

- Date: November 11
- Game time: 6:39 p.m. CST
- Game weather: Temperature: 64 °F (18 °C) • Wind: NE at 5 miles per hour (8.0 km/h) • Weather: cloudy
- Game attendance: 102,321
- Referee: Steve Marlowe
- TV announcers (SECN): Tom Hart (play-by-play), Cole Cubelic (analyst), Alyssa Lang (sideline reporter)
- Boxscore

Game information

First quarter

- LSU – Josh Williams 1 yard run (Damian Ramos kick), 11:59
- Florida – Eugene Wilson III 9-yard pass from Graham Mertz (Trey Smack kick), 8:58

Second quarter

- LSU – Damian Ramos 28-yard field goal, 11:52
- LSU – Jayden Daniels 85-yard run (Damian Ramos kick), 8:21
- Florida – Trevor Etienne 7-yard run (Trey Smack kick), 4:30

Third quarter

- LSU – Kaleb Jackson 5-yard run (Damian Ramos kick), 11:05
- Florida – Trevor Etienne 21-yard run (Trey Smack kick), 9:37
- Florida – Graham Mertz 1 yard run (Trey Smack kick), 7:16
- LSU – Jayden Daniels 51-yard run (Damian Ramos kick), 6:09
- LSU – Noah Cain 6-yard pass from Jayden Daniels (Damian Ramos kick), 2:18

Fourth quarter

- Florida – Trevor Etienne 5-yard run (Trey Smack kick), 10:27
- LSU – Brian Thomas Jr. 37-yard pass from Jayden Daniels (Damian Ramos kick), 9:14
- LSU – Brian Thomas Jr. 7-yard pass from Jayden Daniels (Damian Ramos kick), 2:25

Statistics	Florida	LSU
First downs	27	25
Plays–yards	488	701
Rushes–yards	177	329
Passing yards	311	372
Passing: comp–att–int	23–38–0	17–26–0
Turnovers		
Time of possession	34:24	25:36

Team	Category	Player	Statistics
Florida	Passing	Graham Mertz	26/38, 311 yards, 1 TD
Florida	Rushing	Trevor Etienne	18 carries, 99 yards, 3 TD
Florida	Receiving	Ricky Pearsall	7 receptions, 103 yards
LSU	Passing	Jayden Daniels	17/26, 372 yards, 3 TD
LSU	Rushing	Jayden Daniels	12 carries, 234 yards, 2 TD
LSU	Receiving	Brian Thomas Jr.	6 receptions, 150 yards, 2 TD

=== No. 9 Missouri ===
Overall record	Previous meeting	Previous winner	Score
6–6	October 5, 2022	Florida	24–17

Game eleven – Florida Gators (5–5) at No. 9 Missouri Tigers (8–2) – Game summary

Quarter	1	2	3	4	Total
Florida	7	0	14	10	31
No. 9 Missouri	3	10	10	10	33

at Faurot Field • Columbia, Missouri

- Date: November 18
- Game time: 6:36 p.m. CST
- Game weather: Temperature: 49 °F (9 °C) • Wind: W at 4 miles per hour (6.4 km/h) • Weather: sunny
- Game attendance: 62,621
- Referee: Scott Walker
- TV announcers (ESPN): Joe Tessitore (play-by-play), Jesse Palmer (analyst), Katie George (sideline reporter)
- Boxscore

Game information

First quarter

- Missouri – Harrison Mevis 22-yard field goal, 10:33
- Florida – Eugene Wilson III 8-yard pass from Graham Mertz (Trey Smack kick), 7:49

Second quarter

- Missouri – Cody Schrader 42-yard run (Harrison Mevis kick), 14:29
- Missouri – Harrison Mevis 39-yard field goal, 1:21

Third quarter

- Florida – Trevor Etienne 37-yard pass from Graham Mertz (Trey Smack kick), 11:54
- Missouri – Brady Cook 1 yard run (Harrison Mevis kick), 8:53
- Florida – Ricky Pearsall 39-yard run (Trey Smack kick), 7:16
- Missouri – Harrison Mevis 24-yard field goal, 3:53

Fourth quarter

- Missouri – Theo Wease 77-yard pass from Brady Cook, 13:14
- Florida – Trevor Etienne 9-yard run (Trey Smack kick), 7:49
- Florida – Trey Smack 35-yard field goal, 1:36
- Missouri – Harrison Mevis 30-yard field goal, 0:05

Statistics	Florida	Missouri
First downs	23	21
Plays–yards	66–500	67–508
Rushes–yards	40–261	32–177
Passing yards	239	331
Passing: comp–att–int	18–26–1	20–35–0
Turnovers		
Time of possession	33:08	26:52

Team	Category	Player	Statistics
Florida	Passing	Graham Mertz	14/21, 183 yards, 2 TD, 1 INT
Florida	Rushing	Montrell Johnson Jr.	12 carries, 85 yards
Florida	Receiving	Ricky Pearsall	2 receptions, 72 yards
Missouri	Passing	Brady Cook	20/34, 331 yards, 1 TD
Missouri	Rushing	Cody Schrader	23 carries, 148 yards, 1 TD
Missouri	Receiving	Luther Burden III	9 receptions, 158 yards

=== No. 5 Florida State ===
Overall record	Previous meeting	Previous winner	Score
37–27–2	November 25, 2022	Florida State	45–38

Game twelve – No. 5 Florida State Seminoles (11–0) at Florida Gators (5–6) – Game summary

Quarter	1	2	3	4	Total
No. 5 Florida State	0	7	7	10	24
Florida	0	12	3	0	15

at Ben Hill Griffin Stadium • Gainesville, Florida

- Date: November 25
- Game time: 7:13 p.m. EST
- Game weather: Temperature: 61 °F (16 °C) • Weather: cloudy
- Game attendance: 90,341
- Referee: Jeff Heaser
- TV announcers (ESPN): Chris Fowler (play-by-play), Kirk Herbstreit (analyst), and Holly Rowe (sideline reporter)
- Boxscore

Game information

Second quarter

- Florida – Montrell Johnson Jr. 5-yard run (Trey Smack kick), 14:31
- Florida – Trey Smack 35-yard field goal, 10:21
- Florida – 0-yard safety, 5:08
- Florida State – Trey Benson 1 yard run (Ryan Fitzgerald kick), 0:26

Third quarter

- Florida State – Trey Benson 36-yard run (Ryan Fitzgerald kick), 12:31
- Florida – Trey Smack 37-yard field goal, 5:58

Fourth quarter

- Florida State – Ryan Fitzgerald 17-yard field goal, 7:17
- Florida State – Trey Benson 26-yard run (Ryan Fitzgerald kick), 2:48

Statistics	Florida State	Florida
First downs	16	13
Plays–yards	57–224	60–232
Rushes–yards	31–90	44–146
Passing yards	134	86
Passing: comp–att–int	12–26–0	9–16–1
Turnovers		
Time of possession	25:08	34:52

Team	Category	Player	Statistics
Florida State	Passing	Tate Rodemaker	12/25, 134 yards
Florida State	Rushing	Trey Benson	19 carries, 95 yards, 3 TD
Florida State	Receiving	Johnny Wilson	6 receptions, 64 yards
Florida	Passing	Max Brown	9/16, 86 yards, 1 INT
Florida	Rushing	Montrell Johnson Jr.	18 carries, 107 yards, 1 TD
Florida	Receiving	Eugene Wilson III	3 receptions, 36 yards

== Personnel ==
=== Roster ===
As of August 24, 2023

2023 Florida Gators Roster
Quarterbacks: 10 Jack Miller III – (redshirt) Sophomore; 12 Micah Leon – Graduate; 14 Parker Leise – Freshman; 15 Graham Mertz – (redshirt) Junior; 17 Max Brown – (redshirt) Freshman; Running backs: 2 Montrell Johnson Jr. – Junior; 7 Trevor Etienne – Sophomore; 20 Treyaun Webb – Freshman; 24 Ja'Kobi Jackson – Junior; 25 Anthony Rubio – Freshman; 27 Cam Carroll – (redshirt) Senior; 28 Eddie Battle – (redshirt) Senior; 38 Carlson Joseph – (redshirt) Sophomore; Wide receivers: 0 Ja'Quavion Fraziars – Junior; 1 Ricky Pearsall – Senior; 3 Eugene Wilson III – Freshman; 4 Caleb Douglas – Sophomore; 6 Andy Jean – Freshman; 11 Aidan Mizell – Freshman; 16 Thai Chiaokhiao-Bowman – Sophomore; 19 Alex Gonzalez – (redshirt) Freshman; 22 Kahleil Jackson – (redshirt) Sophomore; 30 Taylor Spierto – (redshirt) Sophomore; 33 Daniel Cross – (redshirt) Senior; 80 Zak Sedaros – (redshirt) Freshman; 83 Jackson Wade – Freshman; 84 Brian Green Jr. – Freshman; 88 Marcus Burke – (redshirt) Sophomore; Tight ends: 8 Arlis Boardingham – (redshirt) Freshman; 9 Keon Zipperer – Senior; 18 Dante Zanders – (redshirt) Senior; 34 Andrew Savaiinaea – (redshirt) Freshman; 85 Scott Isacks – (redshirt) Freshman; 86 Tony Livingston – Freshman; 87 Jonathan Odom – Junior; 89 Hayden Hansen – (redshirt) Freshman; Offensive line: 52 Jalen Farmer – (redshirt) Freshman; 53 Bryce Lovett – Freshman; 54 Micah Mazzccua – Junior; 56 Christian Williams – (redshirt) Freshman; 58 Austin Barber – (redshirt) Sophomore; 59 Hayden Clem – (redshirt) Sophomore; 63 Caden Jones – Freshman; 64 Riley Simonds – (redshirt) Junior; 65 Kingsley Eguakun – (redshirt) Junior; 66 Jake Slaughter – (redshirt) Sophomore; 67 Richie Leonard IV – Junior; 71 Roderick Kearney – Freshman; 72 Bryan Rosenberg – Freshman; 73 Mark Pitts – (redshirt) Sophomore; 74 Lyndell Hudson II – (redshirt) Senior; 75 Kamryn Waites – (redshirt) Sophomore; 76 Damieon George Jr. – (redshirt) Sophomore; 77 Knijeah Harris – Freshman; 79 Jordan Herman – (redshirt) Sophomore	Defensive line: 7 Chris McClellan – Sophomore; 9 Will Norman – Freshman; 21 Desmond Watson – Junior; 61 Nicolas Flynn – (redshirt) Freshman; 66 Jaelin Humphries – (redshirt) Junior; 88 Caleb Banks – (redshirt) Freshman; 90 Connor Homa – Freshman; 91 Tyreik Norwood – (redshirt) Senior; 92 Sebastian Scott – Freshman; 93 Keenan Landry – (redshirt) Sophomore; 94 Tyreak Sapp – (redshirt) Sophomore; 95 Jamari Lyons – (redshirt) Freshman; 96 Gavin Hill – Freshman; 97 Andre Morris – Freshman; 99 Cam Jackson – Junior; Edge rushers: 1 Princely Umanmielen – Junior; 11 Kelby Collins – Freshman; 12 Justus Boone – (redshirt) Sophomore; 19 T.J. Searcy – Freshman; 24 Kamran James – Freshman; 36 Bryce Capers – (redshirt) Freshman; 44 Jack Pyburn – Sophomore; 45 Layne Swafford – Freshman; 48 Quincy Ivory – Sophomore; Inside linebackers: 6 Shemar James – Sophomore; 15 Derek Wingo – Junior; 17 Scooby Williams – (redshirt) Sophomore; 20 Teradja Mitchell – (redshirt) Senior; 22 Deuce Spurlock II – (redshirt) Freshman; 29 Jaden Robinson – Freshman; 34 Mannie Nunnery – (redshirt) Junior; 42 Kenny Anyaehie – (redshirt) Senior; 47 Justin Pelic – (redshirt) Junior; Cornerbacks: 0 Sharif Denson – Freshman; 2 Ja'Keem Jackson – Freshman; 3 Jason Marshall Jr. – Junior; 8 Jalen Kimber – (redshirt) Junior; 13 Aaron Gates – Freshman; 23 Jaydon Hill – (redshirt) Junior; 25 Ethan Pouncey – (redshirt) Sophomore; 26 Dijon Johnson – Freshman; 28 Devin Moore – Sophomore; 37 Javion Toombs – (redshirt) Freshman; 38 Sebastian Vargas – Sophomore; Safeties: 5 Kamari Wilson – Sophomore; 10 Miguel Mitchell – Sophomore; 14 Jordan Castell – Freshman; 16 R.J. Moten – Junior; 18 Bryce Thornton – Freshman; 27 Jadarrius Perkins – Senior; 31 Ahman Covington – Freshman; 32 Cahron Rackley – (redshirt) Sophomore; 35 Dakota Mitchell – (redshirt) Sophomore; 39 Brayden Slade – Freshman; 82 Ja'Markis Weston – (redshirt) Junior	Kickers: 29 Trey Smack – Sophomore; 49 Adam Mihalek – (redshirt) Sophomore; Punters: 26 Jeremy Crawshaw – Junior; 40 Jacob Watkins – (redshirt) Senior; 41 Ara Emerzian – Senior; Long snappers: 42 Rocco Underwood – (redshirt) Sophomore; 48 Gannon Burt – Freshman
Redshirt | Injury

=== Coaching staff ===
Name	Position	Joined staff
Billy Napier	Head coach	2022
Rob Sale	Offensive coordinator / offensive line	2022
Austin Armstrong	Defensive coordinator	2023
Sean Spencer	Co-defensive coordinator / defensive line	2022
Jabbar Juluke	Associate head coach (offense) / running backs	2022
Corey Raymond	Assistant head coach / secondary	2022
Jay Bateman	Inside linebackers	2022
Russ Callaway	Tight ends	2022
Billy Gonzales	Wide receivers	2023
Mike Peterson	Edge	2022
Darnell Stapleton	Offensive line	2022
Mark Hocke	Associate head coach / director of strength and conditioning	2022

== Players drafted into the NFL ==
Round	Pick	Player	Position	NFL Club
1	31	Ricky Pearsall	WR	San Francisco 49ers
