= 2023 Mississippi State Bulldogs football team =

American college football season

2023 Mississippi State Bulldogs football
- Conference: Southeastern Conference
- Western Division
- Record: 5–7 (1–7 SEC)
- Head coach: Zach Arnett (1st season; first 10 games); Greg Knox (interim; remainder of season)
- Offensive coordinator: Kevin Barbay (1st season)
- Offensive scheme: Pro-style
- Defensive coordinator: Matt Brock (1st season)
- Base defense: 3–3–5
- Home stadium: Davis Wade Stadium

2023 Southeastern Conference football standings
	Conf.			Overall
Team	W		L	W		L
Eastern Division
No. 4 Georgia xy	8	–	0	13	–	1
No. 8 Missouri	6	–	2	11	–	2
No. 17 Tennessee	4	–	4	9	–	4
Kentucky	3	–	5	7	–	6
Florida	3	–	5	5	–	7
South Carolina	3	–	5	5	–	7
Vanderbilt	0	–	8	2	–	10
Western Division
No. 5 Alabama xy$^	8	–	0	12	–	2
No. 9 Ole Miss	6	–	2	11	–	2
No. 12 LSU	6	–	2	10	–	3
Texas A&M	4	–	4	7	–	6
Auburn	3	–	5	6	–	7
Mississippi State	1	–	7	5	–	7
Arkansas	1	–	7	4	–	8
Championship: Alabama 27, Georgia 24
^ – College Football Playoff participant; $ – Conference champion; x – Division champion/co-champions; y – Championship game participant; Rankings from AP Poll

The 2023 Mississippi State Bulldogs football team represented Mississippi State University in the Western Division of the Southeastern Conference (SEC) during the 2023 NCAA Division I FBS football season. The Bulldogs were led by Zach Arnett, who was promoted from defensive coordinator to head coach in December 2022 following the death of Mike Leach, until his firing on November 13, 2023.

The Mississippi State football team played its home games at Davis Wade Stadium in Starkville, Mississippi. This was also the final year for the West division as Texas and Oklahoma joined the SEC in 2024.

== Schedule ==
Mississippi State and the SEC announced the 2023 football schedule on September 20, 2022. The 2023 Bulldogs' schedule consists of 8 home games and 4 away games for the regular season. Mississippi State will host four SEC conference opponents Alabama (rivalry), Kentucky, LSU (rivalry) and Ole Miss (Egg Bowl) at home and will travel to four SEC opponents, Arkansas, Auburn, South Carolina and Texas A&M to close out the SEC regular season on the road. Mississippi State is not scheduled to play SEC East opponents Florida, Georgia, Missouri, Tennessee and Vanderbilt in the 2023 regular season. The Bulldogs' bye week comes during week 7 (on October 14, 2023).

Mississippi State out of conference opponents represent the MAC, Pac-12, SLC and the Sun Belt conferences. The Bulldogs will host all four non–conference games which are against Arizona from the Pac-12, Southeastern Louisiana from the SLC (FCS), Southern Miss from the Sunbelt and Western Michigan from the MAC.

Date	Time	Opponent	Site	TV	Result	Attendance
September 2	3:00 p.m.	No. 15 (FCS) Southeastern Louisiana*	Davis Wade Stadium; Starkville, MS	SECN	W 48–7	50,041
September 9	6:30 p.m.	Arizona*	Davis Wade Stadium; Starkville, MS	SECN	W 31–24 ^{OT}	51,648
September 16	11:00 a.m.	No. 14 LSU	Davis Wade Stadium; Starkville, MS (rivalry/SEC Nation)	ESPN	L 14–41	60,084
September 23	6:30 p.m.	at South Carolina	Williams–Brice Stadium; Columbia, SC	SECN	L 30–37	78,311
September 30	8:00 p.m.	No. 12 Alabama	Davis Wade Stadium; Starkville, MS (rivalry)	ESPN	L 17–40	60,111
October 7	11:00 a.m.	Western Michigan*	Davis Wade Stadium; Starkville, MS	SECN	W 41–28	47,158
October 21	11:00 a.m.	at Arkansas	Donald W. Reynolds Razorback Stadium; Fayetteville, AR	ESPN	W 7–3	71,505
October 28	2:30 p.m.	at Auburn	Jordan–Hare Stadium; Auburn, AL	SECN	L 13–27	88,043
November 4	6:30 p.m.	Kentucky^{†}	Davis Wade Stadium; Starkville, MS	SECN	L 3–24	52,329
November 11	6:30 p.m.	at Texas A&M	Kyle Field; College Station, TX	ESPN2	L 10–51	103,266
November 18	11:00 a.m.	Southern Miss*	Davis Wade Stadium; Starkville, MS	SECN+/ESPN+	W 41–20	53,855
November 23	6:30 p.m.	No. 12 Ole Miss	Davis Wade Stadium; Starkville, MS (Egg Bowl)	ESPN	L 7–17	60,412
*Non-conference game; ^{†}Homecoming; Rankings from AP Poll (and CFP Rankings, after November 1) – Released prior to game; All times are in Central time

== Game summaries ==
=== vs No. 15 Southeastern Louisiana ===
Game One – No. 15 Southeastern Louisiana Lions (FCS) (0–0) vs. Mississippi State Bulldogs (0–0) – Game summary

Quarter	1	2	3	4	Total
No. 15 Southeastern Louisiana (FCS)	0	7	0	0	7
Mississippi State	3	17	7	21	48

at Davis Wade Stadium • Starkville, Mississippi

- Date: Saturday, September 2, 2023
- Game time: 3:00 p.m. CDT
- Game weather: Cloudy • Temperature: 78 °F (26 °C) • Wind: SE 8 mph
- Game attendance: 50,041
- Referee: Steve Marlowe
- TV announcers (SECN): Taylor Zarzour (play-by-play), Matt Stinchcomb (analyst), Alyssa Lang (sideline)

Game information

First quarter

- (4:02) MSST – Kyle Ferrie 47-yard field goal (Drive: 12 plays, 56 yards, 5:07; Mississippi State 3–0)

Second quarter

- (13:46) MSST – Jo'quavious Marks 1-yard run (Kyle Ferrie kick) (Drive: 3 plays, 36 yards, 1:06; Mississippi State 10–0)
- (5:32) SELA – Jacob Logan 2-yard pass from Zachary Clement (Riley Callaghan kick) (Drive: 16 plays, 79 yards, 8:09; Mississippi State 10–7)
- (1:29) MSST – Creed Whittemore 33-yard pass from Will Rogers (Kyle Ferrie kick) (Drive: 10 plays, 75 yards, 4:03; Mississippi State 17–7)
- (0:00) MSST – Kyle Ferrie 49-yard field goal (Drive: 6 plays, 29 yards, 0:44; Mississippi State 20–7)

Third quarter

- (1:30) MSST – Jaden Walley 5-yard pass from Will Rogers (Kyle Ferrie kick) (Drive: 6 plays, 82 yards, 3:29; Mississippi State 27–7)

Fourth quarter

- (14:53) MSST – Avery Sledge 11-yard punt return (Kyle Ferrie kick) (Mississippi State 34–7)
- (9:20) MSST – Jo'Quavious Marks 6-yard run (Kyle Ferrie kick) (Drive: 6 plays, 85 yards, 3:05; Mississippi State 41–7)
- (5:19) MSST – Creed Whittemore 53-yard run (Kyle Ferrie kick) (Drive: 4 plays, 72 yards, 2:10; Mississippi State 48–7)

Statistics	SELA	MSST
First downs	10	23
Total yards	54–208	68–525
Rushing yards	26–83	39–298
Passing yards	125	227
Passing: Comp–Att–Int	16–28–0	20–29–0
Time of possession	28:58	31:02

Team	Category	Player	Statistics
Southeastern Louisiana	Passing	Eli Sawyer	11/19, 85 yards
Southeastern Louisiana	Rushing	Harlan Dixon	8 carries, 51 yards
Southeastern Louisiana	Receiving	Harlan Dixon	4 receptions, 42 yards
Mississippi State	Passing	Will Rogers	20/29, 227 yards, 2 TD
Mississippi State	Rushing	Jo'Quavious Marks	19 carries, 127 yards, 2 TD
Mississippi State	Receiving	Creed Whittemore	4 receptions, 59 yards, TD

=== vs Arizona ===
Game Two – Arizona Wildcats (1–0) at Mississippi State Bulldogs (1–0) – Game summary

Quarter	1	2	3	4	OT	Total
Arizona	0	7	7	10	0	24
Mississippi State	14	0	7	3	7	31

at Davis Wade Stadium • Starkville, MS

- Date: Saturday, September 9, 2023
- Game time: 6:30 p.m. CST
- Game weather: Sunny, 82 °F (28 °C)
- Game attendance: 51,648
- Referee: John Love
- TV announcers (SEC Network): Tom Hart (play-by-play), Jordan Rodgers (analyst), Cole Cubelic (sideline)

Game information

First quarter

- (5:06) MSST – Lideatrick Griffin 23-yard pass from Will Rogers (Kyle Ferrie kick) (Drive: 4 plays, 50 yards, 1:53; Mississippi State 7–0)
- (3:27) MSST – Jo'Quavious Marks 1-yard run (Kyle Ferrie kick) (Drive: 2 plays, 6 yards, 0:22; Mississippi State 14–0)

Second quarter

- (0:02) ARIZ – Jayden de Laura 1-yard run (Tyler Loop kick) (Drive: 3 plays, 77 yards, 0:38; Mississippi State 14–7)

Third quarter

- (11:07) MSST – Lideatrick Griffin 15-yard pass from Will Rogers (Kyle Ferrie kick) (Drive: 4 plays, 30 yards, 2:06; Mississippi State 21–7)
- (6:34) ARIZ – Jacob Cowing 17-yard pass from Jayden de Laura (Tyler Loop kick) (Drive: 10 plays, 75 yards, 4:33; Mississippi State 21–14)

Fourth quarter

- (9:14) ARIZ – Tetairoa McMillan 11-yard pass from Jayden de Laura (Tyler Loop kick) (Drive: 9 plays, 80 yards, 3:40; Tied 21–21)
- (6:47) MSST – Kyle Ferrie 36-yard field goal (Drive: 5 plays, 57 yards, 2:27; Mississippi State 24–21)
- (0:05) ARIZ – Tyler Loop 36-yard field goal (Drive: 5 plays, 57 yards, 2:31; Tied 24–24)

First overtime

- (0:00) MSST – Jeffery Pittman 29-yard pass from Will Rogers (Kyle Ferrie kick) (Drive: 2 plays, 25 yards, 0:00; Mississippi State 31–24)

Statistics	ARIZ	MSST
First downs	23	16
Total yards	72–431	56–307
Rushing yards	25–91	38–145
Passing yards	340	162
Passing: Comp–Att–Int	33–47–4	13–17–0
Time of possession	32:22	27:38

Team	Category	Player	Statistics
Arizona	Passing	Jayden de Laura	32/46, 342 yards, 2 TD, 4 INT
Arizona	Rushing	Jayden de Laura	8 carries, 44 yards, TD
Arizona	Receiving	Tetairoa McMillan	8 receptions, 161 yards, TD
Mississippi State	Passing	Will Rogers	13/17, 162 yards, 3 TD
Mississippi State	Rushing	Jo'Quavious Marks	24 carries, 123 yards, TD
Mississippi State	Receiving	Lideatrick Griffin	5 receptions, 83 yards, 2 TD

=== vs No. 14 LSU ===
Game Three – No. 14 LSU Tigers (1–1) at Mississippi State Bulldogs (2–0) – Game summary

Quarter	1	2	3	4	Total
No. 14 LSU	10	14	10	7	41
Mississippi State	0	7	0	7	14

at Davis Wade Stadium • Starkville, MS

- Date: Saturday, September 16, 2023
- Game time: 11:00 a.m. CST
- Game weather: Sunny, 81 °F (27 °C)
- Game attendance: 60,084
- Referee: Jason Autrey
- TV announcers (ESPN): Joe Tessitore (play-by-play), Jesse Palmer (analyst), Katie George (sideline)

Game information

First quarter

- (6:36) LSU – Damian Ramos 22-yard field goal (Drive: 14 plays, 77 yards, 7:12; LSU 3–0)
- (3:38) LSU – Malik Nabers 26-yard pass from Jayden Daniels (Damian Ramos kick) (Drive: 4 plays, 70 yards, 1:50; LSU 10–0)

Second quarter

- (14:11) LSU – Malik Nabers 33-yard pass from Jayden Daniels (Damian Ramos kick) (Drive: 8 plays, 63 yards, 3:13; LSU 17–0)
- (3:24) LSU – Josh Williams 1-yard run (Damian Ramos kick) (Drive: 6 plays, 66 yards, 2:45; LSU 24–0)
- (0:50) MSST – Lideatrick Griffin 9-yard run (Kyle Ferrie kick) (Drive: 6 plays, 72 yards, 2:34; LSU 24–7)

Third quarter

- (10:41) LSU – Damian Ramos 41-yard field goal (Drive: 11 plays, 53 yards, 4:19; LSU 27–7)
- (3:27) LSU – Jayden Daniels 5-yard run (Damian Ramos kick) (Drive: 5 plays, 62 yards, 2:31; LSU 34–7)

Fourth quarter

- (12:11) LSU – Jayden Daniels 1-yard run (Damian Ramos kick) (Drive: 12 plays, 75 yards, 5:08; LSU 41–7)
- (4:26) MSST – Antonio Harmon 4-yard pass from Mike Wright (Kyle Ferrie kick) (Drive: 10 plays, 58 yards, 4:19; LSU 41–14)

Statistics	LSU	MSST
First downs	26	10
Total yards	76–530	50–201
Rushing yards	39–163	21–94
Passing yards	367	107
Passing: Comp–Att–Int	31–37–0	12–29–0
Time of possession	38:39	21:21

Team	Category	Player	Statistics
LSU	Passing	Jayden Daniels	30/34, 361 yards, 2 TD
LSU	Rushing	Jayden Daniels	15 carries, 64 yards, 2 TD
LSU	Receiving	Malik Nabers	13 receptions, 239 yards, 2 TD
Mississippi State	Passing	Will Rogers	11/28, 103 yards
Mississippi State	Rushing	Jo'Quavious Marks	8 carries, 75 yards
Mississippi State	Receiving	Zavion Thomas	3 receptions, 52 yards

=== at South Carolina ===
Game Four – Mississippi State Bulldogs (2–1) at South Carolina Gamecocks (1–2) – Game summary

Quarter	1	2	3	4	Total
Mississippi State	0	17	10	3	30
South Carolina	7	13	7	10	37

at Williams-Brice Stadium • Columbia, South Carolina

- Date: Saturday, September 23, 2023
- Game time: 7:30 p.m. EST
- Game weather: Sunny, 80 °F (27 °C)
- Game attendance: 78,311
- Referee: Matt Loeffler
- TV announcers (SECN): Tom Hart (play-by-play), Jordan Rodgers (analyst), Cole Cubelic (sideline)

Game information

First quarter

- (9:46) SC – Xavier Legette 76-yard pass from Spencer Rattler (Mitch Jeter kick) (Drive: 6 plays, 98 yards, 2:18; South Carolina 7–0)

Second quarter

- (14:53) SC – Trey Knox 17-yard pass from Spencer Rattler (Mitch Jeter kick) (Drive: 16 plays, 99 yards, 7:15; South Carolina 14–0)
- (14:39) MSST – Lideatrick Griffin 65-yard pass from Will Rogers (Kyle Ferrie kick) (Drive: 2 plays, 65 yards, 0:14; South Carolina 14–7)
- (7:02) MSST – Jo'Quavious Marks 7-yard run (Kyle Ferrie kick) (Drive: 3 plays, 68 yards, 1:05; Tied 14–14)
- (0:38) SC – Dakereon Joyner 3-yard run (pass failed) (Drive: 13 plays, 75 yards, 6:24; South Carolina 20–14)
- (0:00) MSST – Kyle Ferrie 49-yard field goal (Drive: 6 plays, 44 yards, 0:38; South Carolina 20–17)

Third quarter

- (14:50) SC – Xavier Legette 75-yard pass from Spencer Rattler (Mitch Jeter kick) (Drive: 1 play, 75 yards, 0:10; South Carolina 27–17)
- (10:26) MSST – Mike Wright 1-yard run (Kyle Ferrie kick) (Drive: 9 plays, 75 yards, 4:24; South Carolina 27–24)
- (2:00) MSST – Kyle Ferrie 23-yard field goal (Drive: 9 plays, 39 yards, 5:12; Tied 27–27)

Fourth quarter

- (12:35) SC – Mitch Jeter 35-yard field goal (Drive: 10 plays, 58 yards, 4:25; South Carolina 30–27)
- (9:36) SC – Mario Anderson 9-yard run (Mitch Jeter kick) (Drive: 4 plays, 22 yards, 1:43; South Carolina 37–27)
- (2:13) MSST – Kyle Ferrie 47-yard field goal (Drive: 13 plays, 68 yards, 2:42; South Carolina 37–30)

Statistics	MSST	SC
First downs	20	19
Total yards	71–519	67–432
Rushing yards	23–32	47–144
Passing yards	487	288
Passing: Comp–Att–Int	30–48–1	18–20–0
Time of possession	28:18	31:42

Team	Category	Player	Statistics
Mississippi State	Passing	Will Rogers	30/48, 487 yards, TD, INT
Mississippi State	Rushing	Jo'Quavious Marks	12 carries, 27 yards, TD
Mississippi State	Receiving	Lideatrick Griffin	7 receptions, 256 yards, TD
South Carolina	Passing	Spencer Rattler	18/20, 288 yards, 3 TD
South Carolina	Rushing	Mario Anderson	26 carries, 88 yards, TD
South Carolina	Receiving	Xavier Legette	5 receptions, 189 yards, 2 TD

=== vs No. 12 Alabama (rivalry) ===
Game Five – No. 12 Alabama Crimson Tide (3–1) at Mississippi State Bulldogs (2–2) – Game summary

Quarter	1	2	3	4	Total
No. 12 Alabama	14	17	3	6	40
Mississippi State	0	10	7	0	17

at Davis Wade Stadium • Starkville, MS

- Date: Saturday, September 30, 2023
- Game time: 8:00 p.m. CST
- Game weather: Clear, 74 °F (23 °C) Wind NE @ 1 mph
- Game attendance: 60,111
- Referee: Ken Williamson
- TV announcers (ESPN): Mark Jones (play-by-play), Rod Gilmore (analyst), Quint Kessenich (sideline)

Game information

First quarter

- (4:48) ALA – Jalen Milroe 53-yard run (Will Reichard kick) (Drive: 3 plays, 70 yards, 1:21; Alabama 7–0)
- (3:51) ALA – Chris Braswell 28-yard interception return (Will Reichard kick) (Alabama 14–0)

Second quarter

- (12:44) MSST – Kyle Ferrie 31-yard field goal (Drive: 12 plays, 62 yards, 6:07; Alabama 14–3)
- (10:07) ALA – Will Reichard 48-yard field goal (Drive: 6 plays, 46 yards, 2:37; Alabama 17–3)
- (6:26) MSST – Mike Wright 15-yard run (Kyle Ferrie kick) (Drive: 9 plays, 64 yards, 3:41; Alabama 17–10)
- (1:07) ALA – Jase McClellan 2-yard run (Will Reichard kick) (Drive: 12 plays, 75 yards, 5:19; Alabama 24–10)
- (0:31) ALA – Jalen Milroe 10-yard run (Will Reichard kick) (Drive: 3 plays, 31 yards, 0:26; Alabama 31–10)

Third quarter

- (9:11) MSST – Jeffrey Pittman 1-yard pass from Will Rogers (Kyle Ferrie kick) (Drive: 11 plays, 75 yards, 5:49; Alabama 31–17)
- (2:50) ALA – Will Reichard 38-yard field goal (Drive: 12 plays, 54 yards, 6:21; Alabama 34–17)

Fourth quarter

- (9:04) ALA – Will Reichard 34-yard field goal (Drive: 6 plays, 18 yards, 3:29; Alabama 37–17)
- (6:08) ALA – Will Reichard 48-yard field goal (Drive: 4 plays, 4 yards, 1:30; Alabama 40–17)

Statistics	ALA	MSST
First downs	17	15
Total yards	56–357	62–261
Rushing yards	43–193	35–154
Passing yards	164	107
Passing: Comp–Att–Int	10–13–0	15–27–3
Time of possession	30:10	29:50

Team	Category	Player	Statistics
Alabama	Passing	Jalen Milroe	10/12, 164 yards
Alabama	Rushing	Jalen Milroe	11 carries, 69 yards, 2 TD
Alabama	Receiving	Amari Niblack	3 receptions, 61 yards
Mississippi State	Passing	Will Rogers	15/27, 107 yards, TD, 3 INT
Mississippi State	Rushing	Jo'Quavious Marks	9 carries, 68 yards
Mississippi State	Receiving	Jeffery Pittman	2 receptions, 23 yards, TD

=== vs Western Michigan ===
Game Six – Western Michigan Broncos (2–3) at Mississippi State Bulldogs (2–3) – Game summary

Quarter	1	2	3	4	Total
Western Michigan	0	7	14	7	28
Mississippi State	10	7	14	10	41

at Davis Wade Stadium • Starkville, MS

- Date: Saturday, October 7, 2023
- Game time: 11:00 a.m. CST
- Game weather: Sunny, 62 °F (17 °C)
- Game attendance: 47,158
- Referee: Scott Walker
- TV announcers (SECN/ESPN+): Lowell Galindo (play-by-play), Derek Mason (analyst), Taylor Davis (sideline)

Game information

First quarter

- (10:09) MSST – Kyle Ferrie 31-yard field goal (Drive: 7 plays, 34 yards, 2:45; Mississippi State 3–0)
- (6:04) MSST – Jordan Mosley 15-yard pass from Will Rogers (Kyle Ferrie kick) (Drive: 5 plays, 54 yards, 2:30; Mississippi State 10–0)

Second quarter

- (4:03) MSST – Creed Whittemore 16-yard pass from Will Rogers (Kyle Ferrie kick) (Drive: 6 plays, 53 yards, 3:03; Mississippi State 17–0)
- (0:52) WMU – Austin Hence 10-yard pass from Hayden Wolff (Palmer Dornschke kick) (Drive: 14 plays, 75 yards, 3:11; Mississippi State 17–7)

Third quarter

- (12:18) MSST – Mike Wright 3-yard run (Kyle Ferrie kick) (Drive: 7 plays, 61 yards, 2:41; Mississippi State 24–7)
- (8:57) WMU – Blake Bosma 23-yard pass from Hayden Wolff (Palmer Dornschke kick) (Drive: 10 plays, 75 yards, 3:21; Mississippi State 24–14)
- (6:44) MSST – Seth Davis 5-yard run (Nick Barr-Mira kick) (Drive: 5 plays, 51 yards, 2:12; Mississippi State 31–14)
- (3:23) WMU – Zahir Abdus-Salaam 11-yard run (Palmer Dornschke kick) (Drive: 9 plays, 75 yards, 3:21; Mississippi State 31–21)

Fourth quarter

- (12:31) MSST – Freddie Roberson 36-yard pass from Will Rogers (Nick Barr-Mira kick) (Drive: 5 plays, 59 yards, 1:44; Mississippi State 38–21)
- (10:48) WMU – Leroy Thomas 25-yard pass from Hayden Wolff (Palmer Dornschke kick) (Drive: 5 plays, 75 yards, 1:43; Mississippi State 38–28)
- (4:12) MSST – Nick Barr-Mira 49-yard field goal (Drive: 6 plays, 26 yards, 2:07; Mississippi State 41–28)

Statistics	WMU	MSST
First downs	21	25
Total yards	77–413	65–440
Rushing yards	32–116	33–194
Passing yards	297	246
Passing: Comp–Att–Int	33–45–1	23–32–0
Time of possession	28:46	31:14

Team	Category	Player	Statistics
Western Michigan	Passing	Hayden Wolff	27/35, 262 yards, 3 TD, INT
Western Michigan	Rushing	Zahir Abdus-Salaam	18 carries, 60 yards, TD
Western Michigan	Receiving	Kenneth Womack	12 receptions, 113 yards
Mississippi State	Passing	Will Rogers	16/22, 189 yards, 3 TD
Mississippi State	Rushing	Seth Davis	10 carries, 65 yards, TD
Mississippi State	Receiving	Freddie Roberson	5 receptions, 68 yards, TD

=== at Arkansas ===
Game Seven – Mississippi State Bulldogs (3–3) at Arkansas Razorbacks (2–5) – Game summary

Quarter	1	2	3	4	Total
Mississippi State	0	7	0	0	7
Arkansas	3	0	0	0	3

at Donald W. Reynolds Razorback Stadium • Fayetteville, Arkansas

- Date: Saturday, October 21, 2023
- Game time: 11:00 a.m. CST
- Game weather: –
- Game attendance: 71,505
- Referee: –
- TV announcers (ESPN): TBD

Game information

First quarter

Second quarter

Third quarter

Fourth quarter

Statistics	MSST	ARK
First downs	10	12
Total yards	205	200
Rushing yards	120	103
Passing yards	85	97
Passing: Comp–Att–Int	8–12–1	19–31–1
Time of possession	28:35	31:25

Team	Category	Player	Statistics
Mississippi State	Passing	Mike Wright	8/12, 85 yards, TD, INT
Mississippi State	Rushing	Mike Wright	11 carries, 60 yards
Mississippi State	Receiving	Justin Robinson	2 receptions, 40 yards
Arkansas	Passing	KJ Jefferson	19/31, 97 yards, INT
Arkansas	Rushing	Rashod Dubinion	14 carries, 47 yards
Arkansas	Receiving	Andrew Armstrong	4 receptions, 35 yards

=== at Auburn ===
Game Eight – Mississippi State Bulldogs (4–3) at Auburn Tigers (3–4) – Game summary

Quarter	1	2	3	4	Total
Mississippi State	3	0	3	7	13
Auburn	14	10	3	0	27

at Jordan–Hare Stadium • Auburn, Alabama

- Date: Saturday, October 28, 2023
- Game time: 2:35 p.m. CDT
- Game weather: Sunny • Temperature: 80 °F (27 °C) • Wind: SE 5 mph
- Game attendance: 88,043
- Referee: Daniel Gautreaux
- TV announcers (SEC Network): Dave Neal (play-by-play), Derek Mason (analyst), Taylor Davis (sideline reporter)

Game information

First quarter

Second quarter

Third quarter

Fourth quarter

Statistics	MSST	AUB
First downs	19	21
Total yards	345	416
Rushing yards	184	186
Passing yards	161	230
Passing: Comp–Att–Int	16–32–1	20–26–0
Time of possession	30:44	29:16

Team	Category	Player	Statistics
Mississippi State	Passing	Mike Wright	16/32, 161 yards, TD, INT
Mississippi State	Rushing	Mike Wright	14 carries, 63 yards
Mississippi State	Receiving	Zavion Thomas	9 receptions, 112 yards, TD
Auburn	Passing	Payton Thorne	20/26, 230 yards, 3 TD
Auburn	Rushing	Jarquez Hunter	17 carries, 144 yards
Auburn	Receiving	Rivaldo Fairweather	4 receptions, 31 yards

=== vs Kentucky ===
Game Nine – Kentucky Wildcats (5–3) at Mississippi State Bulldogs (4–4) – Game summary

Quarter	1	2	3	4	Total
Kentucky	7	14	3	0	24
Mississippi State	0	3	0	0	3

at Davis Wade Stadium • Starkville, MS

- Date: Saturday, November 4, 2023
- Game time: 7:30 PM EST
- Game weather: –
- Game attendance: 52,329
- Referee: Scott Walker
- TV announcers (SECN): Tom Hart (play-by-play), Cole Cubelic (color), Alyssa Lang (sideline)

Game information

First quarter

- (10:11) UK – Demie Sumo–Karngbaye 4-yard pass from Devin Leary (Alex Raynor kick) (Drive: 8 plays, 62 yards, 4:00; Kentucky 7-0)

Second quarter

- (8:51) MSST – Kyle Ferrie 25-yard field goal (Drive: 20 plays, 88 yards, 12:29; Kentucky 7-3)
- (6:35) UK – D'Eryk Jackson 28-yard interception return (Alex Raynor kick) (Kentucky 14-3)
- (0:52) UK – Dane Key 4-yard pass from Devin Leary (Alex Raynor kick) (Drive: 9 plays, 63 yards, 3:54; Kentucky 21-3)

Third quarter

- (5:51) UK – Alex Raynor 32-yard field goal (Drive: 12 plays, 72 yards, 5:49; Kentucky 24-3)

Fourth quarter

- – no scoring

Statistics	UK	MSST
First downs	13	15
Total yards	54–271	66–218
Rushing yards	29–110	31–73
Passing yards	161	145
Passing: Comp–Att–Int	15–25–0	17–35–1
Time of possession	30:38	29:22

Team	Category	Player	Statistics
Kentucky	Passing	Devin Leary	13/22, 156 yards, 2 TD
Kentucky	Rushing	Ray Davis	21 carries, 80 yards
Kentucky	Receiving	Tayvion Robinson	5 receptions, 91 yards
Mississippi State	Passing	Mike Wright	11/21, 78 yards, INT
Mississippi State	Rushing	Seth Davis	4 carries, 24 yards
Mississippi State	Receiving	Zavion Thomas	6 receptions, 44 yards

=== at Texas A&M ===
Game Ten – Mississippi State Bulldogs (4–5) at Texas A&M Aggies (5–4) – Game summary

Quarter	1	2	3	4	Total
Mississippi State	7	3	0	0	10
Texas A&M	17	17	14	3	51

at Kyle Field • College Station, Texas

- Date: Saturday, November 11, 2023
- Game time: 6:30 p.m. CST
- Game weather: Cloudy, 57 °F (14 °C)
- Game attendance: 103,266
- Referee: Kyle Olson
- TV announcers (ESPN2): Brian Custer, Rod Gilmore, and Lauren Sisler

Game information

First quarter

- MSST – Zavion Thomas 94-yard kickoff return (Kyle Ferrie kick), 14:48. Bulldogs 7–0.
- TAMU – Jaylen Henderson 22-yard run (Randy Bond kick), 11:47. Tied 7–7. Drive: 6 plays, 80 yards, 2:57.
- TAMU – Amari Daniels 1-yard run (Randy Bond kick), 2:23. Aggies 14–7. Drive: 5 plays, 31 yards, 2:10.
- TAMU – Randy Bond 33-yard field goal, 0:00. Aggies 17–7. Drive: 4 plays, −1 yards, 1:55.

Second quarter

- TAMU – Randy Bond 52-yard field goal, 12:40. Aggies 20–7. Drive: 4 plays, 0 yards, 0:20.
- MSST – Kyle Ferrie 35-yard field goal, 6:55. Aggies 20–10. Drive: 10 plays, 57 yards, 5:45.
- TAMU – Ainias Smith 19-yard pass from Jaylen Henderson (Randy Bond kick), 4:58. Aggies 27–10. Drive: 6 plays, 72 yards, 1:55.
- TAMU – Jaylen Henderson 11-yard run (Randy Bond kick), 1:20. Aggies 34–10. Drive: 8 plays, 60 yards, 2:23.

Third quarter

- TAMU – Shemar Stewart 43-yard fumble return (Randy Bond kick), 11:10. Aggies 41–10.
- TAMU – Jahdae Walker 11-yard pass from Jaylen Henderson (Randy Bond kick), 2:00. Aggies 48–10. Drive: 10 plays, 80 yards, 5:12.

Fourth quarter

- TAMU – Randy Bond 45-yard field goal, 8:44. Aggies 51–10. Drive: 8 plays, 42 yards, 3:12.

Statistics	MSST	TXAM
First downs	12	24
Total yards	237	396
Rushing yards	133	246
Passing yards	104	150
Passing: Comp–Att–Int	10–21–3	11–21–0
Time of possession	29:24	30:36

Team	Category	Player	Statistics
Mississippi State	Passing	Mike Wright	5/9, 68 yards
Mississippi State	Rushing	Seth Davis	12 rushes, 79 yards
Mississippi State	Receiving	Zavion Thomas	4 receptions, 39 yards
Texas A&M	Passing	Jaylen Henderson	11/19, 150 yards, 2 TD
Texas A&M	Rushing	Jaylen Henderson	12 rushes, 60 yards, 2 TD
Texas A&M	Receiving	Ainias Smith	4 receptions, 64 yards, TD

=== vs Southern Miss ===
Game Eleven – Southern Miss Golden Eagles (3–7) at Mississippi State Bulldogs (4–6) – Game summary

Quarter	1	2	3	4	Total
Southern Miss	7	0	0	13	20
Mississippi State	3	13	7	18	41

at Davis Wade Stadium • Starkville, MS

- Date: Saturday, November 18, 2023
- Game time: 11:00 AM CST
- Game weather: –
- Game attendance: 53,855
- Referee: –
- TV announcers (SECN+/ESPN+): TBD

Game information

First quarter

Second quarter

Third quarter

Fourth quarter

Statistics	USM	MSST
First downs	10	18
Total yards	246	382
Rushing yards	105	238
Passing yards	141	144
Passing: Comp–Att–Int	11–21–1	12–27–0
Time of possession	31:42	28:18

Team	Category	Player	Statistics
Southern Miss	Passing	Billy Wiles	9/16, 89 yards, TD, INT
Southern Miss	Rushing	Frank Gore Jr.	22 carries, 66 yards
Southern Miss	Receiving	Jakarius Caston	2 receptions, 88 yards, TD
Mississippi State	Passing	Will Rogers	12/27, 144 yards, 2 TD
Mississippi State	Rushing	Jeffery Pittman	10 carries, 98 yards, TD
Mississippi State	Receiving	Zavion Thomas	3 receptions, 66 yards

=== vs No. 12 Ole Miss ===
Game Twelve – Ole Miss Rebels (9–2) at Mississippi State Bulldogs (5–6) – Game summary

Quarter	1	2	3	4	Total
No. 12 Rebels	0	3	7	7	17
Bulldogs	0	0	7	0	7

at Davis Wade Stadium • Starkville, MS

- Date: Thursday, November 23, 2023
- Game time: 6:30 p.m. CST
- Game weather: Cloudy • Temperature: 46 °F (8 °C)
- Game attendance: 60,412
- Referee: Steve Marlowe
- TV announcers (ESPN): Tom Hart (play-by-play), Jordan Rodgers (analyst), Cole Cubelic (sideline)

Game information

First quarter

- No scoring plays

Second quarter

- (8:23) Ole Miss – Caden Costa 36 Yd Field Goal
  Ole Miss 3–0; 13 plays, 66 yards, 6:22

Third quarter

- (8:33) Mississippi State – Will Rogers 1 Yd Run (Kyle Ferrie Kick)
  Mississippi State 7–3; 10 plays, 71 yards, 4:55
- (4:47) Ole Miss – Quinshon Judkins 2 Yd Run (Caden Davis Kick)
  Ole Miss 10–7; 10 plays, 75 yards, 3:46

Fourth quarter

- (13:26) Ole Miss – Caden Prieskorn 26 Yd pass from Jaxson Dart (Caden Davis Kick)
  Ole Miss 17–7; 10 plays, 71 yards, 4:26

Statistics	MISS	MSST
First downs	22	16
Total yards	307	303
Rushing yards	211	96
Passing yards	96	207
Passing: Comp–Att–Int	14–26–0	25–39–0
Time of possession	31:57	28:03

Team	Category	Player	Statistics
Ole Miss	Passing	Jaxson Dart	14/26, 96 yards, 1 TD
Ole Miss	Rushing	Quinshon Judkins	28 carries, 119 yards, 1 TD
Ole Miss	Receiving	Caden Prieskorn	4 receptions, 38 yards, 1 TD
Mississippi State	Passing	Will Rogers	25/39, 207 yards
Mississippi State	Rushing	Jo'Quavious Marks	12 carries, 39 yards
Mississippi State	Receiving	Zavion Thomas	6 receptions, 88 yards
