= Montrell Johnson Jr. =

American football player (born 2002)

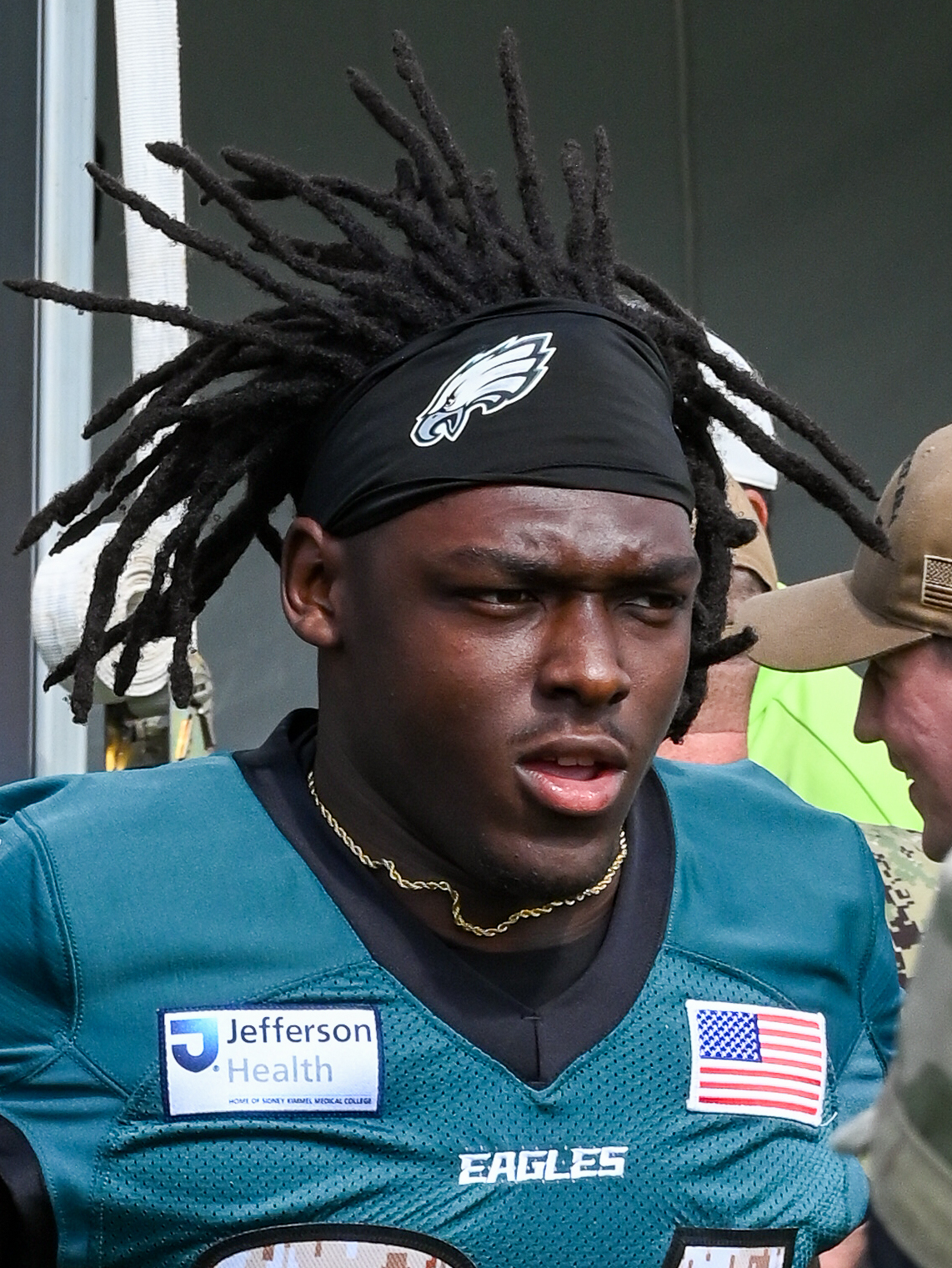
- Johnson in 2025

Profile
- Position: Running back

Personal information
- Born: October 13, 2002 (age 24); New Orleans, Louisiana, U.S.
- Listed height: 5 ft 11 in (1.80 m)
- Listed weight: 212 lb (96 kg)

Career information
- High school: De La Salle (New Orleans)
- College: Louisiana (2021); Florida (2022–2024)
- NFL draft: 2025: undrafted

Career history
- Philadelphia Eagles (2025)*; Arizona Cardinals (2025)*; Carolina Panthers (2025)*
- * Offseason or practice squad member only

Awards and highlights
- Sun Belt Freshman of the Year (2021); Second-team All-Sun Belt (2021)
- Stats at Pro Football Reference

Montrell Johnson Jr. (born October 13, 2002) is an American professional football running back. He played college football for the Louisiana Ragin' Cajuns and Florida Gators.

== Early life ==
Johson Jr. attended De La Salle High School in New Orleans, Louisiana. As a senior, he rushed for 1,249 yards with 13 touchdowns. He originally committed to the University of Arizona to play college football before switching to the University of Louisiana at Lafayette.

== College career ==
Johnson Jr. spent his freshman year at Louisiana. He played in all 14 games and was the Sun Belt Freshman of the Year after rushing for 838 yards on 162 carries with 12 touchdowns. After the season, he entered the transfer portal and ultimately transferred to the University of Florida. In his first year at Florida, he split carries with freshman Trevor Etienne. He finished with nine starts in 13 games and had 841 yards on 155 carries with 10 touchdowns. In 2023, he started the first 11 games of the season and led the team in rushing yards with 817 yards and scored six touchdowns.

=== Statistics ===
Year	Team	Games		Rushing				Receiving			
Year	Team	GP	GS	Att	Yards	Avg	TD	Rec	Yards	Avg	TD
2021	Louisiana	14	0	162	838	5.2	12	6	53	8.8	0
2022	Florida	13	9	155	841	5.4	10	12	58	4.8	1
2023	Florida	12	11	152	817	5.4	5	30	236	7.9	1
2024	Florida	9	9	100	593	5.9	6	13	64	4.9	0
Career		42	29	560	3,089	5.3	33	61	411	7.2	2

== Professional career ==
Pre-draft measurables
Height	Weight	Arm length	Hand span	Wingspan	40-yard dash	10-yard split	20-yard split	20-yard shuttle	Vertical jump	Broad jump	Bench press
5 ft 11 3/8 in (1.81 m)	212 lb (96 kg)	30 3/4 in (0.78 m)	9 1/4 in (0.23 m)	6 ft 3 3/8 in (1.91 m)	4.41 s	1.55 s	2.58 s	4.29 s	35.5 in (0.90 m)	10 ft 3 in (3.12 m)	17 reps
All values from NFL Combine/Pro Day

=== Philadelphia Eagles ===
Johnson signed with the Philadelphia Eagles as an undrafted free agent on May 2, 2025. He was waived on August 26 as part of final roster cuts, and re-signed to the practice squad on September 8. Johnson was released from the practice squad on September 9.

=== Arizona Cardinals ===
On November 26, 2025, Johnson was signed to the Arizona Cardinals' practice squad. He was released by the Cardinals on December 2.

=== Carolina Panthers ===
On December 17, 2025, Johnson was signed to the Carolina Panthers' practice squad. He signed a reserve/future contract with Carolina on January 12, 2026. On May 18, Johnson was waived by the Panthers with an injury designation.
