= Eugene Wilson III =

American football player (born 2004)

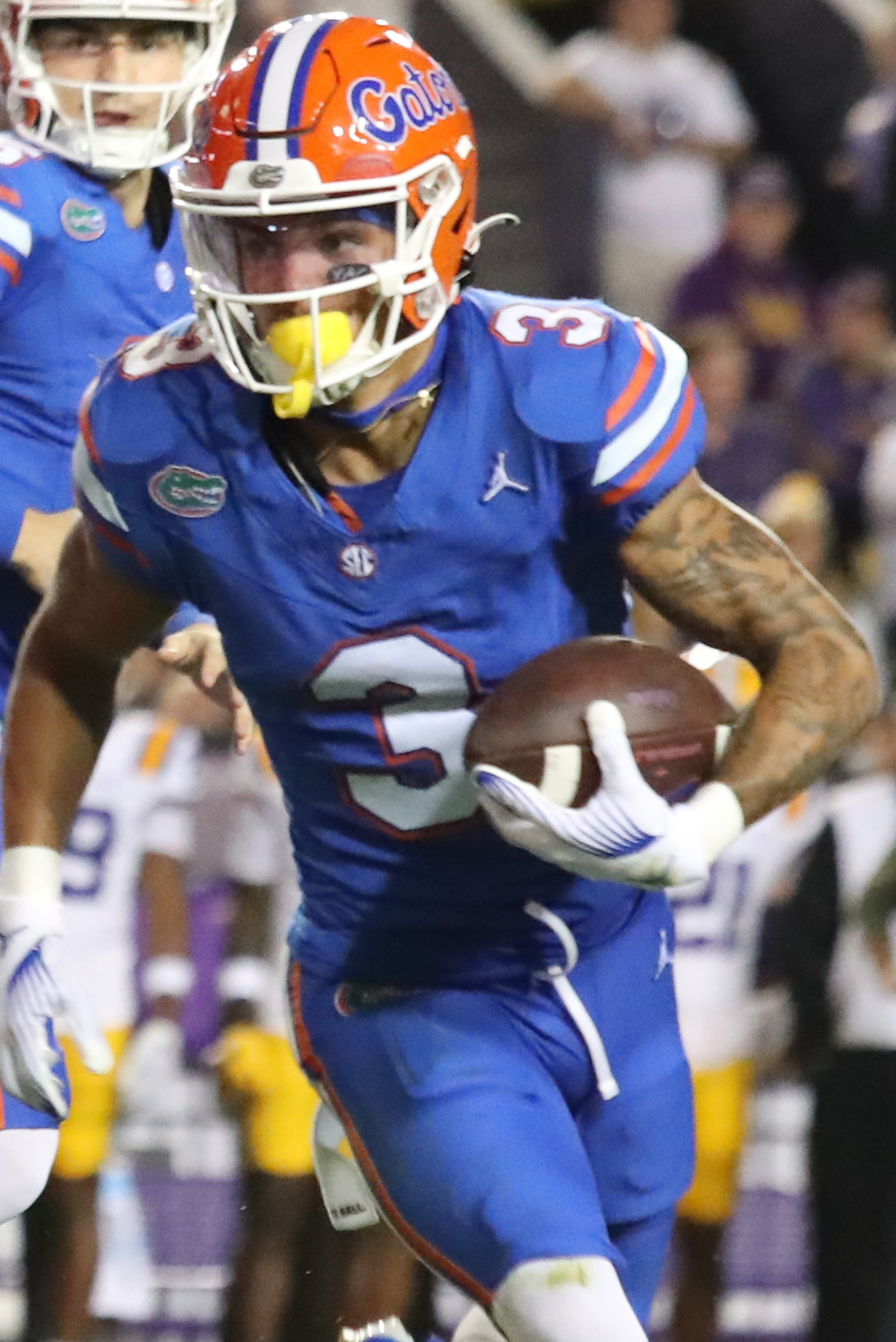
- Wilson in 2023

No. 3 – LSU Tigers
- Position: Wide receiver
- Class: Redshirt Junior

Personal information
- Born: December 16, 2004 (age 21); Tampa, Florida
- Listed height: 5 ft 11 in (1.80 m)
- Listed weight: 190 lb (86 kg)

Career information
- High school: Gaither (Tampa, Florida)
- College: Florida (2023–2025); LSU (2026–present)

Awards and highlights
- First-team All-SEC Freshman (2023)
- Stats at ESPN

Eugene "Tre" Wilson III (born December 16, 2004) is an American college football wide receiver for the LSU Tigers of the Southeastern Conference. He previously played for the Florida Gators.

== Early life ==
Wilson III attended Gaither High School in Tampa, Florida. As a senior, he had 40 receptions for 764 yards and 11 touchdowns. He was selected to play in the 2023 Under Armour All-America Game. A four star recruit, Wilson III committed to the University of Florida to play college football.

== College career ==
Wilson III became a starter during the second game of his true freshman season in 2023. Against Georgia, he set a school freshman record for receptions in a game with 11. On December 24, 2025, Wilson announced he will be entering the transfer portal.

== Personal life ==
His father, Eugene Wilson, played in the NFL.
