= Ricky Pearsall =

American football player (born 2000)

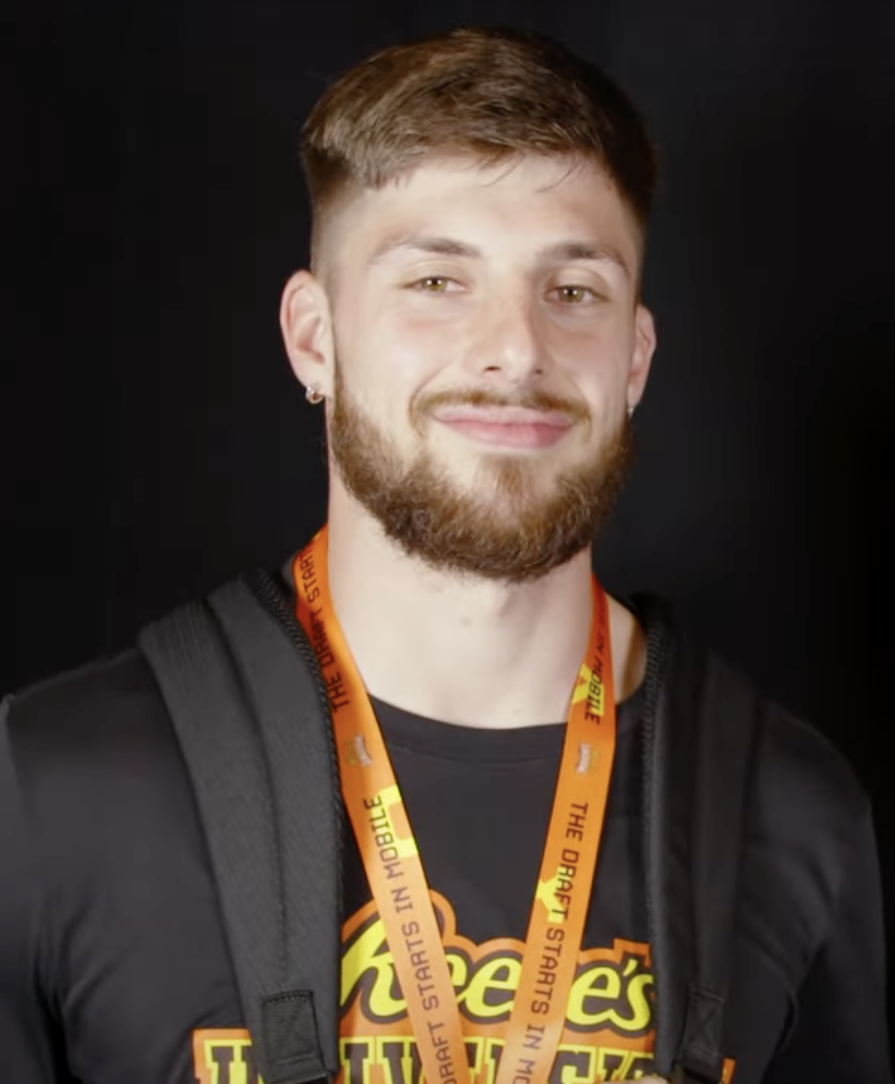
- Pearsall at the 2024 Senior Bowl

No. 1 – San Francisco 49ers
- Position: Wide receiver
- Roster status: Injured reserve

Personal information
- Born: September 9, 2000 (age 26); Phoenix, Arizona, U.S.
- Listed height: 6 ft 1 in (1.85 m)
- Listed weight: 189 lb (86 kg)

Career information
- High school: Corona del Sol (Tempe, Arizona)
- College: Arizona State (2019–2021); Florida (2022–2023)
- NFL draft: 2024: 1st round, 31st overall pick

Career history
- San Francisco 49ers (2024–present)

Career NFL statistics as of 2025
- Receptions: 67
- Receiving yards: 928
- Touchdowns: 3
- Stats at Pro Football Reference

Richard Pearsall Jr. (born September 9, 2000) is an American professional football wide receiver for the San Francisco 49ers of the National Football League (NFL). He played college football for the Arizona State Sun Devils and Florida Gators. Pearsall was selected by the 49ers in the first round of the 2024 NFL draft.

Pearsall was shot in the chest during a botched robbery attempt over his Rolex watch in San Francisco on August 31, 2024, and was released from the hospital the following day. He made his NFL debut in October.

== Early life ==
Pearsall was born on September 9, 2000, in Phoenix, Arizona. He grew up in nearby Chandler, Arizona, and attended Corona del Sol High School in Tempe, Arizona. As a junior, he set the Arizona High School 6A receiving yard record for a single game with 342 on 14 receptions against Gilbert High School. Pearsall finished the season with 74 receptions for 1,153 yards and 15 touchdowns. Pearsall was rated a three-star recruit and committed to play college football at Arizona State over offers from Air Force, Hawaii, Idaho, New Mexico State, Northern Arizona, and UC Davis.

== College career ==
Pearsall began his college career at Arizona State. He had seven receptions for 128 yards as a freshman. Pearsall played in all four of the Sun Devils' games in the COVID-19 shortened 2020 Pac-12 season and caught six passes for 86 yards and one touchdown. Pearsall had 48 receptions for 580 yards and a team-high four receiving touchdowns as a junior. After the 2021 season, he entered the NCAA transfer portal.

Pearsall ultimately transferred to Florida after also considering Oregon. He suffered from a foot injury during training camp, but recovered prior to the start of the 2022 season. Pearsall had five receptions for 148 yards and two touchdowns in a loss to Florida State. Pearsall finished the 2022 season with 33 receptions for 661 yards and five touchdowns. In the 2023 season, Pearsall had 65 receptions for 965 yards and four touchdowns.

== Professional career ==
Pre-draft measurables
Height	Weight	Arm length	Hand span	Wingspan	40-yard dash	10-yard split	20-yard split	20-yard shuttle	Three-cone drill	Vertical jump	Broad jump	Bench press
6 ft 1 in (1.85 m)	189 lb (86 kg)	30 7/8 in (0.78 m)	9 1/4 in (0.23 m)	6 ft 1 3/8 in (1.86 m)	4.41 s	1.57 s	2.53 s	4.05 s	6.64 s	42.0 in (1.07 m)	10 ft 9 in (3.28 m)	17 reps
All values from NFL Combine

The San Francisco 49ers selected Pearsall in the first round (31st overall) of the 2024 NFL draft. Pearsall was the sixth wide receiver drafted in 2024.

=== 2024 season ===
On June 21, 2024, the San Francisco 49ers signed Pearsall to a four-year, $12.35 million contract that includes a signing bonus of $5.93 million and is fully guaranteed at signing. On September 2, Pearsall was placed on the reserve/NFI list following a gunshot wound to the chest. He was activated on October 19.

Pearsall made his NFL debut in week 7, and recorded three receptions for 21 yards in a 28–18 loss against the Kansas City Chiefs. Pearsall caught his first career touchdown, along with 4 receptions for 73 yards, on November 10, against the Tampa Bay Buccaneers. Against the Detroit Lions in week 17, Pearsall had 8 receptions for 141 yards and a touchdown, marking the most yards by a 49ers rookie receiver in a single game since Jerry Rice's 241 yards in 1985. In the 2024 season, he had 31 receptions for 400 yards and three touchdowns.

=== 2025 season ===
On July 18, Pearsall was placed on the PUP list as he dealt with a hamstring injury. Pearsall played in the 49ers' first four games before injuring his PCL in a 26–21 loss against the Jacksonville Jaguars. Pearsall returned for the 49ers' Week 11 matchup against the Arizona Cardinals.

=== 2026 season ===
On August 1, 2026, it was announced that Pearsall was to undergo knee surgery due to his PCL injury. He was placed on injured reserve the same day, ending his 2026 season prematurely.

== Career statistics ==
=== NFL ===
Legend
**Bold**	Career high

==== Regular season ====
Year	Team	Games		Receiving					Rushing					Fumbles	
Year	Team	GP	GS	Rec	Yds	Avg	Lng	TD	Att	Yds	Avg	Lng	TD	Fum	Lost
2024	SF	**11**	4	31	400	12.9	**46T**	**3**	**3**	**45**	**15.0**	**39**	0	0	0
2025	SF	9	**9**	**36**	**528**	**14.7**	45	0	2	-2	-1.0	2	0	0	0
Career		20	13	67	928	13.9	46T	3	5	43	8.6	39	0	0	0

==== Postseason ====
Year	Team	Games		Tackles				Fumbles			Interceptions					
Year	Team	GP	GS	Comb	Solo	Ast	Sack	FF	FR	Yds	Int	Yds	Avg	Lng	TD	PD
2025	SF	1	1	0	0	0	0.0	0	0	0	0	0	0.0	0	0	0
Career		1	1	0	0	0	0.0	0	0	0	0	0	0.0	0	0	0

=== College ===
College statistics
Year	Team	Games		Receiving				Rushing			
Year	Team	GP	GS	Rec	Yards	Avg	TD	Att	Yards	Avg	TD
2019	Arizona State	**13**	0	7	128	18.3	0	1	1	1.0	0
2020	Arizona State	4	1	6	86	14.3	1	3	33	11.0	1
2021	Arizona State	**13**	11	48	580	12.1	4	6	44	7.3	1
2022	Florida	**13**	10	33	661	**20.0**	**5**	**8**	**113**	14.1	1
2023	Florida	12	**12**	**65**	**965**	14.8	4	3	62	**20.7**	**2**
Career		55	34	159	2,420	15.9	14	21	253	10.82	5

== Shooting ==
On August 31, 2024, a 17-year-old from Tracy, California, allegedly attempting to steal Pearsall's Rolex watch, shot Pearsall through the chest. The robbery occurred in the afternoon in Union Square, San Francisco. He was reportedly en route to an autograph signing event. There was a struggle for the gun, and both Pearsall and the suspect were shot. He was transported to San Francisco General Hospital for treatment and was released the next day after his condition was upgraded from serious to fair. Nine days after the shooting, Pearsall had recovered enough to appear on the sidelines of the 49ers' season opener against the New York Jets at Levi's Stadium, and to warm applause from the crowd, presented signed 49ers jerseys to the police officer and trauma surgeon who had saved his life.

== Personal life ==
Pearsall's father, Ricky Pearsall Sr., is a captain within the Phoenix Fire Department and played college football at Northern Arizona.
