= Alyssa Lang =

Sports reporter and anchor

- Born: Huntersville, North Carolina, U.S.
- Education: University of South Carolina
- Occupation: Sports journalist
- Employer: ESPN

Alyssa Lang is an American sports reporter and anchor. Lang is a college football sideline reporter for the SEC Network, where she has hosted the programs SEC Now and Thinking Out Loud. She has co-hosted her own program, Out of Pocket, starting in 2020, and she was joined on the program by Takeo Spikes in 2023. She previously worked for the Columbia, South Carolina TV station WLTX and later for First Coast News in Jacksonville, Florida.

== Career ==
Lang graduated from the University of South Carolina with a degree in broadcast journalism in 2015. While in university, she joined the TV station WLTX in Columbia as an intern in 2013. She also worked for SPEEDTV and GamecockCentral.com around this time. She had been working as a weekend sports anchor before she left the station in 2016 to join First Coast News in Jacksonville, Florida.

After two years at First Coast News, Lang joined the SEC Network in 2018 as a studio show anchor and host, where she has hosted the SEC Network programs Thinking Out Loud and SEC Now. In 2020, she was announced to be co-hosting ESPN Radio's Primetime show on Sunday afternoons with co-host Field Yates, and she was given her own show, Out of Pocket with Alyssa Lang, on the SEC Network. The State of Columbia in 2021 called her "one of the faces of the SEC Network" and praised her for being "cognizant of the place she holds as part of ESPN's star-studded college football lineup" while "[maintaining] the realness and effervescent personality those in Columbia recall so clearly." In 2023, football analyst Takeo Spikes was announced to be joining Lang on Out of Pocket as a co-host.

Lang has also worked for WCNC in Charlotte, North Carolina. In 2022, she was announced to be guest host of The Paul Finebaum Show (which would make her the first woman to guest host the show) after she hosted a radio version of the show earlier that year.

Lang co-hosted ESPN's SportsCenter with Linda Cohn the first week of July 2024.

== Personal life ==
Lang is a native of Huntersville, North Carolina. When she was young, she spent weekends in the fall traveling from her home in Charlotte to football games at Virginia Tech in Blacksburg, where her parents are alumni. In high school, Lang's public speaking teacher told her parents during a parent-teacher conference that she could have success in broadcasting because of her skill in speaking in front of her classmates.

Lang's husband is football analyst Trevor Sikkema. After a 2022 game, Lang asked Mississippi State University coach Mike Leach for advice for her upcoming wedding, and Leach in response recommended that she take the opportunity after the football season to "elope".
