= Cole Cubelic =

American football player and sports analyst

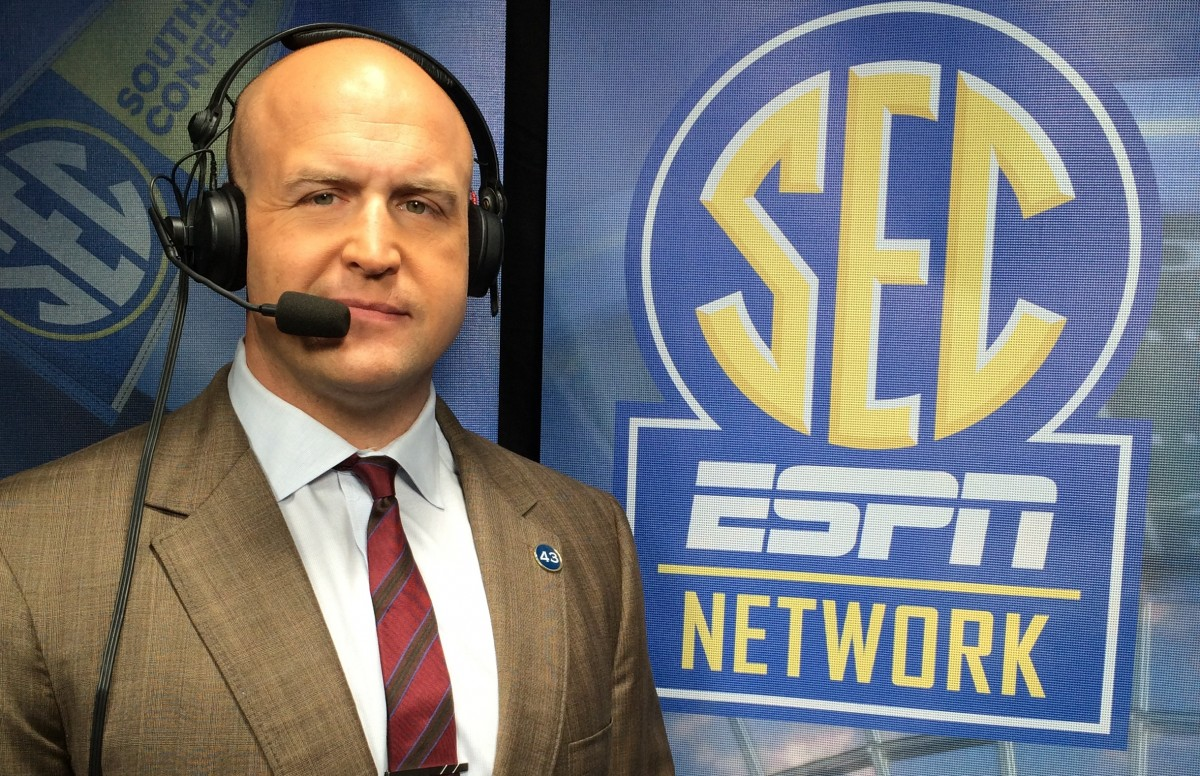
- Cubelic in 2016
- Born: Center Point, Alabama, U.S.
- Education: Auburn University

Cole Cubelic is a sports analyst and former college football player. He played as a center for the Auburn Tigers. Cubelic is the chief reporter for SEC Network's football coverage.

Cubelic played for the Tigers from 1996 to 2001. He graduated with a bachelor's degree in Communications and Media Studies. He joined ESPN in 2011 working as an analyst covering Southeastern Conference (SEC) football. In addition to the SEC, he also covered Sun Belt Conference football games. Beginning in 2009, Cubelic hosted the radio show "The Cube Show," which aired on WUMP in Huntsville, Alabama.

In March 2018, Cubelic began hosting "Three Man Front" on WJOX-FM in Birmingham alongside Aaron Suttles and Landrum Roberts. On July 12, 2021, Cubelic began co-hosting a new morning drive show on WJOX-FM called, "McElroy and Cubelic in the Morning". The show paired him with ESPN on-air talent and former Alabama Crimson Tide quarterback Greg McElroy as the co-host. "McElroy and Cubelic in the Morning" currently airs on both WJOX-FM and WUMP from 7 am to 10 am CST.
