= History of Ohio State Buckeyes football =

The history of Ohio State Buckeyes football covers 125 years through the 2014 season. The team has represented the Ohio State University in the Western Conference, its successor the Big Ten, and in the NCAA Division I. Its history parallels the development of college football as a major sport in the United States and demonstrates the status of the Buckeyes as one of its major programs.

== History ==
=== Early history (1890–1950) ===
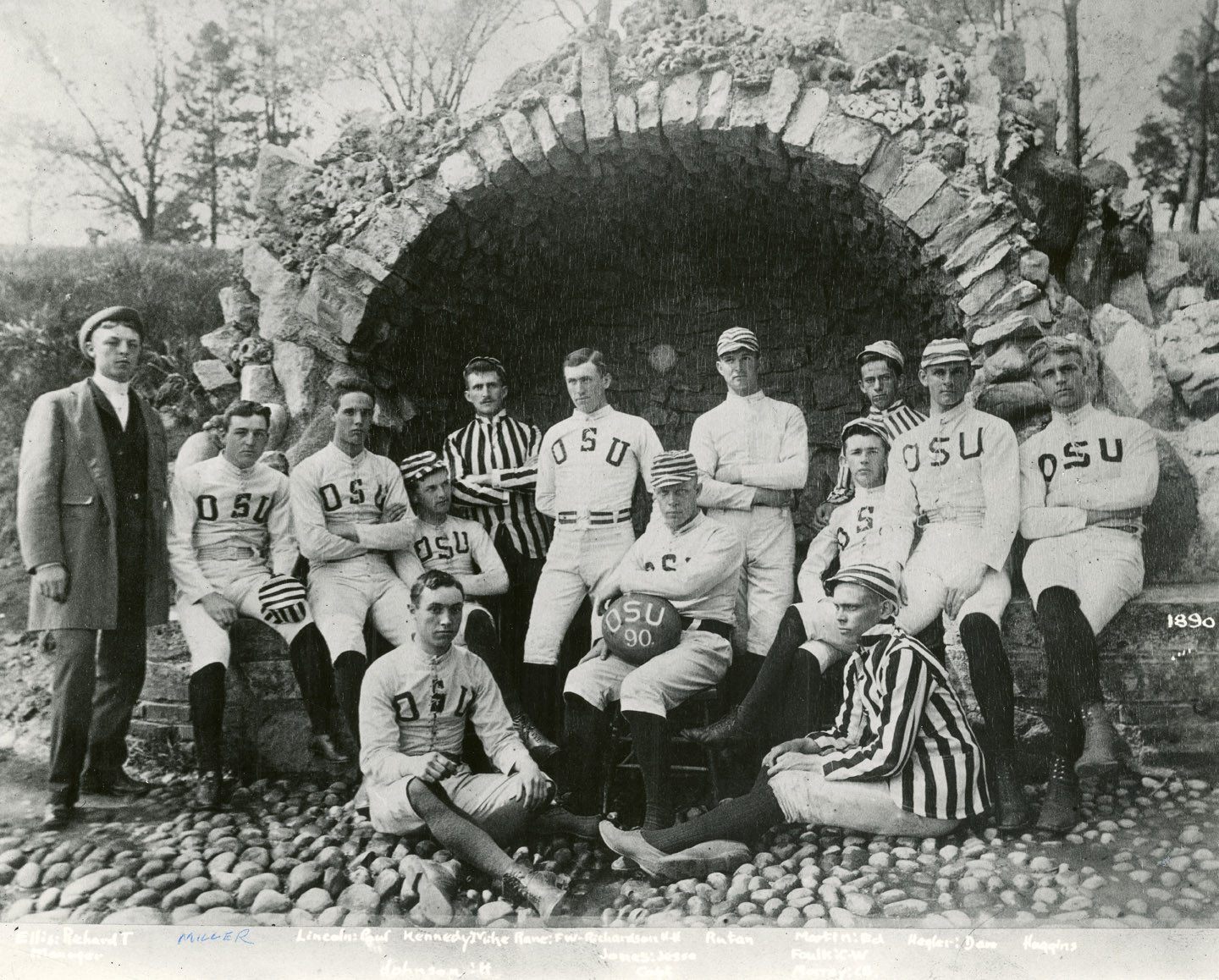
The first Ohio State University football team in 1890

In the mid-1880s the growing fever of the Walter Camp-style of football, formulated between 1880 and 1883 among colleges of the future Ivy League, reached Columbus, Ohio. Abortive early attempts at forming a team occurred in 1886 and 1887. Future Nebraska governor Chester Hardy Aldrich captained the team in 1886, and Stevens Institute of Technology alumnus Joseph Frederick Firestone led the attempt in 1887. The Buckeyes' first game, played on Saturday, May 3, 1890, in Delaware, Ohio, against Ohio Wesleyan University, was a victory, but other projected spring games could not be arranged. The Delaware County Historical Society has set a marker at the site of that game. George Cole, an undergraduate, is generally given credit for organizing the first intercollegiate team at Ohio State, although more recent scholarship has put that claim in doubt. Agreed by all is that by the fall of 1890 Cole persuaded Alexander S. Lilley to coach the squad. Lilley brought in a renowned Princeton fullback and soon-to-be coach of the Purdue Boilermakers, Knowlton L. "Snake" Ames, to familiarize the team with fundamentals. Play resumed in November, with home games played at Recreation Park (near the current Schiller Park in south Columbus), but Ohio State lost all three. The next year representatives met with counterparts from Adelbert, Denison, Buchtel, and Kenyon Colleges to agree to various terms and laid the groundwork for the informal "Big Six" conference of Ohio colleges. Throughout its first decade nearly all of Ohio State's opponents were in-state teams. In 1892 Jack Ryder became Ohio State's first paid coach, earning $15 a week during a ten-week season. After losing his first game, against Oberlin College and its new coach John Heisman, Ryder compiled a 22–22–2 record. Over the next eight years, under a number of coaches, the team played to a cumulative record of 31 wins, 39 losses, and 2 ties. Home games were moved to a field on campus at Neil and 11th Avenues, then in 1898 to Ohio Field at High Street and Woodruff Avenue. Play was brutal and dangerous but continued to grow in popularity. The first game against Michigan, in Ann Arbor, was a 34–0 loss in 1897, a year that saw the low point in Buckeye football history with a 1–7–1 record.

In 1899 the university hired John Eckstorm away from Kenyon College (Kenyon had beaten Ohio State 29–0 the previous year). He brought professional coaching skills to the program and immediately won the Big Six for the first time by going undefeated, as well as beating Oberlin College after previous teams had gone 0–6. His second season was almost as successful, as the 8–1–1 record included a scoreless tie against Michigan. In 1901, however, center John Sigrist, a 27-year-old senior, was fatally injured in a game against Western Reserve and the continuation of intercollegiate football at Ohio State was in serious question. Although the school's athletic board backed away from a confrontation and let the team decide its future, a faculty resolution to cancel the season was not easily defeated and Eckstorm resigned. In 1902 the team won its first four games by a combined score of 86–0, then traveled to Ann Arbor and lost to the Wolverines—86-0. From that humiliation Fred Cornell, a freshman football player, wrote Carmen Ohio, which became the school's alma mater. In 1906, yet another coaching change saw the hiring of Albert A. Herrnstein, the coach of Purdue, who had been a running back for Michigan and had scored six touchdowns against Ohio State in 1902. Herrnstein's four years were successful (although not against his former team) and also saw the first use of the forward pass by the Buckeyes.

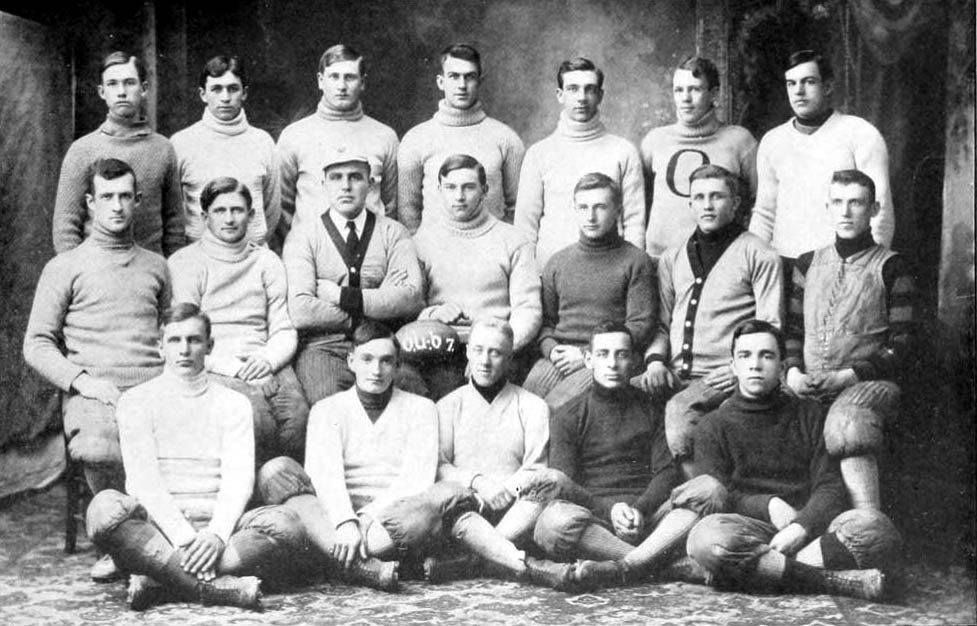
1907 Ohio State team

In 1908 the name of University Field was changed to Ohio Field, and although the team continued to prosper, continuing losses to Michigan, Case, and Oberlin saw the cycle of coaching changes continue. By the end of the 1912 season, Ohio State's 23rd, the team had had eleven coaches, sixteen coaching changes, and stood 126–72–17, having never beaten Michigan. Among the oddities occurring during its formative years, the Buckeyes won a game by forfeit (its only win in 1897, over Ohio Medical), lost one by forfeit (Penn State in 1912), and had a player play for both teams in one game (Bob Hager, loaned to Marietta College in 1898, a game which Marietta won). Football underwent a number of developments in 1912 that mark the year as a watershed point in Buckeye history. In the game itself, touchdowns were re-valued to the six points they are now. On April 6, the Western Conference approved Ohio State's application to join. The Bucks would play their first conference schedule in 1913 and be limited by its rules to just seven games a season. The price at the time was steep: Michigan had left the conference in 1906 and conference policy forbade playing the Wolverines. The program itself was removed from the Department of Physical Education and made a part of the new Department of Athletics, an organization under faculty control, but a move which saw the hiring of full-time coaches with faculty status. The new football coach, John Richards, was also named the first Director of Athletics but resigned from both positions at the end of the football season. Lynn Wilbur St. John, a medical student who had just been hired as business manager for OSU athletics, was named the second AD and served in that capacity for 35 years.

Ohio State's entry into the Western Conference initially saw a reduction in the number of games played each season but otherwise continued success for the program, with their first three seasons' record 14–5–2 and finishes in conference standings of 6th, 4th, and 3rd place. Coach John Wilce brought a stability to the program not previously experienced, and in 1916 he also brought Charles W. "Chic" Harley, OSU's first "triple threat" (runner, passer, and kicker), to the varsity team. The Buckeyes had their first undefeated-untied season in 1916, and repeated as conference champions in 1917, going 8–0–1. Harley left school for wartime service in the U.S. Army Air Service, and the Buckeyes saw an undefeated streak broken at 22 games as a result. Harley returned in 1919, named an All-American for the third time, but Ohio State finished second in the Western Conference when Illinois, in the season's last game, scored the only touchdown of the year against the Buckeyes, then kicked a field goal on the final play to win 9–7. However 1919 also saw the first Buckeye victory over Michigan (which had re-joined the conference in 1917), 13–3 in Ann Arbor, the first of three straight wins against its rival. Harley's exploits prompted both a new surge of popularity in Ohio State football and higher attendance figures, with the demand far outreaching the capacity of Ohio Field. Discussion of a new, larger facility at a location away from High Street had begun as early as 1913 but plans took shape when a horseshoe design was presented by alumnus Howard Dwight Smith ('07) in 1918 and a professionally managed public fundraising drive begun in October 1920 that quickly pledged more than $1 million of the $1.34 million cost stipulated in the April 1921 construction contract. Ground was broken on August 3, 1921, and Ohio Stadium opened October 7, 1922. With the opening of the new stadium, however, Buckeye fortunes on the gridiron also turned sour. Ohio State had won its third Big Ten championship in 1920, losing its only game to California in the Rose Bowl, and a superb 1921 season had been marred by two inexplicable losses to Oberlin (the last Buckeye loss to an Ohio team) and to winless Illinois. The dedication game for Ohio Stadium was against Michigan, which became the first of six straight losses to the Wolverines, and the 1922 season the first of three losing seasons. The Buckeyes rebounded in 1926, losing only to Michigan as a result of a missed extra point with two minutes to play. The game was also notable in that more than 90,000 attended, a "standing room only" figure that exceeded stadium seating capacity by nearly forty percent. However Ohio State had otherwise unspectacular seasons and never finished higher than third place in the conference, going 28–21–6 in Wilce's final seven years as head coach. Criticism of Wilce was widespread, particularly from the "downtown coaches" (a term that came into usage in the 1920s to describe vocal businessmen and other influential supporters of the program), for both failing to win the conference and for the extended losing streak to Michigan. Wilce forestalled further criticism and possible removal by resigning on June 3, 1928, effective at the end of the upcoming season, to practice medicine. His sixteen years as coach had brought Ohio State to the forefront of intercollegiate football and his .695 winning percentage remains impressive. Wilce's assistant and former Buckeye letterman, Sam Willaman, was expected to inherit the head coaching position at the December meeting of the Athletic Board, but Athletic Director St. John refused to publicly commit the program to his succession. During 1928 there had been public speculation that Knute Rockne, famed coach of Notre Dame but enduring a mediocre season and stung by persistent criticisms of overemphasis of football at Notre Dame, might leave the Irish to take the position at Ohio State. At least two sources indicate that St. John and Rockne met in early January in New Orleans and that Rockne accepted the position at OSU contingent on his release by Notre Dame. Whether Rockne was merely trying to gain leverage for a new, larger stadium at Notre Dame and fewer road games, or whether he seriously contemplated coaching the Buckeyes will never be known, for history records that he was "unusually silent on the matter." Willaman, a reticent, methodical man, was then selected and completely overhauled the coaching staff. Among the new coaches hired were Don Miller, one of Notre Dame's famous "Four Horsemen", and Ernie Godfrey, who went on to coach at Ohio State for 33 years. Willaman's stint began auspiciously with three wins that included a victory over Michigan, but the team finished poorly with an overall 4–3–1, and although the 1930 team had a better record, it lost to its rival and still managed only a fourth-place finish in the Big Ten. The situation grew worse in 1932 when an experienced Buckeye team disappointed expectations and the effects of the Great Depression significantly lowered attendance. The 1933 team lost only once, but it was to Michigan and again cost the Bucks a conference title. Heavily criticized within and without the university, Willaman resigned in January 1934 to become head coach at Western Reserve, hounded out of Columbus (according to Time magazine) by the "downtown coaches".

In hiring Francis Schmidt in March 1934 to coach its football team, Ohio State moved an already "big-time" program to a higher level of competition. Schmidt was a well-established high-profile coach, having successfully coached Tulsa, Arkansas, and Texas Christian University, and he was both an appealingly eccentric personality and an acknowledged offensive innovator. His TCU teams had won two straight Southwest Conference championships and had only lost five times in five seasons. Schmidt's offensive schemes—which totaled more than 300 plays using seven formations predicated on speed, passing, trickery, and numerous laterals (a "wide-open" style called "razzle-dazzle")—were always changing. He did not neglect defensive play, either; his TCU teams had won 34 of their 47 victories by shutout. Schmidt was the first Buckeye football coach granted a multi-year contract. Schmidt's 1934 squad opened the season with a 33–0 victory over Indiana, the initial shutout of the 25 registered during Schmidt's 56-game career at Ohio State. The first touchdown scored by a Schmidt team was a fake reverse that went for 78 yards, epitomizing his style. The Buckeyes won seven of their eight games in 1934, four by shutout (including a 34–0 defeat of Michigan, the first of 4 straight seasons in which the Buckeyes held the Wolverines scoreless), but finished second in the Big Ten to National Champion Minnesota. The only loss of 1934, to Illinois in an away game that honored Red Grange, resulted from a missed point after touchdown. A 76–0 rout of Western Reserve ended scheduling against other Ohio universities until 1992. (Its record against in-state college opponents through 1934 was 153–45–15.) Recognizing that he had been hired in part to beat Michigan, Schmidt's first four seasons saw victories over their archrival, all by shut-out, beginning with a 34–0 trouncing in 1934. Quarterback Tippy Dye became the first Buckeye signal caller to win three consecutive games over Michigan. The 1935 squad also went 7–1 but were co-champions of the Big Ten with Minnesota. The sole loss was to Notre Dame, 18–13, in the first contest between the programs. Ohio State had dominated the first half in all aspects, leading 13–0, but did not gain a yard in the second half. Notre Dame took advantage of a serious player substitution mistake by Schmidt that by the rules of the day deprived the Buckeyes of their first string backfield in the last quarter, and also recovered a Buckeye fumble with less than a minute remaining in the game that set up the winning touchdown drive. Schmidt's next three seasons were less successful, finishing second in the conference twice and just sixth in 1938. However, in 1939 the Buckeyes won the Big Ten championship despite a final-game loss to Michigan; this has only occurred twice in the rivalry since, in 1982 and 2004, when Michigan won the Big Ten despite losing to Ohio State. Quarterback Don Scott was named an All-American, and the team reached its highest ranking at number four following a win over Minnesota on October 21. The next week it hosted its first ever top-ten matchup, against No. 7 and eventual national champion Cornell, but lost 23–14. Schmidt's popularity had been fading for a number of reasons, including the mediocre showing in 1938, but the championship in 1939 and anticipation of an even better season in 1940 with 21 returning lettermen appeared to have secured his job. However, the Buckeyes lost three games in a row for the first time under Schmidt, culminated by 21–7 loss to Cornell in Ithaca, New York, in its first-ever matchup against a No. 1 ranked team. Three weeks later the Buckeyes were routed by Michigan and its senior Heisman Trophy winner Tom Harmon, 40–0, to drop to 4–4. Schmidt's entire coaching staff resigned in early December, followed by Schmidt on December 17, 1940, widely believed to avoid being fired. The Athletic Board accepted all six resignations that same day.

Immediately following the resignations, the Massillon, Ohio newspaper, The Independent, touted the coach of Massillon Washington High School's football team, Paul Brown, to succeed Schmidt. Brown's Tigers had just won their sixth straight state championship and had outscored opponents 477–6 while drawing an attendance of 116,000. An organized movement to hire Brown spread with the endorsement of his candidacy by numerous Ohio periodicals, and by a statewide letter-writing campaign orchestrated by the Ohio High School Football Coaches Association. The Athletic Department interviewed four candidates in a brief but intensive national selection process, and despite his having no previous experience coaching college football and being just 32 years of age, Brown was named head coach on January 14, 1941, with a 3-year contract. Brown immediately changed Ohio State's style of offense from the complex "razzle-dazzle" schemes of Schmidt to a power attack using the single-wing and T-formations, stressing precise play execution. He also hired a coaching staff of three former assistants from Massillon, two coaches he knew from rival high schools, and one member of Schmidt's deposed staff. Brown planned and organized his program in great detail, delegating to his assistant coaches and using highly structured practices limited to 90 minutes duration to create a strong sense of team unity and identity. The 1941 season was colored by the possibility of America's entry into the Second World War and ended just two weeks before the attack on Pearl Harbor. In the opener against Missouri, the Tigers befuddled the Buckeyes with a new offensive formation, the Split-T, but failed to score on a number of drives, allowing Ohio State to escape with a 12–7 victory. The Buckeyes then defeated a West Coast school for the first time, stunning the USC Trojans 33–0 in the Los Angeles Coliseum. The remainder of its games were all close, losing only to Northwestern and tying Michigan. Northwestern was led by sophomore tailback Otto Graham, who so impressed Brown in dominating Ohio State that Brown later made him the centerpiece of his AAFC–NFL Cleveland Browns professional team. At 6–1–1 Ohio State tied Michigan for second place in the Big Ten.

World War II immediately decimated the rosters of most college football teams. Ohio State lost 22 veteran players, 18 of them lettermen, of its 1941 team to graduation and military service, and fielded a team of 24 sophomores, 16 juniors, and 3 seniors, including tailback Les Horvath. The Big Ten allowed an expanded season of ten games and Ohio State added a game against military football teams to both the beginning and end of their schedule. The initial five games all resulted in victories, including a blowout of a U.S. Army team from Fort Knox. Indiana, with a strong team, followed and Ohio State overcame a late Hoosier lead on a particularly hot, humid afternoon for a narrow win. USC came into Ohio Stadium and was again beaten, 28–12, resulting in the Buckeyes being ranked first in the Associated Press poll. On October 31 the Buckeyes traveled to Madison, Wisconsin, to play the Badgers. Wartime demands forced the team to travel on passenger cars that had been in storage when first-line equipment was diverted to the war effort, and to be housed on the 6th floor of a downtown hotel without elevators. The night before the game a massive attack of dysentery struck the team, attributed to the water in the hotel. The subsequent 17–7 loss to Wisconsin has gone down in the annals of Ohio State as the "bad-water game". The Buckeyes' only score came on a drive of 96 yards in the 3rd quarter and they dropped to 6th in the AP poll. The Buckeyes decisively won the remainder of their games in 1942. Despite defeating Pitt by 40 points the Buckeyes dropped to 10th in the polls, but moved up five spots when they handily defeated Illinois in a game held in Cleveland. They then defeated 4th-ranked Michigan 21–7 before a Homecoming crowd of nearly 72,000 to win the Big Ten championship, passing for three touchdowns in a heavy rain and taking the ball away from the Wolverines five times. In their second extra game, the Buckeyes trounced a U.S. Navy service team coached by Bernie Bierman and made up of former professional and college players. When Holy Cross stunned their rival, top-ranked Boston College, 55–12, and Georgia overwhelmed second-ranked Georgia Tech 34–0, the Buckeyes topped Georgia in the final poll to win its first national championship. Brown had recruited what was reputedly the finest freshman team in Ohio history in 1942 but lost virtually all of them to military service. In 1943 Ohio State was handicapped when the school affiliated itself with the U.S. Army's ASTP officer training, which did not allow its trainees to participate in varsity sports, while schools such as Michigan and Purdue became part of the Navy's V-12 program, which did. Although the Big Ten promulgated a special wartime exemption in 1943 allowing freshmen to play varsity football, Ohio State found itself in competition against older and larger teams (both military and college) featuring players such as Elroy Hirsch. The 1943 "Baby Bucks" had only five returning players and one starter from the national champion team, six from the 1942 freshman team, and 33 17-year-old freshmen, going 3–6. Prominent on the 1942–44 teams was Bill Willis, the Buckeyes' first African American star, honored in 2007 along with Chic Harley and Archie Griffin as one of the three most important players in Buckeyes football history.

Eligible for call-up into the military by the Selective Service, Paul Brown accepted a commission as a lieutenant (junior grade) in the United States Navy on April 12, 1944, and was assigned to the Great Lakes Naval Training Center at Chicago. Brown submitted the name of his assistant coach, Carroll Widdoes, to direct the team in his absence. Widdoes had been an assistant to Brown since 1934 and had turned down the prestigious head coach position at Washington High School to go with Brown to Ohio State. Though his only head coaching experience was at Massillon's Longfellow Junior High School, Widdoes was appointed acting head coach by the OSU Athletic Board on April 14. The 1944 team fielded only thirteen upperclassmen and 31 freshmen, and lost standout halfback Dean Sensenbaugher to an appointment to West Point. However, in August it received a tremendous boost when the U.S. Army's ASTP training program was discontinued at Ohio State and the Big Ten granted dental school student Les Horvath, discharged from ASTP, a fourth year of eligibility. Widdoes moved him to quarterback in the T formation and played him at tailback in the single wing in an otherwise freshman backfield, and as a result Ohio State went undefeated and untied. One of their victories was over Paul Brown's previously unbeaten Great Lakes Navy team, with Horvath scoring two of the Buckeyes' three final-quarter touchdowns. The Buckeyes preserved their perfect season with a dramatic 4th quarter drive for a come-from-behind victory over Michigan. Ohio State finished second in the national rankings behind Army and Horvath became the first Buckeye to be awarded the Heisman Trophy. The football program took an unexpected turn when Paul Brown, still in the Navy and with the war continuing, signed a contract on February 6, 1945, to coach what would become the Cleveland Browns of the professional All-America Football Conference. A week later Carroll Widdoes was made the official head coach of Ohio State. World War II ended by the time the 1945 season began and Widdoes integrated a number of returning military veterans into his team, and although the Buckeyes had a creditable year at 7–2, they were manhandled at home by Purdue and lost a tight game to Michigan, finishing third in the conference behind Indiana and Michigan. Despite having the highest two-year winning percentage of any Buckeye coach, Widdoes asked to return to an assistant's position, which was granted. A few years later he left Ohio State to take the head coach and athletic director's position at Ohio University. Offensive coordinator Paul Bixler switched positions with Widdoes in 1946. Bixler had been hired away from Colgate in 1941 by Paul Brown, familiar with his work when Bixler was an assistant at Canton McKinley High School, and had never head-coached a team before taking over the Buckeyes. Although personable and detail-oriented, Bixler did not garner the respect of his players, partly because he rarely played anyone but the starters, and Ohio State endured a mediocre 4–3–2 season. The season ended with a humiliating 58–6 loss to Michigan. Bixler resigned and returned to Colgate to be its head football coach. Talk of Ohio State being a "graveyard of coaches" became commonplace, a reputation that lingered for decades.

Wes Fesler became head coach with a five-year contract as the result of a collaborative selection process by retiring Athletic Director Lynn St. John and his successor, Dick Larkins. Fesler was an Ohio State alumnus and had been a star athlete, winning nine letters (three in football), had been a three-time All-American, and was Big Ten MVP in 1930. As head coach at Pittsburgh he had nearly beaten Ohio State in 1946 and seemed the best choice to bring stability back to the program. Fesler employed a single wing offense with returning Dean Sensenbaugher at tailback and Joe Whisler at fullback, but two of his key veterans, Tommy James and Tony Adamle, had left school to play professional football and the Bucks had a dismal 2–6–1 record, shut out four times and scoring only 60 points the entire season. Finishing last in the Big Ten for the only time in team history, only an improbable win against Northwestern had kept the record from matching 1897's worst ever. Trailing the Wildcats 6–0 and having already turned the ball over on downs with two minutes to play, Ohio State threw an interception on what was apparently the last play of the game, but a penalty gave the Buckeyes an extra play after time had expired. That too was stopped and again negated by penalty. The Bucks then tied the game on a pass, only to have the try for extra point blocked. Again a penalty negated the play, and on the fourth extra play of the game the Buckeyes made the conversion and won 7–6. Although again hurt by players leaving to play pro football, Ohio State improved greatly in 1948, winning six games and losing three in a year when the Big Ten was an exceptionally strong conference. In 1949 the Buckeyes overcame an early lopsided loss to Minnesota to go on to a successful season, due in great part to the play of sophomore Vic Janowicz. Tying Michigan in Ann Arbor to become Big Ten co-champions, Ohio State also received the Rose Bowl invitation, where they came from behind to defeat California. 1950 was thought to be a rebuilding year for Ohio State after 21 seniors on the 1949 team graduated but that team's sophomores were a very strong class, having been recruited in part by an alumni organization known as "The Front-Liners", and Vic Janowicz was moved to quarterback. Fesler, rumored to be resigning because of pressures associated with the position and abuse of his family by anonymous critics, returned to coach the Buckeyes on a run for a national championship. Fesler's 5–4–2 defense while strong against the run, proved vulnerable to the pass, and an opening game matchup between Janowicz and SMU's Kyle Rote (the recipient and runner-up, respectively, for the 1950 Heisman Trophy) was lost when the Mustangs overcame a 17-point deficit with four touchdown passes. Fesler responded by playing Janowicz at halfback again, although he continued to be a serious passing threat to opposing teams, and Ohio State won six games in a row, most by wide margins, to move into the top ranking in the AP poll. However, the season fell completely apart in the final two games when the Buckeyes turned the ball over seven times in a loss to Illinois, and in a game known to Ohio State fans as the "Snow Bowl", lost to Michigan 9–3 in a blizzard. The teams punted a combined 45 times and all the scoring—a Janowicz field goal and a safety and touchdown for Michigan—resulted from blocked punts. Fesler's decision to punt on third down with 47 seconds remaining in the first half, recovered for a touchdown by Michigan, was severely criticized. Two weeks after the Snow Bowl, citing concerns about his health and family, Fesler resigned to go into real estate. Less than two months later, however, he was named head coach at Minnesota. Detractors of Ohio State in general and Woody Hayes in particular have cited Fesler as a victim of unremitting abuse by "big football" at Ohio State but throughout the 1950 season speculation that Minnesota's Bernie Bierman would retire had repeatedly suggested that Fesler was a prime candidate for his replacement. While newspaper references to the "Buckeyes" date back to at least 1919, it was not until 1950 that the school officially adopted "Buckeyes" as the nickname of its athletic teams.

=== Woody Hayes era (1951–1978) ===
The search for a coach to replace Wes Fesler was in some ways a replay of the talent search to replace Francis Schmidt: Paul Brown, even though he had become a successful coach on the professional level, was the immediate "favorite" and had a well-organized corps of supporters boosting his cause. As in 1940, the Ohio High School Football Coaches Association voiced their support for Brown early on. However Brown had also alienated many Buckeye alumni by failing to return to the coaching position reserved for him at the end of World War II, and the athletics department by signing Buckeye players, Lou Groza chief among them, to professional contracts before their college eligibility had ended. A unanimous vote of the board of trustees endorsed the choice of the selection committee and on February 18, 1951, named as head coach Wayne Woodrow Hayes, who had achieved success as head coach of both his alma mater Denison University and Miami (Ohio). Hayes, ironically, had not been the committee's first choice. The head coach of Missouri, Don Faurot, had been offered and accepted the position a week earlier, but changed his mind two days later. Going into his first season, Hayes thus did not enjoy widespread support among Ohio State's following. Hayes had Janowicz returning for his senior year but he converted the Buckeye offense from single-wing to T-formation, limiting the tailback's effectiveness. He also instituted a demanding practice regimen and was both aggressive and vocal in enforcing it, alienating many players accustomed to Fesler's laid-back style. With the exception on a blowout of Iowa in mid-season, the 1951 Buckeyes were a low-scoring team that won 4, lost 3 (including a 7–0 loss to Michigan), and tied 2, leaving many to question the ability of the new coach. In 1952, however, Hayes continued his transformation of the team, playing Howard "Hopalong" Cassady as a freshman and installing a split-T offense. The Buckeyes nearly doubled their point production, improved to 6–3, and recorded their first victory over Michigan in eight years, 27–7. The 1953 team was expected to improve further but also finished 6–3 when they were shut out by Michigan, and critics called for the replacement of Hayes. In 1954 (even with Cassady now a seasoned junior) the Buckeyes were picked to finish no higher than 5th in the Big Ten. Athletic Director Dick Larkins, a Hayes defender, hired Lyal Clark back from Minnesota, where he had gone with Fesler, to coach the Buckeye defense, allowing Hayes to concentrate on offense and easing the pressure Hayes inevitably put on his assistants. That season no opponent scored more than two touchdowns on the Buckeyes, and seven of the ten were held to a touchdown or less. An 88-yard interception return by Cassady against second-ranked Wisconsin and a 4th quarter goal-line stand inside its own one-yard line against Michigan propelled Ohio State to a perfect season that included a 20–7 victory over USC in the Rose Bowl. Woody Hayes won his first and the team's second national championship. In 1955 Hopalong Cassady won the Heisman Trophy, and the team again took the Big Ten championship with a 7–2 record, set an attendance record of 490,477, and won in Ann Arbor for the first time in 18 years with a 17–0 shutout in which Michigan crossed the 50-yard line only once, on a penalty. Ohio State passed only three times in the game; the sole reception was the only completion in the final three games of the year, leading to characterization of Hayes' style of offensive play as "three yards and a cloud of dust".

In its issue of October 24, 1955, Sports Illustrated, through an article by Robert Shaplen, stated that Hayes had used money he received from his weekly television show to make small personal loans to financially needy players on his team for expenses such as clothing and travel expenses, stating:

Once signed, a recruit can count on some financial help from Hayes if he is "in need". Woody insists that he never forks up for a luxury- another narrow line- but it's certainly also true that he makes sure he won't lose any valuable men by financial default.

The article resulted in an immediate furor over possible violations of NCAA rules, although Hayes insisted that the loans were made with his own personal funds and were to be repaid, and in effect plead ignorance of the rules. The faculty council, followed by the Big Ten and the NCAA, conducted lengthy investigations which went beyond the scope of the original allegations, and on April 26, 1956, Big Ten Commissioner Kenneth "Tug" Wilson found Hayes and the program guilty of violations and placed it on a year's probation, making all Buckeye sports teams ineligible for play in NCAA tournaments. The 1956 season became one of mixed results. The Buckeyes began the season strong with impressive wins over Nebraska and Stanford, and won their Big Ten opener for their eighth victory in a row. The next week they were upset, however, in Ohio Stadium by three-touchdown underdog Penn State, on a missed extra point (and Penn State had been scheduled only after Navy had canceled its game with Ohio State). Ohio State ran its conference game win streak to a record 17 with a victory over Indiana on November 10, but then lost back-to-back to Iowa and Michigan, both by shutouts and the first time a Hayes-coached team had lost 2 in a row. The Iowa game was marked by intemperate verbal exchanges between Iowa coach Forest Evashevski and Hayes over the condition of the field in Iowa Stadium, allegedly unmowed to slow down the Buckeyes. Iowa won the game, the Big Ten championship, and the Rose Bowl that followed. In 1957 four Big Ten teams were picked in pre-season polls to finish in the Top 10, but Ohio State was not one of them, and in their opener, the Buckeyes lost to TCU, their third defeat in a row. For the only time in its history, however, the team won all of its remaining games after an opening loss to claim the Big Ten championship, win the Rose Bowl over Oregon, and share a national championship title with Auburn. Hayes was also named Coach of the Year. Perhaps the most noted game during the season was the rematch with Iowa, which entered the game undefeated, higher-ranked, and a six-point favorite. Ohio State had lost its starting halfback, Don Clark, to a leg injury the week before, and with the discord between the coaches well-publicized, the week leading up to the game took on the frenzy of Michigan Week. The game drew a then-record attendance in Ohio Stadium, including Vice-President of the United States Richard Nixon, and the Buckeyes beat Iowa 17–13 on a late 4th quarter drive featuring sophomore fullback Bob White. Nixon met Hayes after the game and the two became lifelong friends. In the ensuing years the Buckeyes finished 3rd twice and 8th once—the first of his two losing seasons at Ohio State. In 1961 the team went undefeated to be named national champions by the FWAA but a growing conflict between academics and athletics over Ohio State's reputation as a "football school" came to a head when the faculty council voted on November 28 to decline the invitation to the Rose Bowl extended to the team (although they also voted to accept its share of the gate receipts). Nearly a year would pass before the council would rescind the decision, after much public protest and debate. Over the next 6 seasons Ohio State finished no higher than 2nd, and had a losing season in 1966, although it did beat Michigan four times. When it lost three of its first five games in 1967 (all at home), public speculation that Hayes would be replaced as coach grew to its highest point since 1953. Jack Park, author of the program's official history, states that decision to turn down the Rose Bowl had "strongly impaired...(Ohio State)'s recruiting within its own state".

The Class of 1970 was one of the strongest to ever play for Ohio State, and came within two games of three consecutive undisputed national championships, losing only in what may have been the bitterest loss in Buckeye history to arch-rival Michigan in 1969 and again in the 1971 Rose Bowl to Stanford. In 1968 Hayes regularly played 13 members during their sophomore season (ten as starters), a practice he had once predicted would cost a loss per sophomore played. While the 1968 team also returned a significant number of veteran players, particularly the offensive line, the Class of 1970 had such an impact on the season that they became known as the "super sophomores." Ohio State opened the season with four wins at home, defeating SMU, Oregon, Purdue and Northwestern. The Big Ten opener matched them against the number one-ranked Boilermakers and although threatened three times in the first half, Purdue held Ohio State scoreless. In the 3rd quarter junior Ted Provost intercepted a pass, returning it for a touchdown, and after sophomore starting quarterback Rex Kern was injured, senior Bill Long, who had quarterbacked the team the previous two seasons, returned to score the decisive final touchdown in the 13–0 upset. The Buckeyes continued to an undefeated season that saw wins over four ranked teams (three in the top ten), a 50–14 rout of Michigan, and a Rose Bowl victory over the USC Trojans that resulted in the national championship. The winning streak carried over to the 1969 season and reached 22 games as Ohio State traveled to Michigan. The Buckeyes had encountered little trouble disposing of every team on its schedule, unlike 1968 when a number of games had been closely contested, winning eight games by an average score of 46–9. Despite the fact that Michigan came into the game ranked twelfth and had outscored its four most recent opponents 178–22, the Buckeyes were 17-point favorites. Because of a "no-repeat" policy in the Big Ten regarding the Rose Bowl and guaranteed no worse than a co-championship of the conference, the number one-ranked Buckeyes were playing for a perfect record. Michigan was directed by first-year coach Bo Schembechler, a former Hayes protégé. Michigan shocked the Buckeyes and led 24–12 at the half, then totally shutdown the defending champions in the second half, intercepting six Buckeye passes. The 24–12 upset was one of the most significant in college football history, and arguably the greatest in the rivalry. The super sophomores included three-year starters Rex Kern, Jack Tatum, Jim Stillwagon, John Brockington, Mike Sensibaugh, Jan White, Bruce Jankowski, Tim Anderson, Larry Zelina, Mike Vladich, Doug Adams, and Mark Debevc. Kern, Tatum, and Stillwagon have since been inducted into the College Football Hall of Fame.

The 1969 loss to Michigan initiated what came to be known as "The Ten Year War", in which the rivalry, which pitted some of OSU's and UM's strongest teams ever, rose to the uppermost level of all sports and the competition between Schembechler and Hayes became legendary. Four times between 1970 and 1975, Ohio State and Michigan were both ranked in the top five of the AP Poll before their matchup. The Wolverines entered every game during those years undefeated and won only once, a 10–7 victory in Ann Arbor on November 20, 1971. Both teams used the annual game as motivation for entire seasons and after the initial win by Michigan, played dead even at four wins and a tie apiece. Hayes had the upper hand during the first part of the war, in which Ohio State won the conference championship and went to the Rose Bowl four straight years, while Michigan won the final three. It was also an era in which through television Ohio State football again came to the forefront of national attention. Hayes set the tone in spring practice in 1970, placing a rug at the entrance to the Buckeye dressing room emblazoned with the words: "1969 MICH 24 OSU 12 — 1970 MICH:__ OSU:__" as a constant reminder of their objective. The "super sophomores", now seniors, used a strong fullback-oriented offense to smash their way through the season undefeated, struggling only with Purdue the week before the Michigan game. The return match in Columbus found both teams undefeated and untied, a "first" in the history of the rivalry, with Michigan ranked fourth and Ohio State fifth. Ohio State combined a powerful defense that held Michigan to only 37 yards rushing, a rushing offense employing two tight ends as blockers, and a 26-yard touchdown pass from Kern to Bruce Jankowski to win 20–9. The Buckeyes returned to the Rose Bowl to be upset by Stanford 27–17. The "super sophomores" had garnered a record of 27–2, the best winning percentage of any three-year period in team history, and won or shared the Big Ten title all three years. The National Football Foundation named Ohio State its national champion for 1970. 1971 was less successful than the preceding seasons, but the middle four years of the 10-year war saw the greatest success for Hayes against Michigan, although the teams fell short of repeating their 1968 national championship. Archie Griffin began his college football career in 1972, taking advantage of new NCAA eligibility rules that allowed freshmen to compete at the varsity level. In his second game, sent in against North Carolina late in the first quarter, Griffin set a new Buckeye rushing record with 239 yards and led the team in rushing for the season with 867.

The following season Hayes installed an I-formation attack with Griffin at tailback and fellow sophomore Cornelius Greene at quarterback. The Buckeyes went undefeated with a powerful offense and equally impenetrable defense, achieving an average margin of victory of 31 points a game. The only blemish on their record was a 10–10 tie with Michigan after both teams had entered the game unbeaten. (The tie was more galling for the Wolverines, however, as the Big Ten selected Ohio State to represent the conference in the Rose Bowl.) Despite soundly defeating defending national champion USC, however, the tie with Michigan resulted in the Buckeyes finishing second to Notre Dame in the final AP rankings. Griffin, Randy Gradishar, Van DeCree, and John Hicks were named All-Americans; Hicks, an offensive tackle, not only won both the Outland and Lombardi Awards, but placed second in the Heisman Trophy competition. 1974 and 1975 were seasons of both elation and frustration. The Buckeyes twice more defeated Michigan and went to two Rose Bowls, but lost both. The 1974 team seemed bound for another national championship when it was derailed by a loss to unranked Michigan State (Ohio State lost only twice in the regular season during Griffin's 4-year career, both to the Spartans), and the next year the #1-ranked Bucks lost 23–10 to 11th-ranked UCLA in the 1976 Rose Bowl. In all the Buckeyes were 40–5–1 from 1972 to 1975, winning the Big Ten all four years and never losing to Michigan, but each loss and the tie were crucial in failing to win another championship. Archie Griffin, however, received the Heisman Trophy for both years, off-setting much of the frustration, and amassed 5,589 yards in his career. The falloff in success of Hayes' last three years was not great. His teams forged records of 9–2–1, 9–3, and 7–4–1, and made bowl appearances in all three years (the rules had changed to allow appearances in bowls other than the Rose Bowl). However frustrations in losing three straight years to Michigan, and other factors, resulted in growing criticism of Hayes and his methods, particularly his on-the-field fits of temper. Even so, his downfall was sudden and shocking when near the end of the nationally televised Gator Bowl, Hayes punched Clemson middle guard Charlie Bauman after Bauman intercepted a pass to kill Ohio State's last chance to win. Hayes was fired after the game by Ohio State president Harold Enarson and athletic director Hugh Hindman.

=== Earle Bruce era (1979–1987) ===
Hayes was replaced by a former protégé, Iowa State head coach Earle Bruce. Bruce inherited a strong team led by sophomore quarterback Art Schlichter but that had also lost eleven starters, and the 1979 squad exceeded pre-season expectations, ending the 3-year loss drought against Michigan and going to the Rose Bowl with an opportunity once again to be national champions. The Buckeyes lost both by a single point, 17–16, but Bruce was named Coach of the Year. His success was hailed by those in the media who saw it as a rebuke of Hayes and the start of a "new era". 1980, however, saw the start of a trend that eventually brought criticism to Bruce, when Ohio State finished with a 9–3 record, the first of six consecutive years at 9–3. Though each of these seasons, and the 10–3 season that followed them, culminated in a bowl game, Ohio State did not appear to be any closer to a national championship than during the end of the Hayes era. Bruce's teams were not without impact players, however. All-Americans and future National Football League stars included Keith Byars, Cris Carter, Chris Spielman, John Frank, Jim Lachey, Tom Tupa, Marcus Marek, and Pepper Johnson. His program was also known for the number of notable assistant coaches on staff, including Jim Tressel, Glen Mason, Pete Carroll, Nick Saban, Urban Meyer and Dom Capers. The 1980 team was selected as the top-ranked team of the pre-season AP poll and opened the season with four games at home, but were shocked in the fourth game by UCLA, shut out 17–0. The team rebounded to win its next six easily, but then were shut down by a ball-control Michigan team that allowed the Buckeyes only 23 minutes with the ball, then lost again to Penn State in the Fiesta Bowl.

In 1981, Ohio State opened strong, including a victory at Stanford in which senior Art Schlichter out-dueled John Elway, but then lost back-to-back games to Florida State and Wisconsin (their first victory over the Buckeyes in 22 games). The Buckeyes continued to struggle on defense, losing a third time, at Minnesota. Victories over Michigan to gain a share of the Big Ten championship and over Navy in the Liberty Bowl salvaged the season. For the first time since 1922 the Buckeyes lost three in a row in Ohio Stadium in 1982, including rematches with Stanford and Florida State, and for the second year in a row to Wisconsin, but then won seven straight, the last over BYU in the Holiday Bowl. Sophomore running back Keith Byars had a stand-out season in 1983, rushing for 1,199 yards, and Ohio State defeated the Oklahoma Sooners in Norman, but three losses in conference meant a 4th-place finish. 1984 witnessed what Bruce called "the greatest comeback after the worst start" when Ohio State fell behind Illinois 24–0 at home but roared back on 274 yards rushing and five touchdowns by Byars to win 45–38. Ohio State also defeated Michigan to win an outright Big Ten championship. Byars led the nation in rushing and scoring but finished second in Heisman balloting. Byars broke his toe just prior to the start of the 1985 season, ending his Heisman hopes and seriously handicapping the Buckeye attack. He returned against Purdue with Ohio State at 4–1 and scored twice, but then re-injured his foot the next week against Minnesota. Iowa was top-ranked nationally when they came into Ohio Stadium favored to end the longest home winning streak in the country, and were the first #1 team the Buckeyes faced since Purdue in 1968. Ohio State's defense dominated with four pass interceptions to win 22–13.

In 1986 Bruce received a 3-year contract, the first for the modern program but the team opened with two losses, which had not occurred in over 90 years. The Buckeyes then won 9 in a row before Michigan took a close game when kicker Matt Frantz missed a field goal with a minute to play. After the season Bruce was offered the position of head coach at the University of Arizona with a 5-year contract but was persuaded to stay at his alma mater by Athletic Director Rick Bay. Hopes for a standout season in 1987 suffered a serious setback when All-American wide receiver Cris Carter was dropped from the team for signing with an agent. Indiana defeated Ohio State for the first time since 1951, 31–10, in a game that came to be known as the "darkest day", and Ohio State lost three conference games in a row going into the Michigan game. On the Monday of Michigan week, after a weekend of rumors and speculation, Ohio State President Edward Jennings fired Bruce but tried to keep the dismissal secret until after the end of the season. Bay, who had been instrumental in keeping Bruce at Ohio State, disregarded Jennings' orders and announced the firing and his own resignation in protest. Jennings made his own situation worse by refusing to give a reason for the firing and the circumstances have been the subject of controversy since. The Buckeyes enjoyed an emotional come-from-behind victory over Michigan in Ann Arbor after the entire team wore headbands bearing the word "EARLE", then declined an invitation to play in the Sun Bowl.

=== John Cooper era (1988–2000) ===
John Cooper was hired as the 21st football head coach at Ohio State before the end of 1987 and before he had coached his last game at Arizona State University. Cooper's head coaching record at ASU and at Tulsa prior to that stood out among his credentials, as did a victory over Michigan in the 1987 Rose Bowl. Cooper's thirteen years as Buckeye head coach are largely remembered in the litany of negative statistics associated with him: a notorious 2–10–1 record against Michigan, a 3–8 record in bowl games, a 5-year losing streak to Illinois to start his term and a 6–7 record overall, and blowing a 15-point 3rd quarter lead in a 28–24 loss to unranked Michigan State when the Buckeyes were the top-ranked team in the nation and en route to a national championship. However his record also has many positives: back-to-back victories over Notre Dame, two finishes second-ranked in the polls, and three Big Ten championships (albeit shared). Cooper also recruited 15 players who first-round draft picks in the National Football League. Both 1988 and 1989 began identically: an impressive season-opening win followed by an embarrassing loss to a highly regarded team (Pitt and USC); a rebound win against two other highly regarded programs (LSU and Boston College) followed by a loss to Illinois in the conference opener. However 1988 saw Ohio State lose its first three conference games and a close game at home against Michigan for a 4–6–1 record, its first losing season in 22 years. In 1989 the Buckeyes won 6 consecutive Big Ten games before losing its last two to go 8–4. The most noteworthy victory occurred in Minneapolis when Ohio State overcame a 31–0 deficit to Minnesota to win 41–37. 1990 continued the pattern with a 2-win 2-loss start and an overall 7–4–1 record that included an embarrassing loss to Air Force in the Liberty Bowl. 1991 was 9–4, notable primarily as the season that sophomore running back Robert Smith quit the team. 1992, with senior Kirk Herbstreit at quarterback, was 8–3–1, but the losing string to Michigan was broken with a 13–13 tie. Persistent rumors that Cooper would resign or be fired were laid to rest when University President Gordon Gee announced he would return in 1993.

The next 6 seasons were very successful, winning ten or more games in 5 of the 6 and sharing the conference championship in three. Eddie George won the Heisman Trophy in 1995 after a tremendous senior season, Ohio State defeated Notre Dame in 1995 and 1996, and won half its bowl games. But in three seasons (1993, 1995, and 1996) the Buckeyes entered the Michigan game undefeated, with the possibility of a national championship in at least one, and lost all three to underdog Wolverine teams. Ohio State had won 62 games and lost only 12, but a third of those were to Michigan. After renewing his contract and becoming a member of the "million dollar coaching club", Cooper started sophomore Austin Moherman against the Miami Hurricanes in the nationally televised Kickoff Classic and was soundly beaten. That presaged a mediocre 1999 season in which the Buckeyes finished 6-6, ending their successful 90's run. This was the year where the Wisconsin Badgers spanked the Buckeyes with a 42-17 loss, scoring 42 points in the second half of the game. After the game, coach Cooper quipped to the press "That was a good old-fashioned butt-kicking". The 2000 team was more successful, going 8–4, but criticism of Cooper among fans had risen to a clamor again and touched on many areas of the program beyond specific game records. The negative publicity rose to a peak in the days leading up to Ohio State's matchup with South Carolina in the Outback Bowl, when wide receiver Reggie Germany was suspended for having a 0.0 GPA, team captain Matt Wilhelm publicly criticized fellow player Ken-Yon Rambo, and one Buckeye lineman sued another. On January 3, 2001, the Ohio State University dismissed Cooper. His loss in the Outback Bowl to a team that had not even won a single game the year before was a factor in his subsequent firing, as was negative publicity regarding player behavior before and during the game. Other contributing factors included the record against Michigan (which was actually considered by most people to be the biggest reason for his firing), a reputation of inability to win "big games", the lack of a national championship, the perception of him as an outsider by many alumni, the poor bowl game record, and finally a perceived lack of discipline on the team.

=== Jim Tressel era (2001–2010) ===
Ohio State quickly sought a replacement for Cooper before the 2001 recruiting season, and after a nationwide search hired Jim Tressel. With a winning tradition at Youngstown State (4 NCAA Division I-AA National Champions from 1986 to 2000) Tressel, formerly an assistant coach at Ohio State for Earle Bruce, was an Ohioan who was considered to be appreciative of the Buckeyes' football tradition. Although there were some doubts whether Tressel could repeat his earlier success at the Division 1A level, most fans and alumni met the coaching change with enthusiasm. The day of his hiring, Jim Tressel, speaking to fans and students at a Buckeye basketball game, made a prophetic implication that he would lead the Buckeyes to beat Michigan in Ann Arbor the following November. Tressel's first season was difficult as the Buckeyes went 7–5. At a university that was accustomed to experiencing fewer than 2 or 3 losses a season, 2001 was considered a disappointment until Tressel made good on his promise and did what his predecessor could not, beating Michigan in Ann Arbor. Even more impressive was that Tressel gave the quarterback reins to untested sophomore Craig Krenzel after senior starter Steve Bellisari was suspended following a DWI arrest just prior to the Illinois game, a decision applauded as finally drawing the line on a program perceived as "getting out of hand". Despite its average record, Ohio State elected to accept an invitation to the Outback Bowl for a rematch with South Carolina. Although Ohio State lost this game also, it was marked by a strong second half comeback and were a presentiment that 33 years of frustration at not winning a national championship were about to come to an immediate end.

While fans were optimistic about the chance for success of the 2002 team, most observers were surprised by the Ohio State's National Championship. After good offensive performances against Texas Tech and Kent State, and the emergence of freshman Maurice Clarett as a standout running back, Ohio State used strong defense, ball-control play-calling, and field position tactics to win numerous close games, a style of play characterized as "Tresselball", and disparaged by detractors as "the Luckeyes". One of the most notable examples occurred against Purdue on November 9, when quarterback Craig Krenzel threw a 4th down touchdown pass to Michael Jenkins late in the game to win, on a play that has gone down in Buckeye lore as "Holy Buckeye", a phrase coined by ABC Television's Brent Musburger's during his call of the play. (Buckeye Commentary - Holy Buckeye) A dramatic second-straight victory over Michigan propelled them into the BCS National Championship Game at the Fiesta Bowl, where they beat the Miami Hurricanes in two overtimes in one of the greatest championship games in college football history. Following their championship season, Tressel and the school administration became entangled in a major controversy over allegations of NCAA violations by tailback Maurice Clarett. Clarett accused Tressel of orchestrating a benefits system, including free cars, cash for no-work jobs, and improper academic assistance. However, the NCAA was unable to verify the claims due to a lack of evidence. In 2004, however, Troy Smith's acceptance of $500 from former OSU booster Robert Q. Baker led to a 2-game suspension from the team, which continued into the 2005 season. The businessman was also sanctioned.

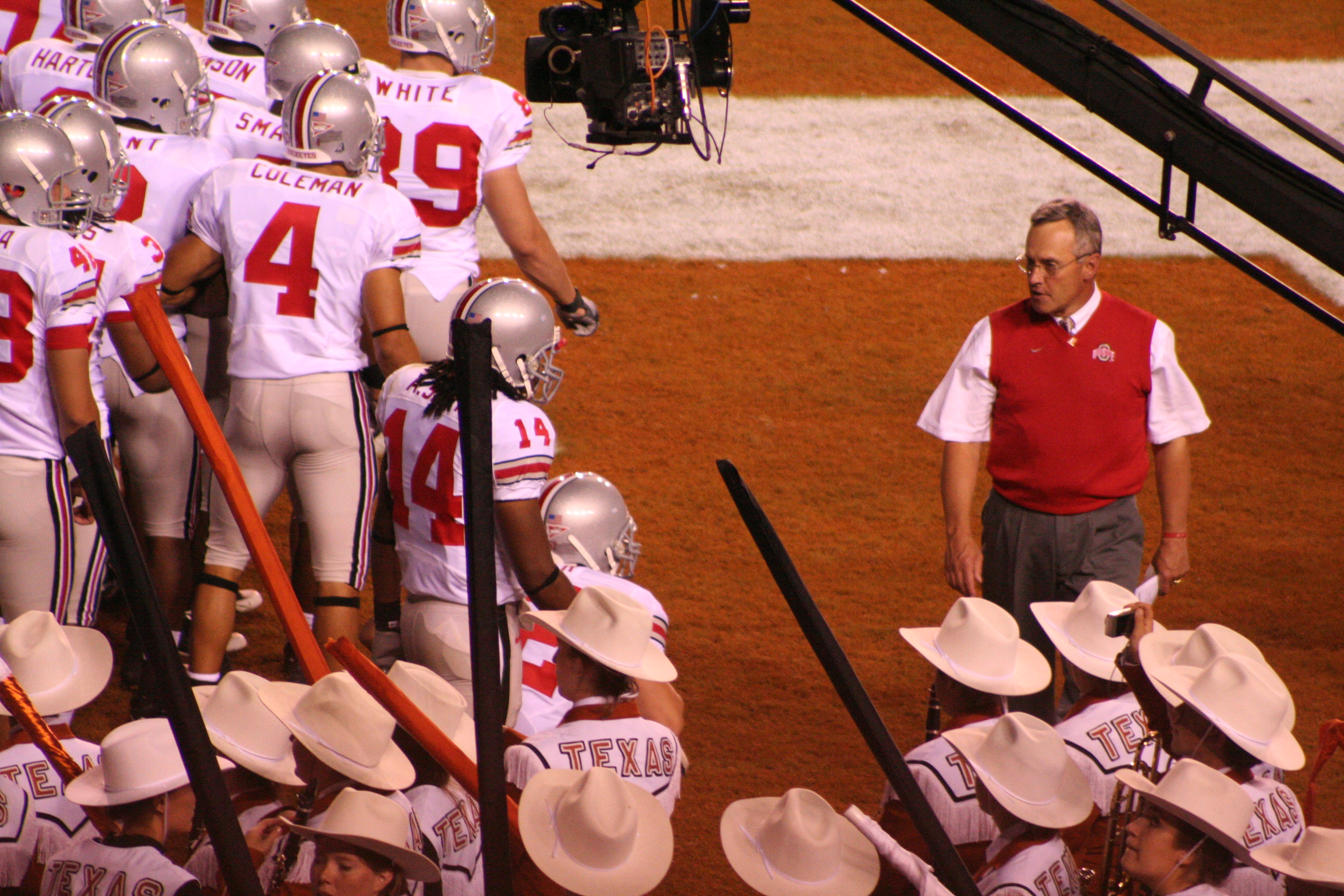
Jim Tressel and team at halftime of the 2006 game at Texas.

Tressel's success continued with two additional Big Ten championships in 2005 and 2006 (the 2006 title outright) and a record through the 2006 regular season of 62–14. The 2005 team was characterized by slow development of the offense and early losses to Texas and Penn State, followed by an offensive explosion that saw the Buckeyes score 40 or more points in five consecutive games, the first time in the team's history. The Buckeyes again defeated Michigan in Ann Arbor and then Notre Dame in the Fiesta Bowl. However, after posting a 12–0 regular season in 2006, and going wire-to-wire during the regular season as the top-ranked team to advance to the BCS National Championship game on January 8, 2007, the Buckeyes endured a shocking defeat to the Florida Gators, 41–14. In the spring of 2007, the NCAA released figures on the football program's Academic Progress Rate (APR) that showed an increase its score from the penalty cut-off point of 925 to 928. Following the loss to Florida, the team lost senior Troy Smith to the end of his college eligibility and juniors Ted Ginn Jr., Antonio Pittman, and Anthony Gonzalez to the NFL. Preseason speculation in the sports media anticipated a finish in 2007 of no higher than 3rd in the Big Ten. However, playing what was sometimes criticized as a weak schedule, and behind the statistically best defense among Bowl Series teams, Ohio State finished the season at 11–1, its only defeat in its final home game, against Illinois. Despite this, numerous defeats of top-ranked teams propelled Ohio State back into the top position in the BCS. On January 7, 2008, it lost its second straight BCS National Championship game, this time to the LSU Tigers by a score of 38–24.

The following season would see the arrival of heavily recruited high school quarterback Terrelle Pryor at Ohio State. After a 35–3 loss to the USC Trojans, Pryor would get the starting job at quarterback, replacing senior Todd Boeckman. The next three seasons would see the Buckeyes amass a 31–5 record, win or share three Big Ten championships, and win two BCS bowls. In late 2010, however it was found that five Buckeye players, including Pryor, had improperly sold memorabilia to the owner of a tattoo parlor. The players were to be suspended for the first five games of the 2011–12 season. There were calls for Tressell to suspend the players for the 2011 Sugar Bowl. Tressel decided against it however, and the Buckeyes went on to claim 31–26 victory over Arkansas and their fifth BCS bowl victory since hiring Tressel. In March 2011, it was discovered that Tressel had prior knowledge of the violations committed by his players, and he was suspended for the first five games of the next season. However, after months of intense criticism and damning reports, school officials called Tressel back early from a Memorial Day vacation and forced his resignation on May 31, 2011. Assistant coach, and former Buckeye player, Luke Fickell was hired as the interim coach for the 2011–2012 season. Tressel left Ohio State as its third-winningest coach and won or shared 7 Big Ten titles (including 2010 title vacated by NCAA).

=== Luke Fickell era (2011) ===
On July 8, 2011, Ohio State University decided to vacate all victories from the 2010 football season as self-imposed punishment for major NCAA violations. Former coach Jim Tressel received more than $52,000 from the university and didn't have to pay a $250,000 fine for his involvement in the scandal. His status was also changed from "Resigned" to "Retired" in keeping with his wishes to "remain a Buckeye for life". Ohio State named Luke Fickell head coach for the 2011 season following Tressel's resignation, and Fickell coached the 2011 Buckeyes to a 6–7 record; going 6–6 in the regular season and losing in the Gator Bowl to Florida.

=== Urban Meyer era (2012–2018) ===
On November 28, 2011, Ohio State announced that Urban Meyer was hired as head coach. Despite the program being on probation for NCAA violations and prohibited from appearing in a bowl for the 2012 season, the Buckeyes overcame a rash of injuries on defense in a season reminiscent of 2002 and completed a perfect 12–0 season with a victory over Michigan on November 24, 26–21. Again, in 2013, Meyer and the Buckeyes continued their winning streak by finished 12–0 in the regular season before falling to the Michigan State Spartans 34–24 in the 2013 Big Ten Football Championship Game. The team would go on to face Clemson Tigers in the 2013 Orange Bowl where they would lose 40–35 to end the season 12–2.

Going into the 2014 season, expectations where high due to the return of quarterback Braxton Miller. This changed when he was injured during spring practice and would be forced to sit out the season. Redshirt Freshman J. T. Barrett would take over. In only the second game of the season, the Buckeye fell 35–21 to Virginia Tech Hokies, dropping them from No. 8 to No. 22 in the AP Poll. Following the loss, the Buckeyes began to find their way due in a large part to the Meyer-style offense. Ohio State would win nine in a row with Barrett before he broke his leg in the Michigan–Ohio State game. Cardale Jones would replace him and lead OSU to the Michigan win and a 59–0 stomping of the Wisconsin Badgers in the 2014 Big Ten Football Championship Game. The Buckeye would end up making the inaugural College Football Playoff as the No. 4 seed and would face No. 1 Alabama in the 2014 Sugar Bowl. Though Alabama was seen as favorites, Meyer would defeat the Crimson Tide 42–35 behind Jones and running back Ezekiel Elliott. The team would follow up with another great performance against No. 2 Oregon winning the 2015 College Football Playoff National Championship 42–20. The next season brought with it expectations of a repeat championship as Ohio State returned many of its starters from the previous year. A quarterback controversy between Jones and Barrett emerged with Jones getting the nod to eventually be replaced by Barrett. Ohio State would go on to compile a 13–1 record, with a crucial loss to Michigan State keeping them out of the College Football Playoff. In 2016, in spite of having the fewest returning starters of any team in the country, Ohio State would go on to win 11 games, but ultimately losing to Penn State in the regular season. The Playoff Committee chose Ohio State over Penn State to face Clemson in the Fiesta Bowl as part of the CFP semifinals. Clemson would win in a crushing 31–0 defeat. The 2017 season would again feature Barrett as the quarterback where they would go 10–2 in the regular season and win the 2017 Big Ten Football Championship Game against No. 3 Wisconsin. Ohio State's repeat of appearing in the playoffs where dashed when the committee chose 11–1 Alabama over the 11–2 Buckeyes. Ohio State would go on to face No.8 USC in the 2017 Cotton Bowl Classic, winning 24–7.

On August 1, 2018, Meyer was placed on administrative leave by Ohio State, after reports surfaced that Meyer knew about spousal abuse allegations against assistant coach Zach Smith prior to Smith's firing the week prior. After an independent investigative panel reviewed the evidence, the Ohio State Board of Trustees found that Meyer and Ohio State University Athletic Director Gene Smith did not uphold the values of the university. On August 22, the board voted to suspend Meyer for the opening three games of the season for the Buckeyes. He missed the team's games against Oregon State, Rutgers and TCU. Ryan Day, would act as the head coach in his absence. The Buckeyes would go on to finish 12–1 winning the Big Ten and getting a 2019 Rose Bowl invite to play Washington. On December 4, 2018, the university announced that Meyer would retire following the Rose Bowl due to increasing medical issues.

=== Ryan Day era (2019–present) ===
Following the retirement of Urban Meyer, offensive coordinator Ryan Day was promoted and named the 25th head coach of the Buckeyes. This was following a successful 3-game stint as acting head coach during Meyer's suspension. In 2019, Day's first season as a full-time head coach, he led the Buckeyes to a perfect 12–0 regular season record, the Buckeye's first undefeated regular season since 2013. Despite being predicted to finish second in the Big Ten East Division according to the 2019 Cleveland.com preseason poll, the Buckeyes clinched the division following their November 23 victory over rival Penn State, and secured a spot in the Big Ten Championship, which they would go on to win, beating Wisconsin 34–21. The Buckeyes were named the number two seed in the College Football Playoff and lost to the Clemson Tigers in the Fiesta Bowl. On December 3, 2019, Coach Day was named the Dave McClain Coach of the Year by the media.

Day's second season was significantly shortened due to the Big Ten Conference's policies regarding the COVID-19 pandemic. The Buckeyes' regular season was shortened from 12 games to 8 games, and then down to 5 because of cancellations due to the pandemic. After starting the season 4–0, Coach Day was forced to miss the December 5 game against Michigan State after testing positive for COVID-19., which the Buckeyes would go on to win 52–12. What would have been Ohio State's sixth regular season game, which was against archrival Michigan, was cancelled due to COVID-19 concerns within the Michigan program. This was the first time since the 1917 season that Ohio State and Michigan did not play each other. The Big Ten's coronavirus policies would have prevented the Buckeyes from playing in the 2020 Big Ten Football Championship Game, as they did not meet the six-game threshold put forth by the conference. However, on December 9, 2020, the Big Ten administrative council voted to remove the six game minimum, allowing Ohio State to advance to the conference championship. The Buckeyes played in the Big Ten Championship game on December 19, where they beat the Northwestern Wildcats 22–10. Ohio State was selected as the number 3 seed in the College Football Playoff, where they faced number 2 Clemson in the 2021 Sugar Bowl. Ohio State defeated Clemson 49–28, and advanced to the 2021 College Football Playoff National Championship, to face number 1 Alabama. The Buckeyes lost to Alabama 52–24.

The 2021 season, Day's third full season as head coach, began with the Buckeyes ranked fourth in both the AP and coaches' poll. After an early season upset by Oregon, Day lead Ohio State through a nine-game win streak behind Heisman Trophy finalist C. J. Stroud. Ohio State had wins against then 20th ranked Penn State and 5th ranked Michigan State. Going into the Michigan game, Ohio State was ranked 2nd and Michigan was ranked 5th by the College Football Playoff committee. Michigan defeated Ohio State for the first time since 2011. This loss effectively eliminated Ohio State from playoff contention. Ohio State was selected to play against Utah in the Rose Bowl. Ohio State won the Rose Bowl by a score of 48–45.

In 2022, Day led the team to an 11–0 record and was ranked #2 going into the Michigan game, which #3 Michigan would win 45–23 on November 26, 2022 (outscoring the Buckeyes 28–3 in the second half), in Ohio State's first loss to Michigan in Columbus since 2000, and first back–to–back losses to Michigan since 1999–2000. The Buckeyes would go on to play the defending national champion Georgia Bulldogs in the 2022 national semifinal game on New Year's Eve, taking a 14-point lead into the fourth quarter, but ultimately seeing their season come to an end with a 42–41 loss. Kicker Noah Ruggles' would-be game-winning field goal attempt sailed wide left just as the clock struck midnight on New Year's Day, 2023.

In 2023, Day led the team to an 11–0 record and was ranked #2 going into the Michigan game for the second consecutive year. This time, Michigan won by six points 30–24 on November 25, 2023. This marked the first three-game losing streak to Michigan since 1995–97. The Buckeyes were then invited to the 2023 Cotton Bowl, where they lost to the Missouri Tigers 14–3 on December 29, 2023.
