= 2023 Cotton Bowl Classic =

2023 Cotton Bowl Classic may refer to:

- 2023 Cotton Bowl Classic (January), a bowl game on January 2, 2023, following the 2022 season, between Tulane and USC
- 2023 Cotton Bowl Classic (December), a bowl game on December 29, 2023, following the 2023 season, between Missouri and Ohio State
