= 2023 Missouri Tigers football team =

American college football season

2023 Missouri Tigers football

Cotton Bowl Classic champion

Cotton Bowl Classic, W 14–3 vs. Ohio State
- Conference: Southeastern Conference
- Eastern Division

Ranking
- Coaches: No. 8
- AP: No. 8
- Record: 11–2 (6–2 SEC)
- Head coach: Eliah Drinkwitz (4th season)
- Offensive coordinator: Kirby Moore (1st season)
- Offensive scheme: Pistol
- Defensive coordinator: Blake Baker (2nd season)
- Co-defensive coordinator: D. J. Smith (2nd season)
- Base defense: 4–3
- Home stadium: Faurot Field

2023 Southeastern Conference football standings
	Conf.			Overall
Team	W		L	W		L
Eastern Division
No. 4 Georgia xy	8	–	0	13	–	1
No. 8 Missouri	6	–	2	11	–	2
No. 17 Tennessee	4	–	4	9	–	4
Kentucky	3	–	5	7	–	6
Florida	3	–	5	5	–	7
South Carolina	3	–	5	5	–	7
Vanderbilt	0	–	8	2	–	10
Western Division
No. 5 Alabama xy$^	8	–	0	12	–	2
No. 9 Ole Miss	6	–	2	11	–	2
No. 12 LSU	6	–	2	10	–	3
Texas A&M	4	–	4	7	–	6
Auburn	3	–	5	6	–	7
Mississippi State	1	–	7	5	–	7
Arkansas	1	–	7	4	–	8
Championship: Alabama 27, Georgia 24
^ – College Football Playoff participant; $ – Conference champion; x – Division champion/co-champions; y – Championship game participant; Rankings from AP Poll

The 2023 Missouri Tigers football team represented the University of Missouri in the Eastern Division of the Southeastern Conference (SEC) during the 2023 NCAA Division I FBS football season. The Tigers were led by Eliah Drinkwitz in his fourth season as their head coach. The Missouri football team played its home games at Faurot Field in Columbia, Missouri. 2023 was the final year of the Eastern Division, as Texas and Oklahoma would join the SEC in 2024.

Going into the season, Missouri was predicted to finish second to last in the SEC East by media covering SEC Football Media Days. Missouri began the season 3–0 after defeating No. 15 Kansas State on a Southeastern Conference record 61-yard field goal as time expired by Harrison Mevis. After two additional wins over Memphis and Vanderbilt and rising to No. 21 in the AP Poll, Missouri lost at home vs. No. 23 LSU to fall to 5–1. Back-to-back wins at No. 24 Kentucky and at home over South Carolina allowed Missouri to debut in the CFP Rankings at No. 12, leading up to a Week 10 showdown against No. 2 Georgia in Athens. Missouri played Georgia close, but ultimately lost 30–21 to fall to 7–2. A convincing win over No. 13 Tennessee at home the following week catapulted the Tigers into the No. 9 position in the College Football Playoff rankings. Missouri finished the regular season with 10 wins for the first time since 2014 after victories over Florida and Arkansas, and ranked No. 9 in all three ranking systems. The 2023 Tigers were led offensively by the St. Louis area trio of quarterback Brady Cook, running back Cody Schrader, and wide receiver Luther Burden III.

Missouri defeated No. 7 Ohio State 14–3 in the 2023 Cotton Bowl Classic, their first New Year's Six Bowl victory in program history. Brady Cook finished the season with 3,317 passing yards, Cody Schrader finished the season with 1,627 rushing yards (a single-season school record), and Luther Burden III finished the season with 1,212 receiving yards. This was only the second time in SEC history that a team had a 3,000 yard passer, a 1,500 yard rusher, and a 1,000 yard receiver (2015 Alabama being the other). The Tigers finished the season ranked No. 8 in both the AP poll and Coaches poll, their first top 10 finish since the 2013 season and third top 10 finish since the 2007 season.

== Offseason ==
Positions key
Offense	Defense	Special teams
QB — Quarterback; RB — Running back; FB — Fullback; WR — Wide receiver; TE — Tight end; OL — Offensive lineman; T — Tackle; G — Guard; C — Center	DL — Defensive lineman; DT — Defensive tackle (Note: Includes nose tackle (NT)); DE — Defensive end; EDGE — Edge rusher; LB — Linebacker (Note: Includes middle linebacker (MLB/MIKE), weakside linebacker (WILL), strongside linebacker (SAM), off-ball linebacker, and outside linebacker (OLB)); DB — Defensive back; CB — Cornerback; S — Safety (Note: Includes free safety (FS) and strong safety (SS))	K — Kicker (Note: Also known as a placekicker (PK)); P — Punter; LS — Long snapper; RS — Return specialist (Note: Includes kickoff and punt returners)

=== Team departures ===
2023 Missouri offseason departures
Name	Number	Pos.	Height/Weight	Hometown	Year	Notes
Devin Nicholson	#11	LB	6'3''/ 203	Detroit, Michigan	Senior	Transferred to Kent State
Trajan Jeffcoat	#18	DE	6'3''/ 220	Columbia, South Carolina	RS-Senior	Transferred to Arkansas
Elijah Young	#4	RB	5'9''/ 175	Knoxville, Tennessee	Junior	Transferred to Western Kentucky
Tauskie Dove	#1	WR	6'2''/ 200	Denton, Texas	RS-Senior	Transferred to Memphis
Jalani Williams	#4	S	6'2''/ 170	St. Louis, Missouri	Senior	Transferred to Kent State
Isaac Zatechka	#63	OL	6'4''/ 290	Omaha, Nebraska	RS-Sophomore	Transferred to North Dakota State
Dominic Lovett	#7	WR	5'10''/ 175	Belleville, Illinois	Junior	Transferred to Georgia
Tyler Macon	#10	QB	6'0''/ 200	St. Louis, Missouri	Sophomore	Transferred to Alcorn State
Jack Stonehouse	#97	P	6'3''/ 175	West Hills, California	Sophomore	Transferred to Syracuse
Zachary Lovett	#31	LB	6'2''/ 210	Rockledge, Florida	RS-Sophomore	Transferred to Iowa State
Hyrin White	#50	OT	6'7''/ 292	DeSoto, Texas	RS-Senior	Transferred to SMU
Travion Ford	#16	DE	6'4''/ 232	St. Louis, Missouri	RS-Sophomore	Transferred to Toledo
Davion Sistrunk	#34	CB	6'2''/ 170	Melbourne, Florida	Sophomore	Entered Transfer Portal
Les Hewitt	–	CB	6'3''/ 185	Palmetto, Florida	Freshman	Entered Transfer Portal
Darius Jackson	–	S	6'1''/ 175	Red Oak, Texas	RS-Sophomore	Transferred to Texas State
Daniel Robledo	#97	DL	6'5''/ 280	Tucson, Arizona	Junior	Entered Transfer Portal
Zach Hahn	#41	WR	5'11''/ 182	St. Louis, Missouri	RS-Sophomore	Transferred to Lindenwood
Luke Griffin	#54	OL	6'5''/ 330	Chatsworth, Georgia	RS-Senior	Transferred to Purdue
Taj Butts	#17	RB	5'10''/ 203	St. Louis, Missouri	RS-Sophomore	Entered Transfer Portal
Ian Mathews	#91	DL	6'4''/ 290	Columbus, Georgia	RS-Sophomore	Entered Transfer Portal
Marcus Scott II	#24	DB	5'11''/ 185	Houston, Texas	Sophomore	Transferred to California
Gavin McKay	#87	TE	6'5''/ 225	Memphis, Tennessee	RS-Sophomore	Transferred to Mercer
Arden Walker	#55	DL	6'2''/ 251	Denver, Colorado	RS-Sophomore	Transferred to Colorado
Isaiah McGuire	#9	DL	6'4''/ 274	Tulsa, Oklahoma	Senior	Graduated/ Entered 2023 NFL Draft
D.J. Coleman	#7	DL	6'5''/ 263	Atlanta, Georgia	Graduate Student	Graduated/ Entered 2023 NFL Draft
Martez Manuel	#3	S	6’0''/ 213	Columbia, Missouri	Senior	Graduated/ Entered 2023 NFL Draft
Barrett Banister	#11	WR	6'0''/ 195	Fayetteville, Arkansas	Graduate Student	Graduated
Jake Hoffman	#49	LS	6'3''/ 230	Kearney, Missouri	Senior	Graduated
Kibet Chepyator	#45	TE	6'7''/ 248	Carol Stream, Illinois	Graduate Student	Graduated
Sean Koetting	#90	K	6'4''/ 229	Columbia, Missouri	Graduate Student	Graduated

=== Incoming transfers ===
2023 Missouri incoming transfers
Name	Number	Pos.	Height/Weight	Hometown	Year	Notes
Jake Garcia	#6	QB	6'3''/ 195	Loganville, Georgia	Sophomore	Transferred from Miami (FL)
Joe Moore	#45	DE	6'2''/ 245	Florissant, Missouri	Junior	Transferred from Arizona State
Dannis Jackson	#11	WR	6'1''/ 187	Sumrall, Mississippi	Junior	Transferred from Ole Miss
Riley Williams	#97	P	6'3''/ 210	Victoria, Australia	Junior	Transferred from Towson
Tre'Vez Johnson	#4	S	5'11''/ 192	Jacksonville, Florida	Junior	Transferred from Florida
Marcellus Johnson	#50	OT	6'4''/ 270	Normal, Illinois	Graduate Student	Transferred from Eastern Michigan
Austin Firestone	–	DL	6'5''/ 265	Niceville, Florida	Freshman	Transferred from Northwestern
Theo Wease Jr.	#1	WR	6'2''/ 202	Allen, Texas	Senior	Transferred from Oklahoma
Marcus Clarke	#29	CB	5'10''/ 175	Winter Park, Florida	Senior	Transferred from Miami (FL)
Cam'Ron Johnson	–	OL	6'4''/ 305	Houston, Texas	Junior	Transferred from Houston

=== 2023 recruiting class ===
College recruiting
Name	Hometown	School	Height	Weight	Commit date
Brett Norfleet; TE	St. Charles, Missouri	Francis Howell High School	6 ft 7 in (2.01 m)	220 lb (100 kg)	Nov 21, 2021
Brett Norfleet; TE	Recruit ratings: Rivals: 247Sports: On3: ESPN: (82)				
Joshua Manning; WR	Lee's Summit, Missouri	Lee's Summit High School	6 ft 3 in (1.91 m)	190 lb (86 kg)	May 8, 2022
Joshua Manning; WR	Recruit ratings: Rivals: 247Sports: On3: ESPN: (79)				
Gabarri Johnson; QB	Tacoma, Washington	Lincoln High School	6 ft 0 in (1.83 m)	201 lb (91 kg)	May 8, 2022
Gabarri Johnson; QB	Recruit ratings: Rivals: 247Sports: On3: ESPN: (81)				
Marvin Burks Jr. S	St. Louis, Missouri	Cardinal Ritter College Prep High School	6 ft 2 in (1.88 m)	181 lb (82 kg)	Dec 4, 2022
Marvin Burks Jr. S	Recruit ratings: Rivals: 247Sports: On3: ESPN: (79)				
Triston Newson; LB	Coldwater, Mississippi	Independence High School	N/A	N/A	Nov 25, 2022
Triston Newson; LB	Recruit ratings: Rivals: 247Sports: On3: ESPN: (76)				
Marquis Johnson; WR	Dickinson, Texas	Dickinson High School	5 ft 11 in (1.80 m)	178 lb (81 kg)	Jun 13, 2022
Marquis Johnson; WR	Recruit ratings: Rivals: 247Sports: On3: ESPN: (78)				
Jordon Harris; ATH	Pine Bluff, Arkansas	Pine Bluff High School	6 ft 5 in (1.96 m)	230 lb (100 kg)	Dec 18, 2022
Jordon Harris; ATH	Recruit ratings: Rivals: 247Sports: On3: ESPN: (77)				
Logan Reichert; T	Kansas City, MO	Raytown Senior High School	6 ft 6 in (1.98 m)	367 lb (166 kg)	Sep 8, 2022
Logan Reichert; T	Recruit ratings: Rivals: 247Sports: On3: ESPN: (79)				
Jahkai Lang; DE	Troy, Missouri	Troy Buchanan High School	6 ft 3 in (1.91 m)	234 lb (106 kg)	Dec 17, 2022
Jahkai Lang; DE	Recruit ratings: Rivals: 247Sports: On3: ESPN: (79)				
Jamal Roberts; RB	St. Louis, Missouri	St. Mary's High School	6 ft 1 in (1.85 m)	200 lb (91 kg)	Jul 3, 2022
Jamal Roberts; RB	Recruit ratings: Rivals: 247Sports: On3: ESPN: (80)				
Daniel Blood; WR	Destrehan, Louisiana	Destrehan High School	6 ft 0 in (1.83 m)	180 lb (82 kg)	Nov 24, 2022
Daniel Blood; WR	Recruit ratings: Rivals: 247Sports: On3: ESPN: (76)				
Shamar McNeil; CB	Fort Lauderdale, Florida	American Heritage School	6 ft 3 in (1.91 m)	175 lb (79 kg)	Jul 30, 2022
Shamar McNeil; CB	Recruit ratings: Rivals: 247Sports: On3: ESPN: (76)				
Nicholas Deloach; WR	East St. Louis, Illinois	Cahokia High School	6 ft 1 in (1.85 m)	170 lb (77 kg)	Jun 26, 2022
Nicholas Deloach; WR	Recruit ratings: Rivals: 247Sports: On3: ESPN: (76)				
Brandon Solis; T	Nashville, Tennessee	Lipscomb Academy	6 ft 6 in (1.98 m)	255 lb (116 kg)	Dec 19, 2022
Brandon Solis; T	Recruit ratings: Rivals: 247Sports: On3: ESPN: (76)				
Serigne Tounkara; DL	League City, Texas	Clear Falls High School	6 ft 2 in (1.88 m)	245 lb (111 kg)	Oct 27, 2022
Serigne Tounkara; DL	Recruit ratings: Rivals: 247Sports: On3: ESPN: (74)				
Philip Roche; S	Merrillville, Indiana	Merrillville High School	6 ft 1 in (1.85 m)	190 lb (86 kg)	Oct 11, 2022
Philip Roche; S	Recruit ratings: Rivals: 247Sports: On3: ESPN: (77)				
Brayshawn Littlejohn; LB	Gaffney, South Carolina	Gaffney High School	6 ft 2 in (1.88 m)	220 lb (100 kg)	Aug 13, 2022
Brayshawn Littlejohn; LB	Recruit ratings: Rivals: 247Sports: On3: ESPN: (74)				
Sam Williams; DL	Hogansville, Georgia	Callaway High School	6 ft 4 in (1.93 m)	280 lb (130 kg)	Dec 21, 2022
Sam Williams; DL	Recruit ratings: Rivals: 247Sports: On3: ESPN: (75)				
Blake Craig; K	Liberty, Missouri	Liberty North High School	5 ft 11 in (1.80 m)	180 lb (82 kg)	Jun 5, 2022
Blake Craig; K	Recruit ratings: Rivals: On3: ESPN: (76)				
Overall recruit ranking: On3: 36
Note: In many cases, Scout, Rivals, 247Sports, On3, and ESPN may conflict in their listings of height and weight.; In these cases, the average was taken. ESPN grades are on a 100-point scale.; Sources: "Rivals commits". Rivals.; "2023 Team Ranking". Rivals.com.; "247Sports commits". 247Sports.

== Schedule ==
Date	Time	Opponent	Rank	Site	TV	Result	Attendance
August 31	7:00 p.m.	South Dakota*		Faurot Field; Columbia, MO (SEC Nation)	SECN	W 35–10	50,434
September 9	6:00 p.m.	Middle Tennessee*		Faurot Field; Columbia, MO	SECN+/ESPN+	W 23–19	57,645
September 16	11:00 a.m.	No. 15 Kansas State*		Faurot Field; Columbia, MO	SECN	W 30–27	62,621
September 23	6:30 p.m.	vs. Memphis*		The Dome at America's Center; St. Louis, MO	ESPNU	W 34–27	45,085
September 30	3:00 p.m.	at Vanderbilt	No. 23	FirstBank Stadium; Nashville, TN	SECN	W 38–21	26,332
October 7	11:00 a.m.	No. 23 LSU	No. 21	Faurot Field; Columbia, MO	ESPN	L 39–49	62,621
October 14	6:30 p.m.	at No. 24 Kentucky		Kroger Field; Lexington, KY	SECN	W 38–21	61,654
October 21	2:30 p.m.	South Carolina^{†}	No. 20	Faurot Field; Columbia, MO (Mayor's Cup)	SECN	W 34–12	62,621
November 4	2:30 p.m.	at No. 2 Georgia	No. 12	Sanford Stadium; Athens, GA	CBS	L 21–30	92,746
November 11	2:30 p.m.	No. 13 Tennessee	No. 14	Faurot Field; Columbia, MO	CBS	W 36–7	62,621
November 18	6:30 p.m.	Florida	No. 9	Faurot Field; Columbia, MO	ESPN	W 33–31	62,621
November 24	3:00 p.m.	at Arkansas	No. 9	Donald W. Reynolds Razorback Stadium; Fayetteville, AR (Battle Line Rivalry)	CBS	W 48–14	59,847
December 29	7:00 p.m.	vs. No. 7 Ohio State*	No. 9	AT&T Stadium; Arlington, TX (Cotton Bowl Classic)	ESPN	W 14–3	70,114
*Non-conference game; ^{†}Homecoming; Rankings from AP Poll (and CFP Rankings, after October 31) – Released prior to game; All times are in Central time; Source:

== Rankings ==
Ranking movements Legend: ██ Increase in ranking ██ Decrease in ranking — = Not ranked RV = Received votes
	Week															
Poll	Pre	1	2	3	4	5	6	7	8	9	10	11	12	13	14	Final
AP	—	—	—	RV	23	21	RV	20	16	14	16	11	10	9	9	8
Coaches	RV	RV	RV	RV	22	22	25	20	16	14	15	11	10	9	9	8
CFP	Not released									12	14	9	9	9	9	Not released

== Game summaries ==
=== vs South Dakota (FCS) ===
Uniform Combination
Helmet (Oval Tiger)	Jersey	Pants

Game One – South Dakota Coyotes (FCS) (0–0) at Missouri Tigers (0–0) – Game summary

Quarter	1	2	3	4	Total
South Dakota (FCS)	0	3	0	7	10
Missouri	14	14	0	7	35

at Faurot Field • Columbia, Missouri

- Date: Thursday, August 31, 2023
- Game time: 7:00 p.m. CDT
- Game weather: Sunny • Temperature: 75 °F (24 °C)
- Game attendance: 50,434
- TV announcers (SECN): Clay Matvick (play-by-play), Aaron Murray (color analyst), and Ashley ShahAhmadi (sideline reporter)

Game information

First quarter

- (7:47) MIZZ – Mekhi Miller 18-yard pass from Brady Cook (Harrison Mevis kick) (Drive: 6 plays, 52 yards, 2:29; Missouri 7–0)
- (3:19) MIZZ – Nathaniel Peat 1-yard run (Harrison Mevis kick) (Drive: 7 plays, 38 yards, 2:53; Missouri 14–0)

Second quarter

- (7:06) USD – Will Leyland 40-yard field goal (Drive: 12 plays, 47 yards, 6:45; Missouri 14–3)
- (1:48) MIZZ – Cody Schrader 2-yard run (Harrison Mevis kick) (Drive: 14 plays, 81 yards, 5:11; Missouri 21–3)
- (0:33) MIZZ – Brady Cook 15-yard run (Harrison Mevis kick) (Drive: 6 plays, 83 yards, 0:52; Missouri 28–3)

Third quarter

No scoring plays

Fourth quarter

- (12:14) USD – Mike Mansaray 6-yard pass from Aidan Bouman (Jack Martens kick) (Drive: 3 plays, 29 yards, 1:08; Missouri 28–10)
- (1:42) MIZZ – Luther Burden III 15-yard pass from Sam Horn (Harrison Mevis kick) (Drive: 9 plays, 78 yards, 4:47; Missouri 35–10)

Statistics	USD	MIZZ
First downs	14	22
Total yards	60–194	66–437
Rushes/yards	35–38	40–211
Passing yards	156	266
Passing: Comp–Att–Int	15–25–0	20–26–1
Time of possession	30:58	29:02

Team	Category	Player	Statistics
South Dakota	Passing	Aiden Bouman	15–25, 156 yards, 1 TD
South Dakota	Rushing	Travis Theis	7 carries, 26 yards
South Dakota	Receiving	Jack Martens	8 receptions, 88 yards
Missouri	Passing	Brady Cook	17–21, 172 yards, 1 TD
Missouri	Rushing	Cody Schrader	18 carries, 138 yards, 1 TD
Missouri	Receiving	Luther Burden III	7 receptions, 96 yards, 1 TD

=== vs Middle Tennessee ===
Uniform Combination
Helmet (Oval Tiger)	Jersey	Pants

Game Two – Middle Tennessee Blue Raiders (0–1) at Missouri Tigers (1–0) – Game summary

Quarter	1	2	3	4	Total
Middle Tennessee	0	7	3	9	19
Missouri	3	7	6	7	23

at Faurot Field • Columbia, Missouri

- Date: Saturday, September 9, 2023
- Game time: 6:00 p.m. CDT
- Game weather: Sunny • Temperature: 74 °F (23 °C)
- Game attendance: 57,645
- TV announcers (ESPN+): Mark Neely (play-by-play) and Barrett Brooks (analyst)

Game information

First quarter

- (5:21) MIZZ – Harrison Mevis 38-yard field goal (Drive: 8 plays, 34 yards, 3:58; Missouri 3–0)

Second quarter

- (8:14) MTSU – Kalani Norris 3-yard pass from Nicholas Vattiato (Zeke Rankin kick) (Drive: 14 plays, 86 yards, 7:17; Middle Tennessee 7–3)
- (0:24) MIZZ – Brady Cook 1-yard run (Harrison Mevis kick) (Drive: 16 plays, 71 yards, 7:45; Missouri 10–7)

Third quarter

- (8:39) MTSU – Zeke Rankin 25-yard field goal (Drive: 14 plays, 68 yards, 6:21; Tied 10–10)
- (4:58) MIZZ – Theo Wease Jr. 5-yard pass from Brady Cook (Harrison Mevis kick failed) (Drive: 8 plays, 80 yards, 3:35; Missouri 16–10)

Fourth quarter

- (14:53) MIZZ – Nathaniel Peat 49-yard pass from Brady Cook (Harrison Mevis kick) (Drive: 7 plays, 82 yards, 2:39; Missouri 23–10)
- (6:57) MTSU – Justin Olson 13-yard pass from Nicholas Vattiato (Zeke Rankin kick) (Drive: 11 plays, 84 yards, 3:30; Missouri 23–17)
- (6:07) MTSU – Team Safety (Missouri 23–19)

Statistics	MTSU	MIZZ
First downs	16	21
Total yards	65–285	65–316
Rushes/yards	29–71	46–112
Passing yards	214	204
Passing: Comp–Att–Int	22–36–0	14–19–0
Time of possession	28:00	32:00

Team	Category	Player	Statistics
Middle Tennessee	Passing	Nicholas Vattiato	22–36, 214 yards, 2 TD
Middle Tennessee	Rushing	Frank Peasant	13 carries, 35 yards
Middle Tennessee	Receiving	Elijah Metcalf	5 receptions, 70 yards
Missouri	Passing	Brady Cook	14–19, 204 yards, 2 TD
Missouri	Rushing	Cody Schrader	23 carries, 84 yards
Missouri	Receiving	Luther Burden III	8 receptions, 117 yards

=== vs No. 15 Kansas State ===
Uniform Combination
Helmet (Oval Tiger)	Jersey	Pants

Game Three – No. 15 Kansas State Wildcats (2–0) at Missouri Tigers (2–0) – Game summary

Quarter	1	2	3	4	Total
No. 15 Kansas State	7	7	10	3	27
Missouri	10	7	0	13	30

at Faurot Field • Columbia, Missouri

- Date: Saturday, September 16, 2023
- Game time: 11:00 a.m. CDT
- Game weather: • Temperature:
- Game attendance: 62,621
- TV announcers (SECN): Taylor Zarzour (play-by-play), Matt Stinchcomb (analyst), and Alyssa Lang (sideline)

Game information

First quarter

- (10:46) KSU – Phillip Brooks 10-yard pass from Will Howard (Chris Tennant kick) (Drive: 11 plays, 75 yards, 4:14; Kansas State 7–0)
- (7:57) MIZZ – Luther Burden III 47-yard pass from Brady Cook (Harrison Mevis kick) (Drive: 6 plays, 75 yards, 2:49; Tied 7–7)
- (3:58) MIZZ – Harrison Mevis 30-yard field goal (Drive: 7 plays, 35 yards, 3:04; Missouri 10–7)

Second quarter

- (10:05) KSU – Ben Sinnott 3-yard pass from Will Howard (Chris Tennant kick) (Drive: 10 plays, 64 yards, 4:46; Kansas State 14–10)
- (7:36) MIZZ – Brady Cook 1-yard run (Harrison Mevis kick) (Drive: 6 plays, 75 yards, 2:29; Missouri 17–14)

Third quarter

- (10:07) KSU – Chris Tennant 46-yard field goal (Drive: 6 plays, 16 yards, 2:37; Tied 17–17)
- (1:39) KSU – Ben Sinnott 3-yard pass from Will Howard (Chris Tennant kick) (Drive: 12 plays, 74 yards, 5:52; Kansas State 24–17)

Fourth quarter

- (14:14) MIZZ – Harrison Mevis 25-yard field goal (Drive: 6 plays, 68 yards, 1:51; Kansas State 24–20)
- (8:24) MIZZ – Luther Burden III 26-yard pass from Brady Cook (Harrison Mevis kick) (Drive: 2 plays, 77 yards, 0:29; Missouri 27–24)
- (5:25) KSU – Chris Tennant 26-yard field goal (Drive: 8 plays, 67 yards, 2:59; Tied 27–27)
- (0:00) MIZZ – Harrison Mevis 61-yard field goal (Drive: 10 plays, 38 yards, 1:25; Missouri 30–27)

Statistics	KSU	MIZZ
First downs	19	20
Total yards	74–408	64–430
Rushes/yards	35–138	28–74
Passing yards	270	356
Passing: Comp–Att–Int	25–39–1	23–36–0
Time of possession	34:00	26:00

Team	Category	Player	Statistics
Kansas State	Passing	Will Howard	25–39, 270 yards, 3 TD, 1 INT
Kansas State	Rushing	Treshaun Ward	10 carries, 54 yards
Kansas State	Receiving	Ben Sinnott	5 receptions, 78 yards, 2 TD
Missouri	Passing	Brady Cook	23–35, 356 yards, 2 TD
Missouri	Rushing	Cody Schrader	10 carries, 58 yards
Missouri	Receiving	Luther Burden III	7 receptions, 114 yards, 2 TD

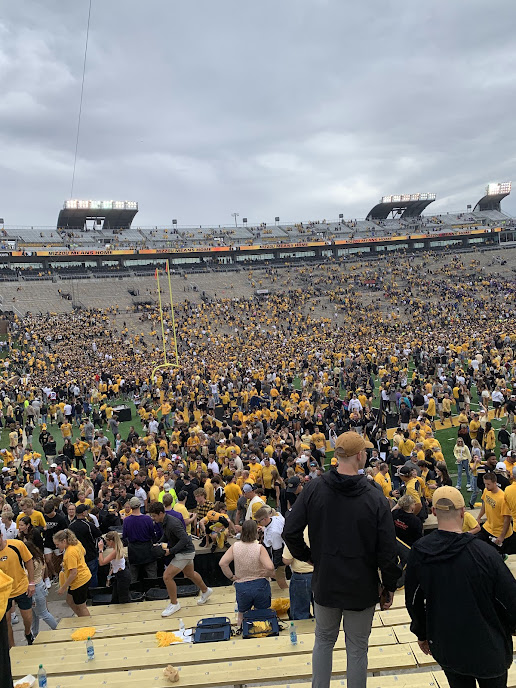
Fans on Fauort Field after the Tigers beat Kansas State

=== vs Memphis ===
Uniform Combination
Helmet (Oval Tiger)	Jersey	Pants

Game Four – Memphis Tigers (3–0) at Missouri Tigers (3–0) – Game summary

Quarter	1	2	3	4	Total
Memphis	10	0	7	10	27
Missouri	7	10	7	10	34

at The Dome at America's Center • St. Louis, Missouri

- Date: Saturday, September 23, 2023
- Game time: 6:30 p.m. CDT
- Game weather: none (indoor stadium)
- Game attendance: 45,085
- Referee: Ken Williams
- TV announcers (ESPNU): Courtney Lyle (play-by-play), Hutson Mason (analyst)

Game information

First quarter

- (9:37) MIZZ – Marquis Johnson 76-yard pass from Brady Cook (Harrison Mevis kick) (Drive: 3 plays, 91 yards, 1:13; Missouri 7–0)
- (4:18) MEM – Tanner Gillis 43-yard field goal (Drive: 12 plays, 50 yards, 5:19; Missouri 7–3)
- (2:15) MEM – Joseph Scales 3-yard pass from Seth Henigan (Tanner Gillis kick) (Drive: 4 plays, 10 yards, 1:06; Memphis 10–7)

Second quarter

- (6:27) MIZZ – Nathaniel Peat 1-yard run (Harrison Mevis kick) (Drive: 9 plays, 75 yards, 5:14; Missouri 14–10)
- (0:05) MIZZ – Harrison Mevis 25-yard field goal (Drive: 10 plays, 78 yards, 3:27; Missouri 17–10)

Third quarter

- (9:19) MIZZ – Theo Wease Jr. 19-yard pass from Brady Cook (Harrison Mevis kick) (Drive: 3 plays, 76 yards, 1:17; Missouri 24–10)
- (4:07) MEM – Blake Watson 13-yard pass from Seth Henigan (Tanner Gillis kick) (Drive: 6 plays, 69 yards, 2:47; Missouri 24–17)

Fourth quarter

- (11:01) MIZZ – Harrison Mevis 32-yard field goal (Drive: 9 plays, 74 yards, 3:53; Missouri 27–17)
- (5:18) MEM – Tanner Gillis 22-yard field goal (Drive: 12 plays, 72 yards, 5:43; Missouri 27–20)
- (2:46) MIZZ – Cody Schrader 37-yard run (Harrison Mevis kick) (Drive: 5 plays, 75 yards, 2:32; Missouri 34–20)
- (1:21) MEM – Koby Drake 21-yard pass from Seth Henigan (Tanner Gillis kick) (Drive: 8 plays, 75 yards, 1:25; Missouri 34–27)

Statistics	MEM	MIZZ
First downs	21	22
Total yards	76–399	61–542
Rushes/yards	29–83	36–201
Passing yards	316	341
Passing: Comp–Att–Int	31–47–2	18–25–0
Time of possession	32:40	27:20

Team	Category	Player	Statistics
Memphis	Passing	Seth Henigan	31/47, 316 yards, 3 TD, 2 INT
Memphis	Rushing	Blake Watson	10 carries, 47 yards
Memphis	Receiving	Roc Taylor	7 receptions, 143 yards
Missouri	Passing	Brady Cook	18/25, 341 yards, 2 TD
Missouri	Rushing	Cody Schrader	14 carries, 123 yards, TD
Missouri	Receiving	Luther Burden III	10 receptions, 177 yards

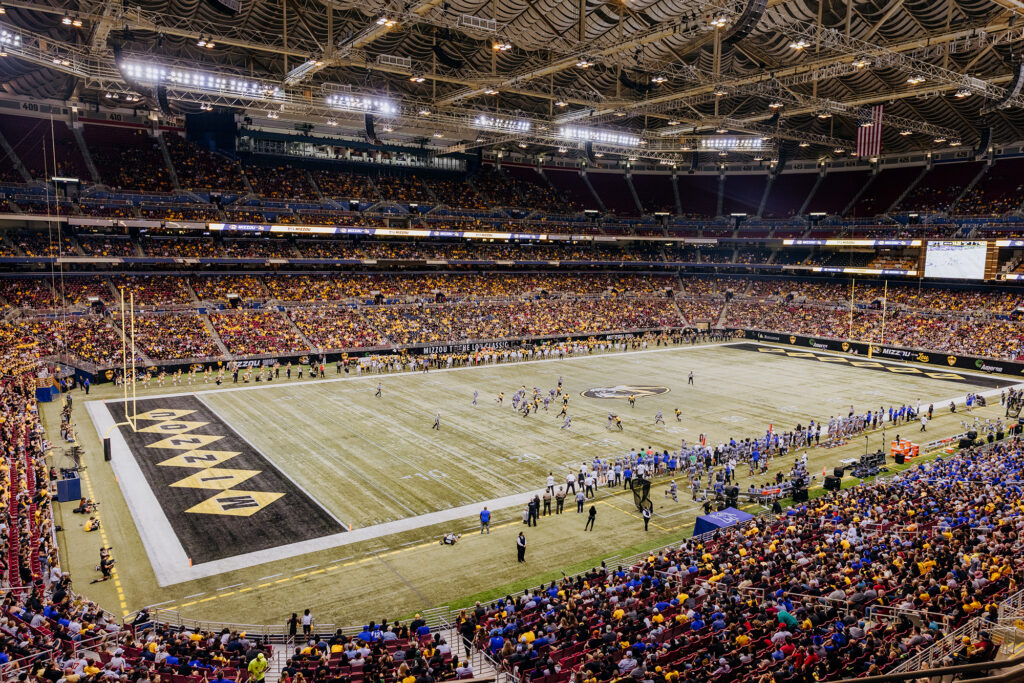
The Tigers take on the Tigers at The Dome at America's Center

=== at Vanderbilt ===
Uniform Combination
Helmet (Oval Tiger)	Jersey	Pants

Game Five – No. 23 Missouri Tigers (4–0) at Vanderbilt Commodores (2–3) – Game summary

Quarter	1	2	3	4	Total
No. 23 Missouri	3	14	7	14	38
Vanderbilt	7	0	0	14	21

at FirstBank Stadium • Nashville, Tennessee

- Date: Saturday, September 30, 2023
- Game time: 3:00 p.m. CST
- Game weather: –
- Game attendance: 26,332
- Referee: Steve Marlowe
- TV announcers (SECN): Dave Neal (play-by-play), Deuce McAllister (analyst), Andraya Carter (sideline)

Game information

First quarter

- (6:57) MIZZ – Harrison Mevis 23-yard field goal (Drive: 14 plays, 69 yards, 5:43; Missouri 3–0)
- (3:46) VAN – Ken Seals 6-yard run (Jacob Borcila kick) (Drive: 8 plays, 76 yards, 3:11; Vanderbilt 7–3)

Second quarter

- (12:27) MIZZ – Cody Schrader 1-yard run (Harrison Mevis kick) (Drive: 12 plays, 85 yards, 6:19; Missouri 10–7)
- (0:55) MIZZ – Theo Wease Jr. 12-yard pass from Brady Cook (Harrison Mevis kick) (Drive: 7 plays, 59 yards, 2:27; Missouri 17–7)

Third quarter

- (10:37) MIZZ – Luther Burden III 18-yard pass from Brady Cook (Harrison Mevis kick) (Drive: 8 plays, 75 yards, 4:23; Missouri 24–7)

Fourth quarter

- (12:59) VAN – Will Sheppard 31-yard pass from Ken Seals (Jacob Borcila kick) (Drive: 2 plays, 60 yards, 0:33; Missouri 24–14)
- (11:10) MIZZ – Marquis Johnson 44-yard pass from Brady Cook (Harrison Mevis kick) (Drive: 4 plays, 65 yards, 1:49; Missouri 31–14)
- (9:36) VAN – Junior Sherrill 45-yard pass from Ken Seals (Jacob Borcila kick) (Drive: 3 plays, 75 yards, 1:34; Missouri 31–21)
- (4:23) MIZZ – Luther Burden III 17-yard pass from Brady Cook (Harrison Mevis kick) (Drive: 3 plays, 19 yards, 1:19; Missouri 38–21)

Statistics	MIZZ	VAN
First downs	28	15
Total yards	75–532	72–300
Rushing yards	34–137	20–41
Passing yards	395	259
Passing: Comp–Att–Int	33–41–0	20–31–1
Time of possession	35:58	24:02

Team	Category	Player	Statistics
Missouri	Passing	Brady Cook	33/41, 395 yards, 4 TD
Missouri	Rushing	Nathaniel Peat	12 carries, 71 yards
Missouri	Receiving	Luther Burden III	11 receptions, 140 yards, 2 TD
Vanderbilt	Passing	Ken Seals	20/31, 259 yards, 2 TD, INT
Vanderbilt	Rushing	Jayden McGowan	3 carries, 24 yards
Vanderbilt	Receiving	Will Sheppard	5 receptions, 98 yards, TD

=== vs No. 23 LSU ===
Uniform Combination
Helmet (Oval Tiger)	Jersey	Pants

Game Six – No. 23 LSU Tigers (3–2) at No. 21 Missouri Tigers (5–0) – Game summary

Quarter	1	2	3	4	Total
No. 23 LSU	7	10	10	22	49
No. 21 Missouri	15	10	7	7	39

at Faurot Field • Columbia, Missouri

- Date: Saturday, October 7, 2023
- Game time: 11:00 a.m. CST
- Game weather: –
- Game attendance: 62,621
- TV announcers (ESPN): Bob Wischusen (play-by-play), Robert Griffin III (analyst), Kris Budden (sideline)

Game information

First quarter

- (9:50) MIZZ – Theo Wease Jr. 18-yard pass from Brady Cook (Brady Cook run) (Drive: 9 plays, 87 yards, 3:45; Missouri 8–0)
- (3:33) LSU – Logan Diggs 1-yard run (Damian Ramos kick) (Drive: 11 plays, 74 yards, 6:17; Missouri 8–7)
- (1:03) MIZZ – Cody Schrader 21-yard run (Harrison Mevis kick) (Drive: 6 plays, 75 yards, 2:30; Missouri 15–7)

Second quarter

- (10:47) MIZZ – Brett Norfleet 9-yard pass from Brady Cook (Harrison Mevis kick) (Drive: 6 plays, 57 yards, 3:32; Missouri 22–7)
- (5:43) LSU – Damian Ramos 48-yard field goal (Drive: 11 plays, 44 yards, 5:04; Missouri 22–10)
- (1:59) LSU – Mason Taylor 3-yard pass from Jayden Daniels (Damian Ramos kick) (Drive: 6 plays, 45 yards, 3:09; Missouri 22–17)
- (0:01) MIZZ – Harrison Mevis 50-yard field goal (Drive: 9 plays, 42 yards, 1:59; Missouri 25–17)

Third quarter

- (8:12) LSU – Damian Ramos 29-yard field goal (Drive: 8 plays, 61 yards, 3:15; Missouri 25–20)
- (6:00) LSU – Brian Thomas Jr. 42-yard pass from Jayden Daniels (Damian Ramos kick) (Drive: 2 plays, 45 yards, 0:46; LSU 27–25)
- (2:22) MIZZ – Cody Schrader 2-yard run (Harrison Mevis kick) (Drive: 6 plays, 75 yards, 3:38; Missouri 32–27)

Fourth quarter

- (7:54) LSU – Jayden Daniels 35-yard run (Jayden Daniels–Malik Nabers pass) (Drive: 7 plays, 92 yards, 3:29; LSU 35–32)
- (5:40) MIZZ – Cody Schrader 1-yard run (Harrison Mevis kick) (Drive: 5 plays, 70 yards, 2:14; Missouri 39–35)
- (2:58) LSU – Malik Nabers 29-yard pass from Jayden Daniels (Damian Ramos kick) (Drive: 5 plays, 75 yards, 2:42; LSU 42–39)
- (0:34) LSU – Major Burns 17-yard interception return (Damian Ramos kick) (LSU 49–39)

Statistics	LSU	MIZZ
First downs	25	23
Total yards	66–533	68–527
Rushing yards	43–274	21–116
Passing yards	259	411
Passing: Comp–Att–Int	15–23–0	30–47–2
Time of possession	32:26	27:34

Team	Category	Player	Statistics
LSU	Passing	Jayden Daniels	15/21, 259 yards, 3 TD
LSU	Rushing	Jayden Daniels	24 carries, 134 yards, TD
LSU	Receiving	Malik Nabers	6 receptions, 146 yards, TD
Missouri	Passing	Brady Cook	30/47, 411 yards, 2 TD, 2 INT
Missouri	Rushing	Cody Schrader	13 carries, 114 yards, 3 TD
Missouri	Receiving	Luther Burden III	11 receptions, 149 yards

=== at No. 24 Kentucky ===
Uniform Combination
Helmet (Oval Tiger)	Jersey	Pants

Game Seven – Missouri Tigers (5–1) at No. 24 Kentucky Wildcats (5–1) – Game summary

Quarter	1	2	3	4	Total
Missouri	0	17	3	18	38
No. 24 Kentucky	14	0	7	0	21

at Kroger Field • Lexington, Kentucky

- Date: Saturday, October 14, 2023
- Game time: 6:30 p.m. CST
- Game weather: –
- Game attendance: 61,654
- Referee: Daniel Gautreaux
- TV announcers (SECN): Tom Hart (play-by-play), Jordan Rodgers (analyst), Cole Cubelic (sideline)

Game information

First quarter

- (8:32) UK – Ray Davis 7-yard pass from Devin Leary (Alex Raynor kick) (Drive: 9 plays, 65 yards, 4:46; Kentucky 7-0)
- (2:09) UK – Devin Leary 13-yard run (Alex Raynor kick) (Drive: 9 plays, 63 yards, 4:58; Kentucky 14-0)

Second quarter

- (11:38) MIZ – Marquis Johnson 39-yard pass from Luke Bauer (Harrison Mevis kick) (Drive: 6 plays, 64 yards, 3:12; Kentucky 14-7)
- (4:44) MIZ – Harrison Mevis 25-yard field goal (Drive: 13 plays, 56 yards, 4:55; Kentucky 14-10)
- (0:15) MIZ – Theo Wease Jr. 18-yard pass from Brady Cook (Harrison Mevis kick) (Drive: 8 plays, 61 yards, 1:25; Missouri 17-14)

Third quarter

- (11:54) MIZ – Harrison Mevis 31-yard field goal (Drive: 6 plays, 17 yards, 2:53; Missouri 20-14)
- (3:39) UK – Anthony Brown-Stephens 4-yard pass from Devin Leary (Alex Raynor kick) (Drive: 7 plays, 71 yards, 3:31; Kentucky 21-20)

Fourth quarter

- (14:14) MIZ – Brady Cook 1-yard run (Cody Schrader run) (Drive: 9 plays, 70 yards, 4:16; Missouri 28-21)
- (11:07) MIZ – Cody Schrader 19-yard run (Harrison Mevis kick) (Drive: 3 plays, 34 yards, 0:57; Missouri 35-21)
- (3:17) MIZ – Harrison Mevis 29-yard field goal (Drive: 4 plays, 4 yards, 0:58; Missouri 38-21)

Statistics	MIZZ	UK
First downs	19	19
Total yards	68–324	58–299
Rushing yards	38–118	31–179
Passing yards	206	120
Passing: Comp–Att–Int	20–30–1	14–27–2
Time of possession	31:07	28:53

Team	Category	Player	Statistics
Missouri	Passing	Brady Cook	19–29, 175 yards, 1 TD, 1 INT
Missouri	Rushing	Cody Schrader	20 carries, 71 yards, 1 TD
Missouri	Receiving	Theo Wease Jr.	6 receptions, 66 yards, 1 TD
Kentucky	Passing	Devin Leary	14–27, 120 yards, 2 TD, 2 INT
Kentucky	Rushing	Ray Davis	20 carries, 128 yards
Kentucky	Receiving	Justice Dingle	2 receptions, 32 yards

=== vs South Carolina (rivalry) ===
Uniform Combination
Helmet (Block M)	Jersey	Pants

Game Eight – South Carolina Gamecocks (2–4) at No. 20 Missouri Tigers (6–1) – Game summary

Quarter	1	2	3	4	Total
South Carolina	0	3	6	3	12
No. 20 Missouri	14	10	0	10	34

at Faurot Field • Columbia, Missouri

- Date: Saturday, October 21, 2023
- Game time: 2:30 p.m. CDT
- Game weather: – Sunny, 78 degrees, 10 mph NW winds
- Game attendance: 62,621
- TV announcers (SECN): Taylor Zarzour (play-by-play), Matt Stinchcomb (analyst), Alyssa Lang (sideline)

Game information

First quarter

- (6:31) MIZZ: Luther Burden III 42-yard pass from Brady Cook (Harrison Mevis kick) (Drive: 5 plays, 67 yards, 2:30; Missouri 7-0)
- (0:46) MIZZ: Cody Schrader 10-yard run (Harrison Mevis kick) (Drive: 7 plays, 59 yards, 3:26; Missouri 14-0)

Second quarter

- (8:21) MIZZ: Brady Cook 17-yard run (Harrison Mevis kick) (Drive: 10 plays, 87 yards, 4:02; Missouri 21-0)
- (1:50) MIZZ: Harrison Mevis 21-yard field goal (Drive: 9 plays, 82 yards, 3:48; Missouri 24-0)
- (0:31) SCAR: Mitch Jeter 51-yard field goal (Drive: 10 plays, 42 yards, 1:19; Missouri 24-3)

Third quarter

- (10:37) SCAR: Mitch Jeter 41-yard field goal (Drive: 10 plays, 54 yards, 4:16; Missouri 24-6)
- (7:07) SCAR: Mitch Jeter 38-yard field goal (Drive: 5 plays, 14 yards, 1:44; Missouri 24-9)

Fourth quarter

- (13:42) MIZZ: Harrison Mevis 53-yard field goal (Drive: 10 plays, 26 yards, 4:35; Missouri 27-9)
- (10:31) SCAR: Mitch Jeter 21-yard field goal (Drive: 9 plays, 72 yards, 3:11; Missouri 27-12)
- (2:46) MIZZ: Cody Schrader 11-yard run (Harrison Mevis kick) (Drive: 9 plays, 67 yards, 3:34; Missouri 34-12)

Statistics	SC	MIZZ
First downs	20	22
Total plays-yards	69–286	65–418
Rushing attempts-yards	29–69	40–213
Passing attempts-yards	40–217	25–205
Passing: Comp–Att–Int	23–40–1	15–25–0
Time of possession	31:08	28:52

Team	Category	Player	Statistics
South Carolina	Passing	Spencer Rattler	23–40, 217 yards, 1 INT
South Carolina	Rushing	Mario Anderson	12 carries, 68 yards
South Carolina	Receiving	Nyck Harbor	2 receptions, 50 yards
Missouri	Passing	Brady Cook	15–25, 205 yards, 1 TD
Missouri	Rushing	Cody Schrader	26 carries, 159 yards, 2 TD
Missouri	Receiving	Luther Burden III	5 receptions, 97 yards, 1 TD

=== at No. 2 Georgia ===
Uniform Combination
Helmet (Oval Tiger)	Jersey	Pants

Game Nine – No. 12 Missouri Tigers (7–1) at No. 2 Georgia Bulldogs (8–0) – Game summary

Quarter	1	2	3	4	Total
No. 12 Missouri	7	3	3	8	21
No. 2 Georgia	3	7	14	6	30

at Sanford Stadium • Athens, Georgia

- Date: Saturday, November 4, 2023
- Game time: 3:30 pm EDT
- Game weather: 75 degrees, sunny, light and variable winds
- Game attendance: 92,746
- TV announcers (CBS): Rich Waltz (play-by-play), Aaron Taylor (analyst), and Amanda Guerra (sideline)

Game information

First quarter

- (10:17) UGA - Peyton Woodring 33-yard field goal (Drive: 12 plays, 65 yards, 4:40: Georgia 3-0)
- (5:35) MIZZ - Luther Burden III 39-yard pass from Brady Cook (Harrison Mevis kick) (Drive: 9 plays, 75 yards, 4:42: Missouri 7-3)

Second quarter

- (13:38) UGA - Dominic Lovett 6-yard pass from Carson Beck (Peyton Woodring kick) (Drive: 12 plays, 70 yards, 7:07: Georgia 10-7)
- (4:14) MIZZ - Harrison Mevis 37-yeard field goal (Drive: 11 plays, 61 yards, 5:35: Tied 10-10)

Third quarter

- (11:42) MIZZ - Harrison Mevis 42-yard field goal (Drive: 8 plays, 59 yards, 3:12: Missouri 13-10)
- (8:10) UGA - Kendall Milton 15-yard run (Peyton Woodring kick) (Drive: 6 plays, 65 yards, 3:26: Georgia 17-13)
- (0:38) UGA - Oscar Delp 5-yard pass from Carson Beck (Peyton Woodring kick) (Drive: 10 plays, 67 yards, 5:23: Georgia 24-13)

Fourth quarter

- (12:50) MIZZ - Cody Scrader 12-yard run (Brady Cook pass to Luther Burden III for 2-pt conversion)(Drive: 9 plays, 75 yards, 2:48: Georgia 24-21)
- (8:59) UGA - Peyton Woodring 30-yard field goal (Drive: 8 plays, 53 yards, 3:44: Georgia 27-21)
- (3:57) UGA - Peyton Woodring 48-yard field goal (Drive: 7 plays, 40 yards, 3:49: Georgia 30-21)

Statistics	MIZZ	UGA
First downs	21	21
Total yards	363	385
Rushing yards	151	131
Passing yards	212	254
Passing: Comp–Att–Int	14–30–2	21–32–0
Time of possession	25:42	34:18

Team	Category	Player	Statistics
Missouri	Passing	Brady Cook	14–30, 212 yards, 1 TD, 2 INT
Missouri	Rushing	Cody Schrader	22 carries, 112 yards, 1 TD
Missouri	Receiving	Theo Wease	5 receptions, 90 yards
Georgia	Passing	Carson Beck	21–32, 254 yards, 2 TD
Georgia	Rushing	Daijun Edwards	16 carries, 77 yards
Georgia	Receiving	Ladd McConkey	7 receptions, 95 yards

=== vs No. 13 Tennessee ===
Uniform Combination
Helmet (Block M)	Jersey	Pants

Game Ten – No. 13 Tennessee Volunteers (7–2) at No. 14 Missouri Tigers (7–2) – Game summary

Quarter	1	2	3	4	Total
No. 13 Tennessee	0	7	0	0	7
No. 14 Missouri	0	13	9	14	36

at Faurot Field, Columbia, Missouri

- Date: Saturday, November 11, 2023
- Game time: 2:30 p.m. CST
- Game weather: 55 degrees, mostly sunny, 6 mph ESE wind
- Game attendance: 62,621
- Referee: David Smith
- TV announcers (CBS): Brad Nessler (play-by-play), Gary Danielson (analyst), and Jenny Dell (sideline)

Game information

First quarter

No scoring

Second quarter

- (14:16) MIZZ: Harrison Mevis 31-yard field goal (Drive: 20 plays, 72 yards, 10:55; Missouri 3-0)
- (12:15) TENN: Dont'e Thornton Jr. 46-yard pass from Joe Milton III (Charles Campbell kick) (Drive: 6 plays, 75 yards, 1:51; Tennessee 7-3)
- (10:33) MIZZ: Cody Schrader 7-yard run (Harrison Mevis kick) (Drive: 5 plays, 75 yards, 1:52; Missouri 10-7)
- (0:00) MIZZ: Harrison Mevis 46-yard field goal (Drive: 4 plays, 53 yards, 0:20; Missouri 13-7)

Third quarter

- (10:04) MIZZ: Brady Cook 3-yard run (pass failed) (Drive: 7 plays, 80 yards, 3:05; Missouri 19-7)
- (2:38) MIZZ: Harrison Mevis 23-yard field goal (Drive: 9 plays, 59 yards, 5:04; Missouri 22-7)

Fourth quarter

- (6:21) MIZZ: Luther Burden III 21-yard pass from Brady Cook (Harrison Mevis kick) (Drive: 6 plays, 66 yards, 4:36; Missouri 29-7)
- (5:50) MIZZ: Daylan Carnell 38-yard interception return (Harrison Mevis kick) (Missouri 36-7)

Statistics	TENN	MIZZ
First downs	15	26
Total yards	350	530
Rushing yards	83	255
Passing yards	267	275
Passing: Comp–Att–Int	22–34–1	18–24–1
Time of possession	20:04	39:56

Team	Category	Player	Statistics
Tennessee	Passing	Joe Milton III	22–34, 267 yards, 1 TD, 1 INT
Tennessee	Rushing	Joe Milton III	10 carries, 36 yards
Tennessee	Receiving	Ramel Keyton	4 receptions, 57 yards
Missouri	Passing	Brady Cook	18–24, 275 yards, 1 TD, 1 INT
Missouri	Rushing	Cody Schrader	35 carries, 205 yards, 1 TD
Missouri	Receiving	Cody Schrader	5 receptions, 116 yards

=== vs Florida ===
Uniform Combination
Helmet (Block M)	Jersey	Pants

Game Eleven – Florida Gators (5–5) at No. 9 Missouri Tigers (8–2) – Game summary

Quarter	1	2	3	4	Total
Florida	7	0	14	10	31
No. 9 Missouri	3	10	10	10	33

at Faurot Field • Columbia, Missouri

- Date: Saturday, November 18, 2023
- Game time: 6:30 p.m. CST
- Game weather: Clear skies, 50 degrees, light winds
- Game attendance: 62,621
- Referee: Scott Walker
- TV announcers (ESPN): Joe Tessitore (play-by-play), Jesse Palmer (analyst), and Katie George (sideline)
- Notes: Missouri converted on 4th and 17 from their own 33 yard line with 38 seconds left in the game to keep their hopes alive. They would eventually drive to the Florida 13 yard line, where Harrison Mevis would connect on a game-winning 30 yard field goal.

Game information

First quarter

- (10:33) MIZ – Harrison Mevis 22-yard field goal (Drive: 12 plays, 70 yards, 4:27; Missouri 3-0)
- (7:49) FLA – Eugene Wilson III 8-yard pass from Graham Mertz (Drive: 5 plays, 80 yards, 2:39; Florida 7-3)

Second quarter

- (14:29) MIZ – Cody Schrader 42-yard run (Harrison Mevis kick) (Drive: 3 plays, 51 yards, 0:58; Missouri 10-7)
- (1:21) MIZ – Harrison Mevis 38-yard field goal (Drive: 7 plays, 41 yards, 2:42; Missouri 13-7)

Third quarter

- (11:54) FLA – Trevor Etienne 37-yard pass from Graham Mertz (Trey Smack kick) (Drive: 4 plays, 75 yards, 3:06; Florida 14-13)
- (8:53) MIZ – Brady Cook 1-yard run (Harrison Mevis kick) (Drive: 8 plays, 75 yards, 3:01; Missouri 20-14)
- (7:16) FLA – Ricky Pearsall 39-yard run (Trey Smack kick) (Drive: 3 plays, 82 yards, 1:30; Florida 21-20)
- (3:53) MIZ – Harrison Mevis 24-yard field goal (Drive: 7 plays, 68 yards, 3:23; Missouri 23-21)

Fourth quarter

- (13:14) MIZ – Theo Wease Jr. 77-yard pass from Brady Cook (Harrison Mevis kick) (Drive: 2 plays, 81 yards, 0:47; Missouri 30-21)
- (7:49) FLA – Trevor Etienne 9-yard run (Trey Smack kick) (Drive: 10 plays, 75 yards, 5:25; Missouri 30-28)
- (1:36) FLA – Trey Smack 35-yard field goal (Drive: 8 plays, 45 yards, 3:08; Florida 31-30)
- (0:05) MIZ – Harrison Mevis 30-yard field goal (Drive: 12 plays, 62 yards, 1:29; Missouri 33-31)

Statistics	FLA	MIZZ
First downs	23	21
Total yards	500	508
Rushing yards	261	177
Passing yards	239	331
Passing: Comp–Att–Int	18–26–1	20–35–0
Time of possession	33:08	26:52

Team	Category	Player	Statistics
Florida	Passing	Graham Mertz	14–21, 183 yards, 2 TD, 1 INT
Florida	Rushing	Montrell Johnson Jr.	12 carries, 85 yards
Florida	Receiving	Ricky Pearsall	2 receptions, 72 yards
Missouri	Passing	Brady Cook	20–34, 331 yards, 1 TD
Missouri	Rushing	Cody Schrader	23 carries, 148 yards, 1 TD
Missouri	Receiving	Luther Burden III	9 receptions, 158 yards

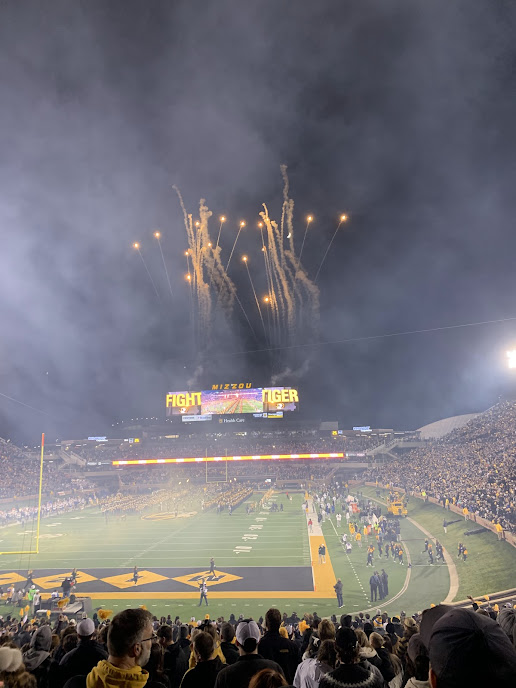
Missouri Tigers take the field vs the Florida Gators

=== at Arkansas (rivalry) ===
Uniform Combination
Helmet (Block M)	Jersey	Pants

Game Twelve – No. 9 Missouri Tigers (9–2) at Arkansas Razorbacks (4–7) (Battle Line Rivalry) – Game summary

Quarter	1	2	3	4	Total
No. 9 Missouri	10	10	21	7	48
Arkansas	0	0	0	14	14

at Donald W. Reynolds Razorback Stadium • Fayetteville, Arkansas

- Date: Friday, November 24, 2023
- Game time: 3:00 p.m. CST
- Game weather: Clear skies, 54 degrees, 7 mph NE wind
- Game attendance: 59,847
- Referee: Daniel Gautreaux
- TV announcers (CBS): Rich Waltz (play-by-play), Aaron Taylor (analyst), and Amanda Guerra (sideline)

Game information

First quarter

- (9:12) MIZ – Cody Schrader 2-yard run (Harrison Mevis kick) (Drive: 7 plays, 54 yards, 3:29; Missouri 7-0)
- (4:45) MIZ – Harrison Mevis 24-yard field goal (Drive: 10 plays, 41 yards, 4:14; Missouri 10-0)

Second quarter

- (5:35) MIZ – Brady Cook 3-yard run (Harrison Mevis kick) (Drive: 6 plays, 71 yards, 2:56; Missouri 17-0)
- (0:49) MIZ – Harrison Mevis 22-yard field goal (Drive: 7 plays, 69 yards, 3:26; Missouri 20-0)

Third quarter

- (11:43) MIZ – Brett Norfleet 16-yard pass from Brady Cook (Harrison Mevis kick) (Drive: 5 plays, 38 yards, 2:26; Missouri 27-0)
- (11:32) MIZ – Brett Norfleet 11-yard pass from Brady Cook (Harrison Mevis kick) (Drive: 1 play, 11 yards, 0:06; Missouri 34-0)
- (5:06) MIZ – Jayden Jernigan 10-yard fumble return (Harrison Mevis kick) (Missouri 41-0)

Fourth quarter

- (11:35) ARK – Andrew Armstrong 8-yard pass from Jacolby Criswell (Cam Little kick) (Drive: 15 plays, 75 yards, 8:31; Missouri 41-7)
- (5:48) ARK – Isaiah Augustave 6-yard run (Cam Little kick) (Drive: 8 plays, 70 yards, 4:18; Missouri 41-14)
- (2:37) MIZ – Nathaniel Peat 1-yard run (Harrison Mevis kick) (Drive: 6 plays, 26 yards, 3:07; Missouri 48-14)

Statistics	MIZZ	ARK
First downs	17	13
Total yards	370	225
Rushing yards	258	127
Passing yards	112	98
Passing: Comp–Att–Int	12–21–0	14–22–0
Time of possession	31:20	28:40

Team	Category	Player	Statistics
Missouri	Passing	Brady Cook	12–20, 112 yards, 2 TD
Missouri	Rushing	Cody Schrader	27 carries, 217 yards, 1 TD
Missouri	Receiving	Luther Burden III	6 receptions, 55 yards
Arkansas	Passing	Jacolby Criswell	12–20, 96 yards, 1 TD
Arkansas	Rushing	Isaiah Augustave	15 carries, 80 yards, 1 TD
Arkansas	Receiving	Andrew Armstrong	4 receptions, 40 yards, 1 TD

=== vs. No. 7 Ohio State (Cotton Bowl Classic) ===
Uniform Combination
Helmet (Block M)	Jersey	Pants

Cotton Bowl Classic – No. 9 Missouri Tigers (10–2) vs No. 7 Ohio State Buckeyes (11–1) – Game summary

Quarter	1	2	3	4	Total
No. 9 Missouri	0	0	0	14	14
No. 7 Ohio State	3	0	0	0	3

at AT&T Stadium • Arlington, Texas

- Date: Friday, December 29, 2023
- Game time: 7:00 p.m. CST
- Game attendance: 70,114
- Referee: Derek Anderson
- TV announcers (ESPN): Dave Pasch (play-by-play), Dusty Dvoracek (analyst), and Tom Luginbill (sideline)

Game information

First quarter

- (3:12) OSU – Jayden Fielding 44-yard field goal (Drive: 5 plays, 27 yards, 2:35; Ohio State 3-0)

Second quarter

- No scoring

Third quarter

- No scoring

Fourth quarter

- (14:55) MIZ – Cody Schrader 7-yard run (Harrison Mevis kick) (Drive: 8 plays, 95 yards, 4:30; Missouri 7-3)
- (5:12) MIZ – Luther Burden III 7-yard pass from Brady Cook (Harrison Mevis kick) (Drive: 13 plays, 91 yards, 6:10; Missouri 14-3)

Statistics	MIZZ	OSU
First downs	19	12
Total yards	331	203
Rushing yards	203	97
Passing yards	128	106
Passing: Comp–Att–Int	11–18–0	10–24–0
Time of possession	33:53	26:07

Team	Category	Player	Statistics
Missouri	Passing	Brady Cook	11–18, 128 yards, 1 TD
Missouri	Rushing	Cody Schrader	29 carries, 128 yards, 1 TD
Missouri	Receiving	Marquis Johnson	1 reception, 50 yards
Ohio State	Passing	Lincoln Kienholz	6–17, 86 yards
Ohio State	Rushing	TreVeyon Henderson	19 carries, 72 yards
Ohio State	Receiving	Emeka Egbuka	6 receptions, 63 yards

== Coaching staff ==
Name	Position	Seasons at Missouri	Alma mater
Eliah Drinkwitz	Head Coach	4	Arkansas Tech (2004)
Al Pogue	Cornerbacks	2	Alabama State (1996)
Kirby Moore	Offensive coordinator/ Quarterbacks	1	Boise State (2013)
Blake Baker	Defensive coordinator/safeties	2	Tulane (2004)
Erik Link	Special teams coordinator/tight ends	4	Drake (2003)
Al Davis	Defensive line (Interior)	3	Arkansas (2012)
Jacob Peeler	Wide receivers	2	Louisiana Tech (2007)
Brandon Jones	Offensive line	1	Texas Tech (2007)
Curtis Luper	Running backs	4	Stephen F. Austin (1996)
Kevin Peoples	Defensive line (Edge)	2	Carroll College (1992)
D. J. Smith	Co-defensive coordinator/linebackers/recruiting coordinator	4	Appalachian State (2010)
David Blackwell	Senior defensive analyst	1	East Carolina (1997)

== Players drafted into the NFL ==
Round	Pick	Player	Position	NFL Club
1	27	Darius Robinson	EDGE	Arizona Cardinals
2	61	Ennis Rakestraw	CB	Detroit Lions
3	91	Ty'Ron Hopper	LB	Green Bay Packers
4	114	Javon Foster	OL	Jacksonville Jaguars
5	145	Kris Abrams-Draine	CB	Denver Broncos
5	151	Jaylon Carlies	S	Indianapolis Colts
