= Cody Schrader =

American football player (born 1999)

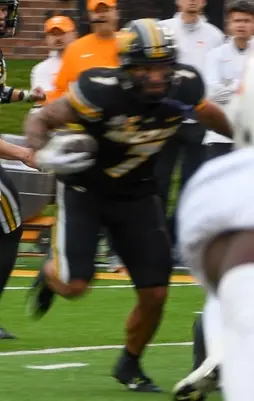
- Schrader with the Missouri Tigers in 2023

No. 25 – Denver Broncos
- Positions: Running back, kickoff returner
- Roster status: Practice squad

Personal information
- Born: September 8, 1999 (age 27); St. Louis, Missouri, U.S.
- Listed height: 5 ft 9 in (1.75 m)
- Listed weight: 214 lb (97 kg)

Career information
- High school: Lutheran South (St. Louis)
- College: Truman (2018–2021); Missouri (2022–2023)
- NFL draft: 2024: undrafted

Career history
- San Francisco 49ers (2024)*; Los Angeles Rams (2024–2025); Jacksonville Jaguars (2025); Houston Texans (2025); Denver Broncos (2025–present)
- * Offseason or practice squad member only

Awards and highlights
- Burlsworth Trophy (2023); Consensus All-American (2023); First-team All-SEC (2023); GLVC Co-Offensive Player of the Year (2021); 2× First-team All-GLVC (2020, 2021); Second-team All-GLVC (2019)

Career NFL statistics as of 2025
- Rush attempts: 1
- Rushing yards: 3
- Rushing touchdowns: 0
- Receptions: 1
- Receiving yards: 6
- Stats at Pro Football Reference

Cody Schrader (born September 8, 1999) is an American professional football running back and kickoff returner for the Denver Broncos of the National Football League (NFL). He played college football for the Truman Bulldogs and Missouri Tigers and was signed by the San Francisco 49ers as an undrafted free agent in 2024. He has also been a member of the Los Angeles Rams, Jacksonville Jaguars, and Houston Texans.

== Early life ==
Schrader attended Lutheran High School South in St. Louis, Missouri, where he rushed for 6,759 yards and 99 touchdowns. He was a four-time all-conference running back and linebacker, three-time conference player of the year, two-time second-team all-state, and first-team all-state in his senior year. Schrader committed to Truman State University to play Division II football.

== College career ==
=== Truman ===
In 2021, Schrader rushed for 2,074 yards and 25 touchdowns on 6.9 yards per carry, leading Division II in rushing. He was named the Great Lakes Valley Conference co-offensive player of the year. After the 2021 season, Schrader entered the transfer portal and walked-on to the Division I University of Missouri.

Schrader finished his career at Truman with 3,069 yards and 39 touchdowns on 479 carries, while also hauling in 60 receptions for 497 yards and two touchdowns. In two seasons, he set 17 program records including touchdowns, rushing attempts, rushing yards, total yards and total points in a single game, season, career, and touchdowns in a season and a career.

=== Missouri ===
In the 2022 season opener, Schrader rushed 17 times for 70 yards and a touchdown in a win over Louisiana Tech. He finished the 2022 season with 745 rushing yards and nine touchdowns on 170 carries and 19 receptions for 137 yards. Schrader was named an offensive captain for the 2023 season. In week 6 of the 2023 season, he had 14 carries for 114 yards and three touchdowns in a 49–39 loss to LSU. In week 8, Schrader totaled 170 yards and two touchdowns in a win over South Carolina, earning SEC Offensive Player of the Week honors. In week 9 against Tennessee, he set an SEC record of becoming the first player to record 200 running yards and 100 receiving yards in a single game. During the season, Missouri running back coach Curtis Luper compared Schrader to NFL Hall of Famer Thurman Thomas, describing him as a warrior.

Schrader set the Missouri single season rushing record in a 14–3 victory against Ohio State in the Cotton Bowl. His 1,627 rushing yards surpassed former Tigers running back Tyler Badie.

On January 4, 2024, Schrader declared for the 2024 NFL draft.

=== College statistics ===
Season	Team	Games	Rushing				Receiving			
Season	Team	GP	Att	Yds	Avg	TD	Rec	Yds	Avg	TD
2018	Truman	1	—	—	—	—	—	—	—	—
2019	Truman	12	96	605	6.3	7	30	231	7.7	1
2020	Truman	4	83	405	4.9	7	8	52	6.5	0
2021	Truman	12	300	2,074	6.9	25	22	214	9.7	1
2022	Missouri	13	170	745	4.4	9	29	137	7.2	0
2023	Missouri	13	276	1,627	5.8	14	22	191	8.7	0
Career		55	925	5,456	5.8	62	111	725	6.5	2

== Professional career ==
Pre-draft measurables
Height	Weight	Arm length	Hand span	Wingspan	40-yard dash	10-yard split	20-yard split	20-yard shuttle	Three-cone drill	Vertical jump	Broad jump	Bench press
5 ft 8 1/2 in (1.74 m)	202 lb (92 kg)	28 1/8 in (0.71 m)	9 1/8 in (0.23 m)	5 ft 8 5/8 in (1.74 m)	4.61 s	1.55 s	2.68 s	4.46 s	7.38 s	33.0 in (0.84 m)	8 ft 10 in (2.69 m)	20 reps
All values from NFL Combine/Pro Day

=== San Francisco 49ers ===
Schrader was signed by the San Francisco 49ers as an undrafted free agent on May 10, 2024. He was waived by San Francisco on August 27.

=== Los Angeles Rams ===
Schrader was claimed off waivers by the Los Angeles Rams on August 28, 2024. He was activated for the Rams' final regular-season game, rushing once for a three-yard gain and making one reception for six yards in L.A.'s 30–25 loss to the Seattle Seahawks.

On August 26, 2025, Schrader was waived by the Rams as part of final roster cuts and re-signed to the practice squad the next day.

=== Jacksonville Jaguars ===
On September 9, 2025, Schrader was signed to the Jacksonville Jaguars' active roster from the Rams practice squad after the Jaguars traded Tank Bigsby to the Philadelphia Eagles. On December 6, Schrader was waived by the Jaguars, failing to appear in a game for the club.

=== Houston Texans ===
On December 8, 2025, Schrader was claimed off waivers by the Houston Texans; however, he was waived by the team five days later.

=== Denver Broncos ===
On December 15, 2025, Schrader was claimed off waivers by the Denver Broncos. On December 25, Schrader was waived by the Broncos; he was re-signed to the practice squad two days later.

On January 26, 2026, Schrader signed a futures contract with the Broncos. On August 30, he was waived by Denver as a part of final roster cuts, but was re-signed to the practice squad the day after. On October 31, he was elevated to the active roster for Week 8 against the Kansas City Chiefs after RJ Harvey was placed on injured reserve.
