= 2023 Cotton Bowl Classic (December) =

Postseason college football bowl game (January 2023)

2023 Goodyear Cotton Bowl Classic
- CFP New Year's Six; 88th Cotton Bowl Classic
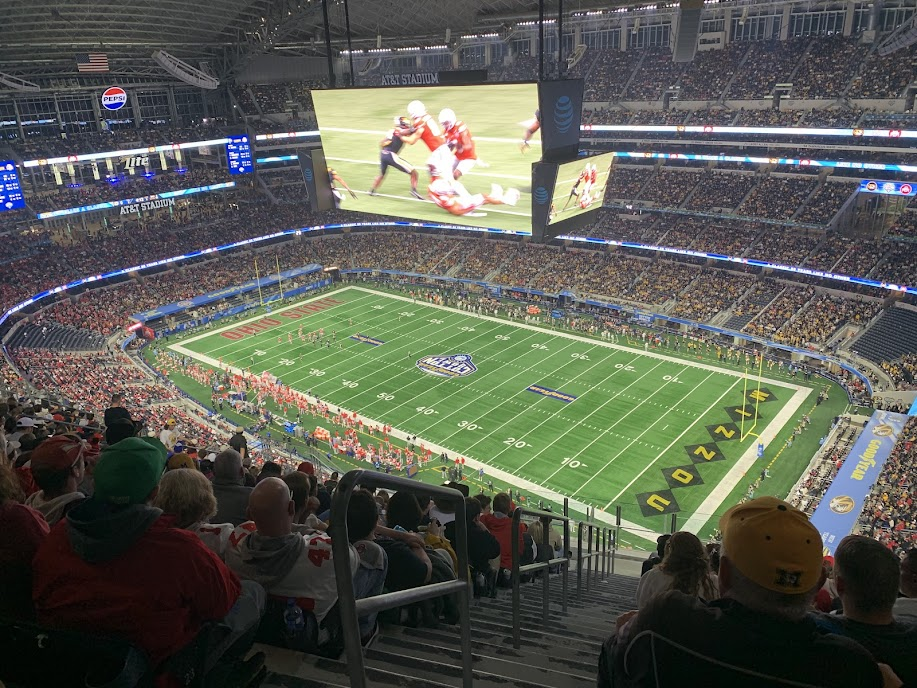
| Missouri Tigers | Ohio State Buckeyes |
| (10–2) | (11–1) |
| SEC | Big Ten |
| 14 | 3 |
| Head coach: Eliah Drinkwitz | Head coach: Ryan Day |
| AP / Coaches / CFP; 9 / 9 / 9 | AP / Coaches / CFP; 7 / 7 / 7 |
| | 1 | 2 | 3 | 4 | Total |
|---|---|---|---|---|---|
| Missouri | 0 | 0 | 0 | 14 | 14 |
| Ohio State | 3 | 0 | 0 | 0 | 3 |
- Date: December 29, 2023
- Season: 2023
- Stadium: AT&T Stadium
- Location: Arlington, Texas
- MVP: Offensive: Brady Cook (QB, Missouri); Defensive: Johnny Walker Jr. (DL, Missouri)
- Favorite: Ohio State by 3.5
- Referee: Derek Anderson (Big 12)
- Attendance: 70,114

United States TV coverage
- Network: ESPN; ESPN Radio
- Announcers: Dave Pasch (play-by-play), Dusty Dvoracek (analyst), and Tom Luginbill (sideline) (ESPN); Brad Sham (play-by-play), Kirk Morrison (analyst), and Taylor McGregor (sideline) (ESPN Radio)

The 2023 Cotton Bowl Classic was a college football bowl game played on December 29, 2023 at AT&T Stadium in Arlington, Texas. The 88th annual Cotton Bowl Classic featured Missouri of the Southeastern Conference (SEC) and Ohio State of the Big Ten Conference—teams selected at-large by the College Football Playoff selection committee. The game began at approximately 7:00 p.m. CST and was aired on ESPN. The Cotton Bowl Classic was one of the 2023–24 bowl games concluding the 2023 FBS football season. The game was sponsored by the Goodyear Tire and Rubber Company and was officially known as the Goodyear Cotton Bowl Classic.

== Teams ==
The game featured Ohio State from the Big Ten Conference and Missouri from the Southeastern Conference (SEC). This was the 13th all-time meeting between the Buckeyes and Tigers, with Ohio State leading the series 10–1–1. Their most recent prior meeting was September 19, 1998, a 35–14 Buckeyes win at home. Missouri's lone win came during the 1976 season.

=== Missouri ===
Missouri started the season 5–0, including a victory over No. 15 Kansas State on a game-winning 61-yard field goal by Harrison Mevis. The Tigers were subsequently ranked in the AP poll. However, they were defeated at home by LSU, 49–39, and three weeks later lost on the road to top-ranked Georgia, 30–21, ending their SEC title hopes. Missouri followed their loss to Georgia with a strong 36–7 win over Tennessee, and ended their season on a three-game winning streak and a 10–2 record (6–2 in SEC). The Tigers entered the bowl ranked ninth in all major polls.

This was Missouri's fourth Cotton Bowl Classic; the Tigers had a record of 2–1 in prior Cotton Bowls, losing the January 1946 edition and winning the January 2008 edition and January 2014 edition.

=== Ohio State ===
Ohio State entered the year looking to improve upon their 2022 season, when they received a College Football Playoff berth but lost to Georgia in the 2022 Peach Bowl semifinal. The Buckeyes earned marquee wins over Notre Dame and Penn State by margins of 17–14 and 20–12, respectively. However, in a top-three rivalry clash against Michigan in their final game of the regular season, the Buckeyes lost 30–24 in Ann Arbor, leaving them with an 11–1 record (8–1 in Big Ten) and out of playoff contention. The Buckeyes entered the bowl ranked seventh in all major polls.

This was Ohio State's third Cotton Bowl Classic; the Buckeyes won both of their prior two appearances, the January 1987 edition and December 2017 edition.

== Game summary ==
2023 Goodyear Cotton Bowl Classic

| Quarter | 1 | 2 | 3 | 4 | Total |
|---|---|---|---|---|---|
| No. 9 Missouri Tigers | 0 | 0 | 0 | 14 | 14 |
| No. 7 Ohio State Buckeyes | 3 | 0 | 0 | 0 | 3 |

at AT&T Stadium • Arlington, Texas

- Date: Friday, December 29, 2023
- Game time: 7:00 p.m. CST
- Game weather: N/A (indoor stadium with retractable roof)
- Game attendance: 70,114
- Referee: Derek Anderson
- TV announcers (ESPN): Dave Pasch (play-by-play), Dusty Dvoracek (analyst), and Tom Luginbill (sideline)
- Box score

Game information

First quarter

- (3:12) OSU – Jayden Fielding 44 yard field goal (Drive: 5 plays, 27 yards, 2:35; Ohio State 3–0)

Second quarter

- No scoring

Third quarter

- No scoring

Fourth quarter

- (14:55) MIZ – Cody Schrader 7 yard run, Harrison Mevis kick (Drive: 8 plays, 95 yards, 4:30; Missouri 7–3)
- (5:12) MIZ – Luther Burden III 7 yard pass from Brady Cook, Harrison Mevis kick (Drive: 13 plays, 91 yards, 6:10; Missouri 14–3)

=== Statistics ===
| Statistics | MIZZ | OSU |
|---|---|---|
| First downs | 19 | 12 |
| Total yards | 331 | 203 |
| Rushing yards | 203 | 97 |
| Passing yards | 128 | 106 |
| Passing: Comp–Att–Int | 11–18–0 | 10–24–0 |
| Time of possession | 33:53 | 26:07 |

| Team | Category | Player | Statistics |
|---|---|---|---|
| Missouri | Passing | Brady Cook | 11–18, 128 yards, 1 TD |
| Missouri | Rushing | Cody Schrader | 29 carries, 128 yards, 1 TD |
| Missouri | Receiving | Marquis Johnson | 1 reception, 50 yards |
| Ohio State | Passing | Lincoln Kienholz | 6–17, 86 yards |
| Ohio State | Rushing | TreVeyon Henderson | 19 carries, 72 yards |
| Ohio State | Receiving | Emeka Egbuka | 6 receptions, 63 yards |
