= Johnny "Red" Floyd Stadium =

Stadium in Murfreesboro, Tennessee, U.S.

Johnny "Red" Floyd Stadium/Horace Jones Field
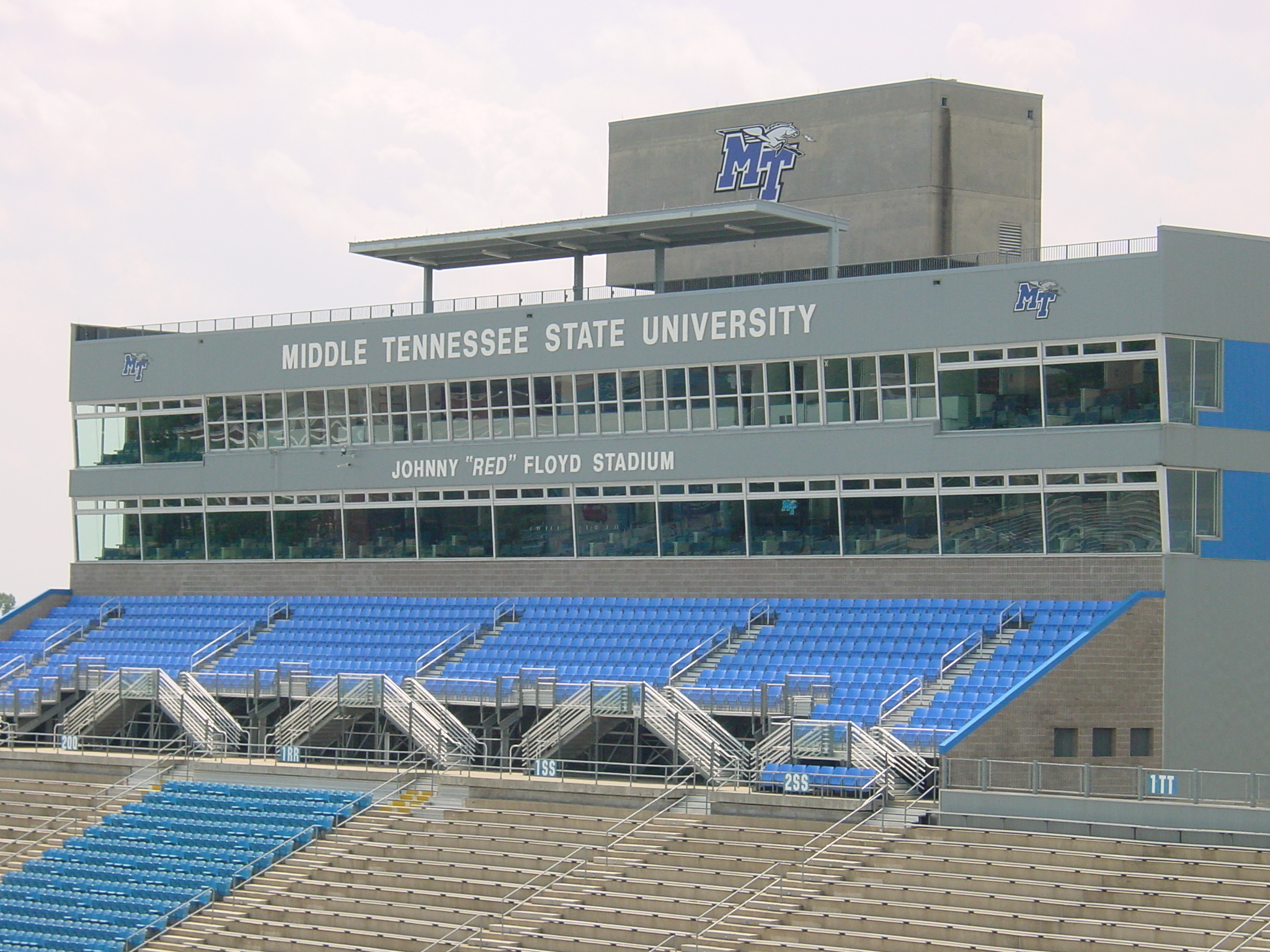
- Floyd Stadium pressbox

- Location in Tennessee Location in the United States
- Full name: Johnny "Red" Floyd Stadium/Horace Jones Field
- Former names: Horace Jones Field (1933–1979)
- Location: 1327 Faulkinberry Drive, Murfreesboro, Tennessee, U.S. 37132
- Coordinates: 35.850513°N 86.368223°W
- Owner: Middle Tennessee State University
- Capacity: 27,303
- Executive suites: 16 indoor, 38 outdoor
- Surface: Grass (1933–1969); AstroTurf (1970–2005); Shaw Sports PowerBlade HP (2006–2014); Shaw Sports Legion 46 (2014–2025); Shaw GameOn Legion 2.0 (2") (2025- present)
- Record attendance: 30,502 on September 10, 2011 (Georgia Tech)

Construction
- Built: 1933
- Opened: October 14, 1933; 93 years ago
- Renovated: 1997–1998
- Expanded: 1940, 1960, 1968
- Cost: $25 million (1997 renovation)
- Architect: Burkhalter-Hickerson

Tenants
- MTSU Blue Raiders (NCAA) (1933–present); Grantland Rice Bowl (1964–1968)

Website
- www.goblueraiders.com

Johnny "Red" Floyd Stadium is a stadium in Murfreesboro, Tennessee, United States. It is primarily used for American football, and is the home field of the Middle Tennessee State University Blue Raiders. It previously served as the home stadium for Riverdale and Oakland high schools, for a long period when those schools did not have stadiums. It later was the home stadium for Siegel High School for a short period, when construction for a stadium was delayed. The stadium is named for Middle Tennessee State University football coach Johnny Floyd.

== History ==
The stadium was officially named Johnny "Red" Floyd Stadium/Horace Jones Field in 1968. Set on the northwest end of campus, Floyd Stadium has undergone a multimillion-dollar renovation over the past few years to make it one of the premier facilities in the region and the Conference USA. The stadium opened its doors on October 14, 1933, with a scoreless tie against Jacksonville State. Originally built as two sideline grandstands on either side of an outdoor track, it was enlarged in 1940, 1960, 1968, and most recently in 1998 to bring it to its current configuration as an octagonal bowl.

=== Renovations ===
The move to NCAA Division I-A (FBS) football was the catalyst for the most recent renovation to Floyd Stadium. On August 24, 1995, the University announced plans for a US$25 million renovation, which was approved by the State Building Commission. After a lengthy bid process, ground was officially broken for the stadium in January 1997 with Turner Construction handling the project.

Upon completion, the stadium featured 30,788 seats with only the east side grandstands remaining from the original structure. The old press box gave way to a five-story tower including luxury suites on the third level, a large press area and a few suites on the fourth level, and a camera deck on the fifth level. The renovation also included the addition of more chair-back seats as well as a club level.

The first game in the renovated stadium took place on September 5, 1998. The game, in which Middle Tennessee hosted local rival Tennessee State, drew a then-school record 27,568 fans. The attendance helped push Middle Tennessee over the top for its I-A qualifying attendance of 17,000 per game.

The most recent upgrade came during the summer of 2007 when a new state-of-the-art video board was installed. The 18-by-32-foot (5.5 by 9.8 m) Daktronics display board enhances the overall atmosphere and bring fans even closer to the action.

During the summer of 2006, a new synthetic surface was installed to replace the outdated artificial turf. The school decided to use the Sportexe PowerBlade, a special monofilament polyethylene infilled system designed to maximize player speed and performance and provide superior shock absorbency. Middle Tennessee was the first school in the country to use this top-of-the line surface. In 2012, a new stadium club was built from a $1 million donation from Jeff Hendrix.

In mid-2014, the field surface was again renovated with the installation of Shaw Sports Turf's Legion 46 synthetic turf.

In MTSU's "Build Blue" campaign, the 85,000 sq. foot Stephen and Denise Smith Student Athlete and Performance Center was added on to the north endzone side of the stadium. This facility houses a new weight room, training room, equipment rooms, football offices and meeting rooms, and the SRM Concrete Club, a hospitality and viewing area for fans.

The facility also saw upgrades to the videoboard and sound system, integrating with the new state of the art control room installed in Murphy Center for video elements and production. The new 34ft by 60ft (10 by 18m) Daktronics LED video board allows for enhanced viewing and fan experience during football games and events.

== Features ==
In addition to the spectator facilities, the stadium complex includes a team meeting room, position meeting rooms, a 10,000-square-foot (930 m^{2}) weight room for all Middle Tennessee teams, an academic center for Blue Raider student-athletes, and access to Murphy Athletic Center from the stadium via a walkway. The stadium also allows for further expansion that would provide an increase of approximately 40,000 seats, putting capacity over the 70,000 mark.

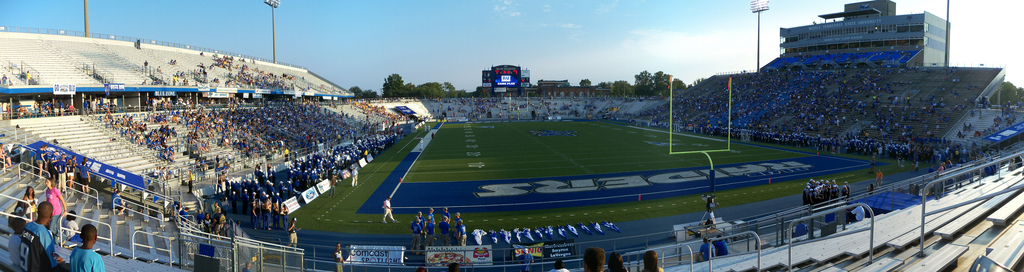
The interior of the stadium as viewed from the student section.

== See also ==
- List of NCAA Division I FBS football stadiums
