= Matt Weiss =

Matt Weiss may refer to:

- Matt Weiss (American football) (born 1983), American football coach
- Matt Weiss (soccer) (born 1952), American soccer goalkeeper
