= Princeton Fant =

American football player (born 1999)

No. 85 – Dallas Cowboys
- Position: Tight end
- Roster status: Injured reserve

Personal information
- Born: March 11, 1999 (age 27); Nashville, Tennessee, U.S.
- Listed height: 6 ft 2 in (1.88 m)
- Listed weight: 245 lb (111 kg)

Career information
- High school: La Vergne (La Vergne, Tennessee)
- College: Tennessee (2017–2022)
- NFL draft: 2023: undrafted

Career history
- Dallas Cowboys (2023–present)
- Stats at Pro Football Reference

Princeton De'leon Fant (born March 11, 1999) is an American professional football tight end for the Dallas Cowboys of the National Football League (NFL). He played college football for the Tennessee Volunteers.

== Early life ==
Fant attended La Vergne High School in La Vergne, Tennessee. As a sophomore, Fant recorded 14 receptions for 326, while also rushing for 141 yards on nine attempts. During spring practices following his sophomore year, Fant tore his ACL, prematurely ending his junior year of high school football. In addition, Fant would miss the majority of his senior year, undergoing more surgery on his ACL. A top recruit from the state of Tennessee, Fant committed to play college football at the University of Tennessee.

== College career ==
During the 2017 season, Fant would redshirt. He played sparingly at running back the following season, before switching to the tight end position. During the 2020 season, Fant tallied 12 catches for 103 receiving yards, and one touchdown. His first career and lone touchdown of the season came on a six-yard pass from Harrison Bailey against Vanderbilt. As a redshirt senior the next season, Fant posted 13 receptions, 149 yards, and one touchdown. At the season's end, he announced that he would return for a sixth season at Tennessee. In 2022, Fant was accountable for nine total touchdowns, five rushing, three receiving, and one passing. The passing touchdown came on 68-yard pass to Jalin Hyatt on a trick play against UT Martin. At the end of the season, Fant announced that he would enter the 2023 NFL draft.

Year	Team	Games	Receiving				Rushing			
Year	Team	GP	Rec	Yards	Avg	TD	Att	Yards	Avg	TD
2017	Tennessee	DNP								
2018	Tennessee	1	0	0	0	0	3	7	2.3	0
2019	Tennessee	2	2	15	7.5	0	0	0	0	0
2020	Tennessee	7	12	103	8.6	1	0	0	0	0
2021	Tennessee	10	16	220	13.8	1	0	0	0	0
2022	Tennessee	13	22	241	11.0	3	6	17	2.8	5
Career		33	52	579	11.1	5	9	24	2.7	5

== Professional career ==
Pre-draft measurables
Height	Weight	Arm length	Hand span	Wingspan	Bench press
6 ft 1 1/4 in (1.86 m)	243 lb (110 kg)	31 in (0.79 m)	9 3/4 in (0.25 m)	6 ft 4 1/4 in (1.94 m)	19 reps
All values from Pro Day

Fant signed with the Dallas Cowboys as an undrafted free agent on May 12, 2023. He was waived on August 29, and re-signed to the practice squad. Throughout his rookie season, Fant was elevated from the practice squad twice, appearing exclusively on special teams. He signed a reserve/future contract with Dallas on January 15, 2024.

Fant was waived by the Cowboys on August 27, 2024, and re-signed to the practice squad. He was promoted to the active roster on November 27.

On August 26, 2025, Fant was waived by the Cowboys as part of final roster cuts and was re-signed to the practice squad the next day.

On March 13, 2026, Fant re-signed with the Cowboys. On August 4, Fant suffered a torn ACL and partially torn MCL and was placed on season-ending injured reserve.

== Personal life ==
Fant is the cousin of New Orleans Saints tight end Noah Fant, and he has a daughter named Aaliyah.
