= Smyrna High School =

Smyrna High School may refer to:

- Smyrna High School (Delaware)
- Smyrna High School (Tennessee)
