= Rutherford County Virtual School =

Location
- 100 Wise Dr; Smyrna, Tennessee; United States
- Coordinates: 36.0084666°N 86.4899195°W

Information
- Type: Public school, Virtual school
- Established: c. 2020
- School district: Rutherford County
- CEEB code: 430068
- Principal: Jessica Supakhan
- Teaching staff: 16.00 (FTE)
- Grades: 3-12
- Enrollment: 361 (2023—2024)
- Student to teacher ratio: 22.56
- Colors: Red; Blue
- Athletics: TSSAA
- Nickname: Trailblazer
- Website: rcso.rcschools.net

Rutherford County Virtual School is a virtual school in the Rutherford County school district located in Smyrna, Tennessee, United States. The school serves grades 3 to 12. All students who are residents of Rutherford County can enroll in the school. This school is the first virtual school to open in the county in 2020 with an enrollment of 189 students.

== History ==
Rutherford County Virtual School was founded in 2020 as the 49th school to open in the school district. The first principal and current of the Rutherford County Virtual School is Dr. Jessica Supakhan.

== Curriculum ==
Rutherford County Virtual School uses the Connections Academy (or Pearson Connexus) platform to deliver education to students. Elementary and middle school grade students are taught by teachers who work at Rutherford County Schools. Courses at the school are taught by certified teachers in the State of Tennessee.

== Athletics ==
Rutherford County Virtual School has a co-op partnership with Central Magnet School, allowing Rutherford County Virtual School students to participate in athletic programs from Central Magnet School. There are currently 12 varsity teams in a co-op partnership, which include baseball, boys and girls basketball, softball, volleyball, golf, cross country, track, cheerleading, dance, archery, and swimming. In the future, the school expects to add 4 more varsity teams, such as tennis, bowling, wrestling, and soccer.

== Clubs ==
- Aerospace Club
- Chess
- Community Service Club
- Creative Writing Club
- Fantasy Football Club
- Fishing Club
- French Club
- Glee Club
- High School Hangout
- Instrumental Music Club
- Life Skills Club
- Microwave Mug Cooking Club
- Senior Beta Club
- Show and Tell
- Student Leadership Club
- Tech/Coding Club
- eSports
- Storytelling Club
- Small Animals Club
