= Robert Myers (offensive lineman) =

American football player (born 1991)

No. 70
- Position: Guard

Personal information
- Born: December 26, 1991 (age 34); Chicago, Illinois, U.S.
- Listed height: 6 ft 5 in (1.96 m)
- Listed weight: 325 lb (147 kg)

Career information
- High school: La Vergne (La Vergne, Tennessee)
- College: Tennessee State
- NFL draft: 2015: 5th round, 176th overall pick

Career history
- Baltimore Ravens (2015)*; Indianapolis Colts (2015)*; Baltimore Ravens (2015)*; Denver Broncos (2015); Seattle Seahawks (2016–2017)*; Memphis Express (2019); Seattle Dragons (2020)*; Team 9 (2020)*; Seattle Dragons (2020); New Jersey Generals (2022–2023); Houston Roughnecks (2024)*
- * Offseason or practice squad member only

Awards and highlights
- Super Bowl champion (50)
- Stats at Pro Football Reference

Robert Myers (born December 26, 1991) is an American former professional football guard. He played college football at Tennessee State, and was selected by the Baltimore Ravens in the fifth round of the 2015 NFL draft.

== Early life ==
Myers attended La Vergne High School in La Vergne, Tennessee.

== College career ==
Myers played at Tennessee State from 2010 to 2014. In his senior season in 2014, he started in all 12 games. He was named the All-Ohio Valley Conference second-team for his accomplishments in the 2015 season.

== Professional career ==
=== Baltimore Ravens (first stint) ===
Myers was selected by the Baltimore Ravens in the fifth round (176th overall pick) of the 2015 NFL draft. On September 5, 2015, he was released by the Ravens.

=== Indianapolis Colts ===
On September 6, 2015, Myers was claimed off waivers by the Indianapolis Colts. On September 11, 2015, he was waived by the Colts.

=== Baltimore Ravens (second stint) ===
On September 21, 2015, Myers was signed to the Ravens' practice squad.

=== Denver Broncos ===
On December 30, 2015, Myers was signed off the Ravens' practice squad to the Denver Broncos active roster.

In the 2015 season, Myers and the Broncos made the Super Bowl. Myers was inactive for Super Bowl 50. The Broncos defeated the Carolina Panthers by a score of 24–10.

On September 3, 2016, Myers was waived by the Broncos.

=== Seattle Seahawks ===
On September 27, 2016, Myers was signed to the Seattle Seahawks' practice squad. He signed a reserve/future contract with the Seahawks on January 20, 2017.

On August 8, 2017, Myers was waived/injured by the Seahawks and placed on injured reserve. He was released by the team on August 14, 2017.

=== Memphis Express ===
In 2018, Myers signed with the Memphis Express of the Alliance of American Football for the 2019 season. He was waived on March 7, 2019, and re-signed on March 13, 2019. The league ceased operations in April 2019.

=== XFL ===
In October 2019, Myers was selected by the Seattle Dragons of the XFL in the 2020 XFL draft. He was waived during final roster cuts on January 22, 2020. Myers signed with the Team 9 practice squad during the regular season. He was re-signed by the Dragons on March 9, 2020. He had his contract terminated when the league suspended operations on April 10, 2020.

=== The Spring League ===
Myers was selected by the Conquerors of The Spring League during its player selection draft on October 11, 2020. He remained on the roster in May 2021.

=== New Jersey Generals ===
On March 10, 2022, Myers was drafted by the New Jersey Generals of the United States Football League (USFL). He was placed on the injured reserve list on May 9, 2023. The Generals folded when the XFL and USFL merged to create the United Football League (UFL).

=== Houston Roughnecks ===
On January 5, 2024, Myers was selected by the Houston Roughnecks during the 2024 UFL dispersal draft. He was waived on March 21.
