= Arion Carter =

American football player (born 2004)

No. 7 – Tennessee Volunteers
- Position: Linebacker
- Class: Senior

Personal information
- Born: October 16, 2004 (age 22)
- Listed height: 6 ft 3 in (1.91 m)
- Listed weight: 245 lb (111 kg)

Career information
- High school: Smyrna (Smyrna, Tennessee)
- College: Tennessee (2023–present)

Awards and highlights
- Second-team All-SEC (2025)
- Stats at ESPN

Arion Carter (born October 16, 2004) is an American college football linebacker for the Tennessee Volunteers.

== Early life ==
Carter attended and played high school football at Smyrna High School in Smyrna, Tennessee. During his senior season, he notched 92 tackles, three sacks, three forced fumbles, and an interception on defense, while on offense he rushed for 1,184 yards and 19 touchdowns on 185 carries, and was named Mr. Football for Class 6A and the Gatorade Tennessee Football Player of the Year. Coming out of high school, he was rated as a four-star recruit, and committed to play college football for the Tennessee Volunteers over offers from Alabama and Ohio State.

== College career ==
During his freshman season in 2023, Carter tallied 17 tackles in eight games before suffering a season-ending shoulder injury. Heading into the 2024 season, he earned a starting spot at linebacker. In week 10 of the 2024 season, Carter recorded a career-high ten tackles in a victory versus Kentucky. During the 2024 season, he totaled 68 tackles with seven being for a loss, six pass deflections, and an interception.
