= Oakland High School (Tennessee) =

- Oakland High School

Location
- 2225 Patriot Drive; Murfreesboro, Tennessee 37130; United States; 35.88258°N 86.35164°W

Information
- School type: Public High School, Vocational School (Mechatronics), International Baccalaureate
- Established: 1972
- School district: Rutherford County Schools
- CEEB code: 431619
- Principal: John Marshall
- Staff: LaToya Leavy, Shayne Martin, Katherine Mallari, Tim Roediger, Dr. Jason Kirby, Kristin Boyton
- Teaching staff: 135.20 (FTE)
- Grades: 9−12
- Gender: all
- Enrollment: 2,700 (2026)
- Average class size: 25-30 students
- Student to teacher ratio: 14.40
- Campus type: high school
- Color: Red Navy White
- Athletics: football, basketball, swimming, soccer, marching band
- Athletics conference: TSSAA District 7AAA, Region 4AAA, Football 6A
- Mascot: Patriot
- Website: https://ohs.rcschools.net/

Oakland High School (OHS) is located in Murfreesboro, Tennessee, U.S. It has approximately 2,300 students. OHS is part of the fourth largest school system in the state. OHS serves the Rutherford County School school district. Since 2007, Oakland High School has offered the IB Diploma Programme.

== History ==
OHS opened in 1972 along with a sister school Riverdale High School (RHS). The schools were the first two high schools built after Central Magnet School in the Rutherford County school system.

While the school began as a traditional high school, OHS would add specialized programs to its curriculum, such as the AP program, the IB program, and vocational programs like the Mechatronics program. These programs led to the school becoming a choice school through OHS Choice.

In the early 1990s, OHS added a separate annex building to accommodate its growth. In 2007, construction began on an additional hallway for the annex to add more classrooms, which was completed in 2008.

In 2022, the Rutherford County School board proposed a renovation to OHS, including 140,000 square feet of new construction. The purpose of this renovation was to connect all of Oakland High School's buildings together. The Rutherford County Budget, Finance, and Investment committee met in April 2023 and approved the allocation of $47 million to the project. The construction began in the summer of the 2023 and was finished in August 2025. This new expansion includes: a two-story hallway to connect the annex to the original 1972 main building, a shorter hallway connecting an outdoor building, a new courtyard, and a new auditorium.

=== Leadership ===
In June 2018, Bill Spurlock was assigned the role of Director of Schools after 10 years of service as the principal of OHS. He was replaced by John Marshall in August 2018, who has been in the role since.

=== Sports rivalry ===
In 1972, students from Central High School were split between OHS and Riverdale High School, leading to a fierce rivalry between the students. This rivalry was intensified by fierce competition in football and basketball.

While the rivalry has cooled down in recent history due to the founding of Blackman High School, and Siegel High School, it still remains very strong. In October 2022, a shooting occurred in the parking lot of a Riverdale-Oakland football game. Nobody was injured.

== Mechatronics ==
OHS offers an award-winning Mechatronics program in partnership with Motlow State Community College. This program allows students to earn up to 61 college credit hours in Mechatronics Engineering. Optionally, students can enroll in the AAS program, in which they can earn a Mechatronics Associate degree through Motlow while attending OHS. Multiple Tennessee Universities, such as MTSU, UT Chattanooga, and Tennessee Tech offer a "2+2 program", which allows students to obtain a Mechatronics Bachelor's degree in 2 years if they obtain the Mechatronics ASS degree.

Additionally, students can earn multiple certifications, as listed below:

- Siemens Level 1 certification
- FANUC robotic Material Handling Tool and Programming Level 1 certification
- Solidworks CSWA certification
- 6 Precision Measurement Instruments (PMI) certifications
- 3 different Yaskawa Robotics certifications
- Siemens Level 2 certification through Motlow, if the student completes the ASS path.

The school won Tennessee's 2017 Excellence in action, Manufacturing award for its Mechatronics and automotive technology programs. In 2017, Betsy DeVos visited the school to commemorate this achievement.

Leonard Ciletti has led the OHS Mechatronics program since its inception.

== Notable alumni ==
- Bryan M. Clayton - businessman and real estate investor, CEO and cofounder of GreenPal
- Isaiah Horton, American college football wide receiver for the Alabama Crimson Tide
- Jordan James, NFL running back for the San Francisco 49ers
- Bayer Mack, writer, record executive, and film producer
- Stephen McAdoo, NFL/CFL player with the Cleveland Browns and Shreveport Pirates, CFL Coach, currently offensive line coach for the Toronto Argonauts
- Daune Morris, American college football running back for the Tennessee Volunteers
- Robert J. Schwalb, (writer), Sci-Fi/Fantasy Author, Game Designer
- Emmanuel Smith, American football linebacker and Super Bowl LIV champion
- JaCoby Stevens, American football safety
- Woodi Washington, American college football cornerback for the Oklahoma Sooners
- Chris Young, country music singer
- Jordan McCullough, American Idol Finalist,
