= Quinton Patton =

American football player (born 1990)

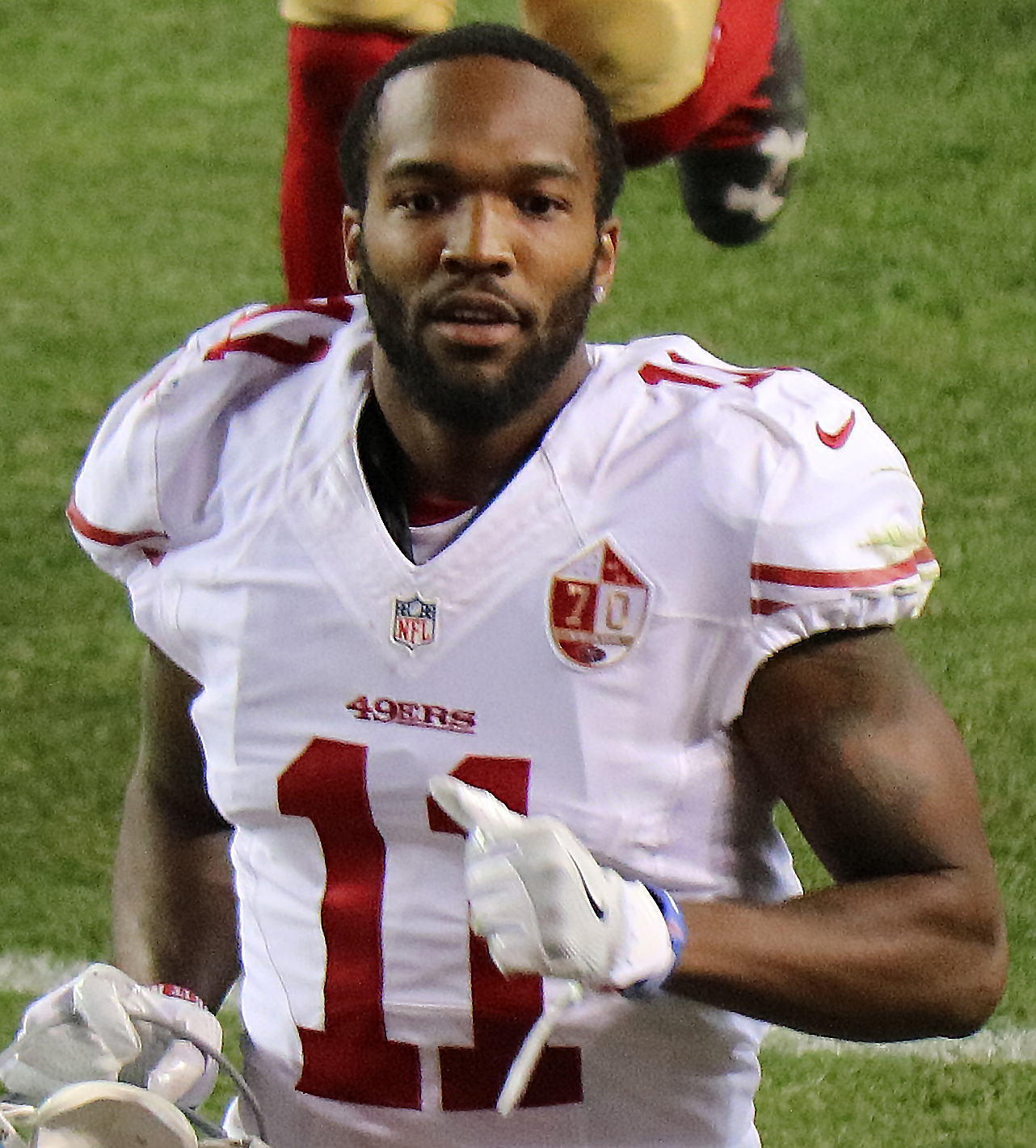
- Patton with the San Francisco 49ers in 2016

No. 11
- Position: Wide receiver

Personal information
- Born: August 9, 1990 (age 36); Nashville, Tennessee, U.S.
- Listed height: 6 ft 0 in (1.83 m)
- Listed weight: 204 lb (93 kg)

Career information
- High school: La Vergne (La Vergne, Tennessee)
- College: Coffeyville (2008–2010); Louisiana Tech (2011–2012)
- NFL draft: 2013: 4th round, 128th overall pick

Career history
- San Francisco 49ers (2013–2016); New York Jets (2017)*; Birmingham Iron (2019)
- * Offseason or practice squad member only

Awards and highlights
- Second-team All-American (2012); First-team All-WAC (2012); Second-team All-WAC (2011)

Career NFL statistics
- Receptions: 73
- Receiving yards: 880
- Rushing yards: 51
- Return yards: 199
- Total touchdowns: 1
- Stats at Pro Football Reference

Quinton Arne Patton (born August 9, 1990) is an American former professional football player who was a wide receiver in the National Football League (NFL). He played college football for the Louisiana Tech Bulldogs, and was selected by the San Francisco 49ers in the fourth round of the 2013 NFL draft.

== Early life ==
Patton was born in Nashville, Tennessee. He grew up playing little league football for the UNA Bears. From there, he went on to play football and baseball at Stratford High School, before later transferring to La Vergne High School in La Vergne, Tennessee, and playing high school football for the La Vergne Wolverines. He came out of high school as a 3-star recruit according to Rivals.com and was committed to Louisiana Tech University.

== College career ==
Patton attended Coffeyville Community College for three years before transferring to Louisiana Tech University, turning down offers from South Florida University and Troy University. At Louisiana Tech, he played for the Louisiana Tech Bulldogs football team in 2011 and 2012. During his first year, Patton was named a first-team All-Western Athletic Conference (WAC) selection after he had 79 receptions for 1,202 yards and 11 touchdowns. In 2012, he had 104 receptions for 1,392 yards and 13 touchdowns, and was again a first-team All-WAC selection.

== Professional career ==
Pre-draft measurables
Height	Weight	Arm length	Hand span	40-yard dash	10-yard split	20-yard split	20-yard shuttle	Three-cone drill	Vertical jump	Broad jump	Bench press
6 ft 0 in (1.83 m)	204 lb (93 kg)	32 7/8 in (0.84 m)	9 3/8 in (0.24 m)	4.48 s	1.56 s	2.60 s	4.01 s	6.91 s	37 in (0.94 m)	9 ft 10 in (3.00 m)	8 reps
All values from NFL Combine/Pro Day.

=== San Francisco 49ers ===
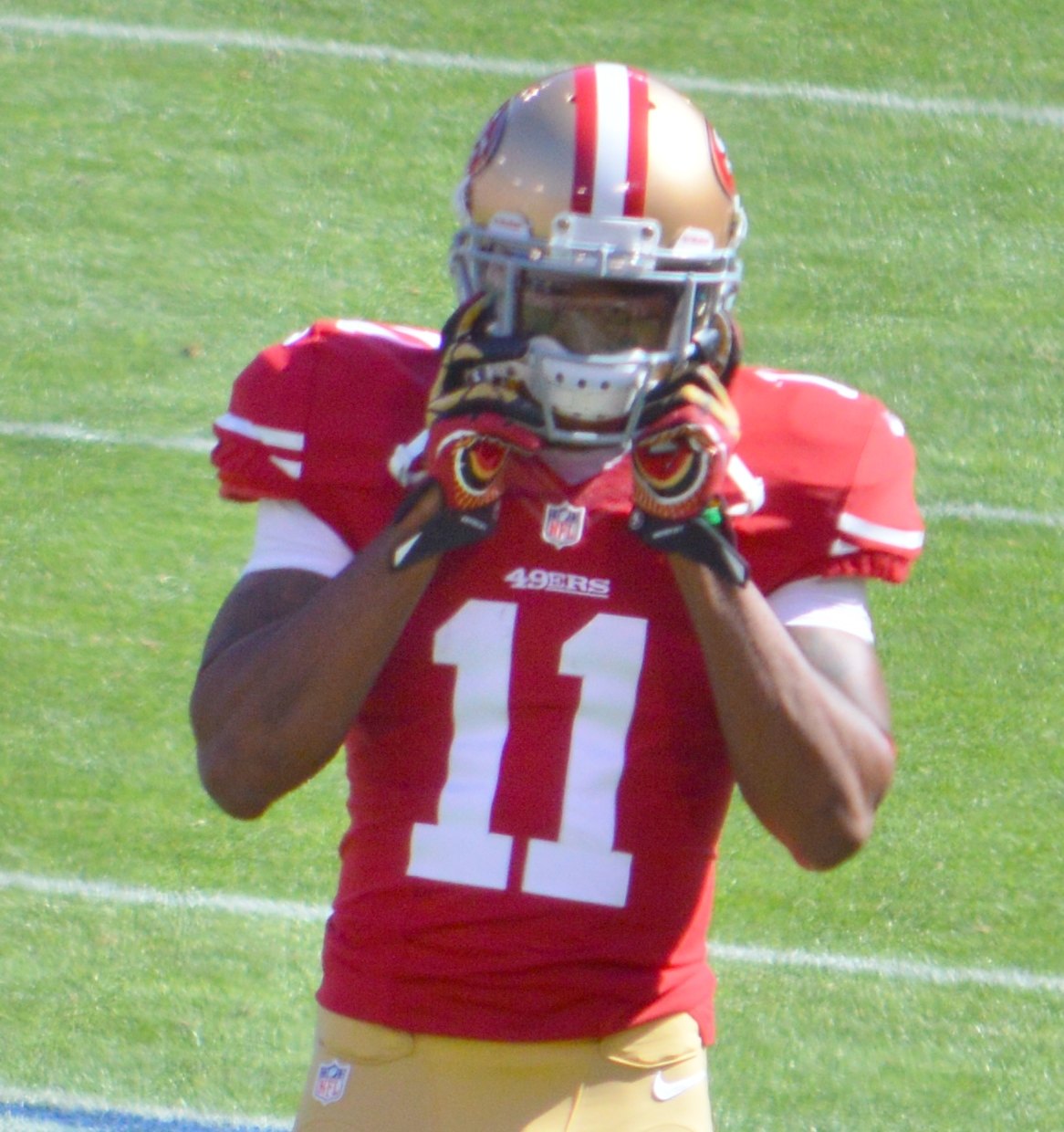
Patton with the 49ers in 2013

==== 2013 season ====
Patton was selected by the San Francisco 49ers in the fourth round, with the 128th overall pick, of the 2013 NFL draft. So excited by his new team that he flew at once to San Francisco, Patton was warned away from the 49ers training camp lest the organization receive a fine for his early presence, which would have been a violation of NFL league rules. Nevertheless, Patton's action rebounded in his favor when Coach Jim Harbaugh took favorable notice of Patton's enthusiasm.

Patton started the season as a backup to the 49ers' No. 3 receiver, Mario Manningham. Having suffered a foot fracture that sidelined him after the fourth game of the season, Patton sat out virtually all of his rookie year with the 49ers and had one reception for zero yards prior to the final regular season game against the Arizona Cardinals.

However, Patton made a substantial impact in the Arizona game, most notably by catching a 29-yard sideline pass on the final drive of the game, which enabled the 49ers' winning field goal. Patton also sprinted for 26 yards on the first 49er series in the contest as well as throwing an important block later in the first quarter that helped create a long reception by fellow receiver Anquan Boldin. Coach Harbaugh praised Patton's comeback from his injury and stated he was "excited" by Patton's progress. The 49ers had been limited by the lack of a full complement of receiving options during most of the 2013 season.

Patton had no receptions in his first NFL playoff game against the Green Bay Packers at Lambeau Field, but made a notable 23-yard reception against the Carolina Panthers in his second post season experience, for the game's initial first down.

==== 2014 season ====
Patton played in only four games throughout the 2014 season. In the regular season finale against the Arizona Cardinals, he caught a very critical pass for a 35-yard reception as the 49ers won by a score of 20–17.

==== 2015 season ====
On October 18, 2015, Patton caught his first NFL touchdown from Colin Kaepernick in the 49ers' 25–20 win over the Baltimore Ravens.

==== 2016 season ====
Patton started all 14 games he played in registering 37 catches for 408 yards. He was placed on injured reserve on December 20, 2016.

=== New York Jets ===
On March 23, 2017, Patton signed with the New York Jets. On June 5, 2017, Patton was placed on injured reserve with a foot injury, and was later released with an injury settlement.

=== Birmingham Iron ===
In 2019, Patton joined the Birmingham Iron of the Alliance of American Football. On February 9, 2019, Patton made his AAF debut in the season-opener against the Memphis Express, catching four passes for 107 yards. The league ceased operations in April 2019.
