= Alex Young (athlete) =

American athlete (born 1994)

Personal information
- Born: September 1, 1994 (age 31) Nashville, Tennessee, U.S.
- Home town: LaVergne, Tennessee, U.S.
- Height: 6 ft 2 in (188 cm)

Sport
- Sport: Track and Field
- Event: Hammer throw
- College team: Southeastern Louisiana Lions 2014-17; Gardner–Webb Runnin' Bulldogs; 2012-14
Medal record
Men's Athletics
Representing the United States
NACAC Championships
Silver medal – second place	2018 Toronto	Hammer Throw
NACAC U23 Championships
Bronze medal – third place	2016 San Salvador	Hammer throw
Representing Southeastern Louisiana Lions/ Southland Conference
NCAA Indoor Track and Field Championships
Gold medal – first place	2017 Albuquerque	35libs Weight Throw
Gold medal – first place	2016 Birmingham	35libs Weight Throw
NCAA Outdoor Track and Field Championships
Silver medal – second place	2017 Eugene	Hammer Throw

Alex Young (born September 1, 1994) is an American athlete who competes predominantly in the hammer throw.

== Early life ==
Young grew up in Nashville, Tennessee. He moved multiple times to find the best training group, working two jobs to earn enough money and persevering to live his dream as a professional athlete.

== Professional career ==
He represented the United States at the 2020 Summer Olympics and finished twelfth in Eugene, Oregon at the 2022 World Athletics Championships.

Young has represented his country competing in the 2013 Pan American Junior Athletics Championships in Colombia and at the 2016 NACAC U23 Championships in El Salvador. He also competed at the 2016 Olympic Trials prior to competing in the 2017 World Championships in which he finished 20th and 2022 World Championships where Young placed 12th in the final.

On 28 March 2026, he placed third behind Rudy Winkler and Trey Knight in the hammer throw at the USATF Winter Long Throws National Championship in Arizona with a throw of 74.57 metres.

== NCAA ==
Young competed collegiately for Southeastern Louisiana University (SLU). In 2016 he became the first SLU athlete in any sport to win a national championship at the Division I level when he won the NCAA weight throw national title. He followed that by finishing second in the 2017 NCAA hammer throw behind Cornell's Rudy Winkler.

Year	Competition	Venue	Position	Event	Notes
Representing Southeastern Louisiana University
2017	NCAA Division I Outdoor Track and Field Championships	University of Oregon	2nd	Hammer	73.66 m (241 ft 8 in)
2017	NCAA Division I Outdoor Track and Field Championships East Prelims	University of Kentucky	48th	Shot put	Foul
2017	Southland Outdoor Track and Field Championships	University of New Orleans	1st	Hammer	69.59 m (228 ft 4 in)
2017	Southland Outdoor Track and Field Championships	University of New Orleans	1st	Shot put	17.67 m (58 ft 0 in)
2017	Southland Outdoor Track and Field Championships	University of New Orleans	4th	Discus	50.92 m (167 ft 1 in)
2016	NCAA Division I Indoor Track and Field Championships	Birmingham CrossPlex	1st	Weight throw	23.80 m (78 ft 1 in)
2016	Southland Indoor Track and Field Championships	Birmingham CrossPlex	1st	Hammer	20.72 m (68 ft 0 in)
2016	Southland Indoor Track and Field Championships	Birmingham CrossPlex	2nd	Shot put	16.52 m (54 ft 2 in)
2015	NCAA Division I Outdoor Track and Field Championships	University of Oregon	10th	Hammer	66.50 m (218 ft 2 in)
2015	Southland Outdoor Track and Field Championships	Southeastern Louisiana University	1st	Hammer	64.66 m (212 ft 2 in)
2015	Southland Outdoor Track and Field Championships	Southeastern Louisiana University	1st	Shot put	17.93 m (58 ft 10 in)
2015	Southland Outdoor Track and Field Championships	Southeastern Louisiana University	2nd	Discus	53.68 m (176 ft 1 in)
2015	NCAA Division I Indoor Track and Field Championships	University of Arkansas	15th	Weight throw	20.01 m (65 ft 8 in)
2015	Southland Indoor Track and Field Championships	JDL Fast Track	1st	Hammer	20.72 m (68 ft 0 in)
2015	Southland Indoor Track and Field Championships	JDL Fast Track	2nd	Shot put	16.52 m (54 ft 2 in)
Representing Gardner–Webb University
2014	NCAA Division I Outdoor Track and Field Championships	University of Oregon	17th	Hammer	61.90 m (203 ft 1 in)
2014	Big South Outdoor Track and Field Championships	Winthrop University	1st	Hammer	59.88 m (196 ft 5 in)
2014	Big South Outdoor Track and Field Championships	Winthrop University	11th	Shot put	14.29 m (46 ft 11 in)
2014	Big South Outdoor Track and Field Championships	Winthrop University	13th	Discus	39.90 m (130 ft 11 in)
2014	NCAA Division I Indoor Track and Field Championships	University of New Mexico	13th	Weight throw	20.05 m (65 ft 9 in)
2014	Big South Indoor Track and Field Championships	Virginia Tech University	1st	Hammer	20.31 m (66 ft 8 in)
2014	Big South Indoor Track and Field Championships	Virginia Tech University	17th	Shot put	12.92 m (42 ft 5 in)
2013	NCAA Division I Outdoor Track and Field East Prelims	North Carolina A&T State University	37th	Shot put	16.22 m (53 ft 3 in)
2013	NCAA Division I Outdoor Track and Field East Prelims	North Carolina A&T State University	42nd	Hammer	51.57 m (169 ft 2 in)
2013	Big South Outdoor Track and Field Championships	Liberty University	1st	Hammer	62.09 m (203 ft 8 in)
2013	Big South Outdoor Track and Field Championships	Liberty University	2nd	Shot put	16.71 m (54 ft 10 in)
2013	Big South Outdoor Track and Field Championships	Liberty University	5th	Discus	46.56 m (152 ft 9 in)
2013	Big South Indoor Track and Field Championships	JDL Fast Track	1st	Hammer	20.72 m (68 ft 0 in)
2013	Big South Indoor Track and Field Championships	JDL Fast Track	1st	Shot put	16.52 m (54 ft 2 in)

== Prep ==
Year	Competition	Venue	Position	Event	Notes
Lavergne High School
2012	TSSAA AAA Outdoor Track and Field Championships	Middle Tennessee State University	7th	Discus	45.90 m (150 ft 7 in)
2012	TSSAA AAA Outdoor Track and Field Championships	Middle Tennessee State University	1st	Shot put	17.28 m (56 ft 8 in)
2011	TSSAA AAA Outdoor Track and Field Championships	Middle Tennessee State University	3rd	Shot put	15.62 m (51 ft 3 in)
2010	TSSAA AAA Outdoor Track and Field Championships	Middle Tennessee State University	DNQ	Shot put	DNQ
