= Central Magnet School =

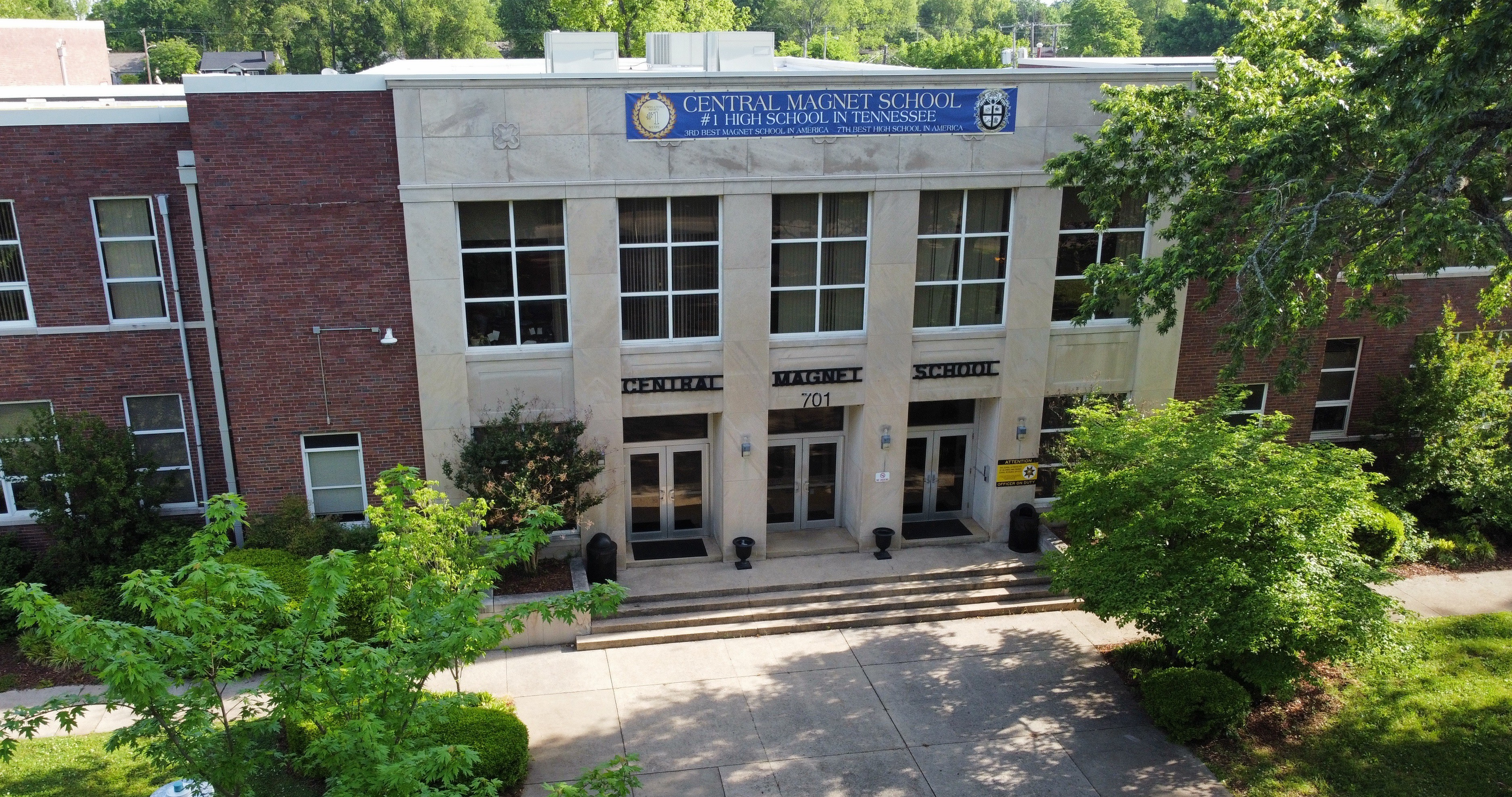
- Front aerial view of Central Magnet School in 2024

Location
- 701 East Main St; Murfreesboro, TN; United States; 35.8451°N 86.3784°W

Information
- Former name: Central High School
- Type: Public school, Magnet school
- Motto: Always my best
- Established: c. 2010
- School district: Rutherford County
- CEEB code: 431609
- Principal: Dr. Clark Blair
- Teaching staff: 71.70 (FTE)
- Grades: 6–12
- Enrollment: 1,222 (2025-2026)
- Student to teacher ratio: 16.88
- Colors: Gold; Black; White
- Athletics: TSSAA
- Nickname: Tigers
- Yearbook: The Gold Standard
- Website: central.rcschools.net

Central Magnet School is a public magnet school located in Murfreesboro, Tennessee. The school is a part of the Rutherford County school system and serves students from grades 6 through 12. In 2020, Central received the National Blue Ribbon School recognition for academic achievement.

== History ==
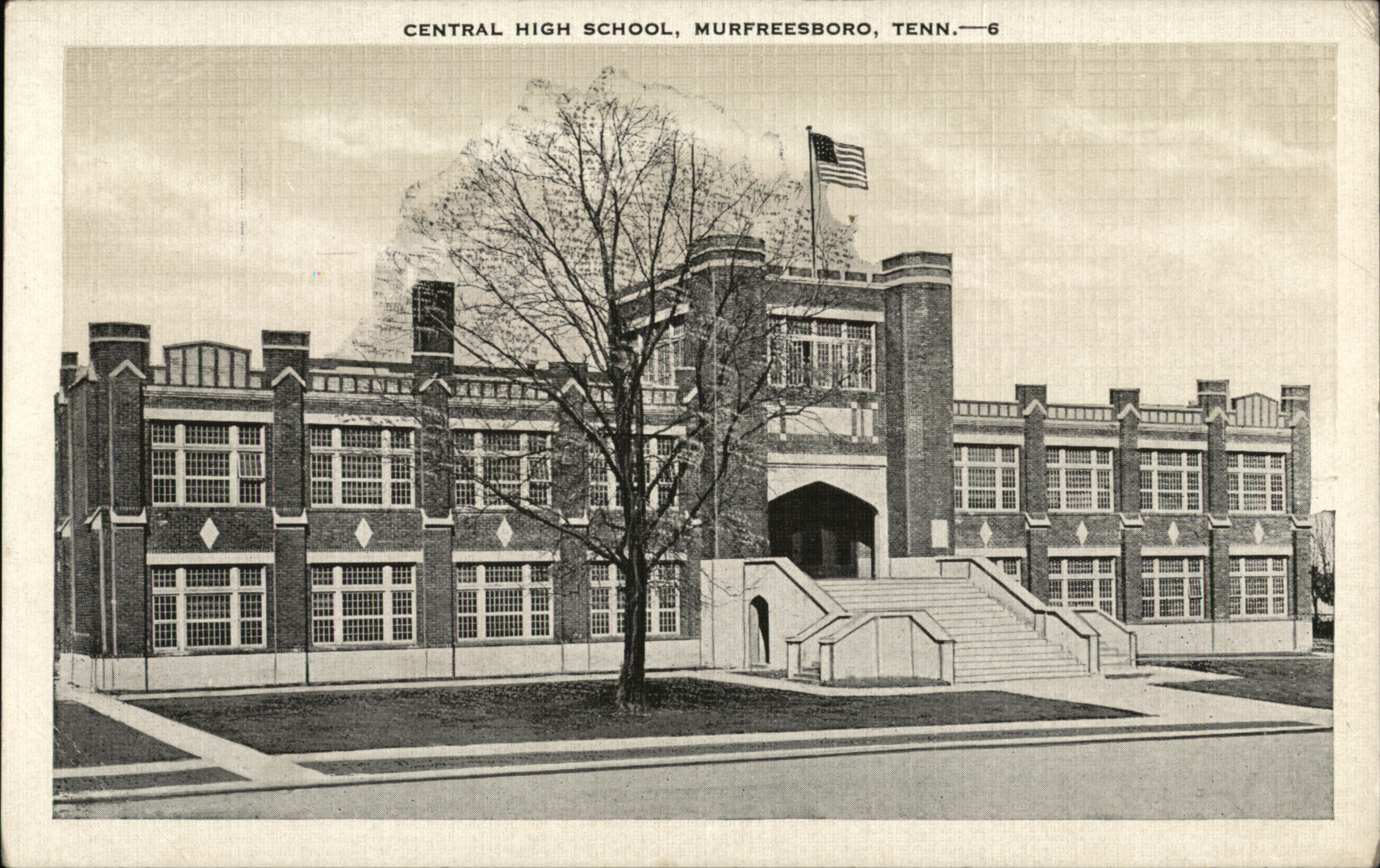
Central High School c. 1943

In the 1900s, Central Magnet was originally Central High School. The high school campus burned down in 1944 and was later rebuilt in 1950 to replace the Tennessee College for Women. Due to the large enrollment of students at Central High School, Rutherford County established Riverdale High School and Oakland High School. Central then became both a Middle and high magnet school in the fall of 2010.

== Academics ==
Central Magnet School is an academic magnet school, offering five dual enrollment options, 31 Advanced Placement courses, and 68 honors–or above honors–level courses. 100 percent of students participate in the AP program.

High school students must take four Advanced Placement courses, complete 25 hours of community service for each year of enrollment, and present a senior thesis in order to be eligible for the "Central Magnet Diploma".

In 2026, Central Magnet School was named "#1 Best High School in the Nation" by U.S. News High School Rankings.

== Clubs ==
- Aerospace Club
- Anime Club
- Architecture, Construction and Engineering Club
- Art Club
- Artificial Intelligence Club
- Asian Pacific Islander Student Organization
- Badminton Club
- Beads for Charity
- Beta Club
- Black Student Union
- Book Club
- Central Outdoors and Recreational Education Club
- Chess Team
- Creative Writing Club
- Crochet Club
- Cultural Awareness Club
- DECA
- Design Club
- Digital Art & Animation Club
- Dungeon and Dragons Club
- Fellowship of Christian Athletes
- Filmmaking Club
- First Priority
- Forensics
- Forestry Conservation Club
- French Club
- Gardening Club
- Gender Sexuality Alliance
- German Club
- German National Honor Society
- Girls Who Code
- GIS Club
- H.O.L.A. Spanish Club
- HOSA
- International Thespian Society Troupe
- Key Club
- La Table Française (French Round Table)
- Linguistics Club
- Medical Research Club
- Mental Health Club
- Mentor Club
- Mesa de Español (Spanish Round Table)
- Mock Trial
- Movie Circle
- Mu Alpha Theta
- Musical Theatre Club
- Mythology Club
- National English Honor Society
- National Honor Society
- National Junior Classical League
- National Spanish Honor Society
- Ocean and Lake Conservation Club
- Podcast Club
- Poetry Club
- Political Discourse Club
- Premiere League Fan Club
- Prom Committee
- Psi Alpha Psychology National Honor Society
- Psychology Club
- Radio Club
- Rho Kappa National Social Studies Honor Society
- Roman Life Club
- NASA Human Exploration Rover Challenge Club
- Science Bowl
- Science National Honor Society
- Science Olympiad
- Skateboarding Club
- Society of Women Engineers
- Songwriter's Club
- South Asian Youth Club
- Speech & Debate Club
- Spikeball Club
- STEM Outreach International
- Stock Exchange
- Student Council
- TEACH Club
- Tiger News Team
- Tri-M Music Honor Society
- Trivia Club
- TSA
- Untied Digital Media Club
- Ultimate Frisbee
- UNICEF
- Weightlifting Club
- Women in STEM
- Young Life
- Youth in Government
