= Trey Knox =

American football player (born 2001)

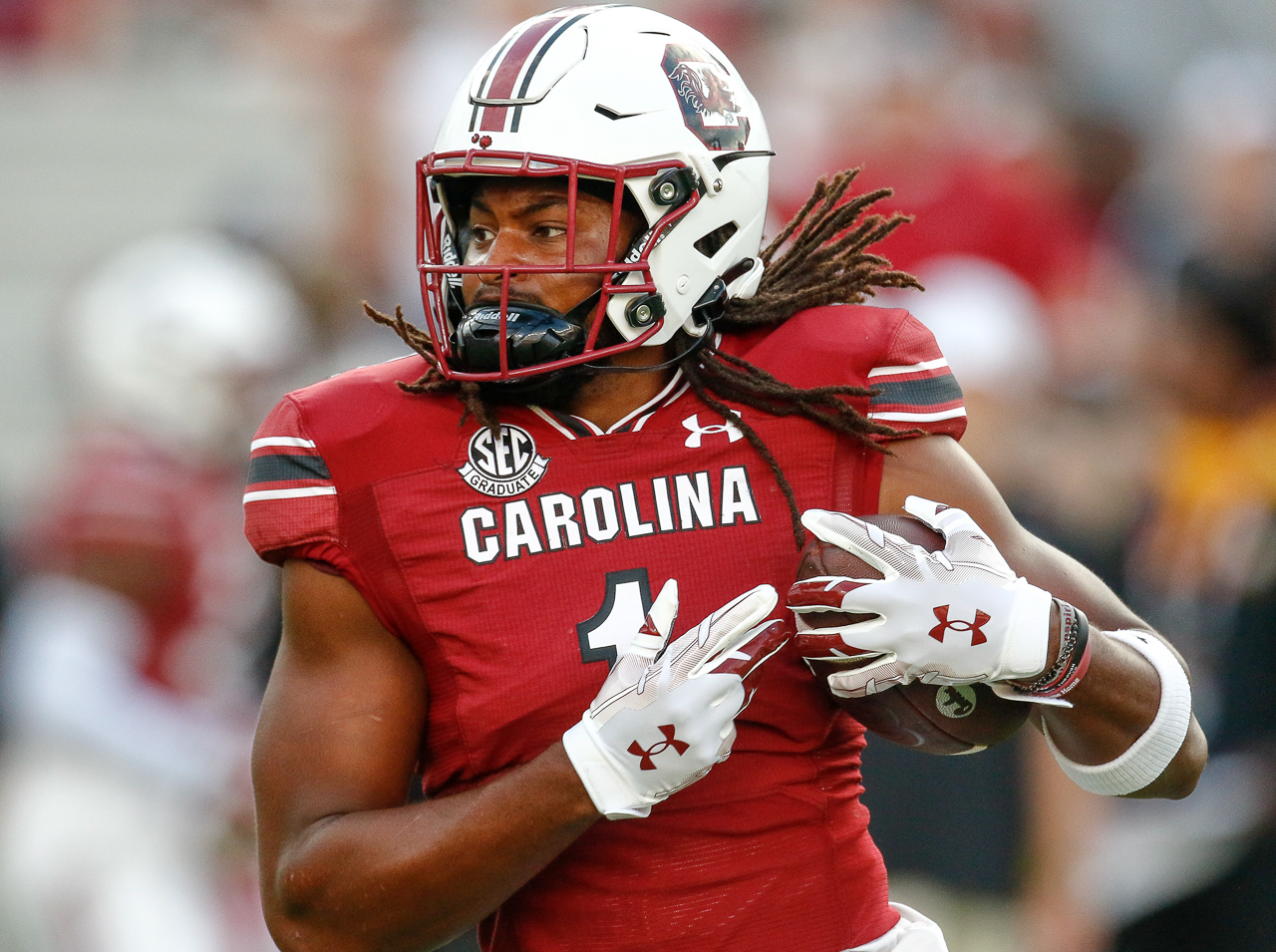
- Knox with the South Carolina Gamecocks in 2023

Profile
- Position: Tight end

Personal information
- Born: August 14, 2001 (age 25); Murfreesboro, Tennessee, U.S.
- Listed height: 6 ft 4 in (1.93 m)
- Listed weight: 240 lb (109 kg)

Career information
- High school: Blackman (Murfreesboro, Tennessee)
- College: Arkansas (2019–2022); South Carolina (2023)
- NFL draft: 2024: undrafted

Career history
- Minnesota Vikings (2024)*
- * Offseason or practice squad member only

Awards and highlights
- Second-team All-SEC (2023)

William L. "Trey" Knox III (born August 14, 2001) is an American football tight end. He played college football for the Arkansas Razorbacks and South Carolina Gamecocks.

== Early life ==
Knox attended Blackman High School in Murfreesboro, Tennessee, where he started three years at wide receiver and also played linebacker. He recorded 35 receptions for 558 yards and four touchdowns as a senior. Ranked a four-star recruit and a top-300 prospect nationally, he committed to play college football for the Arkansas Razorbacks.

== College career ==
Knox saw immediate playing time as a true freshman at Arkansas in 2019, totaling 28 catches for 385 yards along with three touchdowns while being named honorable mention All-Freshman by Pro Football Focus. He saw action in 10 games in the 2020 season, starting six, but made only seven receptions for 70 yards. He moved from wide receiver to tight end in 2021 and posted 20 receptions for 141 yards and a touchdown. The following year, he caught 26 passes for 296 yards and scored five touchdowns.

Knox entered the NCAA transfer portal and ultimately transferred to the South Carolina Gamecocks for his final season of college football in 2023. He played 10 games for the Gamecocks and totaled 37 receptions for 312 yards and two touchdowns. He was selected second-team All-Southeastern Conference (SEC) by the league's coaches. He was invited to the NFL Scouting Combine after the conclusion of his collegiate career.

== Professional career ==
Pre-draft measurables
Height	Weight	Arm length	Hand span	40-yard dash	10-yard split	20-yard split	20-yard shuttle	Three-cone drill	Vertical jump	Broad jump	Bench press
6 ft 3 in (1.91 m)	240 lb (109 kg)	34 1/4 in (0.87 m)	9 3/8 in (0.24 m)	4.91 s	1.70 s	2.78 s	4.47 s	7.09 s	34.0 in (0.86 m)	10 ft 1 in (3.07 m)	21 reps
All values from NFL Combine/Pro Day

Knox signed with the Minnesota Vikings as an undrafted free agent on April 27, 2024. He played in two preseason games, making one catch for 9 yards, and playing a total of 61 snaps. He was waived/injured on August 22. He received an injury settlement from the Vikings on September 2, 2024.
