= Rockvale High School =

Public high school in Rutherford County, Tennessee, United States

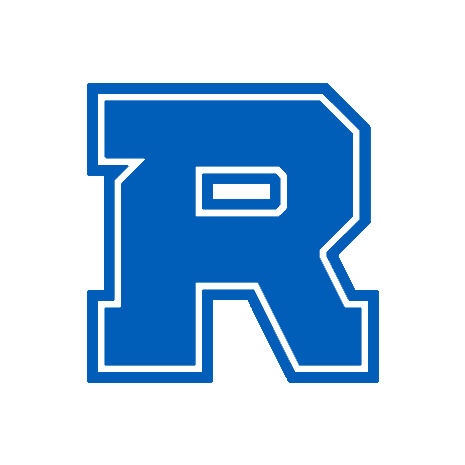

Location
- 6545 Highway 99; Rockvale, Tennessee; United States
- 35.7850°N 86.4975°W

Information
- Type: Public School
- Opened: 2019
- School district: Rutherford County
- CEEB code: 430021
- Principal: Steve Luker
- Teaching staff: 130.24 (FTE)
- Grades: 9-12
- Enrollment: 2,178 (2023-2024)
- Student to teacher ratio: 16.72
- Colors: Royal Blue; White; Grey
- Athletics: TSSAA
- Nickname: Rockets
- Website: rvh.rcschools.net

Rockvale High School is a public high school located in Rockvale, Tennessee near Murfreesboro in Rutherford County. It is located on State Route 99 (New Salem Highway) and opened in 2019. It is part of Rutherford County Schools. The $59 million contract for construction was signed in February 2017. It was named for the old Rockvale Community Consolidated School, which existed from 1927 to 1993, and the nickname is the Rockets, the mascot of the former school. As stated by the Tennessee State Report Card, the average ACT score was a 18.7, slightly below the state and district averages in every subject.

== Athletics ==
In their inaugural season, the Rockvale Women's Swim Team were the 2019-2020 MTHSSA Division III-B Champions. In their second football season, Rockvale won their first football game over Franklin County High School in 2020.

== Notable alumni ==
- Ja'Kobe Tharp (2023), track & field athlete, World Record Holder in the Men’s 110m Hurdles
