= Matt Weiss (American football) =

American football coach (born 1983)

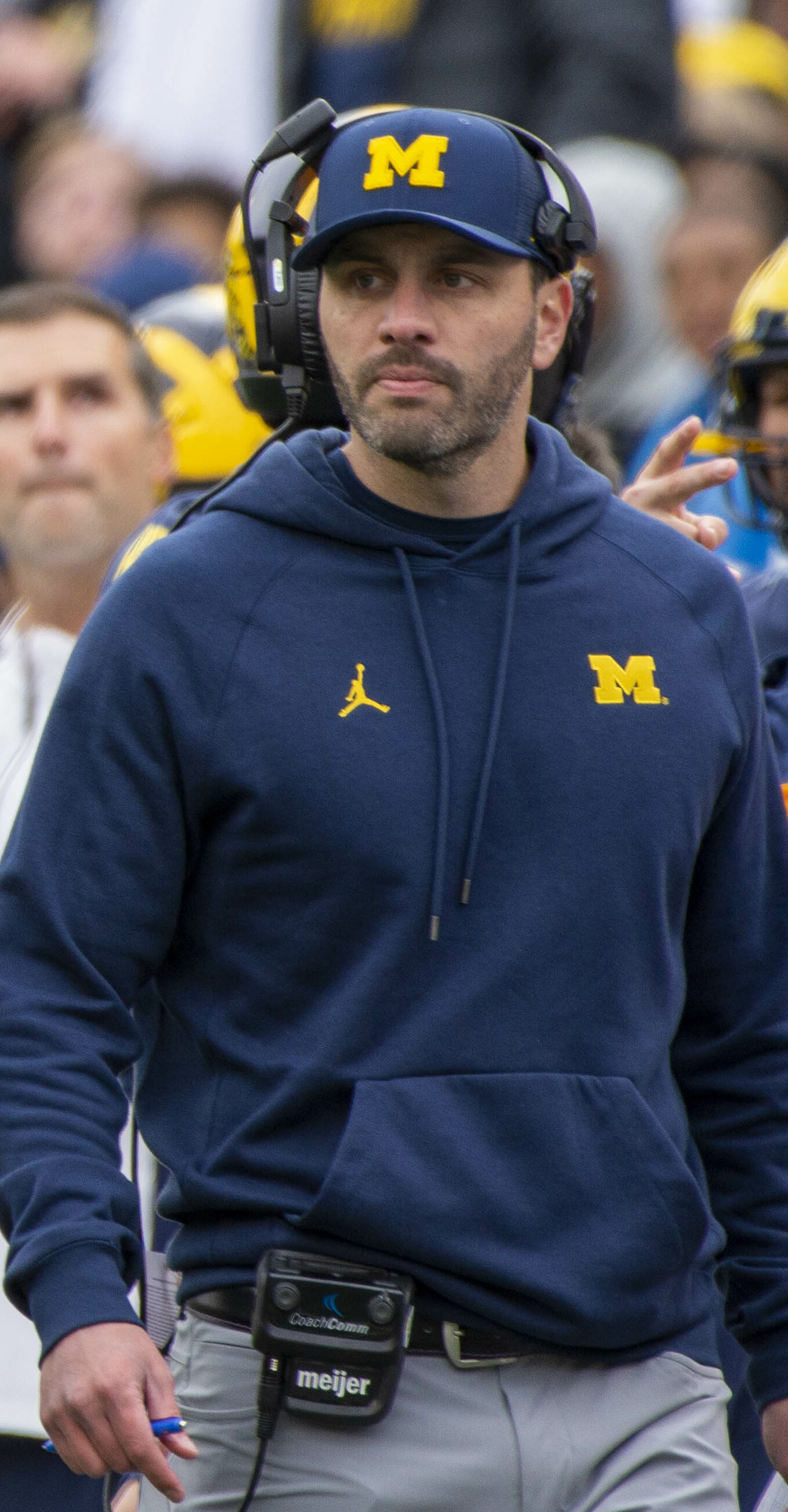
- Weiss with Michigan in 2021

Biographical details
- Born: March 1, 1983 (age 43); Cheshire, Connecticut, U.S.

Playing career
- 2001–2003: Vanderbilt
- Position: Punter

Coaching career (HC unless noted)

Football
- 2003–2004: Smyrna HS (TN) (assistant)
- 2005–2008: Stanford (GA)
- 2009–2011: Baltimore Ravens (HC asst.)
- 2012–2013: Baltimore Ravens (DQC)
- 2014: Baltimore Ravens (asst. LB / DQC)
- 2015: Baltimore Ravens (CB)
- 2016–2017: Baltimore Ravens (asst. QB)
- 2018: Baltimore Ravens (WR/FSC)
- 2019–2020: Baltimore Ravens (RB)
- 2021: Michigan (QB)
- 2022: Michigan (co-OC/QB)

Matthew Weiss (born March 1, 1983) is an American football coach. A native of Connecticut, he played college football for Vanderbilt and then served as a coach in multiple capacities for the Baltimore Ravens of the National Football League (NFL).

== Early years ==
Matt Weiss was born in Cheshire, Connecticut on March 1, 1983. He attended Hopkins School in Connecticut, where he graduated in 2001. He played baseball and football for his high school, where as the quarterback, he led his team to a 12–0 record, the first time this had been achieved at this school, as well as winning the school’s first New England Prep School Class C championship in 2001. Weiss then attended Vanderbilt University, where he earned a bachelor's degree in economics and human and organizational development. While working as a graduate assistant at Stanford he earned a master's degree in liberal arts in 2008.

== Collegiate playing career ==
A double major in English and economics, Weiss was a walk-on third string punter for the Vanderbilt Commodores from 2001 to 2003. However, Weiss never played in a game at Vanderbilt and was not included on the Sports Reference final roster in the years he attended the university.

== Coaching career ==
=== Smyrna High School (2003–2004) ===
Weiss was an assistant coach at Smyrna High School in 2003 and 2004, helping to introduce a tutoring program that supported student-athletes in gaining NCAA eligibility.

=== Stanford University (2005–2008) ===
Weiss was a graduate assistant at Stanford University from 2005 to 2008. He also was the defensive and special teams assistant in his final year at Stanford.

=== Baltimore Ravens (2009–2020) ===
Weiss was given an assistant coaching role for the Baltimore Ravens in 2009 under head coach John Harbaugh. He was then given the defensive quality coach role in 2012, a role in which he held until 2014 when Weiss became the line-backers coach. He also featured in the Raven's Super Bowl-winning team in Super Bowl XLVII, in which they defeated the San Francisco 49ers 34-31. Weiss was appointed the cornerback coach in 2015, then, in 2016 he became the assistant quarterback coach, and in 2018, Weiss became the assistant wide receiver and free safety coach. His final role with the Ravens was in 2019 when he was given the running back coach role, after the conclusion of the 2020/21 NFL season Weiss left the Ravens to become the Michigan quarterback’s coach.

==== Assistant to head coach ====
Weiss was hired by the Baltimore Ravens in 2009 as an assistant to head coach John Harbaugh. Weiss was part of the Ravens' coaching staff that won Super Bowl XLVII. In 2014, with Weiss as assistant linebackers coach, linebackers Terrell Suggs and Elvis Dumervil combined to be the NFL's top sack tandem with 29 sacks combined. Dumervil also broke the franchise record for sacks in this season with 17 as well as reached the Pro Bowl in the same season. Inside linebacker C. J. Mosley also became the first rookie in franchise history to be selected to the Pro Bowl. In 2015, with Weiss as cornerbacks coach, the Ravens' pass defense improved from 23rd the prior year (337.4 YPG) to 10th overall (233.6 YPG).

==== NFL rushing record in 2019 ====
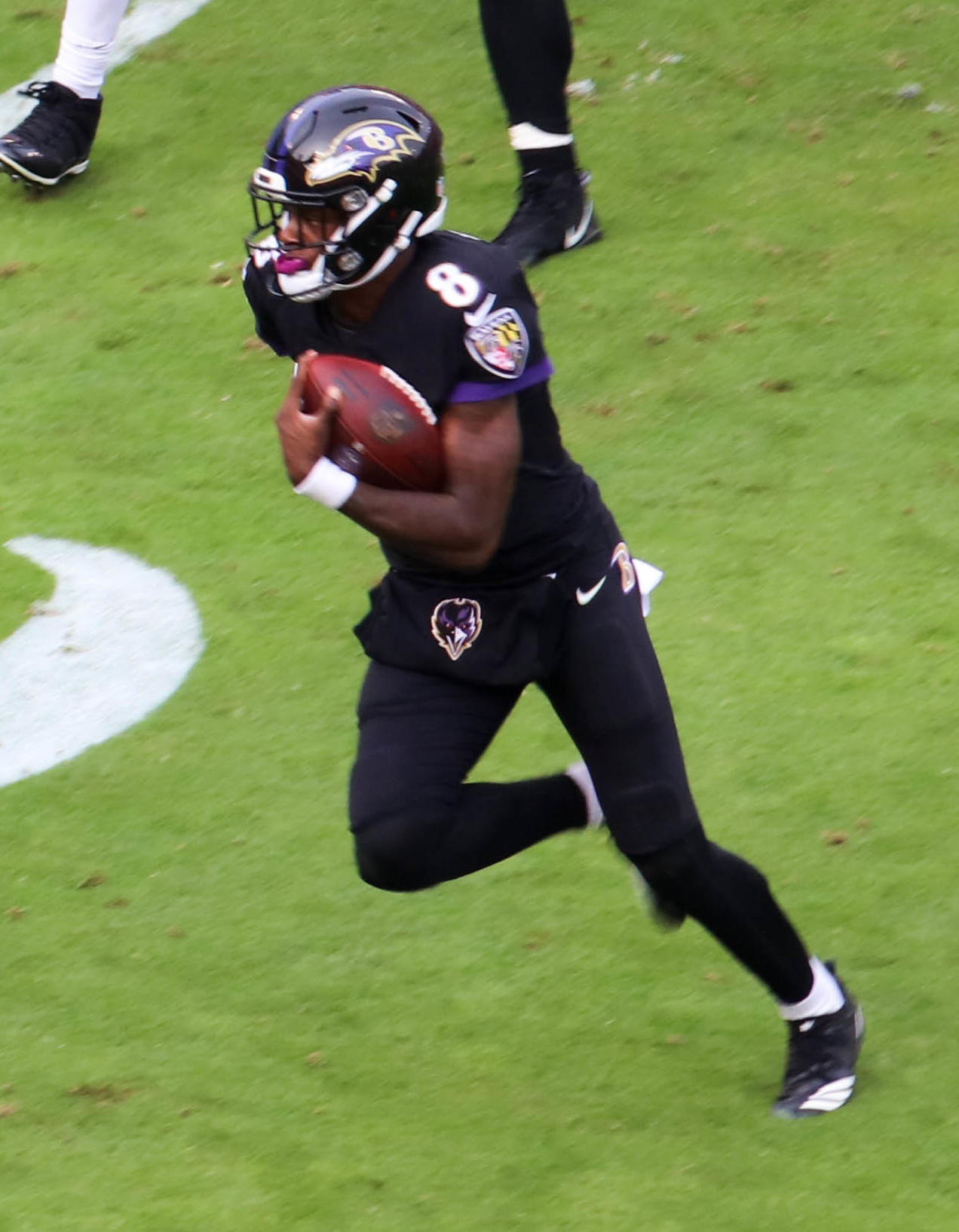
2019 NFL MVP, Lamar Jackson

Weiss was the running backs coach for the Baltimore Ravens in 2019, in this season the Baltimore Ravens broke the NFL’s single-season rushing yards total with 3,296, beating the previous record by the New England Patriots in 1978 of 3,165 yards. As well as two Ravens players featuring in the top five for yards per attempt, those being quarterback Lamar Jackson and running-back, Mark Ingram II. During that same season, running back Mark Ingram II averaged a career high 5.0 yards per carry, was selected to the Pro Bowl, and tied a franchise record with 15 touchdowns. Weiss aimed to minimise fumbles in order to maximise yards, with Lamar Jackson also breaking the record for most rushing yards by a quarterback in a single season as well as reducing his fumbles from ten to eight. This being important as a fumble provides the other team with the ball. With Lamar Jackson and Mark Ingram II becoming only the seventh pair of teammates to rush over 1000 yards in a season playing only 15 games out of the 16 possible. In 2020, running back J. K. Dobbins led all NFL running backs in yards per carry. Lamar Jackson was also the unanimous 2019 NFL MVP in that season.

==== Baltimore Ravens' 2020 COVID-19 outbreak ====
In Week 12 of 2020, the Baltimore Ravens had a COVID outbreak within the team. With Ravens personnel testing positive for 10 days straight, Weiss did not travel with the team for their game against the Pittsburgh Steelers. Over 16 Ravens players were placed on the COVID list, which at the time was a 10-day quarantine period, with star players such as quarterback Lamar Jackson featuring on this list. Weiss ultimately did not feature on the coaching staff for the Ravens in the Week 12 matchup against the Steelers due to illness.

=== University of Michigan (2021–2023) ===
Weiss left the Ravens following the 2020 season to join the Michigan Wolverines as their quarterbacks coach. Weiss reunited with former Stanford coach and John Harbaugh’s brother, Jim Harbaugh. Harbaugh stated he hired Weiss because he was looking at “what coaches would be the best fit for us [and the] best coach available.” According to author Pete DiPrimio, Weiss was joining a side that showed “offensive flaws” in 2019. In his first season with the team, the 2021 Wolverines won their first Big Ten championship since 2003. The Wolverines ultimately finished 12–2 after losing in the College Football Playoff semifinal Orange Bowl to the eventual champions, the Georgia Bulldogs. In his second season, the 2022 Wolverines won their first 13 games and repeated as Big Ten champions before losing in the College Football Playoff semifinal Fiesta Bowl to TCU.

In January 2023, Weiss was placed on leave during an investigation of computer access crimes by university police. On January 20, 2023, Weiss was fired.

== Personal life ==
Weiss and his wife, Melissa, have a son, and two daughters.

On March 20, 2025, Weiss was indicted on 24 federal charges, 14 counts of unauthorized access to computers and 10 counts of aggravated identity theft by the U.S. Attorney's office for the Eastern District of Michigan. Federal authorities allege that Weiss obtained unauthorized access to the student-athlete databases of over 100 schools as well as the social media, email, and/or cloud storage accounts of more than 2,000 individual student athletes that he targeted.
