= Montori Hughes =

American football player (born 1990)

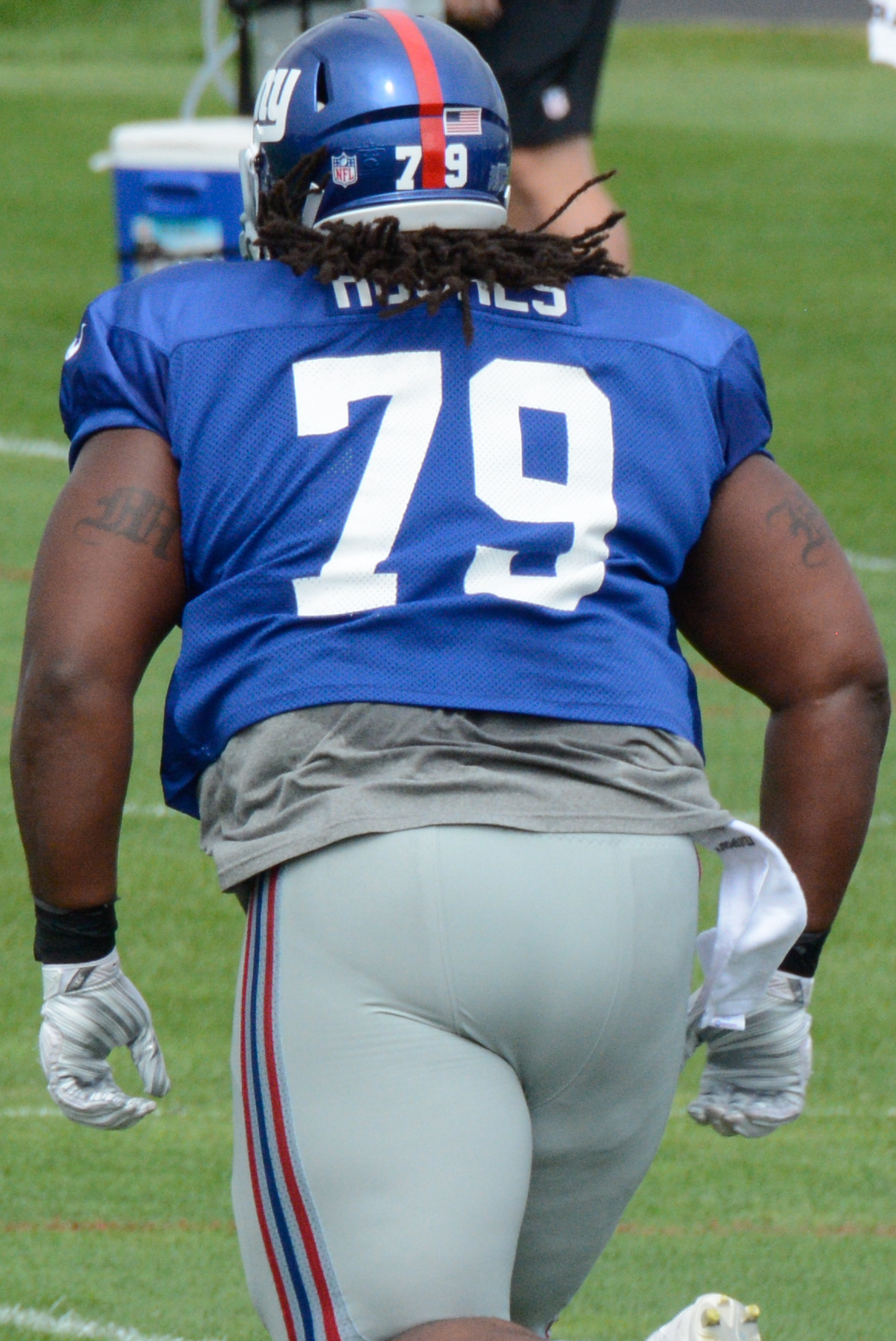
- Hughes with the New York Giants in 2016

No. 94, 95, 79, 97
- Position: Defensive tackle

Personal information
- Born: August 25, 1990 (age 36); Murfreesboro, Tennessee, U.S.
- Listed height: 6 ft 4 in (1.93 m)
- Listed weight: 350 lb (159 kg)

Career information
- High school: Siegel (Murfreesboro)
- College: UT Martin
- NFL draft: 2013: 5th round, 139th overall pick

Career history
- Indianapolis Colts (2013–2014); New York Giants (2015–2016); Kansas City Chiefs (2017)*; Washington Redskins (2018)*; Memphis Express (2019); Los Angeles Wildcats (2020)
- * Offseason or practice squad member only

Awards and highlights
- First-team All-OVC (2012)

Career NFL statistics
- Games played: 25
- Games started: 1
- Total tackles: 23
- Fumble recoveries: 1
- Stats at Pro Football Reference

Montori Hughes (born August 25, 1990) is an American former professional football player who was a defensive tackle in the National Football League (NFL). He played college football for the UT Martin Skyhawks and was selected by the Indianapolis Colts in the fifth round of the 2013 NFL draft. He was also a member of the New York Giants, Kansas City Chiefs, Washington Redskins, Memphis Express, and Los Angeles Wildcats.

== Early life ==
Hughes was born in Murfreesboro, Tennessee. He attended Siegel High School in Murfreesboro, where he was a three-year starter and led the Siegel Stars high school football team in tackles with 106, tackles-for-loss with 25 and sacks with 13 as a senior in 2007. He was named the Region 4-5A Defensive MVP, all-region, all-area and all-county and participated in the Toyota East-West All-Star Classic in 2007. Also starring in basketball, Hughes averaged double figures in scoring and rebounding for Siegel High School.

Rated only a two-star recruit by Rivals.com, Hughes was not ranked among the best defensive tackle prospects in the nation. Scout.com, which listed Hughes as a three-star recruit, ranked him as No. 49 overall defensive tackle in the 2008 class. Jamie Newberg of Scout.com later admitted that recruiting services overlooked Hughes: "Right now, to me, he may be the best prospect in the state when it's all said and done. And we just flat missed him."

Hughes had scholarship offers from Jacksonville State and Tennessee State, but committed to Tennessee after head coach Phillip Fulmer offered him a scholarship. Fulmer compared Hughes to former Vols defensive tackle Justin Harrell, who transformed from a little-known recruit to a first-round pick in the 2007 NFL draft.

== College career ==
Hughes originally signed with the University of Tennessee in January 2008, but failed to qualify academically. He spent several months at Fork Union Military Academy in Virginia, before enrolling at Tennessee in January 2009. Hughes had bulked up from 275 to 310 pounds in little over a year, and emerged as one of the Tennessee Volunteers football team's most talented defensive freshman. He was expected to play in Tennessee's 2011 season opener; however, Hughes was dismissed from the team on June 9, 2011, by head coach Derek Dooley.

Hughes subsequently transferred to the University of Tennessee at Martin, and played for the UT Martin Skyhawks football team in 2011 and 2012.

== Professional career ==
Pre-draft measurables
Height	Weight	Arm length	Hand span	40-yard dash	20-yard shuttle	Three-cone drill	Vertical jump	Broad jump	Bench press
6 ft 4 in (1.93 m)	329 lb (149 kg)	32 5/8 in (0.83 m)	10 1/8 in (0.26 m)	5.23 s	4.70 s	7.85 s	26 1/2 in (0.67 m)	8 ft 8 in (2.64 m)	22 reps
All values from NFL Combine

=== Indianapolis Colts ===
Hughes was selected by the Indianapolis Colts in the fifth round of the 2013 NFL draft. On September 5, 2015, Hughes was waived by the Colts.

=== New York Giants ===
On September 7, 2015, Hughes was signed to the New York Giants' practice squad. On November 10, 2015, he was elevated to the active roster.

On September 4, 2016, Hughes was released by the Giants. On September 13, 2016, Hughes was re-signed by the Giants. He was released on October 11, 2016.

=== Kansas City Chiefs ===
On January 31, 2017, Hughes signed a reserve/future contract with the Chiefs. He was released on August 4, 2017.

=== Washington Redskins ===
On January 3, 2018, Hughes signed a reserve/future contract with the Washington Redskins. He was released on April 30, 2018.

=== Memphis Express ===
In 2019, Hughes joined the Memphis Express of the Alliance of American Football. The league ceased operations in April 2019.

=== Los Angeles Wildcats ===
Hughes was selected by the Los Angeles Wildcats during the 2020 XFL Supplemental Draft held on November 22, 2019. He signed with the team during mini-camp in December 2019. He was waived on February 15, 2020.
