= Stewarts Creek High School =

Location
- Smyrna, Tennessee; United States; 35.9285°N 86.56°W

Information
- Type: Public High School
- Established: 2013
- School district: Rutherford County Schools (Tennessee)
- Principal: Dr. Clark Harrell
- Staff: 127.80 (FTE)
- Enrollment: 2,237 (2018-19)
- Student to teacher ratio: 17.50
- Colors: Red, Black, White
- Mascot: Red Hawk
- Yearbook: The Talon
- Website: www.sch.rcschools.net

Stewarts Creek High School is a public high school in the Rutherford County School system, located in Smyrna, Tennessee. The school opened in August 2013 with an estimate of 1500 students: 600 freshmen, around 300 sophomores and around 150 juniors and seniors. As of August 2021, SCHS currently has an enrollment of over 2,300. The school is located in southwest Smyrna, Tennessee. The students of the school come from surrounding Smyrna, LaVergne and Blackman high/middle schools as well as Rock Springs Middle School and Stewarts Creek Middle School. The current principal is Clark Harrell. The $46.3 million facility stands at an outstanding 356,000 sq. ft. sq. and is the second largest school in Middle Tennessee. The school holds one of the best fine arts programs in Middle Tennessee. This school is considered one of the best schools in Rutherford County.

== Athletics ==
The school opened with 18 varsity teams which include football, boys and girls basketball, boys and girls soccer, volleyball, softball, baseball, ice hockey, bowling, swimming, wrestling, golf, and JROTC raiders.
