= Smyrna High School (Tennessee) =

Public school in Tennessee, United States

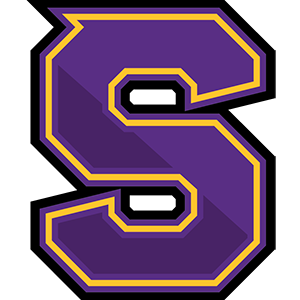

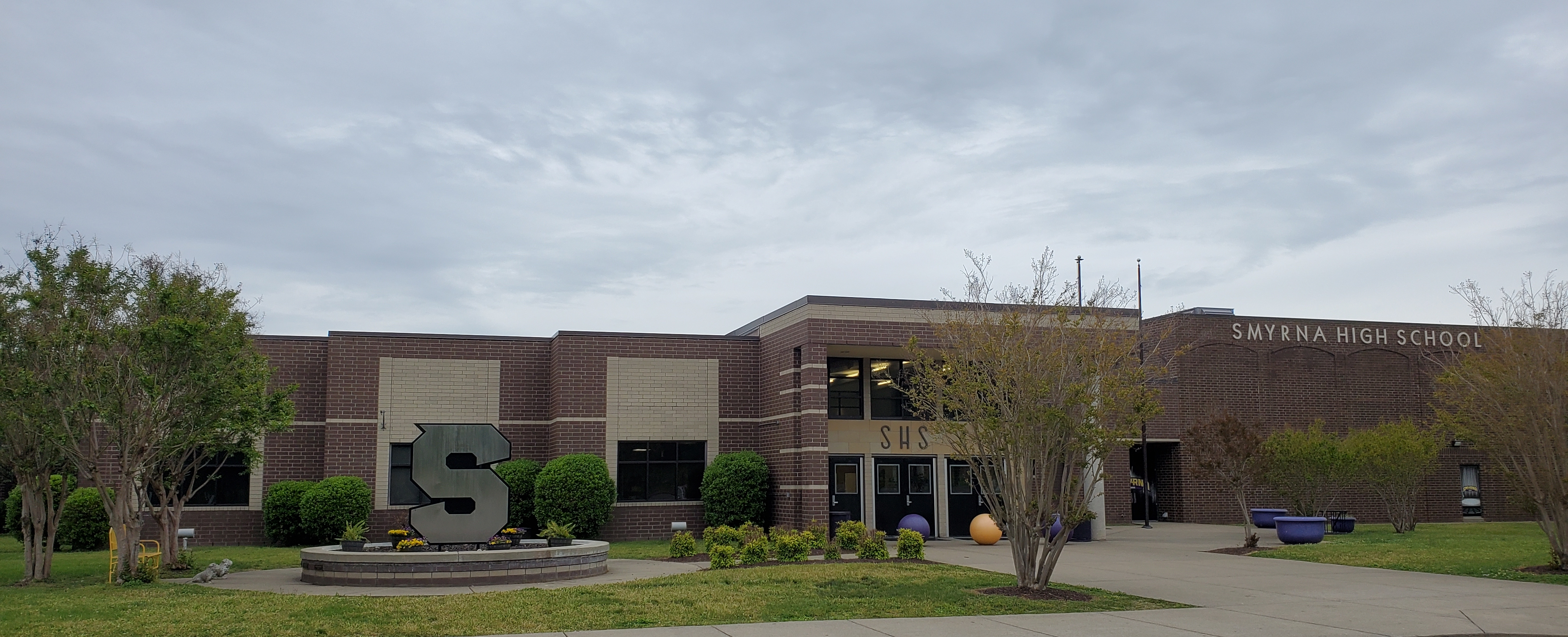

Location
- 100 Bulldog Drive; Smyrna, Tennessee; United States; 35.9594°N 86.5075°W

Information
- Type: Public School, Cambridge International
- Motto: Striving for Excellence
- Established: 1919
- School district: Rutherford County
- CEEB code: 432130
- Principal: Sherri Southerland
- Teaching staff: 134.91 (on an FTE basis)
- Grades: 9—12
- Enrollment: 2,254 (2023—2024)
- Student to teacher ratio: 16.71
- Colors: Purple; Gold
- Athletics: TSSAA
- Nickname: Bulldog
- Yearbook: Gold Dust
- Website: shs.rcschools.net

Smyrna High School is a high school in the Rutherford County school district located in Smyrna, Tennessee, United States.

== History ==
Smyrna High was founded in 1919. In 1988, it was split into the current La Vergne High School and Smyrna High School in order to provide adequate room for student enrollment. In 2000, Smyrna went through yet another split with the building of Blackman High School. The current Smyrna Middle School building was the previous home of Smyrna High. In June 2011, Robert Raikes retired as principal of Smyrna High School after 37 years at the position, and over 50 years of being with the school. His replacement was named a month later when Rick Powell, a longtime assistant principal at Smyrna, was promoted to head principal. In May 2018, Dr. Sherri Southerland was announced as Powell's replacement after his retirement.

== Academics ==
Smyrna High offers AP and Bethel classes. The school offers specialized elective focuses in many areas:

- Architecture & Construction
- Audio and Visual Production
- Banking & Finance
- Business Management
- Criminal Justice
- Culinary Arts
- Design Communications
- Horticulture Science
- Interior Design
- JROTC I-IV
- MEP Systems
- Marketing Management
- Sport & Human Performance
- Teaching as a Profession
- Technology
- Therapeutic Services
- Veterinary & Animal Science

== Athletics ==
Smyrna High is a former TSSAA state champion in football (2006 and 2007), girls' basketball (1961 and 1982), softball (2013), girls' bowling (2013), and boys' bowling (2005, 2006, 2009, 2011 and 2018).

== Notable alumnus ==
- Arion Carter, college football linebacker for the Tennessee Volunteers
- Sonny Gray, Major League Baseball pitcher
- Michael Hicks, Poland men's national 3x3 team
