= Matt Weiss (soccer) =

American soccer player

Personal information
- Date of birth: October 21, 1952 (age 74)
- Place of birth: St. Louis, Missouri, United States
- Position: Goalkeeper

Youth career
- 1971–1974: Quincy University

Senior career*
Years	Team	Apps	(Gls)
1975–1976	Dallas Tornado	14	(0)
- * Club domestic league appearances and goals

Matt Weiss is a retired American soccer goalkeeper who played two seasons with the Dallas Tornado in the North American Soccer League.

Weiss attended Quincy University, playing on the school's soccer team from 1971 to 1974. During his four seasons with the team, Quincy won the 1971, 1973 and 1974 NAIA national men's soccer championship. In 2005, Quincy inducted Weiss into its Athletic Hall of Fame.
