= La Vergne High School =

Location
- 250 Wolverine Trail; LaVergne, Tennessee 37086; United States; 35.989°N 86.5603°W

Information
- Type: Public High School
- Motto: Integrity. Pride. Perseverance. Honor.
- Established: 1988
- School district: Rutherford County Schools
- CEEB code: 431162
- Principal: Theowauna Hatchett
- Faculty: 130.07 (on FTE basis)
- Grades: 9–12
- Enrollment: 2,116 (2024–2025)
- Student to teacher ratio: 16.26
- Colors: Royal blue and silver
- Team name: Wolverines
- Website: lhs.rcschools.net

La Vergne High School is a public high school located in La Vergne, Tennessee, United States, with approximately 1,723 students. It was founded in 1988 and a part of the Rutherford County School System.

As of 2020, the school principal is Dr. Theowauna Hatchett. The current assistant principals are William Jones, Dale Hudson, Lisa Fitzcharles, Deidra Barnes and Hope Bakari

== History ==
La Vergne High School opened in 1988 in response to the population explosion in North Rutherford County. Smyrna High School had been the only high school serving this area for approximately 40 years, and its overcrowding was the catalyst leading to the building of two new high schools: the new Smyrna High School next to Lee Victory Pkwy, and La Vergne High School on Wolverine Trail.

== Athletics ==
Sisters Keysha and Kylah Martin both qualified for the TSAA Division I Individual State Bowling Tournament in 2012 representing Rutherford County. By the end of the tournament, Keysha took the title and became the first female in Rutherford County to ever win the title. La Vergne is also the winner of the county track meet for 15 straight years and has been represented in the state track meet since 1994.

== Extracurricular activities ==
The school's marching band has compiled a record of success in regional and national school band competitions. The band is under the direction of Rontrell Callahan and Nicholas Alexander. In the 2007-2008 school year, the La Vergne Band received many awards at USSBA competitions in the Southeast Region, as well as receiving the award for 8th place overall band in the nation at the 2007 USSBA Grand National Championships in Baltimore, Maryland with the marching show Wicked. The Percussion Section received 5th overall and the Color Guard was 11th overall. Their 2010-2011 school year also received high notation, as they were invited to the 2010 USSBA grand national championships in Annapolis, Maryland on November 6, with their show Kyoudai. Overall in 9th place, with music and visuals getting 8th place, percussion receiving 2nd place, and color guard getting 12th place out of the 100 bands performing. With a score of 93.813 out of 100, this made La Vergne state champions. The La Vergne High School percussion is highly respected in the community for their dedication and effort put towards their program.

The school's Choral Department has a total of six choirs and ensembles (under the direction of Carl Keating): Freshman Choir, Concert Choir, Cantores Celestis, Rockafellas, Tri-M and The Choraliers. The Freshman choir was established for the 2012-2013 school year. Choraliers has received many excellent and superior ratings. Cantores Celestis, The Rockafellas, and The Choraliers are all audition-based choirs. Cantores Celestis, The Concert Choir, and The Choraliers have all received superior in every county or state festival. The Choraliers have been to regional festivals in Atlanta, Georgia, St. Louis, Missouri and Disney World, Orlando, Florida, and they were also the 1st school to be in state festival in Knoxville, Tennessee since the school is in Middle Tennessee. They have been accepted to go again in April 2013. Tri-M is the music departments Honor Music Society ensemble, including students with a grade point average of 3.0 or higher.

== Alma Mater ==
"There she sits upon the hillside. See her banner fly, as the colors blue and silver flash across the sky. Wolverines will stand together; strive to never fail. Here's to you our alma mater. Cheer La Vergne ALL HAIL!!!"

== Controversy ==
La Vergne High was in a dispute with the county over an assembly to which only black, Asian, and Hispanic students were invited at which former Principal Melvin Daniels criticized test scores by ethnicity, and the local NAACP chapter has filed a complaint. In a separate incident, the former principal Melvin Daniels, who is black, alleged that he was passed over for promotion, and received a $57,000 settlement from the county.

== Notable alumni ==
- Quinton Patton – former NFL wide receiver
- Robert Myers – former NFL offensive lineman
- Alex Young – hammer throw athlete
