= Siegel High School =

Public high school in Murfreesboro, Tennessee

Location
- 3300 Siegel Road; Murfreesboro, Tennessee; United States; 35.9077°N 86.4008°W

Information
- Type: Public
- Established: 2003
- School district: Rutherford County Schools
- Principal: Stephen Wayne
- Teaching staff: 121.24 (on FTE basis)
- Grades: 9 to 12
- Enrollment: 1,873 (2023-2024)
- Student to teacher ratio: 15.45
- Colors: Navy; Teal; Silver
- Athletics conference: TSSAA
- Mascot: Stars
- Nickname: Siegel Nation
- Website: Siegel High School

Siegel High School is a public high school in the Rutherford County School System in Tennessee. The principal, Stephen Wayne, has been the head of the administrative staff since 2026.

Siegel High School opened in the fall of 2003. The Siegel school complex also includes Siegel Middle School and Erma Siegel Elementary school. The complex is situated on land gifted to Rutherford County by Richard Siegel through his will.

== Football ==
The Stars football team plays at Ken Nolan Stadium, named after the first principal of the school. The team has had many players play football at the next level, including one NFL Draft Pick (Montori Hughes).

Accomplishments

- 2012 District 7AAA champions
- 2012 perfect regular season (10–0)

== Wrestling ==
The Stars wrestling team competes in District 10 - Region 5 of the Tennessee Secondary School Athletic Association. The team has had numerous Region Champions, State Medalist, and one State Champion. The Stars also claimed back to back District titles in 2015 and 2016 while winning the Region 5 Dual Championship in 2015.

== Notable alumni ==
- Montori Hughes, former NFL defensive tackle
- Ken Roberts, former MLB baseball pitcher
- Brent Stockstill, former professional football player and current defensive assistant for the Indianapolis Colts
