= Riverdale High School (Tennessee) =

Public high school in Tennessee, United States

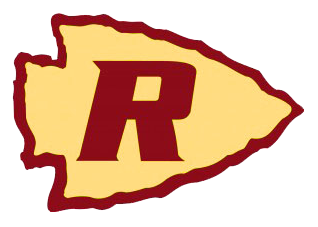

Location
- 802 Warrior Drive; Murfreesboro, Tennessee 37128; United States; 35°48′57.07″N 86°24′34.2″W

Information
- School type: High school
- Founded: c. 1972; 54 years ago
- School district: Rutherford County
- CEEB code: 431622
- Principal: Tamera Blair
- Teaching staff: 174.96 (FTE)
- Grades: 9–12
- Enrollment: 2,124 (2023–2024)
- Student to teacher ratio: 12.12
- Colors: Vegas gold; Cardinal red
- Nickname: Warriors, Lady Warriors
- Newspaper: Smoke Signal
- Yearbook: Lance & Shield
- Website: rhs.rcschools.net

Riverdale High School is a public high school operated by the Rutherford County School system located in the southwestern part of Murfreesboro, Tennessee. It is on Warrior Drive which intersects with South Church Street (US 231 South). Riverdale is one of the older high schools in Murfreesboro, along with Oakland High School which was also built in 1972. These schools were constructed to replace the outdated former Murfreesboro Central High School, which was then converted to a junior high school (later middle school) facility. It is home to 12 academic departments, 40 extracurricular clubs, and 19 TSSAA athletic teams.

== Academics ==
In 2014, Riverdale High School ranked better than 21.3% of high schools in Tennessee. It also ranked second among high schools in the large Rutherford County School District.

== Campus ==
Along with Oakland High School (Tennessee), the sprawling campus includes two main academic buildings containing computer labs, science labs, an auditorium, a band room, two cafeterias, and many classrooms. The freshmen have a dedicated building known as the Annex. The fieldhouse features a full-size basketball court, a wrestling room, workout areas, locker rooms, and coaching offices. The spacious site also has softball, baseball, soccer, and football fields, and a swimming pool.

== Band program ==
The Riverdale High School Band was established in 1972. It has a wind ensemble, a symphonic band, a concert band, a marching band (participation mandatory for all band students), percussion ensembles, a jazz band, and student-led chamber ensembles.

== Choir ==
Students can choose General Music or one of Riverdale's three Choirs to earn their Fine Arts Credit. The Women's and Men's Chorales offer an excellent vocal education to all students, while the prestigious and historic Riverdale Singers requires an audition with high-performance expectations.

== National Art Honors Society ==
NAHS is a nationally recognized program designed to support and encourage students who demonstrate interest and skills in the visual arts. NAHS provides opportunities for scholarships and national recognition with 48,000 art students worldwide. Students at Riverdale that are active members are working on building character while performing community and school-wide service. Projects include:

- Rutherford County Quilt Trail
- Volunteer Face Painting for Discovery Center and John Coleman fall festival
- Painting and creating for teachers who need visual props
- Murals for beautification of Riverdale

== School newspaper and yearbook ==
The Smoke Signal is Riverdale High School's online newspaper. Six staff members provide the writing, photography, and website updates necessary to keep the newspaper up to date. These writers are part of a larger creative writing class but are dedicated to journalistic writing only and their focus is the Smoke Signal. During the fall homecoming festival, the newspaper offers a photo booth as a fundraising event to help keep cameras and software updated.

The Riverdale High School yearbook, Lance & Shield, is a 360-page history book published every year by a staff of students who work both in and out of class to create the book. Students provide much of the candid photography used in the book and write all of the copy and captions. To help offset the price of yearbooks, members of the staff solicit local businesses for ads and offer senior congratulatory ads to parents. The staff organizes and runs both the fall and spring photo days, as well as the club picture day in October.

== Notable alumni ==
- Ronnie Alsup (1955–2014), American paralympic athlete and standing volleyball player
- Fernando Bryant (born 1977), American football player
- Dennis Harrison (born 1956), American football player
- Elijah Herring (born 2003), American football player
- Carson Tinker (born 1989), American football player
- Jessi Alexander (born 1976), songwriter
