= La Vergne, Tennessee =

- City
- Seal
- Motto(s): Honoring our past, building our future
- Location of La Vergne in Rutherford County, Tennessee
- Coordinates: 36°0′56″N 86°34′55″W
- Country: United States
- State: Tennessee
- County: Rutherford
- Settled: 1852
- Original Incorporation: 1860
- Reincorporated: 1972

Government
  - Type: Mayor-Council
  - Mayor: Jason Cole
  - Vice mayor: Steve Noe
  - Alderman: List: Carol Haas; Kara Hobbs; Dennis Waldron

Area
  - Total: 24.95 sq mi (64.63 km^{2})
  - Land: 24.71 sq mi (64.01 km^{2})
  - Water: 0.24 sq mi (0.62 km^{2}) 1.20%
- Elevation: 584 ft (178 m)

Population
  - Estimate (2024): 41,430
  - Density: 1,566.6/sq mi (604.88/km^{2})
- Time zone: UTC-6 (CST)
  - Summer (DST): UTC-5 (CDT)
- ZIP code: 37086
- Area code: 615
- FIPS code: 47-41200
- GNIS feature ID: 1290433
- Website: www.lavergnetn.gov

La Vergne (/ləˈvɜːrn/ lə-VURN) is a city in Rutherford County, Tennessee, United States. The population was 38,719 at the 2020 census, and was estimated at 41,430 in 2024 by the United States Census Bureau. La Vergne lies within the Nashville Metropolitan Statistical Area.

== History ==
Before Euro-American settlement, the land that became Rutherford County was used as seasonal hunting and fishing ground by Cherokee, Chickasaw, Shawnee, Creek, and Choctaw peoples until 1794. Early maps show the Nickajack Trail and Creek War Trace converging near present-day Murfreesboro, southeast of La Vergne.

The area that became La Vergne was first settled by Euro-American settlers in the late 18th century and was initially associated with the Hurricane Creek and Stones River waterways. Early settlement names included Buchanan land and Buchananville; James B. Buchanan was named postmaster at Buchananville in 1837.

The city's name is associated with François Lenard Gregoire de Roulhac de La Vergne, a French-born physician who later used the anglicized name Francis Roulhac. According to the city, the post office was named La Vergne on the day of Roulhac's death in 1852. Historical variant names include Laveren and Lavergne.

City records date La Vergne's original incorporation to February 28, 1860. During the American Civil War, the city was the site of skirmishes preceding the Second Battle of Murfreesboro in 1862, and much of the community was burned that year. Its incorporation was rescinded in 1881, after the city had not elected officials following the war and lacked enough adults to organize a board and town constitution.

Modern municipal government dates to 1972, when La Vergne was incorporated again and elected a city council. Vester Waldron served as the first mayor after reincorporation. Firestone, later Bridgestone, opened a plant in the city in 1971, and the city held its first Old Timers Day in 1972. La Vergne and La Vergne, France became sister cities in 1982.

== Geography ==
La Vergne is located in northern Rutherford County southeast of Nashville. It directly borders the Antioch neighborhood of Nashville on the northwest, Smyrna on the southeast, and Percy Priest Lake on the northeast. Interstate 24 and U.S. routes 41 and 70S pass through the community. The Percy Priest Reservoir on the Stones River lies to the north of the community.

La Vergne's location near Percy Priest Lake gives the city access to boating, fishing, camping, and other outdoor recreation. City visitor information lists boat launches at Hurricane Creek and Poole Knobs Recreation Area, as well as camping at Poole Knobs.

According to the United States Census Bureau, the city has a total area of 25.1 square miles (65 km^{2}), of which 24.8 square miles (64 km^{2}) is land and 0.3 square miles (0.78 km^{2}) (1.20%) is water.

== Demographics ==
Historical population
Census	Pop.	Note	%±
1930	183		—
1980	5,495		—
1990	7,499		36.5%
2000	18,687		149.2%
2010	32,588		74.4%
2020	38,719		18.8%
2025 (est.)	42,146	▲	8.9%
U.S. Decennial Census; 2018 Estimate

=== 2020 census ===
As of the 2020 census, La Vergne had a population of 38,719, 12,472 households, and 8,673 families residing in the city.

The median age was 32.7 years, with 29.5% of residents under the age of 18 and 7.6% aged 65 years or older; for every 100 females there were 95.9 males, and for every 100 females age 18 and over there were 93.0 males.

Of the 12,472 households, 46.0% had children under the age of 18 living in them, 49.7% were married-couple households, 15.6% had a male householder with no spouse or partner present, 26.0% had a female householder with no spouse or partner present, 16.3% were made up of individuals, and 4.3% had someone living alone who was 65 years of age or older.

As of the 2020 census, 95.3% of residents lived in urban areas, while 4.7% lived in rural areas.

There were 12,890 housing units, of which 3.2% were vacant; the homeowner vacancy rate was 1.0% and the rental vacancy rate was 4.6%.

Racial composition as of the 2020 census
Race	Number	Percent
White	17,766	45.9%
Black or African American	9,816	25.4%
American Indian and Alaska Native	335	0.9%
Asian	1,440	3.7%
Native Hawaiian and Other Pacific Islander	40	0.1%
Some other race	5,374	13.9%
Two or more races	3,948	10.2%
Hispanic or Latino (of any race)	9,427	24.3%

The Census Bureau estimated La Vergne's population at 41,430 in 2024, a 7.0% increase from its 2020 population estimate base. The city is racially and ethnically diverse: in 2024 Census estimates, 48.2% of residents were White alone, 27.0% were Black alone, 13.0% identified as two or more races, 3.2% were Asian alone, and 23.5% were Hispanic or Latino of any race. For 2019–2023, 18.0% of La Vergne residents were foreign born and 27.8% of residents age five and older spoke a language other than English at home.

In its 2026 rankings, Niche ranked La Vergne first on its list of the most diverse suburbs in Tennessee.

=== 2018 ===
As of the special census of 2018, there were 34,423 people (from 18,687 in 2000 census), 11,204 households (from 6,536 households in 2000), and 8,901 families residing in the city. The population density was 753.7 inhabitants per square mile (291.0/km^{2}). There were 6,994 housing units at an average density of 282.1 per square mile (108.9/km^{2}). The racial makeup of the city was 84.50% White, 11.02% African American, 0.43% Native American, 1.32% Asian, 0.07% Pacific Islander, 1.28% from other races, and 1.39% from two or more races. Hispanic or Latino of any race were 3.54% of the population.

There were 6,536 households, out of which 46.4% had children under the age of 18 living with them, 61.9% were married couples living together, 12.4% had a female householder with no husband present, and 20.6% were non-families. 15.3% of all households were made up of individuals, and 2.9% had someone living alone who was 65 years of age or older. The average household size was 2.86 and the average family size was 3.17.

In the city, the population was spread out, with 31.4% under the age of 18, 7.6% from 18 to 24, 38.9% from 25 to 44, 17.7% from 45 to 64, and 4.5% who were 65 years of age or older. The median age was 31 years. For every 100 females, there were 97.3 males. For every 100 females age 18 and over, there were 94.7 males.

The median income for a household in the city was $51,478, and the median income for a family was $55,226. Males had a median income of $35,743 versus $26,323 for females. The per capita income for the city was $19,580. About 4.1% of families and 4.8% of the population were below the poverty line, including 6.7% of those under age 18 and 5.7% of those age 65 or over.

The largest subdivision of homes in the state of Tennessee, Lake Forest Estates, is located in La Vergne, encompassing more than 3,100 homes.

== Economy ==
Manufacturing, publishing, distribution, retail, and warehousing have played major roles in La Vergne's modern economy. Firestone, later Bridgestone, opened in La Vergne in 1971, and several distribution and corporate facilities were added in the 21st century, including a Feed the Children distribution center in 2013, the ICEE Corporation headquarters in 2020, an Amazon distribution center in 2020, and a BJ's Wholesale Club location in 2023.

La Vergne hosts facilities associated with Ingram Content Group and Lightning Source, which has used La Vergne as a United States printing location and headquarters. In 2015, Hong Kong-based Sinomax announced a $28 million investment to convert a former Whirlpool plant into its North American manufacturing headquarters, with plans to create 350 jobs.

According to Census Bureau business data, La Vergne recorded $271.3 million in transportation and warehousing receipts/revenue and $823.8 million in retail sales in 2022.

== Parks and recreation ==
Veterans Memorial Park is a 55-acre city park in central La Vergne. Amenities include baseball and softball fields, basketball courts, a football field, picnic areas, pavilions, playgrounds, a skate park, tennis courts, green space, restrooms, and trails.

Outdoor recreation in and near the city is also connected to Percy Priest Lake, Hurricane Creek, and Poole Knobs Recreation Area, where the city lists boating, fishing, hiking, and camping opportunities.

== Culture and community ==
La Vergne's annual fall festival developed from the city's Old Timers Festival, first held in 1972. The festival has been held at Veterans Memorial Park and includes a parade, entertainment, food, craft vendors, and children's activities.

The La Vergne Public Library is described by the city as one of the community's cultural centers. The library offers programs and services for all ages and maintains a collection of more than 60,000 items, including books, audiobooks, DVDs, and music CDs.

== Schools ==
La Vergne is served by Rutherford County Schools. Public schools located in La Vergne include LaVergne High School, LaVergne Middle School, LaVergne Lake Elementary School, Rock Springs Elementary School, Roy Waldron School, and Simon Springs Community School. American Classical Academy Rutherford, a public charter school, is also listed by Rutherford County Schools at a La Vergne address.

== Sister City ==
La Vergne, France (1982)
