= Smyrna, Tennessee =

- Town
- Flag Seal

- Location of Smyrna in Rutherford County, TN.
- Coordinates: 35°58′46″N 86°31′16″W
- Country: United States
- State: Tennessee
- County: Rutherford
- Founded: 1855
- Incorporated: 1869
- Named for: Ancient Smyrna

Area
  - Total: 34.01 sq mi (88.09 km^{2})
  - Land: 33.91 sq mi (87.83 km^{2})
  - Water: 0.10 sq mi (0.26 km^{2})
- Elevation: 545 ft (166 m)

Population (2020)
  - Total: 53,070
  - Density: 1,565.0/sq mi (604.24/km^{2})
- Time zone: UTC-6 (Central (CST))
  - Summer (DST): UTC-5 (CDT)
- ZIP code: 37167
- Area code: 615
- FIPS code: 47-69420
- GNIS feature ID: 1270735
- Website: Town of Smyrna

Smyrna is a town located in Rutherford County, Tennessee. Smyrna's population was 53,070 at the 2020 census. Smyrna is part of the Nashville metropolitan area.

== History ==
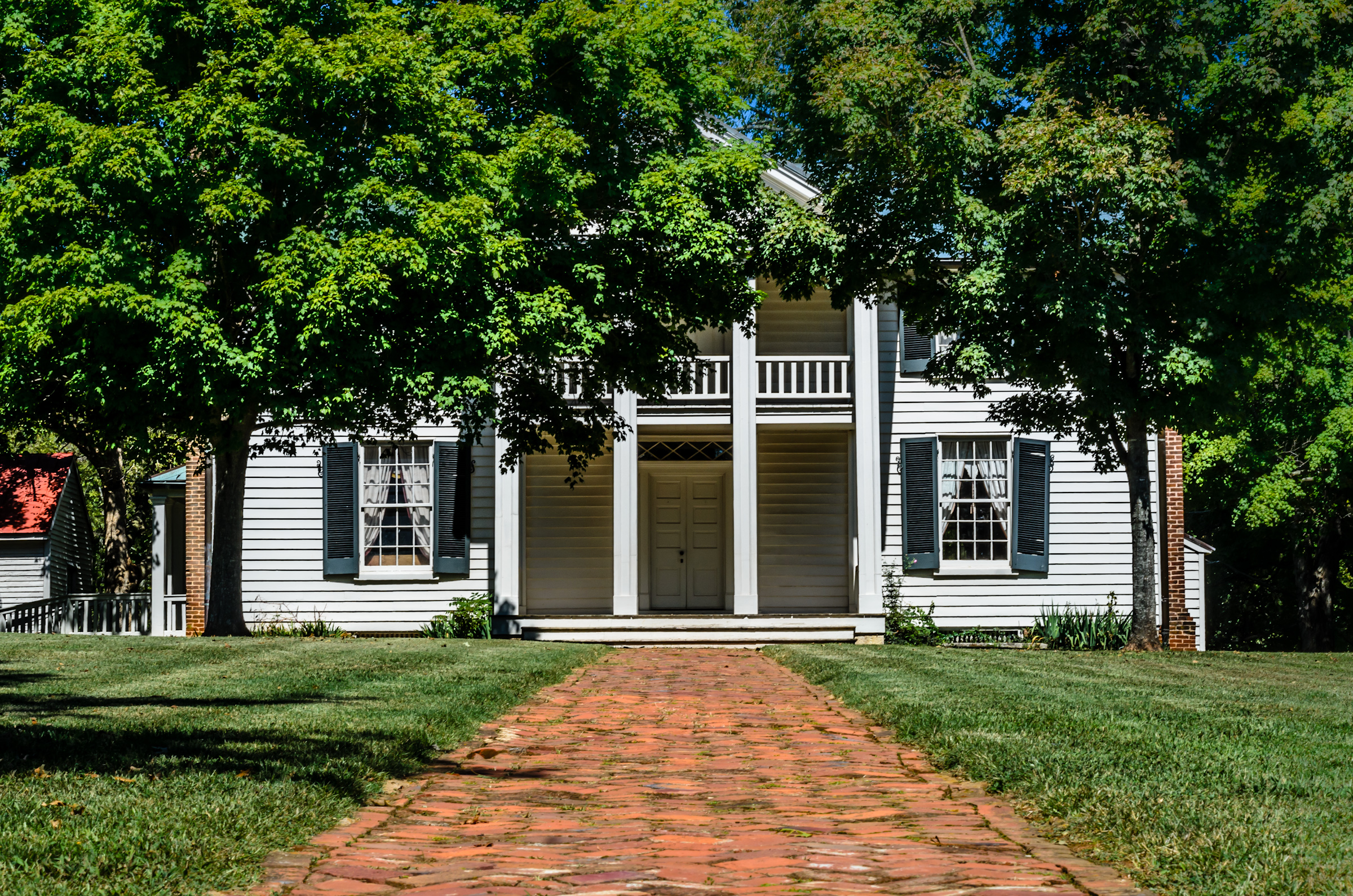
Sam Davis House

The town of Smyrna has its European American roots in the early 19th century and began as an agrarian community. It was important during the Civil War because its railroad station lies between Nashville and Chattanooga. One of the major events of the war for the town involved the Confederate States soldier Sam Davis, who, after being charged with spying, gave up his life instead of giving any information to the Union Army. He was captured November 20, 1863, and was hanged by Union forces on November 27 of that year. The Sam Davis Plantation, located on 160 acres (0.65 km^{2}) of well-maintained farmland, is the town's most important historical site.

Smyrna was originally incorporated in 1869 but its charter was rescinded by the state several years later. In 1915, the town re-incorporated and adopted a commission-mayor form of government.

In 1941 during World War II, Sewart Air Force Base was established here and served as a B-17 Flying Fortress and B-24 advanced training facility. During the 1950s and 1960s, the military personnel and dependents totaled more than 10,000 persons stationed at the base. The base was scheduled for closing in 1971. Most of the property was divided among the State of Tennessee, Rutherford County, and the Metropolitan Nashville Airport Authority. On its portion, the state opened and operates a Tennessee Army National Guard base and the Tennessee Rehabilitation Center. Much of the additional land was developed as the Smyrna/Rutherford County Airport Authority in 1990.

During the 1970s, many new industries moved to the area. The city began a period of growth stimulated by production of such companies as Better Bilt Aluminum (currently MI Metals), Cumberland Swan (currently known as Vi-Jon, Inc.), and Square D building plants. In the early 1980s, Nissan Motors constructed a manufacturing plant in the city, and in 1983, the first vehicle was produced. The Nissan plant now employs around 8,400 workers, has a production capacity of 640,000 vehicles annually, and covers an area of 5,200,000 sq ft (480,000 m^{2}). In 2012, Smyrna began manufacturing Nissan's electric car, the Nissan Leaf, and its batteries.

On March 14, 2000, the mayor and board of commissioners adopted a new charter. The city now operates under the city manager form of government, whereby the commissioners hire a city manager for daily operations.

On June 2, 2016, Blue Angels #6 crashed in Smyrna when practicing for the Great Tennessee Air show, killing pilot Capt. Jeff Kuss, USMC. The people of Smyrna raised funds to have a memorial built in his honor. The Capt. Jeff Kuss USMC Memorial sits across from the Smyrna Airport, where Capt. Kuss departed on his tragic final flight, and the centerpiece is a retired F/A-18 Hornet loaned to Smyrna from the United States Navy, painted in the colors of the Blue Angels performance squadron with Capt. Kuss' name under the cockpit hatch and the number 6 on the tails to represent the plane he flew on his final flight.

== Geography ==
According to the United States Census Bureau, the town has a total area of 23.0 square miles (60 km^{2}), of which 22.8 square miles (59 km^{2}) is land and 0.1 square miles (0.26 km^{2}) (0.61%) is water.

Portions of the Percy Priest Lake reservoir lie within the town limits. The two main waterways are Stones River and Stewarts Creek.

== Demographics ==
Historical population
Census	Pop.	Note	%±
1880	215		—
1920	463		—
1930	531		14.7%
1940	493		−7.2%
1950	1,544		213.2%
1960	3,612		133.9%
1970	5,698		57.8%
1980	8,839		55.1%
1990	13,647		54.4%
2000	25,569		87.4%
2010	39,974		56.3%
2020	53,070		32.8%
2025 (est.)	63,321	▲	19.3%
U.S. Decennial Census

=== 2020 census ===
As of the 2020 census, Smyrna had a population of 53,070. The median age was 34.7 years. 26.8% of residents were under the age of 18 and 11.5% were 65 years of age or older. For every 100 females, there were 92.6 males, and for every 100 females age 18 and over, there were 89.5 males.

98.6% of residents lived in urban areas, while 1.4% lived in rural areas.

There were 19,325 households in Smyrna, including 12,282 families. Of those households, 38.9% had children under the age of 18 living in them. Among households, 47.4% were married-couple households, 17.4% had a male householder with no spouse or partner present, and 28.2% had a female householder with no spouse or partner present. About 23.8% of all households were made up of individuals, and 8.3% had someone living alone who was 65 years of age or older.

There were 20,413 housing units, of which 5.3% were vacant. The homeowner vacancy rate was 1.6% and the rental vacancy rate was 7.2%.

Smyrna racial composition
Race	Number	Percentage
White (non-Hispanic)	29,728	56.02%
Black or African American (non-Hispanic)	8,554	16.12%
Native American	80	0.15%
Asian	3,063	5.77%
Pacific Islander	55	0.1%
Other/Mixed	2,603	4.9%
Hispanic or Latino	8,988	16.94%

=== 2010 census ===
As of the census of 2010, there were 39,974 people, 14,807 households, and 10,509 families living in the city. The population density was 1,753.25 persons per square mile, and the housing unit density was 649.43 units per square mile. The racial makeup of the city was 75.00% White, 11.21% Black or African American, 4.35% Asian, 0.59% Native American, 0.08% Pacific Islander, 6.02% from other races, and 2.75% from two or more races. Those of Hispanic or Latino origins constituted 10.72% of the population.

Of the 14,807 households, 37.23% had children under the age of 18 living in them, 50.46% were married couples living together, 5.54% had a male householder with no wife present, 14.98% had a female householder with no husband present, and 29.03% were non-families. 23.03% of all households were made up of individuals, and 5.94% had someone living alone who was 65 years of age or older. The average household size was 2.68 and the average family size was 3.15.

Of the 39,974 people living in the city, 27.89% were under the age of 18, 63.50% were between the ages of 18 and 64, and 8.60% were 65 years of age or older. The median age was 33.0 years. 51.32% of all persons were female and 48.68% were male.

The median household income in the city was $51,505, and the median family income was $61,286. Males had a median income of $43,633 versus $37,029 for females. The per capita income for the city was $24,448. About 9.4% of families and 12.2% of the population were below the poverty line, including 18.3% of those under the age of 18 and 7.4% of those age 65 and over.

=== 2000 census ===
As of the census of 2000, there were 25,569 people, 9,608 households, and 7,061 families living in the town. The population density was 1,119.8 inhabitants per square mile (432.4/km^{2}). There were 10,016 housing units at an average density of 438.6 per square mile (169.3/km^{2}). The racial makeup of the town was 87.23% White, 7.82% African American, 0.29% Native American, 1.21% Asian, 0.08% Pacific Islander, 1.81% from other races, and 1.56% from two or more races. Hispanic or Latino of any race were 4.31% of the population.

There were 9,608 households, out of which 39.8% had children under the age of 18 living with them, 55.0% were married couples living together, 14.2% had a female householder with no husband present, and 26.5% were non-families. 21.1% of all households were made up of individuals, and 4.3% had someone living alone who was 65 years of age or older. The average household size was 2.62 and the average family size was 3.04.

In the town, the population was spread out, with 27.6% under the age of 18, 10.5% from 18 to 24, 35.1% from 25 to 44, 19.9% from 45 to 64, and 6.8% who were 65 years of age or older. The median age was 32 years. For every 100 females, there were 95.9 males. For every 100 females age 18 and over, there were 92.9 males.

The median income for a household in the town was $44,405, and the median income for a family was $51,550. Males had a median income of $37,130 versus $27,325 for females. The per capita income for the town was $19,704. About 6.7% of families and 8.8% of the population were below the poverty line, including 11.4% of those under age 18 and 8.2% of those age 65 or over.

== Economy ==
The Nissan Smyrna Assembly Plant is the largest automotive assembly plant in the US, making 640,000 cars per year. It began in 1983, and has made more than 10 million cars since then. Manufacturing of batteries for the Leaf began at the site in 2012. Nissan's goal is that the plant in Smyrna will eventually produce 150,000 electric cars, and 200,000 electric car batteries per year. In addition to serving as the U.S. production site for the Leaf, the plant assembles five other models.

The top employers in the city are:

- Nissan (automobile manufacturing): 8,400
- Asurion (communications): 1,165
- Vi-Jon (personal care products): 737
- Stonecrest Medical Center (hospital): 550
- Taylor Farms (produce): 550
- Square D/Schneider Electric (electrical products): 474

Prior to their dissolution, RegionsAir (formerly Corporate Airlines) and Capitol Air were headquartered in Smyrna.

== Parks and recreation ==
Smyrna has 10 parks, a public golf course, 7 miles of greenway trails, and an outdoor water park.

== Education ==
Smyrna is served by the Rutherford County Schools school district.

=== Public schools ===
- Cedar Grove Elementary (Timberwolves)
- David Youree Elementary School (Eagles)
- John Colemon Elementary School (Cougars)
- Smyrna Elementary School (Eagles)
- Smyrna Primary School (Huskies)
- Stewartsboro Elementary School (Stallions)
- Stewarts Creek Elementary School (Cardinals)
- Rock Springs Middle School (Knights)
- Rocky Fork Elementary School (Thunder)
- Rocky Fork Middle School (Storm)
- Rutherford County Virtual School (Trailblazers)
- Smyrna Middle School (Panthers)
- Stewarts Creek Middle School (Falcons)
- Stewarts Creek High School (Redhawks)
- Smyrna West Alternative School
- Thurman Francis Arts Academy (Rams)

=== Private schools ===
- Community Christian Day School
- Lancaster Christian Academy

== Notable people ==
- William Barksdale, Confederate general and Mississippi politician. Born in Smyrna in 1821, died at the Battle of Gettysburg.
- Chad Chaffin, racing driver
- Sam Davis, Confederate spy. Born 1842. The Sam Davis home is located in Smyrna.
- Johnny Gooch, Major League Baseball player, coach and scout; born in Smyrna in 1897.
- Sonny Gray, Major League pitcher for the Boston Red Sox; born in 1989.
- Ben H. Guill, former U.S. Representative from Texas; born in Smyrna in 1909.
- Patricia McKissack, children's writer. Born in Smyrna on August 9, 1944.
- Jalen Ramsey, NFL cornerback for the Pittsburgh Steelers; born in Nashville in 1994, lived in Smyrna
- Townes Van Zandt, (1944–1997), musician.

== Sister City ==
- Zama, Kanagawa, Japan

== Government ==
=== Past mayors ===
- Joseph Engles, Smyrna’s very first mayor December 20, 1869 – 1875
- Albert Wilkes Page, Mayor of Smyrna when Charter was lost in 1881.
- J.W. Engles 1915–?
- Sam Ridley and Knox Ridley, twins who are both former Mayors of Smyrna, born in Smyrna, June 23, 1919, Sam in 1980 was believed to be the longest serving city official in Tennessee. He was first elected to the Smyrna city commission in 1947. [1947–1987]
- Paul Johns
- Bob Spivey, served as Mayor for the Town of Smyrna from 2001 until 2009
- Tony D.Dover, 2009–2013
- Mary Esther Reed, 2013–present
