= Rutherford County Schools (Tennessee) =

School district in Murfreesboro, Tennessee, United States

Rutherford County
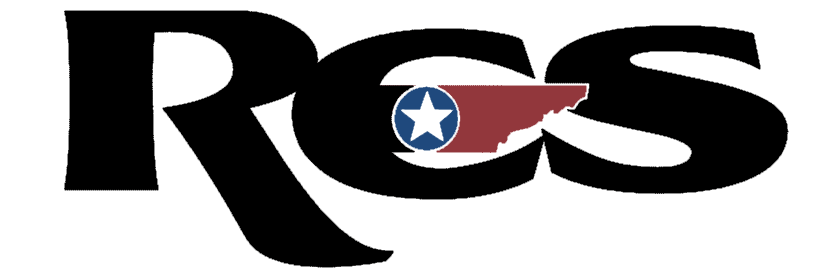

Address
- 2240 Southpark Blvd Murfreesboro, Tennessee, 37128; United States

District information
- Grades: PK–12
- Superintendent: Dr. James Sullivan
- NCES District ID: 4703690

Students and staff
- Enrollment: 47,458 (as of 2019-20)
- Staff: 5,207.50 (FTE) (as of 2018-19)
- Student–teacher ratio: 15.39 (as of 2019-20)

Other information
- Website: www.rcschools.net

Rutherford County Schools is a school district based in Murfreesboro, Tennessee, United States. It serves Rutherford County, Tennessee, grades pre-kindergarten to 12.

The district gained national attention during the COVID-19 pandemic when local high school student Grady Knox was harassed by district meeting attendees after explaining that his grandmother had died due to the lack of mask-wearing in local schools. Outgoing school board chairman Coy Young subsequently apologized, stating his "regret the young man was treated the way he was."

== Schools ==
=== Elementary schools ===
- Barfield Elementary School
- Blackman Elementary School
- Brown's Chapel Elementary School
- Buchanan Elementary School
- Cedar Grove Elementary School
- Christiana Elementary School
- David Youree Elementary School
- Eagleville School (PK–12)
- Homer Pittard Campus School (K–6)
- John Colemon Elementary School
- Kittrell Elementary School
- Lascassas Elementary School
- Lavergne Lake Elementary School
- Roy Waldron Annex (PK–1)
- McFadden School of Excellence (K–5)
- Plainview Elementary School
- Poplar Hill Elementary School
- Rock Springs Elementary School
- Rockvale Elementary School (PK–5)
- Rocky Fork Elementary School (K-5)
- Roy L. Waldron Elementary School (2–5)
- Simon Springs Community School (1-8)
- Smyrna Elementary School
- Smyrna Primary School
- Stewarts Creek Elementary School
- Stewartsboro Elementary School
- Thurman Francis Arts Academy (K–8)
- Walter Hill Elementary School
- Wilson Elementary School

=== Middle schools ===
- Blackman Middle School est. 2002
- Christiana Middle School
- Eagleville School (PK–12)
- La Vergne Middle School
- Oakland Middle School
- Rock Springs Middle School
- Rocky Fork Middle School est.2017
- Rockvale Middle School (6–8)
- Siegel Middle School
- Smyrna Middle School
- Stewarts Creek Middle School
- Thurman Francis Arts Academy (K–8)
- Whitworth-Buchanan Middle School

=== High schools ===
- Blackman High School est. 2000
- Central Magnet School (6-12) est. 2010
- Eagleville School (PK-12) est. 1996
- Holloway High School est. 1928
- La Vergne High School est. 1988
- Oakland High School 1972
- Riverdale High School 1972
- Rockvale High School est. 2019
- Siegel High School est. 2003
- Smyrna High School est. 1919
- Stewarts Creek High School (Smyrna) est. 2013

=== Other schools ===
- Daniel McKee Alternative School (6–12)
- Rutherford County Adult High School
- Smyrna West School (7–12)
- Rutherford County Virtual School (3-12)
