= Blackman High School =

Location
- 3956 Blaze Dr; Murfreesboro, Tennessee 37128; United States; 35.858450°N 86.477100°W

Information
- School type: Public school
- Established: 2000
- School district: Rutherford County
- CEEB code: 431636
- Principal: Justin Smith
- Staff: 133.63 (on an FTE basis)
- Grades: 9-12
- Enrollment: 2,233 (2023–2024)
- Student to teacher ratio: 16.71
- Colors: Blue; White; Orange
- Athletics: TSSAA
- Mascot: Dante
- Team name: Blackman Blaze
- Newspaper: The Blackman Voice
- Yearbook: The Eternal Flame
- Website: bhs.rcschools.net

Blackman High School is a high school located in Murfreesboro, Tennessee, United States which is operated by the Rutherford County Schools. The school was established in 2000 to complement the existing Blackman Elementary School.

== History ==
Blackman High School was established in 2000 to provide a primary school for the residents living in western Rutherford County. It was the first High School established in Rutherford county since 1972.

== Campus ==
Recent additions to Blackman High include the construction of a new classroom wing, the "G" hall, 3 new portables outside of the west wing of the school, a large band room, and a field area near the cafeteria. The baseball program built a fieldhouse in 2005 and the football program finished the construction of a fieldhouse in 2010.

== Athletics ==
The Backyard Brawl is the name of the rivalry between Blackman High School and Riverdale High School. This rivalry dates back to Blackman High Schools' opening in 2000. Most of Blackman's student body went to Riverdale and Oakland the year before. Riverdale and Oakland were the only two high schools open in Murfreesboro at the time.

== Notable alumni ==
- Drew Beam, pitcher in the Kansas City Royals organization
- Crystal Dangerfield, point guard for the Dallas Wings
- Jauan Jennings, NFL football player with the Minnesota Vikings
- Trey Knox, NFL tight end for the Minnesota Vikings, played college football for the Arkansas Razorbacks and the South Carolina Gamecocks
- David Price (born 1985), Major League Baseball pitcher
- Adam Smith, former professional football offensive guard
- Master Teague, former NFL running back for the Chicago Bears and the Pittsburgh Steelers
- Darius Thompson, American professional basketball player
- Zander Wiel, American professional baseball outfielder and first baseman
