= 2005 Big 12 Conference women's basketball tournament =

- Classification: Division I
- Teams: 12
- Site: Municipal Auditorium; Kansas City, Missouri
- Champions: Baylor (1st title)
- Winning coach: Kim Mulkey (1st title)
- MVP: Sophia Young (Baylor)
- Attendance: 26,929 (overall); 6,108 (championship)
- Television: FSN

2004–05 Big 12 Conference women's basketball standings
	Conf.				Overall
Team	W		L	PCT	W		L	PCT
No. 5 Baylor †	14	–	2	.875	33	–	3	.917
No. 13 Texas	13	–	3	.813	22	–	9	.710
No. 16 Kansas State	12	–	4	.750	24	–	8	.750
No. 14 Texas Tech	12	–	4	.750	24	–	8	.750
No. 19 Iowa State	12	–	4	.750	23	–	7	.767
Nebraska	8	–	8	.500	18	–	14	.563
Oklahoma	8	–	8	.500	17	–	13	.567
Kansas	5	–	11	.313	12	–	16	.429
Missouri	4	–	12	.250	11	–	18	.379
Texas A&M	4	–	12	.250	16	–	15	.516
Oklahoma State	2	–	14	.125	7	–	20	.259
Colorado	2	–	14	.125	9	–	19	.321
† 2005 Big 12 Tournament winner Rankings from AP poll

The 2005 Big 12 Conference women's basketball tournament, known for sponsorship reasons as the 2005 Phillips 66 Big 12 Women's Basketball Championship, was the 2005 edition of the Big 12 Conference's championship tournament. The tournament was held at the Municipal Auditorium in Kansas City from 8 March until 12 March 2005. The Quarterfinals, Semifinals, and Finals were televised on the ESPN family of networks. The championship game, held on March 12, 2005, featured the number 1 seeded Baylor Lady Bears, and the number 3 seeded Kansas State Wildcats. Baylor won the contest by a 68-55 margin.

== Seeding ==
2005 Big 12 Conference women's basketball tournament seeds
Seed	School	Conf.	Over.	Tiebreaker
1	Baylor ‡#	14–2	33–3	
2	Texas #	13–3	22–9	
3	Kansas State #	12–4	24–8	
4	Texas Tech #	12–4	24–8	
5	Iowa State	12–4	23–7	
6	Nebraska	8–8	18–14	
7	Oklahoma	8–8	17–13	
8	Kansas	5–11	12–16	
9	Missouri	4–12	11–18	
10	Texas A&M	4–12	16–15	
11	Oklahoma State	2–14	7–20	
12	Colorado	2–14	9–19	
‡ – Big 12 Conference regular season champions, and tournament No. 1 seed. # – Received a single-bye in the conference tournament. Overall records include all games played in the Big 12 Conference tournament.

== Schedule ==
Session	Game	Time	Matchup	Television	Attendance
First round – Tuesday, March 8
1	1	12:00 pm	#9 Missouri 62 vs #8 Kansas 57		3,251
1	2	2:30 pm	#5 Iowa State 64 vs #12 Colorado 62		3,251
2	3	6:00 pm	#7 Oklahoma 86 vs #10 Texas A&M 65		4,345
2	4	8:30 pm	#6 Nebraska 60 vs #11 Oklahoma State 45		4,345
Quarterfinals – Wednesday, March 9
3	5	12:00 pm	#1 Baylor 70 vs #9 Missouri 52	FSN	5,119
3	6	2:30 pm	#4 Texas Tech 61 vs #5 Iowa State 59	FSN	5,119
4	7	6:00 pm	#2 Texas 65 vs #7 Oklahoma 59	FSN	4,038
4	8	8:30 pm	#3 Kansas State 71 vs #6 Nebraska 45	FSN	4,038
Semifinals – Thursday, March 10
5	9	6:00 pm	#1 Baylor 58 vs #4 Texas Tech 57	FSN	4,068
5	10	8:30 pm	#3 Kansas State 72 vs #2 Texas 69	FSN	4,068
Final – Saturday, March 12
6	11	6:00 pm	#1 Baylor 68 vs #3 Kansas State 55	FSN	6,108
Game times in CT. #-Rankings denote tournament seed

== Tournament bracket ==
First round (March 8)
8	Kansas	57
9	Missouri	62
5	Iowa State	64
12	Colorado	62
7	Oklahoma	86
10	Texas A&M	65
6	Nebraska	60
11	Oklahoma State	45

Quarterfinals (March 9)
1	Baylor	70
9	Missouri	52
4	Texas Tech	61
5	Iowa State	59
2	Texas	65
7	Oklahoma	59
3	Kansas State	71
6	Nebraska	45

Semifinals (March 10)
1	Baylor	58
4	Texas Tech	57
2	Texas	69
3	Kansas State	72

Finals (March 12)
1	Baylor	68
3	Kansas State	55

== All-Tournament team ==
Most Outstanding Player – Sophia Young, Baylor

Player	Team
Sophia Young	Baylor
Steffanie Blackmon	Baylor
Kendra Wecker	Kansas State
Megan Mahoney	Kansas State
Tiffany Jackson	Texas

== See also ==
- 2005 Big 12 Conference men's basketball tournament
- 2005 NCAA Women's Division I Basketball Tournament
- 2004–05 NCAA Division I women's basketball rankings
