= 2004–05 Mid-American Conference women's basketball season =

- League: NCAA Division I
- Sport: Basketball
- Number of teams: 13

Regular season
- Champions: Bowling Green
- Season MVP: Kate Endress

Tournament
- Champions: Bowling Green
- Runners-up: Kent State
- Finals MVP: Kate Achter

Mid-American women's basketball seasons
- ← 2003–04 2005–06 →

2004–05 Mid-American Conference women's basketball standings
	Conf.				Overall
Team	W		L	PCT	W		L	PCT
Kent State	11	–	4	.733	21	–	9	.700
Marshall	11	–	4	.733	19	–	10	.655
Ohio	8	–	7	.533	13	–	16	.448
Miami (OH)	8	–	8	.500	15	–	14	.517
Akron	3	–	13	.188	3	–	25	.107
Buffalo	2	–	14	.125	4	–	24	.143
West
Bowling Green †	13	–	3	.813	23	–	7	.767
Eastern Michigan	11	–	5	.688	23	–	7	.767
Ball State	11	–	5	.688	16	–	13	.552
Toledo	8	–	7	.533	14	–	15	.483
Western Michigan	7	–	8	.467	10	–	18	.357
Central Michigan	4	–	11	.267	10	–	18	.357
Northern Illinois	4	–	12	.250	7	–	21	.250
† 2005 MAC tournament winner Rankings from AP poll

The 2004–05 Mid-American Conference women's basketball season began with practices in October 2004, followed by the start of the 2004–05 NCAA Division I women's basketball season in November. Conference play began in January 2005 and concluded in March 2005. Bowling Green won the regular season title with a record of 13–3. Kate Endress of Ball State was MAC player of the year.

Regular season champion Bowling Green won the MAC tournament over seventh seeded Kent State. Kate Achter of Bowling Green was the tournament MVP. Bowling Green lost to Kansas State in the first of the NCAA tournament. Eastern Michigan played in the WNIT.

== Preseason Awards ==
The preseason poll was announced by the league office on October 20, 2004.

=== Preseason women's basketball coaches poll ===
==== East Division ====
Miami

==== West Division ====
Eastern Michigan

=== Honors ===
Honor	Recipient
Preseason All-MAC East	Amanda Jackson, Miami
Preseason All-MAC East	Cindi Merrill, Miami
Preseason All-MAC East	Lindsay Shearer, Kent State
Preseason All-MAC East	Malika Willoughby, Kent State
Preseason All-MAC East	Sikeetha Shepard-Hall, Marshall
Preseason All-MAC West	Nikki Knapp, Eastern Michigan
Preseason All-MAC West	Ryan Coleman, Eastern Michigan
Preseason All-MAC West	Kate Endress, Ball State
Preseason All-MAC West	Ali Mann, Bowling Green
Preseason All-MAC West	Carrie Moore, Western Michigan
Preseason All-MAC West	Casey Rost, Western Michigan

== Postseason ==
=== Postseason Awards ===
1. Coach of the Year: Curt Miller, Bowling Green
2. Player of the Year: Kate Endress, Ball State
3. Freshman of the Year: Heather Turner, Buffalo
4. Defensive Player of the Year: Malika Willoughby, Kent State
5. Sixth Man of the Year: Simone Redd, Ohio

=== Honors ===
Honor	Recipient
Postseason All-MAC First Team	Ryan Coleman, Eastern Michigan
Postseason All-MAC First Team	Melissa DeGrate, Kent State
Postseason All-MAC First Team	Kate Endress, Ball State
Postseason All-MAC First Team	Carrie Moore, Western Michigan
Postseason All-MAC First Team	Lindsay Shearer, Kent State
Postseason All-MAC Second Team	Liz Honegger, Bowling Green
Postseason All-MAC Second Team	Kelly Koerber, Western Michigan
Postseason All-MAC Second Team	Ali Mann, Bowling Green
Postseason All-MAC Second Team	Cindi Merrill, Miami
Postseason All-MAC Second Team	Sikeetha Shepard-Hall, Marshall
Postseason All-MAC Third Team	Danielle Bishop, Toledo
Postseason All-MAC Third Team	Erika Ford, Eastern Michigan
Postseason All-MAC Third Team	Karin Hoogendam, Toledo
Postseason All-MAC Third Team	Nikki Knapp, Eastern Michigan
Postseason All-MAC Third Team	Stephanie Raymond, Northern Illinois
Postseason All-MAC Honorable Mention	Crystal Champion, Marshall
Postseason All-MAC Honorable Mention	Carin Horne, Bowling Green
Postseason All-MAC Honorable Mention	Amanda Jackson, Miami
Postseason All-MAC Honorable Mention	Simone Redd, Ohio
Postseason All-MAC Honorable Mention	Malika Willoughby, Kent State
All-MAC Freshman Team	Kate Achter, Bowling Green
All-MAC Freshman Team	Julie DeMuth, Ball State
All-MAC Freshman Team	Simone Redd, Ohio
All-MAC Freshman Team	Olivia Terry, Toledo
All-MAC Freshman Team	Heather Turner, Buffalo

== See also ==
2004–05 Mid-American Conference men's basketball season
