= 2005 MAC women's basketball tournament =

- Classification: Division I
- Teams: 13
- Site: Gund Arena; Cleveland, Ohio
- Champions: Bowling Green
- Winning coach: Curt Miller
- MVP: Kate Achter (Bowling Green)
- MAC women's basketball tournaments

2004–05 Mid-American Conference women's basketball standings
	Conf.				Overall
Team	W		L	PCT	W		L	PCT
Kent State	11	–	4	.733	21	–	9	.700
Marshall	11	–	4	.733	19	–	10	.655
Ohio	8	–	7	.533	13	–	16	.448
Miami (OH)	8	–	8	.500	15	–	14	.517
Akron	3	–	13	.188	3	–	25	.107
Buffalo	2	–	14	.125	4	–	24	.143
West
Bowling Green †	13	–	3	.813	23	–	7	.767
Eastern Michigan	11	–	5	.688	23	–	7	.767
Ball State	11	–	5	.688	16	–	13	.552
Toledo	8	–	7	.533	14	–	15	.483
Western Michigan	7	–	8	.467	10	–	18	.357
Central Michigan	4	–	11	.267	10	–	18	.357
Northern Illinois	4	–	12	.250	7	–	21	.250
† 2005 MAC tournament winner Rankings from AP poll

The 2005 Mid-American Conference women's basketball tournament was the post-season basketball tournament for the Mid-American Conference (MAC) 2004–05 college basketball season. The 2005 tournament was held March 5–12, 2005. Regular season champion Bowling Green won the championship over Kent State. Kate Achter of Bowling Green was the MVP.

== Format ==
The top three seeds received byes into the quarterfinals. The first round was played at campus sites. All other rounds were held at Gund Arena.

== Bracket ==
First round March 5, 2005
8	Miami	74
9	Western Michigan	71
4	Eastern Michigan	79
13	Buffalo	46
5	Ball State	77
12	Akron	51
7	Ohio	71
10	Central Michigan	43
6	Toledo	76
11	Northern Illinois	61

Quarterfinals; March 9, 2005
1	Bowling Green	84
8	Miami	68
4	Eastern Michigan	72
5	Ball State	64
2	Kent State	93
7	Ohio	74
3	Marshall	68
6	Toledo	56

Semifinals; March 11, 2005
1	Bowling Green	77
4	Eastern Michigan	57
2	Kent State	73
3	Marshall	57

Championship; March 12, 2005
1	Bowling Green	81
7	Kent State	75

== All-Tournament Team ==
Tournament MVP – Kate Achter, Bowling Green

Player	Team
Lindsay Shearer	Kent State
Melissa DeGrate	Kent State
Casey McDowell	Bowling Green
Liz Honegegr	Bowling Green
Kate Achter	Bowling Green
