= 2004–05 Ohio Bobcats women's basketball team =

Intercollegiate basketball season

2004–05 Ohio Bobcats women's basketball
- Conference: Mid-American Conference
- East Division
- Record: 13–16 (8–7 MAC)
- Head coach: Lynn Bria (6th season)
- Home arena: Convocation Center

2004–05 Mid-American Conference women's basketball standings
	Conf.				Overall
Team	W		L	PCT	W		L	PCT
Kent State	11	–	4	.733	21	–	9	.700
Marshall	11	–	4	.733	19	–	10	.655
Ohio	8	–	7	.533	13	–	16	.448
Miami (OH)	8	–	8	.500	15	–	14	.517
Akron	3	–	13	.188	3	–	25	.107
Buffalo	2	–	14	.125	4	–	24	.143
West
Bowling Green †	13	–	3	.813	23	–	7	.767
Eastern Michigan	11	–	5	.688	23	–	7	.767
Ball State	11	–	5	.688	16	–	13	.552
Toledo	8	–	7	.533	14	–	15	.483
Western Michigan	7	–	8	.467	10	–	18	.357
Central Michigan	4	–	11	.267	10	–	18	.357
Northern Illinois	4	–	12	.250	7	–	21	.250
† 2005 MAC tournament winner Rankings from AP poll

The 2004–05 Ohio Bobcats women's basketball team represented Ohio University during the 2004–05 NCAA Division I women's basketball season. The Bobcats, led by seventh-year head coach Lynn Bria, in her final year, played their home games at the Convocation Center in Athens, Ohio as a member of the Mid-American Conference. They finished the season 13–16 and 8–7 in MAC play.

== Preseason ==
The preseason poll was announced by the league office on October 20, 2004. Miami and Eastern Michigan were picked to win their respective divisions.

== Schedule ==
Date time, TV	Rank^{#}	Opponent^{#}	Result	Record	Site (attendance) city, state
Non-conference regular season
Nov 19, 2004*		Oakland	W 107–98	1–0	
Nov 23, 2004*		at Youngstown State	W 85–79	2–0	
Nov 28, 2004*		at Wright State	L 84–97	2–1	
Dec 1, 2004*		No. 11 Ohio State	L 37–107	2–2	
Dec 4, 2004*		Evansville	L 77–104	2–3	
Dec 8, 2004*		at Sacramento State	L 76–83	2–4	
Dec 11, 2004*		at Wyoming	L 43–89	2–5	
Dec 15, 2004*		at Chicago State	L 45–58	2–6	
Dec 19, 2004*		Cleveland State	W 62–56	3–6	
Dec 29, 2004*		UNC Wilmington	W 71–67	4–6	
Dec 31, 2004*		at Duquesne	L 80–88	4–7	
MAC regular season
Jan 5, 2005		Kent State	W 56–50	5–7 (1–0)	
Jan 8, 2005		at Miami (OH)	L 71–75	5–8 (1–1)	
Jan 11, 2005		at Akron	W 80–69	6–8 (2–1)	
Jan 15, 2005		Central Michigan	W 71–70	7–8 (3–1)	
Jan 18, 2005		at Marshall	L 87–88	7–9 (3–1)	
Jan 22, 2005		at Eastern Michigan	L 61–93	7–10 (3–2)	
Jan 29, 2005		Buffalo	W 73–69	8–10 (4–2)	
Feb 2, 2005		Western Michigan	W 85–73	9–10 (5–2)	
Feb 5, 2005		at Bowling Green	L 59–86	9–11 (5–3)	
Feb 9, 2005		Marshall	L 63–72	9–12 (5–4)	
Feb 12, 2005		at Toledo	L 65–70	9–13 (5–5)	
Feb 15, 2005		Akron	W 70–56	10–13 (6–5)	
Feb 19, 2005		Northern Illinois	W 71–64	11–13 (7–5)	
Feb 23, 2005		at Kent State	L 39–74	11–14 (7–6)	
Feb 26, 2005		at Ball State	L 65–81	11–15 (7–7)	
Mar 1, 2005		Miami (OH)	W 65–63	12–15 (8–7)	
MAC Tournament
Mar 5, 2005		Central Michigan	W 71–43	13–15	
Mar 9, 2005		vs. Kent State	L 74–93	13–16	
*Non-conference game. ^{#}Rankings from AP Poll. (#) Tournament seedings in parentheses. All times are in Eastern Time.

== Awards and honors ==
=== All-MAC Awards ===
Postseason All-MAC teams
Team	Player	Position	Year
All-MAC Honorable Mention	Simone Redd		Fr.
All-MAC Freshman Team	Simone Redd		Fr.
