= 2013 Big 12 Conference women's basketball tournament =

- Classification: Division I
- Season: 2012–13
- Teams: 10
- Site: American Airlines Center; Dallas, Texas
- Champions: Baylor (5th title)
- Winning coach: Kim Mulkey (5th title)
- MVP: Brittney Griner (Baylor)
- Attendance: 35,183 (overall); 8,662 (championship)
- Television: Big 12 Digital Network, FSN

2012–13 Big 12 Conference women's basketball standings
	Conf.				Overall
Team	W		L	PCT	W		L	PCT
No. 1 Baylor †	18	–	0	1.000	34	–	2	.944
No. 23 Iowa State	12	–	6	.667	24	–	9	.727
Oklahoma	11	–	7	.611	24	–	11	.686
Texas Tech	11	–	7	.611	21	–	11	.656
Oklahoma State	9	–	9	.500	22	–	11	.667
West Virginia	9	–	9	.500	17	–	14	.548
Kansas	8	–	10	.444	20	–	14	.588
Kansas State	5	–	13	.278	19	–	18	.514
Texas	5	–	13	.278	12	–	18	.400
TCU	2	–	16	.111	9	–	21	.300
† 2013 Big 12 Tournament winner Rankings from AP poll

The 2013 Big 12 Conference women's basketball tournament, known for sponsorship reasons as the 2013 Phillips 66 Big 12 Women's Basketball Championship, was the 2013 edition of the Big 12 Conference's championship tournament. The tournament was held at the American Airlines Center in Dallas from March 5–8, 2013. The quarterfinals, semifinals, and finals were televised on Fox Sports Net. The championship game was held on March 11, 2013.

== Seeding ==
2013 Big 12 Conference women's basketball tournament seeds
Seed	School	Conf.	Over.	Tiebreaker
1	Baylor ‡#	18–0	34–2	
2	Iowa State #	12–6	24–9	
3	Oklahoma #	11–7	24–11	
4	Texas Tech #	11–7	21–11	
5	Oklahoma State #	9–9	22–11	
6	West Virginia #	9–9	17–14	
7	Kansas	8–10	20–14	
8	Kansas State	5–13	19–18	
9	Texas	5–13	12–18	
10	TCU	2–16	9–21	
‡ – Big 12 Conference regular season champions, and tournament No. 1 seed. # – Received a single-bye in the conference tournament. Overall records include all games played in the Big 12 Conference tournament.

== Schedule ==
Session	Game	Time	Matchup	Television	Attendance
First round – Friday, March 8
1	1	5:00 pm	#8 Kansas State 51 vs #9 Texas 49	Big 12 Digital; Network	5,925
1	2	7:30 pm	#7 Kansas 83 vs #10 TCU 61	Big 12 Digital; Network	5,925
Quarterfinals – Saturday, March 9
2	3	11:00 am	#5 Oklahoma State 59 vs #4 Texas Tech 54	FSN	7,311
2	4	1:30 pm	#1 Baylor 80 vs #8 Kansas State 47	FSN	7,311
3	5	5:00 pm	#2 Iowa State 77 vs #7 Kansas 62	FSN	6,056
3	6	7:30 pm	#3 Oklahoma 65 vs #6 West Virginia 64	FSN	6,056
Semifinals – Sunday, March 10
4	7	12:00 pm	#1 Baylor 77 vs #5 Oklahoma State 69	FSN	7,229
4	8	2:30 pm	#2 Iowa State 79 vs #3 Oklahoma 60	FSN	7,229
Final – Monday, March 11
5	9	11:00 am	#1 Baylor 75 vs #2 Iowa State 47	FSN	8,662
Game times in CT. #-Rankings denote tournament seed

== Bracket ==
First round March 8, 2013
8	Kansas State	51
9	Texas	49
7	Kansas	83
10	Texas Christian	61

Quarterfinals; March 9, 2013
1	Baylor	80
8	Kansas State	47
4	Texas Tech	54
5	Oklahoma State	59
3	Oklahoma	65
6	West Virginia	64
2	Iowa State	77
7	Kansas	62

Semifinals; March 10, 2013
1	Baylor	77
5	Oklahoma State	69
3	Oklahoma	60
2	Iowa State	79

Championship game March 11, 2013
1	Baylor	75
2	Iowa State	47

All times Central
* – Denotes overtime

== All-Tournament team ==
Most Outstanding Player – Brittney Griner, Baylor

Player	Team
Brittney Griner	Baylor
Odyssey Sims	Baylor
Destiny Williams	Baylor
Anna Prins	Iowa State
Toni Young	Oklahoma State

== See also ==
- 2013 Big 12 Conference men's basketball tournament
- 2013 NCAA Women's Division I Basketball Tournament
- 2012–13 NCAA Division I women's basketball rankings
