= 2004–05 Connecticut Huskies women's basketball team =

Intercollegiate basketball season

2004–05 Connecticut Huskies women's basketball

Big East tournament champions

NCAA tournament, Sweet Sixteen
- Conference: Big East Conference

Ranking
- Coaches: No. 10
- AP: No. 10
- Record: 25–8 (13–3 Big East)
- Head coach: Geno Auriemma
- Associate head coach: Chris Dailey
- Assistant coach: Jamelle Elliott
- Home arena: Harry A. Gampel Pavilion

2004–05 Big East Conference women's basketball standings
	Conf.				Overall
Team	W		L	PCT	W		L	PCT
No. 9 Rutgers	14	–	2	.875	28	–	7	.800
No. 11 Notre Dame	13	–	3	.813	27	–	6	.818
No. 10 Connecticut †	13	–	3	.813	25	–	8	.758
No. 25 Boston College	10	–	6	.625	20	–	10	.667
Villanova	10	–	6	.625	19	–	12	.613
St. John's	7	–	9	.438	20	–	11	.645
West Virginia	7	–	9	.438	21	–	13	.618
Georgetown	7	–	9	.438	12	–	16	.429
Seton Hall	6	–	10	.375	14	–	14	.500
Pittsburgh	5	–	11	.313	13	–	15	.464
Syracuse	4	–	12	.250	13	–	16	.448
Providence	0	–	16	.000	1	–	27	.036
† 2005 Big East Tournament winner Rankings from AP poll

The 2004–05 Connecticut Huskies women's basketball team represented the University of Connecticut during the 2004–05 NCAA Division I women's basketball season. Coached by Geno Auriemma, the Huskies played their home games at the Hartford Civic Center in Hartford, and on campus at the Harry A. Gampel Pavilion on the main UConn campus in Storrs, and were a member of the Big East Conference. They reached the Sweet Sixteen of the NCAA tournament, and finished the season 25–8 (13–3 Big East).

== Roster ==
2004–05 Connecticut Huskies women's basketball team
Players
Coaches

Pos.	#	Name	Height	Year	Previous school	Hometown
G	2	Ashley Valley	5 ft 9 in (1.75 m)	Sr	Rice Memorial	Colchester, Vermont
G	12	Stacey Marron	5 ft 9 in (1.75 m)	Sr	La Cueva	Albuquerque, New Mexico
G	21	Nicole Wolff	6 ft 0 in (1.83 m)	Jr	Walpole	Walpole, Massachusetts
F	22	Ashley Battle	6 ft 0 in (1.83 m)	RS Sr	The Linsly School	Pittsburgh, Pennsylvania
F/C	23	Willnett Crockett	6 ft 2 in (1.88 m)	Jr	Narbonne	Harbor City, California
G	25	Mel Thomas	5 ft 9 in (1.75 m)	Fr	Mount Notre Dame	Cincinnati, Ohio
C	31	Jessica Moore (C)	6 ft 3 in (1.91 m)	RS Sr	Colony	Palmer, AK
G/F	33	Barbara Turner	6 ft 0 in (1.83 m)	Jr	East Technical	Cleveland, Ohio
G	43	Ann Strother	6 ft 2 in (1.88 m)	Jr	Highlands Ranch	Castle Rock, Colorado

Head coach

Geno Auriemma

Assistant coach(es)

- Chris Dailey
- Jamelle Elliott

Legend

- (C) Team captain
- (S) Suspended
- (I) Ineligible
- (W) Walk-on
- Injured
- Current redshirt

Roster

== Schedule ==
Date time, TV	Rank^{#}	Opponent^{#}	Result	Record	Site (attendance) city, state
Regular season
Nov 19, 2004*	No. 4	Buffalo	W 107–40	1–0	Gampel Pavilion; Storrs, Connecticut
Nov 21, 2004*	No. 4	vs. No. 9 North Carolina; Jimmy V Classic	L 65–71	1–1	Reynolds Coliseum; Raleigh, North Carolina
Dec 1, 2004*	No. 8	USF	W 76–65	2–1	Gampel Pavilion; Storrs, Connecticut
Dec 5, 2004*	No. 8	Holy Cross	W 75–36	3–1	Gampel Pavilion; Storrs, Connecticut
Dec 7, 2004*	No. 8	Hartford	W 55–32	4–1	Gampel Pavilion; Storrs, Connecticut
Dec 21, 2004*	No. 8	at Arizona State	L 50–61	4–2	ASU Activity Center; Tempe, Arizona
Dec 23, 2004*	No. 8	at Colorado State	W 63–44	5–2	Moby Arena; Fort Collins, Colorado
Dec 27, 2004*	No. 8	George Mason	W 76–44	6–2	Gampel Pavilion; Storrs, Connecticut
Dec 29, 2004*	No. 11	No. 10 Michigan State	L 51–67	6–3	Gampel Pavilion; Storrs, Connecticut
Jan 2, 2005	No. 11	at St. John's	W 60–32	7–3 (1–0)	Alumni Hall; New York, New York
Jan 8, 2005*	No. 15	No. 10 Tennessee	L 67–68	8–4	Gampel Pavilion; Storrs, Connecticut
Jan 12, 2005	No. 16	at No. 7 Notre Dame	W 67–50	9–4 (3–0)	Joyce Center; Notre Dame, Indiana
Jan 15, 2005	No. 16	Villanova	W 73–57	10–4 (4–0)	Gampel Pavilion; Storrs, Connecticut
Jan 17, 2005*	No. 13	No. 15 Texas	W 73–57	11–4	Gampel Pavilion; Storrs, Connecticut
Jan 22, 2005	No. 13	Seton Hall	W 64–47	12–4 (5–0)	Gampel Pavilion; Storrs, Connecticut
Jan 26, 2005	No. 9	at Pittsburgh	W 89–53	13–4 (6–0)	Petersen Events Center; Pittsburgh, Pennsylvania
Jan 30, 2005	No. 9	No. 6 Notre Dame	L 59–65	13–5 (6–1)	Gampel Pavilion; Storrs, Connecticut
Feb 3, 2005	No. 11	No. 7 Rutgers	W 57–44	14–5 (7–1)	Gampel Pavilion; Storrs, Connecticut
Feb 5, 2005	No. 11	at Providence	W 71–24	15–5 (8–1)	Dunkin' Donuts Center; Providence, Rhode Island
Feb 5, 2005	No. 11	Boston College	W 80–55	16–5 (9–1)	Gampel Pavilion; Storrs, Connecticut
Feb 13, 2005	No. 10	at No. 11 Rutgers	L 62–76	16–6 (9–2)	Louis Brown Athletic Center; Piscataway, New Jersey
Feb 16, 2005	No. 11	at Georgetown	W 67–49	17–6 (10–2)	McDonough Gymnasium; Washington, D.C.
Feb 19, 2005	No. 11	Syracuse	W 85–49	18–6 (11–2)	Gampel Pavilion; Storrs, Connecticut
Feb 22, 2005	No. 13	Pittsburgh	W 97–49	19–6 (12–2)	Gampel Pavilion; Storrs, Connecticut
Feb 26, 2005	No. 13	at Boston College	L 48–51	19–7 (12–3)	Conte Forum; Chestnut Hill, Massachusetts
Mar 1, 2005	No. 13	at West Virginia	W 71–44	20–7 (13–3)	WVU Coliseum; Morgantown, West Virginia
Big East tournament
Mar 6, 2005*	(3) No. 13	(6) Syracuse; Quarterfinals	W 82–66	21–7	Hartford Civic Center; Hartford, Connecticut
Mar 7, 2005*	(3) No. 13	(2) No. 10 Notre Dame; Semifinals	W 67–54	22–7	Hartford Civic Center; Hartford, Connecticut
Mar 8, 2005*	(3) No. 13	(1) No. 9 Rutgers; Championship game	W 67–51	23–7	Hartford Civic Center; Hartford, Connecticut
NCAA tournament
Mar 20, 2005*	(3 KC) No. 10	(14 KC) Dartmouth; First round	W 95–47	24–7	Gampel Pavilion (8,754); Storrs, Connecticut
Mar 22, 2005*	(3 KC) No. 10	(6 KC) Florida State; Second round	W 70–52	25–7	Gampel Pavilion (6,809); Storrs, Connecticut
Mar 25, 2005*	(3 KC) No. 10	vs. (2 KC) No. 1 Stanford; Regional Semifinal – Sweet Sixteen	L 59–76	25–8	Municipal Auditorium; Kansas City, Missouri
*Non-conference game. ^{#}Rankings from AP Poll. (#) Tournament seedings in parentheses. KC=Kansas City Region. All times are in Eastern Time.

== Rankings ==
Ranking movements Legend: ██ Increase in ranking ██ Decrease in ranking
	Week																			
Poll	Pre	1	2	3	4	5	6	7	8	9	10	11	12	13	14	15	16	17	18	Final
AP	Not released	4	8	8	8	8	8	11	15	16	13	9	11	10	11	11	14	13	10	Not released
Coaches	4	4	8	8	8	8	8	11	14	16	12	10	11	10	11	11	14	11	10	10

== See also ==
- 2004–05 Connecticut Huskies men's basketball team
