= 2004–05 Baylor Lady Bears basketball team =

Intercollegiate basketball season

2004–05 Baylor Lady Bears basketball

NCAA Tournament, National Champions Big 12 Tournament champions Big 12 regular season champions Lady Pirate Invitational champions

National Championship Game, W 84–62 vs. Michigan State
- Conference: Big 12 Conference

Ranking
- Coaches: No. 1
- AP: No. 5
- Record: 33–3 (14–2 Big 12)
- Head coach: Kim Mulkey-Robertson (5th season)
- Associate head coach: Bill Brock
- Assistant coaches: Jennifer Roberts; Johnny Derrick; Michael Snaufer
- Home arena: Ferrell Center

2004–05 Big 12 Conference women's basketball standings
	Conf.				Overall
Team	W		L	PCT	W		L	PCT
No. 5 Baylor †	14	–	2	.875	33	–	3	.917
No. 13 Texas	13	–	3	.813	22	–	9	.710
No. 16 Kansas State	12	–	4	.750	24	–	8	.750
No. 14 Texas Tech	12	–	4	.750	24	–	8	.750
No. 19 Iowa State	12	–	4	.750	23	–	7	.767
Nebraska	8	–	8	.500	18	–	14	.563
Oklahoma	8	–	8	.500	17	–	13	.567
Kansas	5	–	11	.313	12	–	16	.429
Missouri	4	–	12	.250	11	–	18	.379
Texas A&M	4	–	12	.250	16	–	15	.516
Oklahoma State	2	–	14	.125	7	–	20	.259
Colorado	2	–	14	.125	9	–	19	.321
† 2005 Big 12 Tournament winner Rankings from AP poll

The 2004–05 Baylor Lady Bears women's basketball team represented Baylor University during the 2004–05 NCAA Division I women's basketball season. Led by Hall of Fame head coach Kim Mulkey, the team played its home games at the Ferrell Center in Waco, Texas and were members of the Big 12 Conference.

== Roster ==
2004–05 Baylor Bears women's basketball team
Players
Coaches

Pos.	#	Name	Height	Year	Previous school	Hometown
F	45	Steffanie Blackmon	6 ft 2 in (1.88 m)	Sr	Rowlett	Dallas, Texas
G	23	Jordan Davis	5 ft 9 in (1.75 m)	RS Sr	Celina	Celina, Texas
G	5	Chanelle Fox	5 ft 11 in (1.8 m)	RS Jr	Westfield	Houston, Texas
C	25	Melanie Hamerly	6 ft 5 in (1.96 m)	Sr	Little Cypress-Mauriceville	Orange, Texas
G	1	Monique Jones	5 ft 9 in (1.75 m)	So	Ferriday	Ferriday, Louisiana
F	51	Emily Niemann	6 ft 1 in (1.85 m)	So	Westbury Christian	Houston, Texas
G	4	Chisa Ononiwu	5 ft 7 in (1.7 m)	Fr	Westfield	Houston, Texas
G	21	Chameka Scott	6 ft 0 in (1.83 m)	Jr	Clear Brook	Friendswood, Texas
G	20	Angela Tisdale	5 ft 7 in (1.7 m)	Fr	Del Valle High	Austin, Texas
F/C	35	Abiola Wabara	6 ft 0 in (1.83 m)	So	Liceo Scientifico Marconi H.S.	Parma, Italy
G	2	Chelsea Whitaker	5 ft 9 in (1.75 m)	Sr	Skyline (H.S.); Virginia	Dallas, Texas
G	12	LaToya Wyatt	5 ft 7 in (1.7 m)	So	L.D. Bell (H.S.); McLennan C.C.	Fort Worth, Texas
F	33	Sophia Young	6 ft 1 in (1.85 m)	Jr	Evangel Christian Academy	Shreveport, Louisiana

Head coach

- Kim Mulkey-Robertson (Louisiana Tech)

Assistant coach(es)

- Bill Brock (SE Oklahoma State)
- Johnny Derrick
- Jennifer Roberts

Graduate Assistant:

- Michael Snaufer

Legend

- (C) Team captain
- (S) Suspended
- (I) Ineligible
- (W) Walk-on
- Injured
- Current redshirt

== Schedule and results ==
Date time, TV	Rank^{#}	Opponent^{#}	Result	Record	High points	High rebounds	High assists	Site (attendance) city, state
Exhibition
November 5, 2004*		Houston Jaguars	W 99–72		–	–	–	Ferrell Center; Waco, Texas
November 9, 2004*		Basketball Travelers	W 71–51		–	–	–	Ferrell Center; Waco, Texas
Non–Conference Regular Season
November 14, 2004*	No. 8	vs. No. 3 LSU; State Farm Tip-Off Classic	L 70–71	0–1	22 – Blackmon	7 – Blackmon	9 – Whitaker	Frank Erwin Center (7,387); Austin, Texas
November 19, 2004*	No. 8	Indiana	W 60–47	1–1	16 – Young	11 – Young	4 – Scott	Ferrell Center (4,746); Waco, Texas
November 23, 2004*	No. 9	at Mississippi State	W 66–49	2–1	23 – Blackmon	13 – Scott	3 – Young	Humphrey Coliseum (2,031); Starkville, Mississippi
November 26, 2004*	No. 9	Sam Houston State	W 84–53	3–1	16 – Young	11 – Young	7 – Whitaker	Ferrell Center (4,645); Waco, Texas
November 30, 2004*	No. 9	Rice	W 77–65	4–1	23 – Blackmon	13 – Blackmon	5 – Tisdale	Ferrell Center (4,311); Waco, Texas
December 4. 2004*	No. 9	vs. Jackson State; Lady Pirate Invitational – Opening Round	W 73–56	5–1	17 – Blackmon	9 – Blackmon	8 – Tisdale	Minges Coliseum (737); Greenville, North Carolina
December 5, 2004*	No. 9	at East Carolina; Lady Pirate Inviational – Championship Game	W 80–59	6–1	18 – Niemann	9 – Blackmon	6 – Tisdale	Minges Coliseum (707); Greenville, North Carolina
December 11, 2004*	No. 6	Penn State	W 91–70	7–1	25 – Blackmon	9 – Blackmon	7 – Tisdale	Ferrell Center (5,504); Waco, Texas
December 15, 2004*	No. 6	at Washington	W 74–58	8–1	22 – Young	10 – Scott	6 – Whitaker	Edmundson Pavilion (2,611); Seattle, Washington
December 19, 2004*	No. 6	Florida	W 89–62	9–1	15 – Young	14 – Young	7 – Whitaker	Ferrell Center (6,462); Waco, Texas
December 29, 2004*	No. 3	Montana State	W 92–47	10–1	19 – Young	5 – Tied	4 – Tied	Ferrell Center (6,170); Waco, Texas
Big 12 Regular Season
January 5, 2005	No. 3	at Texas A&M	W 64–50	11–1 (1–0)	21 – Young	12 – Young	9 – Tisdale	Reed Arena (4,383); College Station, Texas
January 8, 2005	No. 2	No. 7 Texas	W 63–60	12–1 (2–0)	25 – Young	15 – Young	4 – Whitaker	Ferrell Center (10,322); Waco, Texas
January 12, 2005	No. 2	at Nebraska	L 99–103 ^{3OT}	12–2 (2–1)	29 – Young	14 – Young	9 – Whitaker	Devaney Center (3,192); Lincoln, Nebraska
January 16, 2005	No. 2	Oklahoma	W 78–68	13–2 (3–1)	16 – Niemann	9 – Blackmon	4 – Tisdale	Ferrell Center (7,640); Waco, Texas
January 22, 2005	No. 4	at No. 15 Texas	L 55–69	13–3 (3–2)	13 – Tied	12 – Young	4 – Whitaker	Frank Erwin Center (8,400); Austin, Texas
January 26, 2005	No. 7	Texas A&M	W 74–52	14–3 (4–2)	20 – Young	9 – Young	7 – Whitaker	Ferrell Center (7,470); Waco, Texas
January 29, 2005	No. 7	at Oklahoma State	W 67–65	15–3 (5–2)	19 – Niemann	9 – Blackmon	5 – Young	Gallagher-Iba Arena (3,072); Stillwater, Oklahoma
February 2, 2005	No. 8	No. 15 Kansas State	W 72–62	16–3 (6–2)	21 – Blackmon	13 – Young	3 – Whitaker	Ferrell Center (6,592); Waco, Texas
February 5, 2005	No. 8	at No. 12 Texas Tech	W 52–49	17–3 (7–2)	24 – Young	11 – Blackmon	7 – Whitaker	United Spirit Arena (15,050); Lubbock, Texas
February 9, 2005	No. 7	at Oklahoma	W 73–72	18–3 (8–2)	21 – Young	8 – Blackmon	6 – Whitaker	Lloyd Noble Center (5,788); Norman, Oklahoma
February 12, 2005	No. 7	Oklahoma State	W 87–51	19–3 (9–2)	24 – Young	12 – Blackmon	7 – Whitaker	Ferrell Center (6,667); Waco, Texas
February 16, 2005	No. 7	Missoui	W 74–57	20–3 (10–2)	31 – Blackmon	11 – Blackmon	8 – Whitaker	Ferrell Center (6,095); Waco, Texas
February 19, 2005	No. 7	No. 19 Iowa State	W 82–77	21–3 (11–2)	22 – Blackmon	11 – Young	8 – Young	Ferrell Center (8,514); Waco, Texas
February 23, 2005	No. 6	at Kansas	W 70–60	22–3 (12–2)	20 – Blackmon	9 – Young	6 – Whitaker	Allen Fieldhouse (1,492); Lawrence, Kansas
February 26, 2005	No. 6	at Colorado	W 84–65	23–3 (13–2)	20 – Niemann	8 – Tied	8 – Whitaker	Coors Events Center (3,057); Boulder, Colorado
March 3, 2005	No. 7	No. 13 Texas Tech	W 79–69	24–3 (14–2)	17 – Blackmon	12 – Young	8 – Whitaker	Ferrell Center (10,550); Waco, Texas
Big 12 Tournament
March 9, 2005*	(1) No. 6	vs. (9) Missouri; Quarterfinal	W 70–52	25–3	18 – Young	9 – Tied	10 – Whitaker	Municipal Auditorium (5,119); Kansas City, Missouri
March 10, 2005*	(1) No. 6	vs. (4) No. 14 Texas Tech; Semifinal	W 58–57	26–3	18 – Young	13 – Young	8 – Young	Municipal Auditorium (4,068); Kansas City, Missouri
March 12, 2005*	(1) No. 6	vs. (3) No. 17 Kansas State; Championship	W 68–55	27–3	18 – Young	14 – Blackmon	8 – Whitaker	Municipal Auditorium (6,108); Kansas City, Missouri
NCAA Tournament
March 17, 2005*; 1:00 pm, ESPN2	(2 W) No. 5	vs. (15 W) Illinois State; First Round	W 91–70	28–3	21 – Young	7 – Blackmon	5 – Blackmon	Edmundson Pavilion (3.094); Seattle, Washington
March 19, 2005*; 8:00 pm, ESPN2	(2 W) No. 5	vs. (10 W) Oregon; Second Round	W 69–46	29–3	25 – Young	8 – Young	4 – Scott	Edmundson Pavilion (3,010); Seattle, Washington
March 25, 2005*; 8:00 pm, ESPN	(2 W) No. 5	vs. (3 W) No. 12 Minnesota; Sweet Sixteen	W 64–57	30–3	26 – Young	7 – Tied	4 – Tied	Wells Fargo Arena (8,213); Tempe, Arizona
March 27, 2005*; 6:00 pm, ESPN	(2 W) No. 5	vs. (1 W) No. 4 North Carolina; Elite Eight	W 72–63	31–3	19 – Young	11 – Young	6 – Young	Wells Fargo Arena (3,213); Tempe, Arizona
April 3, 2005*; 6:00 pm, ESPN	(2 W) No. 5	vs. (1 S) No. 2 LSU; Final Four	W 68–57	32–3	21 – Young	10 – Young	6 – Young	RCA Dome (28,937); Indianapolis, Indiana
April 5, 2005*; 7:45 pm, ESPN	(2 W) No. 5	vs. (1 MW) No. 6 Michigan State; National Championship Game	W 84–62	33–3	26 – Young	9 – Young	6 – Whitaker	RCA Dome (28,937); Indianapolis, Indiana
*Non-conference game. ^{#}Rankings from AP Poll. (#) Tournament seedings in parentheses. All times are in Central Time. W = West, S = South, MW = Mid-West.

== See also ==
- 2004–05 Baylor Bears basketball team
