= 2004–05 Michigan State Spartans women's basketball team =

Intercollegiate basketball season

2004–05 Michigan State Spartans women's basketball

Big Ten Regular season champions Big Ten Tournament champions Spartan Classic Champions

NCAA Tournament, Runner-up
- Conference: Big Ten Conference

Ranking
- Coaches: No. 2
- AP: No. 6
- Record: 33–4 (14–2 Big Ten)
- Head coach: Joanne Palombo-McCallie (5th season)
- Assistant coach: AnnMarie Gilbert
- Home arena: Breslin Center

2004–05 Big Ten women's basketball standings
| | Conf. | | | | Overall |
| Team | W | | L | PCT | W | | L | PCT |
|---|---|---|---|---|---|---|---|---|
| No. 6 Michigan State † | 14 | – | 2 | .875 | 33 | – | 4 | .892 |
| No. 8 Ohio State | 14 | – | 2 | .875 | 30 | – | 5 | .857 |
| No. 22 Penn State | 13 | – | 3 | .813 | 19 | – | 11 | .633 |
| No. 12 Minnesota | 12 | – | 4 | .750 | 26 | – | 8 | .765 |
| Purdue | 9 | – | 7 | .563 | 17 | – | 13 | .567 |
| Iowa | 8 | – | 8 | .500 | 23 | – | 10 | .697 |
| Illinois | 7 | – | 9 | .438 | 17 | – | 13 | .567 |
| Wisconsin | 5 | – | 11 | .313 | 12 | – | 16 | .429 |
| Indiana | 3 | – | 13 | .188 | 10 | – | 18 | .357 |
| Northwestern | 2 | – | 14 | .125 | 5 | – | 25 | .167 |
| Michigan | 1 | – | 15 | .063 | 5 | – | 23 | .179 |
† 2005 Big Ten tournament winner Rankings from AP Poll

The 2004–05 Michigan State Spartans women's basketball team represented Michigan State University during the 2004–05 women's college basketball season. The Spartans, led by fifth-year head coach Joanne P. McCallie, played their home games at the Breslin Center and were members of the Big Ten Conference. They finished the season 33–4, 14–2 in Big Ten play to win the regular season title. They also won the Big Ten women's tournament to receive the conference's automatic bid to the NCAA tournament. Playing as the No. 1 seed in the Kansas City region (KC), the Spartans defeated Alcorn State, USC, Vanderbilt, and Stanford to reach the Final Four for the first time in program history. In the National Semifinal round, the Spartans defeated perennial power Tennessee, 68–64. Michigan State was beaten by Baylor, 84–62, in the National championship game.

== Roster ==
2004–05 Michigan State Spartans women's basketball team
Players
Coaches

| Pos. | # | Name | Height | Year | Previous school | Hometown |
|---|---|---|---|---|---|---|
| G | 4 | Kristin Haynie | 5 ft 6 in (1.68 m) | Sr | Mason H.S. | Mason, Michigan |
| G | 20 | Lindsay Bowen | 5 ft 7 in (1.7 m) | Jr | Dansville H.S. | Dansville, Michigan |
| G | 24 | Rene Haynes | 5 ft 10 in (1.78 m) | So | Wellington School | Columbus, Ohio |
| C | 42 | Kelli Roehrig | 6 ft 4 in (1.93 m) | Sr | LaVista Senior High | Papillion, Nebraska |
| F | 52 | Liz Shimek | 6 ft 1 in (1.85 m) | Jr | Glen Lake | Maple City, Michigan |
| G | 31 | Victoria Lucas-Perry | 5 ft 9 in (1.75 m) | So | Powers Catholic | Flint, Michigan |
| F | 44 | Katrina Grantham | 6 ft 1 in (1.85 m) | So | Saginaw Heritage | Saginaw, Michigan |
| F | 45 | Myisha Bannister | 6 ft 3 in (1.91 m) | So | Villa Angela-St. Joseph | Cleveland, Ohio |
| G | 13 | Courtney Davidson | 5 ft 4 in (1.63 m) | Fr | Ursuline | Youngstown, Ohio |
| G | 24 | Maggie Dwyer | 6 ft 1 in (1.85 m) | Fr | Grand Haven H.S. | Grand Haven, Michigan |
| C | 54 | Laura Hall | 6 ft 3 in (1.91 m) | Fr | Bedford Senior High | Temperance, Michigan |
| F | 32 | Melanie Small | 5 ft 10 in (1.78 m) | Fr | Copley H.S. | Copley, Ohio |
| G | 23 | Danielle Doneth | 5 ft 5 in (1.65 m) | Fr | Lansing Catholic | East Lansing, Michigan |

Head coach

- Joanne P. McCallie (Northwestern)

Assistant coach(es)

- AnnMarie Gilbert (Oberlin)

Legend

- (C) Team captain
- (S) Suspended
- (I) Ineligible
- (W) Walk-on
- Injured
- Current redshirt

== Schedule and results ==
| Date time, TV | Rank^{#} | Opponent^{#} | Result | Record | High points | High rebounds | High assists | Site city, state |
Non–Conference Regular Season
| November 20, 2004* | No. 15 | Central Connecticut State; Spartan Classic – Opening Round | W 77–42 | 1–0 | 16 – Shimek | 8 – Shimek | 5 – Haynie | Breslin Center; East Lansing, Michigan |
| November 21, 2004* | No. 15 | Boston College; Spartan Classic – Championship Game | W 82–78 ^{OT} | 2–0 | 19 – Tied | 11 – Shimek | 4 – Haynie | Breslin Center (3,235); East Lansing, Michigan |
| November 26, 2004* | No. 13 | vs. Utah; Rainbow Wahine Classic – Opening Round | W 56–54 | 3–0 | 15 – Shimek | 9 – Roehrig | 5 – Haynie | Stan Sheriff Center; Honolulu, Hawai'i |
| November 27, 2004* | No. 13 | vs. Santa Clara; Rainbow Wahine Classic – Semifinals | W 81–59 | 4–0 | 23 – Roehrig | 12 – Roehrig | 4 – Haynes | Stan Sheriff Center; Honolulu, Hawai'i |
| November 28, 2004* | No. 13 | vs. TCU; Rainbow Wahine Classic – Championship Game | L 75–80 | 4–1 | 33 – Bowen | 12 – Roehrig | 7 – Haynie | Stan Sheriff Center (1,014); Honolulu, Hawai'i |
| December 02, 2004*; 7:00 pm, CSTV | No. 15 | No. 3 Notre Dame | W 82–73 ^{OT} | 5–1 | 23 – Bowen | 13 – Shimek | 5 – Haynie | Joyce Center (5,544); South Bend, Indiana |
| December 04, 2004* | No. 15 | at Cincinnati | W 77–61 | 6–1 | 28 – Bowen | 12 – Roehrig | 4 – Haynie | Fifth Third Arena (475); Cincinnati, Ohio |
| December 09, 2004* | No. 12 | Eastern Illinois | W 85–45 | 7–1 | 18 – Haynes | 8 – Tied | 7 – Lucas-Perry | Breslin Center (2,858); East Lansing, Michigan |
| December 11, 2004* | No. 12 | at Detroit Mercy | W 73–64 | 8–1 | 19 – Roehrig | 11 – Roehrig | 5 – Bowen | Calihan Hall (407); Detroit, Michigan |
| December 19, 2004* | No. 11 | Texas A&M–Corpus Christi | W 62–56 | 9–1 | 25 – Shimek | 15 – Shimek | 6 – Haynie | Breslin Center (3,410); East Lansing, Michigan |
| December 21, 2004* | No. 11 | Vermont | W 85–57 | 10–1 | 23 – Roehrig | 8 – Tied | 9 – Haynie | Breslin Center (11,721); East Lansing, Michigan |
| December 29, 2004* | No. 10 | at No. 11 UConn | W 67–51 | 11–1 | 21 – Bowen | 9 – Shimek | 4 – Tied | Hartford Civic Center (16,294); Hartford, Connecticut |
Big Ten Regular Season
| January 02, 2005; 2:00 pm, Comcast Local (Detroit) | No. 6 | at Michigan | W 70–60 | 12–1 (1–0) | 16 – Bowen | 14 – Shimek | 7 – Haynie | Crisler Arena (4,123); Ann Arbor, Michigan |
| January 06, 2005; 8:00 pm, FSN Chicago | No. 6 | at No. 9 Ohio State | L 54–68 | 12–2 (1–1) | 17 – Shimek | 10 – Tied | 4 – Haynie | Value City Arena (3,301); Columbus, Ohio |
| January 09, 2005; 2:00 pm, Comcast Cable/Lansing | No. 9 | Iowa | W 68–56 | 13–2 (2–1) | 17 – Bowen | 10 – Shimek | 4 – Haynie | Breslin Center (8,152); East Lansing, Michigan |
| January 13, 2005; 7:00 pm, Comcast Cable/Lansing | No. 9 | Wisconsin | W 74–66 | 14–2 (3–1) | 22 – Shimek | 9 – Shimek | 5 – Haynie | Breslin Center (3,959); East Lansing, Michigan |
| January 16, 2005; 1:00 pm, FSN Chicago | No. 9 | No. 11 Minnesota | W 62–49 | 15–2 (4–1) | 20 – Bowen | 9 – Roehrig | 5 – Haynie | Breslin Center (5,218); East Lansing, Michigan |
| January 19, 2005 | No. 8 | at Illinois | W 62–42 | 16–2 (5–1) | 13 – Roehrig | 11 – Roehrig | 6 – Haynie | Assembly Hall (1,437); Champaign, Illinois |
| January 23, 2005; 1:00 pm, FSN Chicago | No. 8 | at No. 22 Penn State | L 56–73 | 16–3 (5–2) | 13 – Bowen | 10 – Roehrig | 4 – Haynie | Bryce Jordan Center (9,530); University Park, Pennsylvania |
| January 26, 2005; 7:00 pm, Comcast Cable/Lansing | No. 11 | Purdue | W 71–58 | 17–3 (6–2) | 20 – Roehrig | 10 – Shimek | 9 – Haynie | Breslin Center (3,979); East Lansing, Michigan |
| January 30, 2005 | No. 11 | at Indiana | W 52–40 | 18–3 (7–2) | 13 – Tied | 14 – Haynie | 3 – Haynie | Simon Skjodt Assembly Hall (3,022); Bloomington, Indiana |
| February 03, 2005; 8:00 pm, FSN Detroit | No. 10 | Northwestern | W 101–40 | 19–3 (8–2) | 25 – Lucas-Perry | 12 – Roehrig | 8 – Haynie | Breslin Center (4,876); East Lansing, Michigan |
| February 06, 2005; 2:00 pm, Comcast Cable/Lansing | No. 10 | Illinois | W 68–59 | 20–3 (9–2) | 21 – Shimek | 9 – Tied | 5 – Shimek | Breslin Center (6,284); East Lansing, Michigan |
| February 10, 2005 | No. 9 | at Minnesota | W 79–48 | 21–3 (10–2) | 22 – Haynes | 10 – Shimek | 4 – Tied | Williams Arena (8,768); Minneapolis, Minnesota |
| February 13, 2005 | No. 9 | at Wisconsin | W 84–60 | 22–3 (11–2) | 18 – Bowen | 9 – Shimek | 7 – Haynie | Kohl Center (9,831); Madison, Wisconsin |
| February 17, 2005 | No. 9 | at Iowa | W 67–60 | 23–3 (12–2) | 20 – Shimek | 13 – Shimek | 6 – Haynie | Carver–Hawkeye Arena (3,659); Iowa City, Iowa |
| February 20, 2005; 2:00 pm, ESPN2 | No. 9 | No. 2 Ohio State | W 66–64 | 24–3 (13–2) | 19 – Haynie | 9 – Tied | 9 – Haynie | Breslin Center (14,066); East Lansing, Michigan |
| February 23, 2005; 7:00 pm, Comcast Local (Detroit) | No. 8 | Michigan; Rivalry Game | W 77–34 | 25–3 (14–2) | 21 – Roehrig | 10 – Roehrig | 4 – Tied | Breslin Center (8,904); East Lansing, Michigan |
Big Ten Tournament
| March 04, 2005*; 6:05 pm, Fox Sports Net | (2) No. 8 | vs. (7) Illinois; Quarterfinals | W 61–50 ^{OT} | 26–3 | 15 – Roehrig | 11 – Roehrig | 4 – Shimek | Conseco Fieldhouse; Indianapolis, Indiana |
| March 06, 2005*; 6:00 pm, Fox Sports Net | (2) No. 8 | vs. (2) No. 23 Penn State; Semifinals | W 83–76 | 27–3 | 19 – Roehrig | 7 – Roehrig | 5 – Haynie | Conseco Fieldhouse; Indianapolis, Indiana |
| March 07, 2005*; 7:00 pm, ESPN2 | (2) No. 7 | vs. (4) No. 12 Minnesota; Championship Game | W 55–49 | 28–3 | 15 – Shimek | 8 – Shimek | 3 – Tied | Conseco Fieldhouse; Indianapolis, Indiana |
NCAA Tournament
| March 19, 2005*; 2:30 pm, ESPN2 | (1 MW) No. 6 | vs. (16 MW) Alcorn State; First Round | W 73–41 | 29–3 | 18 – Shimek | 13 – Shimek | 7 – Bowen | Williams Arena (7,410); Minneapolis, Minnesota |
| March 21, 2005*; 7:00 pm, ESPN | (1 MW) No. 6 | vs. (8 MW) USC; Second Round | W 61–59 | 30–3 | 19 – Bowen | 8 – Haynie | 7 – Haynie | Williams Arena; Minneapolis, Minnesota |
| March 27, 2005*; 7:30 pm, ESPN2 | (1 MW) No. 6 | vs. (5 MW) No. 18 Vanderbilt; Sweet Sixteen | W 76–64 | 31–3 | 18 – Roehrig | 11 – Shimek | 10 – Haynie | Municipal Auditorium; Kansas City, Missouri |
| March 29, 2005*; 7:00 pm, ESPN | (1 MW) No. 6 | vs. (2 MW) No. 1 Stanford; Elite Eight | W 76–69 | 32–3 | 24 – Shimek | 10 – Shimek | 7 – Haynie | Municipal Auditorium (2,475); Kansas City, Missouri |
| April 03, 2005*; 9:30 pm, ESPN | (1 MW) No. 6 | vs. (1 E) No. 3 Tennessee; Final Four | W 68–64 | 33–3 | 18 – Bowen | 11 – Shimek | 7 – Haynie | RCA Dome (28,937); Indianapolis, Indiana |
| April 05, 2005*; 8:45 pm, ESPN | (1 MW) No. 6 | vs. (2 W) No. 5 Baylor; National Championship Game | L 62–84 | 33–4 | 20 – Bowen | 5 – Tied | 5 – Haynie | RCA Dome (28,937); Indianapolis, Indiana |
*Non-conference game. ^{#}Rankings from AP Poll. (#) Tournament seedings in parentheses. All times are in Eastern Time. MW = Mid-West, E = East, W = West.

== See also ==
2004–05 Michigan State Spartans men's basketball team
