= 2012–13 Baylor Lady Bears basketball team =

Intercollegiate basketball season

2012–13 Baylor Lady Bears basketball

Big 12 Regular Season & Tournament Champions

NCAA tournament, Sweet Sixteen
- Conference: Big 12 Conference

Ranking
- Coaches: No. 1
- AP: No. 1
- Record: 34–2 (18–0 Big 12)
- Head coach: Kim Mulkey (13th season)
- Assistant coaches: Bill Brock; Damion McKinney; Rekha Patterson
- Home arena: Ferrell Center

2012–13 Big 12 Conference women's basketball standings
	Conf.				Overall
Team	W		L	PCT	W		L	PCT
No. 1 Baylor †	18	–	0	1.000	34	–	2	.944
No. 23 Iowa State	12	–	6	.667	24	–	9	.727
Oklahoma	11	–	7	.611	24	–	11	.686
Texas Tech	11	–	7	.611	21	–	11	.656
Oklahoma State	9	–	9	.500	22	–	11	.667
West Virginia	9	–	9	.500	17	–	14	.548
Kansas	8	–	10	.444	20	–	14	.588
Kansas State	5	–	13	.278	19	–	18	.514
Texas	5	–	13	.278	12	–	18	.400
TCU	2	–	16	.111	9	–	21	.300
† 2013 Big 12 Tournament winner Rankings from AP poll

The 2012–13 Baylor Lady Bears basketball team represented Baylor University in the 2012–13 NCAA Division I women's basketball season. The Lady Bears were led by 13th season head coach Hall of Famer Kim Mulkey, with the team playing its home games at the Ferrell Center in Waco, Texas as members of the Big 12 Conference.

The Lady Bears began the season as the preseason #1 team in both the Associated Press and the Coaches' Poll after they finished the 2011-2012 through the season undefeated, winning the Big 12 regular season, Big 12 Tournament and the National Championship with a 40–0 record. Baylor returned all five starters and welcomed a freshman class of four players.

== Roster ==
2012–13 Baylor Bears women's basketball team
Players
Coaches

Pos.	#	Name	Height	Year	Hometown
F	22	Sune Agbuke	6 ft 4 in (1.93 m)	—	So	San Antonio, Texas
F	11	Mariah Chandler	6 ft 2 in (1.88 m)	—	RS Jr	Atlanta, Georgia
F	13	Chardonae Fuqua'	6 ft 0 in (1.83 m)	—	Fr	Birmingham, Alabama
F	42	Brittney Griner	6 ft 8 in (2.03 m)	—	Sr	Houston, Texas
G	1	Kimetria Hayden	6 ft 0 in (1.83 m)	—	Sr	Dallas, Texas
F	44	Kristina Higgins	6 ft 5 in (1.96 m)	—	Fr	El Paso, Texas
G	2	Niya Johnson	5 ft 8 in (1.73 m)	—	Fr	Gainesville, Florida
G	3	Jordan Madden	6 ft 0 in (1.83 m)	—	Sr	Lepanto, Arkansas
F	32	Brooklyn Pope	6 ft 1 in (1.85 m)	—	GS	Fort Worth, Texas
G	12	Alexis Prince	6 ft 1 in (1.85 m)	—	Fr	Orlando, Florida
G	14	Makenzie Robertson	5 ft 9 in (1.75 m)	—	Jr	McGregor, Texas
G	0	Odyssey Sims	5 ft 8 in (1.73 m)	—	Jr	Irving, Texas
F	10	Destiny Williams	6 ft 1 in (1.85 m)	—	RS Sr	Benton Harbor, Michigan

Head coach

Kim Mulkey

Assistant coach(es)

Bill Brock
Damion McKinney
Rekha Patterson

Legend

- (C) Team captain
- (S) Suspended
- (I) Ineligible
- (W) Walk-on
- Injured
- Current redshirt

Roster
Last update: 2012-11-15

== Schedule ==
Date time, TV	Rank^{#}	Opponent^{#}	Result	Record	Site (attendance) city, state
Exhibition
10/30/2012*; 7:00 pm	No. 1	Oklahoma City	W 91-42	1-0	Ferrell Center (7,622); Waco, TX
11/05/2012*; 7:00 pm	No. 1	Tarleton State	W 92-49	2-0	Ferrell Center (7,622); Waco, TX
Regular Season
11/09/2012*; 12:00 pm, FSSW/FCS Central	No. 1	Lamar	W 80-34	1-0	Ferrell Center (8,158); Waco, TX
11/13/2012*; 5:00 pm, ESPN2	No. 1	No. 6 Kentucky; State Farm Tipoff	W 85-51	2-0	Ferrell Center (8,538); Waco, TX
11/16/2012*; 6:30 pm	No. 1	vs. No. 4 Stanford; Rainbow Wahine Classic	L 69–71	2–1	Stan Sheriff Center (2,092); Honolulu, HI
11/17/2012*; 8:30 pm	No. 1	vs. Tennessee-Martin; Rainbow Wahine Classic	W 82-67	3-1	Stan Sheriff Center (1,832); Honolulu, HI
11/18/2012*; 6:30 pm, OC Sports	No. 1	at Hawaii; Rainbow Wahine Classic	W 77-42	4-1	Stan Sheriff Center (2,319); Honolulu, HI
11/23/2012*; 7:00 pm	No. 3	Liberty	W 92-60	5-1	Ferrell Center (8,420); Waco, TX
11/27/2012*; 7:00 pm	No. 3	at Rice	W 89-49	6-1	Tudor Fieldhouse (2,318); Houston, TX
12/05/2012*; 6:00 pm, ESPN2	No. 3	at No. 5 Notre Dame	W 73-61	7-1	Edmund P. Joyce Center (9,149); South Bend, IN
12/12/2012*; 6:00 pm, FSSW+/FCS Central	No. 3	Oral Roberts	W 94-56	8-1	Ferrell Center (7,767); Waco, TX
12/18/2012*; 7:00 pm, ESPN	No. 3	No. 10 Tennessee	W 76-53	9-1	Ferrell Center (9,249); Waco, TX
12/29/2012*; 7:00 pm	No. 3	Southeastern Louisiana	W 106-41	10-1	Ferrell Center (8,864); Waco, TX
01/02/2013; 7:00 pm, FSSW+/FCS Pacific	No. 2	at TCU	W 74-35	11-1 (1-0)	Daniel–Meyer Coliseum (7,394); Fort Worth, TX
01/06/2013; 4:30 pm, FSN/FCS Central	No. 3	No. 13 Oklahoma State	W 83-49	12-1 (2-0)	Ferrell Center (8,549); Waco, TX
01/09/2013; 7:00 pm, FSSW/FCS Central	No. 1	No. 25 Iowa State	W 67-39	13-1 (3-0)	Ferrell Center (8,008); Waco, TX
01/13/2013; 1:30 pm, FSN/FCS Atlantic	No. 1	at No. 17 Kansas	W 82-60	14-1 (4-0)	Allen Fieldhouse (6,923); Lawrence, KS
01/16/2013; 7:00 pm, FSMW/FCS Central	No. 1	at Kansas State	W 90-69	15-1 (5-0)	Bramlage Coliseum (3,591); Manhattan, KS
01/19/2013; 7:00 pm, FSSW+/FCS Pacific	No. 1	West Virginia	W 76-58	16-1 (6-0)	Ferrell Center (10,254); Waco, TX
01/23/2013; 7:00 pm, MC22	No. 1	at No. 24 Iowa State	W 66-51	17-1 (7-0)	Hilton Coliseum (11,220); Ames, IA
01/26/2013; 11:00 am, FSN/FCS Central	No. 1	No. 20 Oklahoma	W 82-65	18-1 (8-0)	Ferrell Center (10,419); Waco, TX
01/30/2013; 7:00 pm	No. 1	at Texas Tech	W 90-60	19-1 (9-0)	United Spirit Arena (12,871); Lubbock, TX
02/02/2013; 7:00 pm, FSSW+/FCS Pacific	No. 1	at No. 19 Oklahoma State	W 81-62	20-1 (10-0)	Gallagher-Iba Arena (2,829); Stillwater, OK
02/06/2013; 7:00 pm	No. 1	Kansas	W 86-45	21-1 (11-0)	Ferrell Center (8,289); Waco, TX
02/09/2013; 7:00 pm, LHN	No. 1	at Texas	W 75-48	22-1 (12-0)	Frank Erwin Center (9,192); Austin, TX
02/12/2013; 6:00 pm, FSSW	No. 1	Texas Tech	W 89-47	23-1 (13-0)	Ferrell Center (8,538); Waco, TX
02/16/2013; 1:00 pm	No. 1	TCU	W 78-45	24-1 (14-0)	Ferrell Center (10,258); Waco, TX
02/18/2013*; 8:00 pm, ESPN2	No. 1	at No. 3 Connecticut; Play 4 Kay	W 76-70	25-1 (14-0)	XL Center (16,294); Hartford, CT
02/23/2013; 12:00 pm, FSSW	No. 1	Texas	W 67-47	26-1 (15-0)	Ferrell Center (10,592); Waco, TX
02/25/2013; 6:00 pm, ESPN2	No. 1	at Oklahoma	W 86-64	27-1 (16-0)	Lloyd Noble Center (6,138); Norman, OK
03/02/2013; 6:00 pm, FSN	No. 1	at West Virginia	W 80-49	28-1 (17-0)	WVU Coliseum (13,447); Morgantown, WV
03/04/2013; 7:00 pm, FSN	No. 1	Kansas State	W 90-68	29-1 (18-0)	Ferrell Center (10,627); Waco, TX
2013 Big 12 Conference women's basketball tournament
03/09/2013; 1:30 pm, FSN	No. 1	vs. Kansas State; Big 12 Quarterfinals	W 80-47	30-1 (18-0)	American Airlines Center (7,311); Dallas, TX
03/10/2013; 1:00 pm, FSN	No. 1	vs. Oklahoma State; Big 12 Semifinals	W 77-69	31-1 (18-0)	American Airlines Center; Dallas, TX
03/11/2013; 7:00 pm, FSN	No. 1	vs. No. 23 Iowa State; Big 12 Finals	W 75-47	32-1 (18-0)	American Airlines Center (8,662); Dallas, TX
2013 NCAA tournament
03/24/2013*; 6:30 pm, ESPN2	(1 OKC) No. 1	(16 OKC) Prairie View A&M; NCAA First Round	W 82-42	33-1 (18-0)	Ferrell Center (-); Waco, TX
03/26/2013*; 8:30 pm, ESPN2	(1 OKC) No. 1	(8 OKC) No. 25 Florida State; NCAA Second Round	W 85-47	34-1 (18-0)	Ferrell Center (9,652); Waco, TX
03/31/2013*; 6:30 pm, ESPN2	(1 OKC) No. 1	(5 OKC) No. 16 Louisville; NCAA Sweet 16	L 81-82	34-2 (18-0)	Chesapeake Energy Arena (9,162); Oklahoma City, OK
*Non-conference game. ^{#}Rankings from AP Poll. (#) Tournament seedings in parentheses. OKC=Oklahoma City. All times are in Central Time.

== See also ==
- 2012–13 Baylor Bears basketball team
