= Sophia Young =

American basketball player (born 1983)

Sophia Young-Malcolm
Personal information
- Born: December 15, 1983 (age 42) Saint Vincent, West Indies
- Listed height: 6 ft 1 in (1.85 m)
- Listed weight: 165 lb (75 kg)

Career information
- High school: Evangel Christian Academy (Shreveport, Louisiana)
- College: Baylor (2002–2006)
- WNBA draft: 2006: 1st round, 4th overall pick
- Drafted by: San Antonio Silver Stars
- Playing career: 2006–2015
- Position: Small forward

Career history
- 2006–2015: San Antonio Stars
- 2006–2007: Gambrinus Sika Brno
- 2007–2010: Galatasaray
- 2010–2011: Cras Taranto
- 2012–2013: Beijing Great Wall

Career highlights
- 3× WNBA All-Star (2006, 2007, 2009); All-WNBA Second Team (2012); WNBA All-Defensive First Team (2008); All-WNBA First Team (2008); 3× All-WNBA Second Team (2007, 2009, 2012); WNBA All-Rookie Team (2006); NCAA champion (2005); NCAA Tournament MOP (2005); First-team All-American – AP (2006); Second-team All-American – AP (2005); 2× All-American – Kodak, USBWA (2005, 2006); Big 12 Player of the Year (2006); Big 12 All-Defensive Team (2006); Big 12 Tournament Most Outstanding Player (2005); 3× First-team All-Big 12 (2004–2006)
- Stats at WNBA.com
- Stats at Basketball Reference

Sophia Yvonne Ashley Young-Malcolm (born December 15, 1983) is a Vincentian-American former professional women's basketball player. She played with the San Antonio Stars in the Women's National Basketball Association (WNBA). Young-Malcolm has since been inducted into the Baylor Athletics Hall of Fame and the Texas Sports Hall of Fame.

== High school years ==
She was born on Saint Vincent, West Indies. Young attended the Evangel Christian Academy in Shreveport, Louisiana, United States.

== College career ==
Young was an All-American at Baylor University and helped lead the team, nicknamed the Lady Bears, to their first national championship during the 2005 NCAA Division I women's basketball tournament, defeating Michigan State University. She is one of only four women in NCAA history to score 2,000 points, grab 1,000 rebounds, collect 300 steals, as well as dish out 300 assists.

- Big 12 10th Anniversary Team (only active player named to the five person squad)
- Big 12 Player of the Year
- Kodak All-American (second straight year)
- AP All-American (first team)
- USBWA All-American (second straight year)
- All-Tournament team Albuquerque Regional
- Big 12 Championship All-Tournament team (third straight year)
- Wooden Award Finalist
- Wade Trophy Finalist
- Naismith Trophy Watch List
- All-Big 12 first team (third straight year)
- All-Big 12 Defensive team
- Bayer Senior CLASS Award Finalist
- Big 12 Player of the Week (three-time)
- Big 12 Commissioner's Honor Roll (4.0 GPA)

== College statistics ==
Legend
GP	Games played	GS	Games started	MPG	Minutes per game	RPG	Rebounds per game
APG	Assists per game	SPG	Steals per game	BPG	Blocks per game	PPG	Points per game
TO	Turnovers per game	FG%	Field-goal percentage	3P%	3-point field-goal percentage	FT%	Free-throw percentage
**Bold**	Career best	°	League leader

Year	Team	GP	Points	FG%	3P%	FT%	RPG	APG	SPG	BPG	PPG
2002–03	Baylor	35	497	**56.3**	-	54.0	**10.0**	1.6	2.5	**1.2**	14.2
2003–04	Baylor	35	586	55.5	-	60.7	8.6	2.1	2.5	0.8	16.7
2004–05	Baylor	**36**	661	52.6	-	**70.5**	9.3	**2.9**	1.9	0.7	18.4
2005–06	Baylor	33	**736**	54.6	-	**70.5**	**10.0**	2.1	2.2	1.0	**22.3**°
Career	Baylor	139	2480	54.6	0.0	65.3	9.5	2.2	2.3	0.9	17.8

== WNBA career ==
Young was selected as the fourth overall pick in the 2006 WNBA draft by the San Antonio Silver Stars. During her nine-year career, all with the Stars, she was named to the Western Conference WNBA All-Star team three times.

In 2015, Young announced her retirement from the WNBA .

== USA Basketball ==
Young was one of 21 finalists for the U.S. Women's Olympic Basketball Team Roster for the 2010-2012 cycle. The 20 professional women's basketball players, plus one collegiate player (Brittney Griner), were selected by the USA Basketball Women's National Team Player Selection Committee to compete for the final roster which will represent the US at the 2012 Olympics in London. Young was named to the National team training pool again for the 2014-2016 cycle on 13 January 2014.

== WNBA career statistics ==
Legend
GP	Games played	GS	Games started	MPG	Minutes per game	RPG	Rebounds per game
APG	Assists per game	SPG	Steals per game	BPG	Blocks per game	PPG	Points per game
TO	Turnovers per game	FG%	Field-goal percentage	3P%	3-point field-goal percentage	FT%	Free-throw percentage
**Bold**	Career best	°	League leader

=== Regular season ===
Year	Team	GP	GS	MPG	FG%	3P%	FT%	RPG	APG	SPG	BPG	TO	PPG
2006	San Antonio	**34**	**34**	31.1	.416	.000	.730	**7.6**	1.5	1.7	0.4	1.32	12.0
2007	San Antonio	33	33	33.5	.478	.000	.749	5.8	1.5	1.5	0.4	1.85	16.8
2008	San Antonio	33	33	31.9	.478	.000	**.786**	5.6	2.3	1.6	**0.5**	1.73	17.5
2009	San Antonio	33	33	**33.7**	.454	**.309**	.767	6.5	1.6	1.3	**0.5**	1.88	**18.2**
2010	San Antonio	**34**	**34**	31.8	.501	.263	.658	5.2	**2.4**	1.6	0.3	2.06	15.3
2011	San Antonio	33	33	31.6	.429	.000	.592	6.4	2.3	2.0	**0.5**	1.55	13.2
2012	San Antonio	33	33	31.8	**.521**	.000	.706	7.2	2.1	**2.2**	0.4	1.70	16.3
2014	San Antonio	**34**	20	24.3	.469	.000	.658	4.6	1.5	1.1	0.2	**0.76**	8.2
2015	San Antonio	**34**	29	27.4	.458	.000	.738	5.0	1.4	1.2	0.3	1.62	11.5
Career	9 years, 1 team	301	282	30.8	.468	.223	.718	6.0	1.8	1.6	0.4	1.61	14.3

=== Postseason ===
Year	Team	GP	GS	MPG	FG%	3P%	FT%	RPG	APG	SPG	BPG	TO	PPG
2007	San Antonio	5	5	34.4	.507	.000	.844	**9.0**	1.6	0.8	0.4	1.60	**20.2**
2008	San Antonio	**9**	**9**	**36.1**	.456	.000	.750	5.9	1.7	1.6	0.1	2.11	17.7
2009	San Antonio	3	3	32.0	.458	**.500**	.684	5.3	2.0	2.0	**0.7**	1.67	19.3
2010	San Antonio	2	2	33.0	.406	.000	.556	**9.0**	2.5	1.0	0.5	3.50	15.5
2011	San Antonio	3	3	34.0	**.633**	.000	.667	5.7	**3.0**	1.3	0.6	1.33	16.7
2012	San Antonio	2	2	35.5	.533	.000	**.889**	5.0	0.5	**2.5**	0.6	2.00	20.0
2014	San Antonio	2	0	27.0	.500	.000	.429	5.0	1.5	1.0	0.5	**1.00**	8.5
Career	7 years, 1 team	26	24	34.1	.486	.333	.734	6.5	1.8	1.5	0.4	1.88	17.5

== Personal life ==
She is married to Jermaine Malcolm and the mother of two children, Skye and Sevyn.

Young-Malcolm holds a Bachelors Degree in Education from Baylor University. Along with a master's degree in education from the University of Phoenix and another master's degree in Christian ministries from the Liberty Theological Seminary.

In August 2013, Young said that she was against same-sex marriage on Twitter, in response to San Antonio – where she was playing at the time – proposing legislature adding gender identity and sexual orientation to the city’s non-discrimination laws. Her comments were decried by LGBT advocacy groups and fans, as well as Laurel J. Richie, then-president of the WNBA, and four-time league MVP Lauren Jackson.

== Awards and achievements ==
- 2008–2009 FIBA Eurocup Winner with (Turkey) Galatasaray
- 2009 WNBA All-Star Selection
