= Lindsay Bowen =

American basketball player (born 1983)

Personal information
- Born: October 25, 1983 (age 41) Dansville, Michigan, U.S.
- Listed height: 6 ft 0 in (1.83 m)
- Listed weight: 160 lb (73 kg)

Career information
- High school: Dansville High School (Dansville, Michigan)
- College: Michigan State (2002–2006)
- WNBA draft: 2006: undrafted
- Position: Guard
- Number: 30

Career history
- 2007: New York Liberty

Career highlights
- Big Ten Freshman of the Year (2003); Big Ten All-Freshman Team (2003)
- Stats at Basketball Reference

Lindsay Bowen (born October 25, 1983) is a former American professional women's basketball player. She played with the WNBA's New York Liberty in 2007, and had a European basketball career until 2010. A guard, she is 5'7" tall and weighs 145 pounds.

== Career ==
Bowen grew up in Dansville, Michigan. Bowen previously played basketball for Michigan State University. She graduated in 2006.

Bowen was one of the 11 finalists for the Nancy Lieberman Award.

In August 2012, Bowen joined the Texas Tech University Women's basketball staff as video coordinator.\

In August 2015, Bowen joined the Presbyterian College women's basketball staff as an assistant coach.

Bowen followed Presbyterian College coach Ronny Fisher to Campbell University as an assistant coach for the 2016–17 season.

== Career statistics ==
=== WNBA career statistics ===
Legend
GP	Games played	GS	Games started	MPG	Minutes per game	RPG	Rebounds per game
APG	Assists per game	SPG	Steals per game	BPG	Blocks per game	PPG	Points per game
TO	Turnovers per game	FG%	Field-goal percentage	3P%	3-point field-goal percentage	FT%	Free-throw percentage
**Bold**	Career best	°	League leader

==== Regular season ====
Year	Team	GP	GS	MPG	FG%	3P%	FT%	RPG	APG	SPG	BPG	TO	PPG
2007	New York	6	1	37	30.0	50.0	0.0	1.9	1.0	0.0	0.0	3.9	8.8
Career	1 year, 1 team	6	1	37	30.0	50.0	0.0	1.9	1.0	0.0	0.0	3.9	8.8

=== College career statistics ===
Legend
GP	Games played	GS	Games started	MPG	Minutes per game
FG%	Field goal percentage	3P%	3-point field goal percentage	FT%	Free throw percentage
RPG	Rebounds per game	APG	Assists per game	SPG	Steals per game
BPG	Blocks per game	PPG	Points per game	**Bold**	Career high

Year	Team	GP	Points	FG%	3P%	FT%	RPG	APG	SPG	BPG	PPG
2002-03	Michigan State	29	386	**43.6%**	**46.4%**	**95.5%**	2.4	2.2	0.8	0.0	13.3
2003-04	Michigan State	31	419	38.9%	37.7%	86.5%	2.5	2.4	1.3	**0.1**	13.5
2004-05	Michigan State	**37**	**511**	40.7%	43.0%	81.7%	2.5	2.8	1.0	-	**13.8**
2005-06	Michigan State	34	423	36.5%	34.0%	92.0%	**3.7**	**3.8**	**1.9**	0.0	12.4
Career		131	1739	39.7%	40.1%	87.8%	2.8	2.8	1.3	0.0	13.3
