= 2005 NCAA Division I women's basketball tournament =

College basketball championships in Indianapolis

- Teams: 64
- Finals site: RCA Dome, Indianapolis, Indiana
- Champions: Baylor Bears (1st title, 1st title game, 1st Final Four)
- Runner-up: Michigan State Spartans (1st title game, 1st Final Four)
- Semifinalists: LSU Tigers (2nd Final Four); Tennessee Volunteers (16th Final Four)
- Winning coach: Kim Mulkey (1st title)
- MOP: Sophia Young (Baylor)

The 2005 NCAA Division I women's basketball tournament began on March 19, 2005, and concluded on April 5, 2005, when Baylor was crowned as the new national champion. The Final Four was held for the first (and last) time at the RCA Dome in Indianapolis, Indiana on April 3 and 5, 2005, and was hosted by Butler University and the Horizon League. Future Final Fours will be held every five years in Indianapolis, the NCAA's home city, will be played at Lucas Oil Stadium, one block south of the Indiana Convention Center, where the RCA Dome is located. Baylor, coached by Kim Mulkey-Robertson, defeated Michigan State, coached by Joanne P. McCallie, 84–62 in the championship game. Baylor's Sophia Young was named Most Outstanding Player. For the first time, taking a page from the Men's Tournament, the regionals were named after the city they were played in, rather than the geographical location (East, Mideast, Midwest and West), and the "pod" system adopted by the Men's Tournament was used.

== Notable events ==
In three of the four regions, the number one seed in the region advanced to the Final Four. In the Chattanooga Regional, 13th seeded Liberty upset both Penn State and DePaul to advance to the regional semifinal, but there encountered the top seed LSU, who won and went on to defeat Duke to advance to the Final Four in Indianapolis.

In the Philadelphia Regional, Tennessee faced Purdue in the second round. The victory represented the 880th win for coach Pat Summitt, moving her beyond Dean Smith 879 career victories, to claim the top spot in college basketball career victories. Rutgers upset Ohio State to advance to the regional final, but top seeded Tennessee won to advance. In the Kansas City Regional, top seeded Michigan State defeated the 2 seed Stanford to advance. The single exception was in the Tempe Regional, where second seeded Baylor upset North Carolina to earn a spot at the Final Four.

In one semifinal, Baylor faced LSU. Five years earlier, Baylor had won just seven games against twenty losses, and had never been to an NCAA Tournament. Then they hired Kim Mulkey, who coached the team to an NCAA berth in her first year, and now was coaching a team in the Final Four. However, thirteen minutes into the game, LSU led 24–9. The two teams had played before, in the opening regular season game for Baylor. In that game the Lady Bears found themselves down by 19 points at halftime. They almost closed the gap, but ended up with a one-point loss. This time, they found themselves down again by a large margin. Mulkey called a timeout, and the team responded with six straight points. Not long after, a three-pointer cut the lead to six, and they continued to chip away, reaching the halftime with the score tied at 28. After the break, LSU retook the lead, and were up by four points with just over eight minutes to play, but would go scoreless for five minutes. Baylor retook the lead, and held on to win 68–57 to advance to the championship game. Ironically, 16 years later, Kim Mulkey would depart Baylor to become the head coach at LSU.

In the second semifinal, Tennessee faced Michigan State, who were playing in their first Final Four. The Lady Vols had a six-point lead at halftime, but extended the lead to 16 points with fourteen and a half minutes to go. Although the crowd had watched Baylor recover from a 15-point deficit earlier in the evening, that had occurred with 28 minutes to play. This time, the deficit was 16 and just over 14 minutes left. The Spartans cut into the lead, and with a minute to go had tied the game. At that point Kristin Haynie, who had only scored two points in the game, stole the ball and ran almost the length of the floor to score a layup and take the lead. Tennessee then missed three shots and Michigan State scored the final points of the game to tie the record for the largest comeback in NCAA Tournament history.

The final matched up two nontraditional names in women's basketball. Michigan State had never before advanced beyond the second round, and Baylor had but once, and was only in their fourth NCAA tournament ever. Baylor opened up a 19-point lead early, but no lead seemed safe after 15 point and 16 point comebacks in the semifinals. The lead ballooned to 23, then Michigan State attempted a comeback, but the Lady Bears were too strong, and went on to win their first national championship 84–62.

== Locations ==
2005 NCAA NCAA first and second round venues
2005 NCAA Regionals and Final Four

So as to decrease the number of games played on a competing team's home court, the subregionals were held at eight locations, rather than 16, for the first time. Furthermore, following the lead of the men's tournament in recent years, the 2005 women's tournament used the "pod system", keeping most teams at or close to the home cities, and were held from March 19 to 22 at these locations:

- March 19 and 21:

Bank of America Arena at Hec Edmundson Pavilion, Seattle, Washington (Host: University of Washington)
Reunion Arena, Dallas, Texas (Host: University of Texas at Austin and Texas Tech University)
Save Mart Center, Fresno, California (Host: Fresno State University)
Williams Arena, Minneapolis, Minnesota (Host: University of Minnesota, Twin Cities)

- March 20 and 22:

Comcast Center, College Park, Maryland (Host: University of Maryland, College Park)
Dean Smith Center, Chapel Hill, North Carolina (Host: University of North Carolina at Chapel Hill)
Harry A. Gampel Pavilion, Storrs, Connecticut (Host: University of Connecticut)
Thompson-Boling Arena, Knoxville, Tennessee (Host: University of Tennessee)

The regionals were held from March 26 to 29 in the following regions. The regionals, for the first time, were named after the city they were played in instead of a direction (East, South, Midwest, West).

- March 26 and 28:

Chattanooga Regional, McKenzie Arena, Chattanooga, Tennessee (Host: University of Tennessee at Chattanooga)
Tempe Regional, Wells Fargo Arena, Tempe, Arizona (Host: Arizona State University)

- March 27 and 29:

Kansas City Regional, Municipal Auditorium, Kansas City, Missouri (Host: University of Missouri–Kansas City)
Philadelphia Regional, Liacouras Center, Philadelphia, Pennsylvania (Host: Temple University)

The regional winners advanced to the Final Four, held on April 3 and 5, 2005 at the RCA Dome, in Indianapolis, Indiana, hosted by both Butler University and the Horizon League.

== Tournament records ==
- Margin overcome—Michigan State overcame a 16-point deficit, trailing 47–31, with 16:03 remaining, but rallied to beat Tennessee 68–64. The 16 point margin overcome is the largest in an NCAA semifinal game.

== Qualifying teams - automatic ==
Sixty-four teams were selected to participate in the 2005 NCAA Tournament. Thirty-one conferences were eligible for an automatic bid to the 2005 NCAA tournament.

Automatic Bids
		Record		
Qualifying School	Conference	Regular Season	Conference	Seed
Alcorn State	SWAC	21–8	14–4	16
Baylor	Big 12 Conference	27–3	14–2	2
Bowling Green	MAC	23–7	13–3	13
Canisius	MAAC	21–9	14–4	15
Connecticut	Big East	23–7	13–3	3
Coppin State	MEAC	23–7	15–3	16
Dartmouth	Ivy League	17–10	12–2	14
Eastern Kentucky	Ohio Valley Conference	23–8	15–1	12
Green Bay	Horizon League	27–3	15–1	10
Hartford	America East	22–8	13–5	14
Holy Cross	Patriot League	20–10	12–2	15
Illinois State	Missouri Valley Conference	13–17	7–11	15
Liberty	Big South Conference	24–6	13–1	13
Michigan State	Big Ten	28–3	14–2	1
Middle Tennessee State	Sun Belt Conference	23–7	11–3	12
Montana	Big Sky Conference	22–7	13–1	12
New Mexico	Mountain West	26–4	12–2	8
North Carolina	ACC	28–4	12–2	1
Old Dominion	Colonial	22–8	15–3	11
Oral Roberts	Mid-Continent	22–8	10–6	14
Rice	WAC	24–8	14–4	11
Santa Clara	West Coast Conference	17–13	8–6	15
St. Francis (PA)	Northeast Conference	21–9	16–2	14
Stanford	Pac-10	29–2	17–1	2
Stetson	Atlantic Sun Conference	17–13	11–9	16
TCU	Conference USA	23–9	10–4	7
Temple	Atlantic 10	27–3	16–0	6
Tennessee	SEC	26–4	13–1	1
UT-Arlington	Southland	21–9	13–3	13
UC-Santa Barbara	Big West Conference	21–8	16–2	13
Western Carolina	Southern Conference	18–13	10–10	16

== Qualifying teams - at-large ==
Thirty-three additional teams were selected to complete the sixty-four invitations.

At-large Bids
		Record		
Qualifying School	Conference	Regular Season	Conference	Seed
Arizona	Pacific-10	19–11	11–7	9
Arizona State	Pacific-10	21–9	12–6	5
Boston College	Big East	19–9	10–6	7
DePaul	Conference USA	25–4	13–1	5
Duke	Atlantic Coast	28–4	12–2	2
Florida State	Atlantic Coast	23–7	9–5	6
George Washington	Atlantic 10	22–8	13–3	9
Georgia	Southeastern	22–9	9–5	6
Houston	Conference USA	21–8	10–4	10
Iowa State	Big 12	23–6	12–4	7
Kansas State	Big 12	23–7	12–4	4
Louisiana Tech	Western Athletic	20–9	14–4	11
Louisville	Conference USA	22–8	11–3	9
LSU	Southeastern	29–2	14–0	1
Maryland	Atlantic Coast	21–9	7–7	7
Minnesota	Big Ten	24–7	12–4	3
Ole Miss	Southeastern	19–10	8–6	8
N.C. State	Atlantic Coast	21–7	10–4	5
Notre Dame	Big East	26–5	13–3	4
Ohio State	Big Ten	29–3	14–2	2
Oklahoma	Big 12	17–12	8–8	8
Oregon	Pacific-10	20–9	12–6	10
Penn State	Big Ten	19–10	13–3	4
Purdue	Big Ten	16–12	9–7	9
Richmond	Atlantic 10	23–7	12–4	11
Rutgers	Big East	25–6	14–2	3
USC	Pacific-10	19–10	12–6	8
Texas	Big 12	21–8	13–3	3
Texas Tech	Big 12	22–7	12–4	4
Utah	Mountain West	25–7	12–2	10
Vanderbilt	Southeastern	22–7	10–4	5
Virginia	Atlantic Coast	20–10	8–6	6
Virginia Tech	Atlantic Coast	17–11	6–8	12

== Tournament seeds ==
Chattanooga RegionalMcKenzie Arena, Chattanooga, Tennessee
Seed	School	Conference	Record	Berth type
1	LSU	SEC	29–2	At-large
2	Duke	ACC	28–4	At-large
3	Texas	Big 12	21–8	At-large
4	Penn State	Big Ten	19–10	At-large
5	DePaul	Conference USA	25–4	At-large
6	Georgia	SEC	22–9	At-large
7	Boston College	Big East	19–9	At-large
8	Oklahoma	Big 12	17–12	At-large
9	Arizona	Pac-10	19–11	At-large
10	Houston	Conference USA	21–8	At-large
11	Rice	WAC	24–8	Automatic
12	Virginia Tech	ACC	17–11	At-large
13	Liberty	Big South	24–6	Automatic
14	Oral Roberts	Mid-Continent	22–8	Automatic
15	Canisius	MAAC	21–9	Automatic
16	Stetson	Atlantic Sun	17–13	Automatic

Philadelphia RegionalLiacouras Center, Philadelphia, Pennsylvania
Seed	School	Conference	Record	Berth type
1	Tennessee	SEC	26–4	Automatic
2	Ohio State	Big Ten	29–3	At-large
3	Rutgers	Big East	25–6	At-large
4	Texas Tech	Big 12	22–7	At-large
5	NC State	ACC	21–7	At-large
6	Temple	Atlantic 10	27–3	Automatic
7	Maryland	ACC	21–9	At-large
8	New Mexico	Mountain West	26–4	Automatic
9	Purdue	Big Ten	16–12	At-large
10	Green Bay	Horizon League	27–3	Automatic
11	Louisiana Tech	WAC	20–9	At-large
12	Middle Tennessee	Sun Belt	23–7	Automatic
13	UT Arlington	Southland	21–9	Automatic
14	Hartford	America East	22–8	Automatic
15	Holy Cross	Patriot League	20–10	Automatic
16	Western Carolina	Southern	18–13	Automatic

Tempe RegionalWells Fargo Arena, Tempe, Arizona
Seed	School	Conference	Record	Berth type
1	North Carolina	ACC	28–4	Automatic
2	Baylor	Big 12	27–3	Automatic
3	Minnesota	Big Ten	24–7	At-large
4	Notre Dame	Big East	26–5	At-large
5	Arizona State	Pac-10	21–9	At-large
6	Virginia	ACC	20–10	At-large
7	TCU	Conference USA	23–9	Automatic
8	Ole Miss	SEC	19–10	At-large
9	George Washington	Atlantic 10	22–8	At-large
10	Oregon	Pac-10	20–9	At-large
11	Old Dominion	Colonial	22–8	Automatic
12	Eastern Kentucky	Ohio Valley	23–8	Automatic
13	UC Santa Barbara	Big West	21–8	Automatic
14	Saint Francis	Northeast	21–9	Automatic
15	Illinois State	Missouri Valley	13–17	Automatic
16	Coppin State	MEAC	23–7	Automatic

Kansas City RegionalMunicipal Auditorium, Kansas City, Missouri
Seed	School	Conference	Record	Berth type
1	Michigan State	Big Ten	28–3	Automatic
2	Stanford	Pac-10	29–2	Automatic
3	Connecticut	Big East	23–7	Automatic
4	Kansas State	Big 12	23–7	At-large
5	Vanderbilt	SEC	22–7	At-large
6	Florida State	ACC	23–7	At-large
7	Iowa State	Big 12	23–6	At-large
8	USC	Pac-10	19–10	At-large
9	Louisville	Conference USA	22–8	At-large
10	Utah	Mountain West	25–7	At-large
11	Richmond	Atlantic 10	23–7	At-large
12	Montana	Big Sky	22–7	Automatic
13	Bowling Green	MAC	23–7	Automatic
14	Dartmouth	Ivy League	17–10	Automatic
15	Santa Clara	West Coast	17–13	Automatic
16	Alcorn State	SWAC	21–8	Automatic

== Bids by conference ==
Thirty-one conferences earned an automatic bid. In twenty-one cases, the automatic bid was the only representative from the conference. Thirty-three additional at-large teams were selected from ten of the conferences.

Bids	Conference	Teams
7	Atlantic Coast	North Carolina, Duke, Florida State, Maryland, North Carolina State, Virginia, Virginia Tech
6	Big 12	Baylor, Iowa State, Kansas State, Oklahoma, Texas, Texas Tech
5	Big Ten	Michigan State, Minnesota, Ohio State, Penn State, Purdue
5	Pacific-10	Stanford, Arizona, Arizona State, Oregon, Southern California
5	Southeastern	Tennessee, Georgia, LSU, Ole Miss, Vanderbilt
4	Big East	Connecticut, Boston College, Notre Dame, Rutgers
4	Conference USA	TCU, DePaul, Houston, Louisville
3	Atlantic 10	Temple, George Washington, Richmond
2	Mountain West	New Mexico, Utah
2	Western Athletic	Rice, Louisiana Tech
1	America East	Hartford
1	Atlantic Sun	Stetson
1	Big Sky	Montana
1	Big South	Liberty
1	Big West	UC Santa Barb.
1	Colonial	Old Dominion
1	Horizon	Green Bay
1	Ivy	Dartmouth
1	Metro Atlantic	Canisius
1	Mid-American	Bowling Green
1	Mid-Continent	Oral Roberts
1	Mid-Eastern	Coppin State
1	Missouri Valley	Illinois State
1	Northeast	St. Francis Pa.
1	Ohio Valley	Eastern Ky.
1	Patriot	Holy Cross
1	Southern	Western Caro.
1	Southland	Texas-Arlington
1	Southwestern	Alcorn State
1	Sun Belt	Middle Tenn.
1	West Coast	Santa Clara

== Bids by state ==
The sixty-four teams came from thirty-one states, plus Washington, D.C. Texas had the most teams with seven bids. Nineteen states did not have any teams receiving bids.

NCAA Women's basketball Tournament invitations by state 2005

Bids	State	Teams
7	Texas	Baylor, Rice, TCU, Texas-Arlington, Houston, Texas, Texas Tech
5	Virginia	Liberty, Old Dominion, Richmond, Virginia, Virginia Tech
4	California	Santa Clara, Stanford, UC Santa Barb., Southern California
4	North Carolina	North Carolina, Western Caro., Duke, North Carolina State
3	Tennessee	Middle Tenn., Tennessee, Vanderbilt
2	Arizona	Arizona, Arizona State
2	Connecticut	Connecticut, Hartford
2	Florida	Stetson, Florida State
2	Illinois	Illinois State, DePaul
2	Indiana	Notre Dame, Purdue
2	Kentucky	Eastern Ky., Louisville
2	Louisiana	Louisiana Tech, LSU
2	Maryland	Coppin State, Maryland
2	Massachusetts	Holy Cross, Boston College
2	Mississippi	Alcorn State, Ole Miss
2	New York	Canisius, St. Francis
2	Ohio	Bowling Green, Ohio State
2	Oklahoma	Oral Roberts, Oklahoma
2	Pennsylvania	Temple, Penn State
1	District of Columbia	George Washington
1	Georgia	Georgia
1	Iowa	Iowa State
1	Kansas	Kansas State
1	Michigan	Michigan State
1	Minnesota	Minnesota
1	Montana	Montana
1	New Hampshire	Dartmouth
1	New Jersey	Rutgers
1	New Mexico	New Mexico
1	Oregon	Oregon
1	Utah	Utah
1	Wisconsin	Green Bay

== Brackets ==
Data source

=== Chattanooga Regional ===
First round March 19 and 20
1	LSU	70
16	Stetson	36
Knoxville, TN – Sun/Tue
8	Oklahoma	69
9	Arizona	72
5	DePaul	79
12	Virginia Tech	78
College Park, MD – Sun/Tue
4	Penn State	70
13	Liberty	78
6	Georgia	75
11	Rice	49
Dallas, TX – Sat/Mon
3	Texas	63
14	Oral Roberts	58
7	Boston College	65
10	Houston	43
Chapel Hill, NC – Sun/Tue
2	Duke	80
15	Canisius	48

Second round March 21 and 22
1	LSU	76
9	Arizona	43
5	DePaul	79
13	Liberty	88
6	Georgia	70
3	Texas	68
7	Boston College	65
2	Duke	70

Regional semifinals March 26
1	LSU	90
13	Liberty	48
6	Georgia	57
2	Duke	63

Regional finals March 28
1	LSU	59
2	Duke	49

=== Tempe Regional ===
First round March 19 and 20
1	North Carolina	97
16	Coppin State	62
Chapel Hill, NC – Sun/Tue
8	Ole Miss	57
9	George Washington	60
5	Arizona State	87
12	Eastern Kentucky	65
Fresno, CA – Sat/Mon
4	Notre Dame	61
13	UC Santa Barbara	51
6	Virginia	79
11	Old Dominion	57
Minneapolis, MN – Sat/Mon
3	Minnesota	64
14	Saint Francis	33
7	TCU	55
10	Oregon	58
Seattle, WA – Sat/Mon
2	Baylor	91
15	Illinois State	70

Second round March 21 and 22
1	North Carolina	71
9	George Washington	47
5	Arizona State	70
4	Notre Dame	61
6	Virginia	58
3	Minnesota	73
10	Oregon	46
2	Baylor	69

Regional semifinals March 26
1	North Carolina	79
5	Arizona State	72
3	Minnesota	57
2	Baylor	64

Regional finals March 28
1	North Carolina	63
2	Baylor	72

=== Philadelphia Regional ===
First round March 19 and 20
1	Tennessee	94
16	Western Carolina	43
Knoxville, TN – Sun/Tue
8	New Mexico	56
9	Purdue	68
5	NC State	58
12	Middle Tennessee	60
Dallas, TX – Sat/Mon
4	Texas Tech	69
13	Texas-Arlington	49
6	Temple	66
11	Louisiana Tech	61
Storrs, CT – Sun/Tue
3	Rutgers	62
14	Hartford	37
7	Maryland	65
10	Green Bay	55
College Park, MD – Sun/Tue
2	Ohio State	86
15	Holy Cross	45

Second round March 21 and 22
1	Tennessee	75
9	Purdue	54
12	Middle Tennessee	69
4	Texas Tech	80
6	Temple	54
3	Rutgers	61
7	Maryland	65
2	Ohio State	75

Regional semifinals March 27
1	Tennessee	75
4	Texas Tech	59
3	Rutgers	64
2	Ohio State	58

Regional finals March 29
1	Tennessee	59
3	Rutgers	49

=== Kansas City Regional ===
First round March 19 and 20
1	Michigan State	73
16	Alcorn State	41
Minneapolis, MN – Sat/Mon
8	USC	65
9	Louisville	49
5	Vanderbilt	67
12	Montana	44
Seattle, WA – Sat/Mon
4	Kansas State	70
13	Bowling Green	60
6	Florida State	87
11	Richmond	54
Storrs, CT – Sun/Tue
3	Connecticut	95
14	Dartmouth	47
7	Iowa State	61
10	Utah	73
Fresno, CA – Sat/Mon
2	Stanford	94
15	Santa Clara	57

Second round March 21 and 22
1	Michigan State	61
8	USC	59
5	Vanderbilt	63
4	Kansas State	60
6	Florida State	52
3	Connecticut	70
10	Utah	62
2	Stanford	88

Regional semifinals March 27
1	Michigan State	76
5	Vanderbilt	64
3	Connecticut	59
2	Stanford	76

Regional finals March 29
1	Michigan State	76
2	Stanford	69

=== Final Four - Indianapolis, Indiana ===
National semifinals April 3
ME1	LSU	57
W2	Baylor	68
E1	Tennessee	64
MW1	Michigan State	68

National championship game April 5
W2	Baylor	84
MW1	Michigan State	62

== Record by conference ==
Conference	# of Bids	Record	Win %	Sweet Sixteen	Elite Eight	Final Four	Championship Game
SEC	5	12–5	70.6%	4	2	2	0
Big 12	6	10–5	66.7%	2	1	1	1
Big Ten	5	10–5	66.7%	3	1	1	1
Big South Conference	1	2–1	66.7%	1	0	0	0
Big East	4	7–4	63.6%	2	1	0	0
Pac-10	5	8–5	61.5%	2	1	0	0
ACC	7	9–7	56.3%	2	2	0	0
Sun Belt Conference	1	1-1	50.0%	0	0	0	0
Atlantic 10	3	2–3	40.0%	0	0	0	0
Mountain West	2	1–2	33.3%	0	0	0	0
Conference USA	4	1–4	20.0%	0	0	0	0
WAC	2	0–2	0.0%	0	0	0	0

Nineteen conferences went 0-1: America East, Atlantic Sun Conference Big Sky Conference, Big West Conference, Colonial, Horizon League, Ivy League, MAAC, MAC, Summit League, MEAC, Missouri Valley Conference, Northeast Conference, Ohio Valley Conference, Patriot League, Southern Conference, Southland, SWAC, and West Coast Conference

== All-Tournament Team ==
- Sophia Young, Baylor
- Steffanie Blackmon, Baylor
- Emily Niemann, Baylor
- Lindsay Bowen, Michigan St.
- Kristin Haynie, Michigan St.

== Game Officials ==
- Dee Kantner (semifinal)
- Sally Bell (semifinal)
- Tina Napier (semifinal)
- Barb Smith (semifinal)
- Bob Trammel (semifinal)
- Michael Price (semifinal)
- Lisa Mattingly (final)
- Melissa Barlow (final)
- Scott Yarbrough (final)

== See also ==
- 2005 NCAA Division II women's basketball tournament
- 2005 NCAA Division III women's basketball tournament
- 2005 NAIA Division I women's basketball tournament
- 2005 NAIA Division II women's basketball tournament
- 2005 NCAA Division I men's basketball tournament
