= Kim Mulkey =

Basketball player and coach (born 1962)

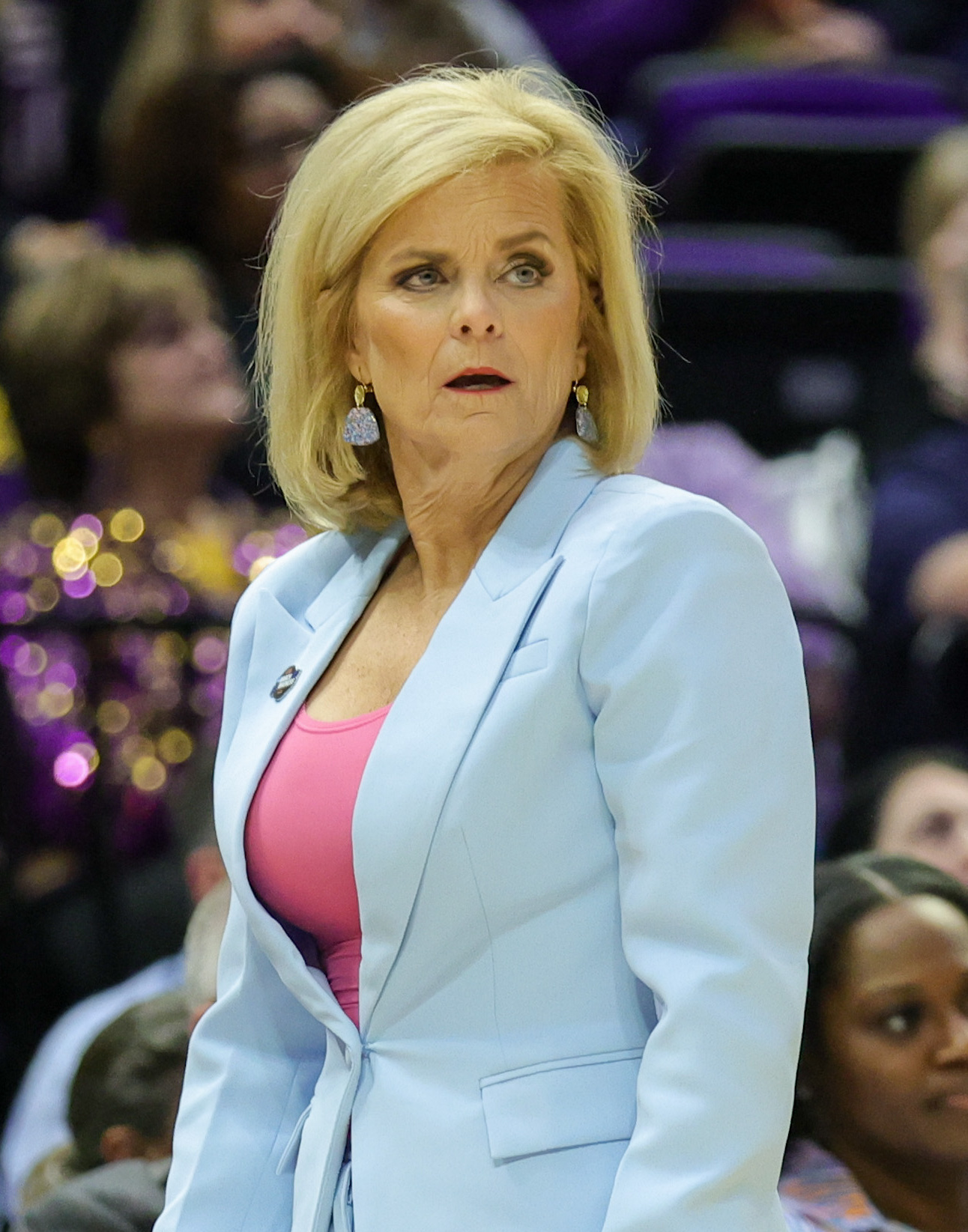
- Mulkey coaching LSU in 2024

Current position
- Title: Head coach
- Team: LSU
- Conference: SEC
- Record: 145–26 (.848)

Biographical details
- Born: May 17, 1962 (age 64); Santa Ana, California, U.S.

Playing career
- 1980–1984: Louisiana Tech
- 1983–1984: USA National Team
- Position: Point guard

Coaching career (HC unless noted)
- 1985–1996: Louisiana Tech (assistant)
- 1996–2000: Louisiana Tech (associate HC)
- 2000–2021: Baylor
- 2021–present: LSU

Head coaching record
- Overall: 775–130 (.856)

Accomplishments and honors

Championships
- As player: NCAA Division I tournament (1982); AIAW Division I tournament (1981); As assistant coach: NCAA Division I Tournament (1988); As head coach: 4× NCAA Division I Tournament (2005, 2012, 2019, 2023); 5× NCAA Regional—Final Four (2005, 2010, 2012, 2019, 2023); 12× Big 12 regular season (2005, 2011–2021); 11× Big 12 tournament (2005, 2009, 2011–2016, 2018, 2019, 2021)

Awards
- 3× AP College Basketball Coach of the Year (2012, 2019, 2022); Naismith College Coach of the Year (2012); 3× USBWA National Coach of the Year (2011, 2012, 2019); 2× WBCA National Coach of the Year (2012, 2019); 8× Big 12 Coach of the Year (2005, 2011–2013, 2015, 2018–2020); Louisiana Tech Athletic Hall of Fame (1992); Frances Pomeroy Naismith Award (1984)
- Basketball Hall of Fame; Inducted in 2020 (profile)
- Women's Basketball Hall of Fame
Medal record
Women's basketball
Representing United States
Olympic Games
Gold medal – first place	1984 Los Angeles	Team competition
Pan American
Gold medal – first place	1983 Caracas	Team competition
FIBA World Championship for Women
Silver medal – second place	1983 Rio de Janeiro	Team competition
Jones Cup
Gold medal – first place	1984 Taipei	Team competition

Kimberly Duane Mulkey (born May 17, 1962) is an American college basketball coach and former player. Since 2021, she has been the head coach for Louisiana State University's LSU women's basketball team. A Pan-American gold medalist in 1983 and Olympic gold medalist in 1984, she is the first coach in NCAA basketball history to win national championships as a player, assistant coach, and head coach. Since the inception of the NCAA women's tournament in 1982, Mulkey has participated as a player or coach every year except 1985 and 2003.

As head coach, her teams won NCAA championships at Baylor in 2005, 2012, and 2019; and at LSU in 2023. Mulkey is one of seven coaches to have led teams to more than one championship win, ranking third behind UConn's Geno Auriemma's 12 titles and former Tennessee coach Pat Summitt's 8 wins.

Mulkey was inducted into the Women's Basketball Hall of Fame in 2000 and into the Naismith Memorial Basketball Hall of Fame in 2020.

In 2007, Mulkey penned her autobiography, titled Won't Back Down: Teams, Dreams and Family.

== Youth ==
Kim Mulkey was born in Santa Ana, California, and spent her childhood in Tickfaw, Louisiana. After playing basketball at Nesom Junior High School in Tickfaw, she led her Hammond High School basketball team to four consecutive state championships. As high school valedictorian, she graduated with a 4.0 GPA.

== Louisiana Tech player ==
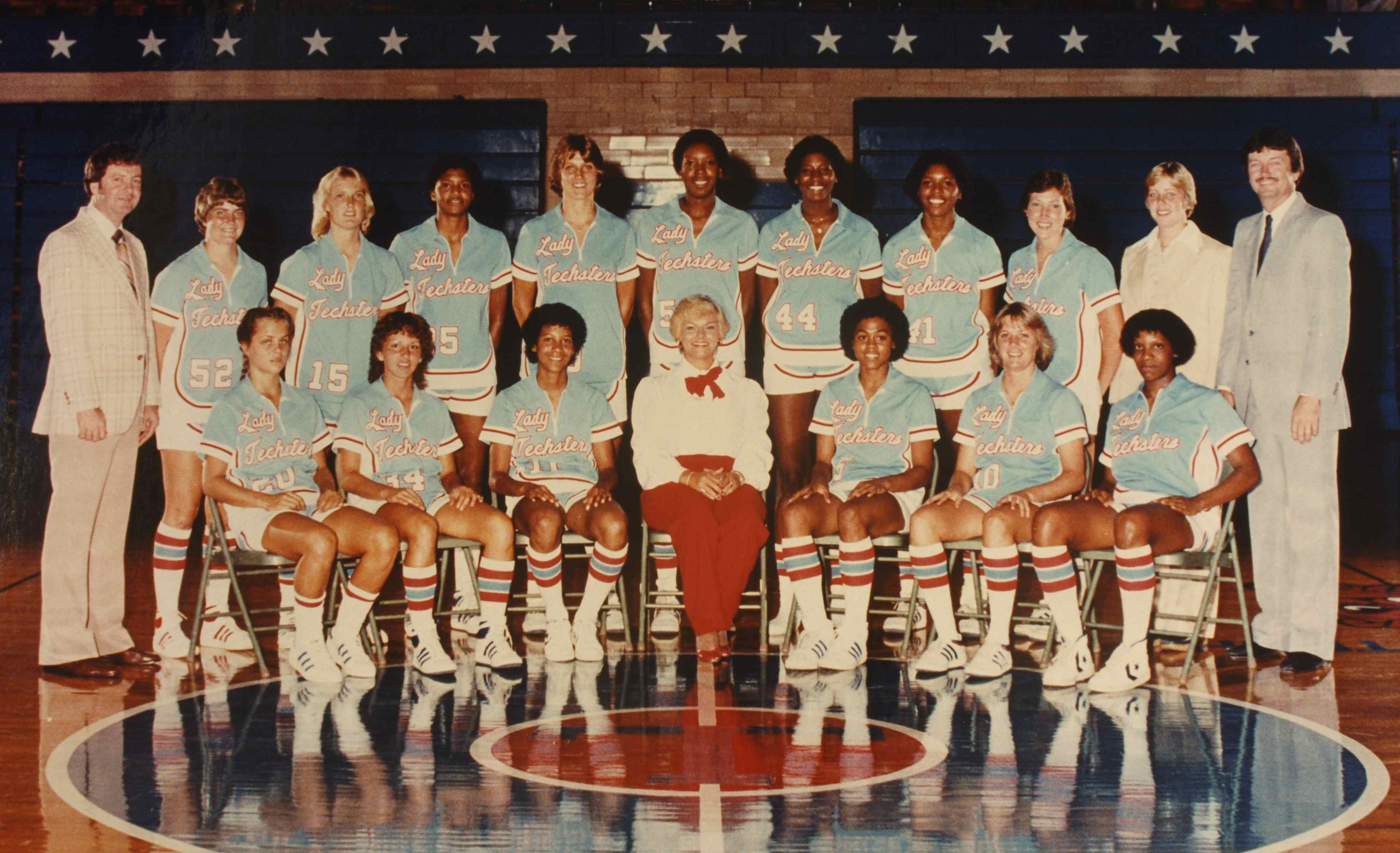
Mulkey on the 1982 Louisiana Tech women's basketball team

The 5 ft 4 in (1.63 m) Mulkey was an All-American point guard at Louisiana Tech University, winning two national championships as a player: the AIAW title in 1981 and the inaugural NCAA title in 1982. In 1984, she was the inaugural winner of the women's Frances Pomeroy Naismith Award, awarded to the top college senior under 5'6"/1.68 m (the height limit was later raised).

== USA Basketball ==
Mulkey was selected to be a member of the USA National women's basketball team for the 1983 Pan American Games in Caracas, Venezuela. The team won all five games to earn the gold medal for the event. Mulkey averaged 12.4 points per game. At the 1983 World Championships, USA National took home the silver medal after winning six games and losing two, with Mulkey averaging 3.1 points per game.

USA National won its eight games at the 1984 Jones Cup by an average of just under 50 points per game. Mulkey averaged 6.8 points per game. At the 1984 Summer Olympics, USA National won its six games to earn the gold medal, with Mulkey averaging 5.3 points per game.

== Coaching career (1985-present) ==
=== Louisiana Tech (1985–2000) ===
In 1985, Mulkey was hired as an assistant coach at Louisiana Tech under Leon Barmore, then promoted to associate head coach in 1996 before leaving in 2000. Over her 15 years, Tech posted a 430–68 record and advanced to 7 Final Fours, winning the NCAA championship in 1988. She was inducted into the College Sports Information Directors of America's Academic Hall of Fame for her classroom achievements.

=== Baylor (2000–2021) ===
In 2000, Mulkey took over a Baylor program that had finished its previous season 7–20 and last in the Big 12 Conference. Baylor received its first NCAA tournament bid during her inaugural season, going on to the tournament 18 more times. During her tenure, the Bears advanced 4 times to the Final Four, winning the championship in 2005, 2012, and 2019. The 2012 national title followed a 40-0 perfect season, the first in program history.

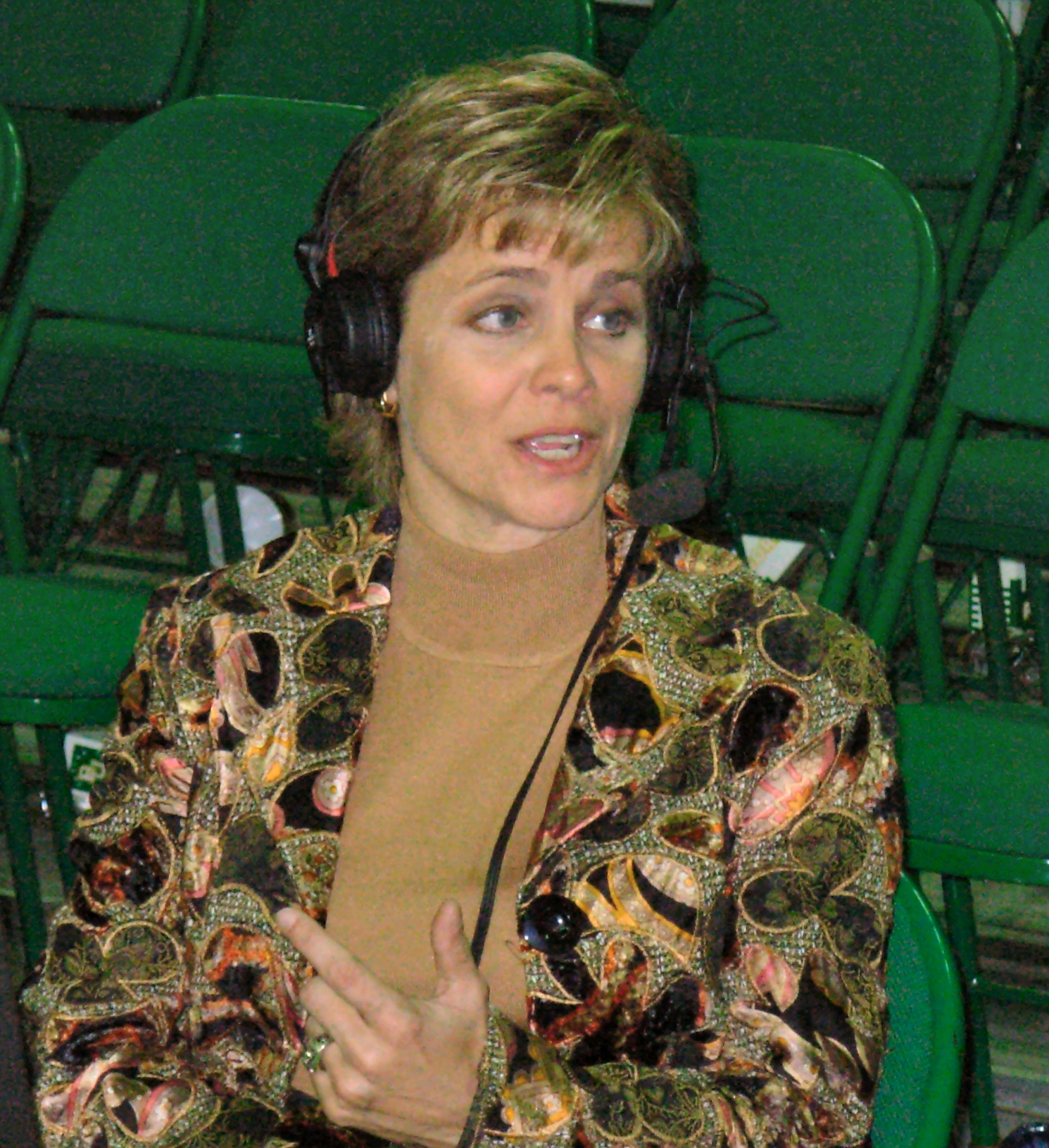
Mulkey in a postgame interview in 2006

==== During the COVID-19 pandemic ====
Although the 2020 NCAA tournament was cancelled due to the COVID-19 pandemic, Baylor made it to the Elite Eight of the 2021 tournament, held in an event isolation "bubble.” During the Elite Eight round, Mulkey advocated ending COVID-19 testing on the tournament players despite the ongoing pandemic. She stated during a press conference that the organization tasked with running the student tournament should "dump the COVID testing", despite not being asked about it by reporters. She then stated more fully, "Wouldn't it be a shame to keep COVID testing, and then you got kids [testing] positive or something, and they don't get to play in the Final Four? So you need to just forget the COVID tests and let the four teams that are playing in each Final Four go battle it out." Mulkey herself had tested positive for the virus earlier in the season, and made the comments following her team's loss to UConn, a team that Baylor was supposed to face earlier in the season but was cancelled due to Mulkey's COVID diagnosis. According to CBS News, her comments were later described by "many basketball fans" as "misinformed, dangerous and irresponsible". Connecticut head coach Geno Auriemma later defended Mulkey's comments, noting the complexity of decisions during the pandemic particularly in the context of college sports.

=== LSU (2021–present) ===
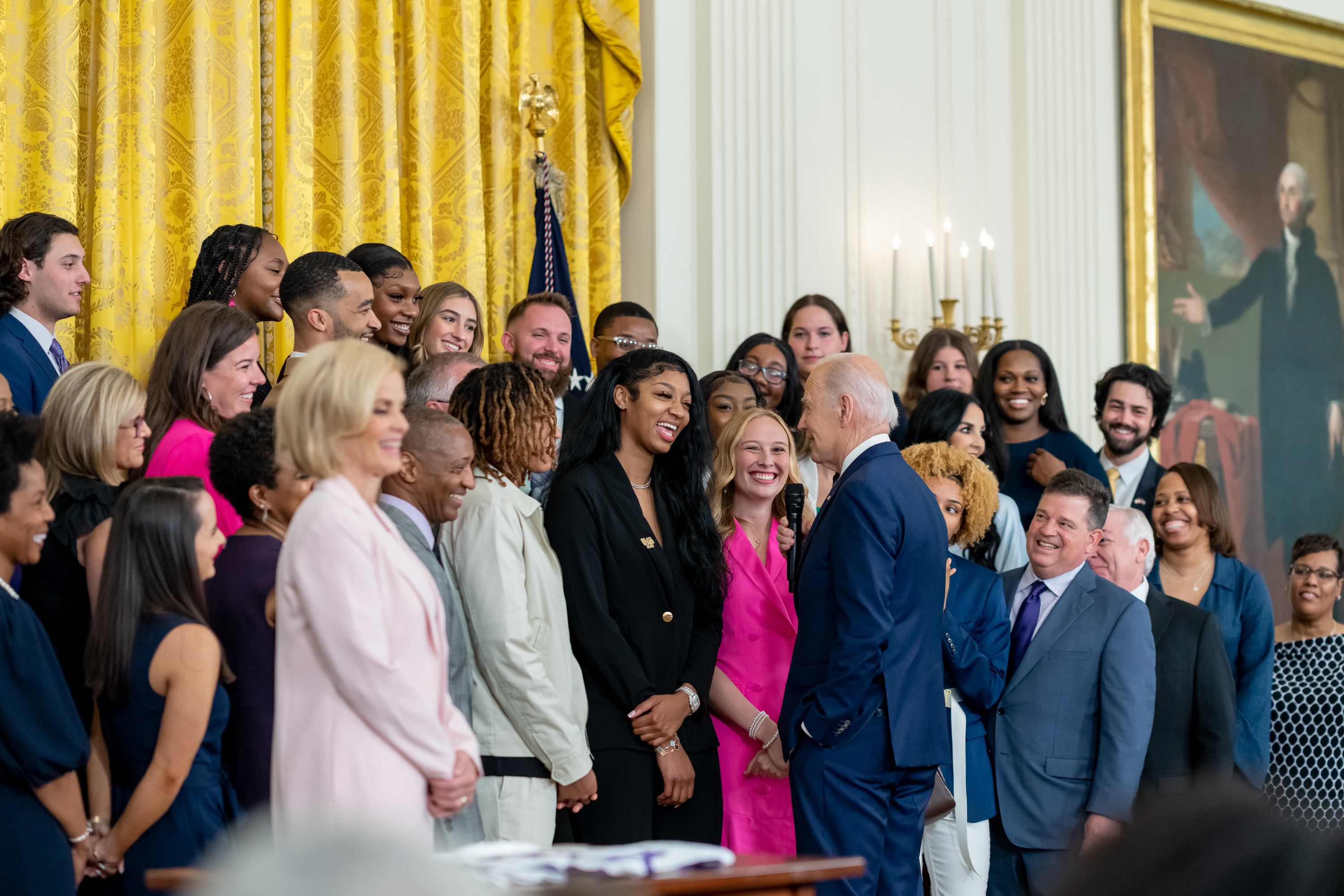
Mulkey (foreground left) at the White House event celebrating the LSU Tigers winning the 2022–23 NCAA National Championship

After 21 seasons at Baylor, Mulkey departed for LSU in April 2021. In her second season, she led the Tigers to win the national championship for her fourth lifetime win as head coach.

== Controversies ==
Mulkey has been the subject of several controversies during her coaching career. In 2013, star Baylor player Brittney Griner told ESPN that Mulkey advised student athletes to stay quiet about their sexual orientation, as being openly gay could hurt the reputation of the program at a religious school and inhibit recruiting efforts. Griner explained that while she respected Mulkey's coaching and the way Mulkey defended Griner from bullying, she did not appreciate Mulkey's request to cover her tattoos or delete social media posts about her girlfriend. Griner detailed the pain caused by this experience in her 2014 memoir. Several players defended Mulkey. In 2022, Mulkey received criticism when she refused to comment about Griner's detention in Russia.

In March 2024, Mulkey threatened to sue the Washington Post for an upcoming article she described as a "hit piece". She also criticized a Los Angeles Times column as sexist for describing her LSU team as "dirty debutantes". The writer apologized and the paper removed the term from the article for not meeting their editorial standards.

== Personal life ==
In 1987, Mulkey married Randy Robertson, whom she met at Louisiana Tech where he was the starting quarterback for the Bulldogs for the 1974 and 1975 seasons. They have two children together: son Kramer, a professional baseball player and collegiate All-American at Louisiana State University, and daughter McKenzie, who played both basketball and softball for Baylor. During her marriage to Robertson, she was known as Kim Mulkey-Robertson. Mulkey and Robertson divorced in 2006.

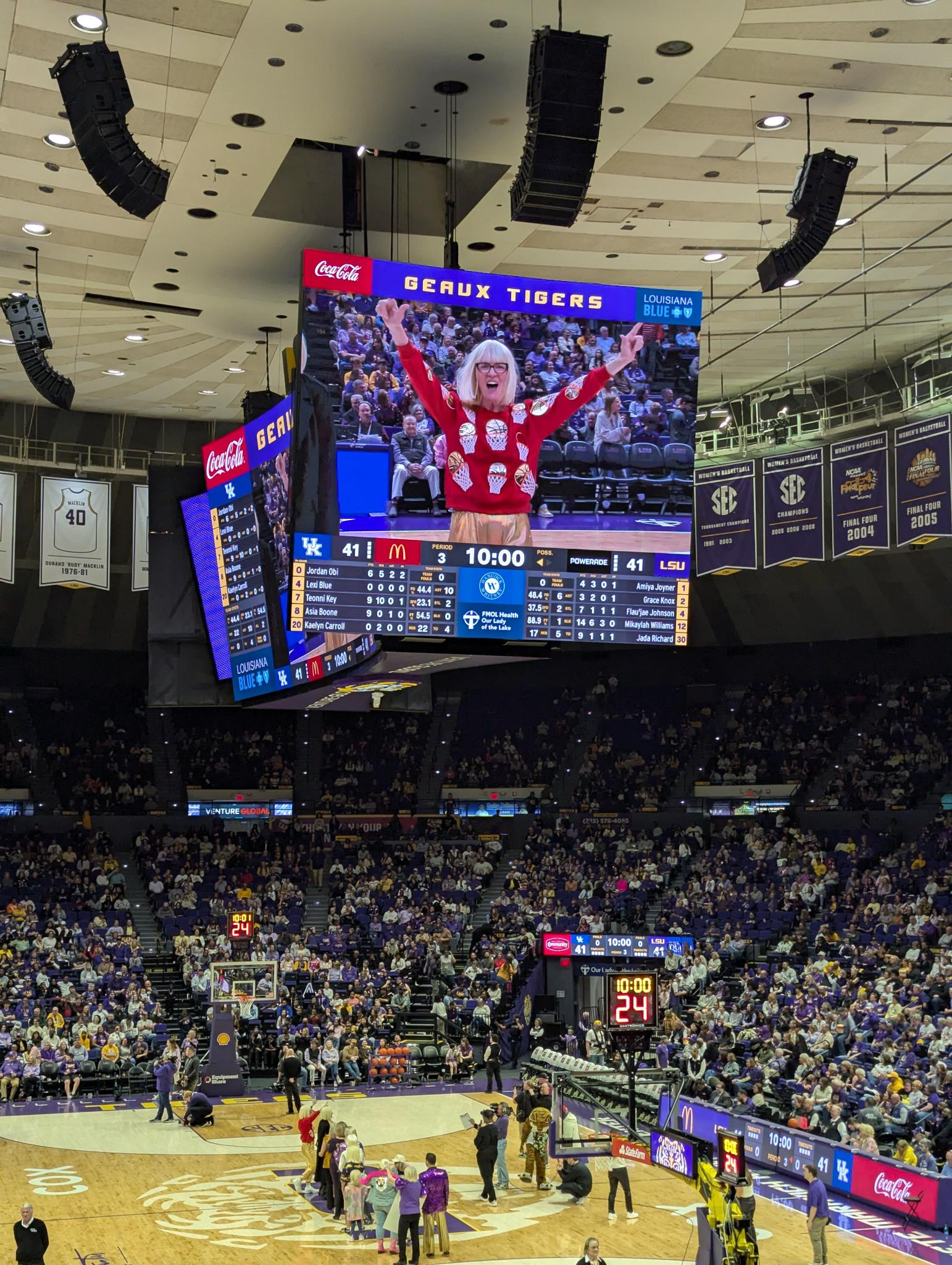
A fan shows off a blonde wig and patterned sweater during the annual LSU "Dress Like Kim Mulkey Night" competition

Mulkey is known for her exuberant fashion worn during games. She has said her style is inspired by Louisiana. Mulkey often wears outfits by Queen of Sparkles. She gets styling assistance from Jennifer Roberts, LSU's director of player personnel and influence.

== Head coaching record ==
Record table
Season	Team	Overall	Conference	Standing	Postseason
Baylor Lady Bears (Big 12 Conference) (2000–2021)
2000–01	Baylor	21–9	9–9	6th	NCAA First Round
2001–02	Baylor	27–6	12–4	2nd	NCAA Second Round
2002–03	Baylor	24–11	8–8	7th	WNIT Runner-up
2003–04	Baylor	26–9	10–6	T–4th	NCAA Sweet Sixteen
2004–05	Baylor	33–3	14–2	1st	NCAA Champions
2005–06	Baylor	26–7	12–4	2nd	NCAA Sweet Sixteen
2006–07	Baylor	26–8	11–5	3rd	NCAA Second Round
2007–08	Baylor	25–7	12–4	2nd	NCAA Second Round
2008–09	Baylor	29–6	12–4	2nd	NCAA Sweet Sixteen
2009–10	Baylor	27–10	9–7	6th	NCAA Final Four
2010–11	Baylor	34–3	15–1	1st	NCAA Elite Eight
2011–12	Baylor	40–0	18–0	1st	NCAA Champions
2012–13	Baylor	34–2	18–0	1st	NCAA Sweet Sixteen
2013–14	Baylor	32–5	16–2	T-1st	NCAA Elite Eight
2014–15	Baylor	33–4	16–2	1st	NCAA Elite Eight
2015–16	Baylor	36–2	17–1	1st	NCAA Elite Eight
2016–17	Baylor	33–4	17–1	1st	NCAA Elite Eight
2017–18	Baylor	33–2	18–0	1st	NCAA Sweet Sixteen
2018–19	Baylor	37–1	18–0	1st	NCAA Champions
2019–20	Baylor	28–2	17–1	1st	Postseason not held due to COVID-19
2020–21	Baylor	28–3	16–1	1st	NCAA Elite Eight
Baylor:		632–104 (.859)	291–61 (.827)		
LSU Tigers (Southeastern Conference) (2021–present)
2021–22	LSU	26–6	13–3	2nd	NCAA Second Round
2022–23	LSU	34–2	15–1	2nd	NCAA Champions
2023–24	LSU	31–6	13–3	2nd	NCAA Elite Eight
2024–25	LSU	31–6	12–4	3rd	NCAA Elite Eight
2025–26	LSU	29–6	12–4	4th	NCAA Sweet Sixteen
LSU:		151–26 (.853)	65–15 (.813)		
Total:		783–130 (.858)			
National champion Postseason invitational champion Conference regular season champion Conference regular season and conference tournament champion Division regular season champion Division regular season and conference tournament champion Conference tournament champion

=== National Championships ===
Year	Opponent	Score	Record
2005	Michigan State Spartans	84–62	33–3
2012	Notre Dame Fighting Irish	80–61	40–0
2019	Notre Dame Fighting Irish	82–81	37–1
2023	Iowa Hawkeyes	102–85	34–2
National Championships			4

== Awards and honors ==
- 2012 – Russell Athletic/WBCA National Coach of the Year
- 2012 – Associated Press College Basketball Coach of the Year
- 2019 – Associated Press College Basketball Coach of the Year
- 2021 – Associated Press College Basketball Coach of the Year

== See also ==
- List of college women's basketball career coaching wins leaders
