= 2004–05 NCAA Division I women's basketball rankings =

- Season: 2004–05
- NCAA Tournament: 2005
- Preseason No. 1: Tennessee
- NCAA Tournament Champions: Baylor
NCAA Division I women's basketball rankings
| |

Two human polls comprise the 2004–05 NCAA Division I women's basketball rankings, the AP Poll and the Coaches Poll, in addition to various publications' preseason polls. The AP poll is currently a poll of sportswriters, while the USA Today Coaches' Poll is a poll of college coaches. The AP conducts polls weekly through the end of the regular season and conference play, while the Coaches poll conducts a final, post-NCAA tournament poll as well.

== Legend ==
| – | No votes |
| (#) | Ranking |

== AP Poll ==
| Team | 15-Nov | 22-Nov | 29-Nov | 7-Dec | 14-Dec | 21-Dec | 28-Dec | 3-Jan | 10-Jan | 17-Jan | 24-Jan | 31-Jan | 7-Feb | 14-Feb | 21-Feb | 28-Feb | 7-Mar | 14-Mar |
|---|---|---|---|---|---|---|---|---|---|---|---|---|---|---|---|---|---|---|
| Stanford | 7 | 7 | 5 | 2 | 2 | 2 | 5 | 8 | 6 | 5 | 4 | 4 | 4 | 4 | 3 | 2 | 1 | 1 |
| LSU | 3 | 2 | 1 | 1 | 1 | 1 | 1 | 1 | 3 | 2 | 2 | 1 | 1 | 1 | 1 | 1 | 2 | 2 |
| Tennessee | 1 | 1 | 4 | 9 | 9 | 9 | 8 | 10 | 8 | 7 | 5 | 5 | 5 | 6 | 5 | 5 | 3 | 3 |
| North Carolina | 9 | 5 | 2 | 5 | 5 | 6 | 7 | 5 | 9 | 9 | 12 | 9 | 8 | 8 | 8 | 4 | 4 | 4 |
| Baylor | 8 | 9 | 9 | 6 | 6 | 5 | 3 | 3 | 2 | 4 | 7 | 8 | 7 | 7 | 6 | 7 | 6 | 5 |
| Michigan St. | 15 | 13 | 15 | 12 | 11 | 11 | 10 | 6 | 9 | 8 | 11 | 10 | 9 | 9 | 6 | 8 | 7 | 6 |
| Duke | 6 | 10 | 10 | 3 | 3 | 3 | 2 | 2 | 1 | 1 | 1 | 3 | 3 | 3 | 2 | 6 | 5 | 7 |
| Ohio St. | 10 | 11 | 11 | 10 | 10 | 10 | 9 | 9 | 5 | 3 | 3 | 2 | 2 | 2 | 4 | 3 | 8 | 8 |
| Rutgers | 17 | 17 | 16 | 20 | 22 | 24 | 24 | 14 | 4 | 6 | 8 | 7 | 11 | 10 | 9 | 9 | 9 | 9 |
| UConn | 4 | 8 | 8 | 8 | 8 | 8 | 11 | 15 | 16 | 13 | 9 | 11 | 10 | 11 | 11 | 14 | 13 | 10 |
| Notre Dame | 10 | 6 | 3 | 7 | 7 | 7 | 6 | 4 | 7 | 11 | 6 | 6 | 6 | 5 | 10 | 10 | 10 | 11 |
| Minnesota | 14 | 18 | 18 | 16 | 13 | 13 | 12 | 11 | 11 | 12 | 10 | 14 | 12 | 14 | 15 | 15 | 12 | 12 |
| Texas | 2 | 4 | 7 | 4 | 4 | 4 | 4 | 7 | 12 | 15 | 15 | 13 | 17 | 13 | 13 | 11 | 11 | 13 |
| Texas Tech | 12 | 12 | 12 | 13 | 12 | 12 | 13 | 12 | 13 | 10 | 13 | 12 | 13 | 15 | 14 | 13 | 14 | 14 |
| Temple | – | – | – | – | – | – | – | – | – | – | 24 | 22 | 20 | 17 | 16 | 16 | 15 | 15 |
| Kansas St. | 19 | 16 | 19 | 25 | 25 | 23 | 22 | 20 | 23 | 20 | 16 | 15 | 16 | 18 | 17 | 17 | 17 | 16 |
| DePaul | 20 | 19 | 17 | 15 | 21 | 19 | 19 | 19 | 22 | 18 | 17 | 17 | 15 | 12 | 12 | 12 | 16 | 17 |
| Vanderbilt | 13 | 14 | 13 | 14 | 17 | 16 | 15 | 16 | 17 | 17 | 23 | 21 | 21 | 22 | 20 | 18 | 19 | 18 |
| Iowa St. | – | – | – | – | – | – | – | 24 | 24 | 19 | 18 | 19 | 14 | 19 | 21 | 20 | 18 | 19 |
| Georgia | 5 | 3 | 6 | 11 | 15 | 15 | 16 | 17 | 18 | 21 | 19 | 18 | 18 | 16 | 18 | 21 | 21 | 20 |
| North Carolina St. | – | – | – | – | – | – | – | – | – | – | 25 | 25 | 23 | 21 | 19 | 19 | 20 | 21 |
| Penn St. | – | – | – | – | – | – | – | – | – | 22 | 23 | 25 | 24 | 22 | 23 | 22 | 22 | 22 |
| TCU | – | – | 23 | 23 | – | – | – | – | – | – | – | – | – | – | – | – | 25 | 23 |
| Green Bay | – | – | – | – | – | – | – | – | – | – | – | – | 24 | 23 | – | – | 24 | 24 |
| Boston College | 18 | 20 | 20 | 17 | 14 | 14 | 14 | 13 | 14 | 14 | 14 | 16 | 22 | 25 | 24 | 22 | 23 | 25 |
| Arizona | 24 | 25 | – | 24 | – | – | – | – | – | – | – | – | – | – | – | – | – | – |
| Arizona St. | – | – | – | – | 23 | – | 21 | – | – | – | – | – | – | – | – | – | – | – |
| Florida St. | – | – | – | – | – | – | – | – | – | – | 21 | 24 | – | – | – | – | – | – |
| Gonzaga | – | – | – | – | – | – | – | – | – | – | – | – | – | – | 25 | 24 | – | – |
| Houston | – | – | – | 22 | 19 | 22 | – | – | – | – | – | – | – | – | – | – | – | – |
| Iowa | – | – | – | – | 24 | 18 | 18 | 18 | 21 | 22 | – | – | – | – | – | – | – | – |
| Louisiana Tech | 25 | 23 | 21 | – | – | – | – | – | – | – | – | – | – | – | – | – | – | – |
| Maryland | 23 | 22 | 22 | 19 | 18 | 17 | 17 | 21 | 15 | 16 | 20 | 20 | 19 | 20 | 23 | 25 | – | – |
| New Mexico | – | – | – | – | – | – | 25 | 23 | – | – | – | – | – | – | – | – | – | – |
| Oklahoma | 22 | 21 | – | – | – | – | – | – | – | – | – | – | – | – | – | – | – | – |
| Purdue | 16 | 15 | 14 | 21 | 20 | 21 | 20 | 24 | 20 | 24 | – | – | – | – | – | – | – | – |
| UCLA | – | – | 25 | 18 | 16 | 20 | 23 | 22 | 19 | 25 | – | – | – | – | – | – | – | – |
| Utah | – | – | – | – | – | 25 | – | – | – | – | – | – | – | – | – | – | – | – |
| Villanova | – | 24 | 24 | – | – | – | – | – | – | – | – | – | – | – | – | – | – | – |
| Virginia Tech | – | – | – | – | – | – | – | 25 | 25 | 23 | – | – | – | – | – | – | – | – |

== USA Today Coaches poll ==
| Team | 2-Nov | 23-Nov | 30-Nov | 7-Dec | 14-Dec | 21-Dec | 28-Dec | 4-Jan | 11-Jan | 18-Jan | 25-Jan | 1-Feb | 8-Feb | 15-Feb | 22-Feb | 1-Mar | 8-Mar | 6-Apr |
|---|---|---|---|---|---|---|---|---|---|---|---|---|---|---|---|---|---|---|
| Baylor | 8 | 12 | 11 | 10 | 9 | 9 | 9 | 5 | 3 | 5 | 8 | 9 | 8 | 8 | 8 | 8 | 6 | 1 |
| Michigan St. | 15 | 14 | 15 | 12 | 11 | 11 | 10 | 6 | 9 | 8 | 11 | 10 | 9 | 9 | 7 | 7 | 5 | 2 |
| LSU | 2 | 2 | 1 | 1 | 1 | 1 | 1 | 1 | 2 | 2 | 1 | 1 | 1 | 1 | 1 | 1 | 4 | 3 |
| Tennessee | 1 | 1 | 5 | 9 | 10 | 10 | 8 | 10 | 10 | 9 | 6 | 5 | 5 | 6 | 5 | 4 | 3 | 4 |
| Stanford | 7 | 5 | 2 | 2 | 2 | 2 | 6 | 8 | 4 | 3 | 2 | 2 | 2 | 2 | 2 | 2 | 1 | 5 |
| North Carolina | 12 | 7 | 4 | 7 | 6 | 6 | 5 | 4 | 8 | 6 | 5 | 6 | 6 | 5 | 4 | 3 | 2 | 6 |
| Rutgers | 18 | 18 | 19 | 24 | – | – | – | 19 | 7 | 7 | 9 | 8 | 11 | 10 | 9 | 9 | 9 | 7 |
| Duke | 6 | 9 | 9 | 3 | 3 | 3 | 2 | 2 | 1 | 1 | 4 | 4 | 4 | 4 | 3 | 6 | 8 | 8 |
| Ohio St. | 9 | 10 | 10 | 6 | 7 | 7 | 7 | 9 | 5 | 4 | 3 | 3 | 3 | 3 | 6 | 5 | 7 | 9 |
| Minnesota | 16 | 17 | 18 | 16 | 13 | 12 | 12 | 11 | 12 | 13 | 12 | 16 | 13 | 14 | 15 | 15 | 13 | 11 |
| Georgia | 5 | 3 | 6 | 14 | 16 | 15 | 15 | 16 | 18 | 21 | 20 | 19 | 18 | 16 | 18 | 20 | 20 | 13 |
| Notre Dame | 10 | 6 | 3 | 5 | 5 | 5 | 4 | 3 | 6 | 10 | 7 | 7 | 7 | 7 | 10 | 10 | 12 | 15 |
| Arizona St. | – | – | – | – | 25 | – | 23 | 24 | 25 | – | – | – | – | – | – | – | 25 | 16 |
| Texas | 3 | 4 | 7 | 4 | 4 | 4 | 3 | 7 | 11 | 16 | 15 | 14 | 17 | 13 | 13 | 12 | 10 | 17 |
| Temple | – | – | – | – | – | – | – | – | – | – | 25 | 22 | 22 | 19 | 16 | 16 | 15 | 18 |
| Kansas St. | 19 | 16 | 17 | 22 | 22 | 21 | 21 | 20 | 22 | 18 | 16 | 15 | 16 | 17 | 17 | 18 | 17 | 19 |
| DePaul | 20 | 19 | 16 | 15 | 20 | 18 | 18 | 18 | 21 | 17 | 18 | 17 | 15 | 12 | 12 | 11 | 16 | 20 |
| Liberty | – | – | – | – | – | – | – | – | – | – | – | – | – | – | – | – | – | 21 |
| Southern California | – | – | – | – | – | – | – | – | – | – | – | – | – | – | – | – | – | 22 |
| Boston College | 17 | 20 | 21 | 18 | 19 | 16 | 16 | 15 | 14 | 14 | 13 | 13 | 19 | 22 | 23 | 22 | – | 23 |
| Maryland | 24 | 22 | 23 | 21 | 21 | 17 | 17 | 21 | 17 | 18 | 22 | 21 | 21 | 21 | 22 | – | – | 24 |
| Iowa St. | – | – | – | – | – | – | – | – | 24 | 20 | 17 | 18 | 14 | 18 | 20 | 19 | 19 | 25 |
| Arizona | 21 | 24 | 25 | 23 | – | 25 | 25 | – | – | – | – | – | – | – | – | – | – | – |
| Florida St. | – | – | – | – | – | – | – | – | – | 24 | 18 | 24 | 24 | 25 | – | – | – | – |
| Gonzaga | – | – | – | – | – | – | – | – | – | – | – | – | – | – | 25 | 23 | – | – |
| Green Bay | – | – | – | – | – | – | – | – | – | – | – | – | 23 | 23 | – | 25 | 21 | – |
| Houston | – | – | 24 | 17 | 15 | 22 | 22 | – | – | – | – | – | – | – | – | – | – | – |
| Iowa | – | – | – | – | 23 | 20 | 19 | 17 | 22 | 22 | – | 25 | – | – | – | – | – | – |
| Louisiana Tech | 22 | 21 | 20 | – | – | – | – | – | – | – | – | – | – | – | – | – | – | – |
| North Carolina St. | – | – | – | – | – | – | – | – | – | – | – | – | 24 | 24 | 21 | 21 | 22 | – |
| Oklahoma | 25 | 23 | – | – | – | – | – | – | – | – | – | – | – | – | – | – | – | – |
| Oregon | – | – | – | – | 24 | 24 | – | – | – | – | – | – | – | – | – | – | – | – |
| Penn St. | 23 | – | – | – | – | – | – | – | – | – | 23 | 23 | – | – | 24 | 24 | 23 | – |
| Purdue | 14 | 13 | 13 | 19 | 18 | 19 | 20 | 22 | 20 | 23 | 24 | – | – | – | – | – | – | – |
| UConn | 4 | 8 | 8 | 8 | 8 | 8 | 11 | 14 | 16 | 12 | 10 | 11 | 10 | 11 | 11 | 14 | 11 | 10 |
| Richmond | – | – | – | – | – | – | – | – | – | 25 | – | – | – | – | – | – | – | – |
| TCU | – | – | 22 | 25 | – | – | – | – | – | – | – | – | – | – | – | – | 24 | – |
