= Tennessee Mr. Basketball =

Honor awarded to high school basketball players

Each year the Tennessee Mr. Basketball award is given to the person chosen as the best high school boys' basketball player in the U.S. state of Tennessee by the Tennessee Secondary School Athletic Association. A Mr. Basketball is named for each of five divisions competing in Tennessee boys' basketball.

== Award winners ==
Year
Year	Class A		Class AA		Class AAA		Class AAAA		Division II A		Division II AA	
Year	Player	School	Player	School	Player	School	Player	School	Player	School	Player	School
1986	Sylvester Gray	Bolton	Charles "Cannon" Whitby	Obion County	Ron Huery	Whitehaven						
1987	Fitz Jones	East Robertson	Jerry Meyer	David Lipscomb	DeWayne Garner	Brainerd						
1988	Ronald Jones	Dresden	Jerry Meyer	David Lipscomb	Todd Day	Hamilton						
1989	Carlus Groves	East Robertson	Orlando Lightfoot	Chattanooga City	Darryl Miller	Oak Ridge						
1990	Eric Mitchell	Pickett County	Anfernee "Penny" Hardaway	Treadwell	David Vaughn	Whites Creek						
1991	Eugene Parris	Pickett County	Stanley Caldwell	Union City	David Vaughn	Whites Creek						
1992	Steve Hamer	Middleton	Stanley Caldwell	Union City	Tony Delk	Haywood						
1993	David Woodard	East Robertson	Ron Mercer	Goodpasture	Sylvester Ford	Fairley						
1993					Corrie Johnson	Hardin County						
1994	Ron Mercer	Goodpasture	Oliver Simmons	David Lipscomb	Edgar Perkins	White Station						
1995	Joseph Amonett	Pickett County	Oliver Simmons	David Lipscomb	Cedrick Wallace	Lawrence County						
1996	Sam Howard	Goodpasture	Joey Tuck	Macon County	Charles Hathaway	Hillwood						
1997	Kirk Haston	Perry County	Niki Arinze	Martin Luther King	Tony Harris	Memphis East						
1998	Adam Sonn	Donelson Christian Academy	Harris Walker	Brainerd	Vincent Yarbrough	Cleveland			Will Howard-Downs	University School of Nashville		
1999	Heath Hardin	Moore County	Terrence Woods	Treadwell	Brent Jolly	White County			Will Howard-Downs	University School of Nashville		
2000	Jason Holwerda	Chattanooga Christian	Cameron Crisp	Bolivar Central	Josh Hare	Bradley Central			David Harrison	Brentwood Academy		
2001	Jason Holwerda	Chattanooga Christian	Taureen Moy	BT Washington	Earnest Shelton	White Station			David Harrison	Brentwood Academy		
2002	Trey Pearson	South Fulton	Andre Allen	BT Washington	Demarco Polk	Stratford			Billy May	Father Ryan		
2003	Jake Skogen	Tennessee Temple	Andre Allen	BT Washington	Lee Humphrey	Maryville			Marc Gasol	Lausanne		
2004	Jonathan Cook	Chattanooga Christian	Corey Brewer	Portland	Jamont Gordon	Glencliff			Brandan Wright	Brentwood Academy		
2005	Nicchaeus Doaks	Peabody	Thaddeus Young	Mitchell	J. P. Prince	White Station			Brandan Wright	Brentwood Academy		
2006	Marquis Weddle	Union City	Willie Kemp	Bolivar Central	Barry Stewart	Shelbyville			Brandan Wright	Brentwood Academy		
2007	M. J. Brown	Union City	Jewuan Long	Liberty	Maurice Miller	Raleigh Egypt			Brandon Brown	Brentwood Academy		
2008	M. J. Brown	Union City	John Jenkins	Station Camp	Terrico White	Craigmont			Elliot Williams	St. George's	Leslie McDonald	Briarcrest
2009	Reginald Buckner	Manassas	John Jenkins	Station Camp	Drew Kelly	Centennial			Bobby Ray Parks Jr.	St. George's	Leslie McDonald	Briarcrest
2010	Malcolm Smith	Clarksville Academy	Jalen Steele	Fulton	Joe Jackson	White Station			Dwight Tarwater	Webb School	Jordan Price	McCallie School
2011	Malcolm Smith	Clarksville Academy	Kedren Johnson	Marshall County	Andre Hollins	White Station			John Ross Glover	University School of Jackson	Conor McDermott	Ensworth
2012	Martavious Newby	B.T. Washington	Craig Bradshaw	Christ Presbyterian Academy	Alex Poythress	Clarksville Northeast			John Ross Glover	University School of Jackson	Austin Nichols	Briarcrest
2013	Alex Fountain	Wartburg Central	Jalen Lindsey	Christ Presbyterian Academy	Nick King	Memphis East			Cameron Payne	Lausanne	Austin Nichols	Briarcrest
2014	Desonta Bradford	Humboldt	Braxton Blackwell	Christ Presbyterian Academy	Leron Black	White Station			Rob Marberry	Franklin Road Academy	Andrew Fleming	Ensworth
2015	Jeremiah Martin	Memphis Mitchell	Braxton Blackwell	Christ Presbyterian Academy	Dedric Lawson	Hamilton			Justin Wertner	St. George's	Micah Thomas	Briarcrest
2016	Nicholas Hopkins	Fayetteville	Bo Hodges	Maplewood	Alex Lomax	Memphis East			Chase Hayden	St. George's	Darius Garland	Brentwood Academy
2017	Tyreke Key	Clay County	Bo Hodges	Maplewood	Alex Lomax	Memphis East			Chase Hayden	St. George's	Darius Garland	Brentwood Academy
2018	Caden Mills	Van Buren County	Kadrion Johnson	Marshall County	Tyler Harris	Cordova			Keon Johnson	The Webb School	Darius Garland	Brentwood Academy
2019	Ja'Darius Harris	Peabody	Kadrion Johnson	Marshall County	James Wiseman	Memphis East			Keon Johnson	The Webb School	Kennedy Chandler	Briarcrest
2020	Ryley McClaran	Eagleville	Johnathan Lawson	Wooddale	Jacobi Wood	Cleveland			Moussa Cissé	Lausanne	Kennedy Chandler	Briarcrest
2021	Grant Strong	Clay County	Toris Woods	Bolivar Central	Mason Miller	Houston			Kameron Jones	Evangelical Christian	B. J. Edwards	Knoxville Catholic
2022	Grant Strong	Clay County	Gus Davenport	Cannon County	Ja'Kobi Gillespie	Greeneville	Brandon Miller	Cane Ridge	Tyler Byrd	Tipton-Rosemark	Chandler Jackson	Christian Brothers
2023	Rodgerick Robinson Jr.	Middleton	Jaylen Jones	East Nashville	Damarien Yates	Fayette-Ware	Jarred Hall	Lebanon	Isaiah West	Goodpasture	Lukas Walls	Webb School of Knoxville
2024	Jordan McCullum	Harriman	Jahvin Carter	Alcoa	Tyler Lee	Fulton	Emerson Tenner, Jr.	Cordova	Kavien Jones	BGA	Tyler Tanner	Brentwood Academy
2025	Auden Slaughter	Santa Fe	Ty Glasper	Gatlinburg-Pittman	Ty Cobb	Upperman	Taquez Butler	Whitehaven	Jayden Jones	Goodpasture Christian	Fred Smith, Jr.	Briarcrest Christian
2026	Will McCrary	Jackson County	Derrick Roberson	Chattanooga Preparatory School	Ty Cobb	Upperman	DJ Okoth	Bartlett	Chistopher Washington Jr.	Providence Christian Academy	Fred Smith Jr	Briarcrest Christian School

== See also ==
- Tennessee Miss Basketball
