= Tennessee Miss Basketball =

Each year the Tennessee Miss Basketball award is given to the person chosen as the best high school girls' basketball player in the U.S. state of Tennessee by the Tennessee Secondary School Athletic Association. A Miss Basketball is named for each of five divisions competing in Tennessee girls' basketball.

== Award winners ==
Year
Year	Class A		Class AA		Class AAA		Class AAAA		Division II A		Division II AA	
Year	Player	School	Player	School	Player	School	Player	School	Player	School	Player	School
1986	Lynn Stevenson	Richland	Amy Fuller	David Lipscomb	Sherelle Warren	Dyersburg						
1987	Kim Berry	Greenback	Amy Fuller	David Lipscomb	Angela Moorehead	Shelbyville						
1988	Mia Daniel	Collinwood	Debbie Hawhee	South Greene	Debbie Scott	Gallatin						
1989	Mia Daniel	Collinwood	Julie Powell	Cannon County	Misty Lamb	Shelbyville						
1990	Anne Cate	Memphis Prep	Julie Powell	Cannon County	Nikki McCray	Collierville						
1991	Heather Prater	Wayne County	Amy Brown	Livingston Academy	Tiffany Woosley	Shelbyville						
1992	Michelle Street	Bradford	Rachel Powell	Meigs County	Latina Davis	Franklin County						
1993	Michelle Street	Bradford	Rachel Powell	Meigs County	Tanika Smith	Knoxville Central						
1994	Brynae Laxton	Oneida	Misty Greene	Meigs County	Conswella Sparrow	Shelbyville						
1995	Andrea Hall	Clarkrange	Misty Greene	Meigs County	Conswella Sparrow	Shelbyville						
1996	Kara Sanders	Gleason	Sunday Watson	Livingston Academy	Erin McGinnis	Oak Ridge						
1997	Tonya Tuggles	Bradford	Becky Myatt	Hickman County	Erin McGinnis	Oak Ridge						
1998	Janet Holt	Moore County	Talisha Scates	Hickman County	Jennifer Wilson	Oak Ridge			Danna Simpson	Brentwood Academy		
1999	Ashley McElhiney	Gleason	Michelle Smith	Brainerd	Jennifer Wilson	Oak Ridge			Alana Smith	Girls Preparatory School		
2000	Jessica Henson	Bradford	Julie Aderhold	McMinn Central	Tenisha Gist	McMinn County			Alana Smith	Girls Preparatory School		
2001	Jenny Lannom	Bradford	Andrea Davidson	Jackson County	Brittany Jackson	Bradley Central			Ashley Earley	Briarcrest		
2002	Liz Strunk	Chattanooga Christian	Andrea Davidson	Jackson County	Ashley Johnson	Shelbyville			Becky Brown	Harpeth Hall		
2003	Merideth Richardson	Bradford	Kendall Cavin	Westview	Ashley Shields	Melrose			Jada Mincy	Briarcrest		
2004	Merideth Richardson	Bradford	Katrina Beechboard	Livingston Academy	Alex Fuller	Shelbyville			Sarah Baker	Harpeth Hall		
2005	Kristal Edney	Perry County	Bianca Thomas	Chester County	Alysha Clark	Mt. Juliet			Sarah Baker	Harpeth Hall		
2006	Alecia Weatherly	Perry County	Bianca Thomas	Chester County	Lakendra Phillips	Ridgeway			Alliesha Easley	Briarcrest		
2007	Kayla Hudson	Gleason	Gwen Delk	Jackson North Side	Anne Marie Lanning	Riverdale			Glory Johnson	Webb School of Knoxville		
2008	Abby Andrews	Collinwood	LaShay Davis	Upperman	Jasmine Hassell	Wilson Central			Lauren Avant	Lausanne	Glory Johnson	Webb School of Knoxville
2009	Laken Leonard	Jackson County	Lauren March	Marshall County	Jasmine Hassell	Wilson Central			Lauren Avant	Lausanne	Faith Dupree	Webb School of Knoxville
2010	Beth Hawn	Forrest	Chassidy Fussell	Obion County Central	Taylor Hall	Morristown-Hamblen West			Derica Wyatt	Franklin Road Academy	Paige Baechle	Pope John Paul II
2014	Jaycee Cole	Jackson County	Abbey Sissom	Cannon County	Alexa Middleton	Riverdale			Micah Sheetz	Webb School of Knoxville	Jasmine Cincore	Briarcrest Christian School
2015	Abbey Drew	Houston County	Kayla Marosites	Elizabethton	Crystal Dangerfield	Blackman			Kaylan Pugh	St. Mary's Episcopal School	Kaleigh Clemons	Baylor School
2016	Lakelyn Bouldin	Van Buren County	Kayla Marosites	Elizabethton	Crystal Dangerfield	Blackman			Micah Sheetz	Webb School of Knoxville	Kaleigh Clemons	Baylor School
2017	Kara Meadows	Clarkrange	Akira Levy	Upperman	Anastasia Hayes	Riverdale			Ashtyn Baker	Northpoint Christian School	Sydni Harvey	Brentwood Academy
2018	Courtney Pritchett	Pickett County	Akira Levy	Upperman	Rhyne Howard	Bradley Central			Ashton Hulme	University School of Jackson	Sydni Harvey	Brentwood Academy
2019	Chloe Moore-McNeil	Greenfield	Gracee Dishman	Cumberland County	Madison Hayes	East Hamilton			Casey Collier	Webb School of Knoxville	Dontavia Waggoner	Ensworth
2020	Chloe Moore-McNeil (2)	Greenfield	Keeley Carter	Macon County	Madison Hayes (2)	East Hamilton			Macey Lee	Trinity Christian	Dontavia Waggoner (2)	Ensworth
2021	Karly Weathers	Loretto	Reagan Hurst	Upperman	Denae Fritz	Maryville			Jordaynia Ivie	Lakeway Christian	Jaloni Cambridge	Ensworth
2022	Savannah Davis	McKenzie	Karly Weathers (2)	Loretto	Brooklyn Crouch	Upperman	Jennifer Sullivan	Bearden	Olivia Lee	Trinity Christian	Jaloni Cambridge (2)	Ensworth
2023	Blair Baugus	Wayne County	Jada Harrison	Westview	Ti'Mia Lawson	Jackson South Side	Avery Treadwell	Bearden	Angelica Velez	Webb School - Bell Buckle	Jaloni Cambridge (3)	Ensworth
2024	Savannah Davis (2)	McKenzie	Micah Hart	Gibson County	Celeste Reed	White County	Imari Berry	Clarksville	Haylen Ayers	University School of Jackson	Sydney Mains	Knoxville Catholic
