= Ashley McElhiney =

American basketball player-coach (born 1981)

Personal information
- Born: July 16, 1981 (age 45) Martin, Tennessee, U.S.
- Listed height: 5 ft 6 in (1.68 m)

Career information
- High school: Gleason (Gleason, Tennessee)
- College: Vanderbilt (1999–2003)
- WNBA draft: 2003: 3rd round, 35th overall pick
- Drafted by: Indiana Fever
- Position: Guard

Career history

Coaching
- 2004–2005: Nashville Rhythm

Career highlights
- Tennessee Miss Basketball (1999)
- Stats at Basketball Reference
Medals
Women's basketball
Representing the United States
World University Games
Gold medal – first place	2001 Beijing	Team competition

Ashley Renée Ayers (née McElhiney; born July 16, 1981) is an American basketball coach and former college player. She is best known for having been the first female coach of a male professional basketball team, as the coach of the Nashville Rhythm of the American Basketball Association in the 2004–05 season.

== Early life and playing career ==
Born in Martin, Tennessee, to parents Danny and Sandra McElhiney, she attended Gleason School in Gleason, Tennessee. As a senior, she averaged 17.7 points and 4.0 assists a game. She was the all-time leading scorer at Gleason School with 2,073 points and all-time assists leader with 604, with her points record only being broken 27 years later, in 2026, by Drake Lehmkuhl.

McElhiney was honored for her high school performance in 1999 as the Tennessee State 1A Miss Basketball.

She attended Vanderbilt University in Nashville, Tennessee, from 1999 to 2003 and was awarded the Most Outstanding Defensive Player in 2001, 2002, and 2003 at the position of guard. During that same time period, she was named as Tennessee State Amateur Athlete of the Year for 2002. She was also named as her team's 2001 co-MVP, along with her friend and teammate Chantelle Anderson.

In the 2003 WNBA draft, she was drafted as the third round selection of the Indiana Fever, but was released before playing any games.

== USA Basketball ==
McElhiney was selected to be a member of the team representing the USA at the 2001 World University Games held in Beijing, China. After winning the opening game easily, the USA team faced Canada and lost a close game 68–67. The USA team defeated Japan to earn a spot in the quarterfinals. The USA team fell behind by 12 points against undefeated Russia, but came back to win the game by 11 points. The next game was against the unbeaten host team China, and the USA team won 89–78. The USA team won their next two games to set up the gold medal game; a rematch against the host team. China would stay close early, but the USA team prevailed and won the gold medal with a score of 87–67. McElhiney averaged 1.6 points per game.

== Vanderbilt statistics ==
Legend
GP	Games played	GS	Games started	MPG	Minutes per game
FG%	Field goal percentage	3P%	3-point field goal percentage	FT%	Free throw percentage
RPG	Rebounds per game	APG	Assists per game	SPG	Steals per game
BPG	Blocks per game	PPG	Points per game	**Bold**	Career high

Year	Team	GP	Points	FG%	3P%	FT%	RPG	APG	SPG	BPG	PPG
1999-00	Vanderbilt	34	179	40.2	34.7	75.6	1.4	3.1	0.5	–	5.3
2000–01	Vanderbilt	31	309	45.4	40.8	**86.3**	2.1	6.2	**1.0**	0.0	**10.0**
2001–02	Vanderbilt	**37**	**315**	**46.1**	**43.3**	81.4	2.3	4.3	0.9	–	8.5
2002–03	Vanderbilt	30	290	40.1	41.2	76.6	**2.6**	**7.3**	0.9	0.0	9.7
Career	Vanderbilt	132	1093	43.2	40.8	80.5	2.1	5.1	0.8	0.0	8.3

== Coaching career ==
McElhiney has served as a teacher and assistant girls basketball coach at her alma mater, Gleason School, at both the junior high and high school level. Her husband, Joel Ayers, was the head coach. She also served as an assistant at the University of Tennessee at Chattanooga. She was hired as assistant coach of the Lady Mocs in July 2007. UTC was 29–4 with McElhiney on its bench. In July 2015 she was hired as an assistant girls basketball coach at Dyersburg High School in Dyersburg, Tennessee. In May 2021, she was hired as the assistant head coach for University School of Jackson.

=== Nashville Rhythm ===
McElhiney became the first female coach of a male professional basketball team in 2004, when she was hired to coach the American Basketball Association's Nashville Rhythm.

Her coaching career got off to a good start, with the Rhythm achieving a 9–2 record at the start of the season and McElhiney being reported to have the support of the male Rhythm players. Dontae' Jones, a former NBA player then with the Rhythm, was quoted as saying, "It's going to go a long way toward how women succeed from here on .... If I can help her continue to raise that bar, then I'm doing my job." Another Rhythm player, Adam Sonn, commented, "She comes in, and it's just normal. It's just a coach coaching."

The Rhythm's season was marred by an incident in which one of the team's co-owners, Sally Anthony, fired McElhiney in the middle of a game on January 29, 2005, on the grounds that McElhiney was playing Matt Freije after Anthony insisted that Freije be benched. McElhiney nevertheless finished coaching the game, which the Rhythm won. She was reinstated as coach by decision of the team's other two co-owners before the team's next game.

The Rhythm finished with a 21–10 record, qualifying for the playoffs and the chance to host a first-round playoff game. However, the team's owners chose to withdraw the team from the postseason, stating, "We've lost several players and felt we were not ready for the playoffs." McElhiney resigned as coach later the same week.

== Administrative career ==
In June 2005, McElhiney joined the athletic department staff at the University of Alabama as the director of women's basketball operations. Her former Vanderbilt University teammate Ashley Earley also joined as the graduate assistant coach.

== Personal life ==
McElhiney is married to Joel Ayers, formerly the head girls' basketball coach at Gleason School and Dyersburg High School. They have three children together, including consensus five-star recruit, Haylen Ayers.
