= Eads, Tennessee =

Unincorporated area in Tennessee, United States

Coordinates: 35°12′8.81″N 89°39′1.99″W

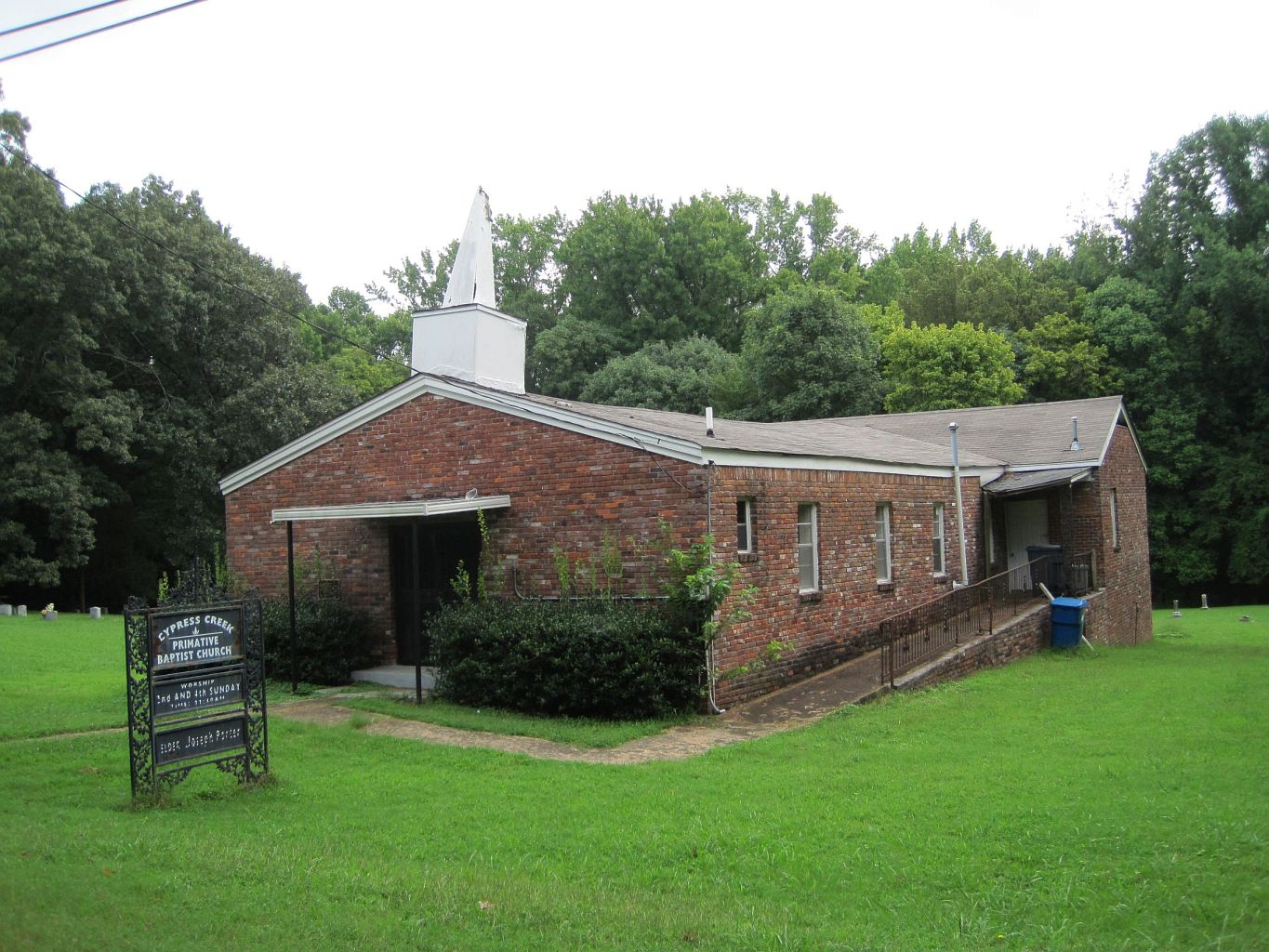
Cypress Creek Primitive Baptist Church in Eads

Eads is an unincorporated community in Shelby County, Tennessee, United States, named after Civil War engineer James Buchanan Eads. Some parts of Eads (and some surrounding areas) have been annexed by the city of Memphis. Some of its area is currently still unincorporated. Eads is located north of Collierville, west of Somerville, and east of Memphis and Bartlett. The Eads zip code (38028) stretches into both Shelby County and Fayette County, including parts of Hickory Withe and Fisherville. Major roads in the community include Winfield Dunn Parkway (Interstate 269), U.S. Route 64, Collierville-Arlington Road/Airline Road (Tennessee State Route 205), and Seward Road.

== History ==
The community of Eads was founded in 1888, when the Tennessee Midland Railroad tracks of Tennessee were laid out through a village that was known as Sewardville.

After a seven-year court challenge to the right of Memphis to annex, small portions of Eads were annexed into the Memphis City Council Second District in the 1990s. Most of Eads is now designated as being in the Memphis reserve, meaning that Memphis can annex it at some point.

On January 1, 2020, a portion of Eads on the south side of US 64 and just north of the Grays Creek community, between west of Cobb Road and the unincorporated Shelby County boundary line was deannexed from the City of Memphis to return under county jurisdiction.

== Education ==
Most of Eads is serviced by the Shelby County School System. The private Briarcrest Christian School also has a campus in Eads.

== Geography ==
The center of Eads is located at 35°12'09" North, 89°39'02" West.

== Notable people ==
- Tyler Badie – NFL player
- Kennedy Chandler – NBA player
- Hugh Freeze – college football coach
- Greg Hardy – NFL player, professional mixed martial artist
- Jim Mabry – NCAA All-American college football player
- Leslie McDonald – former college and semi-pro basketball player
- Austin Nichols – former college basketball player
- Michael Oher – NFL player
- Lisa Quinn – artist, actress, designer
- Jabari Small – NFL player
- Leigh Anne Tuohy – interior designer
