= Haylen Ayers =

American basketball player (born 2008)

No. 20 – USJ Lady Bruins
- Position: Shooting guard

Personal information
- Born: 26 June 2008 (age 18)
- Listed height: 6 ft 1 in (1.85 m)

Career information
- High school: University School of Jackson (Jackson, Tennessee)

Career highlights
- 3× Tennessee Miss Basketball (2024–2026)
Medals
Women's basketball
Representing United States
FIBA U18 Women's AmeriCup
Gold medal – first place	2026 Mexico	Team

Haylen Ayers (born June 26, 2008) is an American basketball player who currently attends University School of Jackson in Jackson, Tennessee. She is a consensus five-star recruit and one of the top-ranked players in the 2027 class.

== Early life ==
Haylen Ayers was born on June 26, 2008. Her parents, Joel Ayers and Ashley McElhiney, were basketball coaches, so she grew up immersed in the game, with her mother stating: "Her basic IQ of the game goes back when she was three years old." When she was in the sixth grade, Ayers was spotted by Christian Simmons, a pro basketball trainer who took her under his wing. "She stood out because of her frame," said Simmons, who started working with her from thereon out.

Ayers attends University School of Jackson (USJ) in Jackson, Tennessee, where she plays basketball with her father as the head coach and her mother as an assistant. She starred on the varsity team as an eighth grader, earning Division II-A all-state honors from the Tennessee Sports Writers Association (TSWA). As a freshman, Ayers led the USJ Lady Bruins to their first-ever state championship, recording 30 points, 12 rebounds, and six assists in a 70–58 triple-overtime win over Goodpasture Christian School in the Tennessee Secondary School Athletic Association (TSSAA) Division II-A title game. In addition to garnering all-state honors by the TSWA, she was named Tennessee Miss Basketball for Division II-A.

As a sophomore, Ayers averaged 21.8 points, 8.3 rebounds, and 3.7 assists per game and won both the Tennessee Miss Basketball and the Tennessee Gatorade Player of the Year awards. She led USJ to the Division II-A state semifinals, where she posted 40 points and 13 rebounds in a 64–57 double-overtime loss to The Webb School. As a junior, Ayers averaged 21.9 points, 6.9 rebounds, and 2.9 assists per game, and led the Lady Bruins to an appearance in Division II-A state championship game, where she scored a game-high 24 points in a 60–49 loss to Providence Christian Academy. She collected her third straight Tennessee Miss Basketball award in addition to being named the MaxPreps Tennessee Player of the Year.

Aside from basketball, Ayers also plays softball at USJ. As a freshman in 2024, she helped the Lady Bruins to an appearance in the state championship game, earning all-state honors from the TSWA. Ayers repeated as an all-state honoree as a sophomore.

=== Recruiting ===
Ayers is a consensus five-star recruit and one of the top players in the 2027 class, according to major recruiting services. She received over two dozen college offers by the end of her freshman season, including LSU, South Carolina, and Tennessee. On October 31, 2025, Ayers narrowed down her list of 30 offers down to her top five: Duke, Kentucky, Texas, UConn, and Vanderbilt. On November 16, 2026, she selected Vanderbilt over UConn.

Ayers is also a highly-ranked softball recruit.

== National team career ==
Ayers won a gold medal with the United States at the 2026 FIBA U18 Women's AmeriCup in Mexico. She averaged 8.5 points, 3.8 rebounds, and three assists per game.

== Personal life ==
Her mother, Ashley (née McElhiney) Ayers, played college basketball at Vanderbilt and became the first woman to coach a men's professional basketball team before she was inducted into the Tennessee Sports Hall of Fame. Her cousin, McCall Sims, plays college softball at Tennessee; the two were close growing up and played travel basketball together in their youth.

In October 2025, as a high school junior, Ayers signed a Name, Image and Likeness (NIL) deal with New Balance. Just a few days after the announcement, she hosted her first free youth basketball camp with the help of her father, her trainer, and other players, drawing over 100 children. In February 2026, Ayers helped put on a girls' youth clinic with New Balance in Los Angeles during NBA All-Star Weekend.

Ayers has spoken about the importance of mental health and of finding one's identity outside of sports.
