= Keyron Crawford =

American football player (born 2003)

No. 42 – Las Vegas Raiders
- Position: Defensive end
- Roster status: Injured reserve

Personal information
- Born: October 17, 2003 (age 23); Memphis, Tennessee, U.S.
- Listed height: 6 ft 4 in (1.93 m)
- Listed weight: 253 lb (115 kg)

Career information
- High school: Briarcrest Christian School (Eads, Tennessee)
- College: Arkansas State (2022–2023); Auburn (2024–2025)
- NFL draft: 2026: 3rd round, 67th overall pick

Career history
- Las Vegas Raiders (2026–present)

Awards and highlights
- Third-team All-SEC (2025)
- Stats at Pro Football Reference

Keyron Crawford (born October 17, 2003) is an American professional football defensive end for the Las Vegas Raiders of the National Football League (NFL). He played college football for the Arkansas State Red Wolves and the Auburn Tigers and was selected by the Raiders in the third round of the 2026 NFL draft.

== Early life ==
Crawford attended Raleigh-Egypt High School in Memphis, Tennessee, for three years before transferring to Briarcrest Christian School in Eads, Tennessee, for his senior year. He played basketball in high school and did not start playing football until his senior year. In that season, he was named the regional defensive MVP after recording 78 tackles and 14 sacks.

== College career ==
=== Arkansas State ===
As a true freshman at Arkansas State University in 2022, Crawford played in 10 games and had 14 tackles. As a sophomore in 2023, he started all 13 games at defensive end and had 44 tackles and 5.5 sacks.

=== Auburn ===
After the season, Crawford transferred to Auburn University. In his first season at Auburn in 2024, he had 22 tackles over 12 games. As a senior in 2025, Crawford became a starter at linebacker.

== Professional career ==
Pre-draft measurables
| Height | Weight | Arm length | Hand span | Wingspan |
|---|---|---|---|---|
| 6 ft 4 3/8 in (1.94 m) | 253 lb (115 kg) | 32 in (0.81 m) | 9 in (0.23 m) | 6 ft 7 1/8 in (2.01 m) |
All values from NFL Combine

Crawford was selected by the Las Vegas Raiders with the 67th overall pick in the third round of the 2026 NFL draft. He was placed on season–ending injured reserve due to an Achilles injury on August 30, 2026.
