= 2005 SEC women's basketball tournament =

Tournament in South Carolina, US

- Classification: Division I
- Teams: 12
- Site: Bon Secours Wellness Arena; Greenville, South Carolina
- Champions: Tennessee Lady Vols (11th title)
- Winning coach: Pat Summitt (11th title)

2004–05 SEC women's basketball standings
	Conf.				Overall
Team	W		L	PCT	W		L	PCT
No. 2 LSU	14	–	0	1.000	33	–	3	.917
No. 3 Tennessee^{†}	13	–	1	.929	30	–	5	.857
No. 18 Vanderbilt	10	–	4	.714	24	–	8	.750
No. 20 Georgia	9	–	5	.643	24	–	10	.706
Ole Miss	8	–	6	.571	19	–	11	.633
Mississippi State	6	–	8	.429	17	–	12	.586
Auburn	6	–	8	.429	16	–	13	.552
Florida	5	–	9	.357	14	–	15	.483
Alabama	4	–	10	.286	14	–	15	.483
Kentucky	4	–	10	.286	18	–	16	.529
Arkansas	3	–	11	.214	17	–	14	.548
South Carolina	2	–	12	.143	8	–	21	.276
† 2005 SEC tournament winner Rankings from AP poll

The 2005 SEC women's basketball tournament took place March 3–6, 2005, at the Bi-Lo Center, now known as Bon Secours Wellness Arena, in Greenville, South Carolina.

Tennessee won the tournament by beating LSU in the championship game.

== Tournament ==
First round
Kentucky	57
Auburn	62
Mississippi State	73
Arkansas	80
Florida	58
Alabama	62
South Carolina	50
Ole Miss	53

Second round
Auburn	54
Tennessee	64
Arkansas	60
Vanderbilt	79
Alabama	59
LSU	60
Ole Miss	65
Georgia	87

Semifinals
Vanderbilt	73
Tennessee	76
Georgia	65
LSU	79

Championship game
LSU	65
Tennessee	67

Asterisk denotes game ended in overtime.

== All-Tournament team ==
- Tasha Humphrey, Georgia
- Seimone Augustus, LSU
- Temeka Johnson, LSU
- Armintie Price, Ole Miss
- Shyra Ely, Tennessee (MVP)
- Brittany Jackson, Tennessee
- Shanna Zolman, Tennessee
- Ashley Earley, Vanderbilt
