= Kennedy Chandler =

American basketball player (born 2002)

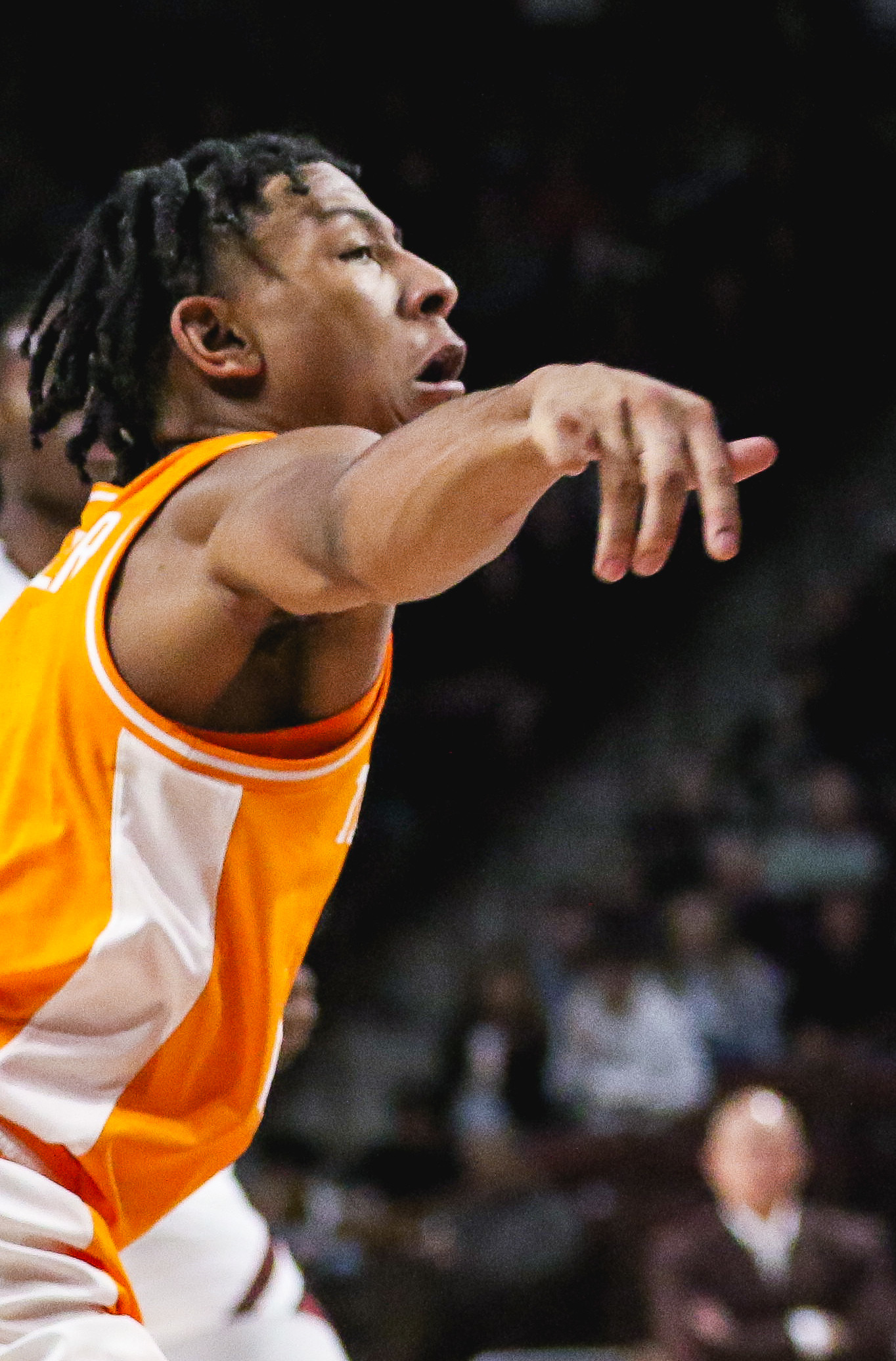
- Chandler with Tennessee in 2022

No. 12 – Valley Suns
- Position: Point guard
- League: NBA G League

Personal information
- Born: September 16, 2002 (age 24) Memphis, Tennessee, U.S.
- Listed height: 6 ft 0 in (1.83 m)
- Listed weight: 170 lb (77 kg)

Career information
- High school: Briarcrest Christian School (Eads, Tennessee); Sunrise Christian Academy (Bel Aire, Kansas)
- College: Tennessee (2021–2022)
- NBA draft: 2022: 2nd round, 38th overall pick
- Drafted by: San Antonio Spurs
- Playing career: 2022–present

Career history
- 2022–2023: Memphis Grizzlies
- 2022–2023: →Memphis Hustle
- 2023–2024: Long Island Nets
- 2024–2025: Raptors 905
- 2025–2026: Delaware Blue Coats
- 2026: Utah Jazz
- 2026–present: Valley Suns

Career highlights
- Second-team All-SEC (2022); SEC All-Freshman Team (2022); SEC tournament MVP (2022); McDonald's All-American (2021); Nike Hoop Summit (2021); 2× Tennessee Mr. Basketball (2019, 2020)
- Stats at NBA.com
- Stats at Basketball Reference
Medals
Men's basketball
Representing the United States
FIBA Under-19 World Cup
Gold medal – first place	2021 Latvia	Team

Kennedy Collier Chandler (born September 16, 2002) is an American professional basketball player for the Valley Suns of the NBA G League. He played college basketball for the Tennessee Volunteers. He was a consensus five-star recruit and one of the top point guards in the 2021 class. In his senior season of high school, he was named a McDonald's All-American, as well as being selected to the rosters of the Jordan Brand Classic and the Nike Hoop Summit.

In his only season at Tennessee, Chandler was named to second-team All-Southeastern Conference (SEC) and the SEC all-freshman team. He was drafted with the 38th overall pick in the 2022 NBA draft by the San Antonio Spurs, but was later traded to the Grizzlies.

== High school career ==
Chandler began playing varsity basketball for Briarcrest Christian School in Eads, Tennessee while in eighth grade. As a freshman, he came off the bench and helped his team reach the Division II-AA semifinals. In his sophomore season, Chandler averaged 19.5 points, four rebounds and 3.1 assists per game. He led Briarcrest to the DII-AA state title, earning tournament most valuable player honors after scoring 20 points in a 65–54 win over Brentwood Academy. He was named DII-AA Tennessee Mr. Basketball. After the season, Chandler won the Nike Elite Youth Basketball League Peach Jam with Mokan Elite. As a junior, he averaged 22.2 points, 4.3 assists and 2.6 steals per game, leading his team to a state runner-up finish and being named DII-AA Tennessee Mr. Basketball for his second straight year. Chandler transferred to Sunrise Christian Academy in Bel Aire, Kansas for his senior season to help prepare for the college level. As a senior, he averaged 14.8 points, 4.2 rebounds and 3.3 steals per game, leading his team to a 21–4 record. Chandler was named to the rosters for the McDonald's All-American Game, Jordan Brand Classic and Nike Hoop Summit.

=== Recruiting ===
Chandler received basketball scholarship offers from Florida, Arizona State and Ole Miss, among others, during his first two years of high school. He emerged as a five-star recruit prior to his junior season. On August 14, 2020, Chandler committed to playing college basketball for Tennessee over offers from Duke, Kentucky, North Carolina and Memphis.

College recruiting
Name	Hometown	School	Height	Weight	Commit date
Kennedy Chandler; PG	Memphis, TN	Sunrise Christian Academy (KS)	6 ft 1 in (1.85 m)	165 lb (75 kg)	Aug 14, 2020
Kennedy Chandler; PG	Recruit ratings: Rivals: 247Sports: ESPN: (95)				
Overall recruit ranking: Rivals: 9 247Sports: 10 ESPN: 10
Note: In many cases, Scout, Rivals, 247Sports, On3, and ESPN may conflict in their listings of height and weight.; In these cases, the average was taken. ESPN grades are on a 100-point scale.; Sources: "Tennessee 2021 Basketball Commitments". Rivals.; "2021 Tennessee Volunteers Recruiting Class". ESPN.; "2021 Team Ranking". Rivals.

== College career ==
In his college debut, Chandler posted 20 points and four assists in a 90–62 win against UT Martin. On December 4, 2021, he scored 28 points in a 69–54 win over Colorado. Chandler was named to the Second Team All-SEC as well as the All-Freshman Team. He averaged 13.9 points, 4.7 assists and 2.2 steals per game. On April 5, 2022, Chandler declared for the 2022 NBA draft, forgoing his remaining college eligibility. Chandler was a projected top twenty pick in the 2022 NBA draft.

== Professional career ==
=== Memphis Grizzlies (2022–2023) ===
Chandler was drafted in the second round with the 38th overall pick by the San Antonio Spurs in the 2022 NBA draft. On June 24, 2022, a day after the draft, he was traded to the Memphis Grizzlies in exchange for a 2024 second-round pick. On July 6, Chandler signed a four-year, $7.1 million rookie scale contract with the Grizzlies. The deal set a record for the most guaranteed money ($4.9 million) given to an American-born second-round draft pick on his rookie contract. He joined the Grizzlies for the 2022 NBA Summer League. Chandler made his Summer League debut on July 5, recording eight points, four rebounds, four assists, four steals and three blocks in a 103–99 win over the Philadelphia 76ers. On October 22, he made his NBA debut, recording two assists and two blocks in a 137–96 loss to the Dallas Mavericks. Chandler made 36 appearances for Memphis during the 2022–23 NBA season, posting averages of 2.2 points, 1.1 rebounds, and 1.6 assists. On April 8, 2023, Chandler was waived by the Grizzlies.

=== Long Island Nets (2023–2024) ===
On October 19, 2023, Chandler signed with the Brooklyn Nets, but was waived two days later. On October 28, he joined the Long Island Nets.

=== Raptors 905 (2024–2025) ===
On September 25, 2024, Chandler signed with the Toronto Raptors, but was waived the same day. On October 28, he joined Raptors 905.

=== Utah Jazz (2026) ===
On March 21, 2026, Chandler signed a 10-day contract with the Utah Jazz. On April 1, following the expiry of his initial deal, the Jazz signed Chandler to a second 10-day contract. On April 7, Chandler recorded a career-high 31 points, seven rebounds, and eight assists in a 137–156 loss to the New Orleans Pelicans. He made 11 total appearances for Utah, recording averages of 15.0 points, 3.4 rebounds, and 6.7 assists.

== National team career ==
Chandler represented the United States at the 2021 FIBA Under-19 World Cup in Latvia. He averaged 7.7 points and 3.4 assists per game, helping his team win the gold medal.

== Career statistics ==
Legend
GP	Games played	GS	Games started	MPG	Minutes per game
FG%	Field goal percentage	3P%	3-point field goal percentage	FT%	Free throw percentage
RPG	Rebounds per game	APG	Assists per game	SPG	Steals per game
BPG	Blocks per game	PPG	Points per game	**Bold**	Career high

=== NBA ===
Year	Team	GP	GS	MPG	FG%	3P%	FT%	RPG	APG	SPG	BPG	PPG
2022–23	Memphis	**36**	0	7.8	.422	.133	.462	1.1	1.6	.3	.1	2.2
2025–26	Utah	11	**2**	**32.3**	**.445**	**.395**	**.651**	**3.4**	**6.7**	**1.0**	**.2**	**15.0**
Career		47	2	13.5	.436	.321	.607	1.6	2.8	.5	.1	5.2

=== College ===
Year	Team	GP	GS	MPG	FG%	3P%	FT%	RPG	APG	SPG	BPG	PPG
2021–22	Tennessee	34	34	30.8	.464	.383	.606	3.2	4.7	2.2	.2	13.9
