= Tyler Badie =

American football player (born 2000)

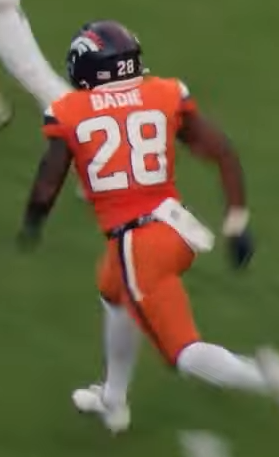
- Badie with the Denver Broncos in 2025

No. 28 – Denver Broncos
- Positions: Running back, Kickoff returner
- Roster status: Injured reserve

Personal information
- Born: February 7, 2000 (age 26); New Orleans, Louisiana, U.S.
- Listed height: 5 ft 8 in (1.73 m)
- Listed weight: 197 lb (89 kg)

Career information
- High school: The Park School of Baltimore Briarcrest Christian (Eads, Tennessee)
- College: Missouri (2018–2021)
- NFL draft: 2022: 6th round, 196th overall pick

Career history
- Baltimore Ravens (2022)*; Denver Broncos (2022–present)
- * Offseason or practice squad member only

Awards and highlights
- Second-team All-American (2021); First-team All-SEC (2021)

Career NFL statistics as of Week 3, 2026
- Rushing attempts: 22
- Rushing yards: 112
- Receptions: 26
- Receiving yards: 203
- Receiving touchdowns: 1
- Return yards: 536
- Stats at Pro Football Reference

Tyler Badie (/bəˈdeɪ/ bə-DAY; born February 7, 2000) is an American professional football running back and kickoff returner for the Denver Broncos of the National Football League (NFL). He played college football for the Missouri Tigers.

== Early life ==
Badie was born and lived in New Orleans until his family was displaced by Hurricane Katrina in 2005 and moved to Randallstown, Maryland. Growing up, he was a sprinter for the Owings Mills Track Club and competed in the 2011 AAU Junior Olympics. Badie was also a lacrosse player, originally planning to play in college. He attended the Friends School of Baltimore for his freshman and sophomore year(s) of highschool. Badie's family moved to Memphis, Tennessee following his junior year of high school after his mother accepted a job there and he transferred to Briarcrest Christian School. As a junior, Badie rushed for 400 yards and three touchdowns on 40 carries. Badie rushed the ball 193 times for 1,186 yards and scored 18 touchdowns in his senior season.

== College career ==
Badie played in 12 games as a freshman and finished the season with 437 yards and two touchdowns on 89 carries and 809 all-purpose yards and was named to the Southeastern Conference (SEC) All-Freshman team. He rushed for 457 yards and led Missouri with 32 receptions for 356 yards and five touchdowns. As a junior, Badie rushed for 242 yards on 48 attempts with four touchdowns while also catching 28 passes for 333 yards and two touchdowns. In the 2021 season, he had five games with over 200 rushing yards.

=== Statistics ===
Year	School	Conf	Class	Pos	G	Rushing				Receiving			
Year	School	Conf	Class	Pos	G	Att	Yds	Avg	TD	Rec	Yds	Avg	TD
2018	Missouri	SEC	FR	RB	12	89	437	4.9	2	12	130	10.8	0
2019	Missouri	SEC	SO	FB	12	108	457	4.2	3	32	356	11.1	5
2020	Missouri	SEC	JR	RB	10	48	242	5.0	4	28	333	11.9	2
2021	Missouri	SEC	SR	RB	12	268	1,604	6.0	14	54	330	6.1	4
Career					46	513	2,740	5.3	23	126	1,149	9.1	11

=== College awards and honors ===
- Second-team All-American (2021)
- First-team All-SEC (2021)

== Professional career ==
Pre-draft measurables
Height	Weight	Arm length	Hand span	Wingspan	40-yard dash	10-yard split	20-yard split	20-yard shuttle	Three-cone drill	Vertical jump	Broad jump	Bench press
5 ft 8 in (1.73 m)	197 lb (89 kg)	29 3/8 in (0.75 m)	9 1/8 in (0.23 m)	5 ft 11 3/8 in (1.81 m)	4.45 s	1.54 s	2.60 s	4.28 s	7.07 s	33.5 in (0.85 m)	10 ft 1 in (3.07 m)	14 reps
All values from NFL Combine/Pro Day

=== Baltimore Ravens ===
Badie was selected by the Baltimore Ravens in the sixth round, 196th overall, of the 2022 NFL draft. He was waived on August 30, 2022, and signed to the practice squad the next day.

=== Denver Broncos ===
On December 29, 2022, Badie was signed by the Denver Broncos off the practice squad of the Ravens. Badie made his NFL debut in Week 18 against the Los Angeles Chargers. In the game, he scored a 24–yard touchdown off of a Russell Wilson pass, his first NFL touch, and touchdown.

On August 29, 2023, Badie was waived by the Broncos and re-signed to the practice squad. He signed a reserve/future contract on January 8, 2024.

On August 27, 2024, Badie was waived by the Broncos. The next day, he was re-signed to the practice squad. On September 14, Badie was elevated for the Broncos' Week 2 contest against the Pittsburgh Steelers. In the game, Badie played 3 offensive snaps, recording one reception for 2 yards and one rush for 16 yards. He was again elevated for the team's Week 3 victory against the Tampa Bay Buccaneers, where he led the team in rushing with 70 yards on 9 carries. On September 25, the Broncos formally signed Badie to their active roster.

Following a back injury in Week 4 against the New York Jets, Badie was placed on injured reserve on October 5. On December 24, he was designated for return.

On March 6, 2026, the Broncos placed an ERFA tender on Badie worth $1.075 million. On October 24, he was placed on injured reserve after sustaining a thumb injury in Week 6 against the Seattle Seahawks.
