= 2004–05 Tennessee Lady Volunteers basketball team =

2004–05 Tennessee Lady Volunteers basketball season

2004–05 Tennessee Lady Volunteers basketball

SEC tournament champions

NCAA tournament, Final Four
- Conference: Southeastern Conference

Ranking
- Coaches: No. 4
- AP: No. 3
- Record: 30–5 (13–1 SEC)
- Head coach: Pat Summitt (31st season)
- Assistant coaches: Mickie DeMoss; Holly Warlick
- Home arena: Thompson–Boling Arena

2004–05 SEC women's basketball standings
	Conf.				Overall
Team	W		L	PCT	W		L	PCT
No. 2 LSU	14	–	0	1.000	33	–	3	.917
No. 3 Tennessee^{†}	13	–	1	.929	30	–	5	.857
No. 18 Vanderbilt	10	–	4	.714	24	–	8	.750
No. 20 Georgia	9	–	5	.643	24	–	10	.706
Ole Miss	8	–	6	.571	19	–	11	.633
Mississippi State	6	–	8	.429	17	–	12	.586
Auburn	6	–	8	.429	16	–	13	.552
Florida	5	–	9	.357	14	–	15	.483
Alabama	4	–	10	.286	14	–	15	.483
Kentucky	4	–	10	.286	18	–	16	.529
Arkansas	3	–	11	.214	17	–	14	.548
South Carolina	2	–	12	.143	8	–	21	.276
† 2005 SEC tournament winner Rankings from AP poll

The 2004–05 Tennessee Lady Volunteers basketball team represented the University of Tennessee as a member of the Southeastern Conference during the 2004–05 women's college basketball season. Coached by Pat Summitt, the Lady Volunteers played their home games at Thompson–Boling Arena in Knoxville, Tennessee. The team won the SEC tournament title, reached the Final Four of the NCAA tournament, and finished the season with a 30–5 record (13–1 SEC).

== Roster ==
2004–05 Tennessee Lady Volunteers women's basketball team
Players
Coaches

Pos.	#	Name	Height	Year	Previous school	Hometown
F	1	Sidney Spencer	6 ft 3 in (1.91 m)	So	Hoover	Hoover, AL
G	5	Shanna Zolman	5 ft 10 in (1.78 m)	Jr	Wawasee	Syracuse, Indiana
F	13	Dominique Redding	6 ft 1 in (1.85 m)	So
G	14	Alexis Hornbuckle	5 ft 11 in (1.8 m)	Fr	South Charleston	Charleston, WV
G	21	Loree Moore	5 ft 9 in (1.75 m)	Sr	Narbonne	Carson, California
G/F	25	Brittany Jackson	6 ft 0 in (1.83 m)	Sr	Bradley Central	Cleveland, Tennessee
G	31	Aubrey Guastalli	5 ft 6 in (1.68 m)	Sr
C	33	Sybil Dosty	6 ft 3 in (1.91 m)	Fr
F	43	Shyra Ely	6 ft 2 in (1.88 m)	Sr	Ben Davis	Indianapolis, Indiana
C	50	Tye'sha Fluker	6 ft 5 in (1.96 m)	Jr	John Muir	Pasadena, CA
F/C	55	Nicky Anosike	6 ft 4 in (1.93 m)	Fr	St. Peter's	Brooklyn, NY

Head coach

- Pat Summitt

Assistant coach(es)

- Mickie DeMoss
- Holly Warlick

Legend

- (C) Team captain
- (S) Suspended
- (I) Ineligible
- (W) Walk-on
- Injured
- Current redshirt

Roster

== Schedule and results ==
Date time, TV	Rank^{#}	Opponent^{#}	Result	Record	Site city, state
Regular season
Nov 19, 2004*	No. 1	at Chattanooga	W 68–34	1–0	McKenzie Arena; Chattanooga, Tennessee
Nov 21, 2004*	No. 1	at NC State; Jimmy V Classic	W 64–54	2–0	Reynolds Coliseum; Raleigh, North Carolina
Nov 23, 2004*	No. 1	George Washington	W 71–41	3–0	Thompson–Boling Arena; Knoxville, Tennessee
Nov 25, 2004*	No. 1	at No. 4 Texas	L 59–74	3–1	Frank Erwin Center; Austin, Texas
Nov 28, 2004*	No. 1	Temple	W 52–48	4–1	Thompson–Boling Arena; Knoxville, Tennessee
Dec 2, 2004*	No. 4	No. 10 Duke	L 57–59	4–2	Thompson–Boling Arena; Knoxville, Tennessee
Dec 12, 2004*	No. 9	No. 15 DePaul	W 78–63	5–2	Thompson–Boling Arena; Knoxville, Tennessee
Dec 15, 2004*	No. 9	at Louisiana Tech	W 70–59	6–2	Thomas Assembly Center; Ruston, Louisiana
Dec 19, 2004*	No. 9	TCU	W 82–55	7–2	Thompson–Boling Arena; Knoxville, Tennessee
Dec 21, 2004*	No. 9	No. 2 Stanford	W 70–67	8–2	Thompson–Boling Arena; Knoxville, Tennessee
Dec 29, 2004*	No. 8	at No. 24 Rutgers	L 51–65	8–3	Louis Brown Athletic Center; Piscataway, New Jersey
Jan 2, 2005*	No. 8	at Old Dominion	W 68–58	9–3	Norfolk Scope; Norfolk, Virginia
Jan 8, 2005*	No. 10	at No. 15 Connecticut	W 68–67	10–3	Harry A. Gampel Pavilion; Storrs, Connecticut
Jan 13, 2005	No. 8	Arkansas	W 72–54	11–3 (1–0)	Thompson–Boling Arena; Knoxville, Tennessee
Jan 16, 2005	No. 8	at No. 17 Vanderbilt	W 79–65	12–3 (2–0)	Memorial Gymnasium; Nashville, Tennessee
Jan 20, 2005	No. 7	at Auburn	W 81–71	13–3 (3–0)	Beard–Eaves–Memorial Coliseum; Auburn, Alabama
Jan 23, 2005	No. 7	Kentucky	W 67–49	14–3 (4–0)	Thompson–Boling Arena; Knoxville, Tennessee
Jan 27, 2005	No. 5	at South Carolina	W 68–53	15–3 (5–0)	Colonial Center; Columbia, South Carolina
Jan 31, 2005	No. 5	No. 18 Georgia	W 77–70	16–3 (6–0)	Thompson–Boling Arena; Knoxville, Tennessee
Feb 3, 2005	No. 5	at Florida	W 91–82 ^{OT}	17–3 (7–0)	O'Connell Center; Gainesville, Florida
Feb 6, 2005	No. 5	Ole Miss	W 99–67	18–3 (8–0)	Thompson–Boling Arena; Knoxville, Tennessee
Feb 10, 2005	No. 5	at No. 1 LSU	L 58–68	18–4 (8–1)	Maravich Assembly Center; Baton Rouge, Louisiana
Feb 13, 2005	No. 5	No. 21 Vanderbilt	W 72–63	19–4 (9–1)	Thompson–Boling Arena; Knoxville, Tennessee
Feb 17, 2005	No. 6	South Carolina	W 74–44	20–4 (10–1)	Thompson–Boling Arena; Knoxville, Tennessee
Feb 20, 2005	No. 6	at Arkansas	W 84–71	21–4 (11–1)	Bud Walton Arena; Fayetteville, Arkansas
Feb 24, 2005	No. 5	Mississippi State	W 78–56	22–4 (12–1)	Thompson–Boling Arena; Knoxville, Tennessee
Feb 27, 2005	No. 5	at Alabama	W 94–81	23–4 (13–1)	Coleman Coliseum; Tuscaloosa, Alabama
SEC tournament
Mar 4, 2005*	(1) No. 3	vs. (8) Auburn; Quarterfinals	W 64–54	24–4	BI-LO Center; Greenville, South Carolina
Mar 5, 2003*	(1) No. 3	vs. (4) No. 18 Vanderbilt; Semifinals	W 76–73	25–4	BI-LO Center; Greenville, South Carolina
Mar 6, 2005*	(1) No. 3	vs. (2) No. 2 LSU; Championship game	W 67–65	26–4	BI-LO Center; Greenville, South Carolina
NCAA tournament
Mar 20, 2005*	(1 PHI) No. 3	(16 PHI) Western Carolina; First round	W 94–43	27–4	Thompson–Boling Arena; Knoxville, Tennessee
Mar 22, 2005*	(1 PHI) No. 3	(9 PHI) Purdue; Second round	W 75–54	28–4	Thompson–Boling Arena; Knoxville, Tennessee
Mar 27, 2005*	(1 PHI) No. 3	vs. (4 PHI) No. 14 Texas Tech; Regional Semifinal – Sweet Sixteen	W 75–59	29–4	Liacouras Center; Philadelphia, Pennsylvania
Mar 29, 2005*	(1 PHI) No. 3	vs. (2 PHI) No. 9 Rutgers; Regional Final – Elite Eight	W 59–49	30–4	Liacouras Center; Philadelphia, Pennsylvania
Apr 3, 2005*; ESPN	(1 PHI) No. 3	vs. (1 KC) No. 6 Michigan State; National Semifinal – Final Four	L 64–68	30–5	RCA Dome; Indianapolis, Indiana
*Non-conference game. ^{#}Rankings from AP Poll. (#) Tournament seedings in parentheses. PHI=Philadelphia.

== Rankings ==
Ranking movements Legend: ██ Increase in ranking ██ Decrease in ranking
	Week																			
Poll	Pre	1	2	3	4	5	6	7	8	9	10	11	12	13	14	15	16	17	18	Final
AP	Not released	1	1	4	9	9	9	8	10	8	7	5	5	5	6	5	5	3	3	Not released
Coaches	1	1	1	5	9	10	10	8	10	10	9	6	5	5	6	5	4	3	3	4
