= Austin Nichols (basketball) =

American basketball player (born 1994)

Personal information
- Born: September 20, 1994 (age 32) Memphis, Tennessee
- Listed height: 6 ft 9 in (2.06 m)
- Listed weight: 232 lb (105 kg)

Career information
- High school: Briarcrest Christian School (Eads, Tennessee)
- College: Memphis (2013–2015); Virginia (2016)
- NBA draft: 2017: undrafted
- Playing career: 2017–2018
- Position: Power forward

Career history
- 2017–2018: Memphis Hustle

Career highlights
- First-team All-AAC (2015); AAC Rookie of the Year (2014); First-team Parade All-American (2013); 2× Division II AA Tennessee Mr. Basketball (2012, 2013)

Robert Austin Nichols (born September 20, 1994) is an American former professional basketball player. He played college basketball for the University of Memphis and the University of Virginia.

== Early years ==
Nichols attended Briarcrest Christian School in Eads, Tennessee. While there, he was a four-time letterwinner and helped lead his team to the state championship game. Nichols averaged 22.7 points, 12.2 rebounds and 2.6 blocked shots his senior season en route to being named the Gatorade Player of the Year for Tennessee. On November 5, 2012, Nichols committed to the University of Memphis. He had also received offers from Duke, Virginia, Vanderbilt, and Tennessee.

College recruiting
Name	Hometown	School	Height	Weight	Commit date
Austin Nichols; PF	Eads, Tennessee	Briarcrest High School	6 ft 8 in (2.03 m)	205 lb (93 kg)	Nov 5, 2012
Austin Nichols; PF	Recruit ratings: Scout: Rivals: 247Sports: ESPN:				
Overall recruit ranking: Scout: 36 Rivals: 17 247Sports: 22 ESPN: 15
Note: In many cases, Scout, Rivals, 247Sports, On3, and ESPN may conflict in their listings of height and weight.; In these cases, the average was taken. ESPN grades are on a 100-point scale.; Sources: "Memphis 2013 Basketball Commitments". Rivals.; "2013 Memphis Commits". Scout.; "ESPN". ESPN.; "Scout.com Team Recruiting Rankings". Scout.; "2013 Team Ranking". Rivals.

== College career ==
=== Memphis ===
Nichols started in all 34 of the Tigers' games his freshman year. It was the first time a Memphis freshman had done so since Darius Washington, Jr. during the 2004–05 season. Nichols was named AAC Rookie of the Year at the end of the season.

During his sophomore year, Nichols would be limited to just 27 games because of several ankle injuries. Despite the injuries, he led the Tigers in scoring (13.3 PPG), was second on the team in rebounds (6.1 RPG), and third in the country in blocked shots (3.4 BPG). At the conclusion of the season, it was announced that Nichols had earned a spot on the All-AAC First Team, becoming the first Tigers player to do so since the reorganization of the American.

The summer following his sophomore season, Nichols requested to be released from his scholarship. The Memphis staff initially refused to let Nichols leave, but eventually granted him a conditional release. The conditions would apply if Nichols transfers to the University of Tennessee, any school in the American Athletic Conference, and any out-of-conference schools that play Memphis during the 2015–16 and 2016–17 seasons. Transferring to one of these schools meant that he would have to pay for his redshirt season before becoming scholarship eligible again once reinstated. The Nichols family hired a lawyer to petition for an unconditional release, and on July 14, 2015, Memphis removed all conditions from Nichols' release.

=== Virginia ===
On July 28, 2015, Nichols announced that he was transferring to the University of Virginia. He had also received interest from Notre Dame and Marquette. After sitting out the 2015–16 season as a redshirt, Nichols was scheduled to have two years of eligibility remaining once reinstated.

After being suspended for the opener, Nichols appeared in one game. He was then dismissed from the team on November 18, 2016.

== College statistics ==
Year	Team	GP	GS	MPG	FG%	3P%	FT%	RPG	APG	SPG	BPG	PPG
2013–14	Memphis	34	34	22.8	.589	.000	.536	4.3	0.5	0.4	1.2	9.3
2014–15	Memphis	27	26	29.5	.497	.222	.607	6.1	1.0	0.8	3.4	13.3
2016–17	Virginia	1	0	16.0	.571	.000	1.000	3.0	0.0	0.0	0.0	11.0

== Personal life ==
Austin's parents are Mark and Kim Nichols. He has a twin sister named Ashley and an older sister Natalie.
