= Leslie McDonald =

American basketball player (born 1991)

Free agent
- Position: Shooting guard

Personal information
- Born: February 4, 1991 (age 35) Memphis, Tennessee
- Listed height: 6 ft 5 in (1.96 m)
- Listed weight: 215 lb (98 kg)

Career information
- High school: Briarcrest Christian (Eads, Tennessee)
- College: North Carolina (2009–2014)
- NBA draft: 2014: undrafted
- Playing career: 2014–present

Career history
- 2014: Hapoel Kfar Saba
- 2015: Erie BayHawks

Career highlights
- 2× Tennessee Division 2 AA Mr. Basketball (2008, 2009); Third-team Parade All-American (2008); Fourth-team Parade All-American (2009)
Medals
Men's basketball
Representing United States
FIBA Americas U-18 Championship
Silver medal – second place	2008 Argentina	Team

Leslie Vernard McDonald Jr. (born February 4, 1991) is an American professional basketball player who last played for the Erie BayHawks of the NBA Development League. He played collegiately for the North Carolina Tar Heels.

== High school career ==
Born in Memphis, Tennessee to Leslie Sr. and Wanda, McDonald attended Briarcrest Christian School in Eads, Tennessee where he played for coach John Harrington, and is a two-time Tennessee Division 2 AA Mr. Basketball and the all-time leading scorer in Memphis private school history with 2,353 points. As a junior in 2007–08, he averaged 21.5 points per game and led Briarcrest to the state title. As a senior in 2008–09, he averaged 20.7 points, 6.5 rebounds and 2.3 assists per game.

McDonald committed to the University of North Carolina at Chapel Hill on June 9, 2008, after also receiving scholarship offers from Duke, Georgetown, Georgia Tech, Louisville, Memphis, Ohio State, Tennessee, Wake Forest.

== College career ==
In his four-year career at North Carolina (he redshirted his junior year due to a knee injury), McDonald played 125 games (19 starts) while averaging 6.7 points and 1.9 rebounds in 17.0 minutes per game.

== Professional career ==
McDonald went undrafted in the 2014 NBA draft. On August 20, 2014, he signed with Hapoel Kfar Saba of Israel for the 2014–15 season. However, he left Hapoel in November 2014 after appearing in just five games. On January 9, 2015, he was acquired by the Erie BayHawks of the NBA Development League. On March 3, 2015, he was waived by the BayHawks after appearing in 12 games. On April 4, he was acquired by the Oklahoma City Blue, but didn't play for them.
