= Trey Smith (offensive lineman) =

American football player (born 1999)

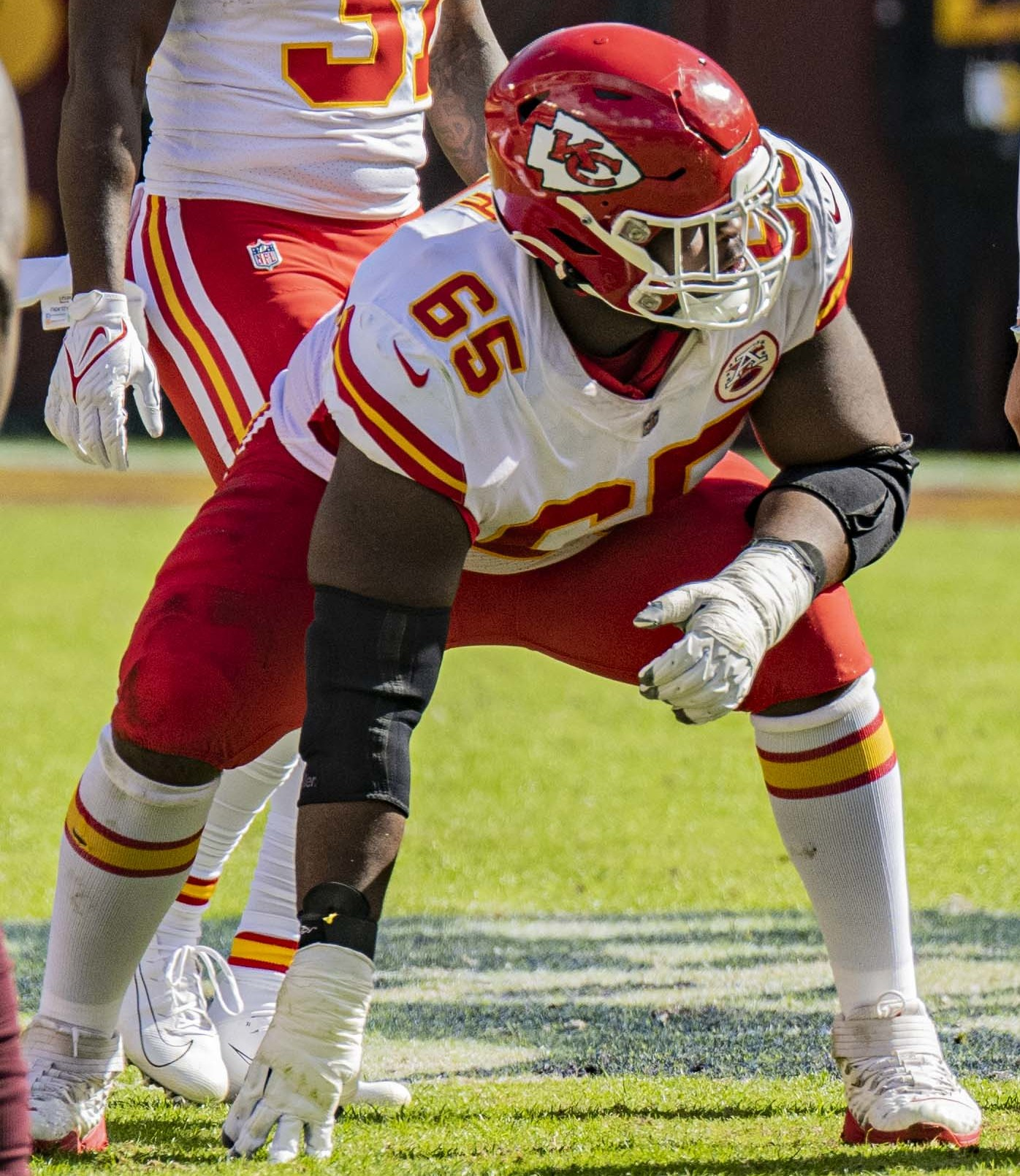
- Smith with the Kansas City Chiefs in 2021

No. 65 – Kansas City Chiefs
- Position: Guard
- Roster status: Active

Personal information
- Born: June 16, 1999 (age 27); Humboldt, Tennessee, U.S.
- Listed height: 6 ft 6 in (1.98 m)
- Listed weight: 321 lb (146 kg)

Career information
- High school: University (Jackson, Tennessee)
- College: Tennessee (2017–2020)
- NFL draft: 2021: 6th round, 226th overall pick

Career history
- Kansas City Chiefs (2021–present)

Awards and highlights
- 2× Super Bowl champion (LVII, LVIII); 2× Pro Bowl (2024, 2025); PFWA All-Rookie Team (2021); 2× First-team All-SEC (2019, 2020); Second-team All-SEC (2017)

Career NFL statistics as of 2025
- Games played: 79
- Games started: 79
- Stats at Pro Football Reference

Henry Louis "Trey" Smith III (born June 16, 1999) is an American professional football guard for the Kansas City Chiefs of the National Football League (NFL). He played college football for the Tennessee Volunteers before he was selected by the Chiefs in the sixth round of the 2021 NFL draft.

== Early life ==
A native of Humboldt, Tennessee, Smith attended the University School of Jackson, where he was a three-time All-State offensive lineman.

Regarded as a five-star recruit, Smith was ranked as the No. 1 prospect overall in the class of 2017 by ESPN. He chose Tennessee over scholarship offers from Ohio State, Ole Miss, and Alabama.

== College career ==
In his true freshman year at Tennessee, Smith started all twelve games; first at right guard, later at left tackle. For his efforts in the 2017 season, he was named to the All-Southeastern Conference (SEC) Second Team.

After starting the first seven games of this sophomore season at left tackle, Tennessee's medical staff discovered blood clots in Smith's lungs and ruled him out indefinitely. The issue had originally been discovered in February 2018, before the Volunteers' spring practice but thought to have been resolved. Smith missed the remainder of the 2018 season.

Cleared to return for his junior season, Smith was moved to left guard as true freshman Wanya Morris took over as left tackle. He was named to the All-SEC First Team. Despite some speculation that he would enter the 2020 NFL draft, Smith announced that he would remain in Tennessee for his senior year. He started all ten games and earned first-team All-SEC honors for the Volunteers in his last season.

== Professional career ==
Pre-draft measurables
Height	Weight	Arm length	Hand span	Wingspan	40-yard dash	10-yard split	20-yard split	20-yard shuttle	Three-cone drill	Vertical jump	Broad jump	Bench press
6 ft 5 1/2 in (1.97 m)	321 lb (146 kg)	33 5/8 in (0.85 m)	9 3/4 in (0.25 m)	6 ft 10 1/8 in (2.09 m)	5.11 s	1.75 s	3.01 s	4.82 s	7.43 s	31.0 in (0.79 m)	9 ft 4 in (2.84 m)	32 reps
All values from Pro Day

Smith was drafted by the Kansas City Chiefs in the sixth round, 226th overall, of the 2021 NFL draft. He signed his four-year rookie contract on May 13, 2021. He was named the Chiefs starting right guard immediately as a rookie. He started all 17 regular season games and three playoff games for the Chiefs as a rookie. He was named to the NFL All-Rookie Team for the 2021 season. In 2022, Smith started 16 regular season games and the Chiefs' three playoff games. Smith started at right guard in Super Bowl LVII and solidified an offensive line that gave up zero sacks in the game as the Chiefs defeated the Philadelphia Eagles 38–35. In the 2023 regular season, Smith started in all 17 games. Smith won his second straight championship when the Chiefs defeated the San Francisco 49ers 25–22 in Super Bowl LVIII. In 2024, he started in all 17 regular season games and the Chiefs' three postseason games. He helped the Chiefs reach Super Bowl LIX where they lost 40–22 to the Eagles.

In February 2025, the Chiefs placed the non-exclusive franchise tag on Smith. On July 15, Smith signed a four-year, $94 million contract extension with $70 million guaranteed, making him the highest-paid guard in the NFL. He appeared and started in 12 games in the 2025 season for the Chiefs.

== Personal life ==
Smith is a Christian. He made a guest cameo as himself on 2024 Hallmark Channel original film, Holiday Touchdown: A Chiefs Love Story. Trey's oldest sister, Ashley, also is in the NFL, but runs the league's player engagement program which supports NFL players' personal and professional growth.
