= Luke Murphy (baseball) =

American baseball player (born 1999)

Los Angeles Angels – No. 72
- Pitcher
- Born: November 5, 1999 (age 26); Nashville, Tennessee, U.S.
- Bats: Right Throws: Right

MLB debut
- July 31, 2026, for the Los Angeles Angels

MLB statistics (through September 23, 2026)
- Win–loss record: 0–3
- Earned run average: 5.79
- Strikeouts: 19
- Stats at Baseball Reference

Teams
- Los Angeles Angels (2026–present)

Luke Evan Murphy (born November 5, 1999) is an American professional baseball pitcher for the Los Angeles Angels of Major League Baseball (MLB). He made his MLB debut in 2026.

== Amateur career ==
Murphy attended East Robertson High School in Cross Plains, Tennessee. In 2018, he won District 9A MVP and Robertson County Player of the Year. He was ranked No. 4 right-handed pitcher and No.8 overall player in Tennessee by Perfect Game. He played college baseball at Vanderbilt University. In 2021 season as a senior, he made 27 appearances and recorded 4-1 with a 2.40 ERA, nine saves and 61 strikeouts in 41 1/3 innings pitched.

== Professional career ==
The Los Angeles Angels selected Murphy in the fourth round of the 2021 Major League Baseball draft. He made his professional debut that year with the High-A Tri-City Dust Devils.

Murphy spent 2022 with the Double-A Rocket City Trash Pandas, recording 7-2 with a 2.62 ERA, 52 strikeouts and a save in 44 2/3 innings pitched. He returned to Rocket City in 2023, and played in Arizona Fall League after the season. Murphy split 2024 between Tri-City and Rocket City. He split 2025 between Rocket City and Triple-A Salt Lake Bees. He started 2026 with the Double-A. In 2026, Murphy made 34 appearances for the Double-A Trash Pandas, pitching 38 innings while recording a 0.71 ERA and 32% strikeout rate.

On July 30, 2026, Murphy was selected to the 40-man roster and promoted to the major leagues for the first time. He made his MLB debut the next day against the Milwaukee Brewers.
