= Jabari Small =

American football player (born 2002)

No. 26 – Detroit Lions
- Position: Running back
- Roster status: Practice squad

Personal information
- Born: January 31, 2002 (age 24); Memphis, Tennessee, U.S.
- Listed height: 5 ft 9 in (1.75 m)
- Listed weight: 198 lb (90 kg)

Career information
- High school: Briarcrest Christian School (Eads, Tennessee)
- College: Tennessee (2020–2023)
- NFL draft: 2024: undrafted

Career history
- Tennessee Titans (2024)*; Detroit Lions (2025–present)
- * Offseason or practice squad member only

Career NFL statistics as of Week 9, 2026
- Return yards: 52
- Stats at Pro Football Reference

Jabari Mikal Small (born January 31, 2002) is an American professional football running back for the Detroit Lions of the National Football League (NFL). He played college football for the Tennessee Volunteers and was signed by the Tennessee Titans as an undrafted free agent.

== Early life ==
Small attended high school at Briarcrest. In Small's sophomore season, he hauled in 22 receptions for 266 yards and three touchdowns. In Small's junior season, he rushed for 1,118 yards and 12 touchdowns. During the quarterfinals in the playoffs in Small's senior season, he scored four touchdowns but Briarcrest lost to Ensworth High School. Coming out of high school, Small was rated as a three star recruit the 12th best all purpose back and the 22nd best recruit in the state of Tennessee. Small initially decided to commit to play college football for the Ole Miss Rebels. However, just a few months later in December, Small decided to de-commit from the Rebels. Ultimately, Small decided to flip his commitment to play for the Tennessee Volunteers.

== College career ==
In Small's freshman season in 2020, he carried the ball 26 times for 117 yards while also bringing in four receptions for 24 yards. During the 2021 season, Small rushed for 792 yards and nine touchdowns on 141 carries. In week three of the 2022 season, Small suffered an arm injury after rushing twice for 14 yards. During the 2022 season, Small ran for 734 yards and 13 touchdowns on 157 carries, while also notching 12 receptions for 106 yards and two touchdowns. Small finished the 2023 season rushing 95 times for 475 yards and two touchdowns, while also bringing in seven receptions for 40 yards. After the conclusion of the 2023 season, Small decided to declare for the 2024 NFL draft. Small also decided to opt of the Volunteers Bowl Game versus Iowa.

== Professional career ==
Pre-draft measurables
Height	Weight	Arm length	Hand span	Wingspan	40-yard dash	10-yard split	20-yard split	20-yard shuttle	Vertical jump	Broad jump	Bench press
5 ft 8 3/4 in (1.75 m)	198 lb (90 kg)	29 7/8 in (0.76 m)	8 3/4 in (0.22 m)	6 ft 0 3/4 in (1.85 m)	4.62 s	1.55 s	2.57 s	4.34 s	36 in (0.91 m)	9 ft 9 in (2.97 m)	10 reps
All values from Pro Day

=== Tennessee Titans ===
Small signed with the Tennessee Titans as an undrafted free agent on May 10, 2024. He was waived on August 27, and re-signed to the practice squad.

Small signed a reserve/future contract with Tennessee on January 6, 2025. On May 14, Small was waived by the Titans.

=== Detroit Lions ===
On July 18, 2025, Small signed with the Detroit Lions. He was waived by the Lions on August 10. On December 1, Small was re-signed to the practice squad. He signed a reserve/future contract with Detroit on January 5, 2026.

On September 3, 2026, Small was waived by the Lions; he was re-signed to the team's practice squad four days later.

== Personal life ==
Small's father Eddie was a wide receiver for the Ole Miss Rebels, while his two uncles Tony and O.J. were both all SEC wide receivers for Georgia Bulldogs and the Florida Gators.
