= O. J. Small =

American football player (born 1982)

No. 18
- Position: Wide receiver

Personal information
- Born: August 18, 1982 (age 44); Jacksonville, Florida, U.S.
- Listed height: 6 ft 1 in (1.85 m)
- Listed weight: 223 lb (101 kg)

Career information
- College: Florida
- NFL draft: 2005: undrafted

Career history
- Tennessee Titans (2005)

Awards and highlights
- Second-team All-SEC (2004)
- Stats at Pro Football Reference

Ozell Jermaine Small (born August 18, 1982) is an American former football wide receiver in the National Football League (NFL), who played for the Tennessee Titans. He played college football for the Florida Gators.

== Personal life ==
Small's nephew, Jabari Small, signed with the Tennessee Titans as an undrafted free agent in 2024.
