= 2004–05 LSU Lady Tigers basketball team =

Intercollegiate basketball season

2004–05 LSU Lady Tigers basketball

SEC Regular season champions Women's Sports Foundation Classic champions Coors Classic champions

NCAA Women's Tournament, Final Four
- Conference: Southeastern Conference

Ranking
- Coaches: No. 3
- AP: No. 2
- Record: 33–3 (14–0 SEC)
- Head coach: Pokey Chatman (1st season)
- Assistant coaches: Bob Starkey; Carla Berry; Christie Sides
- Home arena: Pete Maravich Assembly Center

2004–05 SEC women's basketball standings
	Conf.				Overall
Team	W		L	PCT	W		L	PCT
No. 2 LSU	14	–	0	1.000	33	–	3	.917
No. 3 Tennessee^{†}	13	–	1	.929	30	–	5	.857
No. 18 Vanderbilt	10	–	4	.714	24	–	8	.750
No. 20 Georgia	9	–	5	.643	24	–	10	.706
Ole Miss	8	–	6	.571	19	–	11	.633
Mississippi State	6	–	8	.429	17	–	12	.586
Auburn	6	–	8	.429	16	–	13	.552
Florida	5	–	9	.357	14	–	15	.483
Alabama	4	–	10	.286	14	–	15	.483
Kentucky	4	–	10	.286	18	–	16	.529
Arkansas	3	–	11	.214	17	–	14	.548
South Carolina	2	–	12	.143	8	–	21	.276
† 2005 SEC tournament winner Rankings from AP poll

The 2004–05 LSU Lady Tigers basketball team represented Louisiana State University during the 2004–05 women's college basketball season. The Lady Tigers, were led by first-year head coach Pokey Chatman, played their home games at Pete Maravich Assembly Center, and were members of the Southeastern Conference. They finished the season 33–3, 14–0 in SEC play to finish atop the conference regular season standings. As the one seed in the SEC women's tournament, they lost in the championship game to Tennessee. They received an at-large bid to the NCAA women's tournament as the No. 1 seed in the Chattanooga region. The Lady Tigers defeated Stetson, Arizona, Liberty, and Duke to reach the Final Four in back-to-back seasons. LSU was beaten in the National semifinals by Baylor.

== Roster ==
2004–05 LSU Tigers women's basketball team
Players
Coaches

Pos.	#	Name	Height	Year	Previous school	Hometown
G	2	Temeka Johnson	5 ft 3 in (1.6 m)	Sr	Bonnabel	New Orleans, LA
G	5	Erica White	5 ft 4 in (1.63 m)	Fr	Ribault	Jacksonville, FL
G	10	Khaliah Mitchell	5 ft 11 in (1.8 m)	Fr	St. Mary's	New Orleans, LA
G	12	RaShonta LeBlanc	5 ft 7 in (1.7 m)	Fr	Memorial	Port Arthur, TX
G	15	Quianna Chaney	5 ft 11 in (1.8 m)	Fr	Southern Lab	Baton Rouge, LA
F	22	Florence Williams	6 ft 1 in (1.85 m)	Sr	Miami Edison	Miami, FL
G	24	Marian Whitfield	5 ft 9 in (1.75 m)	Fr	Glenn Hills	Augusta, GA
C	31	Sylvia Fowles	6 ft 5 in (1.96 m)	Fr	Miami Edison	Miami, FL
G	32	Scholanda Dorrell	5 ft 10 in (1.78 m)	Jr	Miami Edison	Miami, FL
G	33	Seimone Augustus	6 ft 1 in (1.85 m)	Jr	Capitol	Baton Rouge, LA
F	34	Wendlyn Jones	6 ft 1 in (1.85 m)	Jr	Blytheville	Blytheville, AR
F	42	Hanna Biernacka	6 ft 1 in (1.85 m)	So	Telge Emergi Club	Stockholm, Sweden
F	52	Tillie Willis	6 ft 3 in (1.91 m)	Sr	Cumberland Christian	Mableton, GA
F	54	Ashley Thomas	6 ft 0 in (1.83 m)	Fr	Stephenson	Stone Mountain, GA
C	55	Crystal White	6 ft 5 in (1.96 m)	Sr	Mount Clemens; Duke	Mount Clemens, MI

Head coach

- Pokey Chatman (LSU)

Assistant coach(es)

- Bob Starkey (West Virginia State)
- Carla Berry (LSU)
- Christie Sides (Louisiana Tech)

Legend

- (C) Team captain
- (S) Suspended
- (I) Ineligible
- (W) Walk-on
- Injured
- Current redshirt

Roster

== Schedule and results ==
Date time, TV	Rank^{#}	Opponent^{#}	Result	Record	Site (attendance) city, state
Non–Conference Regular Season
November 11, 2004*	No. 3	Maine; Women's Sports Foundation Classic – Opening Round	W 81–50	1–0	Maravich Assembly Center; Baton Rouge, Louisiana
November 12, 2004*	No. 3	Arizona State; Women's Sports Foundation Classic – Championship Game	W 65–54	2–0	Maravich Assembly Center; Baton Rouge, Louisiana
November 14, 2004*	No. 3	vs. No. 8 Baylor; State Farm Tip-Off Classic	W 71–70	3–0	Frank Erwin Center; Austin, Texas
November 21, 2004*	No. 3	vs. Southern Miss	W 80–35	4–0	Houma Civic Center; Houma, Louisiana
November 23, 2004*	No. 2	at Temple	W 65–51	5–0	Liacouras Center; Philadelphia, Pennsylvania
November 26, 2004*	No. 2	vs. Maryland; Coors Classic – Opening Round	W 64–51	6–0	Coors Events Center; Boulder, Colorado
November 27, 2004*	No. 2	at Colorado; Coors Classic – Championship Game	W 75–44	7–0	Coors Events Center; Boulder, Colorado
November 30, 2004*	No. 1	North Texas	W 77–51	8–0	Maravich Assembly Center; Baton Rouge, Louisiana
December 14, 2004*	No. 1	at No. 18 Minnesota	W 75–67	9–0	Maturi Pavilion; Minneapolis, Minnesota
December 18, 2004*	No. 1	at Southwest Missouri State; Triple Crown Classic	W 66–54	10–0	Hammons Student Center; Springfield, Missouri
December 21, 2004*	No. 1	at UC Santa Barbara	W 72–52	11–0	The Thunderdome; Santa Barbara, California
December 30, 2004*	No. 1	Texas State	W 78–38	12–0	Maravich Assembly Center; Baton Rouge, Louisiana
January 2, 2005*	No. 1	Tulane	W 79–45	13–0	Maravich Assembly Center; Baton Rouge, Louisiana
January 5, 2005*	No. 1	at Rutgers	L 49–51 ^{OT}	13–1	Louis Brown Athletic Center; New Brunswick, New Jersey
SEC Regular Season
January 8, 2005	No. 1	No. 16 Georgia	W 76–52	14–1 (1–0)	Maravich Assembly Center; Baton Rouge, Louisiana
January 13, 2005	No. 3	at Florida	W 64–47	15–1 (2–0)	O'Connell Center; Gainesville, Florida
January 16, 2005	No. 3	Alabama	W 76–51	16–1 (3–0)	Maravich Assembly Center; Baton Rouge, Louisiana
January 20, 2005	No. 2	Arkansas	W 91–45	17–1 (4–0)	Maravich Assembly Center; Baton Rouge, Louisiana
January 23, 2005	No. 2	at No. 17 Vanderbilt	W 79–68	18–1 (5–0)	Memorial Gymnasium; Nashville, Tennessee
January 30, 2005	No. 2	Auburn	W 57–52	19–1 (6–0)	Maravich Assembly Center; Baton Rouge, Louisiana
February 3, 2005	No. 1	at Ole Miss	W 82–58	20–1 (7–0)	Tad Smith Coliseum; Oxford, Mississippi
February 6, 2005	No. 1	at Mississippi State	W 67–40	21–1 (8–0)	Humphrey Coliseum; Starkville, Mississippi
February 10, 2005	No. 1	No. 5 Tennessee	W 68–58	22–1 (9–0)	Maravich Assembly Center; Baton Rouge, Louisiana
February 13, 2005	No. 1	at South Carolina	W 66–36	23–1 (10–0)	Colonial Center; Columbia, South Carolina
February 17, 2005	No. 1	Kentucky	W 81–58	24–1 (11–0)	Maravich Assembly Center; Baton Rouge, Louisiana
February, 20, 2005	No. 1	at Auburn	W 62–57	25–1 (12–0)	Beard–Eaves–Memorial Coliseum; Auburn, Alabama
February 24, 2005	No. 1	at Arkansas	W 92–64	26–1 (13–0)	Bud Walton Arena; Fayetteville, Arkansas
February 27, 2005	No. 1	Florida	W 76–52	27–1 (14–0)	Maravich Assembly Center; Baton Rouge, Louisiana
SEC Tournament
March 4, 2005*	(1) No. 1	vs. (8) Alabama; Quarterfinals	W 60–59	28–1	BI-LO Center; Greenville, South Carolina
March 5, 2005*	(1) No. 1	vs. (4) No. 21 Georgia; Semifinals	W 79–65	29–1	BI-LO Center; Greenville, South Carolina
March 6, 2005*; 3:00 pm, ESPN2	(1) No. 1	vs. (2) No. 5 Tennessee; Championship Game	L 65–67	29–2	BI-LO Center; Greenville, South Carolina
NCAA Tournament
March 20, 2005*; 1:30 pm, ESPN	(1 S) No. 2	vs. (16 S) Stetson; First Round	W 70–36	30–2	Thompson–Boling Arena; Knoxville, Tennessee
March 22, 2005*; 6:00 pm, ESPN2	(1 S) No. 2	vs. (9 S) Arizona; Second Round	W 76–43	31–2	Thompson–Boling Arena; Knoxville, Tennessee
March 26, 2005*; 12:00 pm, ESPN	(1 S) No. 2	vs. (13 S) Liberty; Sweet Sixteen	W 90–48	32–2	McKenzie Arena; Chattanooga, Tennessee
March 28, 2005*; 8:00 pm, ESPN	(1 S) No. 2	vs. (2 S) No. 8 Duke; Elite Eight	W 59–49	33–2	McKenzie Arena; Chattanooga, Tennessee
April 3, 2005*; 6:00 pm, ESPN	(1 S) No. 2	vs. (2 W) No. 5 Baylor; Final Four	L 57–68	33–3	RCA Dome; Indianapolis, Indiana
*Non-conference game. ^{#}Rankings from AP Poll. (#) Tournament seedings in parentheses. All times are in Central Time. S = South, W = West.

== Rankings ==
2004–05 NCAA Division I women's basketball rankings
