= Ashley Earley =

American basketball player (born 1983)

Personal information
- Born: March 9, 1983 (age 43) Memphis, Tennessee, U.S.
- Listed height: 5 ft 11 in (1.80 m)

Career information
- High school: Briarcrest (Memphis, Tennessee)
- College: Vanderbilt (2002–2005)
- WNBA draft: 2005: 3rd round, 29th overall pick
- Drafted by: Indiana Fever
- Position: Guard / Forward

Career history
- 2005: Indiana Fever

Career highlights
- First-team All-SEC (2005)
- Stats at Basketball Reference

Ashley Earley (born March 9, 1983) is an American basketball player.

Ashley Earley was born to parents Lee and Linda Earley and raised in Memphis, Tennessee. She attended Briarcrest HS in Memphis. Earley was named a WBCA All-American (high school). She participated in the 2001 WBCA High School All-America Game, where she scored nine points.

The Earley Trophy Case

- 2001 Tennessee Gatorade Player of the Year
- 2001 Division II A Tennessee Miss Basketball
- 1998 & 2001 State Tournament MVP
- 2001 Best of the Preps Player of the Year (Memphis)
- 2001 Parade First Team All-American
- 2001 USA Today Second Team All-American
- 2001 Naismith Finalist
- 2000 NIKE All-American
- 1998 & 1999 WBCA/Reebok Underclass All-American

She attended Vanderbilt University in Nashville, Tennessee from 2001 to 2005 and graduated with a psychology degree.

In the 2005 WNBA draft, she was drafted as the third round selection of the Indiana Fever. After being waived, she played the 2005–06 season overseas with Maccabi Tel Kabir in Tel Aviv, Israel.

In May, 2005, Earley joined the athletic department staff at The University of Alabama as the graduate assistant coach. Her former Vanderbilt University Commodore teammate, Ashley McElhiney also joined as the director of women's basketball operations.

In May 2009, Early left Tennessee Tech to join the University of Rhode Island as an assistant coach. In June 2010, she became assistant coach at Marquette University.

== Vanderbilt statistics ==
Legend
GP	Games played	GS	Games started	MPG	Minutes per game
FG%	Field goal percentage	3P%	3-point field goal percentage	FT%	Free throw percentage
RPG	Rebounds per game	APG	Assists per game	SPG	Steals per game
BPG	Blocks per game	PPG	Points per game	**Bold**	Career high

Year	Team	GP	Points	FG%	3P%	FT%	RPG	APG	SPG	BPG	PPG
2001–02	Vanderbilt	**37**	205	47.8	**21.4**	67.5	4.7	1.6	0.7	0.1	5.5
2002–03	Vanderbilt	32	202	56.6	–	64.0	3.4	0.9	1.0	0.2	6.3
2003–04	Vanderbilt	34	386	55.8	–	63.6	6.7	1.5	1.4	**0.4**	11.4
2004–05	Vanderbilt	32	**589**	**64.0**	–	**68.6**	**9.4**	**2.2**	**2.1**	**0.4**	**18.4**
Career		135	1382	57.8	18.8	66.3	6.0	1.6	1.3	0.3	10.2
