= Lisa Quinn =

American artist, author and television host

Lisa Pickens Quinn is an American artist, author, and television host.

== Biography and career ==
Quinn was born in Memphis, Tennessee, where she attended Briarcrest High School. After graduating from the Art Institute of Fort Lauderdale in 1997, she began an interior consultation business and married Michael Quinn. In 1998, her company Lisa Quinn, Inc. relocated to the San Francisco Bay Area and became a design entertainment firm.

She is a contributor to Better Homes and Gardens, Redbook, Life, New York Daily News, San Francisco Chronicle, Seattle Post Intelligencer, and Parade. Quinn has appeared on Good Morning America, The CBS Early Show, HGTV, and The Oprah Winfrey Show. She designed sets for the National Geographic Society and the Discovery Channel.

== Personal life ==
Lisa and Michael Quinn reside in the San Francisco Bay Area with their two children.

== Awards ==
- 2009 Emmy Award for Outstanding Achievement—Program Host

== Bibliography ==
- Life's Too Short to Fold Fitted Sheets, Chronicle Books (2010)
- $500 Room Makeovers, Random House (2006)
