= East Robertson High School =

Public school in Cross Plains, Tennessee

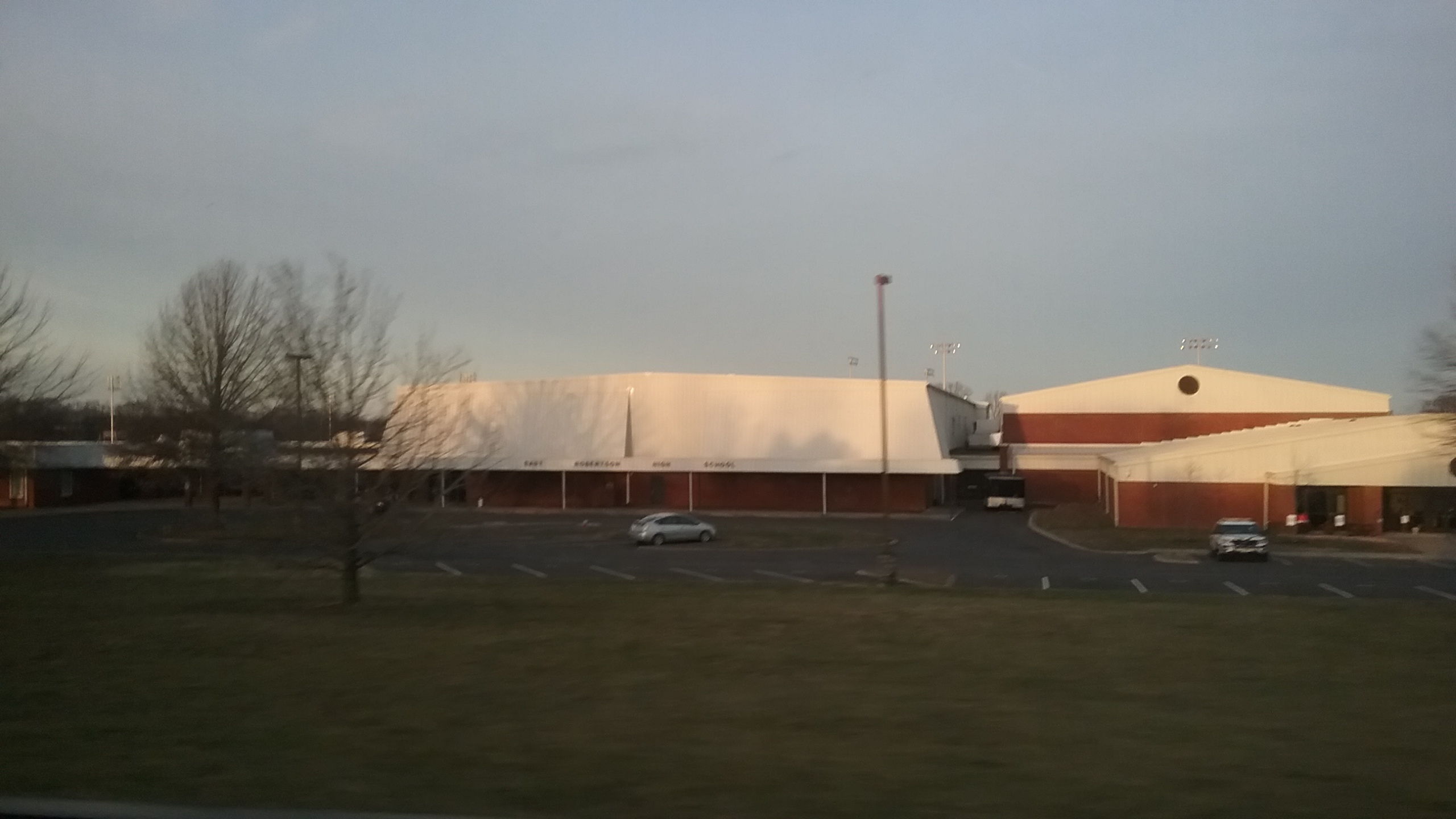
- East Robertson High school
- 158 Kilgore Trace; Cross Plains, Tennessee; United States

Information
- Type: Public high school
- Established: 1950
- School district: Robertson County Schools
- Director: Danny Weeks
- Principal: Mary Cook
- Grades: 6–12
- Enrollment: 708 (2023–24)
- Colors: Maroon and white
- Nickname: Indians
- Website: erhs.rcstn.net

East Robertson High School is a public high school in Cross Plains, Tennessee. It is one of five high schools managed by Robertson County Schools.

== History ==
In 1950, two high schools in eastern Robertson County—Orlinda High School, located in Orlinda, and Cross Plains High School, located in Cross Plains—merged to form James Robertson High School, originally located on East Robertson Road. At some point, the school was renamed to what it is today, East Robertson High School. East Robertson High School became a K–12 school after the addition of new classrooms. On May 9, 1970, East Robertson's principal, Edwin H. Osborne, died from a heart attack at the age of 61.

In late 1990, grades 7–12 moved to East Robertson's present-day Kilgore Trace location, and the East Robertson Road location became an elementary school. In 2002, East Robertson High School opened several new middle school classrooms, allowing for sixth grade classes to take place. As of June 2023, East Robertson High School accommodates grades 6–12.

== Athletics ==
East Robertson has football, baseball, basketball, softball, soccer, and volleyball teams. The school plays in Region 4 of Division II A as of 2022.

== Notable alumni ==
- Luke Murphy (2017), baseball player in the Los Angeles Angels organization
