= Sally Anthony =

American pop musician

- Origin: Indianapolis, Indiana (United States)
- Genres: Pop rock
- Years active: 1998–present
- Labels: EMI
- Website: sallyanthony.com

Sally Anthony is an American pop musician.

== Biography ==
Anthony grew up in Indianapolis, Indiana, and self-released her first EP in 1998. Two more EPs followed, and Anthony, who had built a strong fan base in Indiana, was offered the opportunity to tour with acts such as Natalie Merchant, Chris Isaak, Barenaked Ladies, James Taylor, Tom Petty, and Enrique Iglesias. While preparing her debut LP, Vent, she became part-owner of the semi-pro basketball team Nashville Shock in 2004. In January 2005, after attempting to fire the team's coach in the middle of a game, she resigned as CEO and had to release the album independently. Nevertheless, two singles, "Vent" and "C'mon C'mon", hit the Radio & Records charts and the album sold over 175,000 copies. Continuing to build a fan base on the internet with sites such as MySpace, Anthony signed with EMI and released her second album, Goodbye, in October 2007. The album has peaked at #9 on the Billboard Heatseekers chart.

== Discography ==
- One Word Poetry Contest EP (1998)
- Preview EP (2001)
- Come Clean EP (2002)
- Vent (Gracie Productions, 2005)
- Goodbye (Gracie/EMI, October 23, 2007)
