= Jim Mabry =

American football player (born 1966)

No. 56
- Position: Lineman

Personal information
- Born: 1966 (age 59–60)
- Listed height: 6 ft 5 in (1.96 m)
- Listed weight: 290 lb (132 kg)

Career information
- High school: Briarcrest (Memphis, Tennessee)
- College: Arkansas (1985–1989)

Awards and highlights
- Consensus All-American (1989); 2× First-team All-SWC (1988, 1989)

Jim Mabry (born 1966) is an American former football player. He played on both the offensive line and defensive line at Briarcrest Christian School in Memphis, Tennessee, from 1981 to 1985. He then attended and played college football at the University of Arkansas and was an offensive tackle from 1985 to 1989. Following his senior season at Arkansas he was named a consensus All-American and appeared on the nationally televised Bob Hope Christmas special.

Mabry lettered with the Razorbacks from 1986 to 1989, after redshirting in 1985. Mabry earned First Team All-Southwest Conference honors in 1988 and 1989 in addition to his First Team All-America honors in 1989. Mabry anchored an offensive line at left tackle that won back-to-back Southwest Conference championships in 1988 and 1989, and played in back-to-back Cotton Bowl Classic in those years. His blocking helped the Hogs average 453 yards per game in offense in 1989. Mabry is also a member of the 1980s Razorback all-decade team. He never played professional football.

Following his playing career, Mabry's jersey was retired (#56) at Briarcrest High. He also served as the honorary captain for the Arkansas-Auburn football game on October 15, 2005. He now resides in Little Rock, Arkansas.
