= Upperman High School =

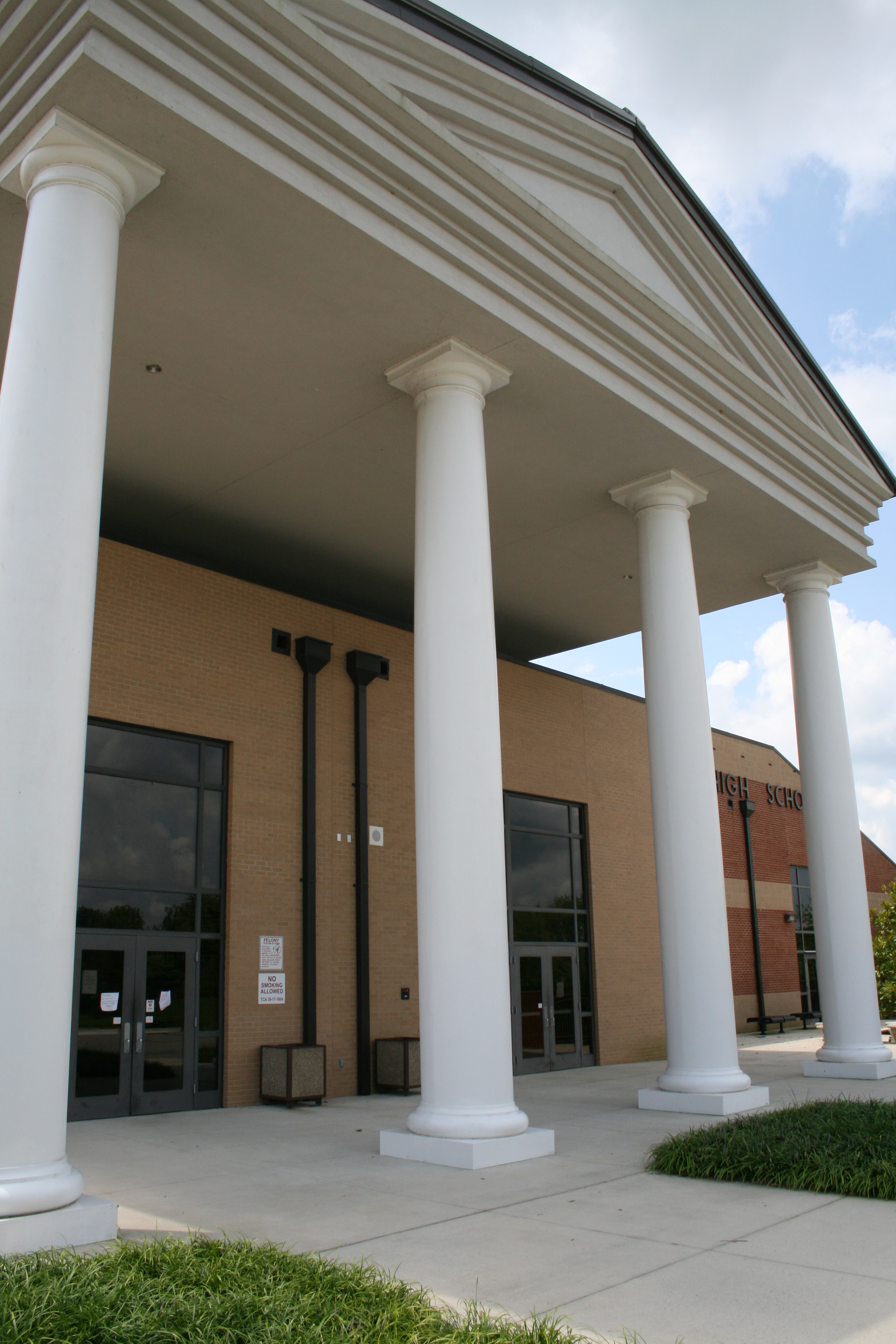

Location
- 6950 Nashville HWY; Baxter, Tennessee 38544; United States
- Coordinates: 36.1686°N 85.636°W

Information
- Type: Public high school
- Motto: "Truth, Honor, Loyalty, Service"
- Established: 1959
- Principal: Stephen Robbins
- Assistant Principals: Ross Fanning, Michelle Bowman
- Staff: 46.22 (FTE)
- Grades: 9–12
- Enrollment: 918 (2023-2024)
- Student to teacher ratio: 19.86
- Color
- Mascot: Bee

Upperman High School is a public high school located in Baxter, Tennessee. It is part of the Putnam County, Tennessee School District. Upperman includes grades 9–12. Upperman was listed as one of the United States' best high schools by U.S. News & World Report in 2008.

== History ==
On August 22, 1959, Upperman High School opened with an enrollment of 363 students from grades 9 through 12 on the campus of the former Baxter Seminary. Dave C. Huddleston was the school's first principal. In 1976, a new school building was built on the same campus and enrollment was expanded to include grades 7 through 12. On January 6, 2003, the location of the school was moved roughly a mile to a new campus where the school is still located today.

== Sports ==
Sports programs at Upperman currently include Boys Basketball, Girls Basketball, Baseball, Softball, Football, Lacrosse, Track & Field, Volleyball, Boys and Girls Golf, Boys and Girls Bowling, Wrestling, Boys Soccer, Girls Soccer, Cross Country, Dance, And Marching Band.

Upperman has won three TSSAA State Championships in 1991, 1993 and 2022.

The Upperman Lady Bees Girls' Basketball team won the 2017 and 2018 TSSAA Class AAA State Championships).
