= University School of Jackson =

Location
- 232 McClellan Road; Jackson, Madison County, Tennessee 38305; United States; 35.706°N 88.889°W

Information
- Type: Independent school
- Established: 1987
- NCES School ID: AA890889
- Head of school: Don Roe
- Faculty: 120 (FTE)
- Enrollment: 1075 (881 Non-Prekindergarten)
- Average class size: 20
- Student to teacher ratio: 10:1
- Campus: Suburban area
- Campus size: 180 acres
- Colors: Red and Columbia blue
- Athletics: Football, Baseball, Basketball, Soccer, Volleyball, Tennis, Golf, Cheer
- Athletics conference: TSSAA
- Mascot: Bruins
- Nickname: USJ
- Accreditation: SAIS
- Average ACT Score: 27
- Website: usjbruins.org

University School of Jackson (USJ) is a non-denominational, non-sectarian, independent, college preparatory school located in northwest Jackson, Tennessee, that educates students from infancy through the 12th grade.

== History ==
USJ was formed from the merger of Old Hickory Academy (OHA) and Episcopal Day School (EDS). Each of these schools were originally formed in 1970. Old Hickory Academy was an independent school which included primary education through a high school curriculum. Episcopal Day School was a smaller, parochial school which emphasized primary education, but had begun a high school program by 1986, enrolling grades nine and ten.

In 1987 the two schools merged to form the University School of Jackson.

== Academics ==
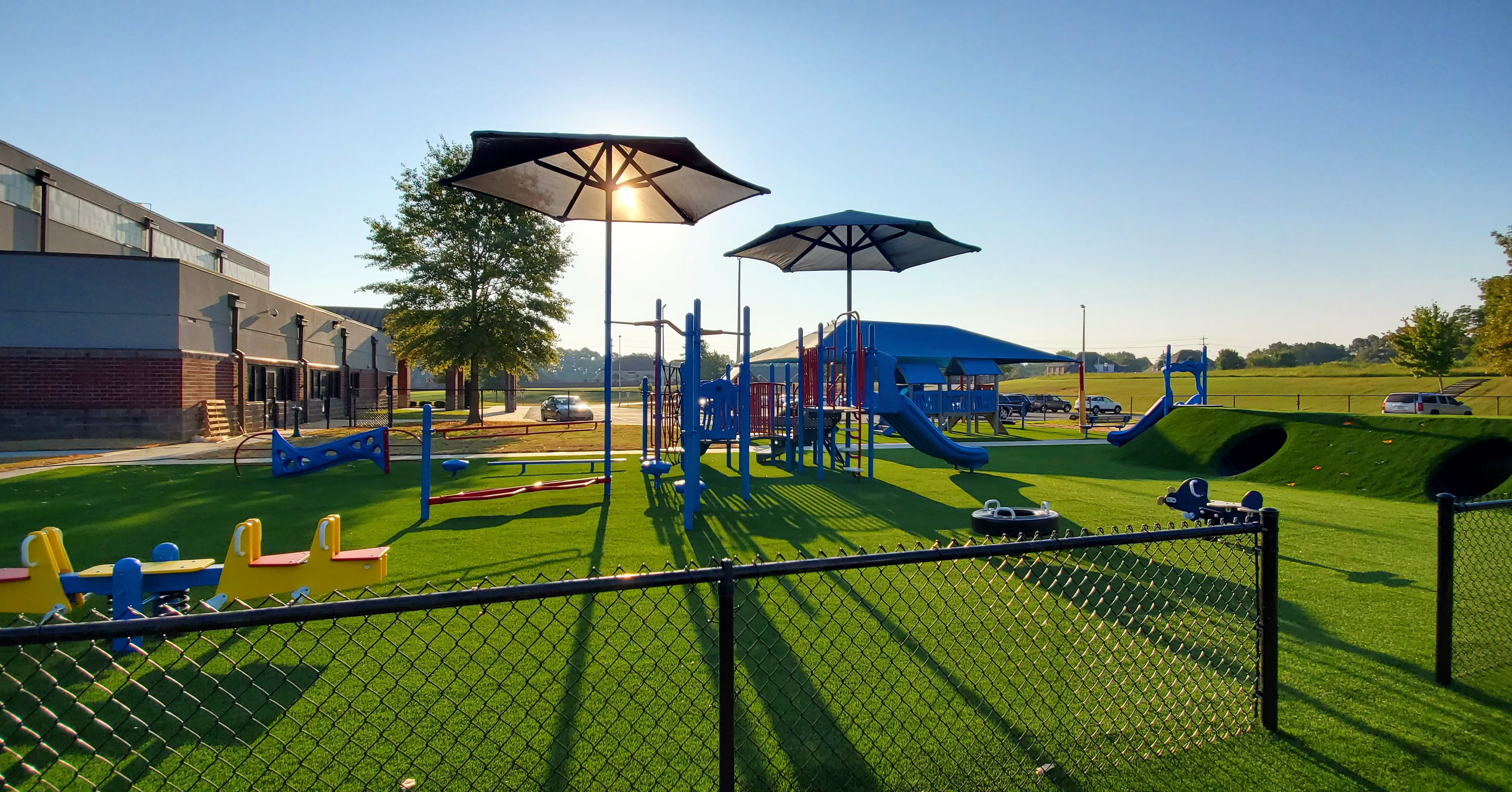

In 2018, USJ opened an academic center to provide educational support for students with learning prescriptions.

== Administration ==
Current head of the school is Don Roe, who previously was the Associate Head of School, and director of Middle School. He replaces Stuart Hirstein.

== Notable alumni ==
Ryan Rolison — MLB pitcher, Chicago Cubs

Trey Smith — NFL offensive lineman, Kansas City Chiefs, Tennessee Volunteers (Class of 2021)

Trey Teague — former NFL player, center, Denver Broncos, Buffalo Bills, New York Jets.
