= Briarcrest Christian School =

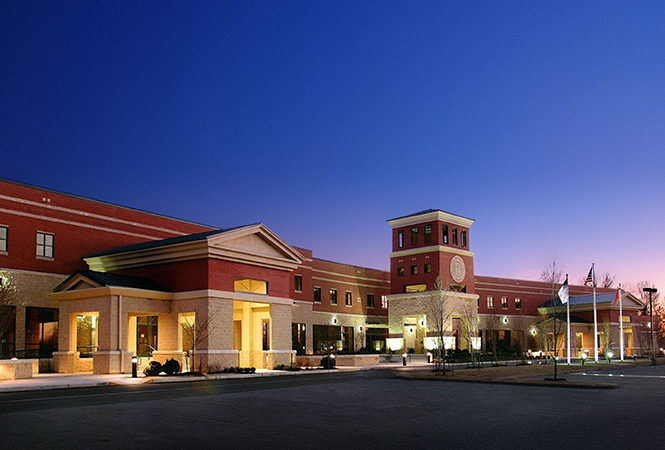

Location
- 76 S Houston Levee Rd; Eads, Tennessee 38028; 35°7′15″N 89°43′54″W

Information
- School type: Private, coeducational
- Motto: With Men, This Is Impossible; But With God, All Things Are Possible. Matthew 19:26
- Religious affiliation: Non-denominational Christian
- Established: 1973
- Founder: W. Wayne Allen
- President: Caron Swatley
- Grades: K2–12
- Enrollment: 1,750
- Colors: Green and Gold
- Fight song: When the Saints Go Marching In
- Mascot: St. Bernard dog "BC"
- Nickname: Saints
- Feeder schools: Grace-St. Luke's Episcopal School, Woodland Presbyterian School
- Website: www.briarcrest.com

Briarcrest Christian School (BCS) is a private, coeducational, Christian school in Eads, an unincorporated area of Shelby County, Tennessee, United States. The school was founded as a segregation academy during the racial integration of public schools in Memphis. Today, it serves students in kindergarten through 12th grade. The school also offers "early school" for ages 2–4.

== History ==
=== Establishment ===
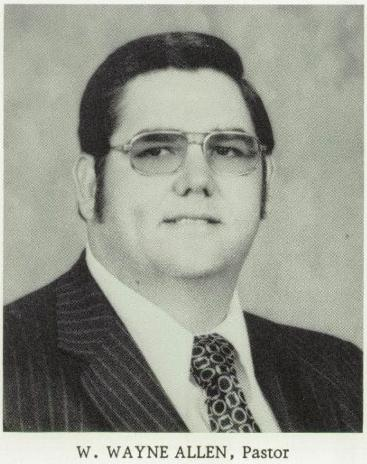
Pastor W. Wayne Allen, founder of Briarcrest Christian School

In 1970, the leaders and members of East Park Baptist Church began to plan a collection of segregation academies — schools that would allow white parents to avoid having their children in desegregated public schools — in anticipation of the court-ordered racial integration of Memphis City Schools. That order arrived in 1972, and on March 15, 1973, the church incorporated the Briarcrest Baptist School System. Briarcrest's initial faculty consisted of teachers who left public schools after desegregation. Principal Joseph A. Clayton said he and others wanted to be "back among their own" with "less fear, less culture shock" and more "cultural homogeneity". As part of the effort, the administration screened prospective teachers to ensure that all staff members believed in creationism and that no teacher would teach the theory of evolution.

In September 1973, the school system launched with 2,400 pupils attending kindergarten through eighth-grade classes at 11 Southern Baptist churches throughout the Memphis area. Tuition and fees were $650 per student (about $4,714 today), with $100 discounts for siblings. Few, if any, were black, despite a declared policy of nondiscrimination — a requirement for the school's tax-exempt status — and reported efforts by Briarcrest officials to attract African-American students. A 1976 book published by Christian Literature Crusade said those efforts included asking 10 African-American pastors in Memphis for recruiting help and advertising in the Tri-State Defender, a local minority newspaper. W. Wayne Allen, the pastor of East Park Baptist Church and head of the school system, said the black community pressured its families not to attend Briarcrest schools. "A black pastor friend of mine told me, 'Brother Allen, if I had one of your satellite schools in my church I'd be ostracized as an Uncle Tom'", Mr. Allen told the New York Times in August 1973. "I told him, 'It's too bad you folks are so segregationist.'"

=== 1970s ===
In the fall of 1974, Briarcrest narrowly won an auction for a plot of land in East Memphis, beating out a Jewish group that sought to build a synagogue. School officials, who wanted the land for their high school campus, described the victory as a divine intervention in favor of Christianity over Judaism.

Grades 9–12 were added in 1975. That year, all of the high school's 1,432 students and 69 faculty and staff members were white, despite the ostensibly open admissions policy.

In its early years, the Briarcrest system continued to hold elementary-grade classes in various churches, paying minimal rent so it could concentrate capital spending on its high school campus. Since the Briarcrest system was affiliated with a large church, it continued to attract students after other Memphis-area segregation academies shut down.

In 1979, six years after Briarcrest began operation, about 2,000 students attended classes in the churches, and another 1,800 students attended the high school. Allen, by now the chairman of the school board, proclaimed it "the largest private school in the world." Tuition in the lower grades was still $650; for high schoolers it was $1,100. A recent capital fundraising drive had netted about $400,000 to build a football stadium, and the school had recently created a development office to routinize solicitations for more funds.

None of its 3,800 students were black; indeed, only two black students had ever enrolled in Briarcrest's regular classes, and just 46 more in its summer programs, Allen said. Memphis NAACP chair Maxine Smith described the school as a "bastion of white segregation in a city with a 40% black population". Allen said the school's attempts at outreach were foiled by the black community, whose children were "pressured into staying away, feeling they'd be Uncle Toms if they came."

In February 1979, Allen was summoned to Washington, D.C., to testify at a hearing of the oversight subcommittee of the House Committee on Ways and Means. Rep. Harold Ford Sr., D-Tennessee, questioned Allen about why no black students attended Briarcrest. Allen said that "every possible effort has been made to encourage and enroll black students ... Some of the black leadership in our city says, 'Stay away; it is a racial school.' And it is not." Ford, the first black person to represent Tennessee in Congress, responded that he had never heard black leaders say that.

=== 1980s ===
In 1984, a group of black parents sued Allen in his official capacity, alleging that the school practiced discriminatory policies that require the revocation of its federal tax-exempt status. The case, Allen v. Wright, was ultimately decided by the Supreme Court, which held that the parents did not have standing to challenge the IRS ruling on the school's tax status. Afterward, Allen said he was glad the tax code could not be "used as a weapon" by those who disagreed with the school's "policies or politics".

By 1988, the school's enrollment had dwindled to 1,473 students and the school was in a precarious financial situation. School leaders feared the school would not have funds to reopen after the 1988–89 Christmas break, but a combination of teacher layoffs, staff pay cuts, and emergency fundraising allowed the school to continue classes. In 1989, the school split from the founding church and re-chartered as an independent school under the name Briarcrest Christian School.

=== 2000s ===
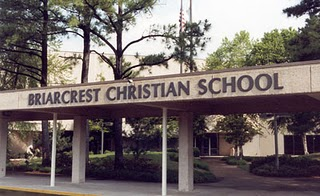
The East Memphis campus was sold in 2012.

The school and its history of racial segregation were portrayed in the 2009 film The Blind Side, though it was called "Wingate Christian School". Briarcrest officials said they did not permit the use of the school's real name because they felt that the script took excessive artistic license.

By 2010, the school had grown to 1,600 students and spent $43 million to build its campus.

In 2012, the school sold its Memphis campus to a church that had been a tenant there, though it continued to "lease space in the building for 200 students ranging from 2-year-olds to fifth graders", the Memphis Business Journal reported.

In 2021, the school attracted controversy by inviting parents to a seminar on how to "respond biblically" to children coming out or embracing an alternative gender identity. Shelby County commissioner Tami Sawyer said the school's anti-LGBT rhetoric ("hateful drivel") should be viewed in light of the school's history of racial segregation. Several alumni said that the school's homophobic teachings led them to consider suicide during their attendance.

== Program and facilities ==
Briarcrest is a non-denominational Christian school. All students attend weekly chapel services, study the Bible, and are encouraged to have what evangelical Christians describe as "a personal relationship with Jesus Christ". The school professes to teach Christian values and biblical morals; citing biblical verses, it forbids students to make statements in support of abortion, sexual promiscuity, homosexuality, same-sex attraction, and alternate gender identity.

Briarcrest offers honors, advanced placement, and dual enrollment classes. Fine arts programs begin in preschool and continue through grade 12 in visual arts, choral music, instrumental music, general music, and theater arts.

=== Accreditation and affiliations ===
The school has dual accreditation from the Southern Association of Independent Schools and the Southern Association of Colleges and Schools. Briarcrest is also a member of the Association of Christian Schools International, Tennessee Association of Independent Schools, Memphis Association of Independent Schools, and the College Board.

=== Sports ===
Briarcrest offers athletic programs including football, baseball, basketball, wrestling, cross country, golf, bowling, swimming, trap shooting, softball, lacrosse, soccer, volleyball, track, tennis, and cheerleading. The school participates in Tennessee Secondary School Athletic Association (TSSAA) Division II West AA for large schools, competing with both private and public schools in the region. Since 1998, Briarcrest has won nine state championships. Two of the football titles and four in girls' basketball were won by teams coached by Hugh Freeze, who left in 2004 and went on to become head football coach at the University of Mississippi.

In 2017, Freeze resigned abruptly from Ole Miss after he was found to have made more than a dozen calls to escort services on a university cellphone. Soon thereafter, some female former Briarcrest students alleged that Freeze had engaged in inappropriate conduct with them at the school. A Briarcrest spokeswoman said, "We are totally unaware of any allegations against Coach Freeze regarding any kind of inappropriate personal conduct while he was here at Briarcrest.”

== Notable people ==
- Tyler Badie: NFL football player
- Kennedy Chandler: NBA basketball player
- Hugh Freeze: football coach
- Keyron Crawford: college football player
- Greg Hardy: NFL football player and professional mixed martial artist
- Jim Mabry: NCAA All-American football player
- Leslie McDonald: basketball player
- Austin Nichols: basketball player
- Michael Oher: NFL football player
- Lisa Quinn: artist, actress, designer
- Jabari Small: NFL football player
- Leigh Anne Tuohy: interior designer
