= Goodlettsville, Tennessee =

- City
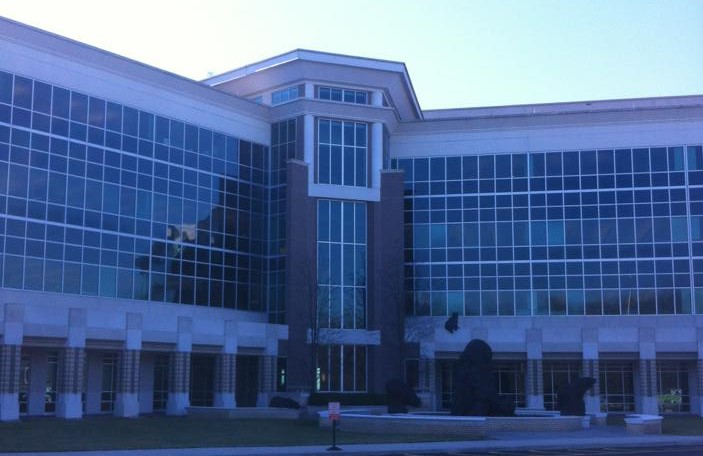
- Dollar General headquarters

- Flag Seal Logo

- Location of Goodlettsville in Davidson and Sumner Counties, Tennessee
- Coordinates: 36°19′23″N 86°42′48″W
- Country: United States
- State: Tennessee
- Counties: Davidson, Sumner
- Established: 1958

Government
  - Type: City Manager / Commission
  - Board of Commissioners: Jimmy D Anderson, Jennifer Duncan, Cisco Gilmore, Rusty Tinnin, and Jesse Walker
  - City Manager: Julie High

Area
  - Total: 14.56 sq mi (37.72 km^{2})
  - Land: 14.41 sq mi (37.32 km^{2})
  - Water: 0.16 sq mi (0.41 km^{2})
- Elevation: 479 ft (146 m)

Population (2020)
  - Total: 17,789
  - Density: 1,234.6/sq mi (476.68/km^{2})
- Time zone: UTC−6 (Central (CST))
  - Summer (DST): UTC−5 (CDT)
- ZIP Codes: 37070, 37072
- Area code(s): 615, 629
- FIPS code: 47-29920
- GNIS feature ID: 1285638
- Website: www.goodlettsville.gov

Goodlettsville is a city in Davidson and Sumner Counties in the U.S. state of Tennessee. It was incorporated as a city in 1958 with a population of just over 3,000 residents; in 2020, its population was 17,789. It is part of the Nashville metropolitan area.

The northern half of Goodlettsville is in Sumner County, while the southern half is in Davidson County. In 1963, when the city of Nashville merged with the government of Davidson County, Goodlettsville chose to remain autonomous. The city is home to the corporate headquarters of Dollar General and the Rivergate Mall shopping center.

== History ==
Long hunter and early Middle Tennessee settler Kasper Mansker was reportedly born on an immigrant ship bound for the American colonies. Little is known about his German ancestry or his early life. Mansker began to explore the wilds of Kentucky and Tennessee with a group of long hunters in 1769. A journey taken in 1772 introduced Mansker to the rich resources of Middle Tennessee, especially what is now Sumner and Davidson Counties. Near a salt lick and a large creek now known as Mansker's Creek in the present-day city of Goodlettsville, Mansker established his own fortified station, Mansker's Station, in the winter of 1779–1780, which was a winter remembered for its severe temperatures.

Goodlettsville was named for A. G. Goodlett, pastor of the Cumberland Presbyterian Church from 1848 to 1853.

In April 1892, two daughters of the white Bruce family of Goodlettsville claimed to have been assaulted. African-American brothers Ephraim and Henry Grizzard were arrested as suspects. Henry was lynched and hanged in the town on April 24, 1892. His brother Ephraim had been jailed in Nashville for the same incident. On April 30, 1892, Ephraim Grizzard was taken from jail and lynched by a mob of 10,000 in the courthouse square. His body was taken to Goodlettsville, where it was burned.

=== 21st century ===
Among the industries established in Goodlettsville is a Tyson Foods plant. As the COVID-19 pandemic spread in the state and city in the spring of 2020, the Metro Health department investigated a reported cluster of COVID-19 cases in April among employees working at the plant. They worked in close quarters and had difficulty avoiding contracting the disease, especially at a time when so little was known about its transmission. On April 22, 2020, 120 of the roughly 1,600 employees were confirmed to have been infected with COVID-19. The Centers for Disease Control and Prevention and United States Department of Agriculture participated in this investigation. Food processing plants proved to be high-risk environments for frontline employees as the pandemic progressed, although the company instituted social distancing and other measures. By May 22, 2020, some 345 Tyson employees had contracted COVID-19 at this plant. Another nearby plant had been closed to allow deep cleaning.

== Geography ==
According to the United States Census Bureau, the city has a total area of 14.3 square miles (37.1 km^{2}), of which 14.1 sq mi (36.6 km^{2}) are land and 0.15 sq mi (0.4 km^{2}) is covered by water.

== Demographics ==
Historical population
| Census | Pop. | Note | %± |
|---|---|---|---|
| 1880 | 280 | | — |
| 1890 | 529 | | 88.9% |
| 1960 | 3,163 | | — |
| 1970 | 6,168 | | 95.0% |
| 1980 | 8,327 | | 35.0% |
| 1990 | 11,219 | | 34.7% |
| 2000 | 13,780 | | 22.8% |
| 2010 | 15,921 | | 15.5% |
| 2020 | 17,789 | | 11.7% |
| 2025 (est.) | 17,506 | ▼ | −1.6% |

=== 2020 census ===
As of the 2020 census, Goodlettsville had a population of 17,789, 7,348 households, and 4,343 families, and the median age was 39.6 years.

About 20.2% of residents were under the age of 18 and 17.9% were 65 years of age or older, and for every 100 females there were 89.5 males, while for every 100 females age 18 and over there were 85.6 males.

97.2% of residents lived in urban areas, while 2.8% lived in rural areas.

Of the 7,348 households, 28.6% had children under the age of 18 living in them. Of all households, 42.9% were married-couple households, 17.7% were households with a male householder and no spouse or partner present, and 32.8% were households with a female householder and no spouse or partner present. About 29.5% of all households were made up of individuals and 11.1% had someone living alone who was 65 years of age or older.

There were 7,784 housing units, of which 5.6% were vacant. The homeowner vacancy rate was 1.4% and the rental vacancy rate was 6.6%.

Racial composition as of the 2020 census
| Race | Number | Percent |
|---|---|---|
| White | 10,910 | 61.3% |
| Black or African American | 4,113 | 23.1% |
| American Indian and Alaska Native | 94 | 0.5% |
| Asian | 512 | 2.9% |
| Native Hawaiian and Other Pacific Islander | 42 | 0.2% |
| Some other race | 712 | 4.0% |
| Two or more races | 1,406 | 7.9% |
| Hispanic or Latino (of any race) | 1,650 | 9.3% |

=== 2000 census ===
As of the census of 2000, 13,780 people, 5,601 households, and 3,825 families lved in the city. The population density was 986.5 inhabitants per square mile (380.9/km^{2}). The 5,853 housing units had an average density of 419.0 per square mile (161.8/km^{2}). The racial makeup of the city was 86.42% White, 9.83% African American, 0.22% Native American, 1.64% Asian, 0.01% Pacific Islander, 0.65% from other races, and 1.23% from two or more races. About 1.48% of the population were Hispanics or Latinos of any race.

Of the 5,601 households, 30.2% had children under 18 living with them, 52.7% were married couples living together, 12.4% had a female householder with no husband present, and 31.7% were not families. About 25.5% of all households were made up of individuals, and 7.7% had someone living alone who was 65 or older. The average household size was 2.44 and the average family size was 2.94.

In the city, the age distribution was 23.7% under 18, 8.3% from 18 to 24, 31.3% from 25 to 44, 24.8% from 45 to 64, and 11.9% who were 65 or older. The median age was 37 years. For every 100 females, there were 90.6 males. For every 100 females 18 and over, there were 86.1 males.

The median income for a household in the city was $45,690 and for a family was $54,159. Males had a median income of $40,567 versus $27,250 for females. The per capita income for the city was $22,946. 9.4% of the population and 7.5% of families were below the poverty line; 18.1% of those under 18 and 5.1% of those 65 and older were living below the poverty line.

== Local economy and attractions ==
- Associated Wholesale Grocers, located along Interstate 65—southeast distributor for independent grocers
- Bowen-Campbell House, birthplace and childhood home of William Bowen Campbell, located inside Moss-Wright Park
- Dollar General, Major Corporation with 15,000 stores is headquartered in Goodlettsville
- Forest Lawn Memorial Gardens, a cemetery where many notable musicians are interred
- Rivergate Mall, located at the corner of Rivergate Parkway and Gallatin Pike (US 31E)
- Tyson Foods, located along Interstate 65—largest fresh meat packaging plant in the world

== Little League World Series ==
Goodlettsville Little League won the state of Tennessee in 2011, but failed to win any of the three games played during the Southeast Regional.

A little league team from Goodlettsville participated in the 2012 Little League World Series in Williamsport, Pennsylvania. They won the United States Championship and qualified to play for the World Series title against the international champion. They were the fifth team from Tennessee to qualify in series history, and the first to play in the championship game. They lost to a team from Tokyo, Japan, in the finals. They were the first Tennessee team to qualify since 1987. As tournament runners-up, they were the most successful Tennessee team since 1985. They were the first to win at least two consecutive games since 1974. And, they were the first Nashville-area team to qualify since 1970. It was only the second year for little league baseball in Goodlettsville.

In 2016, a second little league team from Goodlettsville qualified for the World Series, the eighth Tennessee team to do so. The 2016 team advanced to the United States championship game, where they lost to a team from New York. They fell one game short of the World Series championship game. The team finished fourth in the world after losing the consolation game against a team from Panama, the international runner-up.

Goodlettsville won the state of Tennessee in 2017, 2019, and 2024, but did not win the Southeast regional in any of those years.

== Government and politics ==
Goodlettsville is incorporated under the city manager/commission charter. The board of commissioners is made up of five members elected at-large. The five members select a mayor and vice mayor within themselves, much like a board selects a chair and vice chair. Members of the Board of Commissioners are Jimmy D. Anderson, Jennifer Duncan, Cisco Gilmore, Rusty Tinnin, and Jesse Walker. The Goodlettsville City Commission is elected to serve four-year, alternating terms. Elections are held every two years. Julie High serves as the professional city manager, managing all day-to-day operations of the city.

The Davidson County portion of the city is split between District 50 and 54 of the Tennessee House of Representatives. Represented by Democrats Bo Mitchell and Vincent B. Dixie. The Sumner County portion of the city is in District 45 represented by Rep. Johnny Garrett, Republican.

=== Political makeup ===
Goodlettsville generally leans Republican in statewide elections, though the city has started to become highly competitive in recent elections. The portion of the city located in Sumner County is solidly Republican and typically outvotes the Democratic-leaning portion in Davidson County.

Goodlettsville Presidential election results
| Year | Republican | Democratic | Third parties |
|---|---|---|---|
| 2024 | 50.06% 3,684 | 48.16% 3,544 | 1.78% 131 |
| 2020 | 51.51% 4,413 | 46.01% 3,942 | 2.49% 213 |
| 2016 | 55.78% 3,961 | 40.16% 2,852 | 4.06% 288 |

== Education ==
Metropolitan Nashville Public School District is the school district for all of Davidson County.

Goodlettsville's Davidson County portion has two elementary schools and one middle school: Goodlettsville Elementary School, Gateway Elementary School, and Goodlettsville Middle School. Goodlettsville schools feed into Metro Nashville Schools' Hunters Lane cluster, meaning that students tend to move from Goodlettsville Middle School to Hunters Lane High School upon completion of 8th grade and promotion to 9th grade.

On the Sumner County side of the line, the only school within the city limits is Madison Creek Elementary School, which feeds to Hunter Middle School and Beech Senior High School in Hendersonville. A portion of the city is zoned for Millersville Elementary, which feeds White House Middle and High Schools.

Goodlettsville residents on the Sumner County side have the option of sending students to Sumner County's Merrol Hyde Magnet School, if the students meet its criteria. Furthermore, residents on the Davidson County side have the opportunity to send students to Head Magnet Middle School, which feeds to Martin Luther King Jr. Academic Magnet, or Meigs Magnet Middle which feeds to Hume Fogg Academic High School. Both Meigs and Head have academic requirements.

== See also ==
- April 6–8, 2006 tornado outbreak
- Impact of the 2019–20 coronavirus pandemic on the meat industry in the United States
