= 2004 McDonald's All-American Boys Game =

American high school basketball game

East	West
126	96
- Date: March 31, 2004
- Venue: Ford Center, Oklahoma City, OK
- MVP: Dwight Howard, J. R. Smith
- Referees: 1; 2; 3
- Attendance: 14,402
- Network: ESPN

McDonald's All-American

The 2004 McDonald's All-American Boys Game was an all-star basketball game played on Wednesday, March 31, 2004 at the Ford Center in Oklahoma City, Oklahoma, the future home of the NBA's Oklahoma City Thunder (then the Seattle SuperSonics). The game's rosters featured the best and most highly recruited high school boys graduating in 2004. The game was the 27th annual version of the McDonald's All-American Game first played in 1978.

The 48 players were selected from 2,500 nominees by a committee of basketball experts. They were chosen not only for their on-court skills, but for their performances off the court as well. Coach Morgan Wootten, who had more than 1,200 wins as head basketball coach at DeMatha High School, was chairman of the selection committee. Legendary UCLA coach John Wooden, who has been involved in the McDonald's All American Games since its inception, served as chairman of the Games and as an advisor to the selection committee.

Proceeds from the 2004 McDonald's All American High School Basketball Games went to Ronald McDonald House Charities (RMHC) of Oklahoma and its Ronald McDonald House program.

== 2004 game ==
The game was telecast live by ESPN. In the game's first appearance in the state of Oklahoma, the 14,424 in attendance were treated to a high scoring affair which featured seven NBA first round draft picks.

The East broke out to an early lead with their impressive inside-outside game. Five East Team players scored in double figures, led by J.R. Smith's game high 25 points. J.R. excited the crowd on numerous occasions with his high flying dunks and long distance jumpers. The East also saw a solid contribution from Dwight Howard, who amassed 19 points and eight rebounds. J.R. and Dwight shared the John R. Wooden Most Valuable Player Award. The East controlled the second half of the game, en route to their 126-96 victory.

Other key contributors for the East included, power forward Al Jefferson, who recorded 16 points and 11 rebounds, and swingman Rudy Gay, who put up 10 points and four assists. Point guard Sebastian Telfair, dished out a game-high 11 assists and Rajon Rondo, had 14 points and four assists.

The West Team had several outstanding players who shared the spotlight. DeMarcus Nelson led the West with 22 points and five rebounds. High school teammates from Detroit, Joe Crawford and Malik Hairston contributed 15 and 11 points respectively, while 6 ft 11 in (2.11 m) center Robert Swift added 10 points and five rebounds.

=== East roster ===
No.	Name	Height	Weight	Position	Hometown	High school	College of Choice
1	Corey Brewer	6-8	187	F	Portland, TN, U.S.	Portland	Florida
2	J. R. Smith	6-6	220	G / F	Newark, NJ, U.S.	St. Benedict's Prep School	North Carolina (Did Not Attend)
3	D.J. White	6-9	230	F	Tuscaloosa, AL, U.S.	Hillcrest	Indiana
4	Rajon Rondo	6-2	175	G	Mouth of Wilson, VA, U.S.	Oak Hill Academy	Kentucky
12	Dwight Howard	6-10	225	C	Atlanta, GA, U.S.	Southwest Atlanta Christian Academy	Did Not Attend
21	Randolph Morris	7-0	270	F / C	Fairburn, GA, U.S.	Landmark Christian School	Kentucky
22	Rudy Gay	6-9	215	G / F	Severn, MD, U.S.	Archbishop Spalding	Connecticut
25	Al Jefferson	6-10	265	F / C	Prentiss, MS, U.S.	Prentiss	Arkansas (Did Not Attend)
31	Sebastian Telfair	6-0	165	G	Brooklyn, NY, U.S.	Lincoln	Louisville (Did Not Attend)
35	Darius Washington, Jr.	6-2	180	G	Orlando, FL, U.S.	Edgewater	Memphis
40	Mike Williams	6-9	230	F	Camden, AL, U.S.	Wilcox Central	Texas
42	Josh Smith	6-9	215	F	Powder Springs, GA, U.S.	Oak Hill Academy	Indiana (Did Not Attend)

=== West roster ===
No.	Name	Height	Weight	Position	Hometown	High school	College of Choice
1	Jordan Farmar	6-2	170	G	Woodland Hills, CA, U.S.	Taft	UCLA
2	Malik Hairston	6-6	200	G	Detroit, MI, U.S.	Renaissance	Oregon
4	Arron Afflalo	6-5	200	G	Compton, CA, U.S.	Centennial	UCLA
12	LaMarcus Aldridge	7-0	235	F	Seagoville, TX, U.S.	Seagoville	Texas
14	Shaun Livingston	6-7	175	G	Peoria, IL, U.S.	Peoria Central	Duke (Did Not Attend)
15	Jawann McClellan	6-5	205	G	Houston, TX, U.S.	Charles H. Milby	Arizona
20	DeMarcus Nelson	6-4	210	G	Sacramento, CA, U.S.	Sheldon	Duke
21	Marvin Williams, Jr.	6-9	220	F	Bremerton, WA, U.S.	Bremerton	North Carolina
22	Daniel Gibson	6-3	205	G	Houston, TX, U.S.	Jones	Texas
31	Robert Swift	6-11	245	C	Bakersfield, CA, U.S.	Bakersfield	USC (Did Not Attend)
32	Joe Crawford	6-4	210	G	Detroit, MI, U.S.	Renaissance	Kentucky
34	Glen Davis	6-8	325	F	Baton Rouge, LA, U.S.	University Lab School	LSU

=== Coaches ===
The East team was coached by:

- Head coach Bob Flynn of Cardinal Gibbons School (Baltimore, Maryland)
- Asst Coach Neil Jones of Cardinal Gibbons School (Baltimore, Maryland)
- Asst Coach Leroy Combs of Noble High School (Noble, Oklahoma)

The West team was coached by:

- Head coach A.D. Burtschi of Putnam City High School (Oklahoma City, Oklahoma)
- Asst Coach Gary Wright of Northwest Classen High School (Oklahoma City, Oklahoma)
- Asst Coach Don Tuley of Capitol Hill High School (Oklahoma City, Oklahoma)

=== Boxscore ===
==== Visitors: East ====
##	Player	FGM/A	3PM/A	FTM/A	Points	Off Reb	Def Reb	Tot Reb	PF	Ast	TO	BS	ST	Min
1	Brewer, Corey	0-0	0-0	1-2	1	1	3	4	1	2	4	0	1	15
2	*Smith, J.R.	10-16	5-11	0-0	25	1	3	4	1	5	2	0	2	20
3	White, D.J.	1-3	0-0	5-6	7	2	3	5	1	1	1	2	0	17
4	Rondo, Rajon	7-10	0-1	0-0	14	1	3	4	0	4	3	0	2	15
12	*Howard, Dwight	9-13	1-2	0-1	19	3	5	8	2	1	2	0	0	16
21	Morris, Randolph	3-4	0-0	2-3	8	1	2	3	1	0	1	1	2	18
22	*Gay, Rudy	4-7	2-4	0-0	10	1	2	3	0	4	0	2	0	15
25	*Jefferson, Al	8-12	0-0	0-1	16	5	6	11	1	1	1	2	1	16
31	*Telfair, Sebastian	1-2	0-0	0-0	2	0	3	3	5	11	4	0	1	20
35	Washington, Darius	4-10	1-3	0-0	9	0	1	1	1	3	7	0	2	15
40	Williams, Mike	2-3	1-2	3-4	8	0	4	4	2	1	2	0	0	14
42	Smith, Josh	3-7	1-3	0-0	7	0	4	4	4	0	1	1	1	19
	TEAM					1		1						
	Totals	52-87	11-26	11-17	126	16	39	55	19	33	28	8	12	200

==== Home: West ====
##	Player	FGM/A	3PM/A	FTM/A	Points	Off Reb	Def Reb	Tot Reb	PF	Ast	TO	BS	ST	Min
1	Farmer, Jordan	3-6	0-2	0-0	6	0	1	1	2	3	4	0	7	19
2	*Hairston, Malik	5-10	1-4	0-0	11	3	0	3	1	3	0	0	1	22
4	*Afflalo, Arron	1-7	0-6	1-2	3	2	2	4	1	1	4	0	1	17
12	Aldridge, LaMarcus	2-4	0-0	1-2	5	0	1	1	2	0	0	1	2	11
14	*Livingston, Shaun	0-4	0-0	1-2	1	0	1	1	0	3	2	0	2	15
15	McClellan, Jawann	0-6	0-2	3-4	3	1	1	2	1	0	3	0	2	16
20	Nelson, DeMarcus	9-15	0-3	4-6	22	3	2	5	2	2	2	0	2	14
21	*Williams, Marvin	1-6	1-2	0-0	3	1	0	1	0	0	0	0	0	17
22	Gibson, Daniel	3-8	2-6	0-0	8	0	1	1	0	2	0	0	1	16
31	*Swift, Robert	4-7	0-0	2-6	10	3	2	5	4	0	3	1	0	19
32	Crawford, Joe	6-12	1-1	2-4	15	1	4	5	0	1	0	0	2	17
34	Davis, Glen	4-9	0-1	1-2	9	5	4	9	1	1	1	0	2	17
	TEAM					3	3	6						
	Totals	38-94	5-27	15-28	96	22	22	44	14	16	19	2	22	200

(* = Starting Line-up)

== All-American Week ==
=== Schedule ===
- Monday, March 29: Powerade JamFest
  - Slam Dunk Contest
  - Three-Point Shoot-out
- Wednesday, March 31: 27th Annual Boys All-American Game

The Powerade JamFest is a skills-competition evening featuring basketball players who demonstrate their skills in two crowd-entertaining ways. The slam dunk contest was first held in 1987, and a 3-point shooting challenge was added in 1989.

=== Contest winners ===
- The 2004 Powerade Slam Dunk contest was won by a member of the women's team, Candace Parker. This was only the second time a woman has participated in the slam dunk competition, and the first time a woman won the contest.
