= Brent Alexander =

American football player (born 1971)

No. 26, 27, 46
- Position: Safety

Personal information
- Born: July 10, 1971 (age 55); Gallatin, Tennessee, U.S.
- Listed height: 5 ft 11 in (1.80 m)
- Listed weight: 189 lb (86 kg)

Career information
- High school: Gallatin
- College: Tennessee State
- NFL draft: 1994: undrafted

Career history
- Arizona Cardinals (1994–1997); Carolina Panthers (1998–1999); Pittsburgh Steelers (2000–2003); New York Giants (2004–2005)

Career NFL statistics
- Tackles: 898
- Interceptions: 28
- Sacks: 8
- Stats at Pro Football Reference

Ronald Brent Alexander (born July 10, 1971) is an American former professional football player who was a safety in the National Football League (NFL). He played college football for the Tennessee State Tigers before playing in the NFL for the Arizona Cardinals, Carolina Panthers, Pittsburgh Steelers, and New York Giants. After retirement, he spent three years as the head coach at Station Camp High School in his hometown of Gallatin.

== Biography ==
Alexander was born in Gallatin, Tennessee and graduated from Gallatin High School in Gallatin. He played college football at Tennessee State University. He was signed as an undrafted free agent by the Arizona Cardinals in 1994. He played in the NFL for twelve years.

After retiring from the NFL, Alexander became a high school math teacher.

== NFL career statistics ==
Legend
| **Bold** | Career high |

=== Regular season ===
| Year | Team | Games | | Tackles | | | | Interceptions | | | | Fumbles | | | |
| Year | Team | GP | GS | Comb | Solo | Ast | Sck | Int | Yds | TD | Lng | FF | FR | Yds | TD |
|---|---|---|---|---|---|---|---|---|---|---|---|---|---|---|---|
| 1994 | ARI | 16 | 7 | 36 | 26 | 10 | 0.0 | 0 | 0 | 0 | 0 | 0 | 0 | 0 | 0 |
| 1995 | ARI | 16 | 13 | 68 | 51 | 17 | 0.5 | 2 | 14 | 0 | 14 | **2** | 1 | 0 | 0 |
| 1996 | ARI | 16 | 15 | 81 | 52 | **29** | 0.0 | 2 | 3 | 0 | 3 | **2** | 0 | 0 | 0 |
| 1997 | ARI | 16 | 15 | 76 | 54 | 22 | 0.0 | 0 | 0 | 0 | 0 | 1 | 0 | 0 | 0 |
| 1998 | CAR | 16 | 16 | **97** | 68 | **29** | 0.0 | 0 | 0 | 0 | 0 | 1 | 1 | 12 | 0 |
| 1999 | CAR | 16 | 16 | 84 | **72** | 12 | 0.0 | 2 | 18 | 0 | 18 | 0 | 0 | 0 | 0 |
| 2000 | PIT | 16 | 16 | 80 | 65 | 15 | 1.5 | 3 | 31 | 0 | 15 | 1 | 1 | 0 | 0 |
| 2001 | PIT | 16 | 16 | 73 | 53 | 20 | **2.0** | **4** | 39 | 0 | 22 | 1 | 0 | 0 | 0 |
| 2002 | PIT | 16 | 16 | 77 | 52 | 25 | 1.0 | **4** | 37 | 0 | 25 | 0 | 0 | 0 | 0 |
| 2003 | PIT | 16 | 16 | 85 | 62 | 23 | 1.0 | **4** | **63** | 0 | **34** | 0 | **2** | 2 | 0 |
| 2004 | NYG | 16 | 16 | 80 | 56 | 24 | **2.0** | 3 | 3 | 0 | 2 | 1 | **2** | **29** | 0 |
| 2005 | NYG | 16 | 16 | 61 | 46 | 15 | 0.0 | **4** | 45 | 0 | 24 | 0 | 1 | 9 | 0 |
| | | 192 | 178 | 898 | 657 | 241 | 8.0 | 28 | 253 | 0 | 34 | 9 | 8 | 52 | 0 |

=== Playoffs ===
| Year | Team | Games | | Tackles | | | | Interceptions | | | | Fumbles | | | |
| Year | Team | GP | GS | Comb | Solo | Ast | Sck | Int | Yds | TD | Lng | FF | FR | Yds | TD |
|---|---|---|---|---|---|---|---|---|---|---|---|---|---|---|---|
| 2001 | PIT | 2 | 2 | 6 | 5 | 1 | 0.0 | **2** | **32** | 0 | **32** | 0 | 0 | 0 | 0 |
| 2002 | PIT | 2 | 2 | **14** | **9** | **5** | 0.0 | 0 | 0 | 0 | 0 | 0 | 0 | 0 | 0 |
| 2005 | NYG | 1 | 1 | 8 | 5 | 3 | 0.0 | 0 | 0 | 0 | 0 | 0 | 0 | 0 | 0 |
| | | 5 | 5 | 28 | 19 | 9 | 0.0 | 2 | 32 | 0 | 32 | 0 | 0 | 0 | 0 |
