= Hendersonville High School (Tennessee) =

Public school in Hendersonville, US

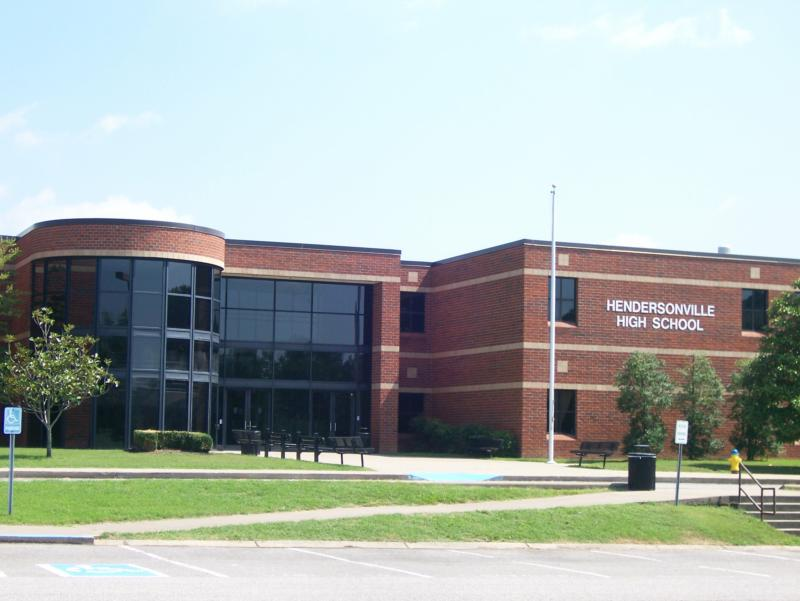
- Front entrance to school

Location
- 123 Cherokee Road; Hendersonville, Tennessee 37075; United States; 36.30294°N 86.60636°W

Information
- Type: Public School
- Motto: "A quality education for quality living"
- School district: Sumner County Schools
- Principal: Ardrel "Mel" Sawyers
- Teaching staff: 94.68 (FTE)
- Enrollment: 1,410 (2025-26)
- Student to teacher ratio: 15.28
- Campus: Suburban
- Color
- Mascot: Commando
- Website: http://hhs.sumnerschools.org/

Hendersonville High School is one of three public high schools located in Hendersonville, Sumner County, Tennessee. The Hendersonville High School is part of the Sumner County Schools district. Two middle schools feed into Hendersonville High: Ellis Middle School and Hawkins Middle School.

Hendersonville participates in 6A level sports as a part of the Tennessee Secondary School Athletic Association, and maintains athletic programs including track, swimming, softball, bowling, baseball, wrestling, golf, hockey, soccer, football, cross country, marching band, and basketball. The school has rivalries with Gallatin High School, Beech High School and Station Camp High School.

Family Circle magazine gave Hendersonville High School a gold star for 315 seniors who logged around 20,000 hours of community service. As of 2026, Hendersonville has an "above average" 7/10 rating on greatschools.net.

== History ==
The school was founded in Hendersonville, Tennessee in 1941. The school's colors have been black and gold ever since the first Commando football team was established right after its founding, when the Vanderbilt University football program provided the first Commando football team with older, used jerseys. The black and gold colors have remained ever since. Hendersonville is known as the Commandos because 54 men were sent to fight in World War II.

Taylor Swift attended the school until she left to begin homeschooling. After Swift donated funds to refurbish the auditorium's lighting and sound equipment, the auditorium was renamed "Taylor Swift Auditorium" in her honor.

== Demographics ==
As of 2026, Hendersonville High School has a student population of 1,410 that is 0.1% Pacific Islander, 0.6% Native American, 2.3% Asian, 2.9% multiracial, 10.9% black, 11.8% Hispanic, and 71.3% white.

== Athletics ==
Sports and state titles:

- Baseball
- Boys' Basketball
- Girls' Basketball
- Boys' Bowling 2002, 2003, 2004
- Girls' Bowling 2008, 2009
- Cheerleading 1997, 1998, 2001, 2008, 2013, 2014, 2018, 2019
- Boys' Cross Country
- Girls' Cross Country
- Football
- Golden Girls Dance Team
- Boys' Golf 2010, 2011, 2012, 2014
- Girls' Golf
- Boys' Soccer 1989, 1998, 2010
- Girls' Soccer
- Softball
- Boys' Tennis
- Girls' Tennis
- Boys' Track 1974, 1975, 1976, 1989, 1990
- Girls' Track 1985, 1993, 2004, 2005
- Wrestling 1993, 2004, 2006
- Dual Wrestling
- Girls' Wrestling
- Volleyball

=== Football ===
Hendersonville's home football games are held at Paul Decker Field. The on-campus stadium is named after retired principal Paul Decker, and has a capacity of 5,500 spectators. Before home games, players walk around the field in what is known as the "Commando Walk". In inclement weather, the Commandos practice in the Steven Chaussey field house, a 60 by 40 yard (55 m by 37 m) practice facility. They also work out in their workout facility called the "Iron Bunker".

=== Cheerleading ===
For the first time ever, Hendersonville High School won the National cheerleading champions in 2021.

=== Soccer ===
2007 Region Champions

The Hendersonville High School boys' soccer team has won five Tennessee State Championships: 1983, 1986, 1989, 1998, and 2010. Hendersonville Soccer also has a soccer-specific facility, called "The Field of Dreams", located in Drakes Creek Park.

=== Swimming ===
Hendersonville High School swimming has had over 37 swimming All-American performances over the past decade. Swimming has produced more All-Americans than all other sports combined at Hendersonville High School.

=== Ice hockey ===
The HHS Ice Hockey team was established in 2000. The first coach was Chris Morris, who was followed by the current coach Tim Rathert. The HHS Commandos have qualified for the state tournament, the Predator's Cup, for the past five years. They play in the Greater Nashville Area Scholastic Hockey league. In 2011, they represented GNASH and state of Tennessee at the USA Hockey High School national tournament, held in Salt Lake City, Utah.

== Notable alumni ==
- Josh Berry, NASCAR driver
- Zac Curtis, professional baseball pitcher
- DeWayne Dotson, retired football player
- Steven Fox, golfer, 2012 U.S. Amateur champion
- Rachael Price, lead singer of band Lake Street Dive
- Thomas Richardson aka, Tommy "Wildfire" Rich, professional wrestler
- Taylor Swift, Grammy Award-winning singer-songwriter, attended Hendersonville High School for two years
- James Wilhoit, professional football kicker
- Joejuan Williams, professional football defensive back
