= Corey Brewer =

American basketball player (born 1986)

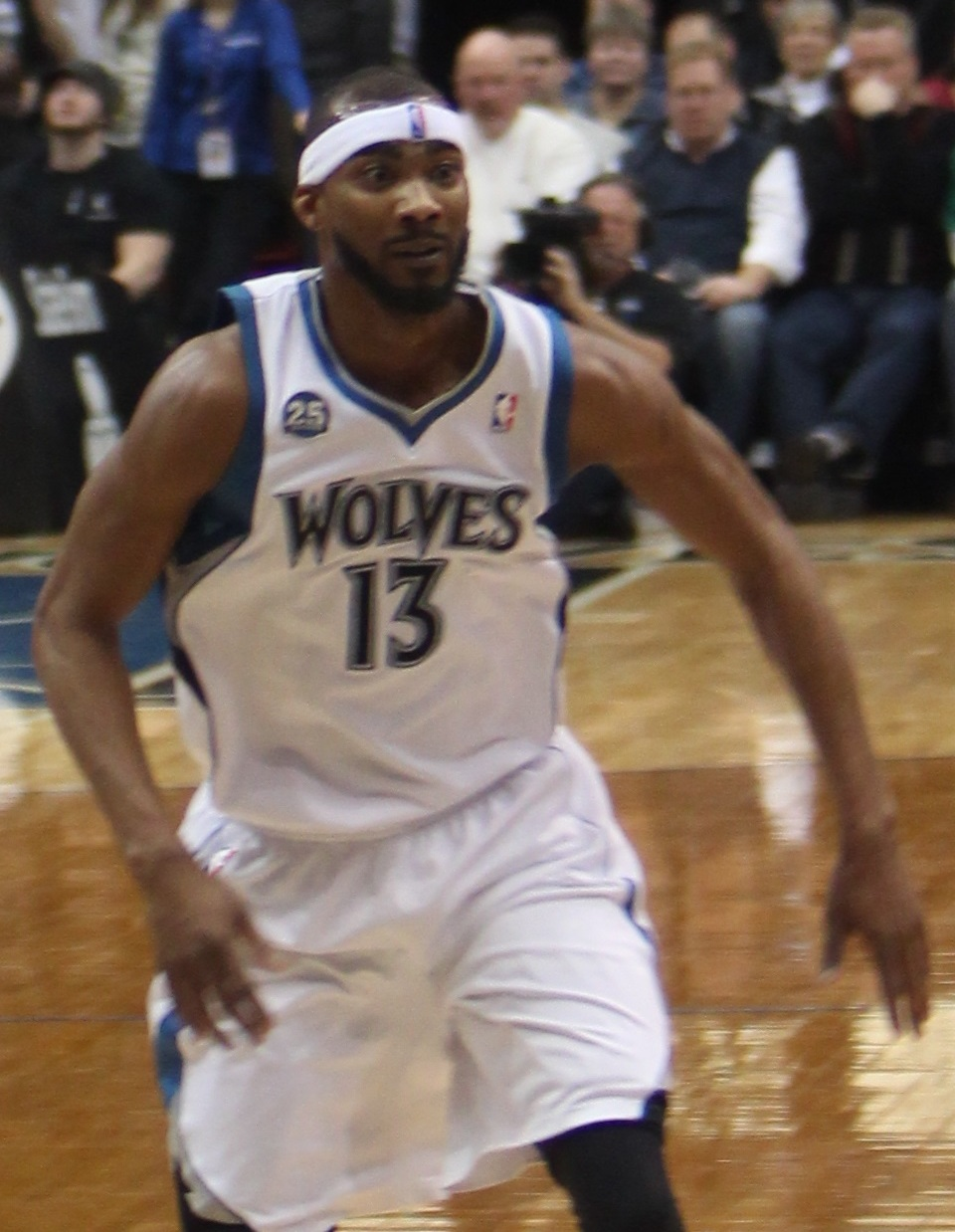
- Brewer with the Minnesota Timberwolves in 2014

Arkansas State Red Wolves
- Title: Assistant coach
- League: Sun Belt Conference

Personal information
- Born: March 5, 1986 (age 40) Portland, Tennessee, U.S.
- Listed height: 6 ft 9 in (2.06 m)
- Listed weight: 188 lb (85 kg)

Career information
- High school: Portland (Portland, Tennessee)
- College: Florida (2004–2007)
- NBA draft: 2007: 1st round, 7th overall pick
- Drafted by: Minnesota Timberwolves
- Playing career: 2007–2020
- Position: Small forward
- Number: 22, 13, 33, 3, 00
- Coaching career: 2020–present

Career history

Playing
- 2007–2011: Minnesota Timberwolves
- 2011: Dallas Mavericks
- 2011–2013: Denver Nuggets
- 2013–2014: Minnesota Timberwolves
- 2014–2017: Houston Rockets
- 2017–2018: Los Angeles Lakers
- 2018: Oklahoma City Thunder
- 2019: Philadelphia 76ers
- 2019–2020: Sacramento Kings

Coaching
- 2020–2026: New Orleans Pelicans (assistant)
- 2026–present: Arkansas State (assistant)

Career highlights
- NBA champion (2011); 2× NCAA champion (2006, 2007); NCAA Final Four Most Outstanding Player (2007); Fourth-team Parade All-American (2004); McDonald's All-American (2004); Class AA Tennessee Mr. Basketball (2004)

Career NBA statistics
- Points: 7,097 (8.7 ppg)
- Rebounds: 2,287 (2.8 rpg)
- Assists: 1,250 (1.5 apg)
- Stats at NBA.com
- Stats at Basketball Reference

Corey Wayne Brewer (born March 5, 1986) is an American former professional basketball player, and current assistant coach at Arkansas State of the Sun Belt Conference. He played college basketball for the Florida Gators, winning back-to-back NCAA national championships in 2006 and 2007. He was named Most Outstanding Player of the 2007 NCAA tournament. In 2007, Brewer was drafted by the Minnesota Timberwolves and went on to have a 13-year NBA career.

== Early years ==
Brewer was born in Portland, Tennessee. He attended Portland High School, where he played high school basketball for the Portland Panthers. As a 6'7 174 lbs senior in the 2003–04 season, Brewer averaged 29.4 points and 12.8 rebounds per game and was named the Tennessee Secondary School Athletic Association (TSSAA) Class 2A "Mr. Basketball", McDonald's All American, and a fourth-team Parade All-American.

Considered a four-star recruit by Rivals.com, Brewer was listed as the No. 7 small forward and the No. 31 player in the nation in 2004.

== College career ==
Brewer accepted an athletic scholarship to attend the University of Florida, where he played for coach Billy Donovan's Florida Gators men's basketball team from 2004 to 2007. Brewer was one of four key freshman members of Donovan's 2004 recruiting class who would have a dramatic impact on the Gators' fortunes over the next three seasons. Propelled by the 2004 class, the Gators would win the first three SEC basketball tournament championships in team history (2005, 2006, 2007), and two back-to-back NCAA Tournament national championships (2006, 2007) with the same starting line-up.

Brewer recorded the first triple-double in Gators team history on December 18, 2005, posting 15 points, 10 rebounds and 13 assists (the 13 assists were the most by a Gator since Jason Williams had a team record 17 in 1997).

He was projected by ESPN.com's Chad Ford to be a lottery pick to mid-first-round pick in the 2006 NBA draft if he had entered the draft that year. However, Brewer, along with teammates Joakim Noah and Al Horford announced at the championship pep rally that they would be returning for their junior seasons in pursuit of their second NCAA Tournament championship. Following the Gators' second NCAA championship, Brewer chose to enter the NBA draft on April 5, 2007, along with teammates Noah and Horford.

== Professional career ==
=== Minnesota Timberwolves (2007–2011) ===
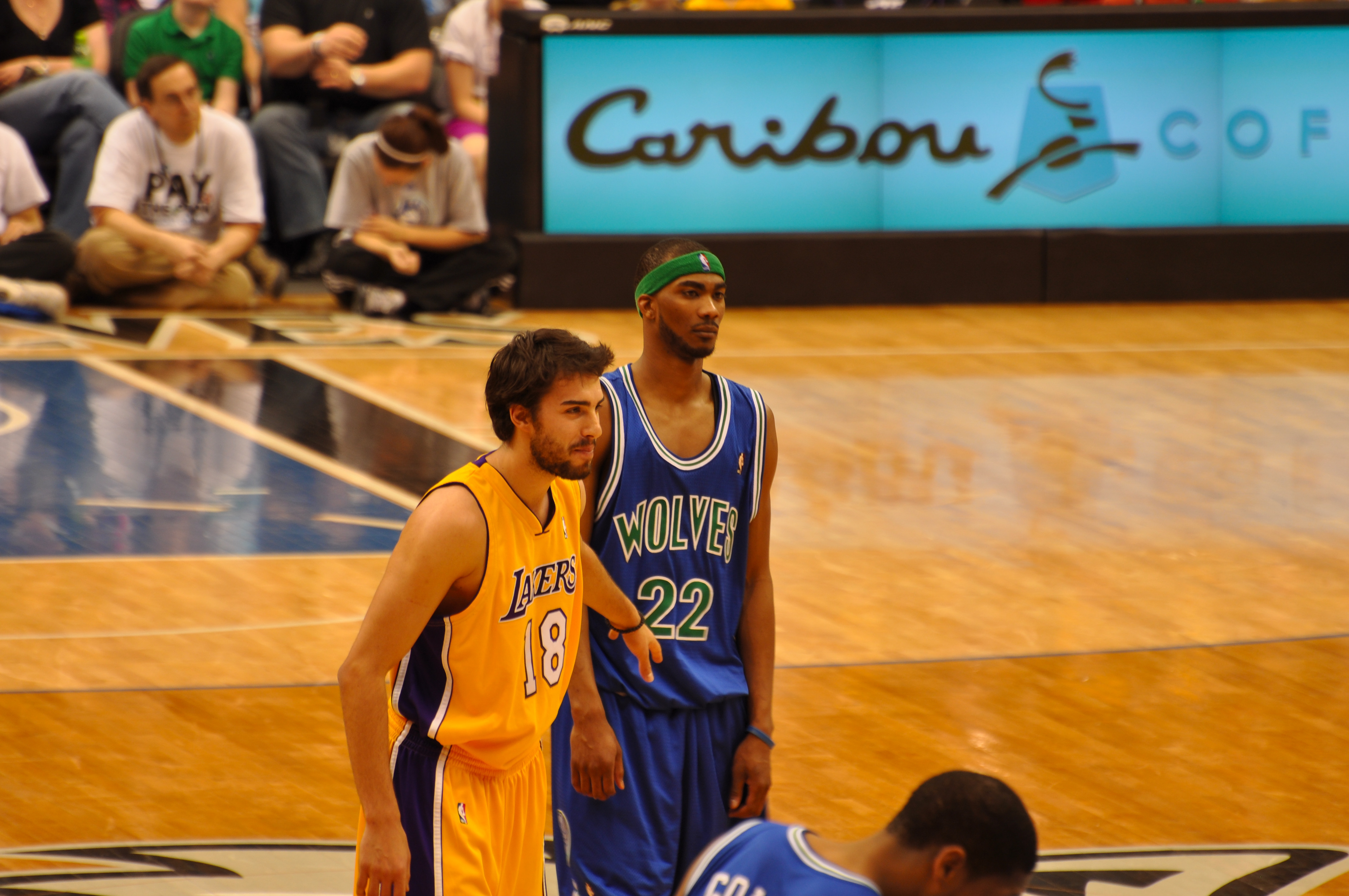
Brewer (right) with the Timberwolves in April 2010

Brewer was selected seventh overall by the Minnesota Timberwolves in the 2007 NBA draft. Due to the retirement of the No. 2 jersey in Minnesota worn by the deceased Malik Sealy, Brewer expressed the desire to wear No. 22 instead. He officially adopted the No. 22 for the season's summer leagues, in Las Vegas, Nevada.

On December 1, 2008, it was announced that Brewer had sustained an ACL tear during a game versus the Denver Nuggets on November 29, 2008. This would cause Brewer to miss the rest of the 2008–09 NBA season.

=== Dallas Mavericks (2011) ===
On February 22, 2011, Brewer was traded to the New York Knicks in a three-way blockbuster trade that also brought Carmelo Anthony from the Nuggets to New York. On March 1, 2011, he was waived by the Knicks without playing a game for them.

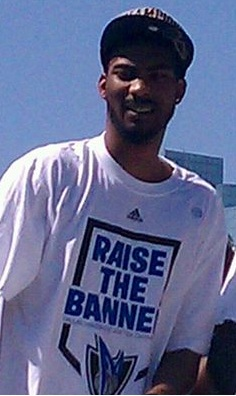
Brewer at the Mavericks' 2011 championship parade

On March 3, 2011, Brewer signed a three-year, $8 million contract with the Dallas Mavericks. He went on to win his first NBA Championship with the Mavericks when they defeated the Miami Heat in six games in the 2011 NBA Finals.

=== Denver Nuggets (2011–2013) ===
On December 13, 2011, Brewer and Rudy Fernández were traded to the Denver Nuggets for a future second-round pick and a traded player exception.

=== Return to Minnesota (2013–2014) ===
On July 12, 2013, Brewer signed a reported three-year, $15 million contract with the Minnesota Timberwolves, returning to the franchise for a second stint.

On April 11, 2014, Brewer scored a career-high 51 points in a 112–110 win over the Houston Rockets. In doing so he joined Michael Jordan, Allen Iverson and Rick Barry as the only players to record 50-plus points and 6-plus steals in one game. He also tied Kevin Love's then-franchise record for most points in a game.

=== Houston Rockets (2014–2017) ===
On December 19, 2014, Brewer was acquired by the Houston Rockets in a three-team trade that also involved the Timberwolves and the Philadelphia 76ers. Three days later, he made his debut for the Rockets against the Portland Trail Blazers. In just under 23 minutes of action off the bench, he recorded 12 points, 4 rebounds, 4 assists, 5 steals and 1 block in a 110–95 win. On February 21, 2015, he recorded season-highs of 26 points and 10 rebounds in a 98–76 win over the Toronto Raptors. During the Semi Finals of the 2015 NBA Playoffs, Brewer scored 19 points, grabbed 10 rebounds and 2 assists off the bench, leading the Rockets to a decisive victory over the Clippers in Game 6 — which saw the Rockets come back from a 3–1 deficit and head to the Western Conference Finals.

On July 14, 2015, Brewer re-signed with the Rockets to a three-year, $23.4 million contract. On January 22, 2016, he picked up the team's starting small forward role. On February 4, in his ninth start of the season, Brewer scored a season-high 24 points in a 111–105 win over the Phoenix Suns.

=== Los Angeles Lakers (2017–2018) ===
On February 23, 2017, Brewer was traded, along with a 2017 first round draft pick, to the Los Angeles Lakers in exchange for Lou Williams. On February 28, 2018, he was waived by the Lakers after reaching a buyout agreement.

=== Oklahoma City Thunder (2018) ===
On March 3, 2018, Brewer signed with the Oklahoma City Thunder. The signing reunited Brewer with his former college coach Billy Donovan. On March 16, 2018, he scored 22 points and matched a career high with six steals in a 121–113 win over the Los Angeles Clippers.

=== Philadelphia 76ers (2019) ===
On January 15, 2019, Brewer signed a 10-day contract with the Philadelphia 76ers. On January 25, he signed a second 10-day contract with the 76ers. Following the expiration of his second 10-day contract, the 76ers parted ways with Brewer, deciding not to sign him for the rest of the season.

=== Sacramento Kings (2019–2020) ===
On February 8, 2019, Brewer signed a 10-day contract with the Sacramento Kings. He went on to sign a second 10-day contract on February 18, and a rest-of-season contract on February 28. After spending the whole of the 2019–20 NBA season (before it was suspended) as a free agent, Brewer re-signed with the Kings on June 23, 2020, prior to the planned resumption of the season.

=== BIG3 Basketball (2022-Present) ===
In 2022, Brewer joined the Big 3 basketball league, a 3-on-3 half-court basketball league. Going into the new season in 2026, he is a part of the Houston Rig Hands. Previously, Brewer played with many other teams, and in 2024, while playing for Bivouac, he won a championship. He plays in the league while still coaching for the New Orleans Pelicans and has shown no indication that he will retire from the league.

== Coaching career ==
=== New Orleans Pelicans ===
On November 16, 2020, the New Orleans Pelicans announced that they had hired Brewer as a player development coach, at the same time announcing his retirement from the NBA.

On September 27, 2024, Brewer was promoted to assistant coach by the Pelicans. On April 17, 2026, it was announced that Brewer would not return to the Pelicans' staff for the 2026–27 NBA season.

=== Arkansas State Red Wolves ===
On September 4, 2026, Brewer joined the Arkansas State Red Wolves as an assistant coach under head coach Ryan Pannone.

== NBA career statistics ==
Legend
GP	Games played	GS	Games started	MPG	Minutes per game
FG%	Field goal percentage	3P%	3-point field goal percentage	FT%	Free throw percentage
RPG	Rebounds per game	APG	Assists per game	SPG	Steals per game
BPG	Blocks per game	PPG	Points per game	**Bold**	Career high
†	Won an NBA championship	*	Led the league

=== Regular season ===
Year	Team	GP	GS	MPG	FG%	3P%	FT%	RPG	APG	SPG	BPG	PPG
2007–08	Minnesota	79	35	22.8	.374	.194	**.800**	3.7	1.4	1.0	.3	5.8
2008–09	Minnesota	15	8	20.5	.411	**.417**	.737	3.3	1.7	1.0	.2	6.2
2009–10	Minnesota	**82***	**82***	30.3	.431	.346	.648	3.4	2.4	1.4	**.4**	**13.0**
2010–11	Minnesota	56	22	24.3	.384	.263	.708	2.7	1.4	1.6	.2	8.6
2010–11†	Dallas	13	2	11.4	.490	.308	.714	1.8	.9	.8	.2	5.3
2011–12	Denver	59	17	21.8	.434	.260	.692	2.5	1.5	1.2	.3	8.9
2012–13	Denver	**82***	2	24.4	.425	.296	.690	2.9	1.5	1.4	.3	12.1
2013–14	Minnesota	81	81	**32.2**	.481	.280	.718	2.6	1.7	1.9	**.4**	12.3
2014–15	Minnesota	24	16	28.3	.418	.195	.705	**3.9**	**3.3**	**2.3**	.2	10.5
2014–15	Houston	56	1	25.1	.429	.284	.764	3.6	1.7	1.1	.3	11.9
2015–16	Houston	**82***	12	20.4	.384	.272	.750	2.4	1.3	1.0	.2	7.2
2016–17	Houston	58	8	15.9	.414	.234	.727	2.0	1.1	.6	.2	4.2
2016–17	L.A. Lakers	24	3	14.9	.438	.208	.750	2.2	1.5	1.0	.3	5.4
2017–18	L.A. Lakers	54	2	12.9	.453	.186	.667	1.7	.8	.8	.1	3.7
2017–18	Oklahoma City	18	16	28.6	.444	.343	.795	3.4	1.3	2.1	.3	10.1
2018–19	Philadelphia	7	3	20.0	.408	.286	.692	2.4	1.4	1.7	.3	7.6
2018–19	Sacramento	24	0	14.7	.446	.333	.733	2.5	1.2	.8	.2	4.1
2019–20	Sacramento	5	0	6.6	**.500**	.000	.333	1.6	.4	.8	–	1.0
Career		819	310	22.9	.425	.284	.713	2.8	1.5	1.2	.3	8.7

=== Playoffs ===
Year	Team	GP	GS	MPG	FG%	3P%	FT%	RPG	APG	SPG	BPG	PPG
2011†	Dallas	6	0	3.8	.444	.333	.000	.3	.2	.7	.0	1.5
2012	Denver	7	0	16.6	.426	.300	.750	2.0	.9	1.0	.3	8.3
2013	Denver	6	0	24.3	.309	.250	.667	1.8	1.2	1.0	.2	10.8
2015	Houston	**17**	0	**25.2**	.431	.286	.636	**2.8**	1.1	.6	.2	**11.2**
2016	Houston	5	1	15.4	.259	.100	.875	1.4	**1.6**	.0	.2	4.4
2018	Oklahoma City	6	**6**	**25.2**	**.520**	**.455**	**1.000**	2.2	.8	**1.2**	**.8**	6.2
Career		47	7	20.0	.400	.279	.694	2.0	1.0	.7	.3	8.1

== See also ==
- List of Florida Gators in the NBA
