= Chase Burns =

American baseball player (born 2003)

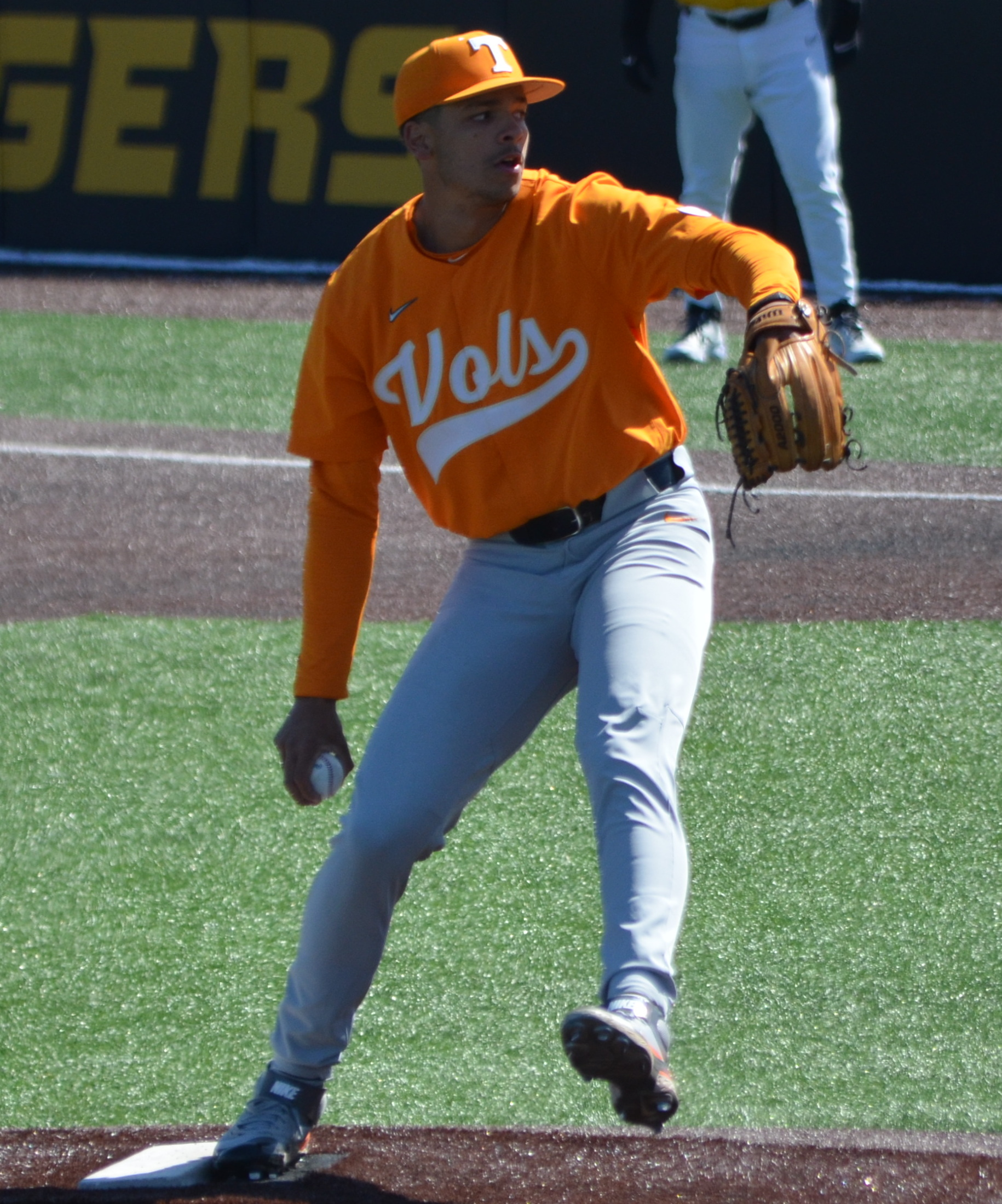
- Burns with Tennessee in 2023

Cincinnati Reds – No. 26
- Pitcher
- Born: January 16, 2003 (age 23); Naples, Italy
- Bats: Right Throws: Right

MLB debut
- June 24, 2025, for the Cincinnati Reds

MLB statistics (through 2026 season)
- Win–loss record: 15–6
- Earned run average: 3.23
- Strikeouts: 252
- Stats at Baseball Reference

Teams
- Cincinnati Reds (2025–present)

Career highlights and awards
- All-Star (2026)

Chase David Burns (born January 16, 2003) is an American professional baseball pitcher for the Cincinnati Reds of Major League Baseball (MLB). He played college baseball for the Tennessee Volunteers and Wake Forest Demon Deacons. Burns was selected by the Reds with the second overall pick in the 2024 MLB draft and made his MLB debut in 2025. Burns was named to his first All-Star game in 2026.

== Early life ==
Burns was born at the U.S. military base in Naples, Italy. Burns’ parents were stationed at Naval Support Activity Naples while serving in the United States Navy. Burns credits his parents military background with instilling in him “the value of being hard and dedicated in everyday life.” The Burns family only lived in Italy for around eight months before moving back to the United States. Burns grew up in Gallatin, Tennessee and initially attended Station Camp High School. He transferred to Beech Senior High School before the start of his senior year. Burns was selected in the 20th round of the 2021 Major League Baseball draft by the San Diego Padres, but did not sign with the team.

== Amateur career ==
Burns entered his freshman season at Tennessee as a member of the Volunteers' starting rotation. He finished the season with a 8-2 record and 2.91 ERA with 103 strikeouts in 81 1/3 innings pitched. Burns was named the Freshman Pitcher of the Year by the National Collegiate Baseball Writers Association at the end of the season.

Burns entered his sophomore season as a member of the Volunteers' starting rotation, but was moved to a relief role midway through the season after going 2-3 with a 6.10 ERA as starter. In postseason play, he allowed only one run scored and struck out 22 over 16 innings pitched, including throwing six scoreless innings with nine strikeouts in a 6-4 win over Stanford in the 2023 Men's College World Series. He finished the season with a 5-3 record and two saves with a 4.25 ERA and 114 strikeouts over 72 innings pitched. After the season, he entered the NCAA transfer portal.

Burns ultimately transferred to Wake Forest. At Wake Forest, he set a school record with 191 strikeouts in a single season and was named Atlantic Coast Conference Baseball Pitcher of the Year.

== Professional career ==
The Cincinnati Reds selected Burns in the first round of the 2024 Major League Baseball draft with the second overall pick. On July 18, he signed with the team for $9.25 million, breaking the MLB signing bonus record set by Paul Skenes the year prior. After the draft, Burns began working out at the Reds spring training site, Goodyear Ballpark, and was then was assigned to the Arizona Instructional League.

Burns made his professional debut with the Dayton Dragons on April 4, 2025, and swiftly advanced through the Reds minor league system. After three appearances in High-A, he was promoted to the Double-A Chattanooga Lookouts. In eight appearances at the Double-A level, he added a changeup to his pitch mix. He soon joined the Triple-A Louisville Bats for two starts. Across 13 starts between the three clubs for the 2025 season, Burns had a 7-3 record, a 1.77 ERA, and 89 strikeouts across 66 innings.

On June 24, 2025, the Reds promoted Burns to the big leagues for the first time. He was the first pitcher of the 2024 draft class to be promoted to the majors. He is also the sixth Italian-born pitcher in Major League Baseball, and the first since the 2024 season. Burns made his MLB debut as Cincinnati's starting pitcher against the New York Yankees and struck out eight batters, including five in a row to start the game. Amongst the five in a row, Burns struck out three MVPs in a row (Aaron Judge, Cody Bellinger, Paul Goldschmidt). He became the first starting pitcher since at least the Expansion Era (1961) to strike out the first five batters to open a debut. He allowed six hits, three earned runs, and earned a no-decision in his MLB debut. Burns played the remainder of the season with the Reds. Across 13 games (eight starts) for Cincinnati for the season, Burns had a 0-3 record, a 4.57 ERA, and 67 strikeouts across 43 1/3 innings pitched.

Burns was named to Cincinnati's Opening Day roster as a member of the club's starting rotation for the 2026 season. He earned his first major league win on March 30, 2026 against the Pittsburgh Pirates, pitching five scoreless innings and allowing one hit with three walks and seven strikeouts. On July 18, Burns signed a seven-year, $105 million contract extension with the Reds. He was selected for the 2026 Major League Baseball All-Star Game, alongside Sal Stewart. He did not make an appearance in the game due to a tight right groin.

== Personal life ==
Burns' favorite player and team as a child was Derek Jeter of the New York Yankees. His father played college football for the North Greenville Trailblazers.
