= Democrat, Kentucky =

Unincorporated community in Kentucky, United States

Coordinates: 37°14′00″N 82°48′12″W

Democrat is an unincorporated community in Letcher County, in the U.S. state of Kentucky.

== History ==
A post office called Democrat was established in 1892, and remained in operation until it was discontinued in 1985. The community was so named because the postmaster, Isom Sergent, was politically a Democrat.

== Notable person ==
Samuel C. Collins, physicist, was born at Democrat in 1898.
