= Sumner County Schools =

School district in Sumner County, Tennessee, United States

Address
- 695 East Main Street Gallatin, Tennessee, 37066; United States

District information
- Type: Public school district
- Grades: PK-12
- Superintendent: Scott Langford
- Schools: 49
- Budget: $258,399,000 (2017-18)
- NCES District ID: 4704020

Students and staff
- Enrollment: 29,636 (2017-18)
- Teachers: 1,927.30 (on an FTE basis)
- Student–teacher ratio: 15.38
- Athletic conference: TSSAA
- District mascot: Various
- Colors: Various

Other information
- Schedule: Various
- Website: www.sumnerschools.org

Sumner County Schools (SCS) is a public school district in Sumner County, Tennessee, United States. It enrolls approximately 29,000 students and is the eighth largest school district in Tennessee.

== Schools ==
=== Elementary (K–5) ===
- Jack Anderson Elementary School
- Beech Elementary School
- Benny Bills Elementary School
- Bethpage Elementary School
- Clyde Riggs Elementary School
- Dr. William Burrus Elementary School at Drakes Creek
- Gene Brown Elementary School
- George Whitten Elementary School
- Guild Elementary School
- H. B. Williams Elementary School
- Howard Elementary School
- Indian Lake Elementary School
- J. W. Wiseman Elementary School
- Lakeside Park Elementary School
- Liberty Creek Elementary School
- Madison Creek Elementary School
- Millersville Elementary School
- Nannie Berry Elementary School
- North Sumner Elementary School
- Oakmont Elementary School
- Portland Gateview Elementary School
- Station Camp Elementary School
- Union Elementary STEAM School (year-round school)
- Vena Stuart Elementary School
- Walton Ferry Elementary School
- Watt Hardison Elementary School
- Westmoreland Elementary School
- White House Intermediate School

=== Middle (6–8) ===
- Ellis Middle School
- Hawkins Middle School
- Joe Shafer Middle School
- Knox Doss at Drakes Creek Middle School
- Liberty Creek Middle School
- Portland East Middle School
- Portland West Middle School
- Rucker-Stewart Middle School
- Station Camp Middle School
- T. W. Hunter Middle School
- Westmoreland Middle School
- White House Middle School

=== High (9–12) ===
- Beech Senior High School
- Patricia Brown Virtual Academy
- Gallatin High School
- Hendersonville High School
- Liberty Creek High School
- Portland High School
- Station Camp High School
- Westmoreland High School
- White House High School

=== Magnet ===
- Merrol Hyde Magnet School (K–12)

=== Alternative ===
- R. T. Fisher Alternative School (K–12)
