= Merrol Hyde Magnet School =

Location
- 128 Township Drive; Hendersonville, Sumner County, Tennessee; United States; 36.3230°N 86.6235°W

Information
- Type: Magnet School
- Motto: Mandatus ad virtutem (English: Commandments for virtue)
- Established: 2003
- Principal: Darren Frank
- Teaching staff: 43.50 (FTE)
- Enrollment: 664 (2022–2023)
- Student to teacher ratio: 15.26
- Campus: Suburban
- Color
- Mascot: Hawks
- Website: Merrol Hyde Magnet School

Merrol Hyde Magnet School (MHMS) is a K–12 school in Hendersonville, Tennessee adhering to the Paideia philosophy and administered by the Sumner County Board of Education. It is the only magnet school in Sumner County. The school's motto is Mandatus ad virtutem (English: Commandments for virtue).

== History ==
MHMS was established in 2003. The school is named after Merrol N. Hyde, a local resident and Sumner County Commissioner. The school served grades 5–9 in its first school year. The second school year, 2004–05, the school had students in grades K–10 with the addition of a new elementary wing. The 2005–06 school year served grades K–11. The 2006–07 school year brought the first ever graduating class of MHMS. There were 57 college-bound graduates in the class of 2007.

On May 9, 2018, a chemical flash fire injured seventeen students and a teacher. The fire was caused by a reaction between Borax and ethanol. Eight students and the teacher were treated in local hospitals, but no critical injuries were reported. Two separate lawsuits were filed against the school district, citing negligence.

In April 2020, Merrol Hyde was ranked third in the nation on an academic basis by US News. This is its highest rank-based achievement to date. The ranking was awarded based on high college readiness, high math and reading proficiency, a consistent 100% graduation rate, and student performance on standardized tests, including AP, ACT, and SAT scores.

== Athletics ==
TSSAA sports include track, cross country, golf, tennis, soccer, football (varsity joins with Station Camp High School), basketball, swimming, volleyball, bowling. The school also offers archery, cheer-leading, dance team, cycling, and a personal fitness club. Other sports such as hockey allow students to join groups or teams in the area. Each student in grades 6-12 is required to participate in a sport each year.

== See also ==
- Sumner County Schools
- Exceptional education
- Magnet Schools of America
- Public education
- Selective school
