= Westmoreland High School =

Public high school in Westmoreland, Tennessee, United States

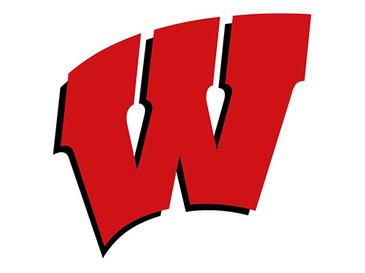

Location
- 4300 Hawkins Drive, Westmoreland, Tennessee, United States; 36.5695°N 86.2503°W

Information
- Type: Public
- Established: 1930s
- School district: Sumner County Schools
- Principal: Rick Duffer
- Faculty: 41.50 (FTE)
- Grades: 9–12
- Enrollment: 542 (2023–24)
- Student to teacher ratio: 13.06
- Colors: Red and white
- Athletics conference: Tennessee Secondary School Athletic Association (TSSAA)
- Mascot: Eagles
- Website: whs.sumnerschools.org

Westmoreland High School (WHS) is a public high school located in Westmoreland, Sumner County, Tennessee that enrolls approximately 500 students. It is one of eight high schools managed by Sumner County Schools.

== Demographics ==
The ethnic makeup of the school is approximately 95.1% Non-Hispanic White, 2.4% Hispanic or Latino, 1.6% Non-Hispanic Black or African American, 0.2% Asian, and 0.6% from two or more races. Gender distribution is exactly 50% male and 50% female.

== Athletics ==
The school's mascot is the Eagle, and their colors are red and white. The school competes in the Tennessee Secondary School Athletic Association (TSSAA) and offers the following sports:

- Baseball
- Boys' Basketball
- Girls' Basketball
- Boys' Cross Country
- Girls' Cross Country
- Boys' Golf
- Girls' Golf
- Boys' Track and Field
- Girls' Track and Field
- Cheerleading
- Football
- Softball - state championship, 1981
- Volleyball
- Soccer
