= Ray Oldham =

American football player (1951–2005)

- Oldham in 1977

No. 25, 23
- Position: Defensive back

Personal information
- Born: February 23, 1951; Gallatin, Tennessee, U.S.
- Died: July 23, 2005 (aged 54); Soddy-Daisy, Tennessee, U.S.
- Listed height: 6 ft 0 in (1.83 m)
- Listed weight: 200 lb (91 kg)

Career information
- High school: Gallatin (TN)
- College: Middle Tennessee State
- NFL draft: 1973: 8th round, 189th overall pick

Career history
- Baltimore Colts (1973–1978); Pittsburgh Steelers (1978); New York Giants (1979); Detroit Lions (1980–1982)

Awards and highlights
- Super Bowl champion (XIII)

Career NFL statistics
- Interceptions: 14
- Fumble recoveries: 6
- Defensive TDs: 2
- Stats at Pro Football Reference

Donnie Ray Oldham (February 23, 1951 – July 23, 2005) was an American professional football defensive back in the National Football League (NFL). He played for the Baltimore Colts, Pittsburgh Steelers, New York Giants, and Detroit Lions.

== Biography ==
Oldham was born in Gallatin, Tennessee, and graduated from Gallatin High School in Gallatin. He played college football at Middle Tennessee State University in Murfreesboro, Tennessee.

Oldham was selected by the Baltimore Colts in the eighth round (189th overall) of the 1973 NFL draft. He played for ten seasons in the NFL.

He earned a Super Bowl ring in 1978 when he was part of the Pittsburgh Steelers defense.

In 1983 Oldham was inducted into the Blue Raider Hall of Fame at Middle Tennessee State University.

He died on July 23, 2005, in Soddy-Daisy, Tennessee, after suffering a heart attack while on a bike ride.
