= Joejuan Williams =

American football player (born 1997)

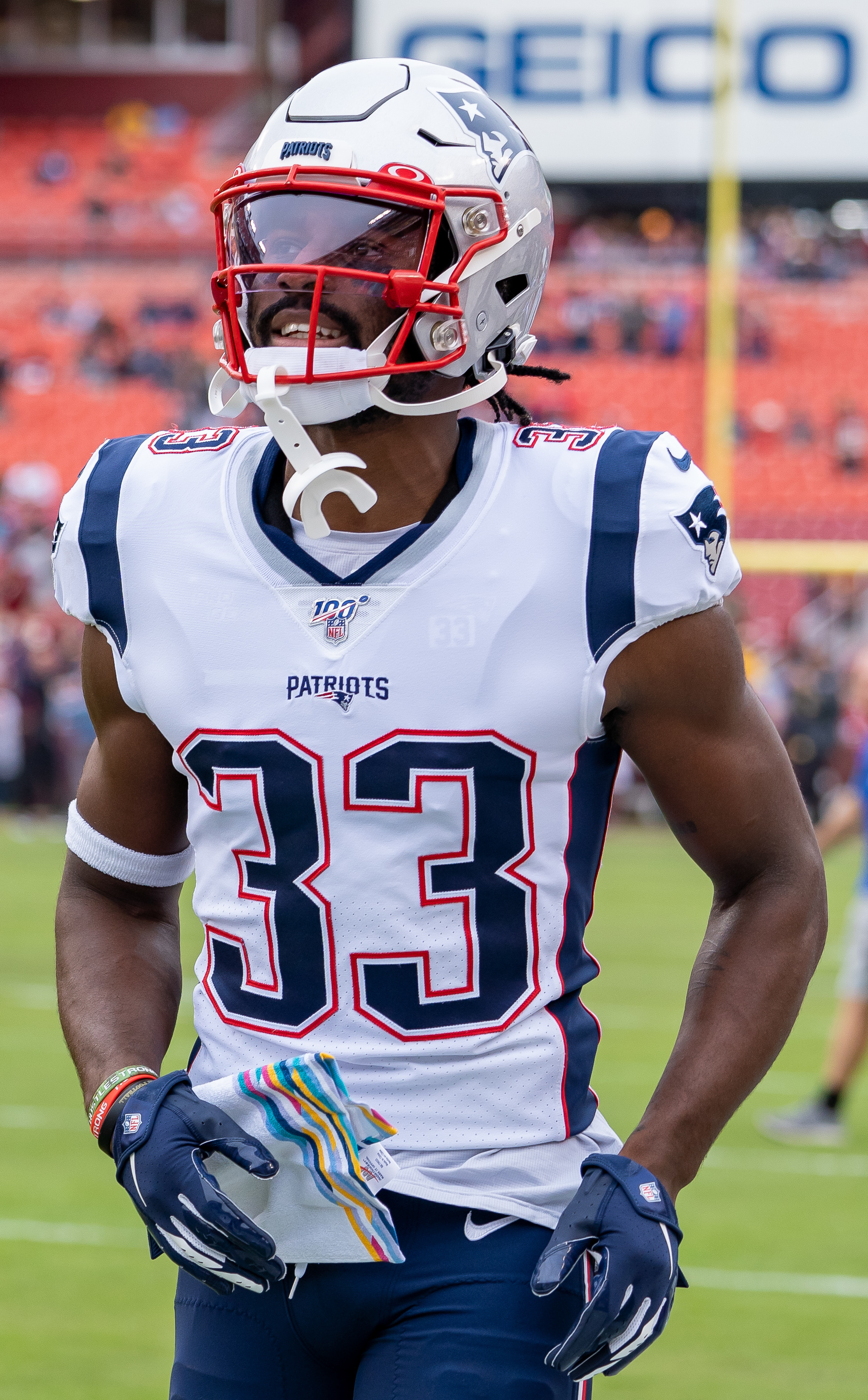
- Williams with the New England Patriots in 2019

No. 29, 30, 33
- Position: Cornerback

Personal information
- Born: December 6, 1997 (age 28); Nashville, Tennessee, U.S.
- Listed height: 6 ft 3 in (1.91 m)
- Listed weight: 212 lb (96 kg)

Career information
- High school: Hendersonville (Hendersonville, Tennessee)
- College: Vanderbilt (2016–2018)
- NFL draft: 2019: 2nd round, 45th overall pick

Career history
- New England Patriots (2019–2022); Minnesota Vikings (2023)*; Chicago Bears (2023); Minnesota Vikings (2023); New Orleans Saints (2024)*
- * Offseason or practice squad member only

Awards and highlights
- Second-team All-SEC (2018)

Career NFL statistics
- Total tackles: 46
- Pass deflections: 10
- Stats at Pro Football Reference

Joejuan Lamont Williams (/ˈdʒoʊdʒuːɔːn/ JOH-joo-awn; born December 6, 1997) is an American former professional football player who was a cornerback in the National Football League (NFL). He played college football for the Vanderbilt Commodores. He played in the National Football League (NFL) for the New England Patriots, Chicago Bears, and Minnesota Vikings.

== Early life ==
Williams attended Father Ryan High School in Nashville, Tennessee, for his first three years of high school before transferring to Hendersonville High School in Hendersonville, Tennessee for his senior year, but was ruled ineligible after his hardship request was denied. As a four-star prospect, Williams received offers from dozens of programs, including Alabama, Oklahoma, Penn State, Ohio State, and Georgia. He ultimately committed to Vanderbilt University to play college football.

== College career ==
Williams played at Vanderbilt from 2016 to 2018. After his junior season in 2018, he entered the 2019 NFL draft. During his career, he had 119 tackles and four interceptions.

=== College statistics ===
| | | | Tackles | | | | | Def Int | | | | | Fumbles | | | |
| Year | School | G | Solo | Ast | Tot | Loss | Sk | Int | Yds | Avg | TD | PD | FR | Yds | TD | FF |
|---|---|---|---|---|---|---|---|---|---|---|---|---|---|---|---|---|
| 2016 | Vanderbilt | 10 | 14 | 5 | 19 | 1.5 | 0.0 | 0 | 0 | 0 | 0 | 2 | 0 | 0 | 0 | 0 |
| 2017 | Vanderbilt | 11 | 33 | 6 | 39 | 2.5 | 0.0 | 0 | 0 | 0 | 0 | 10 | 0 | 0 | 0 | 1 |
| 2018 | Vanderbilt | 13 | 48 | 13 | 61 | 2.0 | 0.0 | 4 | 8 | 2.0 | 0 | 13 | 0 | 0 | 0 | 0 |
| Career | | 34 | 95 | 24 | 119 | 6.0 | 0.0 | 4 | 8 | 2.0 | 0 | 25 | 0 | 0 | 0 | 1 |

== Professional career ==
Pre-draft measurables
| Height | Weight | Arm length | Hand span | 40-yard dash | 10-yard split | 20-yard split | 20-yard shuttle | Three-cone drill | Vertical jump | Broad jump | Bench press |
|---|---|---|---|---|---|---|---|---|---|---|---|
| 6 ft 3 5/8 in (1.92 m) | 211 lb (96 kg) | 32 1/2 in (0.83 m) | 9 3/4 in (0.25 m) | 4.60 s | 1.64 s | 2.67 s | 4.07 s | 6.92 s | 36.0 in (0.91 m) | 10 ft 7 in (3.23 m) | 17 reps |
All values from NFL Combine/Pro Day

=== New England Patriots ===
Williams was selected by the New England Patriots in the second round (45th overall) of the 2019 NFL draft. He was the sixth cornerback selected. Williams made five appearances for the team as a rookie, recording one pass defense and five combined tackles.

Williams made 15 appearances for New England during the 2020 season, compiling two passes defended and 18 combined tackles. He played in 12 contests (including one start) for the team in 2021, recording five passes defended and 21 combined tackles.

Williams was placed on injured reserve on August 16, 2022, due to a shoulder injury that required season–ending surgery.

=== Minnesota Vikings ===
On April 17, 2023, Williams signed with the Minnesota Vikings. He was waived by Minnesota on August 29, and was re-signed to the team's practice squad the following day.

=== Chicago Bears ===
On September 27, 2023, Williams was signed by the Chicago Bears off the Vikings practice squad. He was released by Chicago on October 20 and was subsequently re-signed to the practice squad. On October 31, the Bears released Williams. In four appearances for the team, he accumulated one tackle.

=== Minnesota Vikings (second stint) ===
On November 1, 2023, Williams was signed to the Minnesota Vikings practice squad. He was elevated to the active roster on November 18. Williams made two appearances for Minnesota, recording two passes defended and one tackle. Following the end of the regular season, the Vikings signed Williams to a reserve/future contract on January 8, 2024. He was released by Minnesota on May 14.

=== New Orleans Saints ===
On August 20, 2024, Williams signed with the New Orleans Saints. He was released by New Orleans on August 27.

On May 16, 2026, Williams announced his retirement from professional football.
