= Liberty Creek High School =

Public secondary school in Gallatin, Tennessee, United States

Location
- 100 Wolfpack Way; Gallatin, Tennessee; United States; 36.3997°N 86.5650°W

Information
- Other names: LCHS
- Type: Public high school
- Established: 2022
- School district: Sumner County Schools
- Grades: 9–12
- Enrollment: 818 (2023–24)
- Colors: Navy, scarlet, Columbia blue, gray and white
- Mascot: Wolves
- Website: lch.sumnerschools.org

Liberty Creek High School is one of three public high schools in Gallatin, Tennessee.

== History ==
By 2018, Gallatin had five schools at or over capacity: Howard Elementary School, Station Camp Elementary School, Station Camp Middle School, Rucker Stewart Middle School, and Gallatin High School. In response, Sumner County Schools released plans for a new cluster of schools in October 2019, which included Liberty Creek High School, along with an elementary school and a middle school of the same name.

The school board unanimously approved a construction bid for the campus in November 2019. Phillip Holt was chosen to be Liberty Creek's first principal. The school opened on August 1, 2022, serving students from grades 6–12. Students in grades 6–8 moved to the Liberty Creek Middle School campus after construction was completed in 2024.
