= Samuel Collins (physicist) =

American physicist

Samuel Cornette Collins
- Born: September 28, 1898; Democrat, Kentucky, U.S.
- Died: June 19, 1984 (aged 85); George Washington University Hospital; Washington, D.C., U.S.
- Resting place: Lynnhurst Cemetery; 36.0247002°N 83.9321976°W
- Education: University of Tennessee; University of North Carolina
- Known for: Airborne Oxygen Generator; Collins Helium Cryostat; Helium Liquefiers; MIT Cryogenic Engineering Laboratory
- Spouse: Lena Arbragine Masterson
- Awards: Wethrill Medal of the Franklin Institute; Kamerlingh Onnes Gold Medal of Dutch Science; Rumford Medal of the American Academy of Arts and Sciences; Gold Medal of American Society of Mechanical Engineers
- Scientific career
- Fields: Air separation; Cryogenics; Helium Liquefiers
- Workplaces: Carson-Newman University; University of Tennessee; Tennessee State Teachers College; University of North Carolina; Massachusetts Institute of Technology

Samuel Cornette Collins (September 28, 1898 – June 19, 1984) was an American chemist, physicist, and engineer.

Collins graduated from Sumner County High School in 1916. He obtained his PhD in chemistry from the University of North Carolina in 1927. He taught at Carson-Newman College, the University of Tennessee, Tennessee State Teachers College, and the University of North Carolina, and joined the Massachusetts Institute of Technology as a research associate in the chemistry department in 1930. After World War II, he returned to MIT, joining the department of mechanical engineering. He was appointed professor in 1949 and retired in 1964. He was named professor emeritus, serving in this post until 1983.

Collins developed the first mass-produced helium liquefier, Collins Helium Cryostat, acquiring the title "Father of Practical Helium Liquefiers." Collin's refrigerators, powered by a two-piston expansion engine, provided the first reliable supplies of liquid helium in quantities of several hundred to several thousand liters.

Among other uses, these refrigerators were used to liquefy and transport helium and deuterium for the first hydrogen bomb explosion, Ivy Mike in 1952.

He was awarded the John Price Wetherill Medal in 1951 and the Rumford Prize in 1965.
