= John Jenkins (basketball) =

American basketball player (born 1991)

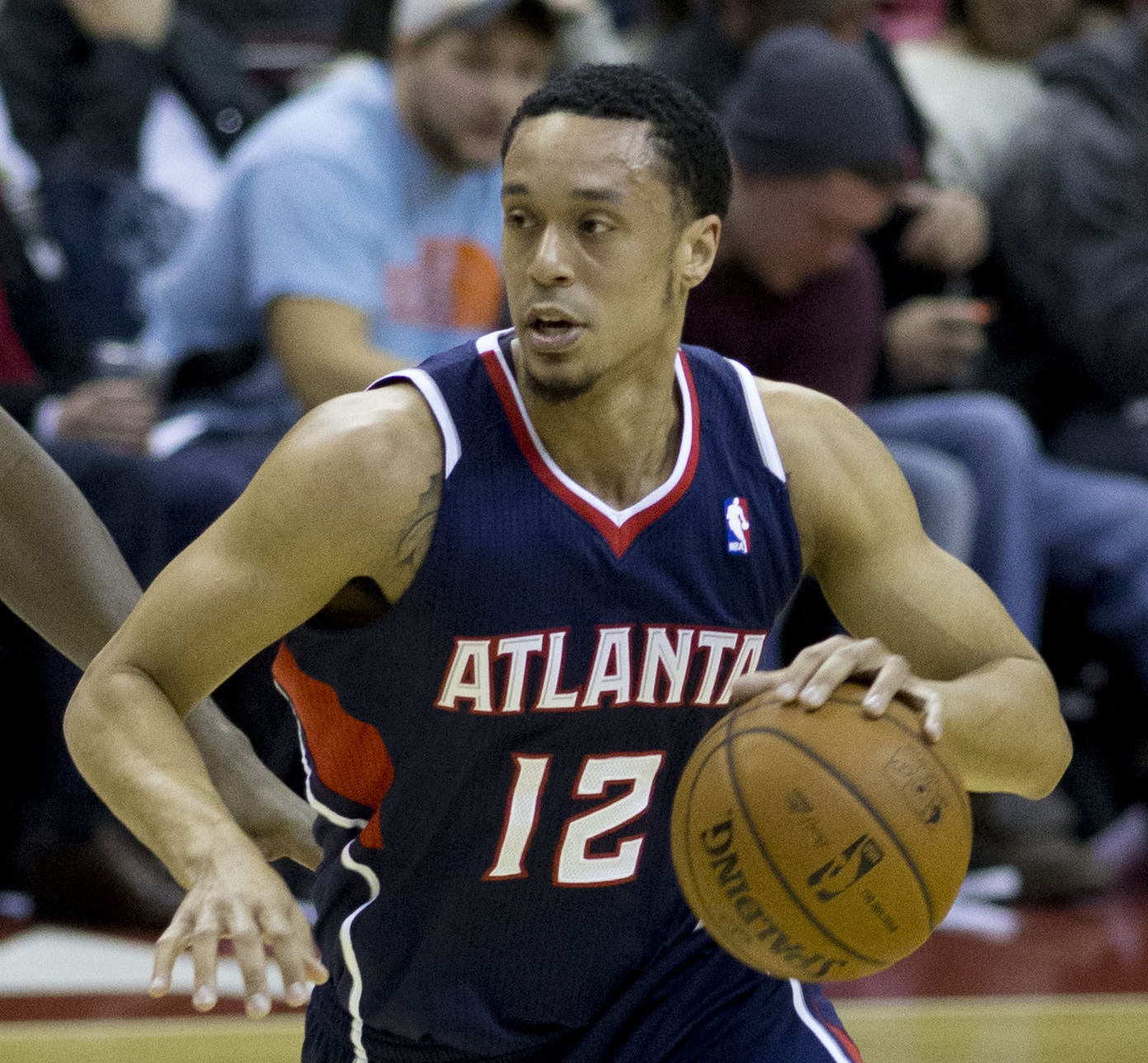
- Jenkins with the Atlanta Hawks in 2013

No. 12 – Adelaide 36ers
- Position: Shooting guard
- League: NBL

Personal information
- Born: March 6, 1991 (age 35) Hendersonville, Tennessee, U.S.
- Listed height: 6 ft 4 in (1.93 m)
- Listed weight: 215 lb (98 kg)

Career information
- High school: Station Camp (Gallatin, Tennessee)
- College: Vanderbilt (2009–2012)
- NBA draft: 2012: 1st round, 23rd overall pick
- Drafted by: Atlanta Hawks
- Playing career: 2012–present

Career history
- 2012–2015: Atlanta Hawks
- 2012–2013: →Bakersfield Jam
- 2014: →Fort Wayne Mad Ants
- 2014–2015: →Idaho Stampede
- 2015–2016: Dallas Mavericks
- 2016–2017: Phoenix Suns
- 2017: Westchester Knicks
- 2017–2018: Burgos
- 2018–2019: Westchester Knicks
- 2019: Washington Wizards
- 2019: →Capital City Go-Go
- 2019: New York Knicks
- 2020: Jiangsu Dragons
- 2020: Hapoel Eilat
- 2020–2021: Bilbao Basket
- 2021–2022: BCM Gravelines-Dunkerque
- 2022–2023: NBA G League Ignite
- 2023: Bàsquet Girona
- 2023–2024: NBA G League Ignite
- 2024: Criollos de Caguas
- 2025: Lokomotiv Kuban
- 2025: Cangrejeros de Santurce
- 2025–2026: CS Vâlcea 1924
- 2026–present: Adelaide 36ers
- 2026: Santeros de Aguada

Career highlights
- Third-team All-American – AP, SN (2012); First-team All-SEC (2012); SEC All-Rookie team (2010); Third-team Parade All-American (2009); 2× Tennessee Mr. Basketball (2008, 2009)
- Stats at NBA.com
- Stats at Basketball Reference

John Logan Jenkins III (born March 6, 1991) is an American professional basketball player for the Adelaide 36ers of the Australian National Basketball League (NBL). He played college basketball for the Vanderbilt Commodores before being selected by the Atlanta Hawks with the 23rd pick in the 2012 NBA draft. He played in the NBA for the Hawks, Dallas Mavericks, Phoenix Suns, Washington Wizards and New York Knicks from 2012 to 2019. Jenkins has also played professionally in Spain, China, Israel, France, Puerto Rico, Russia and Romania.

== Early life ==
As a senior at Station Camp High School, Jenkins was the nation's leading scorer for high schoolers, averaging 42.3 points per game, finishing second on the state's single-season list behind Ronnie Schmitz, who averaged 44.2 points at Ridgeway High School in 1988–89.

Considered a five-star recruit by Rivals.com, Jenkins was listed as the No. 6 shooting guard and the No. 15 player in the nation in 2008. Jenkins was a two-time TSSAA Class AA Mr. Basketball selection, and was the Gatorade Tennessee High School Player of the Year in 2008–09.

== College career ==
One of the nation's top shooters, Jenkins shot 48.3% (72–149) from three in his freshman season at Vanderbilt, 40.8% (100–245) as a sophomore, and 43.9% (134–305) from beyond-the-arc as a junior. As a sophomore, he led the Southeastern Conference in scoring (19.5) and in 3-point field goals made per game (3.1) and finished second in free throw percentage (.894) and was picked to the Fifth Team All-America by Fox Sports. As a junior, he averaged 19.9 points per game, leading the SEC for the second consecutive season (the first time since LSU's Ronnie Henderson did it in 1995–96). He also tied an SEC single-season record for threes made in a season with 134. He led the nation in three-pointers made per game (3.9) and was named a third-team All-American by the Associated Press.

On April 9, 2012, Jenkins announced that he would forgo his final year of eligibility at Vanderbilt to enter the 2012 NBA draft.

== Professional career ==
=== Atlanta Hawks (2012–2015) ===
Jenkins was selected by the Atlanta Hawks with the 23rd overall pick in the 2012 NBA draft. On July 10, 2012, he signed his rookie scale contract with the Hawks and joined them for the 2012 NBA Summer League. On December 1, 2012, he was assigned to the Bakersfield Jam of the NBA Development League. On December 5, 2012, he was recalled by the Hawks.

In July 2013, Jenkins re-joined the Hawks for the 2013 NBA Summer League. On October 31, 2013, the Hawks exercised their third-year team option on Jenkins' rookie scale contract, extending the contract through the 2014–15 season. On December 6, 2013, he was reassigned to the Bakersfield Jam. On December 13, he was recalled by the Hawks. Shortly after being recalled, Jenkins was deactivated due to lower back pain. On February 3, 2014, the Hawks announced Jenkins underwent successful surgery on his back and subsequently missed the rest of the 2013–14 season.

In July 2014, Jenkins re-joined the Hawks for the 2014 NBA Summer League. On October 30, 2014, the Hawks declined to exercise Jenkins' four-year team option and thus allowing him to become an unrestricted free agent in 2015. On November 28, 2014, he was assigned to the Fort Wayne Mad Ants. On December 30, 2014, using the flexible assignment rule, the Hawks assigned Jenkins to the Idaho Stampede, the affiliate of the Utah Jazz. On January 20, 2015, he was recalled by the Hawks.

=== Dallas Mavericks (2015–2016) ===
On July 24, 2015, Jenkins signed with the Dallas Mavericks. On October 29, in just his second game for the Mavericks, Jenkins recorded 17 points, 6 rebounds and 3 assists as a starter in a loss to the Los Angeles Clippers. On February 22, 2016, he was waived by the Mavericks.

=== Phoenix Suns (2016–2017) ===
On February 24, 2016, Jenkins was claimed off waivers by the Phoenix Suns. The Suns inherited Jenkins' three-year contract with non-guaranteed years of $1.05 million for 2016–17 and $1.18 million for 2017–18. He made his debut for the Suns the following day, scoring two points in four minutes off the bench against the Brooklyn Nets. During his first season with the Suns, he averaged 5.0 points and a career-high 1.2 assists per game.

On October 24, 2016, Jenkins was retained by the Suns for the 2016–17 season. On January 6, 2017, he was waived by the Suns after making four appearances in the 2016–17 season.

=== Westchester Knicks (2017) ===
On February 3, 2017, Jenkins was acquired by the Westchester Knicks of the NBA Development League.

On September 25, 2017, Jenkins signed with the Atlanta Hawks, returning to the franchise for a second stint. He was waived before the regular season by the Hawks on October 6, 2017.

=== San Pablo Burgos (2017–2018) ===
On November 7, 2017, Jenkins signed with Spanish club San Pablo Burgos for his first professional experience in Europe.

=== Westchester Knicks (2018–2019) ===
On October 3, 2018, Jenkins signed with the New York Knicks. He was waived the following day and subsequently joined the Westchester Knicks for the 2018–19 NBA G League season.

=== Washington Wizards (2019) ===
On January 30, 2019, Jenkins signed a 10-day contract with the Washington Wizards. During the ten days, he was assigned three times to the Capital City Go-Go.

=== New York Knicks (2019) ===
On February 11, 2019, Jenkins signed a 10-day contract with the New York Knicks. He signed a rest-of-season contract on February 21.

=== Jiangsu Dragons (2020) ===
In January 2020, Jenkins joined the Jiangsu Dragons of the Chinese Basketball Association..

=== Hapoel Eilat (2020) ===
On February 26, 2020, Jenkins signed with Hapoel Eilat of the Israeli Premier League.

=== Bilbao Basket (2020–2021) ===
On December 15, 2020, Jenkins signed a two-month contract with RETAbet Bilbao Basket of the Liga ACB. He averaged 12.6 points, 1.7 rebounds, and 1.2 assists per game.

=== BCM Gravelines-Dunkerque (2021–2022) ===
In August 2021, Jenkins signed with BCM Gravelines-Dunkerque of the LNB Pro A.

=== NBA G League Ignite (2022–2023) ===
In September 2022, Jenkins joined the NBA G League Ignite for the 2022–23 NBA G League season.

=== Bàsquet Girona (2023) ===
On March 30, 2023, Jenkins signed with Bàsquet Girona of the Liga ACB.

=== Return to the NBA G League Ignite (2023–2024) ===
Jenkins re-joined the NBA G League Ignite for the 2023–24 NBA G League season.

=== Criollos de Caguas (2024) ===
On May 26, 2024, Jenkins signed with Criollos de Caguas of the Baloncesto Superior Nacional.

=== Lokomotiv Kuban (2025) ===
In March 2025, Jenkins joined Lokomotiv Kuban of the VTB United League for the rest of the 2024–25 season.

=== Cangrejeros de Santurce (2025) ===
Jenkins joined Cangrejeros de Santurce for the 2025 Baloncesto Superior Nacional season.

=== CS Vâlcea 1924 Râmnicu Vâlcea (2025–2026) ===
In December 2025, Jenkins joined CS Vâlcea 1924 Râmnicu Vâlcea of the Romanian Liga Națională. He played five games for Vâlcea between December 13 and January 10.

=== Adelaide 36ers and Santeros de Aguada (2026–present) ===
On January 14, 2026, Jenkins signed with the Adelaide 36ers of the Australian National Basketball League (NBL) for the rest of the 2025–26 season.

In May 2026, Jenkins joined Santeros de Aguada for the rest of the 2026 BSN season.

On June 22, 2026, Jenkins re-signed with the 36ers for the 2026–27 NBL season.

== Career statistics ==
=== NBA ===
Legend
GP	Games played	GS	Games started	MPG	Minutes per game
FG%	Field goal percentage	3P%	3-point field goal percentage	FT%	Free throw percentage
RPG	Rebounds per game	APG	Assists per game	SPG	Steals per game
BPG	Blocks per game	PPG	Points per game	**Bold**	Career high

==== Regular season ====
Year	Team	GP	GS	MPG	FG%	3P%	FT%	RPG	APG	SPG	BPG	PPG
2012–13	Atlanta	**61**	2	**14.8**	.446	.384	.843	1.5	.9	.2	**.2**	**6.1**
2013–14	Atlanta	13	0	12.2	.381	.222	**1.000**	**1.7**	.8	.1	.1	3.1
2014–15	Atlanta	24	**3**	12.4	.495	.404	.842	1.6	.5	**.4**	.0	5.6
2015–16	Dallas	21	1	9.2	.414	.158	.889	1.0	.4	.1	.0	3.3
2015–16	Phoenix	22	2	13.0	.467	.406	.800	1.6	**1.2**	.2	.0	5.0
2016–17	Phoenix	4	0	3.3	.400	.500	**1.000**	.3	.3	.0	.0	1.8
2018–19	Washington	4	0	3.5	**1.000**	**1.000**	–	.3	.3	.0	.0	1.5
2018–19	New York	22	0	14.5	.388	.357	.833	1.6	1.0	.0	.1	5.2
Career		171	8	12.8	.441	.367	.847	1.5	.8	.2	.1	5.0

==== Playoffs ====
Year	Team	GP	GS	MPG	FG%	3P%	FT%	RPG	APG	SPG	BPG	PPG
2013	Atlanta	**4**	0	**6.0**	.000	.000	.000	.5	**.8**	.0	.0	.0
2015	Atlanta	**4**	0	5.3	**.667**	**.500**	.000	**.8**	.0	.0	.0	**2.5**
Career		8	0	5.6	.444	.400	.000	.6	.8	.0	.0	1.3

=== College ===
Year	Team	GP	GS	MPG	FG%	3P%	FT%	RPG	APG	SPG	BPG	PPG
2009–10	Vanderbilt	31	7	23.1	.470	**.483**	.800	2.2	1.0	.5	.2	11.0
2010–11	Vanderbilt	32	32	**34.5**	.462	.408	**.894**	**3.0**	1.2	.8	.3	19.5
2011–12	Vanderbilt	**35**	**35**	33.6	**.474**	.439	.837	2.9	1.2	.8	.3	**19.9**
Career		98	74	30.6	.468	.438	.856	2.7	1.1	.7	.3	16.9

== Awards and honors ==
- 2× Tennessee Mr. Basketball (2008, 2009)
- Third-team Parade All-American (2009)
- Reebok All-American (2009)
- Named to the SEC All-Freshman team and Sixth Man of the Year by the league's coaches in 2009–10
- First-team All-SEC selection by the league's coaches and media in 2010–11 and in 2011–12
- Associated Press third-team All-American in 2011–12

== Personal life ==
He is the son of John Jenkins Jr. and Melodye Jenkins and has a sister, Adrianne. He majored in Interdisciplinary Studies with a focus in Religious Studies. Jenkins and his wife have a daughter.

== See also ==
- List of NCAA Division I men's basketball season 3-point field goal leaders
