= Station Camp High School =

Public school in Gallatin, Tennessee, United States

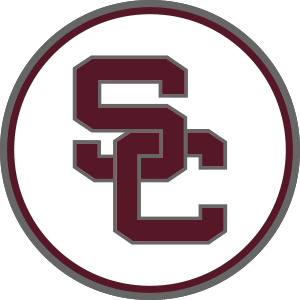

Location
- 1040 Bison Tr; Gallatin, Tennessee 37066; United States; 36.36295°N 86.54764°W

Information
- Type: Public School
- Motto: "Home of the Bison"
- Established: 2002
- School district: Sumner County Schools
- Head teacher: Josh Ray, Principal
- Enrollment: 1,137 (2024–2025)
- Campus: Suburban
- Color
- Mascot: American bison
- Website: sch.sumnerschools.org

Station Camp High School (SCHS), located at 1040 Bison Trail, Gallatin, Tennessee, United States, is a public high school that opened in 2002. It is part of Sumner County Schools, with Josh Ray serving as the current principal.

== History ==
Station Camp High School was created to ease overpopulation in three Sumner County public schools: Gallatin High School, Hendersonville High School, and Beech High School. It is a four-year high school but, during the first years of operation, juniors and seniors could stay at their schools of origin. Freshmen and sophomores could attend the school an older brother or sister was currently attending. The same situation occurred before the 2016–17 school year.

David Hallman, the first principal, hired staff at a temporary building on the school property while overseeing construction of the plant and facilities. Guidance and administration registered students at the same building. Eventually, the office was moved to the Board of Education building where rooms were prepared for the opening of the 2002–03 school year.

The facility located on Lower Station Camp Creek Road was not completed, so students and staff had to meet at 695 East Main Street in Gallatin. The temporary facility was the former Gallatin Junior High that was being renovated to house the administrative offices of the Sumner County Board of Education. For two months, classes met in former classrooms, portables, and temporary classrooms in the Teacher Center. During those two months, the population exceeded predictions causing some classes to be moved and additional teachers to be hired.

By 2017, Station Camp had become overcrowded. Over 1,800 attended the school, and rezoning sent students back to Beech High School and Gallatin High School. In response, Sumner County Schools announced plans for Liberty Creek High School in 2019.

== 2006 Tornado ==
SCHS was in the middle of the hardest hit areas during the April 7 tornadoes. The inside of the building itself was relatively unscathed. Outside, only two light poles were blown down on the left side of the building, but damage was sustained to the roof of the gymnasium. Several of the athletic fields were damaged. The baseball and softball fields were destroyed, along with the field house. Additionally, several of the football field lights were toppled, and the school had to provide extra lighting for the 2006 football season. An entire row of trees along Lower Station Camp Creek Road was torn apart, changing the view south of the school.

== 2010 Flood ==
During the Nashville flood in May 2010, the school's grounds were damaged when Station Camp Creek overflowed its banks. The majority of damage was done to the football practice field and the baseball fields.

== Athletics ==
Station Camp competes in the Tennessee Secondary School Athletic Association.

=== Men's ===
- JROTC Raiders
- Cross-Country
  As of the 2008–09 season, the boys' and girls' cross-country teams have made it to the state competition all seven years that the school had been open. Holding multiple region team championships and one team summer county championship (men's). And in the 2008–2009 season, the bison went on to achieve a runner-up (2nd place) victory at the state meet, narrowly losing to Martin Luther King school, by twelve points.
- Baseball
- Basketball
  In 2009, SCHS graduated an award-winning player in John Jenkins, the Tennessee Mr. Basketball winner in both his junior and senior years. He was also a member of multiple High School All-America teams and was named Gatorade Player of the Year for 2008–09. In the 2009 season (his final at SCHS) he led all high school divisions in the nation in scoring. Jenkins, a highly recruited high school player, attended Vanderbilt University for 3 years. Following his junior season, Jenkins entered the NBA draft, where he was selected by the Atlanta Hawks.
- Bowling
- Football
  On November 2, 2007, the Station Camp High School football team won their first region championship with a regular season record of 9–1. The Bison hosted Meigs County in the first round of the TSSAA Playoffs on November 9, 2007.
  Josh Malone was a standout football player for Station Camp before going on to play at the University of Tennessee and then in the NFL for the Cincinnati Bengals, New York Jets, and currently with the Tennessee Titans.
- Golf
- Ice Hockey
- Soccer
  With district and regions titles in 2015, 2016, and 2017, the SC Bison Soccer team has made two state appearances. The most recent winning the 9-AAA soccer state championship in 2017.
- Swimming
- Tennis
- Track and Field
- Wrestling

=== Women's ===
- JROTC Raiders
- Basketball
- Bowling
- Cheerleading
- Cross-Country
- Dance

-In 2017–2018, the SCHS Bison Belles won their first ever TSSAA State Title winning the Small Varsity Hip Hop Division

-In 2018–2019, the Belles defended their state title winning the Small Varsity Hip Hop Division. The team also took the title for Small Varsity Kick. The team competed and advanced to finals in Jazz and Hip Hop at the Nationals Dance Team Competition in Orlando. The Team also won 6th place In their first ever Game Day competition.

-In the 2019–2020 Dance Year, the Belles made school and Team history by bringing home their first ever National Championship in Small Varsity Game Day Division. They brought home a 6th place finish in the Small Varsity Hip Hop Category. The team also defended their State Titles in both Hip Hop and Kick.

- Golf
  In 2018–19, the women's golf team won a state championship, the first girls' team championship in the school's history.
- Soccer
- Softball
- Tennis
- Track and Field
- Volleyball
- Swimming

=== State championships ===
- The men's soccer team won back-to-back state championships in 2017–18 and 2018–19.

== Notable alumni ==
- Chase Burns, baseball player
- Riley Gaines, political activist, competitive swimmer
- John Jenkins, basketball player
- Josh Malone, American football player
