= Portland High School (Tennessee) =

Public high school in Portland, Tennessee

Location
- Portland, Tennessee; United States; 36.58248°N 86.53278°W

Information
- Former name: Sumner County High School (1915–1962)
- School board: Sumner County Schools
- Staff: 69.50 (FTE)
- Grades: 9–12
- Enrollment: 1,179 (2023–24)
- Student to teacher ratio: 17.25
- Colors: Purple and white
- Mascot: Panthers
- Website: phs.sumnerschools.org

Portland High School is a public secondary school located in Portland, Tennessee, United States. It is operated by Sumner County Schools and serves students in grades 9 through 12.

== History ==
The school began in 1874 as Portland Seminary and sat on a 1-acre (4,000 m^{2}) plot of land donated by the son of the town's founder. The building had two stories, the second being used by The National Grange of the Order of Patrons of Husbandry. The first story was also used for church services. In 1897 the principal of the school, Z.K. Griffin, was conducting a lab experiment when a fire broke out destroying the building. A replacement structure was completed in 1898.

By 1910, the institution operated as Portland High School, offering three years of secondary instruction. In 1915, it was reorganized as Sumner County High School, becoming the first four-year public high school in Sumner County, Tennessee. During the early 1940s, the school received accreditation from the Southern Association of Colleges and Schools.

== Campus ==
The current campus, established in the early 1960s, includes classroom buildings, athletic facilities, and a gymnasium. The campus has undergone multiple expansions and renovations to accommodate enrollment growth and modern instructional needs.

== Extracurricular activities ==
Students may participate in a variety of extracurricular programs, including athletics, music, and student organizations. Athletic teams, known as the Panthers, compete in sports sanctioned by the Tennessee Secondary School Athletic Association (TSSAA).

== Notable alumni ==
- Corey Brewer, former National Basketball Association player
- Samuel Collins, chemist and developer of the first mass-produced helium liquefier
- William Lamberth, Majority Leader of the Tennessee House of Representatives
- Ronnie McDowell, country music artist and entertainer
- James F. Neal, attorney and prosecutor during the Watergate scandal

== Former principals ==
The following individuals have served as principal or head administrator of Portland High School and its predecessor institutions:

- Z. K. Griffin (–1897) – Principal of Portland Seminary; oversaw early academic instruction until the original building was destroyed by fire.
- Pat W. Kerr (1910–1913) – Led the school during its operation as a three-year high school.
- P. L. Lloyd (1913–1914)
- John W. Williams (1914–1927) – Supervised the transition toward a four-year secondary institution.
- B. F. Smith (1927–1931)
- C. F. Allen (1931–1935)
- Harry Law (1935–1937)
- Lee Harris (1937–1939)
- C. L. Cummings (1939–1942)
- C. O. Jett (1943–1945)
- E. V. Walling (1945–1947)
- William Hunter
- Clarence Terry
- William Coker (1960–1974)
- John Meece (Interim, 1974; Principal 1984–1994)
- Jim Stephens (1974–1978)
- Harvey Foster (1978–1984)
- Calvin Short (1994–1998) – Oversaw planning and construction of the current campus on College Street.
- Janet Grogan (1998–2007)
- Robert Gideon (2007– )
