= White House High School =

Public high school in White House, Tennessee, United States

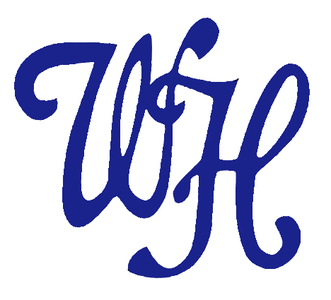

Location
- 508 Tyree Springs Road, White House, Tennessee, United States; 36.4592°N 86.6449°W

Information
- Type: Public
- School district: Sumner County Schools
- Principal: Kyle Gilliland
- Faculty: 58.00 (FTE)
- Grades: 9-12
- Enrollment: 804 (2023–24)
- Student to teacher ratio: 14.21
- Colors: Royal blue and white
- Athletics conference: Tennessee Secondary School Athletic Association (TSSAA)
- Mascot: Blue Devils
- Website: whh.sumnerschools.org

White House High School (WHHS) is a public high school in White House, Sumner County, Tennessee. It is one of nine high schools managed by Sumner County Schools, and enrolls approximately 824 students.

== Demographics ==
The ethnic makeup of the school is approximately 89.3% Non-Hispanic White, 4.6% Hispanic or Latino, 3.2% Non-Hispanic Black or African American, 1.7% Asian, 0.5% Native American, and 0.7% from two or more races. Approximately 50.2% of students are male and 49.8% are female.

== Athletics ==
The White House High School's mascot is the Blue Devil, and its colors are royal blue and white. The school competes in the Tennessee Secondary School Athletic Association (TSSAA), and offers the following sports:

- Baseball
- Boys' Basketball
- Girls' Basketball
- Boys' Bowling
- Girls' Bowling
- Boys' Cross Country
- Girls' Cross Country
- Boys' Golf
- Girls' Golf
- Boys' Tennis
- Girls' Tennis
- Boys' Track and Field
- Girls' Track and Field
- Boys' Soccer
- Girls Soccer
- Cheerleading
- Softball
- Volleyball
- Wrestling
- Football

=== State championships ===
- Baseball - 2000
- Football - 1997
- Girls' soccer - 2017
- Girls' track and field - 2017
- Wrestling - 2019
