= Beech Senior High School =

Beech High School

Location
- 3126 Long Hollow Pk; Hendersonville, Tennessee 37075; United States; 36.37212°N 86.62078°W

Information
- Type: Public school
- Established: 1980
- School district: Sumner County Schools
- Principal: Kenneth Powell
- Teaching staff: 90.48 (FTE)
- Enrollment: 1,464 (2023–2024)
- Student to teacher ratio: 16.18
- Campus: Suburban / Rural
- Colors: Navy and orange
- Mascot: Buccaneer
- Website: https://bhs.sumnerschools.org/

Beech High School is one of two public high schools near Hendersonville, Tennessee. The school is located in the Shackle Island community on Long Hollow Pike, near the intersection of Shackle Island Road, Long Hollow Pike, and New Hope Road, just to the north of the Hendersonville city limits, and is part of the Sumner County Schools district. The current school officially opened on August 27, 1980, under the direction of Mr. Merroll N. Hyde. In 1986, the first female principal in Sumner County, Mary Clouse, became the principal. Frank Cardwell served as principal from 1999 until 2014, and was succeeded by Kenneth Powell.

The school's mascot is the Buccaneer, which is frequently shortened to "Buc." The school colors are officially navy blue and orange.

A significant change occurred in the 2005–2006 school year when T.W. Hunter Middle School's new campus was completed. Beech relocated many of its ninth grade classes to the old T.W. Hunter building, now the high school's annex.

Beech softball holds four state titles, and the football team was the 2009 and 2012 Class 5A State Champion.

== Football ==
Beech was the 2009 and 2012 Class 5A State Football Champion, winning the 2012 championship after going undefeated.

== Academics ==
Classes at Beech follow either the standard, honors, or advanced placement level, excluding those in the fine arts and some other courses. The school has ACT test scores that are at or above state and national averages.

== Notable alumni ==
- Jalen Hurd (2014), NFL wide receiver
- Sam McWilliams (2014), MiLB pitcher
- Chase Burns (2021), MLB pitcher
- Luke Sinnard (2021), MiLB pitcher

== Sources ==
- Official website
- https://web.archive.org/web/20110727221358/http://tssaa.org/schdir/Schdir_Detail.cfm?ID=19
- School board
- http://www.greatschools.net/modperl/achievement/tn/1446#from..Tab
- Football information
