= Gallatin High School (Tennessee) =

Public school in Gallatin, Tennessee

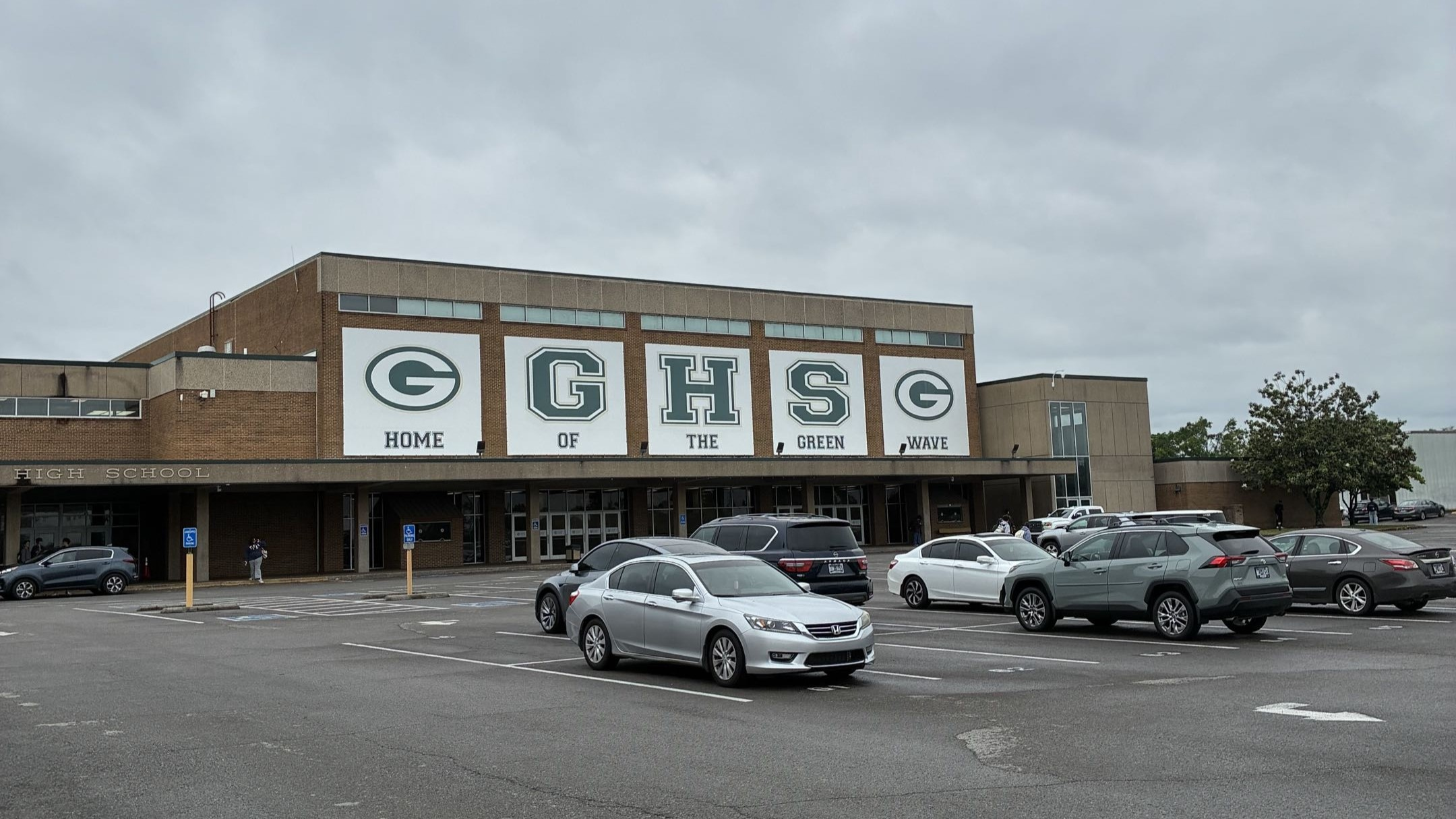

Location
- 700 Dan P. Herron Dr; Gallatin, Tennessee 37066; United States; 36.3786°N 86.4611°W

Information
- Type: Public School
- Motto: Green Wave Pride
- Established: 1914
- School district: Sumner County Schools
- Head teacher: Ron Becker, Principal
- Teaching staff: 110.47 (FTE)
- Enrollment: 1,677 (2023–2024)
- Student to teacher ratio: 15.18
- Color
- Mascot: Green Wave
- Website: ghs.sumnerschools.org

Gallatin High School (GHS) is one of three public high schools in Gallatin, Tennessee. The school is located at 700 Dan P. Herron Drive in Gallatin and the current principal is Ron Becker. It is part of Sumner County Schools.

== History ==
Gallatin High School first opened as Trousdale-Allen school on September 7, 1914. The school changed its name to Central High School in 1915. In 1932, a new building was opened as Gallatin High School and used until the current building opened in 1974.

Gallatin High School has a storied rivalry with Hendersonville High School. It has lasted since Hendersonville was opened.

The zebra swallowtail butterfly was chosen as the state butterfly of Tennessee by students in Sherrill Charlton's biology class at the school and was made official in 1994.

On January 8, 2016, the school's gym was dedicated as Jerry Vradenburg Gymnasium. Vradenburg served as a teacher, a coach of multiple sports, and as the school's long-time athletics director from 1966 to 1993. He was coach of the school's 1973 boys' basketball state championship team. Vradenburg also coached the 1970 team vs. Union High School in a game that is the subject of the book "More Than Rivals".

In October 2016, Gallatin High School announced the inaugural class of the Gallatin Athletics Hall of Fame. The Hall was created to recognize outstanding athletes, coaches, and contributors to the athletics programs of both Gallatin and Union High Schools.

Two new events were celebrated during the 2017–18 school year:

On August 25, 2017, the football programs for Gallatin and Station Camp played in the inaugural Mayor's Cup of Gallatin. The winning team each year will be presented the Mayor's Cup by the Mayor of Gallatin.

On February 6, 2018, the basketball teams for Gallatin wore uniforms celebrating and honoring Union High School.

On October 18, 2024, the Gallatin football team wore uniforms to honor the legacy of Union High School.

As of January 2026, two GHS alumni serve in the Tennessee State Senate.

== Notable alumni ==
- Johnny Maddox, ragtime pianist, historian, and collector of music memorabilia with a star on Hollywood Walk of Fame
- Brent Alexander, former NFL player; Cardinals, Panthers, Steelers, Giants
- Kimberley Locke, singer; American Idol contestant, season 2 - third place finalist
- Joe Haynes, former Tennessee State Senator, District 20; served 94th through 107th Tennessee General Assembly
- Larry Joe Inman, former American women's basketball coach at multiple Division I universities
- Kenneth Nixon, lead singer & songwriter; Framing Hanley
- Ray Oldham, former NFL player; Colts, Steelers, Giants, Lions
- Chuck Wagner, actor
- Ferrell Haile, Tennessee State Senator, District 18; elected 2012
- Ben Briley, American Idol season thirteen eleventh place finalist.
- Brenda Gilmore, retired Tennessee State Senator
- Jordan Mason, NFL running back; San Francisco 49ers
- Chase Matthew, country music singer
